= JMR =

JMR may refer to:

- Japan Media Review, an English academic online journal dedicated to the Japanese press
- Jean Marie River, in Northwest Territories, Canada
- Jelle's Marble Runs, a YouTube channel
- Jerónimo Martins, Portuguese corporate group in food distribution and retail
- Job Masego Regiment, an infantry regiment of the South African Army
- John McIntyre Racing, a New Zealand motor racing team
- John Morris Russell, American orchestral conductor
- Jahkeele Marshall-Rutty, Canadian soccer player
- Journal of Magnetic Resonance
- Journal of Marketing Research
- Journal of Musculoskeletal Research
- Joint Multi-role Helicopter, precursor of Future Vertical Lift
- Junk Mail Reporting, Microsoft's name for Feedback loop
