= TCJ =

TCJ may refer to:

- Eiken (studio)
- Initialism of Tan Chuan-Jin
- The Comics Journal
- TCJ subsection at Cell junction
