= Hisamatsu =

Hisamatsu (written: 久松) is a Japanese surname. Notable people with the surname include:

- Fumio Hisamatsu (久松 文雄, born 1943), Japanese manga artist and character designer
- Hisamatsu Sadakatsu (久松 定勝, 1560–1624), Japanese daimyō
- Ikumi Hisamatsu (久松 郁実, born 1996), Japanese fashion model, gravure idol, television personality and actress
- Seiji Hisamatsu (久松 静児, 1912–1990), Japanese film director
- Shiho Hisamatsu (久松 志保, born 1979), Japanese tennis player
- Shin'ichi Hisamatsu (久松 真一, 1889–1980), Japanese Zen Buddhist scholar, philosopher and tea master
