= Izumi Takemoto =

Japanese manga artist and illustrator

Izumi Takemoto 竹本 泉
- Born: 竹本 謙 (Takemoto Ken); January 19, 1959 (age 67) Saitama Prefecture, Japan
- Area: Manga artist
- Notable works: Aoi-chan Panic!; Anmitsu-hime

Izumi Takemoto (竹本 泉, Takemoto Izumi; born January 19, 1959, in Saitama Prefecture, Japan) is a Japanese manga artist and illustrator. He attended College of Economics at Nihon University. His spouse is manga artist Reiko Yano.

He cites artists such as Shinji Wada, Fumio Hisamatsu, Shotaro Ishinomori, and Mitsuteru Yokoyama as his influences.

== Biography ==
Ken Takemoto (竹本 謙, Takemoto Ken) was born January 19, 1959, in Saitama Prefecture, Japan. He attended and graduated from Nihon University in the College of Economics.

His professional manga debut, Yumemiru July Cat (夢みる7月猫, Yumemiru Juraikyatto) (using the pen name Izumi Takemoto), appeared in the August 1981 issue of Nakayoshi, though it wasn't published in book form until 2003. All of his professional manga and illustration work has appeared using the name "Izumi Takemoto". In an interview with BookScan, Takemoto cited artists such as Shinji Wada, Fumio Hisamatsu, Shotaro Ishinomori, and Mitsuteru Yokoyama as his influences. His first experience with science fiction was through the works of Edgar Rice Burroughs, and the majority of his works reflect this SF influence. He is also a cat lover, and while cats frequently appear in his works, he had never owned a cat until 2003. He used his first experiences with his cat when he wrote Aru Hi no Zwei.

Takemoto's works have been nominated seven times for the Seiun Award in the Best Comic category but never won the award. His third published manga, Aoi-chan Panic! (1983–1984), was nominated in 1985. His second nomination came in 1993 for Usagi Paradise (うさぎパラダイス, Usagi Paradaisu) (1990–1992), followed the next year by a nomination for Neko Mēwaku (ねこめ〜わく) (1991–2004). In 2002, Hataraku Shōjo: Tekipaki Workin' Love (はたらく少女 てきぱきワーキン♥ラブ, Hataraku Shōjo Tekipaki Wākin Rabu) (1995–2001) was nominated. Yomikiri Mono no... (よみきりものの...) (2006–2009) was nominated in 2010, followed by Akaneko no Akuma (あかねこの悪魔) (2009–2013) in 2014, and Natsu ni Sekiran'un made (夏に積乱雲まで) (2015–2016) in 2017.

Some of his older and uncollected works have been rereleased through Enterbrain, beginning with Pineapple Mitai (パイナップルみたい♥) and Chotto Commercial (ちょっとコマーシャル, Chotto Komāsharu).

== Works ==
All works are listed chronologically within each section.

=== Audio albums ===
These are either soundtrack albums for Takemoto's games or audio drama albums based on his manga.

- Otoban Neko Mēwaku (音盤ねこめ〜わく) (July 1994)
- Ujauja Paradise: Izumi Takemoto Original Album (うじゃうじゃパラダイス 竹本泉オリジナルアルバム, Ujauja Paradaisu: Orijinaru Arubamu) (May 1994)
- Otoban Hatarakimono (音盤はたらきもの) (January 1996)
- Daino Island Soundtrack (だいな♥あいらん音径, Daina Airan Onkei) (February 1997)
- Teketeke My Heart Drama CD (てけてけマイハートDrama CD, Teketeke Mai Hāto Dorama CD) (April 2006)
- Otoban Lup Salad (音盤ルプ★さらだ, Otoban Rupu Sarada) (February 2008)
- Takemoto Izumi Utakore Otoban: Datam Polystar Uta no Album (竹本泉うたこれ音盤 データムポリスター歌のアルバム, Takemoto Izumi Utakore Otoban: Dētamu Porisutā Uta no Arubamu) (December 2009)
  - Contains music from Hataraku Shōjo: Tekipaki Workin' Love, Neko Mēwaku, and Rupupu Cube Lup Salad games from Datam Polystar.

=== Cover and other illustrations ===
Takemoto illustrated these works:

- Sayori na Parallel Gaiden: Mayaya Iriri Panic (さよりなパラレル外伝 マヤヤイリリぱにっく, Sayori na Parareru Gaiden: Mayaya Iriri Panikku) by Osamu Kudō, based on Takemoto's manga
  - Volume 1 (November 1996, Takeshobo, ISBN 4812402530)
  - Volume 2 (January 1997, Takeshobo, ISBN 481240276X)
- Tekipaki Workin' Love: The Novel (小説 てきぱきワーキン♥ラブ, Tekipaki Wākin Rabu) by Ryunosuke Kingetsu (March 1999, Movic, ISBN 4896013840), based on Takemoto's manga

=== Games ===
Takemoto has had several works produced as games for various platforms. They are listed chronologically.

- Yumimi Mix (ゆみみみっくす, Yumimi Mikkusu) (January 1993, Mega-CD)
- Yumimi Mix (1993, FM-Towns)
- Yumimi Mix Remix (ゆみみみっくすREMIX, Yumimi Mikkusu Rimikkusu) (July 1995, Saturn)
- Twin Qix (ついんくいっくす, Tsuin Kuikkusu) (1995, Arcade)
- Rupupu Cube Lup Salad (るぷぷキューブ ルプ★さらだ, Rupupu Kyūbu Rupu Sarada) (August 1996, PlayStation (SLPS-00416))
- Hataraku Shōjo: Tekipaki Workin' Love (はたらく少女 てきぱきワーキン♥ラブ, Hataraku Shōjo Tekipaki Wākin Rabu) (March 1997, PC Engine)
- Para PAR∀ Paradise (ぱらPAR∀パラダイス, Para Para Paradaisu) (March 1997, FM Towns)
- Para PAR∀ Paradise (August 1997, Windows 95)
- Dino Island (だいな♥あいらん, Daina Airan) (February 1997, Saturn (T-4503G))
- Hataraku Shōjo: Tekipaki Workin' Love FX (March 1998, PC-FX)
- Yumimi Mix Remix (March 1998, Windows 95)
- Dino Island (April 1998, Windows 95)
- Click Manga: Click no Hi (クリックまんが クリックのひ, Kurikku Manga Kurikku no Hi) (October 1999, interactive comic, PlayStation (SLPS-02354))
- Click Manga: Click no Hi (October 1999, interactive comic, Windows 95/98)
- Rupupu Cube Lup Salad DS (January 2008, Nintendo DS)
- Rupupu Cube Lup Salad Portable...Mata Tabi (るぷぷキューブ ルプ★さらだ ぽ～たぶる ... またたび, Rupupu Kyūbu Rupu Sarada Pōtaburu...Mata Tabi) (January 2010, PSP (ULJM-05520))
- Mermaid Days (人魚Days, Ningyo Days) (June 2020, iOS / Android)

=== Manga ===
- Yumemiru July Cat (夢みる7月猫, Yumemiru Juraikyatto) (1981 in Nakayoshi, Kodansha)
- Pineapple Mitai (パイナップルみたい♥) (1982 in Nakayoshi, Kodansha)
- Aoi-chan Panic! (あおいちゃんパニック!) (1983–1984 in Nakayoshi, Kodansha)
- Hajimerudo Monogatari (ハジメルド物語) (1984 in Nakayoshi, Kodansha)
- Mahōtsukai-san Oshizuka ni! (魔法使いさんおしずかに!) (1984–1985 in Nakayoshi, Kodansha)
- Chotto Commercial (ちょっとコマーシャル, Chotto Komāsharu) (1985–1986 in Nakayoshi, Kodansha)
- Anmitsu-hime (あんみつ姫) (1986–1987 in Nakayoshi, Kodansha)
- Himawari Enogu (ひまわりえのぐ) (1988 in Nakayoshi, Kodansha)
- Usagi Paradise (うさぎパラダイス, Usagi Paradaisu) (1990–1992 in Comic Master, Hobby Japan)
- Lup Salad (ルプ★さらだ) (1990–1991 in Be Love Parfait, Kodansha)
- Neko Mēwaku (ねこめ〜わく) (1991–2004 in Apple Fantasy and Apple Mystery, Ohzora/Mugenkan)
- Chimarima Waltz (ちまりまわるつ, Chimarima Warutsu) (1992, Shufu to Seikatsu Sha)
- Apple Paradise (アップルパラダイス) (1992–1997 in Comic Master EX, Comic Master, and RPG Magazine, Hobby Japan)
- Sēfukumono (せ〜ふくもの) (1993–1994 in Apple Mystery, Ohzora)
- Twinkle Star Nonnonzie (トゥインクルスター のんのんじー) (1993–1994 in Young Animal, Hakusensha)
  - Twinkle Star Nonnonzie EX (トゥインクルスター のんのんじー EX) (2004, Hakusensha)
  - Twinkle Star Nonnonzie SUN (トゥインクルスター のんのんじー EX) (2018, Hakusensha)
- Ichigo Times (苺タイムス, Ichigo Taimusu) (1993–1995 in Haoh, Media Works)
- Shima Shima Yōbi (しましま曜日) (1993–1995, ASCII)
- Sayori na Parallel (さよりなパラレル, Sayori na Parareru) (1993–1996 in Comic Ganma, Takeshobo)
- Hatarakimono (はたらきもの) (1995, Shufu to Seikatsu Sha)
- Hataraku Shōjo: Tekipaki Workin' Love (はたらく少女 てきぱきワーキン♥ラブ, Hataraku Shōjo Tekipaki Wākin Rabu) (1995–2001 in Monthly ASCII Comic and Comic Beam, ASCII/Enterbrain)
- Nijiiro Bakuhatsu Musume (虹色♪爆発娘♥) (1996–1997, Ohzora)
- Babaroa Ehon (ばばろあえほん) (1997, Ohzora)
- Mukimono 67% (むきもの67%) (1997, Ohzora)
- Yo no Naka na Mahō (世の中なまほう) (1997, Ohzora)
- Otome Atlas (乙女アトラス, Otome Atorasu) (1997–1998 in Nora Comics DX, Gakken)
- Transistor ni Venus (トランジスタにヴィーナス, Toranjisuta ni Vīnasu) (1999–2004 in Monthly Comic Flapper, Media Factory)
- Teketeke My Heart (てけてけマイハート, Teketeke Mai Hāto) (1999–2012 in Manga Life, Takeshobo)
- Piko Piko no Kira Kira (ぴこぴこのきらきら) (2001, Ohzora)
- Yomikiri Mono (よみきり♥もの) (2001–2006 in Comic Beam, Enterbrain)
- Aru Hi no Zwei (ある日のツヴァイ, Aru Hi no Tsuvai) (2003, Tokuma Shoten)
- Sakura no Kiwa (さくらの境) (2004–2008 in Monthly Comic Flapper, Media Factory)
- Kawaii Ya (かわいいや) (2005 in Manga Time Kirara, Houbunsha)
- Takemoto Izumi no Iroiro Book (竹本泉のいろいろぶっく, Takemoto Izumi no Iroiro Bukku) (2006, SB Creative)
- Variety Mornin' (バラエティも〜にん, Baraeti Mōnin) (2006–2010 in Manga Time Kirara Carat, Houbunsha)
- Iro Iro Memo- (いろいろめもー) (2006–2009 in Gēmaga, SB Creative)
- Yomikiri Mono no... (よみきりものの...) (2006–2009 in Comic Beam, Enterbrain)
- MAGI×ES' (2007-2009 in Monthly Comic Flapper, Media Factory)
- Toaru Hi no Kuru (とある日のクル) (2009 in Peach Comics, Gakken)
  - Later re-published and continued 2013-current (as of January 2021) in Pet Comics from Shusuisha and Daitosha)
- Nichinichi ni Panorama (日々にパノラマ) (2009-2011 in Monthly Comic Flapper, Media Factory)
- Akaneko no Akuma (あかねこの悪魔) (2009-2013 in Comic Beam, Enterbrain)
- Kokome Fujōten (ここめ不定点) (2010-2013 in Manga Time Kirara, Manga Time Kirara Carat, and Manga Time Kirara Ichimaru Ichimaru, Houbunsha)
- Nagarururururuko (ながるるるるるこ) (2011-2012 in Manga Time Kirara, Houbunsha)
- Garden Shimai (がーでん姉妹, Gāden Shimai) (2012-2020 in Manga Life, Takeshobo)
- Iroiro to ka Gēmu to ka (いろいろとかゲームとか) (2013, Takeshobo)
- Shinryakumono de (シンリャクモノデ) (2013-2014 in Comic Beam, Enterbrain)
- Natsu ni Sekiran'un made (夏に積乱雲まで) (2015-2016 in Comic Beam, Enterbrain)
- Aru Hi to Aru Hi no Neko-tachi (ある日とある日の猫たち) (2016, Daitosha)

=== Anime ===
- Apocalypse Hotel (アポカリプスホテル, Apokaripusu Hoteru) (2025, original character designs)

== Awards and recognition ==
Takemoto has been nominated seven times for the Seiun Award in the Best Comic category but didn't win.

Year	Organization	Award title, Category	Work	Result	Refs
1981	Kodansha	Shōjo Friend / Nakayoshi Rookie Manga Award	Yumemiru July Cat (夢みる7月猫, Yumemiru Juraikyatto)	Honorable mention	
1985	Japan Science Fiction Fan Groups' Association	Seiun Award, Best Comic	Aoi-chan Panic!	Nominated	
1993	Japan Science Fiction Fan Groups' Association	Seiun Award, Best Comic	Usagi Paradise (うさぎパラダイス, Usagi Paradaisu)	Nominated	
1994	Japan Science Fiction Fan Groups' Association	Seiun Award, Best Comic	Neko Mēwaku (ねこめ〜わく)	Nominated	
2002	Japan Science Fiction Fan Groups' Association	Seiun Award, Best Comic	Hataraku Shōjo: Tekipaki Workin' Love (はたらく少女 てきぱきワーキン♥ラブ, Hataraku Shōjo Tekipaki Wākin Rabu)	Nominated	
2010	Japan Science Fiction Fan Groups' Association	Seiun Award, Best Comic	Yomikiri Mono no... (よみきりものの...)	Nominated	
2014	Japan Science Fiction Fan Groups' Association	Seiun Award, Best Comic	Akaneko no Akuma (あかねこの悪魔)	Nominated	
2017	Japan Science Fiction Fan Groups' Association	Seiun Award, Best Comic	Natsu ni Sekiran'un made (夏に積乱雲まで)	Nominated	
