= Late-night anime =

Anime broadcast in Japan during the late night and early morning hours

In Japan, late-night anime (深夜アニメ, shin'ya anime) refers to anime series broadcast on television during the night, usually between 10 p.m. and 4 a.m. JST.

== History ==
The earliest late-night anime titles include Sennin Buraku (1963–1964), Golgo 13 (1971), Lemon Angel (1987), and Super Zugan (1992). Three of them were broadcast on Fuji TV, while Golgo 13 aired on TBS. Sennin Buraku was from the longest-running manga ever, originally serialised in the adult magazine Weekly Asahi Geinō from 1956 to 2014. Lemon Angel was a TV anime spin-off of the Hentai OVA Cream Lemon and was based on the 80's J-pop Idol group Lemon Angel. Super Zugan was from a manga about mahjong. Those titles received some attention, however, they remained as single experimental programs.

The title considered to be the true pioneer of late-night anime is Those Who Hunt Elves (1996) on TV Tokyo. At the time, several late-night radio talk shows hosted by various voice actors were popular. As a genre, those programs were called "aniraji", the abbreviation of anime and rajio (radio). TV producers thought that if anime-related radio programs late at night can be popular, then anime television programs on late night should work too. The results succeeded as they had hoped. Because of this, TV Tokyo continued its late-night timeslots. In 1997, the time slots were expanded, and they became the basis of the late-night anime that is known today. At the time, following the immense success of Neon Genesis Evangelion, the number of anime productions rapidly increased, with many of those titles coming to late-night slots. Nippon TV also started their late-night anime with Berserk.

In 1998, Fuji TV restarted their late-night anime. At the same time, BS satellite station WOWOW started their block with the complete version of Cowboy Bebop which had been incompletely broadcast in TV Tokyo's evening timeslot.

The first UHF late-night anime, Legend of Basara, started that year as well. However, the true rise of UHF anime came with Comic Party (2001). In 2001, BS Digital station BS-i began their time slot with Mahoromatic, making the anime one of its holy grail contents.

In 2002, Fuji TV increased the number of programs that they broadcast. However, they did not value the otherwise filler programs with nearly zero ratings. As a result, the schedules of their late-night anime became extremely unstable. For instance, when a program was on the air at 2:25 A.M., it was on the air at 1:55 A.M the next week. The program would not broadcast the week after, and two episodes were shown at 3:05 A.M. in the following week. One such extreme case was Kanon, for which they broadcast the last three episodes in a marathon. Anime fans heavily criticized this attitude, and production companies began to avoid broadcasting on Fuji TV. Since then, the number of late-night anime has decreased, and it completely disappeared in October 2004. However, in April 2005, Fuji TV released a new anime programming block: noitaminA, aiming for a young adult female audience who otherwise would not watch anime. However, non-noitaminA anime, such as Mushishi, still do not get a proper screening.

Late-night anime with adults as the target demographic has caused a rise in sales of anime shows to television stations in Japan in recent years. This type of anime is less popular outside Japan, being considered "more of a niche product."

== Late-night anime outside the national network ==
Late-night anime broadcasts that are not part of the national network primarily air in the Three Major Metropolitan Areas (Kanto, Kinki, Chukyo) or the Five Major Metropolitan Areas (which include Hokkaido and Fukuoka Prefecture, as well as adjacent Saga Prefecture, where only one private station is present). In other regions, the history of late-night anime broadcasting is limited. This is often due to the composition of broadcasting stations being determined by the production committee's intentions. Outside of the target areas, stations purchase and broadcast programs through program sales. However, some broadcasting stations outside the Three Major and Five Major Metropolitan Areas actively air late-night anime, including content from independent stations. Additionally, if a work is set in a specific region of Japan, it may be broadcast as a one-time event on the local station of that region.

Since late-night anime is broadcast during non-peak hours (the standard overall viewership rate on weekdays is approximately 33% at midnight (about half of prime time), and around 12% at 2 AM.) around 2009, achieving a rating of 2.0% or higher was considered a "passing grade," while 4.0% or higher was deemed "high viewership." In the 2020s, with the increasing popularity of internet streaming, ratings in the 2% range are also reported as indicative of high viewership.

== Censorship ==
Japanese TV stations do not have a clear detailed system of parental guidelines. The only clear rule is that, except in the case of a pre-pubescent boy, they cannot show sexual organs. However, they do have many tacit understandings of self-restriction. Bare breasts, for example, are difficult to broadcast on prime time.

== See also ==
- UHF anime
