= Weekly magazines in Japan =

The term shūkanshi (Japanese: 週刊誌; lit. 'weekly magazine') generally refers to weekly magazines published in Japan, including politically provocative weekly tabloid newspapers.

As noted by Watanabe and Gamble in the Japan Media Review and in their book A Public Betrayed, the genre is "often described as bizarre blends of various types of U.S. magazines, such as Newsweek, The New Yorker, People, Penthouse, and The National Enquirer".

In Japan, weekly magazines have been a source of antisemitic articles, including Shukan Bunshun, Marco Polo, and Shukan Shincho, which have repeatedly published articles denying the Holocaust. Such magazines have also been hotbeds of articles that disparage neighboring countries, especially South Korea, as well as invasions of privacy towards celebrities; for instance, Bubka (which has since transitioned into a general Japanese idol magazine) was involved in a lawsuit for their 2002 publication of unauthorized childhood photos of several female idols. Shukan Shincho was ordered by the Supreme Court of Japan to pay damages to a Soka Gakkai member for publishing an unsubstantiated allegation of murder, and has been criticized for sensationalistic stories regarding a disputed Paleolithic settlement site in Japan. The magazine has also been rebuked for publishing the names and photographs of minors who have been accused of criminal acts, even before their trials began. Women-oriented magazines have also been known to publish critical or speculatory articles pertaining to the Japanese imperial family, in defiance of the chrysanthemum taboo.

== Reliability ==
Alongside a small percentage of solid investigative reporting, tabloids publish celebrity stories constructed from anonymously obtained "leaks" to fill their pages. The habit of publishing information that is already known but written in deliberately emphatic tones to make it appear as sensational news is also common. Variants of sensationalism are interviewing neighbors and acquaintances of the person concerned and reconstructing his entire family history by deliberately emphasizing some details and leaving out others to obtain the most sensationalistic portrait possible of the protagonist of the story, or republishing known facts by having them commented on by presumed experts capable of distorting completely the episode they are talking about. Finally, among the methods used to collect material is to publish hearsay, rumors and other unreliable sources as news. What makes it particularly difficult for readers to navigate the shūkanshi articles is that investigative articles of considerable quality are accompanied by articles that are at least questionable, with the consequence that the reader struggles to understand how much credit each article deserves.

Shūkan Bunshun has been characterized as relying on posts from 2channel/5channel, an anonymous bulletin board, in their reporting.

== See also ==
=== Publications ===
- Friday
- Josei Jishin
- Josei Seven
- Shūkan Bunshun
- Shūkan Gendai
- Shukan Shincho
- Weekly Asahi Geinō
- Weekly Playboy

=== Other ===
- WaiWai, a controversial column on Mainichi Daily News that featured translated articles from such magazines
