= The Song of Tentomushi =

Japanese anime series

- Cover art from the first volume of Tentōmushi no Uta, as published by Shogakukan

てんとう虫の歌 (Tentōmushi no Uta)
- Manga
- Written by: Noboru Kawasaki
- Published by: Shogakukan
- Imprint: Tentōmushi Comics
- Magazine: Shogakukan no Gakushō Zasshi
- Original run: 1973 – 1975
- Volumes: 4
- Anime television series
- Directed by: Hiroshi Sasagawa
- Produced by: Masatsugu Nagai
- Written by: Shigeru Yanagigawa; Takao Koyama
- Music by: Shunsuke Kikuchi
- Studio: Tatsunoko Production
- Original network: FNS (Fuji TV)
- Original run: 6 October 1974 – 26 September 1976
- Episodes: 104

The Song of Tentomushi (Japanese: てんとう虫の歌, Hepburn: Tentōmushi no Uta; lit. 'The Ladybug's Song') is a manga series by Noboru Kawasaki published from 1973 to 1975 by Shogakukan in their elementary school study magazines in the Shogakukan no Gakushō Zasshi series. The manga was collected in four volumes. An anime series adapted from the manga was created by Tatsunoko Productions. The anime was also broadcast in Italy under the title Coccinella. Following Inakappe Taishō in 1970, it was the second of Kawasaki's works to be made into animation by Tatsunoko.

== Plot ==
There are seven young brothers and sisters who grow up peacefully supported by the love and care of their parents. As a token of gratitude, the children present a trip to the couple on their wedding anniversary. This heartfelt deed, however, causes a terrible misfortune as their parents are killed while on their travels.

The sudden tragedy impacts the children, but they must eventually move past their grief to build independent lives. By working together and supporting each other, they begin a new, self-reliant chapter. Their shared determination and productivity eventually earn the respect and support of their local community.

== Cast ==
The name of the Isshuu family means "one week". Since they are a family of seven children, each of these children represent a day of the week.

Tsukimi Isshuu (一週 つきみ)
Voiced by: Mari Okamoto
The eldest daughter in the family, representing Monday. Tsukimi is 11 years old, and is in the sixth grade. She does a good job regarding housework, and even gets good grades in school. However, she struggles with her mother role in the family. In the Italian dub, she is 16 years old.
Kaji Isshuu (一週 かじ)
Voiced by: Yoshito Yasuhara
The eldest son in the family, but younger than Tsukimi. Represents Tuesday. Kaji is 10 years old, and is in the fifth grade. When it comes to his lifelong dream, he wants to be a baseball player in the original manga, but wants to be a boxer within the anime. He often scolds at the younger siblings in the family when they do not co-operate. He does a good job as the role of a father in the family, in spite of his atrocious grades at school, compared to Tsukimi's. His teacher, Mr. Ban, as punishments, uses methods on him that the Greeks used like forcing children to carry 1 or 2 buckets filled with water while standing still. In the Italian dub, he is 15 years old.
Mizuo Isshuu (一週 みずお)
Voiced by: Yoshiko Yamamoto and later Yoshiko Matsuo
The 2nd son in the family, representing Wednesday. Mizuo is 9 years old, and is in the fourth grade. He has been a prodigy since his first day of school, receiving outstanding grades in his class. He wants to be a scientist when he grows up, since he is constantly working on science experiments within school, and even in his bedroom. In the Italian dub, he is 14 years old.
Mokusuke Isshuu (一週 もくすけ)
Voiced by: Keisuke Yamashita
The 3rd son in the family, representing Thursday. Mokusuke is 8 years old, and is in the third grade. He is very fat, but he is a loving soul to the siblings despite this. He wants to be a priest when he grows up, since he performs Buddhist prayers. In the Italian dub, he is 13 years old.
Kintaro Isshuuu (一週 きんたろ)
Voiced by: Noriko Tsukase
The 4th son in the family, representing Friday. Kintaro is 7 years old, and is in the second grade. He is a school bully and even torments Kaji, but he is othwise very kind. He co-operates with his younger brother, Tsuchimaru, only to get into mischief. He wants to be a farmer when he grows up. In the Italian dub, he is 8 years old.
Tsuchimaru Isshuu (一週 つちまる)
Voiced by: Yuuko Maruyama
The 5th son in the family, representing Saturday. Tsuchimaru is 6 years old, and is in the first grade. He is quite intelligent compared to his older brother Kintaro, but is more kind and friendly. He even has a skin head. When he grows up, he wishes to be a detective. In the Italian dub, he is 7 years old.
Hiyoko Isshuu (一週 ひよこ)
Voiced by: Minori Matsushima
The 2nd daughter in the family and the central character of the series, representing Sunday. Hiyoko is 5 years old, and does not go to school due to her young age. She is very naughty and precocious at times, but she is a friendly girl who depends on the future of her family's lifestyle thanks to Tentomushi, a ladybug she found. She is considered to be the founder of the lifestyle. When she grows up, she wants to be a veterinarian, since she loves animals. Her age remains the same in the Italian dub.
