= Friday (magazine) =

Japanese weekly magazine

- Categories: Photographs
- Frequency: Shūkan (weekly)
- First issue: 9 November 1984; 40 years ago
- Company: Kodansha
- Country: Japan
- Based in: Tokyo
- Language: Japanese
- Website: friday.kodansha.ne.jp

Friday (フライデー, Furaidē) is a Japanese weekly magazine that contains celebrity gossip, politics, news, and simply. It is published by Kodansha. New issues are released every Friday, hence the name.

== History ==
Friday was launched on 9 November 1984. The magazine is best known for its candid, paparazzi-style photographs of celebrities and politicians, accompanied by often scandalous rumors of their private lives. Such coverage is considered too risqué for daily newspapers. To be featured in Friday in this way is sometimes referred to as "Getting Fridayed" Friday Sareru (フライデーされる).

A special supplementary issue called Friday Dynamite is published several times a year.

In 2003, the magazine published its 1,000th issue – a double issue covering both the Golden Week and the Bon Festival/Christmas and holiday season.

Friday is one of three Japanese weekly magazines, along with Flash, also published by Kobunsha, and Focus, published by Shinchosha, that are collectively known as the "3F". In the early 1990s, following the rapid rise of the 3F, other major publishers began issuing their own tabloid-style magazines. In addition to the appearance of Emma (Bungeishunjū) and Touch (Shogakukan), the "3F" became the "3FET"; however, Emma and Touch were not able to compete with Flash and Friday. Both were shut down by the end of the decade. After Focus was discontinued in 2001, Friday became the most widely circulated weekly magazine. It has 409,082 subscribers according to the Japan Magazine Society. At its peak in the mid-1990s, Friday was selling roughly 600,000 issues per week.

== Editors ==
※ Source: Kodansha no 100-nen (company history)

Name	Term	Remarks
Toshio Ito(伊藤 寿男)	Jul 1984 – Jun 1985	Former "Shūkan Gendai" editor-in-chief. Later founded Tamis Co. Ltd. and issued Shūkan Tamis at Gakken.
Akihiko Terashima(寺島 昭彦)	Jun 1985 – Apr 1987	After retiring from the editorial office he took on the editor of "Shūkan Gendai".
Makoto Sugawa(須川 真)	Apr 1987 – Apr 1988	
Hiroshi Moriiwa(森岩 弘)	Apr 1988 – Mar 1991	After retiring from the editorial office he took on the editor of "Shūkan Gendai".
Masahiko Motoki(元木 昌彦)	Mar 1991 – Mar 1993	After retiring from the editorial office he took on the editor of "Shūkan Gendai".
Tetsu Suzuki(鈴木 哲)	Mar 1993 – Jul 1996	After retiring as editor-in-chief, he transferred to another department, and appointed editor-in-chief of "Shūkan Gendai".
Masashi Tani(谷 雅志)	Jul 1996 – Mar 1998	
Haruyuki Kato(加藤 晴之)	Mar 1998 – Jul 2000	After being editor-in-chief, he was in charge of the publication department of the Gakugei Tosho Publishing Department, and editor in charge of "Shūkan Gendai".
Tomoyuki Suzuki(鈴木 智之)	Jul 2000 – Jun 2002	
Kazuchika Dasuze(出樋 一親)	Jun 2002 – Jul 2004	
Kenji Nakamoto(中本 顕二)	Jul 2004 – Mar 2006	
Kazuchika Dasuze(出樋 一親)	Mar 2006 – Apr 2008	Second inaugural editor-in-chief. From the "Shūkan Gendai" editorial department (editor-in-chief) transfer.
Hisayuki Semba(仙波 久幸)	Apr 2008 – Jun 2009	
Atsushi Akiyoshi(秋吉 敦司)	Jun 2009 – Jun 2012	

== Controversies ==
- In December 1986, Friday published an article alleging that the TV personality Takeshi Kitano was having an affair with a college student. Kitano was furious and felt that he and his family had been harassed by the magazine. He and a group of followers attacked the Friday offices in retaliation. The men involved were charged and received suspended sentences. During the trials, the information and sources that the magazine used were criticized. Thus, this incident caused a decline in the magazine's circulation.
- In September 1991, Happy Science protested the content of an article. This caused widespread demonstrations and calls for legal action. A feature article posted later in the 1,000th issue said, "the work of Kodansha was temporarily stopped due to this one case."
- According to a report in May 2000, Prime Minister Yoshirō Mori offered a delicate English greeting to the President of United States, Bill Clinton. This was reported on 21 July, in the 2000th issue of Friday relating to 26th G8 summit and Shūkan Bunshun. In addition, journalist Shūkan Asahi is skeptical of the report of Friday and verified the articles, exposing that the articles were created by Akio Takahata, editorial writer of Mainichi Newspapers.
- In October 2006, the magazine published a Scenic Kiss Photo in Minamiaoyama, Minato, Tokyo with Democratic Party of Japan member Goshi Hosono and freelance announcer Mona Yamamoto at the top of the spread page. Because Hosono was in a relationship, the affair triggered a scandal, leading to his resignation in October of that year. As a representative on behalf of the Democratic policy investigation, Chairman Yamamoto stopped making appearances on Tetsuya Chikushi, News23 from 2 October on the grounds of "poor physical conditions", and left on 23 October. This photo was awarded the 2006 "Editors' Choice Magazine Journalism Award Topic Award."
- In August 2011, Friday published an exposé of TV personality Shinsuke Shimada and his ties to Yakuza. Shimada admitted exchanging text messages with the leader of an Osaka-based gang affiliated with Yamaguchi-gumi and was forced to resign as a result. He later sued Kodansha for compensation in the amount of 55 million yen, stating that his honor and reputation had been irreparably damaged by allegations. The Tokyo District Court ordered Kodansha to pay 3.3 million yen and rejected Shimada's demand to have the magazine apologize.
- In the 23 June 2017, issue, an article alleged that actor Keisuke Koide had been drinking with and had sex with a female minor. Koide admitted to the crimes and was subsequently suspended by his talent agency. Prosecutors indicted him on the charge of drinking but dropped the charge of statutory rape against Koide, as the minor-in-question desired an out-of-court settlement.

== Issue circulation ==
Issue circulation (After April 2008) (Japan Magazine Society)
	Jan–Mar	Apr–Jun	Jul–Sep	Oct–Dec
2008		380,000 copies	375,834 copies	364,616 copies
2009	345,000 copies	335,417 copies	340,000 copies	330,231 copies
2010	330,231 copies	315,734 copies	324,892 copies	305,546 copies
2011	303,625 copies	306,000 copies	308,131 copies	311,250 copies
2012	311,250 copies	296,100 copies	311,850 copies	305,910 copies
2013	293,334 copies	275,917 copies	269,167 copies	269,167 copies
2014	273,637 copies	275,834 copies	277,500 copies	278,462 copies
2015	260,000 copies	263,334 copies	260,910 copies	253,847 copies
2016	254,167 copies	256,364 copies	257,500 copies	254,167 copies
2017	254,167 copies	254,167 copies	250,833 copies	
