= Wako (retailer) =

Japanese high end retailer

Coordinates: 35°40′18″N 139°45′54″E

Wako Co., Ltd.
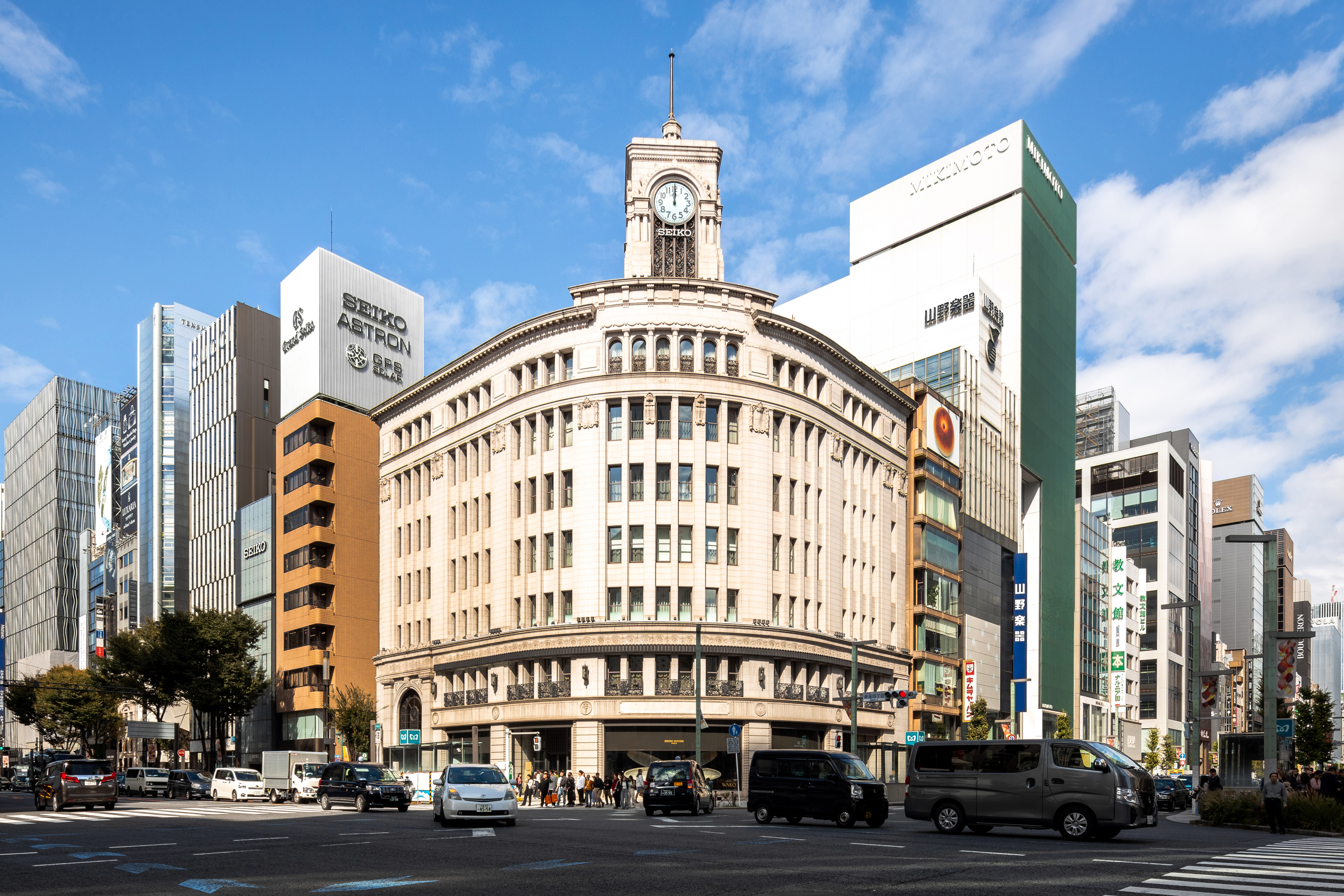
- Seiko House Ginza (Ginza Wako) in October 2024
- Native name: 株式会社和光
- Type: Subsidiary
- Industry: Retail
- Founded: 1881; 145 years ago
- Founder: Kintarō Hattori
- Headquarters: 4-5-11 Ginza, Chūō, Tokyo, Japan
- Parent: Seiko Group Corporation
- Website: www.wako.co.jp

Wako Co., Ltd. (株式会社和光, Kabushiki-gaisha Wakō) is a department store retailer in Japan, best known for its flagship store, commonly referred to as the Ginza Wako, located in the heart of Tokyo’s Ginza shopping district. The store is renowned for its watches, jewelry, chocolate, porcelain, dishware, handbags, and upscale imported goods.

Wako Co., Ltd. was established in 1947 as the successor to the retail division of K. Hattori (known in Japan as Hattori Tokeiten, now Seiko) and began operations in a temporary location. In 1952, it commenced business in its current building. The Ginza Wako building was originally completed in 1932 as the headquarters of K. Hattori, situated at the corner of the Ginza 4-chome intersection. The Seiko headquarters was later relocated to Toranomon, and in 2016, it moved to Ginza 1-chome.

In 2022, the Ginza Wako building was reopened as Seiko House Ginza following renovation work.

In addition to its main store, Ginza Wako, Wako operates five branches in the Ginza area, including Seiko Dream Square and the Grand Seiko Boutique Ginza. It also has locations at Hotel Nikko Osaka, Haneda Airport Terminals 1 and 2, Nagoya Kanko Hotel, Matsuzakaya Nagoya, Daimaru Fukuoka Tenjin, and Odakyu Department Store in Shinjuku.

== History ==
Wako was founded in 1881 by Kintarō Hattori as a watch and jewelry shop called K. Hattori (now Seiko Group Corporation) in Ginza. In 1947, the retail division split off as Wako Co., Ltd.

From 1894 to 1921, the Hattori Clock Tower stood on the site that Wako occupies today. In 1921, the Hattori Clock Tower was demolished to rebuild a new one. The reconstruction was delayed due to the Great Kantō earthquake of September 1, 1923. The new tower was completed in 1932 as the K. Hattori Building. In homage to its predecessor, the new store was also fitted with a clock.

The 1932 building was designed by Jin Watanabe in art deco influenced neoclassical style. Its curved granite façade and clock tower form the central landmark for the district and one of the few buildings in the area left standing after World War II. The building functioned as the Tokyo PX store during the Allied Occupation of Japan from 1945 to 1952. The clock tower plays the famous Westminster Chimes.

In addition to Seiko and luxury overseas brand watches, Wako also offers private label watches as regular products, using Seiko-made movements. The dials of these watches bear the name "WAKO" instead of "SEIKO." Since the 60th anniversary commemorative model of the clock tower in 1992, Wako has released limited-edition Wako-branded models every ten years. In 2022, a dress watch equipped with the Caliber 6898, an ultra-thin movement used in Credor, was released.

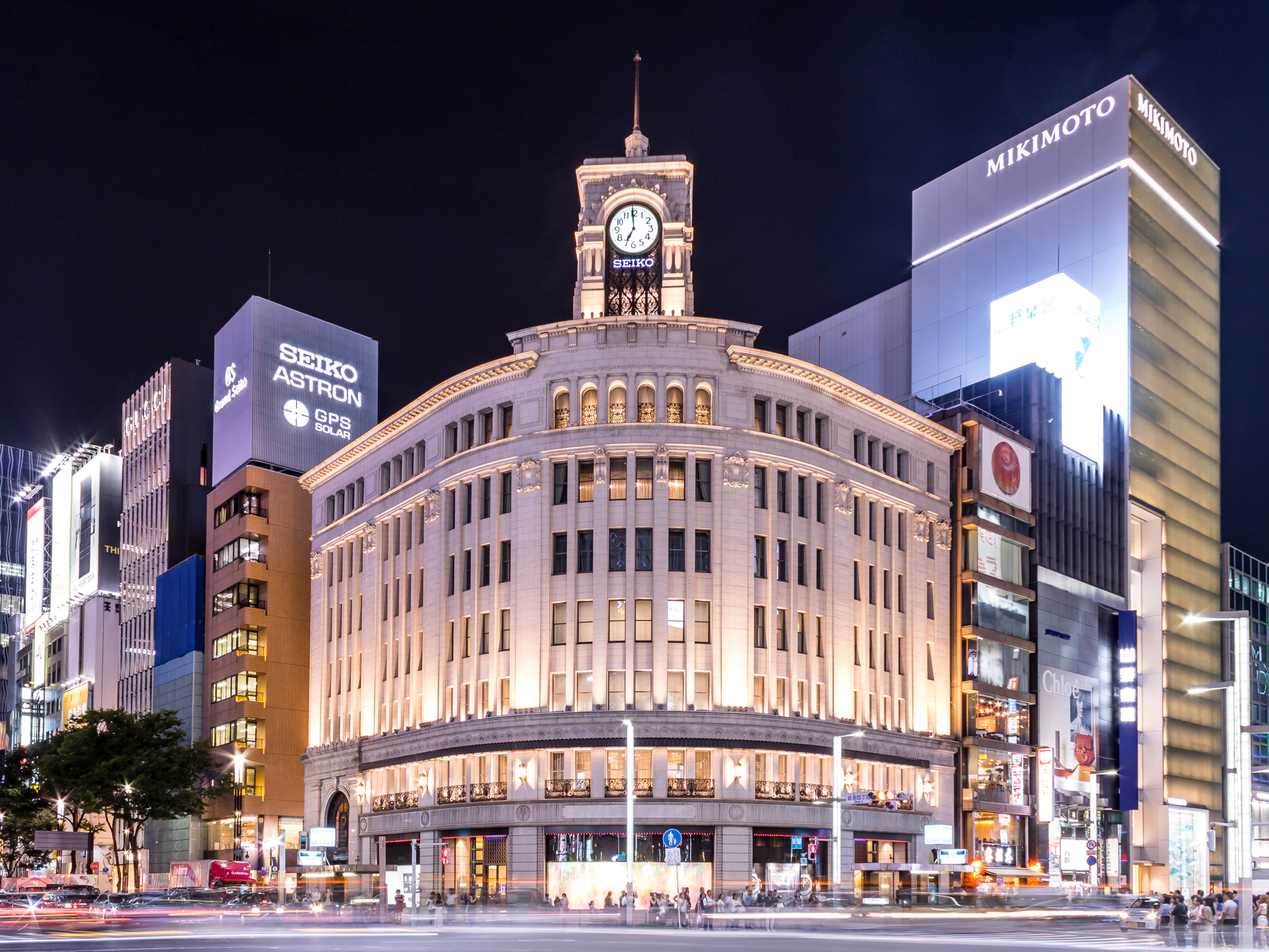
The Wako store in Ginza at night, 2018

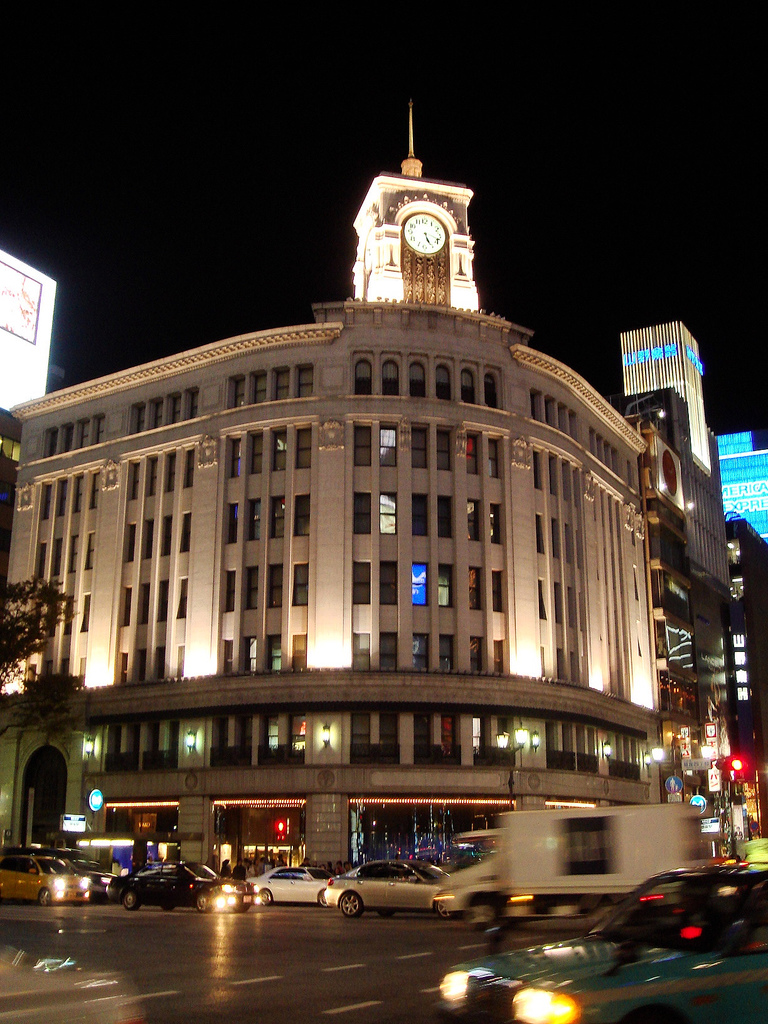
The Wako store in Ginza at night, 2007

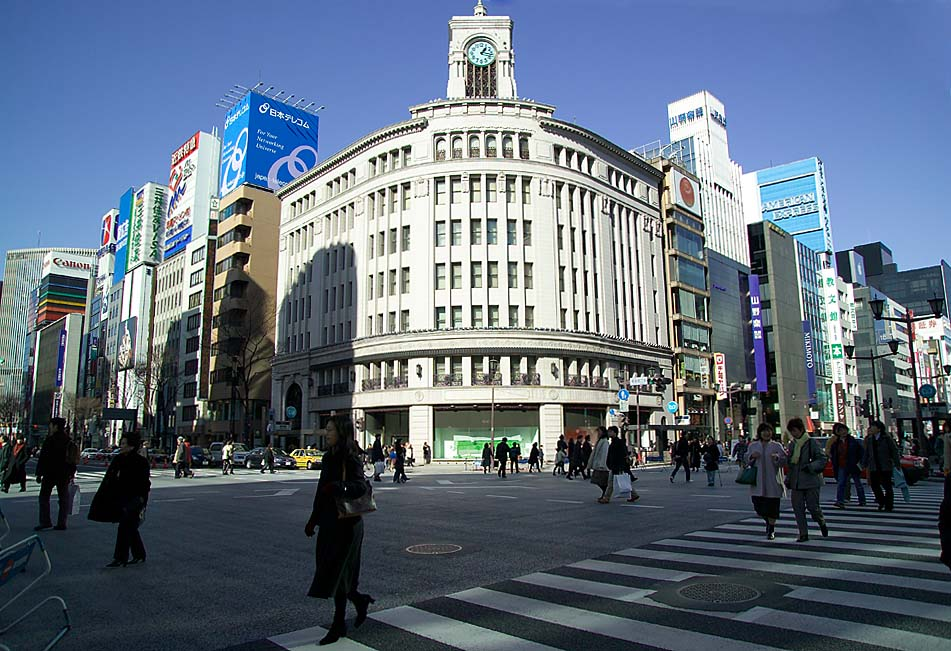
The Wako store in Ginza, 2005

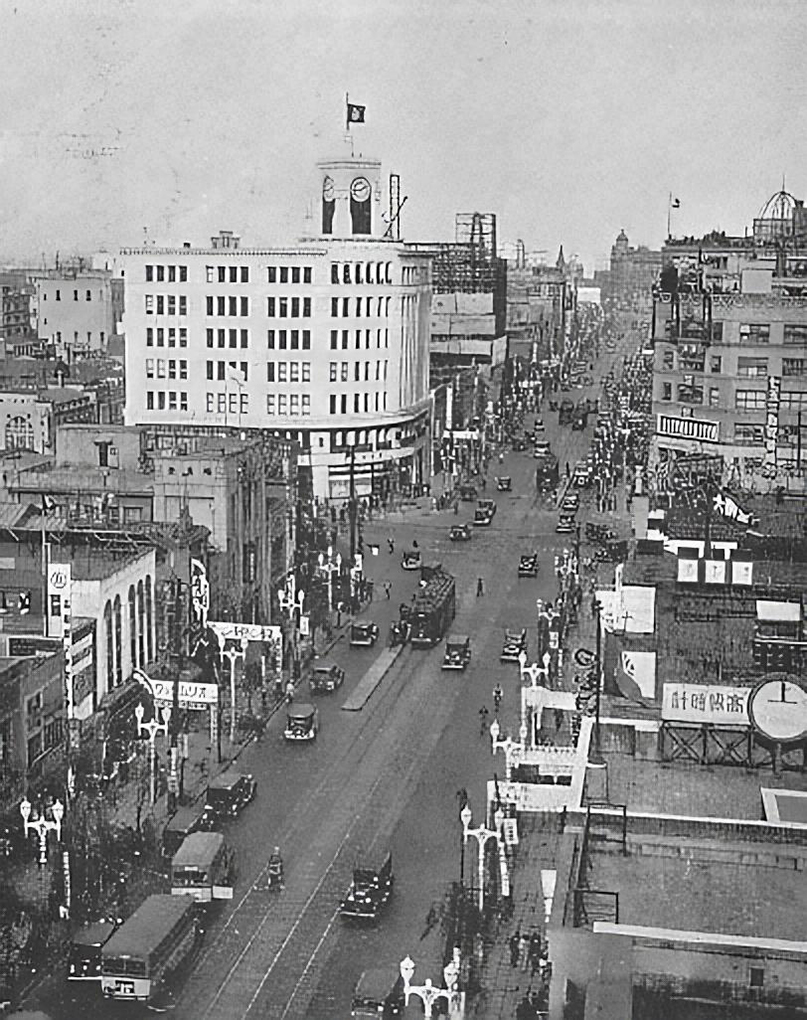
The Wako store in Ginza, 1933

== Seiko House Ginza: Floor Layout ==
The basement floor features tableware, interior decorations, mantel clocks, carpets, and other home items. The first floor offers a selection of Seiko watches alongside imported luxury watch brands such as Jaeger-LeCoultre, Glashütte Original, IWC, Panerai, Franck Muller, Baume & Mercier, and Piaget. On the second floor, visitors will find the Grand Seiko Flagship Boutique and the Credor Jewelry Salon, which offer Japan-exclusive and Wako-exclusive models. Here, customers may place custom orders for unique, one-of-a-kind Grand Seiko timepieces, provided certain conditions are met, such as a high budget and the use of precious metals.

The third floor offers women's clothing, handbags, and accessories, while the fourth floor features men's clothing, eyeglasses, and accessories. The fifth floor houses a guest lounge accessible only to invited visitors, and the sixth floor contains a hall used for events.

On the seventh floor is Atelier Ginza, where a small team of Seiko’s most elite watchmakers craft the brand’s pinnacle mechanical timepieces, including the Grand Seiko Kodo. Atelier Ginza also offers exclusive tours of the watchmaking process, limited to one specially invited group per week.

== In popular culture ==
The tower was destroyed by Godzilla in the 1954 film. Its destruction has thus been featured in further media of the franchise, including the 2016 film Shin Godzilla and 2023 film Godzilla Minus One.

Wako's flagship store at Ginza served as a model for the titular hotel in the 2025 anime Apocalypse Hotel.
