= Musashi (manga) =

Japanese manga series

- First tankōbon volume cover

ムサシ
- Genre: Historical drama
- Manga
- Written by: Kazuo Koike
- Illustrated by: Noboru Kawasaki
- Published by: Shogakukan; Studio Ship (print); Homesha (print); Shōnen Gahōsha (print)
- Imprint: Shōnen Sunday Comics
- Magazine: Weekly Shōnen Sunday
- Original run: August 25, 1974 – May 15, 1977
- Volumes: 13

Musashi (Japanese: ムサシ) is a Japanese manga series written by Kazuo Koike and illustrated by Noboru Kawasaki. It was serialized in Shogakukan's shōnen manga magazine Weekly Shōnen Sunday from August 1974 to May 1977, with its chapters collected in thirteen tankōbon volumes.

== Publication ==
Weekly Shōnen Sunday No. 35 (August 1974) cover, the issue where Musashi began its serialization

Written by Kazuo Koike and illustrated by Noboru Kawasaki, Musashi was serialized in Shogakukan's shōnen manga magazine Weekly Shōnen Sunday in two periods, the first period was published from August 25, 1974, to August 15, 1976. The second period was published from September 12, 1976, to May 15, 1977, with Shogakukan collected its chapters in thirteen tankōbon volumes as of September 1977.

Several publishers published the series in long term, first Studio Ship published the series in ten bunkoban volumes from April 1986 to February 1988. Homesha republished the ten volumes from February to June 2001. Shōnen Gahōsha published the series in seven wide-ban volumes from February to June 2003.
