= Captain (manga) =

Japanese manga series

- Captain volume 1 bunko

キャプテン (Kyaputen)
- Genre: Sports
- Manga
- Written by: Akio Chiba
- Published by: Shueisha
- Magazine: Bessatsu Shōnen Jump; Monthly Shōnen Jump
- Original run: 1972 – 1979
- Volumes: 15
- Anime television film
- Directed by: Satoshi Dezaki
- Studio: Eiken
- Original network: NNS (NTV)
- Released: April 2, 1980
- Anime film
- Directed by: Satoshi Dezaki
- Studio: Eiken
- Released: July 18, 1981
- Runtime: 95 minutes
- Anime television series
- Directed by: Satoshi Dezaki
- Studio: Eiken
- Licensed by: SA/SEA: Medialink
- Original network: NNS (NTV)
- Original run: January 10, 1983 – July 4, 1983
- Episodes: 26
- Manga
- Written by: Cozy Jōkura
- Published by: Shueisha
- Magazine: Grand Jump
- Original run: April 5, 2017 – present
- Manga

Captain 2
- Written by: Cozy Jōkura
- Published by: Shueisha
- Magazine: Grand Jump Mucha
- Original run: April 24, 2019 – present

Captain (Japanese: キャプテン, Hepburn: Kyaputen) is a baseball manga series by Akio Chiba which ran in Monthly Shōnen Jump (published by Shueisha) from 1972 to 1979. This series ran concurrently with another Chiba manga series Play Ball, which ran in Weekly Shōnen Jump (also published by Shueisha) from 1973 to 1978. Captain, along with Play Ball, won the 22nd Shogakukan Manga Award for shōnen in 1977.

The manga was adapted into a film by Eiken and released in theaters on 1981-07-18. It was also adapted into a 26 episode anime television series which aired on NTV from 1983-01-10 to 1983-07-04. The TV series was also directed by Satoshi Dezaki. The Captain TV series was ranked 95th in the top 100 favorite anime titles of all time in a web poll conducted by TV Asahi in 2005. In a 2006 TV Asahi survey of Japanese celebrities, the Captain TV series ranked 13th in a list of the top 100 responses.

A spin-off manga by Cozy Jōkura began serialization in Shueisha's Grand Jump magazine in April 2017.

A sequel manga also by Cozy Jōkura, titled Captain 2, began serialization in Grand Jump Mucha in April 2019.

The story features 4 captains. When the captain graduate from school, the next captain becomes the protagonist.

== Film ==
=== Staff ===
- Original Creator: Akio Chiba
- Planning: Takeshi Yoshikawa (NTV)
- Producers: Tōru Horikoshi (NTV), Masayasu Sagisu (Eiken)
- Director: Satoshi Dezaki
- Production Assistant: Hiroyuki Kamii
- Animation Directors: Shigetaka Shimizu, Keizō Shimizu
- Screenplay: Noboru Shiroyama
- Photographer: Shin Iizuka
- Music: Toshiyuki Kimori
- Art Director: Moritoshi Endō
- Audio Director: Hiroshi Sakonjō
- Editors: Toshiaki Yabuki, Masahiko Kawana

== TV series ==
=== Staff ===
- Original Creator: Akio Chiba
- Planning: Takeshi Yoshikawa (NTV)
- Producers: Tōru Horikoshi (NTV), Masayasu Sagisu (Eiken)
- Director: Satoshi Dezaki
- Scripts: Noboru Shiroyama, Keisuke Fujikawa
- Animation Directors: Shigetaka Shimizu, Keizō Shimizu
- Music: Toshiyuki Kimori

=== Theme songs ===
Both songs were composed and arranged by Toshiyuki Kimori, with lyrics by Michio Yamagami. Vocals were by 99Harmony.

- Opening: Kimi wa Nanika ga Dekiru
- Ending: Arigatō
