= Shūkan Shinchō =

Japanese weekly news magazine

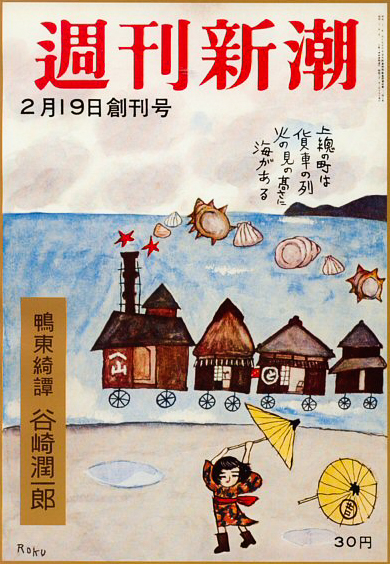
- Cover of the first issue of Shūkan Shinchō (19 February 1956)
- Categories: News magazine
- Frequency: Weekly
- Founded: 1956
- First issue: 19 February 1956
- Company: Shinchosha
- Country: Japan
- Based in: Tokyo
- Language: Japanese
- Website: Shukan Shincho

Shūkan Shinchō (週刊新潮) is a Japanese conservative weekly news magazine based in Tokyo, Japan. It is considered one of the most influential weekly magazines in the country and is the first Japanese weekly magazine founded by a publishing company which does not own a major newspaper.

== History and profile ==
Shūkan Shinchō was first published on 19 February 1956. The cover of the first issue featured an illustration by Japanese artist Rokuro Taniuchi. The magazine is part of Shinchosha, which also founded it, and is published on a weekly basis. Its headquarters is in Tokyo.

Shūkan Shinchō is a general-news magazine, but it targets men. It claims that "[its] average reader is 41.4 years old, 34.2% are white collar, and 60.9% own their own homes" and that "the majority [of its readers] are upper class, wealthy and intellectually inclined". As of 2017 Mark Schreiber, a contributing writer of The Japan Times, argued that the readers of the magazine are mostly older and retired Japanese men. The major competitor of the magazine is Shūkan Bunshun.

== Content and political stance ==
Shūkan Shinchō has a nationalistic and conservative political stance. Shūkan Shinchō and its rival Shūkan Bunshun are the only major "non-establishment" weekly news-magazines that do not feature pornography. This makes them the magazines of choice for men who want to read so-called alternative news (sources other than the major newspapers and broadcasters) but who don't want to look at, or be seen looking at, pornography. As a result, these two shūkanshi (weekly magazines) are seen as more socially acceptable to read than their rivals. The layouts of these two magazines are also of a better quality than that of their direct competitors. However, these two publications have been described as "especially egregious offenders of journalistic ethics". Shūkan Shinchō is also described as a tabloid magazine by Mainichi Shimbun, a leading Japanese daily. Shūkan Shinchō was found guilty of libel in a Tokyo court for publishing an unsubstantiated allegation of murder by a Soka Gakkai member. The magazine was criticized in 2001 for sensationalistic stories regarding a disputed Paleolithic settlement site in Japan. It has also been rebuked for publishing the names and photographs of minors who have been accused of criminal acts, even before their trials began.

== Circulation ==
From October 2014 to September 2015 Shūkan Shinchō was the ninth-best selling magazine in Japan with a circulation of 537,596 copies.
