= Eiken (studio) =

Japanese animation studio

Eiken Co., Ltd.
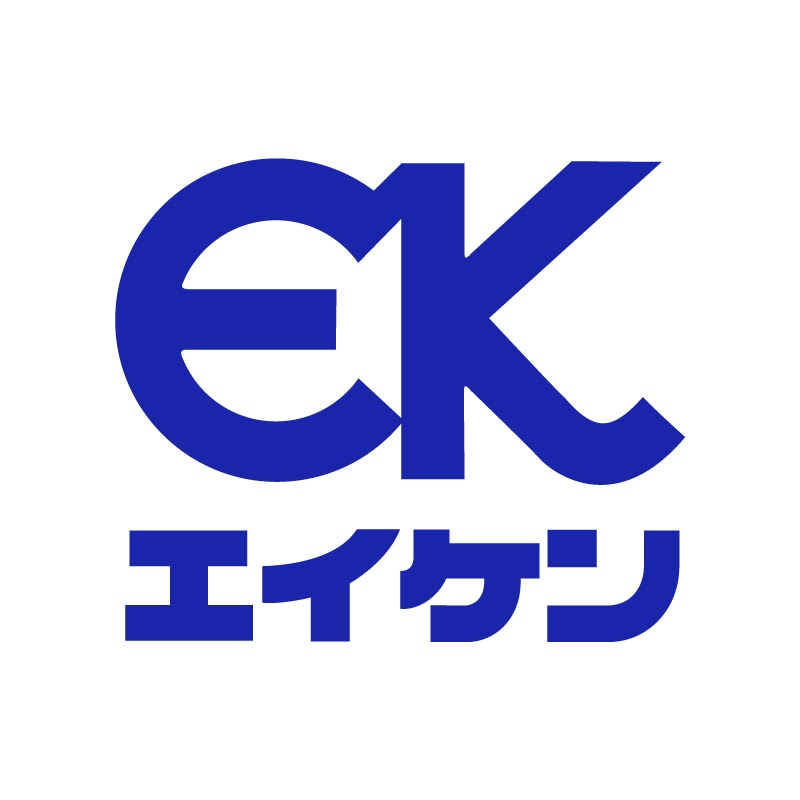
- Logo used since 1973

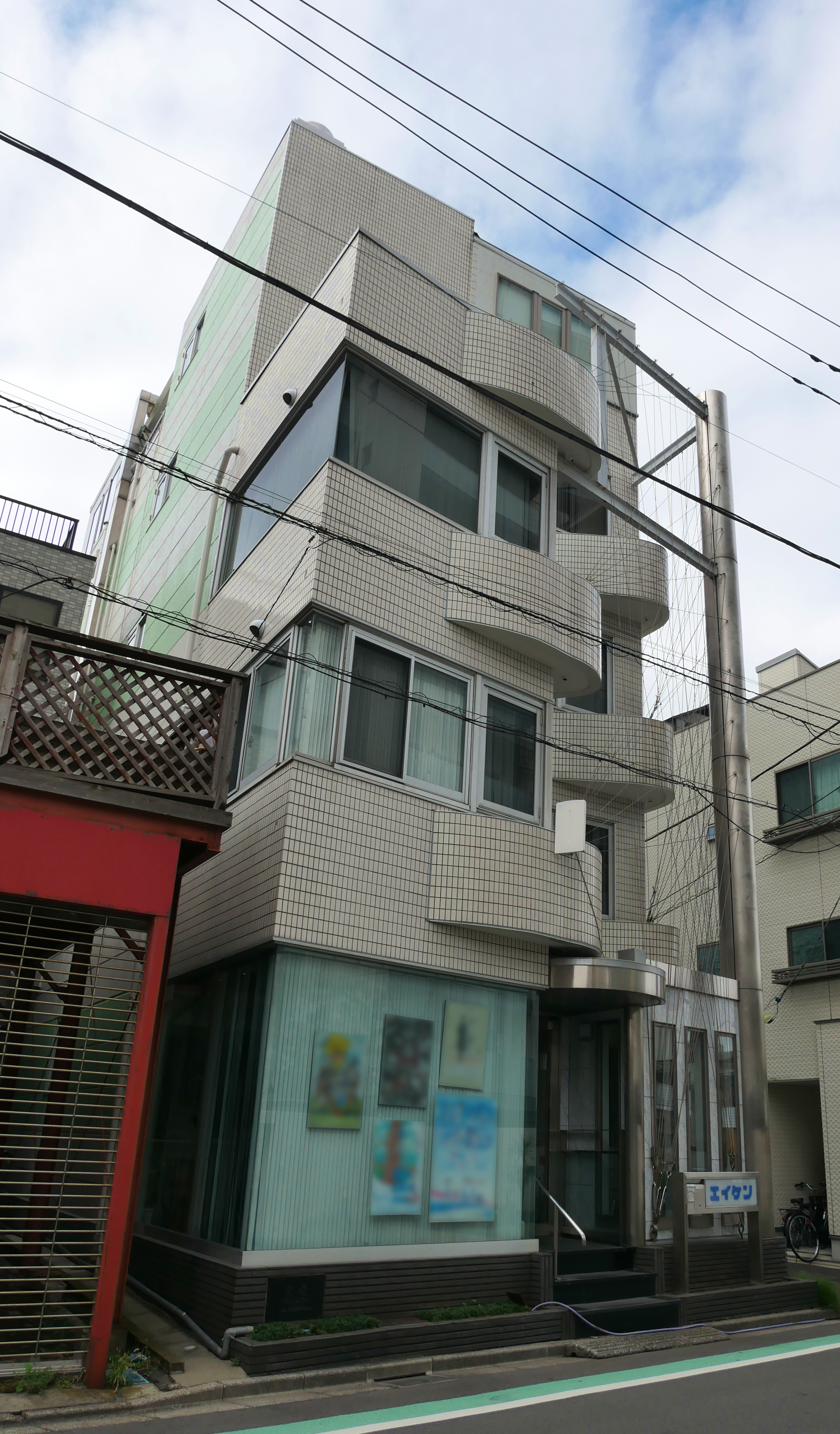
- Headquarters in Arakawa, Tokyo
- Native name: 株式会社エイケン
- Romanized name: Kabushiki gaisha Eiken
- Formerly: TCJ Video Center Co., Ltd. (1969–1973)
- Type: Kabushiki-gaisha
- Industry: Japanese animation
- Founded: March 10, 1969; 57 years ago
- Founder: Hidenori Murata
- Headquarters: Minami-Senju, Arakawa, Tokyo, Japan
- Key people: Yukio Takada (president)
- Net income: 14893,000 yen (December, 2020)
- Total assets: 823,679,000 yen (December 31, 2020)
- Number of employees: 50
- Parent: ADK Emotions (70%); Fuji Television (10%)
- Website: eiken-anime.jp

Eiken Co., Ltd. (Japanese: 株式会社エイケン, Hepburn: Kabushiki gaisha Eiken) is a Japanese animation studio in Arakawa, Tokyo, Japan. The company was formerly known as Television Corporation of Japan Co., Ltd. or TCJ before the sales division spun off to form Zuiyo Eizo. As a result, it changed its name in 1969 to Eiken. It is a wholly owned subsidiary of ADK Emotions.

== History ==
Television Corporation of Japan, Co., Ltd. Tele-Cartoons Japan
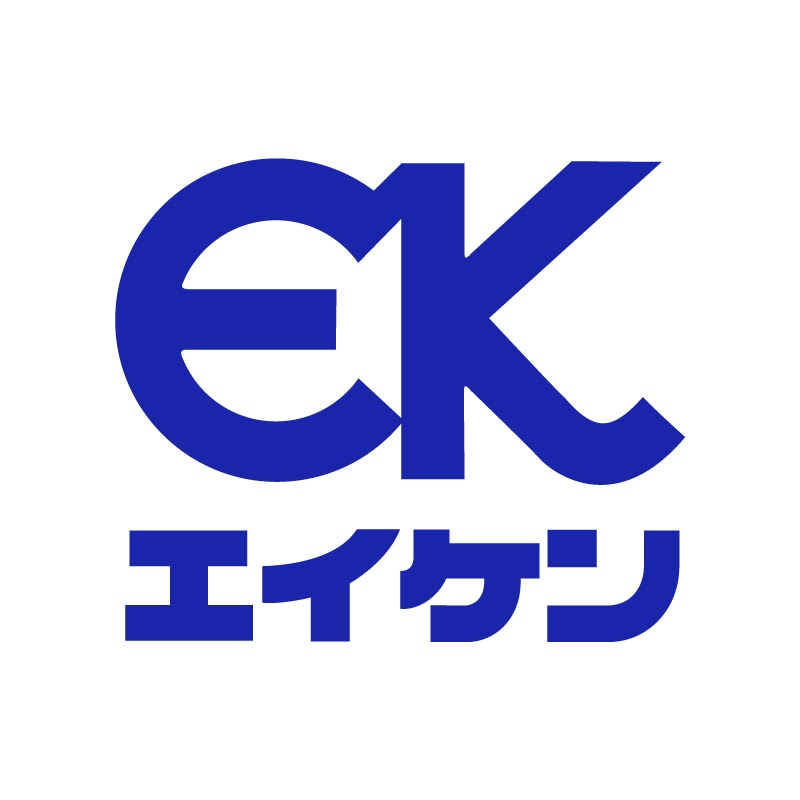
- Native name: 日本テレビジョン株式会社
- Romanized name: Nihon Terebijon Kabushiki-gaisha
- Type: Private KK
- Industry: Advertising; Japanese animation
- Founded: 1952; 74 years ago
- Defunct: 1969; 57 years ago
- Fate: Dissolved, sales division spun-off into Zuiyo Enterprise
- Successor: Zuiyo Enterprise; TCJ Video Center

The studio was established as Television Corporation of Japan (日本テレビジョン株式会社, Nihon Terebijon Kabushiki-gaisha; TCJ) in 1952. It started off producing commercials before entering the anime industry with adaptations of Ko Kojima's Sennin Buraku and Mitsuteru Yokoyama's Tetsujin 28-go. Since then, it has co-produced (with TBS) numerous anime like Super Jetter, Space Boy Soran, Noboru Kawasaki's Skyers 5 and Sanpei Shirato's Sasuke.

In March 1969, TCJ manager, Shigeto Takahashi, along with the sales division, spun off from TCJ, to form Zuiyo Enterprise. The animation division remained and spun-off itself to TCJ Video Center Co., Ltd (TCJ動画センター株式会社, TCJ Douga Senta Kabushiki-gaisha). The company struck gold with their anime adaptation of Machiko Hasegawa's long-running manga, Sazae-san. It still continues to run on Fuji TV to this day, making it the longest running anime.

== Works ==
=== TCJ era ===
- Sennin Buraku (1963–1966, Fuji TV)
- Tetsujin 28-go ("Gigantor" in North America) (1963–1966, Fuji TV, planning by Dentsu)
- 8 Man ("The 8th Man" in North America) (1963–1964, TBS)
- Super Jetter (1965–1966, TBS)
- Space Boy Soran (1965–1967, TBS)
- Prince Planet (Yūsei Shōnen Papii) (1965–1966, FNS)
- Yūsei Kamen (1966–1967)
- Bōken Gabotenjima (1967)
- Skyers 5 (1967, TBS)
- The Cricket on the Hearth (1967)
- Sasuke (1968–1969, TBS)
- Ninpū Kamui Gaiden (1969, Fuji TV, planning by Zuiyo)
- Sazae-san (1969–current, Fuji TV)
- Kamui Gaiden (1969, film)
- Dōbutsu-mura Monogatari (1970, NET)
- Bakuhatsu Gorō (1970, TBS)
- Norakuro (1970–1971, Fuji TV)
- Shin Skyers 5 (1971–1972, TBS)
- Onbu Obake (1972–1973, Yomiuri TV)

=== Eiken era ===
- Bōken Korobokkuru (1973, Yomiuri TV)
- Jim Button (1974, MBS)
- Iruka to Shōnen (1975, TBS)
- Hokahoka Kazoku (1976–1982, Fuji TV)
- UFO Warrior Daiapolon (1976, TBS)
  - UFO Senshi Daiapolon 2 (1976, Tokyo 12ch)
- Captain (1980, NTV; TV special)
- Captain (1981, film)
- Donbē Monogatari (1981, NTV)
- Captain (1983, TV series)
- Glass Mask (1984, NTV)
- Ginga Patrol PJ (1984, Fuji TV)
- Dotanba no Manā (1984–1987, Fuji TV)
- Musashi no Ken (1985–1986, TV Tokyo, "shonen" version)
- Musashi no Ken (1986, "seishun" version)
- Kotowaza House (1987–1994, Fuji TV)
- Hai Akko Desu (1988–1992, ABC)
- Shīton Dōbutsuki (1989–1990, NTV)
- Kobo-chan Special: Filled with Autumn (1990)
- Kobo-chan Special: Filled with Dreams!! (1991)
- Micro Patrol (1991, joint release in France and Japan, OVA series released in Japan as well)
- Kobo-chan (1992–1994, Yomiuri TV)
- Cooking Papa (1992–1995, ABC with Asatsu)
- Kobo-chan Special: Filled with Festivals! (1994)
- Oyako Club (1994–2013, Fuji TV)
- Ijiwaru Bā-san (second series, 1996–1997, Fuji TV)
- Kiko-chan Smile (1996–1997, TBS with Magic Bus)
- Otoko wa Tsurai yo: Torajirō Wasure na Kusa (1998, TBS with Magic Bus)
- Kobo-chan Special: The Promised Magic Day (1998)
- Suteki! Sakura Mama! (2000)
- Go! Go! Itsutsugo Land (2001–2002, with Magic Bus)
- Gokiburi-chan (2005)
- Play Ball (2005, with Magic Bus)
  - Play Ball 2nd (2006, with Magic Bus)
- Tetsujin 28-go Gao! (2013–2016, Fuji TV)
- Bonobono (2016–current, Fuji TV)
