= Kōya no Shōnen Isamu =

Japanese manga series

- Cover of the first volume of Kōya no Shōnen Isamu, as published in Japan by Shueisha

荒野の少年イサム
- Genre: Western
- Manga
- Written by: Sōji Yamakawa
- Illustrated by: Noboru Kawasaki
- Published by: Shueisha
- Magazine: Weekly Shōnen Jump
- Original run: 1971 – 1974
- Volumes: 12
- Anime television series
- Directed by: Isao Takahata; Kyosuke Mikuriya; Yoshikata Nitta; Kenzo Koizumi
- Music by: Takeo Watanabe
- Studio: Tokyo Movie
- Original network: FNS (Fuji TV)
- Original run: 4 April 1973 – 27 March 1974
- Episodes: 52

Kōya no Shōnen Isamu (荒野の少年イサム; lit. 'Boy of the Wilderness Isamu'), is a Japanese manga series written by Sōji Yamakawa and illustrated by Noboru Kawasaki. It was published in Weekly Shōnen Jump from 1971 to 1974.

It was adapted into an anime by Tokyo Movie Shinsha, Shingo Araki and Daikichiro Kusube created the character designs, while Hayao Miyazaki was in the team of animators. The series consists of 52 episodes and was originally broadcast on Fuji TV.

== Cast ==
- Akira Kamiya as Isamu
- Ichirô Murakoshi as Ned Wingate
- Iemasa Kayumi as Rhett Wingate
- Kiyoshi Kobayashi as Big Stone
- Osamu Kato as Old Wingate
- Takeshi Kuwabara as Narrator
