= Akio Chiba =

Japanese manga artist

- Born: 29 January 1943; Shenyang, Manchukuo (present-day Liaoning, China)
- Died: 13 September 1984 (aged 41); Tokyo, Japan
- Occupation: Manga artist
- Relatives: Tetsuya Chiba (brother) Ken Chiba (brother) Shigeyuki Chiba (brother)

Akio Chiba (ちばあきお or 千葉 亜喜生, Chiba Akio; 29 January 1943 – 13 September 1984) was a Japanese manga artist.

== Early life ==
On 29 January 1943, Chiba was born in Shenyang, Manchukuo (now part Liaoning, China). His father worked in a paper factory in China. Chiba had three brothers, Tetsuya, Shigeyuki, and Ken. Tetsuya and Shigeyuki were also manga artists.

At the end of the Sino-Japanese War, Chiba's family lived in the attic of a work-acquaintance of his father until they could find a way to get back to Japan.

== Career ==
Chiba was known for publishing his works in both shōnen and shōjo magazines. Chiba made his professional debut in 1967 with his manga Sabu to Chibi while working as an assistant to his older brother, Tetsuya. In 1977, he won the 22nd Shogakukan Manga Award for shōnen for his work on Captain and Play Ball.

== Personal ==
On 13 September 1984, Chiba committed suicide due to issues related to bipolar disorder. He was 41 years old.

== Works ==
Listed chronologically.

- Kōsha Ura no Eleven (February 1971, Bessatsu Shōnen Jump, Shueisha)
- Han-chan (September 1971, Bessatsu Shōnen Jump)
- Michikusa (January 1972, Bessatsu Shōnen Sunday)
- Captain (26 volumes, 1972–1979, Bessatsu Shōnen Jump, made into an anime series in 1980)
- Play Ball (22 volumes, 1973–1978, Weekly Shōnen Jump)
- Fushigi Tōbo-kun (1982–1983, Monthly Shōnen Jump, written by Tarō Nami)
- Champ (April–November 1984, Monthly Shōnen Jump, written by Tarō Nami)
  - This was his last work.

== See also ==
- List of manga artists
- Tetsuya Chiba
