= Super Jetter =

Japanese anime television series

未来からきた少年 スーパージェッター (Mirai Kara Kita Shōnen Sūpā Jettā)
- Manga
- Written by: Fumio Hisamatsu
- Published by: Shogakukan
- Magazine: Weekly Shōnen Sunday
- Original run: 1965 – 1966
- Anime television series
- Directed by: Haruyuki Kawajima
- Produced by: Toshimichi Miwa
- Written by: Yasutaka Tsutsui; Masao Yamamura; Taku Mayumura; Masaki Tsuji (Masaki Katsura); Ryo Hanmura; Aritsune Toyota; Ichirō Kanō
- Music by: Takeo Yamashita
- Studio: TCJ
- Original network: TBS
- Original run: January 7, 1965 – January 20, 1966
- Episodes: 52

Super Jetter (未来からきた少年スーパージェッター, Mirai Kara Kita Shōnen Sūpā Jettā; lit. The Boy from the Future Super Jetter) is a Japanese monochrome anime television series created by Fumio Hisamatsu, who also served as the series character designer. When the series was broadcast in other countries, some episodes were redone in color, and the Japanese rebroadcasts use these color episodes.

== Plot ==
Super Jetter comes from the 30th century, but after fighting the villain known as "Jaguar" he ends up in a time machine that sends them back to the 20th century. He meets a young girl named Kaoru whose father is the Secretary of International Science Bureau of Investigation, Saigou Mizushima. With his super abilities, Jetter is asked by Mr. Mizushima to help keep peace in the 20th century. Jetter has superior intelligence and strength compared to those of the 20th century. He has futuristic abilities such as being able to stop time for 30 seconds, an anti-gravity belt, infrared goggles, is bulletproof, and has a paralyzing gun.

== Characters ==
- Jetter (Voiced by: Osamu Ichikawa)
- Kaoru Mizushima (Voiced by: Minori Matsushima)
- Jaguar (Voiced by: Kei Taguchi)
- Saigou Mizushima (Voiced by: Kazuo Kumakura)
- Spider (Voiced by: Tadashi Nakamura)

== Release ==
The fourth volume of "Aiken TV Anime Graffiti" contained the 41st episode. There was a short-lived VHS release that was only two VHS and contained three of the color episodes. A 13 disc Laser-disc release was released in 1993. A complete DVD version was released in 2002.
