= Mari Okamoto =

Japanese actress and voice actress (born 1954)

- 岡本 茉利
- Born: October 31, 1954 (age 72); Tokyo, Japan
- Occupations: Actress; voice actress
- Years active: 1961–present

Mari Okamoto (岡本 茉利, Okamoto Mari; born October 31, 1954) is a Japanese actress and voice actress.

== Biography ==
Despite being born in Tokyo, Okamoto was actually raised in Hirakata, Osaka, where she also spent her elementary school years. In 1961, she made her debut for performing arts activities in comedy. In 1970, she moved back to Tokyo, with subsequent transfer to the headquarters of the city, where she changed her name from "Noda Mutsumi" to her current name. In 1971, she starred in the comedy film Tora-san's Love Call, as an extra.

In 1970, she had made her voice-acting debut in the anime series Inakappe Taishō, where she voiced Kikuko Ogaki. Her first major performances were in the anime television series is Yatterman. From the 1970s to the 1980s, she appeared in many anime works produced by Tatsunoko Production.

== Filmography ==
=== Anime television ===
- Inakappe Taishō (1970) – Kikuko Ogaki
- Demetan Croaker, The Boy Frog (1973) – Ranatan
- Neo-Human Casshern (1973) – Flora, Morena
- The Song of Tentomushi (1974) – Tsukimi Isshu
- Vicky the Viking (1974) – Tilde
- Dog of Flanders (1975) – Annie
- Time Bokan (1975) – Junko
- Paul's Miraculous Adventure (1976) – Laura
- Yatterman (1977) – Ai/Yatterman-2
- Gatchaman II (1978) – Lisa
- Space Battleship Yamato II (1978) – Teresa
- Tōshō Daimos (1978) – Reiko
- Hana no Ko Lunlun (1979) – Lunlun
- The Rose of Versailles (1979) – Dianne
- Maeterlinck's Blue Bird: Tyltyl and Mytyl's Adventurous Journey (1980) – Sprit of the Light
- Ohayō! Spank (1981) – Aiko Morimura
- The Three Musketeers (1987) – Queen Anne
- City Hunter: .357 Magnum (1989) – Nina Shutenberg
- Otoko wa Tsurai yo (Anime series) (1998) – Sakura Suwa
- Tegami Bachi (2009) – Louisa
- Little Witch Academia (2017) – Professor Lukic
- BanG Dream! (2017) – Mami Ichigaya

=== Anime films ===
- The Wizard of Oz (1982) – Dorothy Gale

=== Live-action films ===
- Karafuto 1945 Summer Hyosetsu no Mon (1974) – Tomoko Katori
- Kigeki: Onna uridashimasu (xxxx) – Asako
- Tora's Pure Love (1976) – Sayuri Ōzora
- The Yellow Handkerchief (1977) – Ramen shop girl
- Nomugi Pass (1979) – Ei Kubo

=== Television drama ===
- Seigi no Shinboru Kondoruman (1975) – Sayuri Terada
- Hanekonma (1986)
- Hana no Ran (1994) – Chigusa

=== Video games ===
- Bokan Desu yo (1998) – Yatterman-2
- Majokko Daisakusen: Little Witching Mischiefs (1999) – Lunlun
- Bokan GoGoGo (2001) – Junko, Yatterman-2

=== Dubbing ===
- The Big Boss (1978 TV Asahi edition) – Chiao Mei (Maria Yi)
- Death Ship (1983 Fuji TV edition) – Lori (Victoria Burgoyne)
- Fist of Fury (1985 TBS edition) – Yuan Li'er (Nora Miao)
- Live and Let Die (1981 TBS edition) – Solitaire (Jane Seymour)
- The Magnificent Seven (1974 TV Asahi edition) – Petra (Rosenda Monteros)
- Suspiria (1977) (1979 TBS edition) – Suzy Bannion (Jessica Harper)
- Suspiria (2018) – Anke Meier (Jessica Harper)
- Way of the Dragon – Chen Ching-hua (Nora Miao)
- The Wizard of Oz (1974 TBS edition) – Dorothy Gale (Judy Garland)
