= Sennin Buraku =

Manga series by Kō Kojima

- Sennin Buraku comic strip by Kō Kojima

仙人部落
- Genre: Romantic comedy, satire, sex comedy
- Manga
- Written by: Kō Kojima
- Published by: Tokuma Shoten
- Magazine: Weekly Asahi Geinō
- Original run: October 1956 – August 2014
- Live-action film

Fūryū Kokkei-tan: Sennin Buraku
- Directed by: Morihei Magatani
- Studio: Shintoho
- Released: February 28, 1961
- Runtime: 83 minutes
- Anime television series
- Directed by: Shigeharu Kaneko
- Studio: Tele-Cartoon Japan
- Original network: Fuji TV
- Original run: September 4, 1963 – February 23, 1964
- Episodes: 23

Sennin Buraku (仙人部落; roughly Hermit Village) is a manga series by Kō Kojima which ran in the adult magazine Weekly Asahi Geinō, published by Tokuma Shoten in Japan. It is the longest running comic with only one artist, being published weekly since October 1956, and the longest-running strip ever in Japan. By contrast, Golgo 13 is the longest running manga to be serialized in a dedicated manga magazine with Doraemon the second longest, and Kochira Katsushika-ku Kameari Kōen-mae Hashutsujo (Kochi-Kame) the third longest (Asahi Geino is not a dedicated manga magazine). While Sennin Buraku has been running for more years than Peanuts, Charles M. Schulz's strip has more "episodes" as it ran daily rather than weekly. The story was a romantic comedy taking place in historical China, and it was quite risqué for its time. The characters were very traditionally dressed (e.g. all wearing hanfu). The anime has been rerun on Japanese television, and all episodes have appeared on DVD (save for episodes 12 and 19).

Sennin Buraku was the first late night anime, broadcast shortly before midnight on Fuji TV from September 4, 1963, to February 23, 1964. This was the first anime series produced by Tele-Cartoon Japan, and a page exists on their website about it. The series was in black and white and ran for 23 episodes. A live action movie was released in 1961, titled Fūryū Kokkei-tan: Sennin Buraku (風流滑稽譚 仙人部落).

With the August 7, 2014 issue, it was announced that the series would be placed on hiatus. The death of the artist on April 14, 2015, puts any future chapters of Sennin Buraku in doubt.

== Plot summary ==
Sennin Buraku takes place in Taoyuan, a small Edo period village, populated solely by Taoist ascetics. The eldest, Lao Shi, conducts research into magic and alchemy, while his disciple Zhi Huang remains more interested in pleasures of the flesh. He has fallen for three pretty sisters who live nearby, much to Lao Shi's annoyance.

== Manga ==
While the manga has run in Weekly Asahi Geinō for over fifty years, there have been no translations of it.

== Live action movie ==
The 83-minute live action movie was titled Fūryū Kokkei-tan: Sennin Buraku, and was released in theaters by Shintoho on 1961-02-08.

=== Cast ===
- Akiko Matsuyama: Mayumi Ōzora
- Tenpei Naiki: Yōichi Numata
- Yōko Kondō: Mako Sanjō
- Doctor: Bokuzen Hidari
- Laundry boy: Akihiro Maruyama
- Daikichi Narayama: Bunta Sugawara

=== Staff ===
- Director: Morihei Magatani
- Planning: Mitsuo Nakatsuka
- Screenplay: Isao Matsumoto
- Cinematographer: Shigenobu Yoshida
- Art Director: Haruyasu Kurosawa
- Music: Keitarō Miho

== Anime series ==
Each episode of the anime series was 15 minutes long. The first eight episodes were broadcast from 23:40 to 23:55 on Wednesday nights on Fuji TV following the world news, and episodes nine through 23 were broadcast from 23:30 to 23:45 on Sunday nights.

The opening theme song, Sennin Buraku no Thema, was sung by Three Graces, arranged by Tōru Kino and the lyrics were written by Takeo Yamashita.

=== Cast ===
- Sennin: Hyakushō San'yūtei
- Ichikawa Danjūrō
- Yoshiaki Hanayagi
- Tomoko Kokai
- Ichirō Nagai

=== Staff ===
- Director: Shigeharu Kaneko
- Screenplay: Akira Hayasaka, Tōru Kino
- Production: TCJ
