= Daina Airan =

- Developer: Game Arts
- Publisher: Game Arts
- Platform: Sega Saturn
- Release: JP: February 14, 1997
- Genre: Digital comic
- Mode: Single-player

Daina Airan (Note: Japanese: だいな あいらん) is a 1997 video game for the Sega Saturn. The game is a digital comic, a video game style with minimal gameplay, where players mostly follow a story and make small choices that send it in different directions. It was done in a similar style to earlier Game Arts titles such as Urusei Yatsura: Dear My Friends (1994) and Yumimi Mix Remix (1996). The game features character design by Izumi Takemoto who had previously worked with Game Arts on Yumimi Mix.

The game received positive reviews from Sega Saturn Magazine, Famitsu and Saturn Fan magazines, which complimented the production values of the game and how it captured the unique style of Takemoto.

== Gameplay ==
Game Arts and game magazines promoted the game as a "digital comic". Digital comic games integrate elements of adventure games such as navigation and conversation gameplay mechanics. Unlike adventure games, players do not solve complicated puzzles and are more likely to encounter occasional time-critical mini-games or quizzes for gameplay.

Daina Airan has very minimal gameplay. Players choose options presented at key points during the game's story to advance. Players can also have the ability to fast-forward and rewind through segments of the story.

== Development ==
Daina Airan was developed and published by Game Arts. The programmer for Daina Airan was Hiroaki Okabe, who had previously worked on earlier digital comic games such as Urusei Yatsura: Dear My Friends (1994) and Yumimi Mix Remix (1996). In an interview with Okabe published in the February 1996 issue of Sega Saturn Magazine, he said the game was far from complete, with only a trailer made.

The character designs were created by manga artist Izumi Takemoto. Due to Takemoto's busier schedule, most of the layout design was completed in-house. Okabe said this led to difficulties in development, as the game had multiple narrative paths; design and layouts had to be consistent throughout.

Daina Airan features the two girls who appear at the end of the game Yumimi Mix Remix (1996).

== Reception ==
Reception

Review scores
Publication	Score
Famitsu	7/10, 5/10, 7/10, 7/10
Saturn Fan	7.4/10
Sega Saturn Magazine	8/10, 7/10, 8/10

Daina Airan was released for the Sega Saturn in Japan on February 14, 1997.

Reviewers in Famitsu and Sega Saturn Magazine commented that the gameplay was very minimal. One reviewer in Famitsu said that the depth in this kind of game was unmatched, with the only drawback being that the tone does not really change at all despite the different options to take the story in other directions. In Saturn Fan magazine, they said players who approach it as a typical adventure game would find the gameplay to be lacking, but said it reached a remarkably high standard for its animation and it perfectly captures Izumi Takemoto's distinct and heartwarming style.

Two reviewers in Famitsu complimented the characters and being cute and well animated. One reviewer in Famitsu and another in Sega Saturn Magazine said the stories were too straightforward, with one reviewer saying that it lacked the unique humor found in Yumimi.

== See also ==
- List of Sega Saturn games
- Video games in Japan
