= Oyako Club =

Japanese anime television series

- Title card, showing the human family and the bright yellow alien father and son.

親子クラブ (Oyako Kurabu)
- Genre: Slice of Life; Science fiction; Comedy
- Anime television series
- Directed by: Shoutarō Murodera
- Produced by: Shoutarō Murodera
- Studio: Eiken
- Original network: Fuji Television
- Original run: October 3, 1994 – March 30, 2013
- Episodes: 1,818
- icon

Oyako Club (Japanese: 親子クラブ, Hepburn: Oyako Kurabu) was a Japanese interstitial anime television series that aired from 3 October 1994 to 30 March 2013 in the Kantō region on Fuji TV in Japan. Each episode was five minutes in length, and a total of 1,818 episodes were aired.

The series follows two aliens who move in with a Japanese family. The aliens are used by the show to teach children about Japanese culture, manners, food, and humor using animation and periodic, brief live-action segments. The series is not well known outside of Japan, and it has been included in multiple "longest running anime" lists and praised for its humor.

== Plot ==
A bright yellow alien father and son come to Earth and begin living with a Japanese family. Humor is used to show them learning new things about life in Japan as well as experiencing cultural misunderstandings. The series was episodic, with no overarching plot outside of the aliens eventually becoming more accustomed to life on Earth.

Each episode presented useful information to young children (such as cooking, manners, everyday life skills, and so on) in a similarly to other Eiken series such as Hoka Hoka Kazoku, Dotanba no Manā, and Kotowaza House. Live-action segments were used in many episodes, especially those about food preparation. Aliens were used to show someone learning something new about life in Japan.

== Characters ==
=== Aliens ===
Ronpapa (ロンパパ)
An alien from outer space. He is lazy and gluttonous, as well as skilled in transformation. Voiced by: Nobuyuki Hikichi.
Run-chan (ルンちゃん)
Ronpapa's son. He is very smart and calls Miyuki "Mama-san". Voiced by: Himawari Hyūga and later Naomi Watanabe.

=== Humans ===
Hana Hanasaki (花咲ハナ, Hanasaki Hana)
Grandma, always wearing an apron, and the brains of the family. She always gives Ronpapa a hard time. Voiced by: Yūko Hisamatsu, and later by Yoshie Yamamoto and Setsuko Yamazaki.
Kihachi Hanasaki (花咲喜八, Hanasaki Kihachi)
The dad, and the son of Hana. He's a businessman whose only redeeming quality is his kindness. Ronpapa calls him by his first name. Voiced by: Kihachirō Uemura.
Miyuki Hanasaki (花咲美幸, Hanasaki Miyuki)
Kihachi's wife. She is an excellent cook, a trait she learned from Grandma Hana. Voiced by: Miyuki Sano.
Ichirō Hanasaki (花咲一郎, Hanasaki Ichirō)
Son of Kihachi and Miyuki. He loves soccer. Voiced by: Megumi Oki.
Yuri Hanasaki (花咲ユリ, Hanasaki Yuri)
Daughter of Kihachi and Miyuki. Idolized by everyone in the family. Voiced by: Yuri Satō.

== Anime ==
Oyako Club created and produced by Eiken, the same studio that produces the long-running series Sazae-san. It aired from 3 October 1994 to 30 March 2013 in the Kantō region on Fuji TV, for a total of 1,818 five-minute episodes (1,667 if you count episodes aired back-to-back as a single, longer episode). It is one of the longest-running televisions series in Japan. The episodes were aired between other longer programs, airing twice a week for five minutes each time. Beginning 3 April 2010, it began airing two episodes back-to-back once a week on Saturdays. These longer episodes had an eyecatch between the episodes and ending credits.

After being digitized in 2004, the series began airing in Hi-Vision in April 2009. Its 1000th episode was aired on 21 March 2005. The final episode was aired on 30 March 2013, and was replaced by Tetsujin 28-go Gao!. Beginning in November 2021, select episodes have been streamed on Eiken's YouTube channel.

Two theme songs were used for the series:

- "Divertimento 93'K.138" (ディヴェルティメント93'K.138, Diverutimento 93'K.138)
- "Practice of play"

Both of the songs were adaptations of stock music, the first a rock arrangement of a Mozart piece and the second a dance club mix.

== Reception ==
Reviews of the series have been generally positive. CBR said that "[a]t only five minutes apiece, Oyako Club gets in and out quickly with its slice-of-life styling with a sci-fi twist", but they were disappointed in its lack of closure by the series' end. HowStuffWorks described it as "little-known by anime fans outside of Japan", but said it was "both amusing and informative (especially if you're a youngster)". The Gamer said the show went beyond just being educational, stating "the show provides plenty of goofy visual gags". FandomWire praised that it offered "an entertaining experience for all ages".
