= Football Hawk =

Japanese manga series

- First tankōbon volume cover

フットボール鷹 (Futtobōru Taka)
- Genre: Sports
- Manga
- Written by: Noboru Kawasaki
- Published by: Kodansha
- Magazine: Weekly Shōnen Magazine
- Original run: January 9, 1977 – April 1, 1979
- Volumes: 10

Football Hawk (Japanese: フットボール鷹, Hepburn: Futtobōru Taka) is a Japanese manga series written and illustrated by Noboru Kawasaki. It was serialized in Kodansha's Weekly Shōnen Magazine from January 1977 to April 1979 and published in ten volumes.

== Media ==
=== Manga ===
Written and illustrated by Noboru Kawasaki, the series began serialization in serialization in Kodansha's manga magazine Weekly Shōnen Magazine on January 9, 1977. It completed its serialization on April 1, 1979. Its individual chapters were collected into ten tankōbon volumes.

==== Volumes ====
No.	Japanese release date	Japanese ISBN
1	July 26, 1978	978-4-06-109483-3
2	July 26, 1978	978-4-06-109484-0
3	August 18, 1978	978-4-06-172516-4
4	September 21, 1978	978-4-06-172520-1
5	October 20, 1978	978-4-06-172526-3
6	December 19, 1978	978-4-06-172551-5
7	January 23, 1979	978-4-06-172560-7
8	February 22, 1979	978-4-06-172566-9
9	March 23, 1979	978-4-06-172571-3
10	April 20, 1979	978-4-06-172578-2

=== Audio drama ===
An audio drama adaptation, with scripts written by Mamoru Sasaki and starring Kinya Aikawa, was released by NHK FM Broadcast. It ran for six episodes from August 14–19, 1977.

== Reception ==
In 1978, the series won the 2nd Kodansha Manga Award in the shōnen manga category.

Mike Toole of Anime News Network felt that the story was not as melodramatic as Ikki Kajiwara's Ashita e Free Kick, but that it was well researched and had good artwork. He concluded that "Football Hawk would be the most successful stab at [American football]'s depiction in manga for quite some time".
