= Skyers 5 =

Japanese anime series

- screenshot from the 1960s anime

スカイヤーズ5
- Genre: Science fiction, action
- Manga
- Written by: Takeshi Ishibashi
- Illustrated by: Noboru Kawasaki
- Published by: Shueisha
- Magazine: Shōnen Book
- Original run: 1966 – 1968
- Anime television series
- Directed by: Haruji Sasaki; Haruyuki Kawajima
- Music by: Ichiro Tsukasa
- Studio: TCJ
- Original network: TBS
- Original run: October 4, 1967 – December 27, 1967
- Episodes: 15 (3 were unaired)
- Anime television series

Shin Skyers 5
- Directed by: Haruji Sasaki; Haruyuki Kawajima
- Music by: Ichiro Tsukasa
- Studio: Eiken
- Original network: TBS
- Original run: October 7, 1971 – March 30, 1972
- Episodes: 39 (13 were unaired)

Skyers 5 (スカイヤーズ5) is a Japanese anime television series produced by Tele-Cartoon Japan. It aired from October to December 1967, with twelve episodes released plus three unaired episodes. A manga adaptation by Takashi Ishibashi and Noboru Kawasaki, who also served as the character designer for both anime series, was also released.

== Plot ==
The Skyers 5 are a secret police group who fight an international crime organization. The series plays out as a mix between science fiction and an old western with frequent shootouts.

== Sequels ==
=== Shin Skyers 5 ===
Second series (October 7, 1971, to March 30, 1972) in color of Skyers 5 composed of 39 episodes (13 of which were never aired) with no changes to characters or general plot storylines.

== Characters ==
- Kyousuke Maki as Captain/S1
- Setsuo Wakui as Polka/S2
- Youko Kuri as Yuri/S3
- Takuzou Kamiyama as Samson/S4
- Shūsei Nakamura as Taro Hayabusa/S5
- Masaoki Takato as Ghost
