= Play Ball (manga) =

Japanese manga series and its adaptation

- Manga volume 1 cover

プレイボール (Purei Bōru)
- Genre: Sports
- Manga
- Written by: Akio Chiba
- Published by: Shueisha
- Imprint: Jump Comics
- Magazine: Weekly Shōnen Jump
- Original run: 1973 – 1978
- Volumes: 22
- Anime television series
- Directed by: Satoshi Dezaki; Setsuko Shibuichi
- Produced by: Yutoku Abe; Hiroyuki Ooizumi; Takashi Mizukami; Hiroyasu Isshiki
- Music by: Kaoru Wada
- Studio: Eiken (production); Magic Bus (animation)
- Original network: Animax
- Original run: July 4, 2005 – March 27, 2006
- Episodes: 26
- Manga

Play Ball 2
- Written by: Yūji Moritaka
- Published by: Shueisha
- Magazine: Grand Jump
- Original run: April 5, 2017 – May 6, 2021
- Volumes: 12

Play Ball (Japanese: プレイボール, Hepburn: Purei Bōru) is a Japanese manga series written and illustrated by Akio Chiba. It was serialized in Shueisha's shōnen manga magazine Weekly Shōnen Jump from 1973 to 1978, with its chapters collected in twenty-two tankōbon volumes.

A sequel, Play Ball 2, illustrated by Yūji Moritaka, was published in Grand Jump from April 5, 2017, to May 6, 2021, and collected into twelve volumes.

The manga was adapted into a two-season anime television series co-produced by Eiken and Magic Bus, which aired on several Japanese television stations as well as the anime satellite television network Animax from July to September 2005 (1st season) and from January to March 2006 (2nd season).

The series was released concurrently with Chiba's other major work, Captain, the other series for which he won the 22nd Shogakukan Manga Award for shōnen in 1977.

== Plot ==
After fracturing a finger in a junior high school game, Takao Taniguchi is unable to play baseball. After entering Sumitani High School, he is constantly watching the baseball club even though he is unable to play. He catches the eye of the captain of the soccer club, and while he still has lingering hopes of joining the baseball club, he decides to join the soccer club. While he's a complete beginner, Taniguchi developed a strong spirit of hard work while in junior high school and his new teammates begin to see his potential. While he focuses all of his energy on soccer, he is unable to forget his youthful zeal for baseball and he begins umpiring baseball games in secret.

After someone leaks his secret to the captain of the soccer team, the captain becomes angry at him and Taniguchi decides that soccer is not really for him. At the recommendation of the captain, he resigns from the soccer club and joins the baseball club. The Sumitani baseball club would lose their big game every year due to the inexperience of the club members. After Taniguchi joined, however, the club begins to change for the better.

== Characters ==
Takao Taniguchi
Voiced by: Kenichirō Maeda
Pitcher (right-handed) and third baseman. He injured his finger in an accident when he was in junior high, and causing him to give up pitching because he thought it was too hard to pitch with a finger which caused him to be unable to pitch straight. However, through a great deal of effort and hard work, Taniguchi was able to overcome this and master the forkball (in the anime, his right index finger is crooked). After that, he had surgery to fix the injury to his finger (the anime has the order of events a bit different than in the manga).
Tadakoro
Voiced by: Yutaka Kōno
Plays catcher. Was the captain of the baseball club when Taniguchi joined.
Yutaka Kurabayashi
Voiced by: Satoshi Hino
Plays catcher after Tadakoro. Usually bats third.
Nakayama
Voiced by: Yoshitaka Kuremoto
Plays pitcher (left-handed) and third baseman. One year older than Taniguchi, and wears glasses.
Ōta
Voiced by: Shinsuke Fukui
Plays shortstop, and can run 100 m in 12 seconds. One year older than Taniguchi.
Yamaguchi
Voiced by: Norihiko Nanda
One year older than Taniguchi. Known for having a huge mole.
Yamamoto
Voiced by: Takashi Senda
One year older than Taniguchi. Plays right fielder, first baseman, and is a right-handed relief pitcher. Has an overbite.
Marui
Voiced by: Yū Asano
One year younger than Taniguchi. Plays second baseman.
Yokoi
Voiced by: Kōichi Shibasaki
Same age as Taniguchi. Plays second baseman, switches to shortstop in the second year, and third baseman in the third year.
Handa
Voiced by: Kyōhei Tanaka
Same age as Taniguchi. Plays right fielder.
Tomuro
Voiced by: Akira Kubota
Same age as Taniguchi. Plays left fielder.
Suzuki
Voiced by: Ōki Sugiyama
Same age as Taniguchi. Plays right fielder. Joined the baseball club at the same time as Handa.
Matsugawa
Voiced by: Kenji Iwama
One year younger than Taniguchi. Plays third baseman.
Shimada
Voiced by: Ryūta Anzai
One year younger than Taniguchi. Plays center fielder.
Katō
Voiced by: Naoto Seki
One year younger than Taniguchi. Left-handed.

== Anime ==
=== DVD releases ===
First season

- Volume 1, AVBA-22361, ¥2940
- Volume 2, AVBA-22362, ¥5040
- Volume 3, AVBA-22363, ¥5040
- Volume 4, AVBA-22364, ¥5040
- Volume 5, AVBA-22365, ¥5040
- Volume 6, AVBA-22366, ¥5040
- Volume 7, AVBA-22367, ¥5040

Second season

- Volume 1, AVBA-22701, ¥5040
- Volume 2, AVBA-22702, ¥5040
- Volume 3, AVBA-22703, ¥5040
- Volume 4, AVBA-22704, ¥5040, July 26, 2006
- Volume 5, AVBA-22705, ¥5040, August 30, 2006
