= Yūsei Kamen =

Japanese anime television series

Yūsei Kamen (Japanese: 遊星仮面, lit. Planetary Mask), is a sci-fi superhero anime series produced by TCJ (now Eiken) from June 3, 1966, to February 21, 1967. It consisted of 39 episodes. At the same time, a manga by the character designer, Takaharu Kusunoki, was published under Shōnen Book (Shueisha).

== Characters ==
Peter/Planet Mask

Voiced by: Yoshiko Fujita

The main character of this story, he was born to Earthling Robert and Pineronian Maria, After Robert's death and Maria's incarceration, he is taken in by Professor Socraton and secretly acts as Planet Mask. He always carries the bag he received from Atlanta, which contains the Planet Mask suit.

Professor Socraton

Voiced by: Kazuo Harada

A scientist on earth that has adopted Peter and Linda

Linda

Voiced by: Yoko Kuri

Professor Socraton's granddaughter

Dr. Imosi

Voiced by: Ryūji Saikachi

Hyugens

Voiced by: Gorō Naya

Dictator of the Planet Pineron, and holds military power of the planet.
