= Apocalypse Hotel =

Japanese anime television series

- Key visual

アポカリプスホテル (Apokaripusu Hoteru)
- Genre: Post-apocalyptic
- Created by: CyberAgent; CygamesPictures
- Anime television series
- Directed by: Kana Shundo
- Produced by: Manami Kabashima; Ryou Ebina; Atsushi Kimura; Kouichi Sano; Naofumi Shioya
- Written by: Shigeru Murakoshi
- Music by: Yoshiaki Fujisawa
- Studio: CygamesPictures
- Licensed by: Crunchyroll
- Original network: Nippon TV, AT-X, MBS
- Original run: April 9, 2025 – June 25, 2025
- Episodes: 12
- Manga

Apocalypse Hotel Pusupusu
- Illustrated by: Izumi Takemoto
- Published by: Takeshobo
- Magazine: Storia Dash
- Original run: April 11, 2025 – June 27, 2025
- Volumes: 1
- Manga

Apocalypse Hotel Karikari
- Illustrated by: Izumi Takemoto
- Published by: Takeshobo
- Magazine: Takecomic
- Original run: December 25, 2025 – June 11, 2026
- Volumes: 1
- icon

Apocalypse Hotel (Japanese: アポカリプスホテル, Hepburn: Apokaripusu Hoteru) is an original Japanese anime television series produced by CyberAgent and animated by CygamesPictures. The series aired from April to June 2025.

== Plot ==
In the year 2057, an unknown aerial contagion dubbed "infortunium pollution" begins to spread around Earth, rendering the air unbreathable to primate-based species, including humans. With no way to cure or counter the infortunium pollution, humanity has no choice but to flee to space, leaving the planet completely abandoned. A century later, the only sign of civilization left is the Gingarou Hotel in Ginza, which is kept operational by what remains of the autonomous robot staff led by the gynoid concierge Yachiyo. As the staff wait patiently for humanity to return, they are caught off guard when their first guest to arrive in a century turns out to be an extraterrestrial visitor.

Later a family of tanuki aliens visit the hotel after fleeing their home planet due to a war. This family end up living on Earth in their converted space ship, and one of the tanuki, Ponko, becomes an employee at the hotel. The tanuki have long lifespans, and together with Yachiyo, they work together to improve the hotel and attract more alien visitors over the course of several centuries, but still waiting for humanity's return. These improvements including building a hot spring spa, constructing a distillery to make their own whisky, and promoting the hotel by launching adverts in space.

Eventually, a human named Tomari Iori visits Earth, having been raised on a spaceship. She and the hotel staff discover that the infortunium pollution is no longer deadly to humans, thanks to a special plant left at the hotel by the first extraterrestrial visitor. However, humans have been in space for so long that their bodies now have an allergy to Earth's atmosphere, and thus can only visit the planet for short periods of time. Tomari leaves Earth, promising to Yachiyo that more humans will come and visit in time, leading to Yachiyo and her staff to continue running the hotel after Tomari leaves.

== Characters ==
Yachiyo (ヤチヨ)
Voiced by: Saho Shirasu
A gynoid who serves as the manager of the Gingarou Hotel. She and the other robots needs to recharge every now and then. Though usually calm and polite, she can be quite temperamental if anyone wreaks havoc in the hotel. At one point, it is discovered that she has a delinquent persona. She is technically the only gynoid who is still active on Earth. She is good friends with Ponko, who now runs the hotel with her.
Ponko (ポン子)
Voiced by: Sumire Morohoshi
A young alien tanuki called a Procione who has a close relationship with Yachiyo. She and her family currently work in the Gingarou Hotel. Along with her family, she can change between her human form and her true tanuki form. Because of how sensitive they are, they faint and return to their true forms when in shock. It should also be noted that they age much slower than humans do. She becomes the hotel's new manager following Yachiyo's temporary absence. Once Yachiyo returns, she now works alongside her. Upon reaching adulthood, she marries Ponstin and has a daughter named Tamako.
Doorman Robot (ドアマンロボ, Doaman Robo)
Voiced by: Hiroki Tōchi
A large robot whose job is to open and close the hotel's front doors. He's known to be a bit stubborn with his job, which causes him to overheat.
Environment Checker Robot (環境チェックロボ, Kankyō Chekku Robo)
Voiced by: Shin-ichiro Miki
A robot designed to observe Earth's condition to see if it is habitable again. He can send messages to humanity in space, but never receives answers. Besides observing, he can also deploy a laser to shoot down threats. So far, he is the last of his kind. This last remaining robot is currently staying in the Gingarou Hotel.
The Owner (オーナー, Ōnā)
Voiced by: Hiroyuki Kinoshita
The original unnamed owner of the Gingarou Hotel. He left Earth years ago along with the other humans. It can be presumed that he has passed away prior to the story's events.
Bumbuku (ブンブク, Bunbuku)
Voiced by: Chō
A Procione who came to Earth with his family to escape a war. He currently works in the Gingarou Hotel. He is Ponko and Fuguri's father.
Mami (マミ)
Voiced by: Takako Honda
A Procione who came to Earth with her family to escape a war. She currently works in the Gingarou Hotel. She is Ponko and Fuguri's mother.
Fuguri (フグリ)
Voiced by: Mutsumi Tamura
A Procione who came to Earth with his family to escape a war. He currently works in the Gingarou Hotel. He is Ponko's brother, and Bumbuku and Mami's son.
Mujina (ムジナ)
Voiced by: Yoshiko Sakakibara
A Procione who came to Earth with her family to escape a war. She currently works in the Gingarou Hotel. She is Ponko and Fuguri's grandmother. Halfway though the story, she passes away, with her funeral being held at the same ceremony as Ponko and Ponstin's wedding.
Ponstin (ポンスティン, Ponsutin)
Voiced by: Natsuki Hanae
A Procione whom Ponko marries and has a daughter named Tamako.
Tamako (タマ子)
Voiced by: Hina Kino
Ponko and Ponstin's daughter, who helps them run the hotel.
Gentle Alien (温和宇宙人, Onwa Uchūbito)
Voiced by: Takahide Adachi
An unnamed alien who has a calm personality.
Aggressive Alien (強面宇宙人, Kowamote Uchūbito)
Voiced by: Kenjirō Tsuda
An unnamed alien who has an aggressive personality.
Tamako Iori (タマ子)
Voiced by: Hina Kino
A human girl who came to Earth centuries later following humanity's departure. Although the virus is gone, she discovers that humans have since become allergic to Earth's atmosphere and can no longer survive on it for long periods or outside their spacesuits, so she decides to leave and return later with more humans for a visit.
Flycatcher Robot
A robot who catches insects who enters the hotel as well as clean up scam.
Cleaner Robot A
A robot who cleans the hotel.
Cleaner Robot B
A robot who cleans the hotel.
Cook Robot
A robot who cooks the hotel's meals.
Bartender Robot
A robot who runs the hotel's bar.
Gardener Robot
A robot who tends the hotel's gardens.
Porter Robot
A robot who carries the guests' belongings.
Maintenance Robot
A robot who does maintenance around the hotel.
Driller Robot
One of the robots who works at the Gingarou Hotel, which was damaged beyond repair. It is unknown what it does.
Nudel
Monstrous worms that are known to destroy planets. Several appear on Earth, but they are all killed by Harmaggeddon. Their corpses are used as food supplies for the hotel.
Harmaggeddon
An alien who pilots a robotic suit and is known to destroy civilizations. He attempts to destroy human civilization on Earth, but instead decided to stay on Earth for a while after learning that humanity is long gone and their civilization has collapsed, leaving him with nothing to destroy. Even without his suit, he is a strong fighter. It is implied that he may have feelings for Yachiyo.
Dr. Becrux, Captain Avior, and Mighty Cuff
A group of four alien heroes (the last hero's name is unknown) who tried to slay Harmaggeddon in retribution for the civilizations that he destroyed, but he is too powerful and they are seemly killed.
Sneakity Sneak
A terrorist alien who took refuge in the Gingarou Hotel, assuming the alias Slurpity Slurp. He died of unknown circumstances.
Squirtity Squirt
An alien detective who is hunting Sneakity Sneak. He and Sneakity Sneak are from the same species. Like Sneakity Sneak, he died of unknown cause.

== Production ==
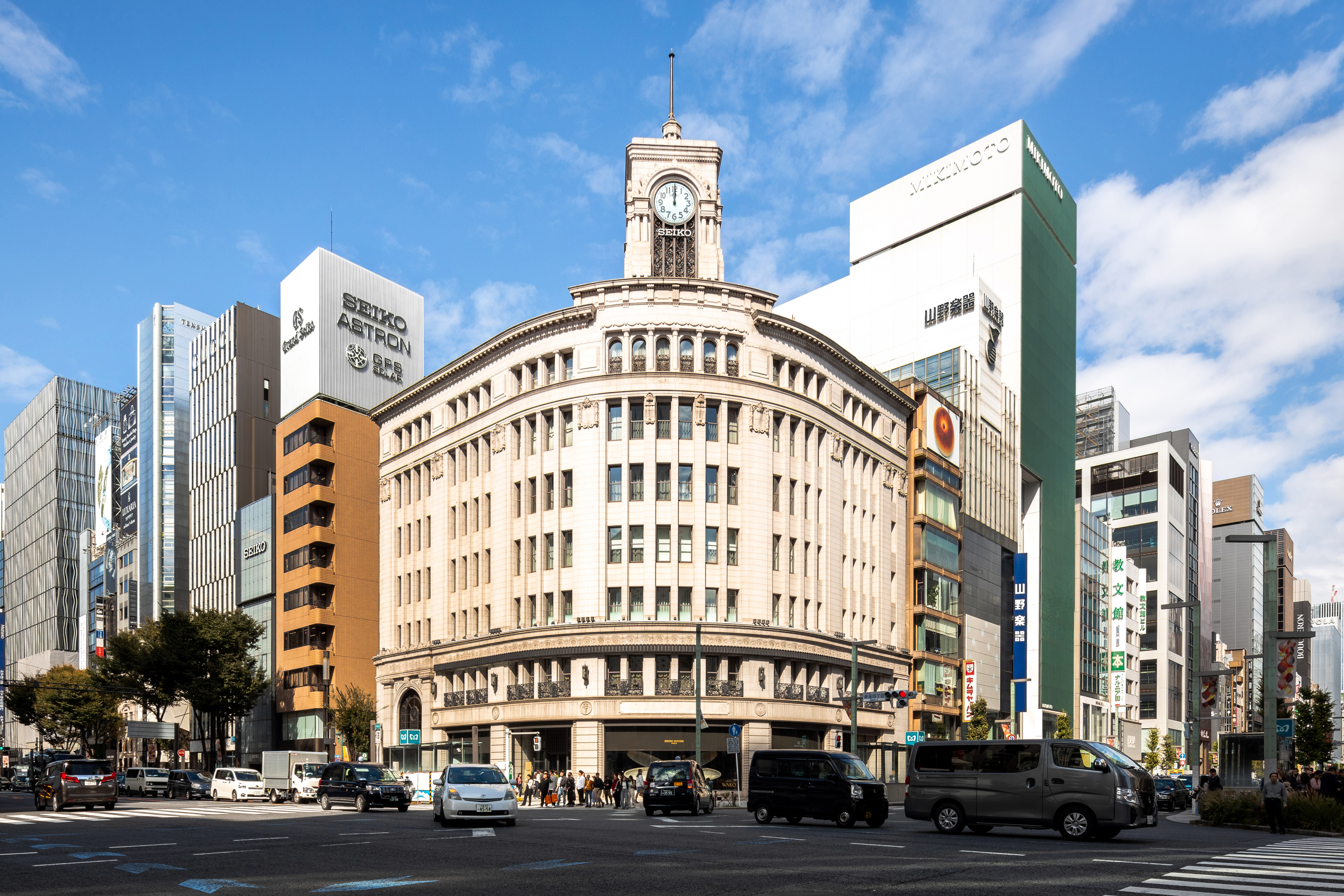
The Gingarou Hotel was modeled after the real Ginza Wako

In 2020, Nobuhiro Takenaka, president of CygamesPictures, approached screenwriter Shigeru Murakoshi and told him that he wanted to make an anime about "an extraterrestrial life form coming to a hotel run by robots on an Earth where humanity has disappeared". Murakoshi wrote an initial script based on this concept and came up with events that he thought would be interesting. He consulted with Sotaro Wada, who oversaw each episode script, and director Kana Shundo to receive their ideas and opinions. Shundo joined the project because of the concept and the original character designs by Izumi Takemoto. After reading a summary of the 12 episodes, she thought that the story was well-written and interesting. Shundo considered the character designs "nostalgic but not outdated".

Takenaka was involved in the anime's production from the early stages and became production manager. He gave suggestions about the beginning and end of the story and came up with random ideas in scenario meetings. Takenaka described his own role as a "jokester". Although the story takes place in a post-apocalyptic world, Takenaka aimed to create an entertaining anime and wanted it to be interpreted by viewers as both sad and funny. In the early stages of production, Yachiyo was originally designed as an "emotionless" robot character who "made calm decisions". However, after researching advances in artificial intelligence and robots, the production team decided to make her thought patterns more human-like. Takenaka suggested adding "an unknown expansion function" to the character to make her more appealing. Shundo tried to envision Yachiyo not as a "moe character" but as a "working woman".

Some scenes and characters were inspired by other popular films. The space scene in episode 7 was influenced by Gravity, Ponko's armored suit in episode 8 was inspired by Aliens, the scene in episode 10 where a door is broken with an axe references The Shining, and the corpse-hiding subplot in the same episode draws from The Trouble with Harry. Environment Checker Robot was created based on inspiration from TARS in Interstellar. The reason Ginza was chosen as the location for the Gingarou Hotel is that the area has traditions dating back to the Edo period, reflects Western cultural influences, and is located near Tokyo Bay. Thus, the production team also wanted to depict that, after the apocalypse, the sea level had risen. When they first created the story's scenario, a clock tower was considered as the hotel's location. For the "Ginza-ness," a symbolic building of Ginza was chosen as the hotel building, and the front of the Kabuki-za Theater was chosen as the hotel's onsen. The Ginza Wako department store was used as a model for the hotel.

== Media ==
=== Anime ===
The original anime television series produced by CyberAgent and animated by CygamesPictures was announced on August 28, 2024. It is directed by Kana Shundo with series composition by Shigeru Murakoshi, with Natsuki Yokoyama designing the characters based on Izumi Takemoto's original designs, and Yoshiaki Fujisawa composing the music. The series aired from April 9 to June 25, 2025, on Nippon TV's AnichU programming block and other networks. (Note: Nippon TV lists the series premiere on April 8, 2025, at 25:34, which is effectively April 9 at 1:34 a.m. JST.) The opening theme song is "Skirt", while the ending theme song is "Capsule" (カプセル), both performed by Aiko. Crunchyroll is streaming the series.

==== Episodes ====
No.	Title	Directed by (Note: Production staff information is taken from the ending credits of each episode.)	Written by	Storyboarded by	Original release date
1	"A True Hotel Is Always Storied"; Transliteration: "Hoteru ni Monogatari o" (Japanese: ホテルに物語を)	Liao Chengzhi	Shigeru Murakoshi	Kana Shundo	April 9, 2025
In the 2057, an unknown phenomenon called "infortunium pollution", which only affects primates, renders Earth's air unbreathable to humans and forces humanity to flee the planet for space. One century later, nature has reclaimed most of human civilization save for the Gingarou Hotel, which is still kept operational thanks to its fully robotic workforce who continue to follow their programming with the belief humans will eventually return. They haven't had guests for years. The acting manager of the robots, Yachiyo, directs the remaining robots. When Doorman Robot overheats, she pours water on him to cool him down, but also warns him about overstressing himself, which he dismisses. While doing a roll call with the hotel's robotic staff, she discovers that Driller Robot is missing. She later finds that Driller Robot has been irreparably damaged, so she puts it on "indefinite leave" with the other inoperable robots. While charging, she recalls the hotel's owner assuring the robots the evacuation is only temporary and that he will return. The next day, Yachiyo falls into a depressed state upon finding out the hotel has a shortage of shampoo hats, with Doorman Robot wearing the last one due to Yachiyo splashing water and him whenever he overheats. Yachiyo becomes devastated by this. However, an alien being then arrives at the hotel, which the robots greet as a guest, though Yachiyo at first thinks it is the hotel's owner.
2	"Tradition Evolves With Innovation and Experimentation"; Transliteration: "Dentou ni Kakushin to Asobigokoro o" (Japanese: 伝統に革新と遊び心を)	Shinya Kawabe	Shigeru Murakoshi	Naoya Morotomi	April 16, 2025
Yachiyo greets the alien guest, but has trouble communicating with it due to their language barrier. Despite this, Yachiyo and the staff resolve to show their utmost hospitality to the alien guest. Over the next three days, the alien appears to collect plant samples from the surrounding area, but Yachiyo and the staff are unsure if it is actually enjoying its stay. A new robot, Environmental Checker Robot, arrives at the hotel, amazed that the hotel is the only place on Earth that's still thriving and explains that it is the last of its type left behind by humanity to observe Earth's conditions to see if it becomes habitable again. It detected the arrival of the alien and offers to destroy it, only relenting when Yachiyo insists it is a guest of the hotel, though it is still wary of the alien. Deciding to stay in the hotel for a while, Environmental Checker Robot then reveals that despite the messages it sends to space, humanity has not answered for the past few decades, suggesting they are extinct. Yachiyo falls back into a depressive state upon hearing this until she recalls advice the hotel owner gave to her, to not get hung up on probabilities but believe in possibilities. The alien then leaves the hotel, gifting Yachiyo a strange alien seed. When the alien has no money to pay for the services, Yachiyo provides him with Earth's money to use as payment before the alien departs.
3	"A Smile is the Ultimate Ambiance"; Transliteration: "Egao wa Saikō no Interia" (Japanese: 笑顔は最高のインテリア)	Akihisa Shibata & Yasuhira Kido	Shigeru Murakoshi	Iku Suzuki	April 23, 2025
Fifty years after the first alien guest left, Yachiyo is overjoyed to see another alien ship crash land in Ginza. The occupants are the Procione family, who claim they are human, but are in fact intelligent tanuki taking on the guise of humans. Yachiyo, believing they are humans, welcomes them as guests until Environment Checker Robot, who is wary of them, activates his combat mode after the children annoy him and causes the entire family to faint in fright, exposing their true forms. The Prociones explain that they were forced to flee their home planet due to a war, and Earth's climate is a close match. They learned about Earth, humans, and their language thanks to them coming across a human ship, but don't have the heart to tell Yachiyo that it was a ghost ship. Yachiyo allows the Prociones to stay in the hotel until their ship can be fixed, but they quickly take advantage of her kindness to do as they please, causing significant property damage. Yachiyo finally loses her temper and harshly reprimands them for their disrespect towards the hotel. Afterwards, the Prociones decide to clean up the mess they made, while the daughter Ponko decides she wants to become an employee for the hotel.
4	"Food and Etiquette are Mainstays of Culture"; Transliteration: "Shoku to Reigi ni Bunka Ari" (Japanese: 食と礼儀に文化あり)	Xu Chuanfeng	Soutarou Wada	Kana Shundo	April 30, 2025
The Prociones soon begin to grow tired of the hotel menu, which has remained static due to the limited availability of ingredients. Determined to keep her guests happy, Yachiyo decides to procure new ingredients from outside the hotel so that they can create new recipes. She takes Ponko with her out into the wilderness to fish, but they are attacked by a giant alien worm. Environment Checker Robot, who detected it earlier, rescues Yachiyo and Ponko and they take shelter in a nearby building, where Ponko explains the worm is a Nudel, an invasive alien creature that destroys whatever planet it lands on. Unwilling to let Earth be destroyed, the trio decide to destroy the Nudel, but its skin is too tough for Environment Checker's cannon to penetrate. Instead, Yachiyo uses a construction crane to "fish" the Nudel using Ponko as bait, impaling its head with the crane hook and killing it (though the plan almost falls apart after Yachiyo runs out of power, which is resolved by a spare battery that they brought). Yachiyo and Ponko then harvest the Nudel for meat and serve it to Prociones, who declare it is delicious.
5	"Provide Unlimited Hospitality In Limited Time"; Transliteration: "Kagiriaru Jikan ni Oshiminai Sabisu o" (Japanese: 限りある時間に惜しみないサービスを)	Fumiaki Kataoka	Soutarou Wada	Fumiaki Kataoka	May 7, 2025
Two new alien guests (who resemble slimes) arrive at the hotel, following the recommendation of the first alien guest that had stayed there. While the new guests enjoy their time at the hotel, they consume the last of the stored alcohol before leaving. Yachiyo has the idea of producing whiskey for the hotel to fulfill one of the owner's dreams, but she explains to the Prociones that due a shortage of labor, she cannot making whiskey until the hotel's hot spring is completed. Ponko convinces her family to help make the whiskey so they can get a new alcohol supply. They manage to restore a nearby distillery and begin creating whiskey, though they go through numerous iterations of trial and error in order to get the flavor correct. Fifteen years later, the whiskey is finally complete. One of the alien guests returns, and she laments that she broke up with her partner. Yachiyo reassures her that people are always changing with time just like whiskey, and the alien guest deduces that Yachiyo is waiting for somebody as well.
6	"Our Only Vice is Service"; Transliteration: "Omotenashi ni wa Uramonashi" (Japanese: おもてなしにはうらもなし)	Migmi	Shigeru Murakoshi	Yutaka Uemura	May 14, 2025
After a century of staying at the hotel, the Prociones have given up on repairing their spaceship and instead use its parts to build a new home nearby. Suddenly, an alien named Harmaggeddon (whom the Prociones know of), who operates a robotic suit, lands on the planet and ambushes the Prociones, intending to destroy human civilization, but is left confused when Yachiyo informs him that humanity has already abandoned the planet. With no clear purpose now, Harmaggeddon decides to stay at the hotel as a guest. During his stay, Harmaggeddon eliminates Earth's Nudel infestation to use as a food source for the hotel and explores the ruins around Earth to learn more about humans, while Ponko mistakenly believes he and Yachiyo have romantic feelings for each other. One night, though, a team of alien heroes arrive to bring Harmaggeddon to justice for all of the civilizations he has destroyed. Realizing that the collateral damage might destroy the hotel, Harmaggeddon swiftly defeats the heroes. As Yachiyo treats his wounds, Harmaggeddon expresses confusion at why she is so adamant about serving him. Yachiyo then asks him why he destroys civilizations, and he answers that he does so before they have a chance at destroying themselves. Eventually, Harmaggeddon decides to check out since the longer he stays, the more likely his enemies will track him down. After bidding farewell, Harmaggeddon leaves one last gift by blasting open a hot spring the staff were trying to drill, remarking that he will gladly return once Yachiyo builds a civilization worth destroying.
7	"Bow Down Deep But Always Aim High"; Transliteration: "Ojigi wa Fukaku, Kokorozashi wa Takaku" (Japanese: お辞儀は深く 志は高く)	Ippei Ichii	Soutarou Wada	Shouji Saeki	May 21, 2025
With no new guests arriving, Yachiyo and the Prociones resort to performing occult rituals in an attempt to summon more guests. Eventually, Yachiyo gets the idea of launching a satellite into the space in order to better advertise the hotel. Upon hearing this, Ponko also wants to launch and Rods from God armed satellite to protect the hotel from potential invaders. Yachiyo is at first adamant that the hotel not build a Rods from God satellite while Environment Checker Robot proposes another solution, but Ponko insists, explaining that she already had to flee her home planet and doesn't want to be forced to run away from Earth and the hotel. Yachiyo is convinced to change her mind after witnessing Ponko's determination, and everybody starts work on building a rocket to carry Ponko and both satellites into space. However, Ponko runs into an issue where the rocket is too heavy to make it into space, so Yachiyo suggest she take Ponko's place so that they can remove the life support systems to save weight. Ponko reluctantly agrees and the rocket is built 70 years later. The launch is successful and Yachiyo manages to deploy the satellites, but is hit by a solar flare which temporarily disables her and strands her in space.
8	"Discipline with a Fist! Reconcile with a High Five!"; Transliteration: "Oshioki wa Guu! Nakanaori wa Paa!" (Japanese: おしおきはグー！なかなおりはパー！)	Jun Fujiwara	Shigeru Murakoshi	Jun Fujiwara	May 28, 2025
Over the twenty years, Yachiyo has remained stranded in space, a now adult Ponko operates the hotel in her stead, which has now started to attract more extraterrestrial guests. One night, an arriving ship collides with Yachiyo and sends her falling back to Earth. Ponko recovers Yachiyo's body and spends the next fifty years repairing it. During that time, Yachiyo dreams of the time she was first activated and instructed by the hotel owner to learn how to empathize with other people's feelings. When Yachiyo finally awakes, she is disheartened to see that Ponko could only repair her with ramshackle parts. While the hotel is now thriving, Yachiyo cannot derive any enjoyment from it since she cannot perform her old duties with her new body. She eventually snaps and becomes a roving delinquent, forcing Ponko to build a mecha suit to beat some sense back into Yachiyo. Realizing that Ponko and the hotel staff care deeply about her, Yachiyo finally calms down and reassumes her post as the acting manager.
9	"Bookmark Today's Page in Our Guests' Lives"; Transliteration: "Okyakusama no Jinsei ni, Kyou to Iu Shiori o" (Japanese: お客様の人生に、今日という栞を)	Migmi	Shigeru Murakoshi	Takaomi Kanasaki	June 4, 2025
Ponko introduces Yachiyo to her fiancé Ponstin, who she met when he arrived at the hotel as a guest, and tells her that they plan to marry. After securing the blessing of her parents (even though Mami doesn't approve at first) and discovering that Yachiyo still harbors bits of her rebellious persona after she pummels Bumbuku and Ponstin, Ponko asks for the wedding to be held at the hotel, to which Yachiyo agrees. As the preparations are being made, Ponko's grandmother, Mujina, decides to stay at the hotel for a night despite her declining health so that she can observe Ponko at work. However, shortly after she returns home, Mujina passes away. In her grief, Ponko requests the wedding be postponed until Mujina's funeral is completed. Recalling the hotel owner's lesson about creating unforgettable memories for their guests, Yachiyo instead suggest they hold the wedding and funeral at the same time, as that is what Mujina would have wanted as well. Ponko later helps Yachiyo fully restore her original body. The dual wedding and funeral is held, and during the festivities, Yachiyo plays a posthumous video message Mujina left behind, where she thanks Yachiyo for taking care of Ponko, congratulates Ponko, and tells her to live a full and happy life. The wedding and funeral ends with a sky lantern festival to send Mujina's spirit off to the afterlife and Ponko thanks Yachiyo for everything she's done.
10	"Clean Sheets Symbolize Pure Hearts"; Transliteration: "Shītsu no Shiro sa wa, Kokoro no Shiro sa" (Japanese: シーツの白さは 心の白さ)	Shinya Kawabe, Yasuhira Kido, Fumiaki Kataoka & Yorihiro Tanimoto	Soutarou Wada	Iku Suzuki	June 11, 2025
Many years after Mujina's death, Ponko and Ponstin now have a daughter named Tamako. Yachiyo greets a guest called Slurpity Slurp who requests to stay one night in complete privacy. The next day, Ponko investigates Slurpity Slurp's room when he is overdue for checkout, and is shocked to find his corpse. Unable to determine how he died or who killed him, Yachiyo decides to cover up Slurpity Slurp's death to protect the hotel's reputation. However, their attempts to hide Slurpity Slurp's body are complicated by the arrival of Squirtity Squirt, a detective who is tracking the infamous terrorist and serial bomber Sneakity Sneak, who is actually Slurpity Slurp's true identity. Thanks to a series of misunderstandings and complications caused by Tamako, Squirtity Squirt pursues Yachiyo and Ponko, who continue to try and hide Sneakity Sneak's body. Squirtity Squirt corners them, but suddenly dies in the same way Sneakity Sneak did. Yachiyo and Ponko decide to cover up both deaths and bury Sneakity Sneak and Squirtity Squirt next to Mujina's grave.
11	"Wag Your Tail, but Never Wag a Shift!"; Transliteration: "Ana wa Hotte mo Akeruna Shifuto!" (Japanese: 穴は掘っても空けるなシフト!)	Liao Chengzhi, Kana Shundo, Yasuhira Kido, Hiroko Seigan & Yorihiro Tanimoto	Shigeru Murakoshi	Liao Chengzhi	June 18, 2025
After studying Japanese labor laws, Ponko orders Yachiyo to take the next two days off from work. Initially unsure of what to do, Yachiyo checks into the hotel as a guest. While staying in her room, she performs a system check and discovers one of her parts is starting to break down. She then begins exploring the ruins of Ginza in order find a replacement part. Along the way, she stops by what's left of Ginza's various landmarks and tourist destinations. Finally, she comes across the ruins of another hotel that was once staffed by robots, and finds a broken down model that matches her own. She recovers an intact replacement part from the broken down robot and returns to the hotel. When Ponko asks how her vacation was, she replies that she "felt alive".
12	"Aim to Be the Number One Hotel in the Galaxy"; Transliteration: "Ginga Ichi no Hoteru o Mezashite" (Japanese: 銀河一のホテルを目指して)	Kana Shundo	Shigeru Murakoshi	Kana Shundo	June 25, 2025
A spaceship crash-lands on Earth and its occupant arrives at the hotel; it is revealed to be a human girl. Yachiyo and the hotel staff are surprised to welcome their very first human guest in centuries, Tomari Iori. Tomari explains that humanity is still living a nomadic existence in their interstellar arks, and she was sent to survey Earth to see if it is habitable again. As Ponko's family help repair Tomari's spaceship, Environmental Checker Robot then reveals to her that the infortunium pollution virus has been cleansed from Earth thanks to the plant that has grown from alien seed that was gifted to Yachiyo. Tomari removes her spacesuit and is ecstatic that the virus is gone. However, she quickly falls ill, and Ponstin explains that due to their extended stay in space, humans aren't compatible with Earth's environment anymore. Meanwhile, Yachiyo is left conflicted because she doesn't feel any different serving a human guest, until Ponko points out that just means she values both human and extraterrestrial guests equally, which cheers her up. The next day, Tomari decides to return to the human fleet, but promises to bring humans back to visit someday. In the meantime, Yachiyo and the staff continue to operate the hotel and serve guests.

=== Manga ===
A spin-off manga series illustrated by Takemoto, titled Apocalypse Hotel Pusupusu (アポカリプスホテルぷすぷす, Apokaripusu Hoteru Pusupusu), was serialized on Takeshobo's Storia Dash manga website from April 11 to June 27, 2025.

No.	Release date	ISBN
1	July 7, 2025	978-4-8019-8691-6
Chapters 1–12

== Reception ==
Apocalypse Hotel was named one of the best anime series of Spring 2025 by Anime News Network (ANN). They also named both Yachiyo and Ponko among the best anime characters the whole of 2025, while Yachiyo's quiet break in the 11th episode "Wag Your Tail, but Never Wag a Shift!" was one of the best anime moments of 2025. American magazine New York Times also featured Episode 11 as one of The Best TV Episodes of 2025. The series was voted "Most Underrated Anime" in ANN's 2025 Readers' Choice Awards. The anime was also appreciated by co-founders of Type-Moon, Takashi Takeuchi and Kinoko Nasu. Nasu called Apocalypse Hotel not only one of the best anime of 2025 but also of this century, while Takeuchi said that it made him laugh and cry so hard at the same time. The series was nominated for Best Original Anime at the 10th Crunchyroll Anime Awards in 2026.

The show's entry in The Encyclopedia of Science Fiction notes that "Though it takes a little while to find its feet, particularly the humour, once up and running this anime establishes itself as a very good and enjoyable work, tonally varied from farce (see Absurdist SF) to reflectiveness".

The series won the 57th Seiun Award in the Best Media category, while its manga spin-off won in the Best Comic category. It was nominated in the Daruma for Best Slice of Life Anime category at the Japan Expo Awards in 2026.
