= Kō Kojima =

Japanese manga artist

- 小島 功
- Born: March 3, 1928; Taito
- Died: April 14, 2015 (aged 87)
- Education: Kawabata Art Academy
- Notable work: Sennin Buraku
- Style: Manga
- Awards: 1968 Bungeishunjū Manga Prize

Kō Kojima (小島 功, Kojima Kō; March 3, 1928 – April 14, 2015) was a Japanese manga artist. He was best known for penning Sennin Buraku (running since 1956 in Weekly Asahi Geinō), the longest running comic by a single artist. He attended the private Kawabata Art Academy (川端画学校, Kawabata Gagakkō) in Koishikawa (now part of Bunkyō, Tokyo), after which he began attending Taiheiyō Fine Arts Academy before dropping out partway through school.

Ko was born in Taito. From his elementary years through high school, Kojima began drawing manga, and in 1949 he made his professional debut as a member of the Dokuritsu Mangaha. That group broke up in 1959, and in 1964 he joined the Japan Manga Artist Cooperative and the Manga Shūdan, participating in both groups regularly.

Due to the adult and modern nature of his works, as well as his unusual drawing style, his works became very popular, garnering him the 1968 Bungeishunjū Manga Prize from the literary magazine Bungeishunjū for his work Nihon no Kaa-chan. Other works include the long running Sennin Buraku, as well as Hige to Boin, which ran from 1974 to 2014 in Shogakukan's Big Comic Original manga magazine. The main character of the latter series is a sake-brewing kappa.

Kojima made regular appearances on the Tokyo 12ch (now TV Tokyo) news discussion show Asahi Shimbun Wide News where he discussed current events and shared satirical illustrations with the viewers.

The manga artist Moyoco Anno (who is married to anime director Hideaki Anno) is Kojima's niece.
