= Weekly Asahi Geinō =

Japanese magazine

Weekly Asahi Geinō 週刊アサヒ芸能
- Cover of the 7 September 2006 issue of Weekly Asahi Geinō.
- Categories: Entertainment, Sex
- Frequency: Weekly
- Publisher: Hirotomo Takei
- First issue: January 1946
- Company: Tokuma Shoten
- Country: Japan
- Based in: Tokyo
- Language: Japanese

Weekly Asahi Geinō (週刊アサヒ芸能, Shūkan Asahi Geinō), often shortened to simply Asahi Geinō or Asagei (アサ芸), is a shūkanshi founded by Hirotomo Takei and published by Tokuma Shoten in Japan. It was first published under the title Weekly Asahi Geinō Newspaper (週刊アサヒ芸能新聞, Shūkan Asahi Geinō Shinbun) in January 1946, though the title and size were changed to the current one in October 1956. The longest-running manga in the world by a single author, Sennin Buraku by Kō Kojima, was published in the first issue with the new title, and ran from 1956 to 2014.

The magazine tends to focus on sensationalized stories, celebrity gossip, stories about yakuza, articles with risqué or erotic content or topics, and scandals. About 90% of the readership are married, male salarymen. Asahi Geinō frequently has articles related to sex, and participates in campaigns to stem the AIDS epidemic.

Translations of and commentaries on articles from Asahi Geinō were common in the English language newspaper Mainichi Daily News's now-discontinued column WaiWai. Other articles in Asahi Geinō have covered include an apparent rise in 20-something virgins, the possibility of breast milk being a cure for obesity, and accusations of groping while on a train (and advice on how to avoid being falsely accused).

Weekly Asahi Geinō is not related to the similarly titled Weekly Asahi (which is owned by the also-unrelated Asahi Shimbun).

== Criticism ==
The Asahi Geino has been criticized for attacking Japan's sex education while at the same time publishing nude photographs and sex-related articles and stories.
