= Inakappe Taishō =

Japanese manga series

- Cover art from the DVD release of the series

いなかっぺ大将
- Genre: Comedy, sports (judo)
- Manga
- Written by: Noboru Kawasaki
- Published by: Shogakukan
- Magazine: Shogakukan no Gakushū Zasshi
- Original run: 1967 – 1972
- Anime television series
- Directed by: Hiroshi Sasagawa
- Music by: Masahiko Nakamura
- Studio: Tatsunoko Production
- Original network: FNS (Fuji TV)
- Original run: October 4, 1970 – September 24, 1972
- Episodes: 104 (2 segments/episode)

Inakappe Taishō (Japanese: いなかっぺ大将; lit. 'The Hick Judo Champion') is a Japanese manga series by Noboru Kawasaki and serialized by Shogakukan in Shogakukan no Gakushū Zasshi. The manga series won the 14th Shogakukan Manga Award. An anime adaptation was created by Tatsunoko Production.

== Plot ==
A lively boy named Daizaemon in traditional Japanese clothing comes with kinds of animals to the capital of Tokyo. He has a comical habit of dancing whenever he hears music. He visits a friend of his late father's to learn judo and makes friends with the young daughter of the judo master Kikuko and the cat Nyanko-sensei. For a little girl, Kikuko has remarkable judo tricks inherited from her father, while Nyanko-sensei is able to perform a difficult trick of triple turn in the air. Both of them are worthy instructors for Daizaemon. Although he shows clownish behavior once in a while, he is always popular among people around and grows stout and shrewd to be a future champion.

== Characters ==
Daizaemon Kaze
Voiced by: Masako Nozawa
Nicknamed "Dai-chan," he comes from Aomori and is a country boy. He always wears a hakama and plays judo. He moves to Tokyo after the death of his father. He has good intentions but is often naive.
Nyanko-sensei
Voiced by: Kinya Aikawa
A cat with a tiger-like appearance who helps Daizaemon.
Kikuko Ogaki
Voiced by: Mari Okamoto
A beautiful girl who Daizaemon falls in love with at first sight. This is Okamoto's debut role at the age of 16.
Hanako Mori
Voiced by: Kazuko Sugiyama
A childhood friend of Daizaemon.
Yagoro Ogaki
Voiced by: Tōru Ōhira
Kikuko's father.
Nishi Ishiboshi
Voiced by: Shun Yashiro
Daizaemon's mischievous friend who is from Osaka.
"Tori" Maruko Tono
Voiced by: Hiroko Maruyama
One of Daizaemon's classmates.
Nana Shirayuki-sensei
Voiced by:Haruko Kitahama
The beautiful teacher who tends to the rose garden.

== Release ==
The series was broadcast from October 4, 1970, to September 24, 1972, for 208 15 minute episodes (technically 104). It was rebroadcast in Japan in 2014 and 2015.
