= Fumio Hisamatsu =

Japanese manga artist (1943–2021)

- 久松 文雄
- Born: April 24, 1943; Aichi Prefecture, Nagoya, Japan
- Died: April 16, 2021 (aged 77)
- Known for: Manga
- Notable work: Super Jetter

Fumio Hisamatsu (久松 文雄, Hisamatsu Fumio; April 24, 1943 – April 16, 2021) was a Japanese manga artist and character designer who frequently worked with TCJ in the 1960s and illustrated manga adaptations of their television series. In particular he created the manga for Super Jetter as well as serving as the anime's character designer. He also did the character designs for TCJ's Adventure on Gaboten Island. Hisamatsu wanted to be a manga artist since he was in third grade, and began writing manga in junior high school. His first work was Earth Crisis (地球危し, Chikyū Abunashi) and was also his professional debut. He was an assistant to Osamu Tezuka.

== Manga ==
- Super Light's Dangerous Earth Crisis! (スーパー・ライトの活躍 地球危し!, Sūpā raito no katsuyaku chikyū abunashi!) (Masakazu Manga Publishing, 1958) under the name Yumeji Tanaka
- Hit the Pistol (拳銃にかけろ, Kenjū ni kakero) (Bōken'ō, 1961)
- Dangerous Pistol (拳銃にきけ!, Kenjū ni kike) (Bōken'ō, 1962)
- Gorath (妖星ゴラス, Yōsei gorasu) (Bōken'ō, 1962)
- Shooting Star Billy (流れ星ビリー, Nagareboshi birī) (Bōken'ō, 1962)
- Mothra vs. Godzilla (モスラ対ゴジラ, Mosura tai gojira) (Bōken'ō, 1964)
- Fujimaru of the Wind (少年忍者風のフジ丸, Shōnen Ninja Kaze no Fujimaru) originally by Sanpei Shirato (We, July 1964-September 1965)
- Super Jetter (スーパージェッター, Sūpājettā) (Weekly Shōnen Sunday, January 1965-January 1966)
- Ultra Seven (ウルトラセブン, Urutorasebun) (Tanoshi Yōchien, 1968)
- Adventure Gaboten Island (冒険ガボテン島, Bōken gabotenjima) (Weekly Shōnen Sunday)
- Mighty Jack (マイティジャック, Maitijakku)
- Sasuke (サスケ) originally by Sanpei Shirato (1968)
- Adventure Girl Miss Wonder (冒険少女 ミス・ワンダー, Bōken shōjo misu wandā) (Nakayoshi, 1968)
- Mimi-chan's Diary (みみちゃん日記, Mimi-chan nikki) (Kibou no Tomo, 1968)
- Mirrorman (ミラーマン, Mirāman) (September 1969-March 1970)
- Miracle Ultraman (まけるなウルトラマン, Makeru na Urutoraman) (Shōnen Book, 1970)
- Return of Ultraman (帰ってきたウルトラマン, Kaettekita urutoraman)
- Ultraman Ace (ウルトラマンA, Urutoraman Ēsu)
- UFO Warrior Dipolon (UFO戦士ダイアポロン, Yūfō senshi daiaporon) (TV-kun, 1976)
- Dinosaur Expedition Born Free (恐竜探険隊ボーンフリー, Kyōryū tanken-tai bōnfurī) (TV-kun, 1976–1977)
- Yatterman (ヤッターマン, Yattāman) (TV-kun, 1977)

=== With Shinsuke Mitani ===
All serialized in Weekly Heibon

- Gon Shakes the Tail (ゴンよ尾を振れ, Gon yo o o fure) (1973–1974)
- Walk! Yoko (歩け! 陽子, Aruke! Yōko) (1974)
- Nitamono Couple (ニタモノ夫婦, Nitamono fūfu) (1974)
- Keep It! Bamba (けっぱれ! 輓馬, Keppare; Banba) (1974)

=== With Shin Hayama ===
All serialized in Weekly Heibon

- Tanukiyama Zessho (狸山絶唱) (1974)
- Falling Monkey Gosuke (落ち猿ゴスケ, Ochi saru gosuke) (1974)
- Hanako and Dad (花子と父さん, Hanako to tōsan) (1974)

=== Historical manga ===
- Learning Manga Japanese History (Volume 1, Volume 3, Vol. 8, Vol. 11, Vol. 14, Vol. 18 (supervised by Kazuo Kasahara)
- Sengoku Heroes (written by Sentaro Kubota)
- Shiki (written by Sentaro Kubota)
- Zhuge Liang (written by Sentaro Kubota)
- Lady Kasuga (originally by Kazuhisa Hori)
- San'yumeden (originally by Lee Won-hin)
- Takeshi and soul (originally by Lee Won-hin)
- Manga: Japan's Diplomacy Problem (supervision: Taro Yayama)
- Read manga Kojiki (Aoi Hayashido?)
- Zen Master Dōgen (Vol. 1,2,3; written by Ryodô Awaya)
