= Noboru Kawasaki =

Japanese manga artist

Noboru Kawasaki 川崎のぼる
- Born: January 28, 1941 (age 85) Osaka, Japan
- Area: Manga artist
- Notable works: Star of the Giants; Animal 1; Inakappe Taishō; Football Hawk
- Awards: Shogakukan Manga Award in the shōjo category for Animal 1 and Inakappe Taishō; Kodansha Children's Manga Award for Star of the Giants; Kodansha Manga Award in the shōnen category for Football Hawk

Noboru Kawasaki (Japanese: 川崎のぼる, Hepburn: Kawasaki Noboru; born January 28, 1941) is a Japanese manga artist. He is best known for illustrating the series Star of the Giants. He won the 14th Shogakukan Manga Award in 1969 for Animal 1 and Inakappe Taishō as well as the eighth Kodansha Children's Manga Award for Star of the Giants in 1967 and its successor Kodansha Manga Award in the shōnen category for Football Hawk in 1978. He is also the creator of The Song of Tentomushi, Skyers 5, and Kōya no Shōnen Isamu.

== Works ==
- Ame ni mo Makezu (4 volumes, 1983)
- Animal 1 (4 volumes, 1968)
- Captain Gorō (1 volume, 1968)
- Daimakujira (1 volume, 1968)
- Dōdō Yarō (1 volume, 1970)
- Football Hawk (10 volumes, 1977)
- Fukidamari (1 volume, 1976)
- Honoo no Michi (1 volume, 1987)
- Inakappe Taishō (6 volumes, 1970)
- Kōya no Shōnen Isamu (12 volumes, 1971)
- Kuroi Kuroi Tani (2 volumes, 1967)
- Musashi, with writer Kazuo Koike, (13 volumes, 1974)
- Otoko no Jōken (2 volumes, 1968)
- Rōnin Tanbee Zetsumei (1 volume, 1987)
- Shi no Toride (1 volume, 1967)
- Skyers 5 (3 volumes, 1966–1968)
- Star of the Giants (19 volumes, 1966)
  - Shin Kyojin no Hoshi (11 volumes, 1978)
- Shinigami Hakase 1967
- The Song of Tentomushi (4 volumes, 1973)
- Tiger 66 (1 volume, 1968)
