= Journal of Musculoskeletal Research =

- Discipline: Orthopedics
- Language: English
- Edited by: Po-Quang Chen, Li-Shan Chou

Publication details
- History: 1997-present
- Publisher: World Scientific
- Frequency: Quarterly

Standard abbreviations
- ISO 4: J. Musculoskelet. Res.

Indexing
- ISSN: 0218-9577 (print); 1793-6497 (web)
- LCCN: sv98000418
- OCLC no.: 884766272

Links
- Journal homepage; Online archive

The Journal of Musculoskeletal Research is a quarterly peer-reviewed medical journal covering clinical and basic research in the human musculoskeletal system. It was established in 1997 and is published by World Scientific. The journal covers musculoskeletal disorders, orthopedics, neurology, rheumatology, and rehabilitation. The editors-in-chief are Po-Quang Chen (National Taiwan University Hospital ) and Li-Shan Chou (University of Oregon).

== Abstracting and indexing ==
The journal is abstracted and indexed in:

- Biological Abstracts
- BIOSIS Previews
- CSA databases
- EBSCO databases
- EMBASE
- Inspec
- ProQuest databases
- Scopus
