= Japan Media Review =

English academic online journal

Japan Media Review is an English academic online journal dedicated to the Japanese press.

The Japan Media Review describes itself as "an online-only journal that examines how emerging technologies are changing the practice, ethics, law, business and politics of journalism in Japan.

The Japan Media Review project is supported by the Title VI Program of the U.S. Department of Education for Technological Innovation and Cooperation for Foreign Information Access, authorized under Title VI (Sec. 606) Part A of the Higher Education Act. JMR is a joint project of the University of Southern California Annenberg School for Communication, the USC East Asian Studies Center and GLOCOM—the Center for Global Communications at the International University of Japan. JMR was launched in March 2003 and is a sister publication of Online Journalism Review.

Japan Media Review publishes new reports on the forces that are changing journalism and communications in Japan.
