= List of manga artists =

This is a list of notable manga artists. Romanized names are written in Western order (given names before family names), whereas kanji names are written in Japanese order (family names before given names). Many of them are pen names.

== Individuals ==
=== A ===
- Yoshitoshi Abe (安倍 吉俊)
- Chako Abeno (阿倍野ちゃこ)
- Mitsuru Adachi (あだち 充) (creator of Touch, H2 and Cross Game)
- Tsutomu Adachi (あだち 勉)
- Tadashi Agi (亜樹 直)
- Yu Aida (相田 裕)
- Koji Aihara (相原 コージ)
- Miki Aihara (相原 実貴)
- Mizuho Aimoto (愛本 みずほ)
- Haruka Aizawa (あいざわ 遥)
- Michiyo Akaishi (赤石 路代)
- Ken Akamatsu (赤松 健) (creator of A.I. Love You and Love Hina)
- Fujio Akatsuka (赤塚 不二夫)
- Nami Akimoto (秋元 奈美)
- Osamu Akimoto (秋本 治)
- Matsuri Akino (秋乃 茉莉)
- Tamayo Akiyama (秋山 たまよ)
- Risu Akizuki (秋月 りす)
- Gege Akutami (芥見下々) (creator of Jujutsu Kaisen)
- Akira Amano (天野 明) (creator of Reborn!)
- Kozue Amano (天野 こずえ)
- Shiro Amano (天野 シロ)
- Yōichi Amano (天野 洋一)
- Yoshitaka Amano (天野 喜孝)
- Mogura Anagura (あなぐら もぐら)
- Masahiro Anbe (安部 真弘)
- Jiro Ando (安藤 慈朗)
- Natsumi Ando (安藤 なつみ)
- Yuma Ando (安藤 夕馬)
- Moyoco Anno (安野 モヨコ)
- Nobuyuki Anzai (安西 信行)
- Futaba Aoi (葵 二葉)
- Yasuko Aoike (青池 保子)
- Kotomi Aoki (青木 琴美)
- Mitsue Aoki (青木 光恵)
- Takao Aoki (青木 たかお)
- Ume Aoki (蒼樹 うめ)
- Yūji Aoki (青木 雄二)
- Takako Aonuma (青沼 貴子)
- Gosho Aoyama (青山 剛昌) (creator of Detective Conan)
- Hideki Arai (新井 秀樹)
- Kiyoko Arai (あらい きよこ)
- Shou Arai (新井 祥)
- Hiromu Arakawa (荒川 弘) (creator of Fullmetal Alchemist)
- Naoshi Arakawa (新川 直司)
- Hirohiko Araki (荒木 飛呂彦) (creator of JoJo's Bizarre Adventure)
- Kanao Araki (あらき かなお)
- Keiichi Arawi (あらゐ けいいち)
- Keitarō Arima (有馬 啓太郎)
- Kyoko Ariyoshi (有吉 京子)
- Hiroshi Aro (田母神 慈宏)
- Aruko (アルコ)
- Hiroyuki Asada (浅田 弘幸)
- Sakura Asagi (あさぎ 桜)
- Yū Asagiri (あさぎり 夕)
- Yuya Asahina (朝比奈 ゆうや)
- Masashi Asaki (朝基 まさし)
- Kia Asamiya (麻宮 騎亜)
- Inio Asano (浅野 いにお)
- Hinako Ashihara (芦原 妃名子)
- Hitoshi Ashinano (芦奈野 ひとし)
- Haro Aso (麻生羽呂)
- Izumi Aso (麻生 いずみ)
- Min Ayahana (彩花 みん)
- Rando Ayamine (綾峰 欄人)
- Hideo Azuma (吾妻 ひでお)
- Kiyohiko Azuma (あずま きよひこ) (creator of Azumanga Daioh and Yotsuba&!)
- Mayumi Azuma (東 まゆみ)
- Ryō Azumi (あずみ 椋)

=== B ===
- Ippongi Bang (一本木 蛮)
- Daichi Banjou (万乗大智)
- Barasui (ばらスィ)
- Boichi
- Frédéric Boilet
- Buronson (武論尊) (creator of Fist of the North Star)

=== C ===
- Carnelian
- Tartan Check (たあたんちぇっく)
- Akio Chiba (ちば あきお or 千葉 亜喜生)
- Kiyokazu Chiba (千葉 きよかず or 千葉 潔和)
- Tetsuya Chiba (ちば てつや)
- Nanae Chrono (黒乃 奈々絵)

=== E ===
- Tatsuya Egawa (江川 達也)
- Hisashi Eguchi (江口 寿史)
- Eiki Eiki (影木 栄貴) (creator of Train Train)
- Tatsuma Ejiri (江尻 立真)
- Emura (絵夢羅) (creator of W Juliet)
- Hiroki Endo (遠藤 浩輝)
- Tatsuya Endo (遠藤 達哉) (creator of Spy × Family)
- Shunji Enomoto (榎本俊二)
- Kei Enue (えぬえ けい)
- Est em (えすとえむ) (creator of Seduce Me After the Show)

=== F ===
- Mihona Fujii (藤井 みほな)
- Rino Fujii (藤井 理乃) (creator of Happiness!)
- Tatsuki Fujimoto (藤本 タツキ) (creator of Chainsaw Man)
- Ryu Fujisaki (藤崎 竜)
- Tooru Fujisawa (藤沢 とおる) (creator of Great Teacher Onizuka)
- Kōsuke Fujishima (藤島 康介)
- Kazuhiro Fujita (藤田 和日郎)
- Kazuko Fujita (藤田 和子) (creator of Makoto Call!)
- Maguro Fujita (藤田 まぐろ)
- Cocoa Fujiwara (藤原 ここあ) (creator of Inu x Boku SS)
- Hiro Fujiwara (藤原 ヒロ)
- Yoshihide Fujiwara (藤原 芳秀)
- Tsubasa Fukuchi (福地 翼) (creator of The Law of Ueki)
- Eiichi Fukui (福井 英一)
- Nobuyuki Fukumoto (福本 伸行)
- Haruka Fukushima (フクシマ ハルカ)
- Sho Fumimura (史村 翔) (see Yoshiyuki Okamura)
- Kou Fumizuki (文月 晃)
- Haruichi Furudate (古舘 春一) (creator of Haikyuu!!)
- Minoru Furuya (古谷 実)
- Mitsutoshi Furuya (古谷三敏)
- Usamaru Furuya (古屋 兎丸)
- Kazuki Funatsu (creator of Addicted to Curry)

=== G ===
- Hiroshi Gamō (ガモウ ひろし)
- George Akiyama (ジョージ秋山)
- George Asakura (ジョージ朝倉)
- Keiji Gotoh (後藤 圭二)
- GotoP (ごとP)
- Koyoharu Gotouge (吾峠 呼世晴) (creator of Demon Slayer)

=== H ===
- Moto Hagio (萩尾 望都)
- Kazushi Hagiwara (萩原 一至)
- Ryusuke Hamamoto (畑中 純) (creator of Petit Eva: Evangelion@School)
- Youko Hanabusa (英 洋子) (creator of Lady!!)
- Pink Hanamori (花森 ぴんく) (creator of Mermaid Melody Pichi Pichi Pitch)
- Kazuichi Hanawa (花輪和一)
- Hidenori Hara (原 秀則)
- Taira Hara (はら たいら)
- Tetsuo Hara (原 哲夫)
- Yutaka Hara (原 ゆたか)
- Sunao Hari (針 すなお)
- Etsumi Haruki (はるき 悦巳)
- Shohei Harumoto (東本 昌平) (creator of SS)
- Nanae Haruno (榛野 なな恵)
- Nana Haruta (春田 なな)
- Machiko Hasegawa (長谷川 町子)
- Takashi Hashiguchi (橋口 たかし) (creator of Yakitate!! Japan)
- Mitsuo Hashimoto (はしもと みつお or 橋本 光男)
- Kenjiro Hata (畑 健二郎) (creator of Hayate no Gotoku)
- Jun Hatanaka (畑中 純)
- Bisco Hatori (葉鳥 ビスコ) (creator of Ouran High School Host Club)
- Akiko Hatsu (波津 彬子)
- Mitsuru Hattori (はっとり みつる)
- Miki Hayasaka (早坂 未紀)
- Fumino Hayashi (林 ふみの) (creator of Neon Genesis Evangelion: Angelic Days)
- Q Hayashida (林田 球) (creator of Dorohedoro)
- Shizuru Hayashiya (林家 志弦) (creator of Hayate X Blade)
- Reine Hibiki (ひびき 玲音) (creator of Maria-sama ga Miteru)
- Yukari Higa (緋賀 ゆかり) (creator of Magical Record Lyrical Nanoha Force)
- Akiko Higashimura (東村 アキコ) (creator of Kuragehime)
- Asa Higuchi (ひぐち アサ)
- Daisuke Higuchi (樋口 大輔)
- Tachibana Higuchi (樋口 橘) (creator of Gakuen Alice and Portrait of M and N)
- You Higuri (氷栗 優)
- Aoi Hiiragi (柊 あおい)
- Hidekaz Himaruya (日丸屋 秀和) (creator of Hetalia: Axis Powers)
- Hideshi Hino (日野 日出志)
- Matsuri Hino (樋野 まつり) (creator of Vampire Knight)
- Hisashi Hirai (平井 久司) (creator of Gundam SEED and Linebarrels of Iron)
- Kouta Hirano (平野 耕太) (creator of Hellsing)
- Hiroshi Hirata (平田 弘史)
- Rei Hiroe (広江 礼威) (creator of Black Lagoon)
- Kenshi Hirokane (弘兼 憲史)
- Hiroyuki (ヒロユキ)
- Tatsuya Hiruta (蛭田 達也) (creator of Kōtarō Makaritōru!)
- Saki Hiwatari (日渡 早紀)
- Tsukasa Hojo (北条 司)
- Yutori Hōjō (方條 ゆとり) (creator of Higurashi no Naku Koro ni)
- Yukine Honami (穂波 ゆきね)
- Yuji Horii (堀井 雄二)
- Kōhei Horikoshi (堀越 耕平) (creator of My Hero Academia)
- Katsura Hoshino (星野 桂) (creator of D.Gray-Man)
- Kōichirō Hoshino (星野 倖一郎)
- Lily Hoshino (星野 リリィ)
- Yukinobu Hoshino (星野 之宣)
- Chieko Hosokawa (細川 智栄子) (creator of Attention Please and Crest of the Royal Family)
- Fujihiko Hosono (細野 不二彦)
- Yumi Hotta (ほった ゆみ) (creator of Hikaru no Go)
- Kouta Hirano (平野 耕太)

=== I ===
- Yukari Ichijo (一条 ゆかり)
- Masato Ichishiki (一式 まさと)
- Aguri Igarashi (五十嵐 あぐり) (creator of Bamboo Blade)
- Daisuke Igarashi (五十嵐 大介)
- Mikio Igarashi (いがらし みきお)
- Satsuki Igarashi (いがらし 寒月)
- Yumiko Igarashi (いがらし ゆみこ)
- Akihisa Ikeda (池田 晃久) (creator of Rosario + Vampire)
- Riyoko Ikeda (池田 理代子)
- Ryoichi Ikegami (池上 遼一)
- Gō Ikeyamada (池山田 剛)
- Satomi Ikezawa (池沢 理美)
- Ryo Ikuemi (いくえみ 綾)
- Mia Ikumi (征海 未亜) (creator of Tokyo Mew Mew)
- Ichiko Ima (今市子)
- Kami Imai (今井 神)
- Koji Inada (稲田 浩司)
- Riichiro Inagaki (稲垣 理一郎) (writer of Eyeshield 21 and Dr. Stone)
- Kazurou Inoue (井上 和郎)
- Santa Inoue (井上 三太)
- Takehiko Inoue (井上 雄彦) (creator of Vagabond and Slam Dunk)
- Kira Inugami (狗神 煌)
- Sekihiko Inui (犬威赤彦) (creator of Murder Princess)
- Hajime Isayama (諫山 創) (creator of Attack on Titan)
- Sui Ishida (石田 スイ) (creator of Tokyo Ghoul)
- Hisaichi Ishii (いしい ひさいち)
- Takashi Ishii (石井 隆)
- Ken Ishikawa (石川 賢)
- Yūgo Ishikawa (石川 優吾)
- Shotaro Ishinomori (石ノ森 章太郎)
- Osamu Ishiwata (石渡 治)
- Makoto Isshiki (一色まこと) (creator of Piano no Mori)
- Isutoshi (いすとし)
- Keisuke Itagaki (板垣 恵介)
- Paru Itagaki (板垣 巴留) (creator of Beastars)
- Akihiro Ito (伊藤 明弘)
- Akira Itō (伊藤 彰) (creator of Yu-Gi-Oh! R)
- Junji Ito (伊藤 潤二)
- Noizi Ito (いとう のいぢ) (writer of Shakugan no Shana and Haruhi Suzumiya)
- Takehiko Ito (伊東 岳彦)
- Risa Itō (伊藤 理佐)
- Shimpei Itoh (伊藤 伸平)
- Natsumi Itsuki (樹 なつみ)
- Hitoshi Iwaaki (岩明 均)
- Mariko Iwadate (岩館 真理子)
- Yuji Iwahara (岩原 裕二)
- Hisae Iwaoka (岩岡 ヒサエ)
- Takashi Iwashige (いわしげ 孝)
- Toshiaki Iwashiro (岩代 俊明) (creator of Psyren)
- Mann Izawa (井沢 満)
- Kaneyoshi Izumi (和泉 かねよし)

=== J ===
- Judal (ジュダル)

=== K ===
- Yuna Kagesaki (影崎 由那)
- Naoyuki Kageyama (影山 なおゆき)
- Shintaro Kago (駕籠 真太郎)
- Hiroyuki Kaidō (海童 博行)
- Sōsuke Kaise (海瀬 壮祐)
- Shinobu Kaitani (甲斐谷忍)
- Ikki Kajiwara (梶原 一騎)
- Kakifly (かきふらい) (creator of K-On!)
- Narumi Kakinouchi (垣野内 成美)
- Yuji Kaku (賀来 ゆうじ) (creator of Hell's Paradise)
- Teruo Kakuta
- Yuhki Kamatani (鎌谷 悠希)
- Atsushi Kamijo (上條 敦士)
- Akimine Kamijyo (上条 明峰)
- Kazuo Kamimura (上村 一夫)
- Yoko Kamio (神尾 葉子)
- Yozaburo Kanari (金成 陽三郎)
- Akira Kanbe (かんべ あきら)
- Muneyuki Kaneshiro (金城 宗幸)
- Aya Kanno (菅野 文)
- Yasuhiro Kanō (叶 恭弘)
- Masaomi Kanzaki (神崎 将臣)
- Junko Karube (軽部 潤子)
- Manavu Kashimoto (樫本 学ヴ)
- Kazue Kato (加藤 和恵) (creator of Blue Exorcist)
- Kazuhiko Kato (加藤 一彦) (creator of Lupin III)
- Motohiro Katou (加藤 元浩)
- Susumu Katsumata (勝又 進)
- Masakazu Katsura (桂 正和)
- Yukimaru Katsura (桂 遊生丸)
- Kaiji Kawaguchi (かわぐち かいじ)
- Kazune Kawahara (河原 和音)
- Masatoshi Kawahara (川原 正敏)
- Yumiko Kawahara (川原 由美子)
- Homura Kawamoto (河本 ほむら)
- Mika Kawamura (川村 美香)
- Noboru Kawasaki (川崎 のぼる)
- Tadashi Kawashima (河島 正)
- Mizuki Kawashita (河下 水希)
- Kazumi Kazui (一井 かずみ)
- Maki Kazumi
- Izumi Kazuto (かずと いずみ)
- Toshie Kihara (木原 敏江)
- Moto Kikaku
- Minori Kimura (樹村 みのり)
- Sakura Kinoshita (木下 さくら)
- Shimoku Kio (木尾 士目)
- Yuki Kiriga (霧賀 ユキ)
- Izumi Kirihara (桐原 いづみ)
- Kōji Kiriyama (桐山 光侍)
- Masashi Kishimoto (岸本 斉史) (creator of Naruto)
- Seishi Kishimoto (岸本 聖史) (creator of 666 Satan)
- Yukito Kishiro (木城 ゆきと)
- Miyuki Kitagawa (北川 みゆき)
- Taku Kitazaki (北崎 拓)
- Rakuten Kitazawa (北沢 楽天)
- En Kitō (鬼頭 えん)
- Mohiro Kitoh (鬼頭 莫宏)
- Kazuhiro Kiuchi (きうち かずひろ or 木内 一裕)
- Totan Kobako (小箱 とたん)
- Jin Kobayashi (小林 尽)
- Kentarō Kobayashi (小林 賢太郎)
- Kiyochika Kobayashi (小林 清親)
- Makoto Kobayashi (小林 まこと)
- Miyuki Kobayashi (小林 深雪)
- Motofumi Kobayashi (小林 源文)
- Toshihiko Kobayashi (小林 俊彦)
- Yoshinori Kobayashi (小林 よしのり or 小林 善範)
- Ukyō Kodachi (小太刀 右京)
- Kazuma Kodaka (こだか 和麻)
- Koge-Donbo (コゲどんぼ) aka Kokoro Koharuno (小春こころ) (creator of Di Gi Charat and Kamichama Karin)
- Kazuo Koike (小池 一夫)
- Maya Koikeda (小池田 マヤ)
- Akira Kojima (小島 あきら)
- Goseki Kojima (小島 剛夕)
- Kō Kojima (小島 功)
- Naoshi Komi (古味 直志) (creator of Nisekoi)
- Ayumi Komura (小村 あゆみ)
- Satoshi Kon (今 敏)
- Yōko Kondō (近藤 ようこ)
- Fumiyo Kōno (こうの 史代)
- Takeshi Konomi (許斐 剛)
- Rikdo Koshi
- Tsukasa Kotobuki (ことぶき つかさ)
- Yun Kōga (高河 ゆん)
- Keito Koume (小梅 けいと)
- Yū Koyama (小山 ゆう)
- Tite Kubo (久保 帯人) (creator of Bleach)
- Eisaku Kubonouchi (窪之内 英策)
- Kōji Kumeta (久米田 康治)
- Shosuke Kurakane (倉金 章介)
- Fusako Kuramochi (くらもち ふさこ)
- Yuki Kure (呉 由姫)
- Yōji Kuri (久里 洋二)
- Iou Kuroda (黒田 硫黄)
- Masami Kurumada (車田 正美) (creator of Saint Seiya)
- Hidenori Kusaka (日下 秀憲)
- Nari Kusakawa (草川 為)
- Kei Kusunoki (楠 桂)
- Michiharu Kusunoki (楠 みちはる)
- Jiro Kuwata (桑田 二郎)
- Katsu Aki (克・亜樹)

=== M ===
- Henmaru Machino (町野 変丸)
- Jun Maeda (麻枝 准)
- Toshio Maeda (前田 俊夫)
- Takeshi Maekawa (前川 たけし)
- Miyako Maki (牧 美也子)
- Yoko Maki (槙 ようこ)
- Johji Manabe (真鍋 譲治)
- Suehiro Maruo (丸尾 末広)
- Usune Masatoshi (うすね 正俊)
- Hiro Mashima (真島 ヒロ) (creator of Fairy Tail)
- Kōsuke Masuda (増田 こうすけ)
- Hiroshi Masumura (ますむら ひろし)
- Sanami Matoh (真東 砂波)
- Yusei Matsui (松井 優征)
- Izumi Matsumoto (まつもと 泉)
- Jiro Matsumoto (松本 次郎)
- Katsuji Matsumoto (松本 かつぢ)
- Leiji Matsumoto (松本 零士)
- Masahiko Matsumoto (松本 正彦)
- Nina Matsumoto
- Taiyo Matsumoto (松本 大洋)
- Temari Matsumoto (松本 テマリ)
- Tomo Matsumoto (マツモト トモ)
- Akemi Matsunae (松苗 あけみ)
- Susumu Matsushita (松下 進)
- Tokihiko Matsuura (松浦 聡彦)
- Seiji Matsuyama (松山 せいじ)
- Mineo Maya (魔夜 峰央)
- Meimu
- Yuki Midorikawa (緑川 ゆき)
- Mitsukazu Mihara (三原 ミツカズ)
- Rei Mikamoto (三家本 礼)
- Haruhiko Mikimoto (美樹本 晴彦)
- Ryoji Minagawa (皆川 亮二)
- Kazuka Minami (南 かずか), also writes as Haruka Minami (みなみ 遥)
- Maki Minami (南 マキ)
- Yū Minamoto (みなもと 悠)
- Suu Minazuki (水無月 すう)
- Nobuaki Minegishi
- Kazuya Minekura (峰倉 かずや)
- Takaya Miou (高屋 未央)
- Juri Misaki (みさき 樹里)
- Norifusa Mita (三田 紀房)
- Ryūsuke Mita (見田 竜介)
- Takuya Mitsuda (満田 拓也)
- Suzue Miuchi (美内 すずえ)
- Kentaro Miura (三浦 建太郎) (creator of Berserk)
- Kouji Miura (三浦 糀) (creator of Blue Box, also writes as Satoshi Yūki (結城智史) and Amami (あまみ))
- Mitsuru Miura (三浦 みつる)
- Shirow Miwa (三輪 士郎)
- Riko Miyagi (宮城 理子)
- Tomochika Miyano (宮野 ともちか)
- Kaho Miyasaka (宮坂 香帆)
- Hayao Miyazaki (宮崎 駿) (creator of Nausicaä of the Valley of the Wind)
- Hakase Mizuki (水月 博士)
- Kyoko Mizuki (水木 杏子)
- Shigeru Mizuki (水木 しげる)
- Eita Mizuno (水野 英多)
- Hideko Mizuno (水野 英子)
- Junko Mizuno (水野 純子)
- Tohko Mizuno (水野 十子)
- Megumi Mizusawa (水沢めぐみ)
- Shinji Mizushima (水島 新司)
- Setona Mizushiro (水城 せとな)
- Jun Mochizuki (望月 淳)
- Mokona (もこな)
- Takeaki Momose (百瀬 武昭)
- Hideki Mori (森 秀樹)
- Kaoru Mori (森 薫)
- Taishi Mori (モリ タイシ)
- George Morikawa (森川 ジョージ)
- Ai Morinaga (森永 あい)
- Milk Morinaga (森永 みるく)
- Morishige (もりしげ)
- Masanori Morita (森田 まさのり)
- Daisuke Moriyama (森山 大輔) (creator of Chrono Crusade)
- Milk Morizono (森園 みるく)
- Daijiro Morohoshi (諸星 大二郎)
- Kyousuke Motomi (最富 キョウスケ) (creator of Dengeki Daisy)
- Natsumi Mukai (迎 夏生)
- Kenichi Muraeda (村枝 賢一)
- Glen Murakami
- Maki Murakami (村上 真紀) (creator of Gravitation)
- Motoka Murakami (村上 もとか)
- Range Murata (村田 蓮爾)
- Yusuke Murata (村田 雄介) (illustrator of Eyeshield 21 and One Punch Man)
- Wataru Murayama (村山 渉)

=== N ===
- Go Nagai (永井 豪) (creator of Devilman, Cutie Honey, Mazinger Z, Violence Jack and Getter Robo)
- Mamoru Nagano (永野 護)
- Shinji Nagashima (永島 慎二)
- Takeru Nagayoshi (永吉 たける)
- An Nakahara (中原 杏)
- Aya Nakahara (中原 アヤ) (creator of Love Com)
- Tsuyoshi Nakaima (なかいま 強)
- Hisaya Nakajo (中条 比紗也)
- Hikaru Nakamura (中村 光) (creator of Saint Young Men and Arakawa Under the Bridge)
- Shungiku Nakamura (中村 春菊) (creator of Junjou Romantica and Sekai-ichi Hatsukoi)
- Yoshiki Nakamura (仲村 佳樹) (creator of Skip Beat!)
- Nio Nakatani (仲谷 鳰) (creator of Bloom Into You)
- Keiji Nakazawa (中沢 啓治)
- Shingo Nanami (七海 慎吾)
- Kiriko Nananan (魚喃 キリコ)
- Aoi Nanase (七瀬 葵)
- Akira Narita (成田 アキラ)
- Hanaharu Naruko (鳴子 ハナハル)
- Yuri Narushima (なるしま ゆり)
- Yoshinori Natsume (夏目 義徳)
- Tsubaki Nekoi (猫井 椿)
- Nekojiru (ねこぢる)
- Yasuhiro Nightow (内藤 泰弘) (creator of Trigun and Blood Blockade Battlefront)
- Tsutomu Nihei (弐瓶 勉)
- Tomoko Ninomiya (二ノ宮 知子)
- Keiko Nishi (西 炯子)
- Yoshiyuki Nishi (西 義之)
- Hiroyuki Nishimori (西森 博之)
- Sou Nishimura (西村 宗)
- Youka Nitta
- Makoto Niwano (にわの まこと)
- Toshio Nobe (野部 利雄)
- Shinbo Nomura (のむら しんぼ)
- Eiji Nonaka (野中 英次)
- Charlie Nozawa

=== O ===
- Miho Obana (小花 美穂) (creator of Kodocha)
- Takeshi Obata (小畑 健) (co-creator of Death Note and Bakuman)
- Ochazukenori (御茶漬海苔)
- Eiichiro Oda (尾田 栄一郎) (creator of One Piece)
- Hideji Oda (小田 ひで次)
- Etsushi Ogawa (小川 悦司)
- Akane Ogura (小椋 アカネ)
- Saori Oguri (小栗 左多里)
- Tsuyoshi Ōhashi (大橋 ツヨシ)
- Tsugumi Ohba (大場 つぐみ) (co-creator of Death Note and Bakuman)
- Oh! great aka Ito Ogure (大暮 維人) (creator of Air Gear)
- Mineko Ohkami (押上 美猫)
- Nanase Ohkawa (大川 七瀬)
- Shinobu Ohtaka (大高 忍)
- Kendi Oiwa (大岩 ケンヂ)
- Oji Hiroi (広井 王子)
- Megumu Okada (岡田 芽武)
- Okama
- Lynn Okamoto (岡本 倫) (creator of Elfen Lied)
- Reiko Okano (岡野 玲子)
- Takeshi Okano (岡野 剛)
- Kyoko Okazaki (岡崎 京子)
- Mari Okazaki (おかざき 真里)
- Takashi Okazaki (岡崎 能士) (creator of Afro Samurai)
- Hiroya Oku (奥 浩哉) (creator of Gantz)
- Atsushi Ōkubo (大久保 篤) (creator of Soul Eater and Fire Force)
- Hitoshi Okuda (奥田 ひとし) (creator of Tenchi Muyo!)
- One (creator of One Punch Man, Mob Psycho 100 and Makai No Ossan)
- Hiromu Ono (小野 弥夢)
- Natsume Ono (オノ・ナツメ)
- Toshihiro Ono (小野 敏洋)
- Mamoru Oshii (押井 守)
- Towa Oshima (大島 永遠)
- Yasuichi Oshima (大島 やすいち)
- Yumiko Ōshima (大島 弓子)
- Katsuhiro Otomo (大友 克洋)
- Minami Ozaki (尾崎 南)
- Mari Ozawa (小沢 真理)
- Akira Oze (尾瀬 あきら)
- Makoto Ojiro (オジロ マコト)

=== R ===
- Marimo Ragawa (羅川 真里茂)
- Makoto Raiku (雷句 誠)
- Ryō Ramiya (蘭宮 涼)
- Rohan Kishibe (岸辺 露伴)
- Robico (ろびこ) (creator of My Little Mon
- Noboru Rokuda (六田 登)

=== S ===
- Yoshiyuki Sadamoto (貞本 義行)
- Fumi Saimon (柴門 ふみ)
- Chiho Saito (さいとう ちほ)
- Takao Saito (さいとう たかを)
- Rin Saitō (斉藤 倫)
- Mayu Sakai (酒井 まゆ)
- Yasuko Sakata (坂田 靖子)
- Harold Sakuishi (ハロルド 作石)
- Ashika Sakura (さくら あしか) (also writes under Sakurako Gokurakuin (極楽院櫻子)) (creator of Sensitive Pornograph and Sekirei)
- Momoko Sakura (さくら ももこ)
- Koharu Sakuraba (桜場 コハル)
- Kanoko Sakurakoji (桜小路 かのこ)
- Minene Sakurano (桜野 みねね)
- Erica Sakurazawa (桜沢 エリカ)
- Hiroaki Samura (沙村 広明)
- Riku Sanjo (三条 陸)
- Tetsuya Saruwatari (猿渡 哲也)
- Hiroshi Sasagawa (笹川 ひろし)
- Ryo Sasaki (佐々木 亮)
- Ayato Sasakura (笹倉 綾人)
- Daisuke Satō (佐藤 大輔) (co-creator of Highschool of the Dead)
- Shio Satō (佐藤 史生)
- Shōji Satō (佐藤 ショウジ) (co-creator of Highschool of the Dead)
- Shūhō Satō (佐藤 秀峰)
- Machiko Satonaka (里中 満智子)
- Yoshio Sawai (澤井 啓夫)
- Shizuru Seino (清野 静流)
- Kōji Seo (瀬尾 公治)
- Takako Shigematsu (しげまつ 貴子)
- Shuichi Shigeno (しげの 秀一)
- Hiroshi Shiibashi (椎橋 寛)
- Ayumi Shiina (椎名 あゆみ)
- Takashi Shiina (椎名 高志)
- Satoshi Shiki (士貴 智志)
- Mitsutoshi Shimabukuro (島袋 光年)
- Kazuhiko Shimamoto (島本 和彦)
- Reiko Shimizu (清水 玲子)
- Yuki Shimizu (志水 ゆき)
- Takako Shimura (志村 貴子)
- Rize Shinba (神葉 理世)
- Mayu Shinjo (新條 まゆ)
- Chie Shinohara (篠原 千絵) (creator of Red River)
- Tōru Shinohara (篠原 とおる)
- Mizuo Shinonome (東雲 水生)
- Hiromu Shinozuka (篠塚 ひろむ)
- Kaoru Shintani (新谷 かおる)
- Motoei Shinzawa (新沢 基栄)
- Etorouji Shiono (塩野 干支郎次)
- Yuji Shiozaki (塩崎 雄二)
- Kaiu Shirai (白井 カイウ) (co-creator of The Promised Neverland)
- Sanpei Shirato (白土 三平)
- Kotobuki Shiriagari (しりあがり 寿)
- Masamune Shirow (士郎 正宗)
- Yōko Shōji (庄司 陽子)
- Kouyu Shurei (珠黎 こうゆ)
- Smelly
- Masahito Soda (曽田 正人)
- Toshinori Sogabe (宗我部 としのり)
- Kenichi Sonoda (園田 健一)
- Mitsuyoshi Sonoda (園田 光慶)
- Hideaki Sorachi (空知 英秋) (creator of Gin Tama)
- Fuyumi Soryo (惣領 冬実)
- Keiko Suenobu (すえのぶ けいこ)
- Yuki Suetsugu (末次 由紀)
- Mitsuru Sugaya (すがや みつる)
- Ken Sugimori (杉森 建)
- Yukiru Sugisaki (杉崎 ゆきる) (creator of D.N. Angel)
- Hinako Sugiura (杉浦 日向子)
- Shigeru Sugiura (杉浦 茂)
- Shiho Sugiura (杉浦 志保)
- Natsuki Sumeragi (皇 なつき)
- Yukiko Sumiyoshi (住吉 文子)
- Jirō Suzuki (鈴木 次郎)
- Julietta Suzuki (鈴木 ジュリエッタ)
- Nakaba Suzuki (鈴木 央) (creator of The Seven Deadly Sins)
- Atsushi Suzumi (鈴見 敦)
- Karin Suzuragi (鈴羅木 かりん)

=== T ===
- Yūki Tabata (田畠 裕基) (creator of Black Clover)
- Higuchi Tachibana (樋口 橘)
- Yutaka Tachibana (橘 裕)
- Haruko Tachiiri (たちいり ハルコ)
- Megumi Tachikawa (立川 恵)
- Kaoru Tada (多田 かおる) (creator of Itazura na Kiss)
- Gengoroh Tagame (田亀 源五郎)
- Suihō Tagawa (田河 水泡)
- Akemi Takada (高田 明美)
- Rie Takada (高田 りえ)
- Yuzo Takada (高田 裕三)
- Nobuyuki Takagi (高木 信孝)
- Hiroshi Takahashi (高橋 ヒロシ)
- Kazuki Takahashi (高橋 和希) (creator of Yu-Gi-Oh!)
- Koji Takahashi (高橋 幸慈)
- Rumiko Takahashi (高橋 留美子) (creator of Ranma ½ and InuYasha)
- Shin Takahashi (高橋 しん)
- Tsutomu Takahashi (高橋 ツトム)
- Yoichi Takahashi (高橋 陽一)
- Yoshihiro Takahashi (高橋よしひろ)
- Yōsuke Takahashi (高橋 葉介)
- Ryo Takamisaki (鷹岬 諒)
- Hinako Takanaga (高永 ひなこ) (creator of The Tyrant Falls in Love)
- Mitsuba Takanashi (高梨 みつば)
- Shizue Takanashi (たかなし しずえ)
- Fumiko Takano (高野 文子)
- Ichigo Takano (高野 苺) (creator of Orange)
- Hiroshi Takashige (たかしげ 宙) (creator of Until Death Do Us Part)
- Kazusa Takashima (高嶋 上総)
- Misako Takashima, most known as Misako Rocks!
- Rica Takashima (高嶋 リカ) (creator of Rica 'tte Kanji!?)
- Natsuki Takaya (高屋 奈月) (creator of Fruits Basket)
- Yoshiki Takaya (高屋 良樹)
- Hiroyuki Takei (武井 宏之) (creator of Shaman King)
- Kentaro Takekuma (竹熊 健太郎)
- Keiko Takemiya (竹宮 惠子) (creator of various shōjo titles)
- Izumi Takemoto (竹本 泉)
- Mick Takeuchi (竹内未来)
- Naoko Takeuchi (武内 直子) (creator of Bishoujo Senshi Sailor Moon)
- Takashi Takeuchi (武内 崇) (illustrator of Fate/stay night)
- Hiroyuki Tamakoshi (玉越 博幸) (creator of Gacha Gacha)
- Ryūhei Tamura (田村 隆平) (creator of Beelzebub)
- Shigeru Tamura (田村 茂)
- Yumi Tamura (田村 由美)
- Yellow Tanabe (田辺 イエロウ) (Kekkaishi)
- Kunihiko Tanaka (田中 久仁彦)
- Masashi Tanaka (田中 政志)
- Arina Tanemura (種村 有菜) (creator of Full Moon o Sagashite and Kamikaze Kaito Jeanne)
- Tomoko Taniguchi (たにぐち 智子)
- Jirō Taniguchi (谷口 ジロー)
- Makoto Tateno (立野 真琴) (creator of Yellow and Ka Shin Fu)
- Retsu Tateo (館尾 冽) (illustrator of Full Metal Panic!)
- Yukinobu Tatsu (龍 幸伸) (creator of Dandadan)
- Yoshihiro Tatsumi (辰巳 ヨシヒロ)
- Katsuya Terada (寺田 克也)
- Yuji Terajima (寺嶋 裕二)
- Buichi Terasawa (寺沢 武一)
- Daisuke Terasawa (寺沢 大介)
- Reiko Terashima (寺島 令子)
- Yū Terashima (寺島 優)
- Takashi Teshirogi (てしろぎ たかし)
- Osamu Tezuka (手塚 治虫) (creator of Astro Boy and Jungle Taitei)
- Keiko Tobe (戸部 けいこ)
- Yana Toboso (枢 やな) (creator of Black Butler)
- Izumi Tōdō (東堂 いづみ)
- Yoshihiro Togashi (冨樫 義博) (creator of YuYu Hakusho and Hunter × Hunter)
- Hari Tokeino (時計野 はり) (creator of Me & My Brothers)
- Kōichi Tokita (ときた 洸一)
- Masaya Tokuhiro (徳弘 正也)
- Hitoshi Tomizawa (富沢 ひとし)
- Tono (との)
- Yoshiki Tonogai (外海 良基) (illustrator of Higurashi no Naku Koro ni)
- Tony Takezaki (トニーたけざき)
- Miki Tori (とり·みき)
- Akira Toriyama (鳥山 明) (creator of Dragon Ball and Dr. Slump)
- Kei Toume (冬目 景)
- Ema Tōyama (遠山 えま)
- Masami Tsuda (津田 雅美) (creator of Kare Kano)
- Mikiyo Tsuda (つだ みきよ) also writes yaoi under the name Taishi Zaō (蔵王大志 Zaō Taishi) (creator of Princess Princess)
- Yoshiharu Tsuge (つげ 義春)
- Yumi Tsukirino (つきりの ゆみ)
- Sakura Tsukuba (筑波 さくら) (creator of Penguin Revolution)
- Taku Tsumugi (紡木 たく)
- Yūko Tsuno (津野 裕子)
- Jirō Tsunoda (つのだ じろう)
- Tsunomaru (つの丸)
- Kenji Tsuruta (鶴田 謙二)
- Midorikawa Tsuyoshi (緑川毅志)

=== U ===
- Nozomi Uda (宇田希美)
- Shungicu Uchida (内田 春菊)
- Hajime Ueda (ウエダ ハジメ)
- Masashi Ueda (植田 まさし)
- Miwa Ueda (上田 美和) (creator of Peach Girl)
- Rinko Ueda (上田 倫子) (creator of Tail of the Moon)
- Toshiko Ueda (上田 トシコ)
- Kimiko Uehara (上原 きみ子)
- Riichi Ueshiba (植芝 理一)
- U-Jin (遊人)
- Haruto Umezawa (梅澤 春人)
- Kazuo Umezu (楳図 かずお)
- Chica Umino (羽海野 チカ)
- Akinobu Uraka (有楽 彰展)
- Kei Urana (裏那 圭) (creator of Gachiakuta)
- Naoki Urasawa (浦沢 直樹) (creator of 20th Century Boys and Monster)
- Yuki Urushibara (漆原 友紀)
- Satoshi Urushihara (うるし原 智志)
- Yoshito Usui (臼井 儀人)
- Kyosuke Usuta (うすた 京介)
- Hiroyuki Utatane (うたたね ひろゆき)

=== W ===
- Shinji Wada (和田 慎二)
- Tamiki Wakaki (若木 民喜)
- Ken Wakui (和久井 健)
- Masako Watanabe (わたなべ まさこ)
- Taeko Watanabe (渡辺 多恵子)
- Seizō Watase (わたせ せいぞう)
- Yuu Watase (渡瀬 悠宇)
- Kaworu Watashiya (私屋 カヲル)
- Nobuhiro Watsuki (和月 伸宏) (creator of Rurouni Kenshin)
- Wanyan Aguda (完顏阿骨打)

=== Y ===
- Yuu Yabuchi (やぶうち 優)
- Kentaro Yabuki (矢吹 健太朗) (creator of Black Cat and illustrator of To Love-Ru)
- Chitose Yagami (八神 千歳)
- Hiroki Yagami (八神 ひろき)
- Yu Yagami (矢上 裕)
- Norihiro Yagi (八木 教広)
- Kou Yaginuma (柳沼 行)
- Akihiro Yamada (山田 章博)
- J-ta Yamada (山田J太)
- Keiko Yamada (山田 圭子)
- Murasaki Yamada (やまだ 紫)
- Nanpei Yamada (山田 南平)
- Reiji Yamada (山田 玲司)
- Ryoko Yamagishi (山岸 凉子)
- Masakazu Yamaguchi (山口 譲司) (creator of Arm of Kannon)
- Tsubasa Yamaguchi (山口つばさ)
- Ebine Yamaji (やまねえびね)
- Hideo Yamamoto (山本 英夫)
- Naoki Yamamoto (山本 直樹)
- Satoshi Yamamoto (山本 サトシ)
- Sumika Yamamoto (山本 鈴美香)
- Yamato Yamamoto (山本 ヤマト)
- Yasuhito Yamamoto (山本 康人)
- Ayano Yamane (やまね あやの or 山根 綾乃)
- Jūzō Yamasaki (やまさき 十三)
- Ikuto Yamashita (山下 いくと)
- Kazumi Yamashita (山下 和美)
- Waki Yamato (大和 和紀)
- Housui Yamazaki (山崎 峰水)
- Kimio Yanagisawa (柳沢 きみお)
- Takashi Yanase (やなせ たかし)
- Kentarō Yano (矢野 健太郎)
- Yasu (ヤス)
- Suzuhito Yasuda (ヤスダ スズヒト)
- Yoshikazu Yasuhiko (安彦 良和)
- Kōichirō Yasunaga (安永 航一郞)
- Chao Yat
- Ai Yazawa (矢沢 あい)
- Nao Yazawa (谷沢 直)
- Mitsuteru Yokoyama (横山 光輝)
- Hideyuki Yonehara (米原 秀幸)
- Yoshihiro Yonezawa (米澤 嘉博)
- Akimi Yoshida (吉田 秋生)
- Tatsuo Yoshida (吉田 竜夫)
- Miki Yoshikawa (吉河 美希)
- Kagami Yoshimizu (美水 かがみ) (creator of Lucky☆Star)
- Fumi Yoshinaga (よしなが ふみ)
- Sakumi Yoshino (吉野 朔実)
- Akihito Yoshitomi (吉富 昭仁)
- Mine Yoshizaki (吉崎 観音)
- Seimu Yoshizaki (芳崎 せいむ)
- Wataru Yoshizumi (吉住 渉)
- Toshiki Yui (唯 登詩樹)
- Kaori Yuki (由貴 香織里)
- Masami Yuki (ゆうき まさみ)
- Nobuteru Yūki (結城 信輝)
- Yukiwo (ユキヲ)
- Makoto Yukimura (幸村 誠)
- Sumomo Yumeka (夢花 李)
- Tsutae Yuzu (つたえ ゆず)

== Groups ==
- Adachitoka (あだちとか) (creators of Noragami)
- Akira Himekawa (姫川 明 Himekawa Akira)
- Aida Iro (creators of Toilet-Bound Hanako-kun)
- Clamp (クランプ Kuranpu) (creators of Angelic Layer, Chobits and Cardcaptor Sakura)
- Fujio Fujiko (藤子 不二雄 Fujiko Fujio) (creators of Doraemon)
- Futago Kamikita (上北ふたご)
- Headgear (ヘッドギア)
- Kaishaku (介錯) (creators of Kannazuki no Miko and Shattered Angels)
- Mayumi Muroyama (室山 まゆみ)
- Peach-Pit (ピーチ・ピット Pīchi Pitto) (creators of DearS, Rozen Maiden, and Shugo Chara!)
- Year 24 Group (24年組 Nijūyo-nen Gumi)
- Yudetamago (ゆでたまご) (creators of Kinnikuman)
