= Bungeishunjū Manga Award =

Annual award by a Japanese publisher

Bungeishunjū Manga Award; 文藝春秋漫画賞
- Country: Japan
- Presented by: Bungeishunjū
- First award: 1955
- Final award: 2001

The Bungeishunjū Manga Award (文藝春秋漫画賞, Bungeishunjū Manga Shō) was an annual award established in 1955 and given out by Bungeishunjū in Japan for gag, yonkoma, one-panel, and satirical manga. The award was also given out for works considered the magnum opus of manga creators.

Past winners of the award include Jōji Yamafuji, Makoto Wada, illustrations by Taku Furukawa, a picture book by Shinto Chō, and parodies by Mad Amano. While the award was given out for illustration, picture books, parodies, and other similar works, the proliferation of the modern manga culture led to more manga artists receiving the awards in recent years.

Bungeishunjū stopped giving out the award in 2002.

== Award winners ==
#	Year	Artist	Work
1	1955	Rokurō Taniuchi	The Accidental Child (行ってしまった子, Okonatte Shimatta Ko)
2	1956	Yukio Sugiura	for his post-war satirical manga
3	1957	Yoshirō Katō	Yoshirō Best Manga Works Collection (芳郎傑作漫画集, Yoshirō Kessaku Manga Shū)
4	1958	Yōji Kuri	Kuri Yōji Manga Collection (久利洋次漫画集, Kuri Yōji Manga Shū)
5	1959	Shinta Chō	The Talking Tamagoyaki (おしゃべりなたまごやき, Oshaberi na Tamagoyaki)
6	1960	Kenji Ogiwara	for his historical manga
7	1961	Fuyuhiko Okabe	Acchan (アッちゃん) and Baby Gang (ベビー・ギャング, Bebī Gyangu)
8	1962	Machiko Hasegawa	Sazae-san
9	1963	Mitsuo Mutsuura	for reportage on copper-plate engraving
10	1964	Hidetoshi Umeda	Asahi Graph (series)
11	1965	Yōsuke Inoue	for his nonsense manga
12	1966	Sanpei Satō	Asakaze-kun (アサカゼ君) and Fuji Santarō (フジ三太郎)
12	1966	Kazu Kuroiwa	Eye for Eye
13	1967	Keiichi Makino	Keiichi Makino Manga Collection (牧野圭一漫画集, Makino Keiichi Manga Shū)
14	1968	Kō Kojima	Nihon no Kaa-chan (日本のおかあちゃん) and 7-8=1
15	1969	Makoto Wada	for his illustrative likenesses
15	1969	Yoshiji Suzuki	for his period manga and adult manga
16	1970	Sadao Shōji	Tanma-kun (タンマ君) and Shin Manga Bungaku Senshū (新漫画文学全集)
17	1971	Shōji Yamafuji	Chūshō (抽象), Erotopia (エロトピア), and Sesō Aburidashi (世相あぶり出し)
17	1971	Shigehisa Sunagawa	Yoraba Kiru (寄らば斬る), Jūbē (ジュウベー), and Tempura Western (テンプラウエスタン)
18	1972	Fujio Akatsuka	Tensai Bakabon (天才バカボン)
18	1972	Kunihiko Hisa	War: The Manga Annals of the Pacific Ocean (戦争-漫画太平洋戦史, Sensō: Manga Taiheiyō Senshi)
19	1973	Noboru Baba	Baku-san (バクさん) and 11-piki no Neko to Ahōdori (11ぴきのねことあほうどり)
19	1973	Haruo Kobayashi	Hitokuchi Manga (ヒトクチ漫画)
20	1974	Yū Takita	Enka Kyōkyakkei (怨歌橋百景) and others
20	1974	Tokū Ogura	Manga Postcard Gallery (マンガはがきギャラリー, Manga Hagaki Gyararī)
21	1975	Osamu Tezuka	Buddha (ブッダ, Budda) and Dōbutsu Tsurezure Sō (動物つれづれ草)
21	1975	Ryūzan Aki	Qh Jarīzu! (Qhジャリーズ!) and Nohhohon-san (ノッホホン氏)
22	1976	Shunji Sonoyama	Gyātoruzu (ギャートルズ) and others
22	1976	Hideo Takeda	Monmon (もんもん)
23	1977	Shigeo Fukuda	for humor manga derived from home life and toys
23	1977	Takao Kusahara	Midnight Lullaby (真夜中の子守歌, Mayonaka Komoriuta) and others
24	1978	Mad Amano	for his parody works combining photos with drawings
24	1978	Masahiro Nikaidō	Nikaidō Masahiro Ten (二階堂正宏展) and others
25	1979	Taku Furukawa	The Takun Humor (ザ・タクン・ユーモア, Za Takun Yūmoa)
25	1979	Akiyoshi Shimazoe	Ugoku Illust - Mokuzō Omocha (動くイラスト・木造玩具)
25	1979	Gajin Tokuno	Furenzokutai (不連続体)
26	1980	Shinsuke Maekawa	Nakamachi Ginza Shōtengai (中町銀座商店街)
27	1981	Ajin Noda	Paper Illustration (ペーパーイラストレーション, Pēpā Irasutorēshon)
27	1981	Tsunemi Kudō	Tsupparasāru Gakuen (ツッパラサール学園)
28	1982	Shin Yamada	for his political cartoons and other works
28	1982	Yamato Suzuki	Ai MY Tenrankai (哀MY展覧会)
28	1982	Masashi Ueda	Furiten-kun, Masashi-kun (まさし君), and Kariage-kun (かりあげクン)
29	1983	Yasuji Tanioka	for his nonsense and gag manga
29	1983	Iwao Hashimoto	Dotera Neko (どてらネコ)
30	1984	Haruo Takahashi	Iwayuru Hitotsu no Chō-san Shugi (いわゆるひとつのチョーさん主義) and Hyōkin Channel (ひょうきんチャンネル, Hyōkin Channeru)
30	1984	Tokutarō Chiba	Itoshi no Tanaka Kakuei-sama (いとしの田中角栄さま) and Hyōryū (漂流)
31	1985	Hisaichi Ishii	for his nonsense manga
31	1985	Sou Nishimura	Sarari-kun (サラリ君)
32	1986	No award given	
33	1987	Seizō Watase	Phillip, P.I. (私立探偵フィリップ, Shiritsu Tantei Firippu)
33	1987	Shigeki Andō	Yacchan no Kachi! (ヤッちゃんの勝ち!)
34	1988	Hinako Sugiura	Fūryū Edo Suzume (風流江戸雀)
35	1989	Katsuhiko Hotta	Obatarian
36	1990	Satoshi Kozuki	Parano Tengoku (パラノ天国)
36	1990	Kojirō	Buttama Gerira (ぶったまゲリラ)
37	1991	Sensha Yoshida	Utsurun Desu. (伝染るんです。)
38	1992	Hisashi Eguchi	Hisashi Eguchi's Dynamite Dinner Show (江口寿史の爆発ディナーショー, Eguchi Hisashi no Bakuhatsu Dinā Shō)
38	1992	Tatsuya Nakazaki	Problem Salaryman (問題サラリーMAN, Mondai Sarariman)
39	1993	No award given	
40	1994	Keisuke Yamashina	C-class Salaryman Course (C級さらりーまん講座, Shīkyū Sarariman Kōza) and Chūryū Zukan (中流図鑑)
41	1995	Miki Tori	Tōku e Ikitai (遠くへいきたい)
42	1996	Eiko Kera	Atashin'chi
42	1996	Mitsuru Yaku	Yaku Mitsuru no Sanmen Manga (やくみつるの三面マンガ) and Oni no Yaku Medama (オニのやく目玉)
43	1997	Hiroshi Kurogane	Shinsengumi (新撰組)
43	1997	Rieko Saibara	Bokunchi (ぼくんち)
44	1998	Sunao Hari	for his illustrative likenesses
44	1998	Tsuyoshi Ōhashi	Kaishain no Melody
45	1999	Yoshihiro Koizumi	Buddha and Shittaka Buddha (ブッダとシッタカブッダ, Budda to Shittaka Budda)
45	1999	Q.B.B.	Junior High Student Diary (中学生日記, Chūgakusei Nikki)
46	2000	Kotobuki Shiriagari	Jiji Oyaji 2000 (時事おやじ2000) and Yuruyuru Oyaji (ゆるゆるおやじ)
46	2000	Nawoki Karasawa	Dennōen (電脳炎)
47	2001	Dragon Odawara	Kogal Sushi (コギャル寿司, Kogyaru Sushi)
47	2001	Akihiro Kikuchi	Mekappi Kibochimaru (メカッピキポチ丸)

== See also ==
- List of manga awards
