= Rin (given name) =

- Gender: All

Origin
- Origin: Japanese
- Meaning: Different meanings depending on the kanji used: 倫 ethics 凛 dignified 臨 meet 琳 jewel 燐 phosphorus 綸 thread, silk thread 鈴 bell 林 woods, grove 麟 bright, chinese giraffe

Rin (written: 倫, 凛, 臨, 琳, 燐, 綸, 凜, 鈴, 林, 麟, りん in hiragana or リン in katakana) is a unisex Japanese given name, sometimes transliterated as Lin or Lynn. Notable people with the name include:

- Rin (りん; born 2001), member of Japanese idol group Atarashii Gakko!
- Rin Aira (逢来 りん; born 2002), Japanese voice actress
- Rin Aoki (青木 りん; born 1985), Japanese model and AV actress
- Rin Arakawa (荒川 麟; born 1999), Japanese racing driver
- Rin Asuka (飛鳥 凛; born 1991), Japanese actress
- Rin Chupeco, Chinese Filipino writer of young adult fiction
- Rin Emasu (江益 凛; born 1995), Japanese actress and model
- Rin Hashisako (橋迫 鈴; born 2005), Japanese member of the idol girl group Angerme
- Rin Honoka (ほのか りん; born 1996), Japanese fashion model, actress and television personality
- Rin Ishigaki (石垣 りん; 1920–2004), Japanese poet
- Rin Iwanaga (岩永 鈴; born 1999), Japanese badminton player
- Rin Kadokura (門倉 凛; born 1993), Japanese professional wrestler
- Rin Kawana (川名 凜; born 2003), Japanese member of the idol girl group Angerme
- Rin Keys (born 2008), American rhythmic gymnast
- Rin Kono (河野 臨; born 1981), Japanese Go player
- Rin Kubo (久保 凛; born 2008), Japanese athlete
- Rin Kusumi (久住 琳), Japanese voice actress
- Rin Maeda (前田凛; born 2005), Japanese judoka
- Rin Miyaji (宮道 りん; born 2000), Japanese freestyle wrestler
- Rin Nakai (中井 りん; born 1986), Japanese professional mixed martial artist
- Rin Nitaya (新田谷 凜; born 1997), Japanese figure skater
- Rin Okabe (岡部 凛; born 1996), member of Japanese idol group AKB48
- Lynn Okamoto (岡本 倫), Japanese manga artist
- Rin Saitō (斉藤 倫), Japanese manga artist
- Rin Sakuragi (桜木 凛; born 1989), Japanese former AV actress and talent
- Rin Shin (りんしん), Japanese character designer, animator and illustrator
- Rin Sumida (隅田 凜; born 1996), Japanese women's footballer
- Rin Takanashi (高梨 臨; born 1988), Japanese actress
- Rin Usami (宇佐見 りん; born 1999), Japanese novelist
- Rin Yamashita (山下 りん; 1857–1939), Japanese painter
- Rin Kaiho (林海峰; born 1942), Taiwanese professional Go player
- Rin Seikō (林 世功; 1842–1880), Japanese scholar-bureaucrat and diplomat

== Fictional characters ==
- Rin, a character in the dating sim Bunny Garden
- Rin, a supporting character in the music video game Cytus II
- Rin (凛), a main character in the music video Shelter
- Rin (リン), a character in the video game Catherine: Full Body
- Rin (りん), a supporting character in the manga series Inuyasha
- Rin (リン), protagonist of the anime series Lost Song
- Rin (リン), a character in the anime series Yu-Gi-Oh! Arc-V
- Rin, the protagonist of Tong Nou and Chu-Teng
- Rin Asano (浅野 凛), a character in the manga series Blade of the Immortal
- Rin Asogi (麻生祇 燐), protagonist of the anime series Mnemosyne
- Rin Baio (灰尾 凛), a character in the manga and anime series The 100 Girlfriends Who Really, Really, Really, Really, Really Love You
- Rin Fudo, a supporting character from Mission: Yozakura Family
- Rin Haruka (遥 鈴), a character in the anime series Machine Robo Rescue
- Rin Hashima (羽島 リン), a character in the anime series Cardfight!! Vanguard G
- Rin Hoshizora (星空 凛), a character in the anime series Love Live! School Idol Project
- Rin Itoshi (糸師 凛), a character in the manga series Blue Lock
- Rin Kaenbyou (火焔猫 燐), a character in Subterranean Animism from the Touhou Project series
- Rin Kaga (鹿賀 りん), a character in the manga series Bunny Drop
- Rin Kagamine (鏡音 リン), a character presented by Crypton Future Media, Inc. as part of its singing voice synthesis product offerings
- Rin Kagawa (香川 凛), a supporting character in When Will Ayumu Make His Move?
- Rin Kokonoe (九重 りん), a character in the manga series Kodomo no Jikan
- Rin Kujō (九条 凛), a character in the manga series To Love-Ru
- Rin Kusakabe (日下部 綸), a character in the anime series Accel World
- Rin Matsuoka (松岡 凛), a character in the anime series Free!
- Rin Nanagami (七神リン), a character in the role-playing game Blue Archive
- Rin Natsuki (夏木 りん), a character in the anime series Yes! PreCure 5
- Rin Natsume (棗 鈴), a character in the visual novel Little Busters!
- Rin Nohara (のはら リン), a character in the manga series Naruto
- Rin Okumura (奥村 燐), protagonist of the manga series Blue Exorcist
- Rin Sakyō (左京 鈴), a character in the tokusatsu series Magic Bullet Chronicles Ryukendo
- Rin Shibuya (渋谷凛), a character in the video game The Idolmaster Cinderella Girls
- Rin Shima (志摩 リン), one of the protagonists of the anime series Laid-Back Camp
- Rin Sohma (草摩 依鈴), a nickname for Isuzu Sohma, a character in the manga series Fruits Basket
- Rin Tezuka (手塚 琳), a character in the visual novel Katawa Shoujo
- Rin Tohsaka (遠坂 凛), a character in the visual novel Fate/stay night
- Rin Tokikaze (刻風 凛), a character in the video game Akiba's Trip: Undead & Undressed
- Rin Toyama (遠山 りん), a character in the anime series New Game!
- Rin Tsuchimi (土見 稟), protagonist of the visual novel Shuffle!
