= Ōhashi =

Ōhashi, Ohashi or Oohashi (written: 大橋 lit. "large bridge") is a Japanese surname. Notable people with the surname include:

- Akira Ohashi (born 1968), Japanese actor
- Ayaka Ohashi (born 1994), Japanese voice actress
- Hideyuki Ohashi (born 1965), former Japanese professional boxer
- Hiroyoshi Ohashi (born 1936), botanist formerly at the University of Tokyo and Tohoku University
- Katelyn Ohashi (born 1997), American artistic gymnast
- Kenichirō Ōhashi (born 1982), Japanese voice actor, and singer
- Kenzo Ohashi (born 1934), former Japanese football player
- Kyosen Ōhashi (born 1934), Japanese TV host and writer
- Masaharu Ōhashi (born 1947), Justice of the Supreme Court of Japan
- Masahiro Ohashi (born 1981), Japanese football player
- Mayumi Ōhashi (born 1966), Japanese manga artist
- Nozomi Ohashi (born 1999), retired Japanese child actress and singer
- Rene Ohashi, Canadian cinematographer
- Takahiro Ōhashi, Japanese shogi player
- Tsutomu Ōhashi (born 1933), Japanese artist and scientist
- Tsuyoshi Ōhashi (born 1972), Japanese manga artist
- Yui Ohashi (大橋 悠依; born 1995), Japanese swimmer
- Yuki Ohashi (born 1996), Japanese football player

== See also ==
- Sanjō Ōhashi, a bridge in Kyoto
