= 未央 =

未央 may refer to:

== Given name ==
- Mio Matsumura (松村 未央, born 1986), Japanese female announcer
- Mio Otani (大谷 未央, born 1979), Japanese footballer
- Takaya Miou (高屋 未央), Japanese manga artist

=== Fictional characters ===
- Mio (未央), a character in the manga series Dororo
- Mio (未央), a character in the manga series Needless
- Mio Honda (本田 未央), a character in the media franchise The Idolmaster
- Mio Ogata (緒方 未央), a character in the visual novel HoneyComing
- Mio Sawada (沢田 未央), a character in the manga series To Love Ru
- Li Weiyoung (李未央, Li Weiyang), character origined from Empress Dowager Feng in the Chinese television series The Princess Weiyoung

== Other uses ==
- Weiyang District, Xi'an, Shaanxi Province, People's Republic of China
- Weiyang Palace, imperial palace of the Han dynasty
