= Tokihiko =

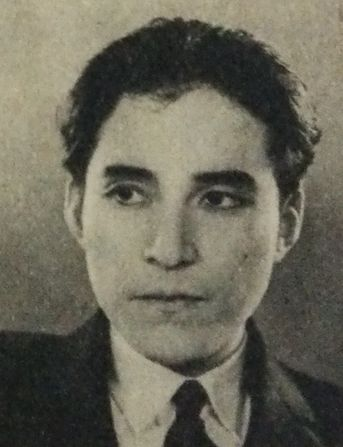
- Tokihiko Okada (1903–1934), Japanese silent film actor
- Pronunciation: tokʲiçiko (IPA)
- Gender: Male

Origin
- Origin: Japanese
- Meaning: Different meanings depending on the kanji used

Tokihiko is a masculine Japanese given name.

== Written forms ==
Tokihiko can be written using different combinations of kanji characters. Some examples:

- 時彦, "hour, elegant boy"
- 時比古, "hour, young man (archaic)"
- 刻彦, "engrave, elegant boy"
- 晨彦, "morning, elegant boy"
- 期彦, "period, elegant boy"
- 登喜彦, "climb up, rejoice, elegant boy"
- 登紀彦, "climb up, chronicle, elegant boy"

The name can also be written in hiragana ときひこ or katakana トキヒコ.

== Notable people with the name ==
- Tokihiko Higuchi (樋口 時彦; born 1941), Japanese volleyball player
- Tokihiko Matsuura (松浦 聡彦; born 1968), Japanese manga artist
- Tokihiko Okada (岡田 時彦; 1903–1934), Japanese silent film actor
