= Watase =

Watase (written: 渡瀬) is a Japanese surname. Notable people with the surname include:

- Ayumi Watase (渡瀬 あゆみ, born 1984), Japanese ski jumper
- Mizuki Watase (渡瀬 瑞基, born 1991), Japanese professional wrestler
- Seizō Watase (渡瀬 政造, born 1945), Japanese manga artist and illustrator
- Soichiro Watase (渡瀬 草一郎, born 1978), Japanese writer
- Tsunehiko Watase (渡瀬 恒彦, 1944–2017), Japanese actor
- Yuta Watase (渡瀬 雄太, born 1982), Japanese ski jumper
- Yuu Watase (渡瀬 悠宇, born 1970), Japanese manga artist

== Fictional characters ==
- Aoba Watase (渡瀬 青葉), protagonist of the anime series Buddy Complex
- Asuna Watase (渡瀬 明日菜), protagonist of the anime film Children Who Chase Lost Voices
- Sanetoshi Watase (渡瀬 眞悧), a character in the anime series Mawaru Penguindrum
- Masaru Watase (渡瀬 勝), a character in the video game series Yakuza/Like a Dragon
