= Sanpei Satō =

Japanese manga artist (1929-2021)

- サトウサンペイ
- Born: Yukikazu Satō (佐藤幸一); September 11, 1929; Nagoya, Aichi Prefecture, Empire of Japan
- Died: July 31, 2021 (aged 91); Tachikawa, Tokyo, Japan
- Years active: 1953-2021
- Notable work: Dotanba's Manners; Fuji Santarō
- Awards: Medal of Honor (Japan); Order of the Rising Sun; Tokyo Metropolitan Cultural Honor Award; Japan Cartoonists Association Award; Bungeishunjū Manga Award

Sanpei Satō (サトウサンペイ, Satō Sanpei; 11 September 1929 - 31 July 2021) was a Japanese manga artist best known for salaryman manga such as Fuji Santarō and Dotanba's Manners. He was born as Yukikazu Satō (佐藤 幸一, Satō Yukikazu) in Nagoya, but grew up from a young age in Ōsaka after his father built and managed a clock manufacturing plant there as part of the family business. When Satō was in junior high, he worked at a munitions plant during World War II.

After studying dyeing at Kyoto Technical College, he was hired at Daimaru where he started in clothing sales and quickly moved into advertising department. In 1953, he made his manga debut in the Shin Ōsaka newspaper. Only four years later, he quit his job at Daimaru in order to work full time as a manga artist. He moved to Tokyo in 1961.

Both Satō and his works have received multiple awards and recognition, including the Bungeishunjū Manga Award in 1966, the Tokyo Metropolitan Cultural Honor Award in 1991, the Medal of Honor from the Emperor of Japan in 1997, the Order of the Rising Sun in 1996, and the Special Award at the Japan Cartoonists Association Awards in 2017.

Satō died in 2021 from aspiration pneumonia at age 91.

== Biography ==
Yukikazu Satō was born on 11 September 1929 in Nagoya in Aichi Prefecture in the Empire of Japan. His extended family owned Satō Clock (佐藤時計製作所, Satō Kurokku), a clock manufacturing and sales company. His father was assigned to build and manage a new manufacturing plant and office in Ōsaka, so the family moved to Tennōji-ku when Satō was between 3 months and 2 years old. (Note: Sources differ on how old he was when he moved to Ōsaka.)

While growing up, he enjoyed manga such as Tank Tankuro and Norakuro. Satō became skilled at drawing, and was selected to enter a drawing contest in Ōsaka. While attending Ikuno Junior High School, was conscripted and put to work at a munitions manufacturing plant where he worked on a lathe creating shells for anti-aircraft guns.

After junior high school, he wanted to pursue painting and enroll in the Imperial Art School by taking advantage of a special post-war exemption that allowed entering a technical school instead of high school. His father objected, and rationing and post-war scarcity forced him to instead study dyeing at Kyoto Technical College (now Kyoto Institute of Technology). While attending school there, Satō became a fan of the Yaneura 3-chan manga by Shōtarō Nanbu. He later became friends with Nanbu and joined a Kansai-area manga group with Nanbu.

After graduating from Kyoto Technical College, one of Satō's professors introduced him to the advertising manager at Daimaru. He interviewed for the job, but the advertising manager lost his resumé. Because he was unable to take the exam required for the job, he instead submitted a comic detailing his previous experience, which got him the job. He started in sales in the women's clothing department before moving into the advertising department, where he worked on newspaper advertisement layout and copywriting.

At some point, the manga he wrote to replace his resume found its way to someone at the Shin Ōsaka newspaper, and he made his manga debut in 1953 with the yonkoma manga Son of Ōsaka (大阪の息子, Ōsaka no Musuko). He chose his pen name, "Sanpei", because he didn't think he would ever be as good as Okamoto Ippei. While working at Daimaru, high school student and future manga artist Sou Nishimura would sometimes visit Satō at work asking for advice. After working on his manga part-time for a few years, Satō quit his job at Daimaru in 1957 and started working on his manga full time.

Satō moved to Tokyo in 1961, beginning his Instant Madame (インスタントマダム, Insutanto Madamu) series that year in the Sankei Shimbun evening edition. He began serializing Fuji Santarō in The Asahi Shimbun in 1965, and he won the Bungeishunjū Manga Award in 1966 for Asakaze-kun and Fuji Santarō. The latter ran for 26 years until ending in 1991.

The Tokyo Metropolitan Government honored Satō in 1991 with the Tokyo Metropolitan Cultural Honor Award. The Emperor of Japan, Akihito, presented the Medal of Honor with a Purple Ribbon to him in 1997 for his contributions to the arts. In 2006, he received the Order of the Rising Sun 4th class, Gold Rays with Rosette from the government of Japan. The Japan Cartoonists Association recognized his complete body of work in 2017 with the Special Award at the Japan Cartoonists Association Awards.

Satō died in a Tokyo hospital on 31 July 2021 from aspiration pneumonia at age 91.

== Works ==
Works are listed chronologically, from oldest to newest.

=== Manga ===
- Son of Ōsaka (serialized in Shin Ōsaka in 1953)
- Ossu Messu (serialized in Sankei Sports in 1957)
- Instant Madame (serialized in the Sankei Shimbun evening edition from 1961–1965)
- Asakaze-kun (serialized in Manga Sunday from 1963–1965)
- Fuji Santarō (serialized in The Asahi Shimbun from 1965–1991)
- Lunch-kun (serialized in Heibon Punch from 1965–1968)
- Hanabē (serialized in Shūkan Bunshun from 1966–1967)
- Sukatan Company (serialized in The Sunday Mainichi from 1967–1974)
- Yūhi-kun (serialized in Shūkan Asahi from 1968–1985)
- Dotanba's Manners (one volume, March 1982, Shinchōsha, ISBN 4101265011)
  - The Stylish Japanese: Dotanba's Manners Foreign Edition (February 1986, Shinchōsha, ISBN 4101265046)

== Awards and recognition ==
Satō received numerous awards over the course of his career.

Year	Organization	Award title, category	Work	Result	Ref.
1966	Bungeishunjū	Bungeishunjū Manga Award	Asakaze-kun; Fuji Santarō	Won	
1991	Tokyo Metropolitan Government	Tokyo Metropolitan Cultural Honor Award	-	Awarded	
1997	Akihito, Emperor of Japan	Medal of Honor, Purple Ribbon	-	Awarded	
2006	Government of Japan	Order of the Rising Sun, Gold Rays with Rosette	-	Awarded	
2017	Japan Cartoonists Association	Japan Cartoonists Association Award, Special Award	For his full body of work	Won	
