= Kotonoha =

Kotonoha is Japanese for word, language, or waka. It may also refer to:

- Kotonoha Katsura, a female main character in the fiction School Days (visual novel)
- Kotonoha, a scanlation group
- Kotonoha (website), a discussion forum website
- Kotonoha (Chitose Hajime album), a 2001 mini album by Chitose Hajime
- Kotonoha (Kokia album), a 2010 extended play album by Kokia
- Kotonoha, a fictional world that appears in works by Ryo Sasaki
