= Akira Narita =

Japanese manga artist (born 1945)

Akira Narita (born April 9, 1945, in Karatsu, Saga) is a Japanese manga artist best known for writing about his experiences with the Japanese telekura (telephone club) industry.

== See also ==
- List of manga artists
