= Rin! =

Japanese manga

凛！
- Genre: Yaoi
- Manga
- Written by: Satoru Kannagi
- Illustrated by: Yukine Honami
- Published by: Tokuma Shoten
- English publisher: NA: Digital Manga Publishing
- Original run: December 12, 2002 – October 25, 2004
- Volumes: 3

Rin! (凛！) is a Japanese manga written by Satoru Kannagi and illustrated by Yukine Honami. It is licensed in North America by Digital Manga Publishing, which released the manga between October 25, 2006, and April 25, 2007. It is licensed in German by Carlsen Verlag.

== Characters ==
Katsura The main character of Rin! A high school junior and a 2-dan in archery. Katsura struggles with an unusual form of anxiety that can only be soothed by his 'secret weapon'.

Sou The vice-president of the archery club and a senior in high school. He is Katsura's 'secret weapon' by giving him a hug to calm down all fears and anxieties. His bow is very free and flexible.

Yamato The president of the archery club and Katsura's older brother. His bow is stronger and more rigid, because of his extensive physical and mental training. Sou is his best friend and he cares very deeply for his younger brother, Katsura. He is serious about his archery and is a good listener.

== Reception ==
Patricia Beard felt that the character designs were too young-looking, and regarded the second volume as "something to read while I look at Honami's wonderful artwork", and felt the final volume was "disjointed" in its narrative. Holly Ellingwood enjoyed "the metaphor of archery forms to that of life and love", which she felt lent the work "a greater spiritual depth". Sylvia Einenkel describes the archery motif as being "unforgettable".
