= Constellations in My Palm =

Japanese manga series

てのひらの星座 (Tenohira no Seiza)
- Genre: Yaoi
- Manga
- Written by: Chisako Sakuragi
- Illustrated by: Yukine Honami
- Published by: Tokuma Shoten
- English publisher: NA: Digital Manga Publishing
- Published: November 25, 2005

Constellations in My Palm (てのひらの星座, Tenohira no Seiza) is a manga written by Chisako Sakuragi and illustrated by Yukine Honami. It is published in English by Digital Manga Publishing, and in German by Carlsen Manga.

== Reception ==
Ariadne Roberts, writing for Mania Entertainment, was relieved that the bisexual best friend of the protagonist was a confidant, not a love-rival, and felt the length of the volume helped the author create realistic characters. Holly Ellingwood, writing for Active Anime, found the story "lovely, subtle and beautifully romantic".
