= Haruo Takahashi =

Japanese manga artist (1947–2024)

Haruo Takahashi 高橋春男
- Born: March 30, 1947 Hachiōji, Tokyo, Japan
- Died: January 12, 2024 (aged 76) Sagamihara, Kanagawa Prefecture, Japan
- Areas: Manga artist, Animator
- Notable works: Silver Fang; Tiger Mask

Haruo Takahashi (Japanese: 高橋春男, Hepburn: Haruo Takahashi; March 30, 1947 – January 12, 2024) was a Japanese manga artist and animator.

Takahashi was known for working on Tiger Mask, Silver Fang and Inspector Gadget. In 1984, he won the 30th Bungei Shunju Manga Award for "Cho-san Ism".
