= Can't Win with You! =

Japanese manga series

- Cover of Can't Win With You! volume 1 as published by Houbunsha

きみには勝てない! (Kimi ni wa Katenai!)
- Genre: Yaoi
- Manga
- Written by: Satosumi Takaguchi
- Illustrated by: Yukine Honami
- Published by: Houbunsha
- English publisher: NA: Digital Manga Publishing
- Original run: April 2003 – April 28, 2004
- Volumes: 3

Can't Win With You! (Japanese: きみには勝てない!, Hepburn: Kimi ni wa Katenai!; aka. "High School Nights") is a Japanese manga written by Satosumi Takaguchi and illustrated by Yukine Honami. It is licensed in North America by Digital Manga Publishing, which released the manga's three bound volumes through its imprint, Juné, between August 15, 2007 and March 11, 2008. The manga is licensed in Germany as High School Nights by Tokyopop Germany. Houbunsha releases the manga three tankōbon volumes between April 2003 and April 28, 2004.

== Media ==
=== Volume list ===
No.	Original release date	Original ISBN	North American release date	North American ISBN
01	April 2003	978-4-8322-8246-9	August 15, 2007	978-1-5697-0812-5
02	November 28, 2003	978-4-8322-8275-9	November 15, 2007	978-1-5697-0819-4
03	April 28, 2004	978-4-8322-8292-6	March 28, 2008	978-1-5697-0821-7

== Reception ==
Mania.com's Patricia Beard comments on the minimalism of Honami's artwork, saying that the artist uses "only enough background art to place a scene and her panels flow well". ActiveAnime's Holly Ellingwood commends the manga for its "surprising depth, diverse characters, involving storylines, and an irresistible art style". Leroy Douresseaux comments that the manga is "more or less a comic romp with bickering boys, and the love is less lust than it is lovey-dovey" despite its yaoi genre. Mania's Patricia Beard finds the relationship between Miki and Houjou to be the best developed and most emotionally satisfying, and noted that the potentially offensive "aggressive sexual dynamics" of the school are toned down in the second volume.
