= At 30, I Realized I Had No Gender =

2023 autobiographical manga by Shou Arai

- Author: Shou Arai
- Language: Japanese
- Genre: Autobiography, Manga
- Publisher: Tokyopop
- Publication place: Japan

At 30, I Realized I Had No Gender is a Japanese autobiographical manga by Shou Arai, originally published in 2023.

== Plot ==
The manga is Arai's autobiography. Arai lived the first 30 years of his life as a woman. This caused him deep discomfort, until he transitioned and found out that he was also intersex. He uses he/him pronouns in English.

By the title's publication date, he was living comfortably with his boyfriend. Apart from serving as a biography, the manga also tries to answer questions that readers might have about the lives of LGBTQ people in Japan.

== Development ==
Arai said that he considered works like this to be of particular importance because they represent older trans characters, in contrast to the stereotype in literature of depicting trans characters as young people. He wanted to show readers that trans people could also lead happy lives and grow old. He stated that the manga was in no way an exception to the long tradition in the medium of representing LGBT characters in Japan, though it might have been less common in the past for these stories to be told by queer people themselves.

== Reception ==
Sophie Layton, writing for Forge Press, praised the warmth and honesty of the manga, stating that it did not seek to lecture readers but simply to share the author's own intersex experiences, while also highlighting how uncommon these types of stories remain even within LGBTQ literature.
