= My Girlfriend's a Geek =

Novel, manga, film

- Cover of the first My Girlfriend's a Geek light novel

腐女子彼女。 (Fujoshi Kanojo.)
- Genre: Comedy, Romance, Slice of life
- Light novel
- Written by: Pentabu
- Published by: Enterbrain
- English publisher: NA: Yen Press
- Original run: December 8, 2006 – August 1, 2007
- Volumes: 2
- Manga
- Written by: Pentabu
- Illustrated by: Rize Shinba
- Published by: Enterbrain
- English publisher: NA: Yen Press
- Magazine: B's LOG Comic
- Original run: December 1, 2007 – March 1, 2010
- Volumes: 5
- Live-action film
- Directed by: Atsushi Kaneshige
- Produced by: Enterbrain
- Written by: Ei Katsuragi
- Released: May 2, 2009

My Girlfriend's a Geek (腐女子彼女, Fujoshi Kanojo) is a Japanese light novel series in two volumes by Pentabu based on a popular blog of the same name with 11 million page views. A manga adaptation by Rize Shinba started serialization in 2007 and was published by Enterbrain under their B's LOG Comic imprint. A movie adaptation was published in 2009 with My Geeky Girlfriend as the International English title. Both the light novel and manga have been licensed for release by Yen Press.

== Story synopsis ==
The story is about the misadventures of a college student, who was falling in love with a pretty girl two years his senior, while in a part-time job, only to find out his girlfriend is a hard-core yaoi fangirl, and so his torment begins.

== Media ==
=== Novels ===
The novels contains blog entries of the blog with the same name from 2005 to 2007.

No.	Original release date	Original ISBN	English release date	English ISBN
01	December 8, 2006	978-4-7577-3059-5	September 28, 2010	978-0-7595-3171-0
02	August 1, 2007	978-4-7577-3664-1	March 29, 2011	978-0-7595-3172-7

=== Manga ===
In December 2007, Enterbrain published the first volume of the manga adaptation created by Rize Shinba in its B's LOG Comics imprint. The fourth volume was released in April 2009. The manga has been translated into Chinese, German, English and French; in Germany, it is published as Akihabara Shōjo.

No.	Original release date	Original ISBN	English release date	English ISBN
01	December 1, 2007	978-4-7577-3899-7	May 18, 2010	978-0-7595-3173-4
02	March 31, 2008	978-4-7577-4111-9	November 30, 2010	978-0-7595-3174-1
03	November 1, 2008	978-4-7577-4531-5	May 31, 2011	978-0-316-17821-1
04	April 1, 2009	978-4-7577-4811-8	September 20, 2011	978-0-316-17822-8
05	March 1, 2010	978-4-04-726379-6	December 13, 2011	978-0-316-17825-9

=== Film ===
The live action film was released in Japan's theaters in May 2009. It was directed by Atsushi Kaneshige, with screenplay written by Ei Katsuragi.
