= Tuxedo Gin =

Japanese manga series by Tokihiko Matsuura

- First tankōbon volume cover

タキシード銀 (Takishīdo Gin)
- Genre: Romantic comedy; Science fiction
- Manga
- Written by: Tokihiko Matsuura
- Published by: Shogakukan
- English publisher: NA: Viz Media
- Imprint: Shōnen Sunday Comics
- Magazine: Weekly Shōnen Sunday
- Original run: March 26, 1997 – January 29, 2000
- Volumes: 15

Tuxedo Gin (Japanese: タキシード銀, Hepburn: Takishīdo Gin) is a Japanese manga series written and illustrated by Tokihiko Matsuura. It was published in Shogakukan's Weekly Shōnen Sunday from 1997 to 2000, with its chapters collected in 15 tankōbon volumes. In North America, it was licensed for English released by Viz Media. The series is about a teenaged boxer named Ginji Kusanagi who is reincarnated as a penguin in order to be close to the girl he likes. On August 4, 2011, Walt Disney Pictures and Viz Pictures announced they were adapting the Tuxedo Gin manga into a feature film under the name, Tux.

== Plot ==
At the start of the series, Ginji Kusanagi (草薙 銀次, Kusanagi Ginji), a high school student on the verge of making his professional debut as a boxer, is killed in a suspicious motorcycle accident on his way to his first date with Minako Sasebo (佐瀬保 美奈子, Sasebo Minako), the girl of his dreams. An angel (who is depicted as a Buddhist monk with cherub wings and halo) tells Ginji that because of a celestial mistake, he can be reunited with Minako, but only if he lives out the natural lifespan of another animal, after which he will return to his human body. Remembering Minako's love for penguins, Ginji decides to be reincarnated as an Adelie penguin, and he hatches from an egg in a Tokyo aquarium.

When Ginji reaches adolescence, he escapes from the aquarium with his penguin friends, only to discover he cannot swim. He washes up in the harbor, where he is discovered by Minako. She takes him home and names him Gin-chan (at first thinking this to be an affectionate contraction of his own name, Ginji is crestfallen when Minako reveals that she has selected this name because, in her words, "You're such a cute little pengin! (ペンギン; the Japanese pronunciation of "penguin")".

The series depicts Ginji's life with Minako, where he does his best to protect Minako from any man who tries to go out with her or simply "harm" her. Along the way, Mike and the other penguins from the aquarium help him once in a while and he meets fellow reincarnated humans.

In the final arc, Minako is kidnapped by a murderous criminal named Kurosaki and Ginji goes and rescues her, but at the cost of losing his ability to fully reincarnate. Minako loses her memory and believes that Gin-chan headed back to the North Pole to be with his kind. The angel, becoming sympathetic to Ginji's ordeal, makes a plea to God to give up his form so that Ginji can be brought back to life. Ginji reunites with a relieved Minako and they become a couple while adopting a penguin named Popo whom Ginji had befriended earlier.

== Publication ==
Written and illustrated by Tokihiko Matsuura, Tuxedo Gin was serialized in Shogakukan's shōnen manga magazine Weekly Shōnen Sunday from March 26, 1997, to January 29, 2000. Shogakukan collected its chapters in 15 tankōbon volumes, released from September 18, 1997, to April 18, 2000.

It was published in North America by Viz Media.

=== Volumes ===
No.	Original release date	Original ISBN	English release date	English ISBN
1	September 18, 1997	978-4-09-125291-3	July 16, 2003	978-1-5911-6071-7
1. "First Love" (初恋); 2. "Drifting" (流されて…); 3. "Friends" (仲間!?); 4. "The Power of Love" (愛ってすごい。); 5. "What a Man's Gotta Do" (オトコなら…!!); 6. "The Wrong Attitude" (違うぞ、銀次。); 7. "Minako, Where Are You?" (その日、美奈子さんは…)
2	December 10, 1997	978-4-09-125292-0	September 10, 2003	978-1-5911-6072-4
1. "Southward Bound!!" (南へ…!!); 2. "I'm a Penguin, Man..." (オレ…ペンギン人間…); 3. "Love Communication" (愛のコミュニケーション); 4. "Penguin Pugilist!" (ペンギンボクサー!?); 5. "Coach is Back!" (会長復活!?); 6. "New Super-move" (新必殺技…!?); 7. "Fight Night!!" (試合開始っ!!); 8. "Special Punch" (必殺パンチ!!); 9. "The Kachidoki Gym Comeback!" (ジム再興!?)
3	February 18, 1998	978-4-09-125293-7	November 5, 2003	978-1-5911-6102-8
1. "Selling Popsicles!!" (アイス売り!!); 2. "Humans..." (人間て…); 3. "A Most Memorable Lure" (思いでのルアー); 4. "I Shall Return" (迎えに来ます。); 5. "After the Festival" (祭りの後); 6. "Flight!" (飛んだ!!); 7. "All About Penguins" (ペンギンのすべて); 8. "The Mystery Egg" (謎のタマゴ); 9. "Eyewitness..." (目撃…)
4	April 18, 1998	978-4-09-125294-4	January 14, 2004	978-1-5911-6131-8
1. "So Kind..." (優しっスね…); 2. "Illegitimate Child!!" (隠し子だ!!); 3. "Farewell, Mike..." (マイクのバイバイ); 4. "First Kiss" (初キッス…); 5. "Miss Shirakawa High" (ミスコン); 6. "And the Winner Is..." (ミス白川は!?); 7. "Ginji's Back?!" (銀次君だ!!); 8. "Reunion?!" (偽りの再会…); 9. "First Date" (初デート…)
5	June 18, 1998	978-4-09-125295-1	February 25, 2004	978-1591162551
1. "It's All Over..." (全てが終わった…); 2. "Anything for Love" (かばう…愛); 3. "Kotone" (琴音); 4. "Which Me Is the Best...?" (どっちの俺が…); 5. "Heaven, Hear My Call..." (願いよ天に…); 6. "Splash" (カッポ～ン); 7. "Beware of Penguins!!" (ペンギン注意!!); 8. "Nana-chan" (ナナちゃん); 9. "I've Fallen for You" (惚れたっス)
6	September 1998	978-4-09-125296-8	May 5, 2004	978-1-5911-6255-1
1. "The Killer Kin-Gin Kombo" (金銀コンビ); 2. "The Valentine Stalker" (バレンタインストーカー); 3. "Ko-chan" (浩くん); 4. "What Is 'Pervy'?" (エロ…？); 5. "Mini Weather Report" (ミニスカ天気予報); 6. "The Key" (鍵); 7. "The Call of the Walrus" (ポエェ〜); 8. "'Tis the Season" (恍惚のディスプレイ); 9. "Grilled Cod-roe Rice Balls" (焼きタラコ)
7	November 18, 1998	978-4-09-125297-5	August 10, 2004	978-1-5911-6456-2
1. "Once Was a Boxer" (元ボクサー); 2. "Pinky Ring" (小指のリング); 3. "A Penguin's Lifespan" (ペンギンの寿命); 4. "The Ceiling" (天井); 5. "A Boss to Be Reckoned With" (ボスの器); 6. "Shinnosuke's Love" (進之助の恋); 7. "Love Song" (ラブ・ソング); 8. "A Woman's Intuition" (女 の勘); 9. "But...Still..." (だけど…それでも…); Bonus Feature. "The Sasebo Home & Restaurant" (佐瀬保家設定資料)
8	February 18, 1999	978-4-09-125298-2	October 19, 2004	978-1-5911-6489-0
1. "Just for the Heck of It" (とりあえず…); 2. "Just as Much as Ginji" (銀次さんと同じくらい…); 3. "White Osprey" (白いミサゴ); 4. "It's a Curse!" (祟りじゃ!!); 5. "Completely Naked!" (オールヌード); 6. "Our Lady of Heat Exhaustion" (夏バテレディー); 7. "Nan Da Nai!!" (南駄無っ!!); 8. "What Is...This Feeling?" (なんだろう…この気持ち。); 9. "The Heartbreak Haunted House" (別れのお化け屋敷); 10. "The Cause of the Suntan" (日焼けの訳)
9	April 17, 1999	978-4-09-125299-9	December 14, 2004	978-1-5911-6585-9
1. "Reputation" (噂……); 2. "Pierced Earrings" (ピアス); 3. "Room"; 4. "Flower"; 5. "Pager" (Pocket Bell); 6. "Really Dirty!" (本ツ当…汚い。); 7. "High-voltage Uppercut of Mercy" (情けの電撃アッパー); 8. "A Time to Molt" (換羽期); 9. "I'm Sorry, Ko..." (ゴメン…浩君。)
10	June 16, 1999	978-4-09-125300-2	February 9, 2005	978-1-5911-6695-5
1. "Coach Iida" (飯田調教師); 2. "Brain VS. Groin" (理性VS欲望); 3. "White Lie" (嘘); 4. "I'll Show You a Real Man!" (男、魅せますッ!!); 5. "The Night of Revenge" (復讐の夜); 6. "Escape" (脱出); 7. "Water Melons" (オッパイぽろり…); 8. "Homesick" (望郷); 9. "Double Lesson" (Wレッスン)
11	August 7, 1999	978-4-0912-5301-9	April 19, 2005	978-1-5911-6744-0
1. "Lost & Found" (落としもの…); 2. "Grandma, Get a Grip!" (ばあちゃん、しっかり…); 3. "Penguin Hunting Season!?" (ペンギン狩り !?); 4. "Sudden First Kiss" (突然の初キッス); 5. "Chocolate..." (チョコなんて…); 6. "A Missed Opportunity" (逃げたチャンス…); 7. "Not a Dream" (夢じゃない…); 8. "Is This My Destiny?" (コレが運命なのか？); 9. "Anomaly!?" (異変!?)
12	October 18, 1999	978-4-0912-5302-6	June 7, 2005	978-1-5911-6798-3
1. "Just the Two of Us" (二人きり…); 2. "Mike's Anguish" (マイクの苦悩…); 3. "Popo-chan" (ポポちゃん); 4. "Spring Storm" (春の嵐); 5. "Sister..." (お姉さん…); 6. "Phantom Bandit 'Moonshadow'" (怪盗朧月…); 7. "A Matter of Male Pride" (男の意地); 8. "The Fullness of Youth" (若気のいたり…); 9. "Boys Are Patethic" (男たちのバ〜カ)
13	January 18, 2000	978-4-09-125303-3	September 13, 2005	978-1-5911-6861-4
1. "Demoted Knight" (降格騎士); 2. "She Has Her Reasons" (彼女の事情); 3. "Encounter" (邂逅); 4. "A Star Is Born" (すたぁ〜誕生); 5. "Summer Love" (夏ボーイ); 6. "Animal Out of Control" (暴走アニマル); 7. "Train Ride From Hell!" (電車でウー!!); 8. "A Girl's Best Friend" (ただ1匹ワンちゃん); 9. "Just the Two of Us" (二人っきり…); 10. "How Do I Look...?" (どうじゃ…)
14	March 18, 2000	978-4-09-125304-0	October 11, 2005	978-1-4215-0033-1
1. "Decision!!" (決心!!); 2. "A Huge Mistake" (大失態); 3. "Renewed Determination!!" (決意新たに!!); 4. "From Despair to..." (絶望から…); 5. "Superstar of the Land" (陸の大スター); 6. "A Smooch ❤ and a Caress" (チューQしてモミモミ); 7. "A Man's Worth...!!" (男の価値は……!!); 8. "Speaking More Than Words..." (想いは必ず…); 9. "I Want Love!!" (愛が欲し・・い)
15	April 18, 2000	978-4-0912-5305-7	December 13, 2005	978-1-4215-0133-8
1. "Stupid Men II" (男たちのバ〜カ2); 2. "Tsutomu Yamaguchi" (山口つとむ); 3. "Popo's First Love!?" (ポポ初恋); 4. "Up Close and Personal...!!" (大接近…!!); 5. "Changing World" (変わりゆく世界); 6. "The Shape of Love" (幸せの形…); 7. "He's Back..." (アイツがまた…); 8. "Rescue" (救出); 9. "Decision" (選択); 10. "Ginji Kusanagi" (草薙銀次); 11. "Gin-chan..." (ギンちゃん…)

== Reception ==
Tuxedo Gin has been reviewed as having the sort of wacky premise and serious plotlines that make a good romantic comedy, unfortunately being weakened by mediocre characters. Tokihiko Matsuura's art has been praised for clean lines and clear layouts but criticized for its generic character designs.
