= Miss Hokusai =

Manga series and anime film

- Cover of first volume of Miss Hokusai, reprinted in 1992

百日紅 (Sarusuberi)
- Genre: Historical
- Manga
- Written by: Hinako Sugiura
- Published by: Jitsugyo no Nihon Sha
- Magazine: Weekly Manga Sunday
- Original run: 1983 – 1987
- Volumes: 3
- Anime film
- Directed by: Keiichi Hara
- Produced by: Keiko Matsushita; Asako Nishikawa
- Written by: Miho Maruo
- Music by: Harumi Fuki; Yo Tsuji
- Studio: Production I.G
- Licensed by: AUS: Madman Entertainment; NA: GKIDS; UK: Anime Limited
- Released: May 9, 2015
- Runtime: 90 minutes

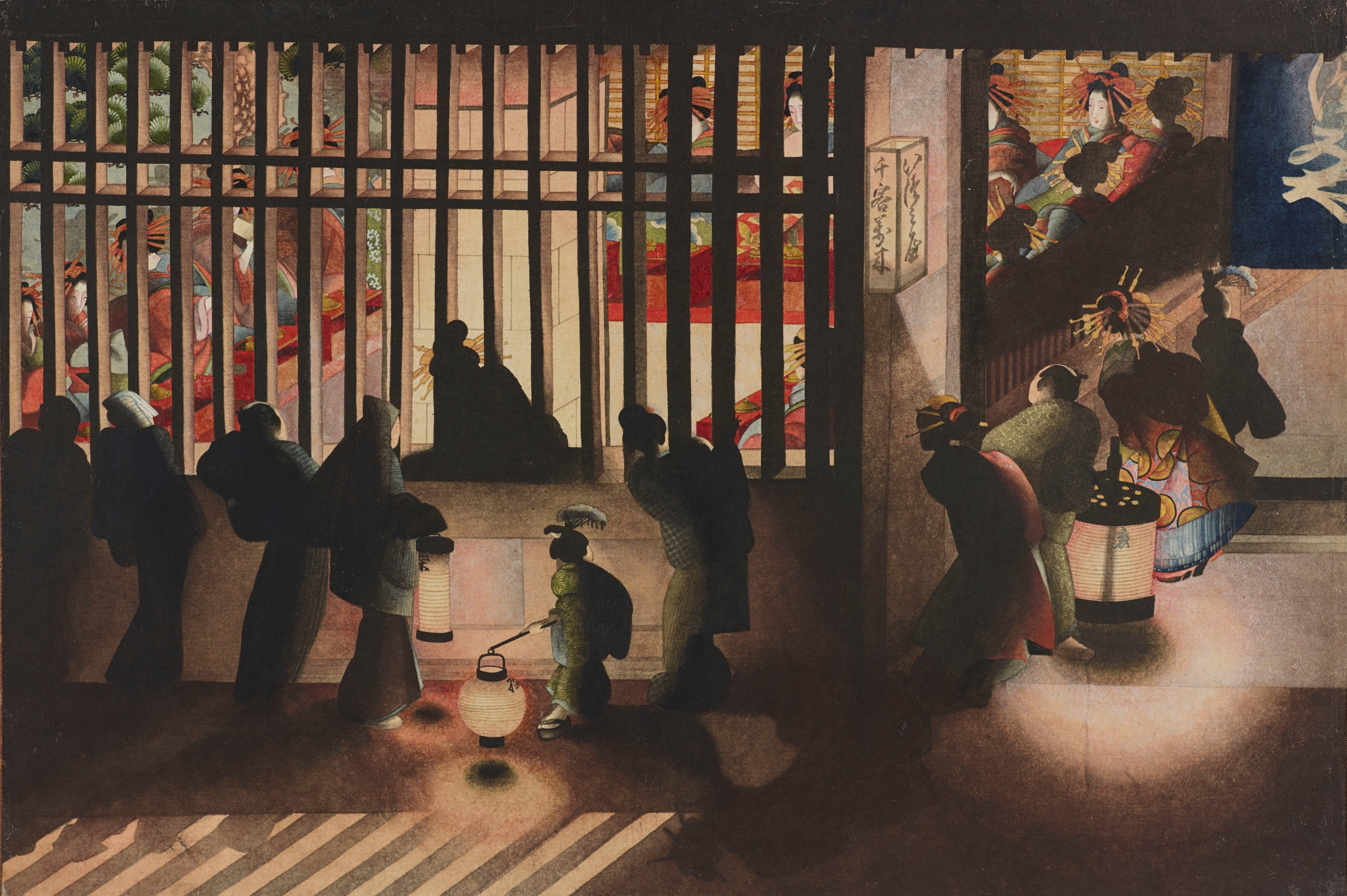
Nightscene in Yoshiwara (吉原格子先之図) by Katsushika Ōi, which featured in the credits

Miss Hokusai (百日紅, Sarusuberi) is a Japanese historical manga series written and illustrated by Hinako Sugiura, telling the story of Katsushika Ōi who worked in the shadow of her father Hokusai. It was adapted into an anime film directed by Keiichi Hara, that was released in 2015.

The series is set in the Edo period and covers the careers of the painter Tetsuzo (Hokusai) and his daughter O-Ei from 1814 to O-Ei's mysterious disappearance in 1857. In the story, O-Ei is not credited for her own works.

== Title ==
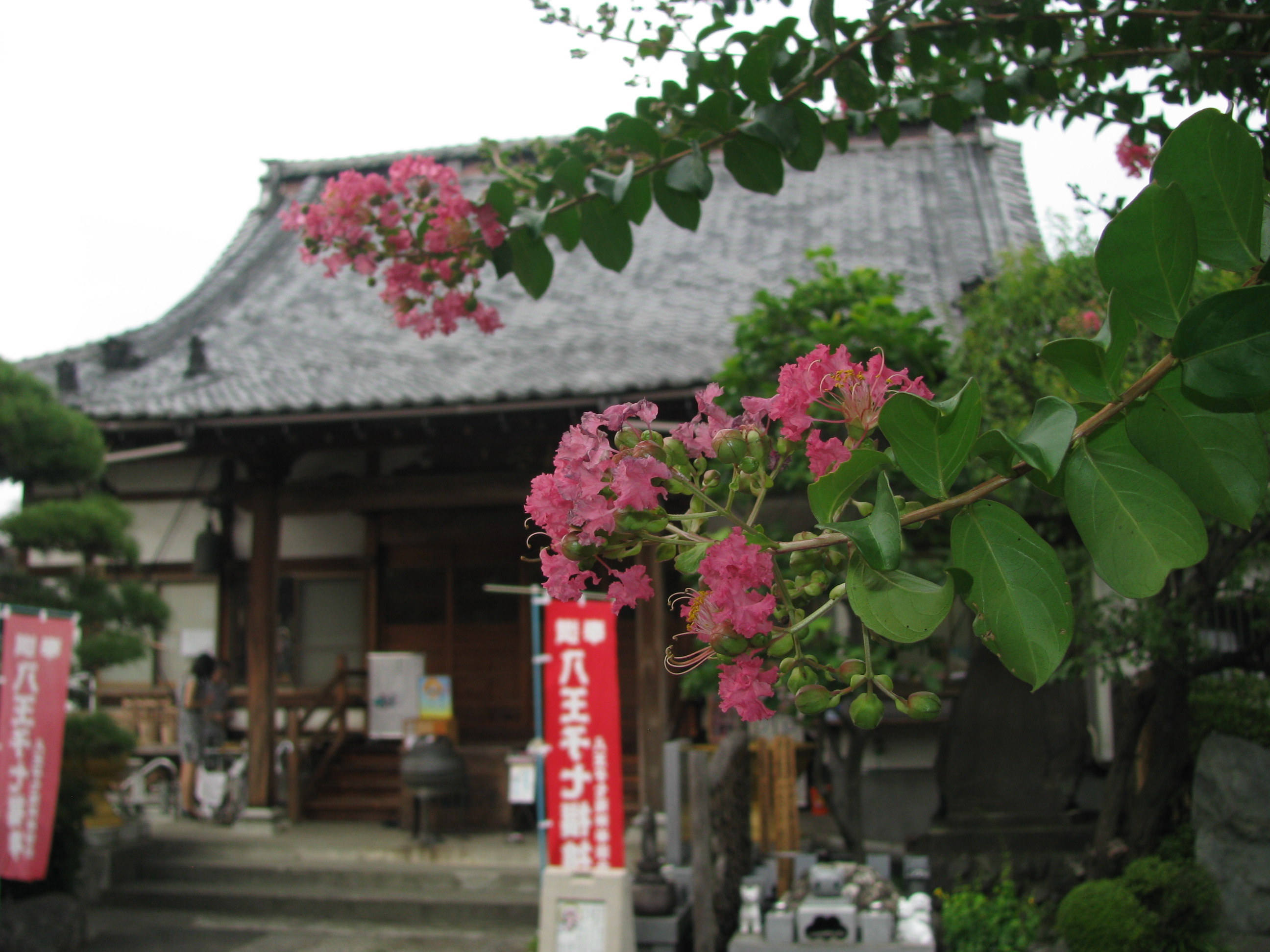
A sarusuberi in Tokyo

The Japanese title is sarusuberi (百日紅), the Japanese name of Lagerstroemia indica. Sugiura explained that Japanese culture remarked that the tree keeps blooming abundantly while its flowers fall. The author compared the vigor of the plant and that of ukiyo-e.

== Plot ==
The manga story consists of episodes which are not necessarily connected to each other. They feature O-Ei and her life in Edo, as she works in the studio of her father. The younger sister appears in one of the episodes.

The anime story begins in Edo in 1814, during the Edo period. O-Ei is one of the four daughters of the painter Tetsuzo, who later became known as Hokusai. The film takes place when O-Ei reaches adulthood, while her father, aged about fifty, is already a recognized artist in his country. Tetsuzo is known for his famous painting skills, such as painting the Great Daruma or two sparrows on a grain of rice. O-Ei has the talent and obstinacy from her father. The studio in which they both work is completely cluttered. O-Ei paints often at her desk, without signing her work, in order to complete the orders, and does not get any recognition for her talent.

The film alternates episodes of the life of O-Ei and her father and the painters that visit, especially Zenjirō Ikeda (Keisai Eisen), who later became known for his bijin-ga, and Kuninao Utagawa. Several scenes feature Japanese mythology and Buddhism. After accidentally damaging a Japanese dragon painting that her father had to deliver the next day, O-Ei had to repaint the dragon herself. During the night, a heavy storm breaks out and the dragon descends from the clouds. This could be derived from a Tang period story which details a technique for capturing a dragon in a painting. The topic of ikiryō is also depicted, such as when Tetsuzo's astral hands fly, or when they investigate rumours about a famous oiran in the Yoshiwara district, whose astral head tries to leave her body during the night. The Amitābha Pure Land Buddhism is also a theme, such as when the wife of a patron is losing her mind because of a painting of jigoku (Buddhist hell) by O-Ei. Tetsuzo realizes that O-Ei did "not finish" the painting and he completes it by adding the image of Kṣitigarbha, which finally gives the wife peace. The Buddha makes another appearance with two Bodhisattvas in a dream sequence.

The film also explores the relationship between O-Ei, Tetsuzo, and her half-sister O-Nao from her father's first marriage. O-Nao is blind from birth and sickly, but Tetsuzo, who is afraid of death and disease and hates the sick, never visits her. O-Ei takes care of her by taking her to Ryōgoku Bridge, describing the landscapes and making her touch, listen and feel the world. When O-Ei's younger sister falls ill, she convinces her father to finally visit, and he even paints a picture of a protective deity. But the little girl does not recover and passes away. She enters the studio in the form of a strong gust of wind, leaving behind on the floor a single tsubaki flower her older sister once gave her.

O-Ei remains single and is not interested in romantic relationships. She gains the interest of one of the male painters who often visits her father. However, O-Ei is interested in a different man. She attempts to pursue him, even taking the uncharacteristic effort to dress up to go to a show with him, but ultimately gives up her pursuit after seeing him with another woman. Her father entrusts her with orders for erotic shunga prints, and customers reproach O-Ei's drawings for being too coldly executed. She visits a male prostitute in an attempt to gain sexual experience to improve her erotic painting techniques, but in the end she remains uninterested in sexuality.

The film ends by detailing the fates of the main characters. Tetsuzo, who became Hokusai, died at the age of 90. On his deathbed, he humbly lamented that if only he had lived for 5–10 more years, he might have become a great artist. Zenjiro gained some fame from painting women. He died a year before Tetsuzo. O-Ei got married, but it did not work out. She returned to Tetsuzo's workshop, surviving him by nine years. One summer's day in 1857, she went for a walk and disappeared. The exact circumstances and place of her death are unknown.

== Cast ==
Character	Japanese voice actor	English voice actor
O-Ei	Anne Watanabe	Erica Lindbeck
Katsushika Hokusai	Yutaka Matsushige	Richard Epcar
Ikeda Zenjiro	Gaku Hamada	Ezra Weisz
Utagawa Kuninao	Kengo Kora	Robbie Daymond
Koto	Jun Miho	Barbara Goodson
O-Nao	Shion Shimizu	Courtney Chu
Iwakubo Hatsugoro	Michitaka Tsutsui	Marc Diraison
Kichiya	Miyu Irino	Kevin T. Collins

== Media ==
=== Manga ===
Hinako Sugiura started the manga when she was 25 years old. The figure of O-Ei is regarded by director Keiichi Hara as the avatar of the creator. The manga story consists of episodes which are not necessarily connected to each other. The anime story is based on the manga.

=== Anime film ===
In producing the adaptation Hara chose to focus on the character of O-Ei due to how her role becomes more important as the original manga progressed. Original sequences were added during the middle and end of the film. The role of the blind younger sister, O-Nao, was also expanded.

The film opened in Japan on May 9, 2015. It received its North American premier at the Fantasia International Film Festival between July 12 and August 5, 2015. Anime Limited screened the film in the United Kingdom, with the premiere on October 10, 2015, with Hara in attendance.

== Reception ==
=== Critical response ===
On the review aggregator website Rotten Tomatoes, 93% of 58 critics' reviews are positive, with an average rating of 7.3/10. The website's consensus reads: "Miss Hokusai illuminates the life and creative legacy of its brilliant subject with a beautifully animated biopic whose absorbing visuals are matched by its narrative grace."

Boyd van Hoeij of The Hollywood Reporter called the film "an episodic but extremely rich anime".

The film won the Jury Award at the 39th Annecy International Animated Film Festival. Keiichi Hara won the Asiagraph 2015 Tsumugi Prize for the film. At the 19th Fantasia International Film Festival, it won the Gold Audience Award for best animated feature film, the Satoshi Kon Award for best animated feature film and the Séquences Award for best Asian feature film. It won the Best Animation Film Award at the 70th Mainichi Film Awards.

=== Accolades ===
Award	Date of ceremony	Category	Recipient(s)	Result	Ref(s)
Annie Awards	February 4, 2017	Best Animated Feature – Independent	Miss Hokusai	Nominated	
Satellite Awards	February 19, 2017	Best Animated or Mixed Media Feature	Miss Hokusai	Nominated	
