= Hinako Sugiura =

Japanese manga artist

- 杉浦日向子
- Born: Junko Suzuki; November 30, 1958
- Died: July 22, 2005 (aged 46)
- Occupations: manga artist, researcher
- Spouse: Hiroshi Aramata (??-??)
- Writing career
- Language: Japanese
- Notable work: Fūryū Edo Suzume
- Notable awards: Japan Cartoonists Association Award 1984 'Gassō'; Bungei Shunjū Manga Award 1988 'Fūryū Edo Suzume'

Hinako Sugiura (杉浦日向子, Sugiura Hinako; November 30, 1958 – July 22, 2005) was a Japanese manga artist and researcher in the lifestyles and customs of Japan's Edo period.

== Life ==
Born Junko Suzuki in Minato, Tokyo, into a tradition-steeped family of kimono merchants, she studied design and took an increasing interest in old Japan. She attended Nihon University, but gave up her formal studies to pursue research under the direction of author Shisei Inagaki. Inagaki specialized in the Edo period and taught Sugiura how to do the background surveys that would later ensure the historical accuracy of her manga and other works.

Sugiura was the assistant of Murasaki Yamada, a prominent feminist manga artist. Sugiura published her first manga, "Tsugen Muro no Ume," in the alternative manga magazine Garo in 1980. Her distinctive style drew heavily on ukiyo-e techniques and breathed life into her depictions of Edo-period life and customs, helping her win popularity as well as the Japan Cartoonists Association Award for her manga Gassō ("Joint Burial") in 1984 and the Bungei Shunjū Manga Award for Fūryū Edo Suzume in 1988.

In 1993, Sugiura announced that she was retiring from her life as a manga artist to dedicate herself to research on Edo period lifestyles and customs. She wrote numerous books on the subject, which she considered to be her life's work, and frequently appeared in the media as an expert on the period. She was well known and liked for her commentary during the ending segment of a popular NHK program, Comedy: O-Edo de Gozaru, which was set in the Edo period. Sugiura was usually seen in public wearing traditional kimono.

When Sugiura left the Comedy: O-Edo de Gozaru program, she told the public that she was going to fulfil a long-cherished dream by taking a world cruise. That she was actually undergoing treatment for cancer of the throat (the hypopharynx) at a hospital in Kashiwa, Chiba, first become known when the public learned of her death at 46 on July 22, 2005.

== Reception ==
Her work had an influence on manga artist Daisuke Igarashi.

== Personal life ==
Sugiura was married for a time to novelist, translator, and bibliophile Hiroshi Aramata, a pairing the Japanese media referred to as "the beauty and the beast." She was also famous for her love of soba buckwheat noodles as well as a preference for saké.

== Works ==
- Tsūgen Muro no Ume (通言室之梅, 1980)
- Gassō (合葬, 1983)
- Sarusuberi (百日紅, 1983–1987, 3 volumes)
- Nipponia Nippon (ニッポニア・ニッポン, 1985)
- Edo e youkoso (江戸へようこそ, 1986)
- Futatsu makura (二つ枕, 1986)
- Fūryū Edo Suzume (風流江戸雀, 1987)
- Yasuji Tōkyō (YASUJI東京, 1988)
- Hyaku Monogatari (百物語, 1988–1993, 3 volumes)
- Higashi no Eden (東のエデン, 1989)

== Awards ==
- 1984: Japan Cartoonists Association Award for Gassō
- 1988: Bungeishunjū Manga Award for Fūryū Edo Suzume
