= Sunao Hari =

Japanese manga artist

Sunao Hari (針 すなお, Hari Sunao), real name Sunao Takagawa (高閑者 順, Takagawa Sunao), is a Japanese manga artist and illustrator, martial artist born 15 March 1933 in Saga, Saga Prefecture, Japan. He graduated from Saga Prefectural Saga High School (now Saga Prefectural Saga West High School).

Hari is the fifth son of the chief priest at Kōdenji, a family temple in the former Saga Domain. He worked at a cotton spinning company and as a bank employee before moving to Tokyo in 1953 to work as a writer for a financial journal. Hari made his professional manga debut in 1956.

He holds a level of 8th dan in aikido, and he studied an offshoot of Shintō Musō-ryū staff fighting called "Tai no Jō" (体の杖). He currently operates in Saga City a dojo devoted to the study of aikido and jōjutsu (staff fighting).

Hari creates the politician caricatures for the Sankei Shimbun, as well as a weekly one panel manga for the Weekly Manga Times. He won the 1973 Japan Cartoonists Association Award for Excellence for his work Hari Sunao Nigaoe Mangashū: Sokkuri (針すなお似顔絵漫画集・そっくり). He also won the Bungeishunjū Manga Award in 1998 for his political caricatures.
