= Shou Arai =

Japanese manga artist

- 新井 祥
- Born: April 17, 1971 (age 55)
- Other name: CHACO (pen name)
- Occupation: Manga Artist
- Notable work: No Gender! The Queer Life of an Intersex Manga Artist, At 30 I Realized I Had No Gender
- Spouse(s): IKKAN, Usaki Kou

Shou Arai (also spelled Shō Arai, Japanese: 新井 祥; born April 17, 1971) is an author and manga artist. He is known for his work relating to LGBTQI experiences including At 30, I Realized I Had No Gender and Gakkōde wa Oshiete Kurenai 'Sekumai' no Hanashi (English title: The Story of Sexual Minorities They Didn't Tell You In School). He also starred in Seibetsu ga, Nai! Intersex Mangaka no Queer na Hibi (English title: No Gender! The Queer Life of an Intersex Manga Artist), a documentary based on his life. Arai is an intersex transgender man.

== Works ==
Arai focuses on personal stories in his works. When asked in an interview about the importance of representing a variety of people in manga and books, Arai responded, "Because I have a mind that rebels against the idea that 'the majority is the righteous one, so the minority should put up with it and conform to the majority.'"

In 2002, Arai released a book called カムアウト 胸取っちゃった日記 (translation: "Coming Out: Diary of Getting My Breasts Removed"). The book was released under the pen name CHACO and is about Arai's top surgery.

Arai created a four panel essay manga called Seibetsu ga, Nai!, separate from the similarly named documentary he starred in. This manga was first published in 2005. Volume 15 was published in 2015. Arai also created Change H (2009-2013), a manga about a boy turning into a girl and a girl turning into a boy, and Yuzu no Koto (2018), a manga about a girl's best friend changing gender.

Arai is the subject of the documentary No Gender! The Queer Life of an Intersex Manga Artist. This documentary was crowdfunded through Motion Gallery and raised 1,973,800 yen (18,000 USD) out of its 4 million yen (37,000 USD) goal. The Story of Sexual Minorities They Didn't Tell You In School, is a manga answering questions about sexual minorities and exploring Arai's life experiences. It was released in preparation for the documentary. The documentary itself was released in Japan on July 28, 2018.

On June 13, 2023, Arai's manga At 30, I Realized I Had No Gender was published. It is an autobiographical manga describing typical challenges faced by LGBTQIA+ people in Japan and aging as a queer person. Rebecca Silverman from Anime News Network describes it as an "open, frank, and honest discussion that sticks with you."

== Personal life ==
Arai is a former sex worker. He experienced hormone irregularities in his teens that would make him shift from masculine to feminine. Arai developed masculine facial hair, and by age 30 had an enlarged clitoris and masculine body hair. He lived as a woman until age 30. During his time living as a woman, he married the voice actor IKKAN. The two later divorced amicably. Arai moved from Tokyo to Nagoya. He went on to transition to living as a man at age 30. Also at age 30, he discovered through chromosomal testing that he is intersex. In 2020, he married Usaki Kou, a boys' love mangaka and his former assistant.
