= Rin Emasu =

Japanese actress and model

Rin Emasu 江益 凛
- Born: 11 August 1995 (age 31); Chiba Prefecture,Japan
- Occupations: Actress, Model
- Years active: 2015 - Present
- Height: 157 cm (5 ft 2 in)
- Website: ドルチェスター

Rin Emasu (Japanese: 江益 凛, Hepburn: Emasu Rin; born 11 August 1995) is a Japanese actress and model. She has been affiliated with the talent agency Dolce Star (ドルチェスター) since 2016. She graduated from Chiba Prefectural Yachiyo High School (千葉県立八千代高校), and now studies economics at Komazawa University (駒澤大学).

== Biography ==
Rin Emasu was born and raised in Chiba Prefecture, Japan. In high school period she participated a National Drama Championships and won Awards For Excellence.

== Filmography ==
=== Television dramas ===
Year	Japanese title	English title	Role
August 2014	千葉テレビ「魁！武藤塾」	Chiba Television "Sakigake! Muto Juku"	
July 2015	テレビ神奈川「I LOVE BAYSTARS」	Television Kanagawa "I LOVE BAYSTARS"	
July 2015	テレビ朝日「手裏剣戦隊ニンニンジャー」	TV Asahi "Shuriken Sentai Ninninger"	Ship Passenger
August 2015	テレビ朝日 土曜ワイド「警視庁・捜査一課長」	TV Asahi Saturday Wide "keishicyō - Sousa Ichikacyō "	
August 2015	日本テレビ・Hulu「マジすか学園5」	Nippon TV / Hulu "Majiku ka Gakuen 5"	
August 2015	テレビ朝日「エイジハラスメント」	TV Asahi "Age Harassment"	
October 2015	日本テレビ「掟上今日子の備忘録」	Nippon TV "Kyouko no bibōroku"	Staff of the museum
October 2015	日本テレビ「エンジェルハート」	Nippon TV "Angel Heart"	

=== Movie ===
Year	Japanese title	English title	Role	Notes
1 October 2017	「この宇宙のどこかで」	「Kono Uchū No Doko Ka De」	Kasumi	Youtube
6 January 2018	「牙狼〈GARO〉 神ノ牙-KAMINOKIBA-」	「Garo: Kami no Kiba」	Horror (Garo)	Garo: Kami no Kiba

=== Stage dramas ===
Year	Japanese title	Role	Notes
June 2015	演劇ユニットザレ×ゴト第10回公演『歌う金魚のアラベスク』	Anna	
September 2015	劇団スプーキーズ第14回公演『おおきに龍馬』	Syunme Shiramine	Youtube
February 2016	演劇ユニットザレ×ゴト第12回公演『らいおんの憂鬱』	Nicora	
December 2016	演劇ユニットみっくるんVol.0 『舞台はここに/ラブ・レター』	Yume/Teacher	Screenplay / Director
December 2016	演劇ユニットザレ×ゴト第13回公演『天使の決断』	Michelle	
April 2017	演劇ユニットザレ×ゴト第14回公演『真夜中にサルの夢を』	Aoi Hinata	
August 2017	音楽劇『赤毛のアン in サンリオピューロランド』	Gādi	
October 2017	演劇ユニットハレボンド第4回公演『父、カエル。』	Ameo	Tokyo Performance A Team
21-25 February 2018	A企畫プロデュース『ばにら、明日をありがとう』	/	Voice only
11-13 May 2018	ILLUMINUS『家族のはなし』		Tokyo Performance Link
12-17 June 2018	ILLUMINUS『ナイゲン』	3148	Link

=== Advertisement・CM・MV ===
Type	Japanese title	English title	Notes
CM	『アルファロメオ』	"Alfa Romeo"	
MV	『あなたの歌は最後にするね』	"Anata No Uta Wa Saigo Ni Suru Ne"	Youtube

=== Event ===
Year	Japanese title	English title	Notes
April 2016	横浜スリーエス 『24時間100キロマラソン企画』		With bicycle link
21 February 2017	楽天スーパーライブTV 『「ネコの日」特集 Part 1 大人気にゃんこ「ふーちゃん」中継』	Rakuten SUPER LIVE TV 『「Neko No Hi」 Tokushū Part 1 Daininki Nyanko 「Fu-chan」 Chūkei』	Youtube
10-12 February 2018	若手声優団体声珈琲企画 『 リーディングライブ「Voice BOX vol.5~駅の箱~」』	Wakate Seiyū Dantai Koekōhī Kikaku 『 Reading live 「Voice BOX vol.5 ~Station Box~」	Harajuku & Kakizaki Rico role (Cast B) link
05-6 April 2018	FreeK-Laboratory企画 『リーディングライブ「UBUGOE vol.18 ～voice of comedy～」	FreeK-Laboratory Kikaku 『 Reading live 「UBUGOE vol.18 ～voice of comedy～」	
