= Rize Shinba =

Japanese manga author and illustrator

- Occupation: Manga artist
- Known for: Fujoshi Kanojo, Mister Mistress
- Website: http://mix.sub.jp/

Rize Shinba (神葉 理世, Shinba Rize) is a Japanese manga artist.

== Works ==
- Mister Mistress (愛人☆淫魔) a yaoi manga.
- Intriguing Secrets (僕の恋の話・ヒメゴト, Boku no Koi no Hanashi - Himegoto) a yaoi manga.
- The manga adaption of the novel Fujoshi Kanojo (腐女子彼女) by Pentabu which was based on a popular blog. The manga is translated in Chinese and recently German where it is published as Akihabara Shojo.
