= Kojiro =

Kojirō, Kojiro, Koujirou or Kohjiroh is a masculine Japanese given name. It can also be a surname. Notable people with the name include:

- Chie Kōjiro (神代 知衣, born 1960), Japanese voice actress
- Kojiro Kaimoto (海本 幸治郎, born 1977), Japanese footballer
- Kōjirō Matsumoto (松本 孝次郎, 1870–1932), Japanese educationist
- Kojiro Nakamura (中村 廣治郎, 1936-2023), Japanese scholar of Islam
- Sasaki Kojirō (Ganryu Kojiro, c. 1585–1612), Japanese swordsman famous for his rivalry with Miyamoto Musashi
- Kojiro Shimizu (清水 宏次朗, born 1964), Japanese actor
- Kojiro Tamba (丹波 幸次郎, 1912–?), Japanese sport wrestler

== Fictional characters ==
- James (Pokémon) (Kojiro), a member of Team Rocket from the Pokémon series
- Kojiro, a character in Brave Fencer Musashi, a fictional personification of Sasaki Kojiro
- Kojiro Hyuga, a supporting character from Captain Tsubasa
- Kojiro Kanemaki, a main character in Orient
- Kojiro Murdoch, a supporting character in Mobile Suit Gundam SEED
- Nezu Kojirō, a supporting character in The Elusive Samurai
- Rinko Koujiro, a supporting character in Sword Art Online: Alicization
- Kojiro Sakai, a supporting character in The Irresponsible Captain Tylor
- Kojiro Vance, identified as the master of the spaceship Kobayashi Maru in the movie Star Trek II: The Wrath of Khan

== See also ==
- Sasaki Kojiro a 1967 Japanese drama film directed by Hiroshi Inagaki
- Fūma no Kojirō, a Japanese manga and anime series and its title character
- Kōjiro Station (Nagasaki), a train station in Unzen, Nagasaki Prefecture, Japan
- Kōjiro Station (Yamaguchi), a train station in Iwakuni, Yamaguchi Prefecture, Japan
