= Yōji Kuri =

Japanese cartoonist and independent filmmaker (1928–2024)

- 久里洋二
- Born: April 9, 1928; Sabae, Fukui, Japan
- Died: November 24, 2024 (aged 96)
- Other names: Hideo Kurihara (birth name); Kuri Yōji
- Education: Bunka Gakuin
- Occupations: Cartoonist; Independent filmmaker

Yōji Kuri (久里洋二, Kuri Yōji; April 9, 1928 – November 24, 2024) was a Japanese cartoonist and independent filmmaker. An influential figure in Japanese independent animation, he was the unofficial leader and most prolific of the "Animation Association of Three" (アニメーション三人の会, Animēshon Sannin no Kai) collective who kick-started the renaissance of modern-styled, independently made, adult-aimed animation in early 1960s Japan. He is known internationally for the very black comedy of his films, with the typically naïve style of his cartooning often belying the surreal, obscene and disturbing situations they depict (though he has worked in a variety of styles and mediums, including pixilation); this made them a favourite among the fervently counter-cultural audiences, which included such filmmakers as René Laloux, of the first few years of the Annecy International Animated Film Festival, and in a 1967 publication he was considered to be "the most significant" and "the only Japanese animator whose work is known in the West" (which is to disregard the Toei Animation features and Astro Boy series that were first seen in the West around the same time that Kuri's first several films were and mentioned in passing in the same publication, though these were not known as works of an individual and characteristic filmmaker and often had their Japanese origin played down). He is also known in Japan for his comics, a collection of which earned him the 1958 Bungeishunjū Manga Award. Though he was retired from filmmaking, he continued to illustrate and teach animation at Laputa Art Animation School (アート・アニメーションのちいさな学校, Āto Animēshon no Chiisana Gakkō).

Kuri died on November 24, 2024, at the age of 96. His death was announced in the following month, on December 15.

== Collaboration with Yoko Ono ==
Kuri collaborated with avant-garde artist Yoko Ono. In 1963, his film Human Zoo (featuring music by Takemitsu) was presented alongside Ono at the Festum Fluxorum Fluxus event in Düsseldorf. For his 1964 surreal black-and-white short Aos (based on illustrations by Yōsuke Inoue), Ono provided the vocal soundtrack including screams and moans. Decades later, in 2009, Ono and musician Keigo Oyamada (Cornelius) recorded new music for The Sun Is Down, a five-minute animation featuring Inoue's artwork that was screened during Kuri's 2010 solo exhibition in Tokyo.

== Awards and honors ==
Kuri received numerous awards throughout his career, including:

- 1958 – Fourth Bungeishunjū Manga Award
- 1962 – Venice Film Festival Bronze Medal, for Human Zoo
- 1963 – Annecy International Animated Film Festival Special Jury Prize
- 1964 – Oberhausen Film Festival Best Work Award, for Love; Kraków Film Festival Gold Dragon Award
- 1967 – Oberhausen Film Festival Best Work Award; Chicago International Film Festival Grand Prix
- 1992 – Medal with Purple Ribbon
- 1993 – Annecy International Animation Film Festival ASIFA Honorary Award
- 2006 – Tokyo International Animation Festival Special Achievement Award
- 2011 – Order of the Rising Sun, 4th Class (Gold Rays with Rosette)
- 2012 – Lifetime Achievement Award at the World Festival of Animated Film (Animafest Zagreb)
- 2017 – Japan Cartoonists Association Award Grand Prize, for Crazy Manga

== Filmography ==
Kuri made over 40 short films between 1960 and 1981:

Year	English title	Japanese title	Length	Notes
1960	Fashion	ファッション	5 min	
1960	Mitsuwa Soap	ミツワ石鹸	1 min	1st ACC Manga Award (1961)
1960	Two Fishes (B/W Ver.) / Two Sunfish	二匹のサンマ（白黒版）	22 min	Music by Kuniharu Akiyama; poem by Shuntarō Tanikawa
1960	Fantasia of Stamps	切手の幻想	7 min	Music by Hikaru Hayashi
1962	Clap Vocalism / Human Zoo	人間動物園	3 min	Music by Tōru Takemitsu; screenplay by Shuntarō Tanikawa; 1962 Venice Bronze Medal, 1963 Annecy Special Jury Prize
1962	Here and There	あっちこっち	20 min	
1963	Locus / Trajectory	軌跡	7 min	
1963	Love	愛	5 min	Music by Tōru Takemitsu; poem by Shuntarō Tanikawa; 1963 Venice Bronze Medal, 1964 Oberhausen Best Work, Krakow Gold Dragon
1963	Ring Ring Boy	リングリングボーイ	4 min	
1963	Discovery of Zero	ゼロの発見	20 min	San Francisco Film Festival Honorable Mention
1963	Man, Woman and Dog	男と女と犬	3 min	
1964	The Chair	椅子	10 min	1964 Cannes Film Festival Official Selection
1964	The Button	ザ・ボタン	3 min	1964 Locarno Special Award
1964	Aos	アオス	9 min	Vocal soundtrack by Yoko Ono; illustrations by Yōsuke Inoue; 1965 Oberhausen Excellence Award
1965	The Man Next Door	隣の野郎	9 min	
1965	Samurai	さむらい	8 min	1966 Mamaia Silver Prize
1965	The Window	窓	6 min	
1965	Au Fou! (Original Ver.)	殺人狂時代（オリジナル版）	13 min	Features a parody of Yukio Mishima's Patriotism
1966	Little Whisper	小さなささやき	12 min	
1966	Sade's Egg	サドの卵	10 min	
1967	Au Fou! (International Ver.)	殺人狂時代（海外版）	10 min	Color version; 1967 Oberhausen Best Work, Chicago Golden Hugo
1967	The Room	部屋	5 min	Music by Toshi Ichiyanagi; 1967 Venice St. Mark's Lion, Ōfuji Noburō Award
1967	What Are You Thinking?	あなたは何を考えているの？	10 min	Tours Special Jury Prize
1967	Flower	花	1 min	Montreal Expo Film Festival 2nd Prize
1968	Two Fishes (Color Ver.)	二匹のサンマ（カラー版）	13 min	Ōfuji Noburō Award
1968	Love of Kemeko	ケメ子のLOVE	3 min	
1969	Tragedy on the G-String	G線上の悲劇	9 min	Music by Toshi Ichiyanagi
1969	The World Is Mine	世界はわがもの	10 min	
1970	3D Animation	立体アニメ	10 min	Produced for Expo '70
1972	The Midnight Parasites	寄生虫の一夜	10 min	Synthesizer score by Isao Tomita; 1973 Oberhausen Silver Award
1972	The Bathroom	ザ・バスルーム	10 min	Live-action stop-motion; music by Kuniharu Akiyama
1973	IMUS	IMUS	7 min	
1974	Freud's Tree	フロイトの木	5 min	
1974	Life on a Tree	木の上の生活	3 min	1974 Animafest Zagreb 2nd Place (Short Film)
1974	POP	ポップ	3 min	1974 Animafest Zagreb 2nd Place (Short Film)
1975	Comedy of Fantasy	幻想の喜劇	5 min	
1975	Population Explosion	人口爆発	5 min	
1976	Evolution	進化	4 min	
1977	MANGA	漫画	7 min	Kraków Film Festival Bronze Dragon
1978	Ceiling Room	天井座敷	6 min	
1978	VANISH	VANISH	3 min	
1978	THE CAT	THE CAT	17 min	
1981	Egoist	エゴイスト	7 min	

== Permanent exhibitions ==
- Manabe Museum, 1 Chome-9-20 Chosenjicho, Sabae, Fukui. The museum is near Nishiyama-Kōen Station of Fukui Railway.
- Tannan Regional Medical Center, 1 Chome-2-31 Sanrokucho, Sabae, Fukui. The medical center is near Shinmei Station of Fukui Railway.
- Gallery K Yoji Kuri No Sekai (The World of Yoji Kuri), 16-18 Tadasucho, Sabae, Fukui. The gallery is an approximately 20-minute walk from Shinmei Station of Fukui Railway.

== See also ==
- Cinema of Japan
- History of anime
