= Kotobuki Shiriagari =

Japanese manga artist and actor

Kotobuki Shiriagari しりあがり 寿
- Born: Toshiki Mochizuki; January 1, 1958 (age 68); Shizuoka, Japan
- Occupations: Manga artist, actor
- Awards: Tezuka Osamu Cultural Prize (2001)
- Website: Personal website

Kotobuki Shiriagari (しりあがり 寿, Shiriagari Kotobuki; born Mochizuki Toshiki, January 1, 1958) is a Japanese manga artist and actor.

== Life ==
Shiriagari was born in Shizuoka in 1958. He studied graphic design at Tama Art University in Tokyo. In early 1981, after graduation, he began to work as an advertising illustrator for the beer company Kirin. He maintained his regular day job, while developing his manga work, until 1994.

His first manga series, launched under his pseudonym Kotobuki Shiriagari, was Ereki na Haru, a strip launched in 1985 by the publisher Hakusensha. His breakthrough as an artist was the series Yajikita in Deep, which he published from 1997 until 2002 in the magazine Comic Beam. His series nowadays still regularly in Comic Beam and experimental magazine AX.

He has been teaching at the School of Progressive Arts in Kobe Design University since 2006. Between 2007 and 2009, he was a jury member of the manga division of the Japan Media Arts Festival.

== Style ==
He is known for his dark humor and social criticism. Known for his "gag" manga, Shiriagari keeps his humor close to the dramatic aspects of life. "I always have the choice of telling it with laughter," he said in an interview about his storytelling.

== Reception ==
Kotobuki's series Jiji Oyaji 2000 and Yuruyuru Oyaji won the Bungeishunjū Manga Award in 2000. He received the Tezuka Osamu Cultural Prize excellence Award in 2001 for his manga Yajikita in Deep.

== Works ==
=== Manga ===
- Ereki na Haru (エレキな春), 1985
- Ora Rokoko da (おらあロココだ) Hakusensha 1987
- O.Shi.Go.To. (おしごと), Hanako / Magazine House, 1992
- Koisomore-sensei (コイソモレ先生), 1993
- Hinshi no Esseiisto (瀕死のエッセイスト), 1993–2002
- Ryuusei Kachou (流星課長), Take Shobou, 1996
- Yajikita in Deep (弥次喜多 in DEEP), 1997–2002
- Futago no Oyaji (双子のオヤジ), 1998–2001
- Jijö Oyaji 2000 (時事おやじ2000), 2000
- Haikai rōjin Don Quichote (徘徊老人ドンキホーテ), 2001
- Shin Hige no OL Sasako Yabuuchi (真・ヒゲのOL藪内笹子), Enterbrain, 2002–2004
- Chikyu Boei Ke no Hitobito (地球防衛家のヒトビト), Asahishimbunsha, 2004
- Mayonaka no Mizukokikado (真夜中の水戸黄門), Comic Beam, 2004–2005
- Mayonaka no Hige no Yaji-san Kita-san (真夜中のヒゲの弥次さん喜多さん), 2005
- Hogaraka Shinjiru Kimi (ほがらか信じる君)
- Gero Gero Pusuka (ゲロゲロプースカ) Comic Beam, 2006

=== Films ===
- 1997 - Tokyo biyori
- 2004 - Cutie Honey
- 2004 - Koi no mon
- 2005 - Yaji and Kita: The Midnight Pilgrims
- 2007 - Quiet room ni yōkoso

=== Video games ===
- Logos Panic Goaisatu (ロゴスパニックごあいさつ) - characters design
- WarioWare: D.I.Y. (メイド イン 俺) - comics

== See also ==
- Sukiyaki Western Django
