= Takeda Hideo =

- 武田 秀雄
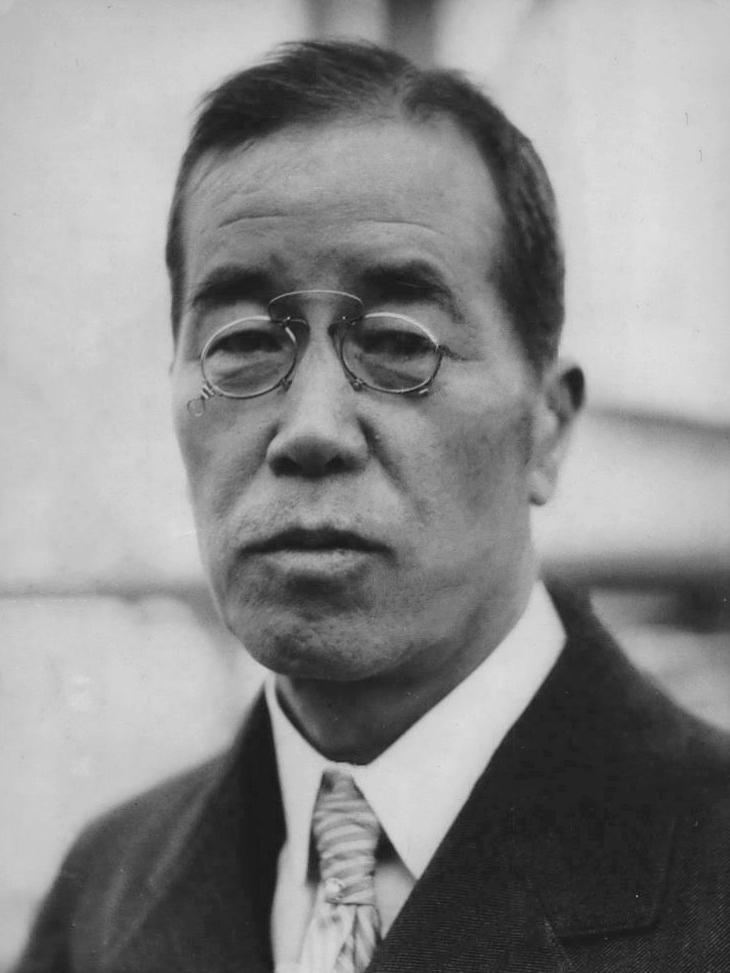
- Takeda in 1924
- Born: November 16, 1863; Noichi, Kōchi, Japan
- Died: February 16, 1942 (aged 78)
- Alma mater: Imperial Japanese Naval Academy
- Military career
- Allegiance: Empire of Japan
- Branch: Imperial Japanese Navy
- Service years: 1886–1914
- Rank: Vice Admiral
- Conflicts: First Sino-Japanese War
- Awards: Order of the Sacred Treasure (1905, 1940)

Takeda Hideo (武田 秀雄; November 16, 1863 – February 16, 1942) was a vice admiral in the Imperial Japanese Navy. In retirement he served as President of Mitsubishi Shipbuilding and of Mitsubishi Electric.

== Biography ==
Takeda graduated from the Imperial Japanese Naval Academy, which he later headed in 1913. Between 1890 and 1894 he studied in France, and afterwards visited France and its colonies several times with various naval missions. After returning to Japan in 1894 Takeda fought in the First Sino-Japanese War on board of Japanese cruiser Itsukushima. His further career was mostly devoted to engineering, teaching, and administration. He was eventually promoted to rear admiral in 1909 and to vice admiral in 1913.

After retiring from military service in 1914, Takeda became an advisor for the Mitsubishi Corporation. He then served as President of Mitsubishi Shipbuilding and of Mitsubishi Electric.
