= Desire (manga) =

Japanese manga

- Cover of Desire Vol. 1

ヤバイ気持ち (Yabai Kimochi)
- Genre: Yaoi
- Manga
- Written by: Maki Kazumi
- Illustrated by: Yukine Honami
- Published by: Tokuma Shoten Publishing
- English publisher: NA: Digital Manga Publishing
- Published: 2001

Desire (ヤバイ気持ち, Yabai Kimochi) is a yaoi manga written by Maki Kazumi and illustrated by Yukine Honami. It was published in October 2004 by Digital Manga Publishing, Inc. A novelisation, called Desire: Dangerous Feelings was also produced.

== General book information ==
The original Japanese edition was published by Tokuma Shoten Publishing Co., Ltd. Tokyo in 2001. Digital Manga Publishing, Inc published an English version in the U.S. and Canada, translated by Kumiko Yuasa under license granted by Tokuma Shoten Publishing Co., Ltd. in 2004. Digital Manga, Inc. owns the English translation copyright for "Desire".

The English First Edition (ISBN 1-56970-979-3) was printed in October, 2004 in Canada and was rated 'M' for mature audiences 18 years and over. The book story consists of four chapters titled "Desire" (which is the story of the manga), including a special additional episode titled "Not That Deviant" (epilogue) and two small chapters titled "Free Talk" were the writer talks about the story and some of the characters in the manga.

== Plot ==
The story is about Toru, an extremely quiet and shy high school student who has a crush on Ryoji, a popular member of the high school swimming team known for his sexual escapades. Further complicating this matter is that Toru and Ryoji are very close friends, thus forcing Toru to hide his real feelings for Ryoji and pretend to be just one of his good friends, while being torn between his love for Ryoji and the facade he has to keep up when he sees him every day.

But all that changes one day when Ryoji makes an indecent proposal to Toru, asking him if he would like to experiment with him sexually, and admitting that he had been aroused by thoughts of him during sexual intercourse with his girlfriend. Toru unhappily accepts, pressured by his feelings for Ryoji, but as time passes Toru becomes even more aggravated as he realizes that his sexual affair with Ryoji was just a fling based on Ryoji's sexual curiosity, and not on actual romantic attraction.

Toru is so depressed about the one-sided situation between him and Ryoji that he confides with a close friend named Kashiwazaki about his emotional turmoil. Together, they come up with a plan to discover Ryoji's true intentions by secretly deciding to lie to him about them being in a romantic relationship together.

After learning of this, Ryoji becomes very angry and jealous about Toru and Kashiwazaki's alleged relationship, and tries to break them up. The plan apparently has worked, but Toru is now in a serious love triangle between Ryoji and Kashiwazaki when he begins to realize that Kashiwazaki has been in love with him for a very long time. As the story progresses, he begins to understand that he and Ryoji were not the only ones that were hiding their true feelings.

== Reception ==
Desire sold 6,000 copies between September 2004 and July 2005. It has been described as "over-the-top soap opera with plenty of steamy bits". It has been praised for not showing a stereotypical seme-uke relationship, and being a "damn good story about being a teenager". Patricia Beard, writing for Mania.com regarded the manga as better than the novelisation, but still enjoyed the novelisation. Michelle Smith, writing for Pop Culture Shock thought that the non-consensual scenes were worse to read about in the novelisation than in the manga, as it was "more clear" in showing Toru's pain. The second half of the novelisation is not adapted from the manga, and the boys misunderstand each other and have sex. Smith regarded the novelisation as unexciting. In 2008, Desire won an American Library Association award in the Popular Paperbacks for Young Adults division, under the category "Sex Is...".
