= Yukine Honami =

Japanese illustrator of yaoi manga

Yukine Honami 穂波 ゆきね
- Area: Artist
- Notable works: Desire, Rin!

Yukine Honami (穂波 ゆきね, Honami Yukine) is a Japanese illustrator of yaoi (boys love) manga. Her major works include Desire (written by Maki Kazumi), Sweet Revolution, Rin! (written by Satoru Kannagi), Can't Win With You!, Constellations in My Palm, Stolen Heart, and Thirsty for Love.
