= Seizō Watase =

Japanese manga artist and illustrator

- Born: 渡瀬 政造; 15 February 1945 (age 81); Kobe, Hyōgo Prefecture, Japan
- Education: Waseda University
- Known for: Manga, illustration
- Notable work: Heart Cocktail
- Awards: Shogakukan Big Comic Award (1974); Bungeishunjū Manga Award (1987)
- Website: http://www.apple-farm.co.jp/

Seizō Watase (わたせ せいぞう or 渡瀬 政造, Watase Seizō) is a Japanese manga artist and illustrator born 15 February 1945 in Kobe, Hyōgo Prefecture, Japan. Outside of being an illustrator for numerous posters, books, and other works, he is most well known for his dramatic romance manga Heart Cocktail, which had sold over 5 million copies.

He won the 1974 Shogakukan Big Comic Prize. In 1987, Watase received the Bungeishunjū Manga Award for his work Phillip, P.I. (私立探偵フィリップ, Shiritsu Tantei Firippu).

In addition to various exhibits in Japan, Watase held his first major exhibit in the United States at the Japanese American Cultural and Community Center in Los Angeles, California in 1998.

== Biography ==
From shortly after birth until high school, Watase lived in Kitakyūshū, Fukuoka Prefecture. He attended Meiji Gakuen Junior High (a private school), then graduated to the Fukuoka Prefectural Kokura Senior High School before finally graduating from Waseda University with a degree in law.

Watase was awarded the 1974 Shogakukan Big Comic Prize. His Heart Cocktail manga series, considered to be representative of his work, began publication in Kodansha's manga magazine Weekly Morning in 1983. This series ran for six years and was adapted into an anime television series aired on NTV from October 1986 until March 1988. Jazz and fusion musician Naoya Matsuoka collaborated with him on the series. The series was also adapted into a two-episode television drama special in 1986.

After working for over 16 years at Dowa Fire and Marine Insurance Company, he retired in 1985 to work on his manga and illustration. Watase received the Bungeishunjū Manga Award in 1987 for Phillip, P.I.

== Works ==
Watase has worked in a variety of formats, including manga, book illustration, concept illustration, as well as poster and advertising illustration. Some of his manga are also essays or commentary on specific topics.

=== Manga ===
- Heart Cocktail (ハートカクテル, Hāto Kokuteru) (1983, 11 volumes, Kodansha)
- A Man's Song (おとこの詩, Otoko no Uta) (1985, 1 volume, Kadokawa Shoten)
- My Oldies Are All Color (僕のオールディーズはオールカラー, Boku no Ōrudīsu wa Ōrukarā) (1985)
- Phillip, P.I. (私立探偵フィリップ, Shiritsu Tantei Firippu) (1986, 1 volume, Jitsugyo no Nihon Sha)
- Reason series (リーズン・シリーズ, Rīzun shirīzu) (1987-, Kobunsha)
  - Happy Reasons (ハッピーなリーズンたち, Happī na Rīzun-tachi) (1987)
  - 8 Beat Reasons (8ビートのリーズンたち, Hachi Bīto no Rīzun-tachi) (1989)
  - Reasons for Loving (恋するリーズンたち, Koisuru Rīzun-tachi)
- Chalk-colored People (チョーク色のピープル, Chōku-iro no Pīpuru) (1987, 1 volume, Kadokawa Shoten)
- Ken & Jun (1987–1989, 2 volumes, Takeshobo)
- A Season for Two (ふたりだけのSeason, Futari Dake no Shīzun) (1987–1989, 3 volumes, Kadokawa Shoten)
- Here and There Under the Clouds (近くそして遠い雲の下, Chikaku Soshite Tōi Kumo no Shita) (1989, 1 volume, Kadokawa Shoten)
- Hurricane (ハリケーン, Harikēn) (1989, 1 volume, Kodansha)
- Yesterdays (イエスタデイズ, Iesutadeizu) (1990, 1 volume, Kadokawa Shoten)
- Sai (菜) (1993–1998, 12 volumes, Kodansha)
- Tokyo Eden (東京エデン, Tōkyō Eden) (1999, 2 volumes, Kodansha)
- Hanadoki Road (ハナドキロード, Hanadoki Rōdo) (2000–2002, 4 volumes, Kodansha)
- Also As Edo Love (江戸恋もよう, Edo Koi mo yō) (2003–2005, 3 volumes, Kodansha)
- Tokyo Blue (2005, 1 volume, Softbank)
- Heart Cocktail Eleven (2006, 1 volume, Kodansha)
- Heart Station (2006, 1 volume, Kobunsha)
- The Motorcycle Letters (2006, 1 volume, Jitsugyo no Nihon Sha)
- Sea Side Story: 7 Harbors, 11 Loves (Sea Side Story 7つの港 11の恋, Shī Saido Sutōrī: Nanatsu no Minato Jūichi no Koi) (2006, 1 volume, Kodansha)
- Botchibon (ボッチボン) (2007, 1 volume, Kodansha)
