= Kaishain no Melody =

Manga series

- Cover of volume 5

かいしゃいんのメロディー (Kaishain no Merodī)
- Genre: Comedy
- Manga
- Written by: Tsuyoshi Ōhashi
- Published by: Takeshobo
- Magazine: Manga Club
- Original run: 1996 – 2002
- Volumes: 7

Kaishain no Melody (Japanese: かいしゃいんのメロディー, Hepburn: Kaishain no Merodī; "Office Worker's Melody") is a yonkoma Japanese manga series by Tsuyoshi Ōhashi which was serialized in Manga Club. It won the 1998 Bungeishunjū Manga Award.
