= Sou Nishimura =

Japanese manga artist

Sō Nishimura (西村 宗, Nishimura Sou); (born April 28, 1936) is a Japanese manga artist from Izumiōtsu. Nishimura's best-known work is the yonkoma comedy Sarari-kun (サラリ君, Mr. Salary), which earned Nishimura the 1985 Bungeishunjū Manga Award and the Japanese Cartoonists' Association's Excellence Prize for 2000.
