= Rin Saitō =

Japanese manga artist

Rin Saitō (斉藤 倫, Saitō Rin) is a Japanese manga artist born on May 2 in Aichi Prefecture, Japan. She is a resident of Tokyo. She made her debut in the October 1981 issue of Bessatsu Margaret.

== Works ==
- I Love the Color of the Spring Sky (春の空色がすき, Haru no Sorairo ga Suki) (1986), 1 volume, Shueisha
- Centimeter Story (せんちめえとる物語, Senchimetoru Monogatari) (1988), 1 volume, Shueisha
- Embraced by the Ocean Wind (潮風をだきしめて, Shiokaze o Dakishimete) (1988), 1 volume, Shueisha
- Orange Time (オレンジ待夢, Orenji Taimu) (1989), 1 volume, Shueisha
- PM 6:00 Studio P (1989), 2 volumes, Margaret, Shueisha
- I'm Not Scared of Onions! (タマネギなんかこわくない!, Tamanegi Nanka Kowakunai!) (1990–1991), 3 volumes, Margaret, Shueisha
- Suddenly Siblings Today (すっとんきょーな兄妹, Suttonkyō na Kyōdai) (1991–1992), 3 volumes, Shueisha
- 17Easy (1992–1993), 3 volumes, Shueisha
- The Great Unidentifiable Bomb (正体不明の大爆弾, Shōtai Fumei no Biggu Bōmu) (1993–1996), 2 volumes, Shueisha
- Let's Talk in a Hundred Million Summers (一億年後の夏の話をしよう, Ichioku Nengo no Natsu no Hanashi o Shiyō) (1994), 1 volume, Shueisha
- The World Exists for Me (世界はみんなボクの為, Sekai ha Minna Boku no Tame) (1994–1996), 6 volumes, Shueisha
- Spicy Papa (スパイシーパパ, Supaishī Papa) (1997–1998), 2 volumes,
- Happy Happy Honey!? (1998), 1 volume, Shueisha
- Verdant Feeling (緑のキモチ, Midori no Kimochi) (1999), 1 volume, Shueisha
- Within These Warm Sunbeams (このあたたかい日差しの中で, Kono Atatakai Hizashi no Naka de) (1999–2000), 2 volumes, Shueisha
- Contrails (ひこうきぐも, Hikōki Gumo) (2001–2004), 3 volumes, Shueisha
- 3 Years (August 2004), 1 volume, Shueisha
- Silver Tip (シルバー・チップ, Shirubā Chippu) (June 2005), 1 volume, Shueisha
- Making Enemies of the Entire World (世界を敵に回しても, Sekai o Teki ni Mawashite mo) (2005–2007), 4 volumes, Deluxe Margaret, Shueisha
