= Takaya Miou =

Japanese manga artist

Frame from Ribs of the Sky: Cooper's Bad Boys by Takaya Miou, 1997

Takaya Miou (高屋 未央, Takaya Miō) is a Japanese manga artist born in Nagoya, Japan. Her career began in 1991, with the self-publication of Sei Shojo Yugi. Her art blends surrealism, eroticism, fantasy, horror, as seen in the image of an almost nude disemboweled young man. She had her first solo gallery exhibition in 2016 at the Honolulu Museum of Art under the title, Visions of Gothic Angels: Japanese Manga by Takaya Miou. Her publications include:

- Endorphins, the Substance of Pleasure (決楽物質エンドルフィン), 1993
- King of Mechanics (機械仕掛けの王様, Rex ex machina), 1993
- The Great Frog Michael (御蛙), 1994
- Her, 1995
- Ribs of the Sky (空の肋骨), 1997
- The Mathematical Structure of Beautiful Faces (美貌方程式), 1997
- Holy Boys and Other Flightless Angels (無翼天使類聖少年科), 1998
- The Fountain of Death (死の泉), 1998
- Eroticize Intelligence, 1999
- Map of Sacred Pain (聖慯図), 2001
- The Madness of Heaven (天国狂), 2001
- Uranomania, 2003
- Demon Child in Hell (魔童地獄編), 2003
- Troubled Lord (欠けた王様), 2003
- Rosette, 2004
- Child Recipe Book, 2004
- A Billion Cubes of the Species (体種十億立方体), 2005
- Gabriel and Beelzebub (ガブリエルと蠅の王), 2006
- From Off My Bones, 2007
- The Lunacy Act (月狂条列), 2007
- Endorphins, the Substance of Pleasure, Vol. 1 (決楽物質エンドルフィン), 2014
- Rose Crown (薔薇ノ冠), 2014
- Endorphins, the Substance of Pleasure, Vol. 2 (決楽物質エンドルフィン), 2015
- Alexithymia (アレキシサイミア), 2015
