= Tokihiko Matsuura =

Japanese manga artist

Tokihiko Matsuura (松浦 聡彦, Matsuura Tokihiko, born April 4, 1968) is a Japanese manga artist from Mie prefecture. He has published his works in a number of Shogakukan manga magazines, including Shonen Sunday, Young Sunday, and Big Comic Superior.

His best-known published manga is Tuxedo Gin. Also, he was formerly an assistant to Tatsuya Egawa.

== Works ==
- Warp Boy (ワープボーイ)
- Tuxedo Gin (タキシード銀)
- Brave Saru s (ブレイブ猿,s)
- Rising Sun (ライジングサン). written by Buronson
- BROTHER's
- Owarai no Kami-sama (お笑いの神様). written by Dankan
- Moku no Kanpaku Sengen (モクの関白宣言)
