= Ryo Sasaki =

Japanese manga artist

Ryō Sasaki (佐々木 亮; or sometimes shortened to Sasa Ryō) is the pen name of a Japanese manga artist and illustrator, who draws comics about video games, video games characters as well as original material.

== Activities ==
- Between 1991 and 1996 Ryo Sasaki designed several comics for the Video Game Manga series "4koma Manga Kingdom", published by Futabasha. It was concluded that it was regarded as the prime writer in the editorial department of this series, and the picture has also reached the level also with the high contents of the comics itself in the series last stage.
- Then, Tomoyuki Fujinami and a pair are constructed and it is mainly engaged in development of Video Game Soft, such as original manga "Space Helper☆Ms.Yayoi" and "Sarara's Little Shop".
- In 2000, Tomoyuki Fujinami will start a series of original manga "Mansions & Dragons" which takes charge of an original. "Dark Loaders-The Devil's works -" used as the sequel is under series now. The maximum new publication is "Dark Loaders-The Devil's works-(3)" of July 25, 2005 sale.

== World of "Mandora" and "Darklo" ==
- "Mansions (meaning of Apartments) & Dragons", "Dark Loaders -The Devil's works-", "Sarara's Little Shop"... these are the comics in which the view of the world of a table talk RPG has appeared strongly.
- These three manga have a view of the world and a fundamentally common setup. Although the world of "kotonoha (meaning of "the leaf of language")" is made into the stage and it is based on a setup called that the race of orthodox Hero and an evil spirit fights, not only the depiction that made the Hero= justice side the subject but the deployment from a viewpoint by the side of the dangerous race = villain is prepared.Not extremely serious deployment but the work with which it came out dimly and agreeable deployment maintained exquisite balance.
- "Sarara's Little Shop" serves as contents which do business against various people, such as Hero and the Devil candidate student, in the world (a name is not "Kotonoha"), or venture such each one and a dungeon.

=== Mansions & Dragons ===
- The world "Kotonoha" of a sword and magic is a stage. The girl "Nuts" which aspire for Hero, and the adventure tale which the friends create. It is mainly drawn from the viewpoint by the side of Hero. A total of six volumes.Taiwan version and Thai version were also put on the market there.

=== Dark Loaders -The Devil's works- ===
- The world "Kotonoha" of a sword and magic is a stage. "Yusis" of the friend "Nuts" who determined becoming the Devil since it met with "Hero Nuts" left in order to beat the Devil again.The Devil is aimed at with girl "May" of Hero wish, managing the "Devil store" of the store for an adventure person."Yusis" is making unrequited love "Nuts".

== Works list ==
=== Video game manga ===
- Fate/hollow ataraxia Manga

=== Original works ===
- Space Helper☆Ms. Yayoi (January.1997)
- Sarara's Little Shop ~Begun a Witch's Store~ (April.2000)
- MangaTime Kirara ChikaChika Planets
- Mansions & Dragons
- Dark Loaders -The Devil's works-

=== Video game soft ===
- Sarara's Little Shop

=== Illust ===
- Moe-understand! Fantasy Visual Guide
- To Heart

Etc..
