= Tezuka Osamu Cultural Prize =

Award for manga

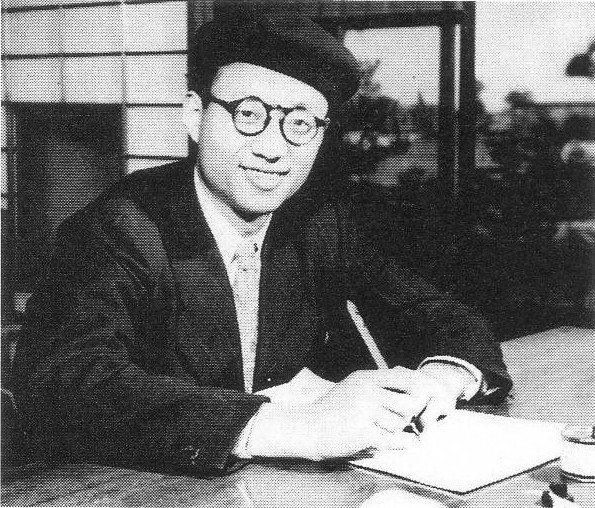
Osamu Tezuka, the prize's namesake, pictured in 1951

Named after Osamu Tezuka, the Tezuka Osamu Cultural Prize (Japanese: 手塚治虫文化賞, Hepburn: Tezuka Osamu Bunkashō) is a yearly manga prize awarded to manga artists or their works that follow the Osamu Tezuka manga approach founded and sponsored by Asahi Shimbun. The prize has been awarded since 1997, in Tokyo, Japan.

== Current prizes categories ==
- Grand Prize – for the excellent work during the year
- Creative Award – for the creator with innovative or epoch-making expression and fresh talent
- Short story Award – for the excellent work or creator of the short story
- Special Award – for the person or group who contributed to extend the culture of manga

== Prizes winners ==
=== 1997 ===
- Grand Prize: Fujiko F. Fujio for Doraemon
- Award for Excellence: Moto Hagio for A Cruel God Reigns
- Special Award: Toshio Naiki for the foundation and management of Modern Manga Library

=== 1998 ===
- Grand Prize: Jiro Taniguchi and Natsuo Sekikawa for the trilogy Bocchan No Jidai (Times of "Botchan")
- Award for Excellence: Yūji Aoki for Naniwa Kin'yūdō (The way of the Ōsaka loan shark)
- Special Award: Shotaro Ishinomori for the long years of contribution to manga

=== 1999 ===
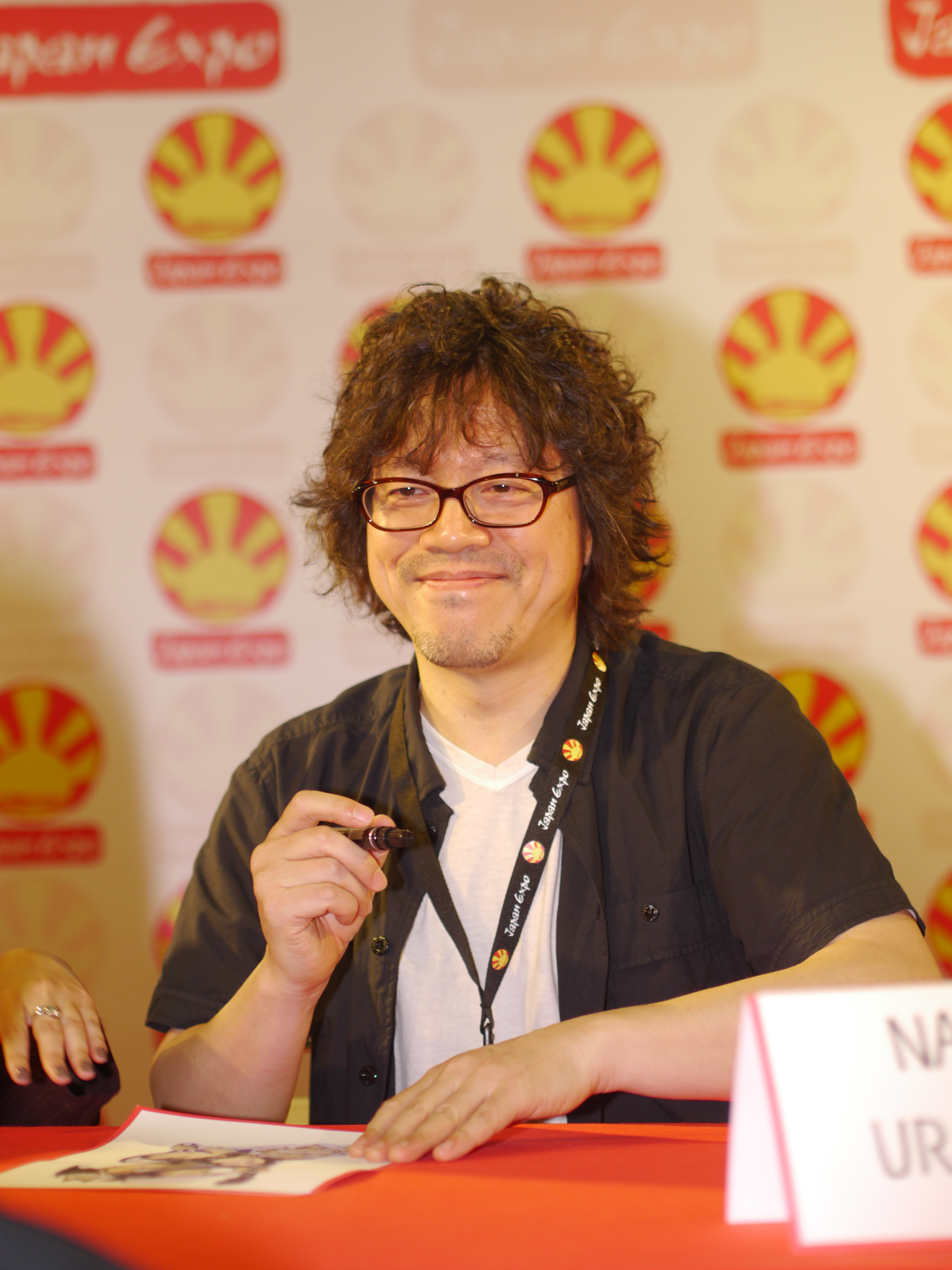
Naoki Urasawa, two-time recipient of the Grand Prize (1999, 2005)

- Grand Prize: Naoki Urasawa for Monster
- Award for Excellence: Akira Sasō for Shindō
- Special Award: Fusanosuke Natsume For outstanding achievements in manga criticism (マンガ批評の優れた業績に対して)

=== 2000 ===
- Grand Prize: Daijiro Morohoshi for Saiyū Yōenden (The Monkey King and other Chinese Legends)
- Award for Excellence: Minetarō Mochizuki for Dragon Head
- Special Award: Frederik L. Schodt for the distinguished service to introduce Japanese manga round the world

=== 2001 ===
- Grand Prize: Reiko Okano and Baku Yumemakura for Onmyōji (The Master of Shade and Light)
- Award for Excellence: Kotobuki Shiriagari for Yajikita in Deep
- Special Award: Akira Maruyuma for the valuable service to support comic artists at Tokiwa house

=== 2002 ===
- Grand Prize: Takehiko Inoue for Vagabond
- Award for Excellence: Kentaro Miura for Berserk

=== 2003 ===
- Grand Prize: Fumiko Takano for The Yellow Book: A friend Named Jacques Thibault
- Creative Award: Yumi Hotta and Takeshi Obata for Hikaru no Go
- Short story Award: Hisaichi Ishii for Gendai Shisō no Sōnanshātachi (Victims of modern ideas)
- Special Award: Shigeru Mizuki for the creative pictures and the long years of activities

=== 2004 ===
- Grand Prize: Kyoko Okazaki for Helter Skelter
- Creative Award: Takashi Morimoto for Naniwadora ihon (Variant edition of the Naniwa wastrel)
- Short story Award: Risu Akizuki for OL Shinkaron and other works
- Special Award: Tarō Minamoto for the pioneer works of historical manga and contribution to manga culture

=== 2005 ===
- Grand Prize: Naoki Urasawa, Osamu Tezuka and Takashi Nagasaki for Pluto
- Creative Award: Fumiyo Kōno for Town of Evening Calm, Country of Cherry Blossoms
- Short story Award: Rieko Saibara for Jōkyō Monogatari and Mainichi Kaasan
- Special Award: Kawasaki City Museum for the collection of manga works from Edo period to the present day, and its exhibitions

=== 2006 ===
- Grand Prize: Hideo Azuma for Disappearance Diary
- Creative Award: Asa Higuchi for Big Windup!
- Short story Award: Risa Itō for One Woman, Two Cats, Oi Piitan!! (Hey Pitan!), Onna no mado (A Woman's Window) and other works
- Special Award: Kousei Ono for the long years of the introduction of comics from abroad to Japan as a commentator for manga

=== 2007 ===
- Grand Prize: Ryoko Yamagishi for Terpsichora (The Dancing Girl; Maihime Τερψιχόρα)
- Creative Award: Nobuhisa Nozoe, Kazuhisa Iwata and Kyojin Ōnishi for Shinsei Kigeki (Divine Comedy)
- Short story Award: Hiromi Morishita for Ōsaka Hamlet

=== 2008 ===
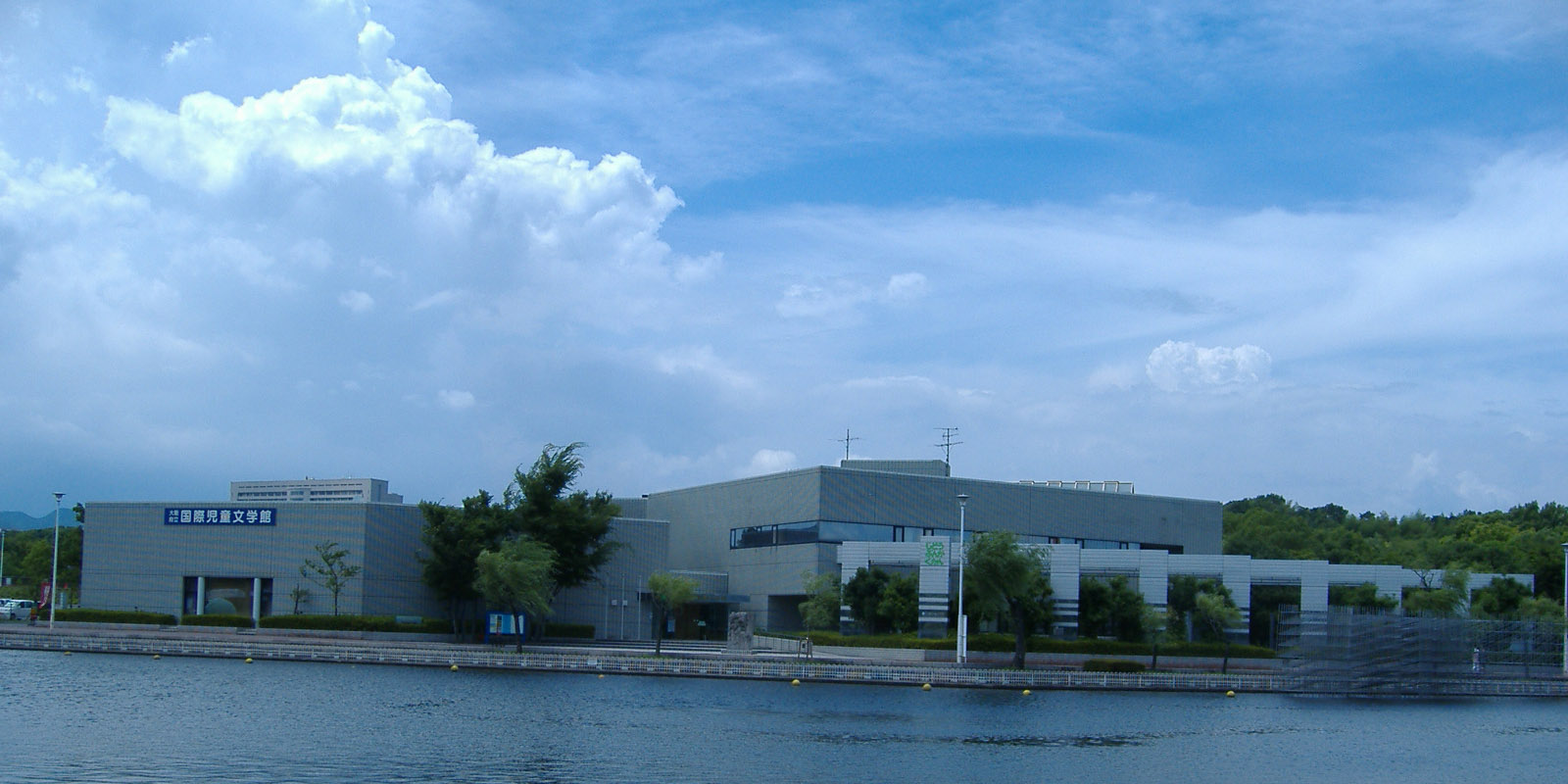
Osaka International Institute for Children's Literature, 2008 recipient of the Special Award

- Grand Prize: Masayuki Ishikawa for Moyashimon
- Creative Award: Toranosuke Shimada for Träumerei
- Short story Award: Yumiko Ōshima for GūGū Datte Neko De Aru (Cher Gou-Gou...mon petit chat, mon petit ami.)
- Special Award: International Institute for Children's Literature, Osaka Prefecture (English Official site)

=== 2009 ===
- Grand Prize: Fumi Yoshinaga for Ōoku: The Inner Chambers
- Grand Prize: Yoshihiro Tatsumi for A Drifting Life
- Short story Award: Hikaru Nakamura for Saint Young Men
- New Artist Prize: Suehiro Maruo for Panorama-tō Kitan (Anecdote of the Panorama Island)

=== 2010 ===
- Grand Prize: Yoshihiro Yamada for Hyouge Mono
- Short story Award: Mari Yamazaki for Thermae Romae
- New Artist Prize: Haruko Ichikawa for Mushi to Uta
- Special Award: Yoshihiro Yonezawa to wide achievements of the collection and the commentary activity of basic material of the cartoon research.

=== 2011 ===
- Grand Prize: Motoka Murakami for Jin
- Grand Prize: Issei Eifuku and Taiyo Matsumoto for Takemitsuzamurai
- New Artist Prize: Hiromu Arakawa for Fullmetal Alchemist
- Short Work Prize: Keisuke Yamashina for his work in creating C-kyū Salaryman Kōza, Papa wa Nanda ka Wakaranai, and other salaryman manga.

=== 2012 ===
- Grand Prize: Hitoshi Iwaaki for Historié
- New Artist Prize: Yu Itō for Shut Hell
- Short Work Prize: Roswell Hosoki for his work in creating Sake no Hosomichi, and other manga.
- Special Award: "That Weekly Shōnen Jump" – a specific copy of the magazine's 16th issue of 2011 that was shared by over 100 children at the Shiokawa Shoten bookstore in Itsutsubashi, Sendai immediately after the Great East Japan earthquake

=== 2013 ===
- Grand Prize: Yasuhisa Hara for Kingdom
- New Artist Prize: Miki Yamamoto for Sunny Sunny Ann!
- Short Work Prize: Yoshiie Gōda for Kikai-Jikake no Ai (Love of Machine)

=== 2014 ===
- Grand Prize: Chica Umino for March Comes in Like a Lion
- New Artist Prize: Machiko Kyō for Mitsuami no Kamisama
- Short Work Prize: Yūki Shikawa for Onnoji
- Special Award: Fujiko Fujio (A) for Manga Michi and Ai... Shirisomeshi Koro ni...
- Readers' Award: Chūya Koyama for Space Brothers

=== 2015 ===
- Grand Prize: Yoiko Hoshi for Aisawa Riku
- New Creator Prize: Yoshitoki Ōima for A Silent Voice
- Short Work Prize: Sensha Yoshida for his works as a whole
- Special Prize: Chikako Mitsuhashi for Chiisana Koi no Monogatari

=== 2016 ===
- Grand Prize: Kei Ichinoseki for Hanagami Sharaku and Kiyohiko Azuma for Yotsuba&!
- New Creator Prize: Yuki Andō for Machida-kun no Sekai
- Short Work Prize: Tatsuya Nakazaki for Jimihen
- Special Prize: Kyoto International Manga Museum in recognition of its 10th anniversary and its contributions to manga culture

=== 2017 ===
- Grand Prize: Fusako Kuramochi for Hana ni Somu
- New Creator Prize: Haruko Kumota for Descending Stories: Showa Genroku Rakugo Shinju
- Short Work Prize: Kahoru Fukaya for Yomawari Neko
- Special Prize: Osamu Akimoto for Kochira Katsushika-ku Kameari Kōen-mae Hashutsujo

=== 2018 ===
- Grand Prize: Satoru Noda for Golden Kamuy
- New Creator Prize: Paru Itagaki for BEASTARS
- Short Work Prize: Taro Yabe for Oya-san to Boku
- Special Prize: Tetsuya Chiba for Ashita no Joe

=== 2019 ===
- Grand Prize: Shinobu Arima for Jitterbug The Forties
- New Creator Prize: Sansuke Yamada for Areyo Hoshikuzu
- Short Work Prize: Ken Koyama for Little Miss P
- Special Prize: Takao Saito for Golgo 13 in recognition of its 50th anniversary

=== 2020 ===
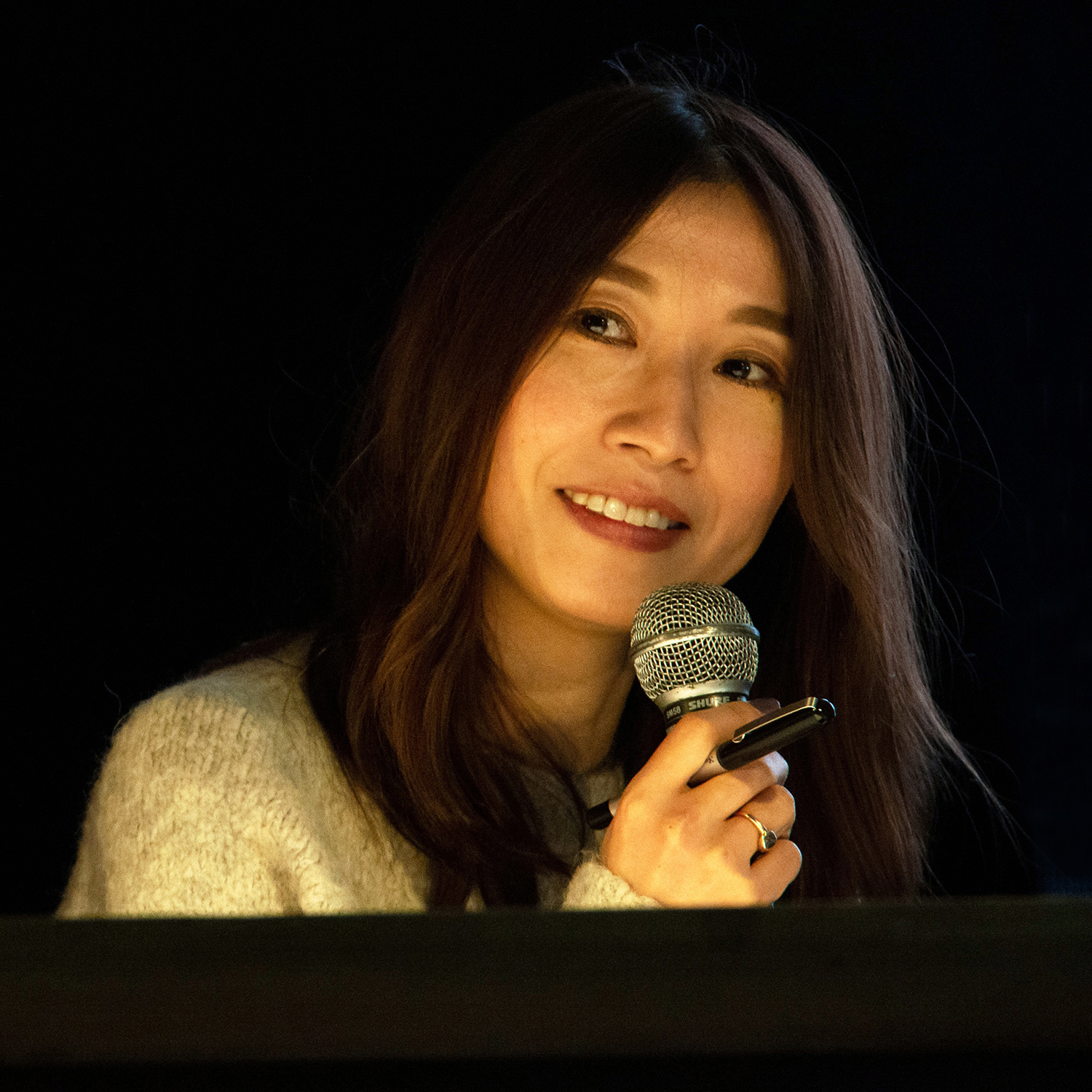
Kan Takahama, 2020 recipient of the Grand Prize

- Grand Prize: Kan Takahama for Nyx no Lantern
- New Creator Prize: Rettō Tajima for Mizu wa Umi ni Mukatte Nagareru
- Short Work Prize: Yama Wayama for Captivated, by You
- Special Prize: Machiko Hasegawa in recognition of what would have been her 100th birthday on January 20

=== 2021 ===
- Grand Prize: Kazumi Yamashita for Land
- New Creator Prize: Kanehito Yamada and Tsukasa Abe for Frieren: Beyond Journey's End
- Short Work Prize: Hiroko Nobara for Kieta Mama Tomo and Tsuma wa Kuchi o Kiite Kuremasen
- Special Prize: Koyoharu Gotouge for creating a social phenomenon with Demon Slayer: Kimetsu no Yaiba

=== 2022 ===
- Grand Prize: Uoto for Orb: On the Movements of the Earth
- New Creator Prize: Natsuko Taniguchi for Kyōshitsu no Katasumi de Seishun wa Hajimaru and Konya Sukiyaki da yo
- Short Work Prize: Izumi Okaya for Ii Toshi o and Hakumokuren wa Kirei ni Chiranai

=== 2023 ===
- Grand Prize: Kiwa Irie for Yuria-sensei no Akai Ito
- New Creator Prize: Ganpu for Danchōtei Nichijō
- Short Work Prize: Ebine Yamaji for Onna no Ko ga Iru Basho wa
- Special Prize: Kazuo Umezu for Zoku Shingo: Chiisana Robot Shingo Bijutsukan

=== 2024 ===
- Grand Prize: Mari Yamazaki, Miki Tori for PLINIVS
- New Creator Prize: Akihito Sakaue for Kanda Gokura-chō Shokunin-Banashi
- Short Work Prize: Miri Masuda for Tsuyukusa Natsuko no Isshō
- Special Prize: COMITIA for contributing to the cultural spread of manga.

=== 2025 ===
- Grand Prize: Rintaro for 1-byō 24-koma no Boku no Jinsei
- New Creator Prize: Shiho Kido for When the Chameleon Flowers Bloom
- Short Work Prize: Shunji Enomoto for The Kinks

=== 2026 ===
- Grand Prize: Ao Kojima for Hon Nara Uru Hodo
- New Creator Prize: Mado Saitō for Kaijū o Kaibō Suru
- Short Work Prize: Kawajirō for Atarashii Tomodachi: Kawajirō Tanpenshū
- Special Prize: Kazuyoshi Takeda for Peleliu: Guernica of Paradise

== See also ==
- List of manga awards
- Tezuka Award
