= 100 Meters (manga) =

Japanese manga series and anime film

- First tankōbon volume cover

ひゃくえむ。 (Hyakuemu)
- Genre: Sports (track and field); Sports drama
- Manga
- Written by: Uoto
- Published by: Kodansha
- English publisher: NA: Nakama Press
- Imprint: KC Deluxe
- Magazine: Magazine Pocket
- Original run: November 6, 2018 – August 6, 2019
- Volumes: 5
- Anime film
- Directed by: Kenji Iwaizawa
- Produced by: Yūsuke Terada; Yūki Katayama; Akane Taketsugu
- Written by: Yasuyuki Mutō
- Music by: Hiroaki Tsutsumi
- Studio: Rock 'n' Roll Mountain
- Licensed by: GKIDS
- Released: June 12, 2025 (Annecy); September 19, 2025 (Japan); October 10, 2025 (North America); October 13, 2025 (Australia); December 31, 2025 (Worldwide)
- Runtime: 106 minutes
- icon

100 Meters (Note: Japanese: ひゃくえむ。, Hepburn: Hyakuemu) is a Japanese sports manga series written and illustrated by Uoto. The story follows a prodigious sprinter named Togashi, whose life becomes intertwined with Komiya, a socially isolated transfer student he introduces to sprinting, unknowingly creating his biggest rival. The manga was originally based on a one-shot called 100'M, it was later serialized online via Kodansha's Magazine Pocket website from November 2018 to August 2019, and was later collected into five tankōbon volumes.

An anime film adaptation, produced by Rock 'n' Roll Mountain and directed by Kenji Iwaizawa had its world premiere on June 12 at the 2025 Annecy International Animation Film Festival, followed by a release in Japan on September 19, a limited United States release on October 12, and a limited Australian release on October 16. The film released globally for streaming on Netflix on December 31, 2025. The film features the voice talents of Tori Matsuzaka, Shota Sometani, Kenjiro Tsuda, and Koki Uchiyama. It was licensed for an English-language release in North America by GKIDS and in Australia by Sugoi Co.

The film received positive reviews, with critics praising its rotoscoped animation style, and the score of Hiroaki Tsutsumi. The film was also nominated for several awards, including Animation of the Year at the 49th Japan Academy Film Prize.

== Plot ==
The story focuses on Togashi, a sprinter regarded as one of the fastest grade schoolers in Japan. A transfer student named Komiya is later introduced to his class. Togashi catches Komiya the next day and asks him why he runs. Komiya explains that he feels he has nothing and doesn't get along with people, so he runs because it allows him to escape from reality. Togashi says that being the fastest runner can solve Komiya's problems, as it does for him, and that it is up to Komiya to make that happen.

Togashi starts training Komiya after school, and Komiya begins to improve, but Togashi is concerned about how obsessed Komiya becomes. On Sports Day, Togashi wins his race, while in Komiya's race, he has a strong start but falls soon after. With Togashi cheering him on, Komiya gets up and makes a frantic dash to the finish line, winning his first-ever race. Togashi is invited to an interview alongside Nigami, a star junior high runner. They race, and Nigami is surprised by how good Togashi is, despite the age difference. Later, Komiya asks Togashi for a race, and Togashi agrees. Togashi takes an early lead, but Komiya has a final burst that gives him the win. Komiya says goodbye and limps away, having injured himself during the race. The next day, they are told that Komiya had to move because of his family, much to Togashi's surprise.

Togashi is now in high school and won the junior high championships for the 100 metres all three years, but his performance has declined recently because of pressure. He meets Asakusa, who tries to recruit him for the track and field club to save it from being shut down. At first, he refuses, but after talking with her more, he changes his mind. He feels inspired again by helping the club, but they need one more runner for a relay that they must win to keep the club alive. They end up recruiting Nigami, who has quit sprinting after a back injury and mounting pressure to perform but is reinvigorated after racing Togashi again. They race Nigami's former rivals and end up getting second place, but the club gets to continue anyway.

Komiya ends up going to Nishizawa High, a school known for track and field and the former school of the national champion Zaitsu. Komiya meets Zaitsu, who gives him advice, and Komiya tells Zaitsu he wants to beat his national record. Komiya ends up beating Tsuneda, his team captain, to advance to the national high school championship. Nigami ends up qualifying for the championship as well but is defeated by Komiya in his heat. Heavy rain falls during the final, and even though Togashi is the favorite, Komiya ends up winning, leaving Togashi shocked in the rain.

Ten years later, Togashi runs an agency but has struggled to produce results. He talks with his senior, Kaido, who asks what he is racing for. Feeling inspired after reflecting on Kaido's words, Togashi realizes that he wants to race Komiya again. After a series of wins, he finally qualifies for the national championship. However, his momentum is brought to a halt after he suffers a muscle strain during practice. His doctor recommends that he stop running and rest until next season, but his agency warns him that his contract will be terminated if he does not run in the championship next week. Seeing this as his final chance, he decides to compete.

At the championship, Togashi wins his semifinal heat, with Kabaki finishing second. In a surprise finish, Kaido ends up winning his heat, with Komiya in second. Zaitsu is eliminated, and he announces his retirement afterward. The final race arrives, with everyone preparing in their own way. They line up, and the race starts, with Kabaki, Kaido, Komiya, and Togashi coming out ahead. Togashi and Komiya take the lead and reminisce about when they raced as kids. The final shot shows them both smiling as they cross the line, with the winner left unclear.

== Characters ==
Togashi (トガシ)
Voiced by: Tori Matsuzaka, Atsumi Tanezaki (young) (Japanese); Joe Zieja, Oscar Cordova (young) (English)
A naturally talented runner who has been famous since grade school for his potential. He dominates the 100 meter throughout junior high, but starts to decline with the mounting pressure on him. After his loss to Komiya, he struggles the next ten years to produce results, doubting himself and unsure what he is racing for. He eventually finds his purpose and goes all out to beat Komiya.
Komiya (小宮)
Voiced by: Shota Sometani, Aoi Yūki (young) (Japanese); Mark Whitten, Eli Huresky (young) (English)
An outcast who struggles to fit in, he becomes obsessed with sprinting after meeting Togashi. He recovers from his injury throughout junior high and starts sprinting again in high school. He has anxiety related to his injury, but he eventually overcomes it to beat Togashi. He is obsessed with chasing records, not thinking about anything else.
Zaitsu (財津)
Voiced by: Koki Uchiyama (Japanese); David Cui Cui (English)
The current national record holder and most famous sprinter in Japan. He is an alumnus of the Nishizawa high school that Komiya attends. He has been labeled the undisputed champion of Japanese sprinting, but has become bored with no one to challenge him.
Nigami (仁神)
Voiced by: Jun Kasama (Japanese); Adin Rudd (English)
Became famous as a junior high runner and is the son of a famous athlete. He stops racing because of a back injury and the pressure of fulfilling his family reputation. He lives as a shut-in until Togashi and Asakusa convince him to join their relay, which reinvigorates his passion for the sport.
Kaidō (海棠)
Voiced by: Kenjiro Tsuda (Japanese); Matthew Waterson (English)
An older sprinter at the same agency as Togashi. He has always been second to Zaitsu and has continued to try and overcome him, tired of living in his shadow. He has an intense personality, but is supportive of Togashi.
Asakusa (浅草)
Voiced by: Rie Takahashi (Japanese); Sam Philyaw (English)
A kind and talkative runner who convinces Togashi to join the track and field club at Iwani Daini high school. Despite not being as talented as Togashi, she supports him and helps him find his rhythm with sprinting again as part of the track and field club.
Kabaki (樺木)
Voiced by: Yuma Uchida (Japanese); Alejandro Antonio Ruiz (English)
A fellow sprinter at the same agency as Togashi. He secretly hopes that Togashi gets his rhythm back so they can compete. Despite being younger, he is on the same level as Kaido and Togashi.
Tsuneda (経田)
Voiced by: Haruki Ishiya (Japanese); Christopher Trindade (English)
A second year at Nishizawa high and captain of the track team. He struggles seeing Komiya so successful, especially with his unconventional form. He gets eliminated from competing at the national high school championships by Komiya.
Onomichi (尾道)
Voiced by: Tomokazu Sugita (Japanese); Ben Levin (English)
A runner at Nigami's former school who has been overshadowed by Nigami his entire career. He is the self-proclaimed rival of Nigami and competes against him in the relay.
Morikawa (森川)
Voiced by: Hiiro Ishibashi (Japanese); Allen Winter (English)
A young athlete who won the high school nationals while Togashi is an adult. He was inspired by Togashi to take up running and makes it to the national championship, losing to Togashi and Kabaki in his heat.
Shiina (椎名)
Voiced by: Yuki Tanaka (Japanese); Glory Curda (English)
A friend of Asakusa and the other girl in the track club at Iwani Daini high. She serves as the second runner in the relay.
Numano (沼野)
Voiced by: Junya Enoki (Japanese); Alan Lee (English)
A first year of the Nishizawa track team who is friendly with Komiya.

== Media ==
=== Manga ===
Written and illustrated by Uoto, 100 Meters was serialized on Kodansha's Magazine Pocket website and app from November 6, 2018, to August 6, 2019. Its chapters were collected into five tankōbon volumes from June 7 to October 9, 2019.

In October 2026, Mad Cave Studios' imprint Nakama Press announced that they had licensed the series for English publication, with the first volume set to release in February 2027.

| No. | Release date | ISBN |
|---|---|---|
| 1 | June 7, 2019 | 978-4-06-516405-1 |
| 2 | July 9, 2019 | 978-4-06-516439-6 |
| 3 | August 9, 2019 | 978-4-06-516441-9 |
| 4 | September 9, 2019 | 978-4-06-516440-2 |
| 5 | October 9, 2019 | 978-4-06-516883-7 |

==== Development ====
Uoto first became interested in sprinting after watching the 100 meters at the Brazilian 2016 Rio Olympics. After witnessing a runner being disqualified for a false start and pondering the implications, he felt inspired by the intensity of the sport. Uoto won an honorable mention in the 2016 Magazine Grand Prix from Kodansha's Weekly Shonen Magazine for his manga about rapping called Punchline, going on to then publish the one-shot 100'M, which served as the predecessor for 100 Meters. 100'M would go on to win a Special Encouragement Award at the 97th Weekly Shonen Magazine Newcomer Manga Awards. 100 Meters became Uoto's first serialization through the Magazine Pocket website from Kodansha. Following a tweet, the increase in online readership prompted Kodansha to publish 100 Meters in five collected tankōbon volumes.

=== Anime film ===
North American theatrical release poster

An anime film adaptation was announced by the Annecy International Animation Film Festival on May 24, 2024. The film was animated by Rock 'n' Roll Mountain, produced by Pony Canyon, TBS, Asmik Ace and GKIDS, and directed by Kenji Iwaizawa, with characters designed by Keisuke Kojima and music composed by Hiroaki Tsutsumi. The film's theme song is "Rashisa" performed by Official Hige Dandism.

The film had its world premiere on June 12 at the 2025 Annecy International Animation Film Festival. It was released in Japan by Pony Canyon and Asmik Ace on September 19, 2025. GKIDS licensed the film for an official English release, recording a full English dub. The film was first screened in Los Angeles on October 10, 2025, with a wider North American release following from October 12-14. In Australia, the film was distributed by Sugoi Co with a premiere on October 13, 2025, with a wider release following from October 16. The film was later released globally for streaming on Netflix starting December 31, 2025.

==== Production ====
Unlike Iwaizawa's previous film, On-Gaku: Our Sound, which was produced by a small team of animators with little industry experience over a 7-year time frame, 100 Meters was made with a large team of experienced animators. The film primarily relied on an animation technique known as rotoscoping, in which animators use reference film of a scene to animate motion in a more "life-like" way. Iwaizawa had directed the actors used in the reference footage, and citied his experience from his background in live action film composition as contributing to the "unique" feel of the film. In addition to this technique, the film also includes a long take shot that lasts three minutes and forty seconds, made up of 9800 frames that took over a year to animate. To help with the authenticity, the production team also interviewed Japanese professional sprinter Ippei Takeda to get a real athlete's perspective and better understand their behaviors.

== Reception ==
=== Box office ===
100 Meters was released in Japan on September 19, 2025, with an opening weekend of ¥102,666,040 or US$693,848, ranking number 8 in Japan that weekend. It would go on to earn ¥470M or US$3,034,548 during its run in Japan. The film had a limited release domestically through GKIDS October 12-14, 2025, earning US$62,131 opening day and US$140,991 gross. The film would end with a worldwide gross of US$3,611,916.

The film was released for streaming on Netflix on December 31, 2025. Netflix announced that 100 Meters ranked number 6 over the week between December 29 and January 4 for the global top 10 list of non-English films, amassing 15,000,000 views in that time. The film was also ranked in the top 10 films overall for that week in Japan, Thailand, Taiwan, and Hong Kong.

=== Critical reception ===
On the review aggregator website Rotten Tomatoes, 100% of 18 critics' reviews are positive. Metacritic, which uses a weighted average, assigned the film a score of 72 out of 100, based on 5 critics, indicating "generally favorable" reviews.

The film had received generally positive reviews from critics. Phuong Lee from The Guardian rated the film 3 out of 5, writing "what 100 Meters lacks in narrative subtlety and pacing, it makes up for in dazzling visuals." He would go on to praise the running sequences and the use of rotoscoping to add detail and bring out the physical exertion of the sport. William Bibbiani of TheWrap called 100 Meters a "winner" and praises the exploration of existentialism and the inner struggle of being an athlete throughout the film. Kevin Cormack of Anime News Network likens the film's rotoscoped animation to that of The First Slam Dunk by Takehiko Inoue, pointing to the latter as a benchmark for how the technique can be used to great success. The film was included in the top ten list of 2025 for Ally Johnson of RogerEbert.com.

Steven Scaife of Slant Magazine praised the use of varied techniques to capture the thrill of the sport, in particular the oner shot in the rain. Blake Simons of the British Film Institute was more critical. He praised the score of Hiroaki Tsutsumi, calling it a "hair-raising, blood-pumping blast of brass and synth," but criticized the action for it being "dull and predictable." Matt Schley of The Japan Times would similarly praise the use of rotoscoping, attributing it to the "naturalistic style rarely seen in anime," as well as the use of varied animation techniques during the sprint sequences to build tension. Schley also discusess the film's loss of narrative focus when it shifts attention from Togashi and Komiya to secondary characters like Kaido and Zaitsu, arguing that their extended philosophical monologues distracted viewers from the central rivalry.

=== Accolades ===
| Award | Year | Category | Recipient(s) | Result | Ref. |
|---|---|---|---|---|---|
| Aichi Nagoya International Animation Film Festival | December 17, 2025 | Iris Prize | Kenji Iwaisawa | Won | |
| Aichi Nagoya International Animation Film Festival | December 17, 2025 | AkaShachi Award (audience voted) | 100 Meters | Won | |
| Crunchyroll Anime Awards | May 23, 2026 | Film of the Year | 100 Meters | Nominated | |
| Florida Film Critics Circle Awards | December 19, 2025 | Best Animated Film | 100 Meters | Runner-up | |
| Hochi Film Awards | December 2, 2025 | Best Animated Picture | 100 Meters | Nominated | |
| Japan Academy Film Prize | March 13, 2026 | Animation of the Year | 100 Meters | Nominated | |
| Japan Expo Awards | July 10, 2026 | Daruma for Best Feature Film | 100 Meters | Nominated | |
| Japan Expo Awards | July 10, 2026 | Daruma for Best Action Anime | 100 Meters | Nominated | |
| New York Film Critics Circle Awards | December 2, 2025 | Best Animated Film | 100 Meters | Nominated | |
| Tokyo Anime Award Festival | March 16, 2026 | Best Original Story / Screenplay | Uoto | Won | |

== See also ==
- Orb: On the Movements of the Earth - another series by the same author
- On-Gaku: Our Sound - another film by the same director
- Run with the Wind
- Suzuka
