= Jōkyō Monogatari =

Japanese manga

- Tankōbon volume cover

上京ものがたり
- Manga
- Written by: Rieko Saibara
- Published by: Shogakukan
- Magazine: Big Comic Superior
- Original run: 2003 – 2004
- Volumes: 1
- Live-action film
- Directed by: Toshiyuki Morioka
- Written by: Toshiyuki Morioka
- Released: August 2013
- icon

Jōkyō Monogatari (Japanese: 上京ものがたり; lit. 'Going to Tokyo Story') is a Japanese autobiographical manga written and illustrated by Rieko Saibara. It was serialized in Shogakukan's seinen manga magazine Big Comic Spirits from 2003 to 2004, with its chapters collected in a single tankōbon volume. A live-action film adaptation premiered in 2013.

In 2005, the manga, along with Mainichi Kaasan, won the Tezuka Osamu Cultural Prize's Short Story Award.

== Cast ==
- Kii Kitano as Natsumi Takahara
- Fumino Kimura
- Asuka Kurosawa
- Ittoku Kishibe
- Asaka Seto

== Media ==
=== Manga ===
Written and illustrated by Rieko Saibara, Jōkyō Monogatari was serialized in Shogakukan's seinen manga magazine Big Comic Superior from 2003 to 2004. (Note: It started in the magazine's 22nd issue of 2003, released on October 17 of that same year.) Shogakukan collected its chapters in a single tankōbon volume, released on November 24, 2004.

=== Live-action film ===
A live-action film adaptation premiered on August 24, 2013.

== Reception ==
In 2005, the manga, along with Mainichi Kaasan, won the Tezuka Osamu Cultural Prize's Short story Award.
