= Olympia Kyklos =

Japanese manga series

- First tankōbon volume cover

オリンピア・キュクロス (Orinpia Kyukurosu)
- Genre: Comedy
- Manga
- Written by: Mari Yamazaki
- Published by: Shueisha
- Magazine: Grand Jump
- Original run: March 20, 2018 – July 6, 2022
- Volumes: 7
- Anime television series

Bessatsu Olympia Kyklos
- Directed by: Ryō Fujii
- Written by: Ryō Fujii; Atsushi Tsuboi; Takeshi Takemura
- Studio: Gosay Studio
- Licensed by: Crunchyroll
- Original network: Tokyo MX
- Original run: April 20, 2020 – November 2, 2020
- Episodes: 24

Olympia Kyklos (Japanese: オリンピア・キュクロス, Hepburn: Orinpia Kyukurosu) is a Japanese comedy manga series by Mari Yamazaki. It was serialized in Shueisha's seinen manga magazine Grand Jump from March 2018 to July 2022, with its chapters collected in seven tankōbon volumes. An anime television series adaptation titled Bessatsu Olympia Kyklos aired from April to November 2020.

== Plot ==
Demetrios, a timid and kindhearted pottery painter, lives in ancient Greece and dislikes sports and competition. One day his village is challenged by the mayor of a neighboring town to save his village, Demetrios panics and hides inside a large clay pot, only to be struck by lightning. He is transported to Tokyo in 1964, which is hosting the 1964 Summer Olympics. There, he is taken in by a modern Japanese family who assume he is a harmless foreigner, allowing him to observe contemporary society and athletic events firsthand.

Each time Demetrios is struck by lightning, he travels back and forth between ancient Greece and modern Japan, bringing with him ideas inspired by modern sports. Applying this knowledge to his own era, he gradually gains confidence, earns the respect of his fellow villagers, and helps introduce new forms of competition.

== Characters ==
Demetrios (デメトリオス)
Voiced by: Daisuke Ono
Theophilus, the Head of the Village (テオフィロス)
Voiced by: Jin Katagiri
Professor Asakichi Iwaya (巌谷浅吉)
Voiced by: Takashi Satō

== Media ==
=== Manga ===
Written and illustrated by Mari Yamazaki, Olympia Kyklos was serialized in Shueisha's seinen manga magazine Grand Jump from March 20, 2018, to July 6, 2022. Its chapters were collected in seven tankōbon published from July 19, 2018, to September 16, 2022.

No.	Japanese release date	Japanese ISBN
1	July 19, 2018	978-4-08-891079-6
2	December 19, 2018	978-4-08-891159-5
3	July 19, 2019	978-4-08-891330-8
4	February 19, 2020	978-4-08-891521-0
5	April 19, 2021	978-4-08-891606-4
6	August 18, 2021	978-4-08-892040-5
7	September 16, 2022	978-4-08-892258-4

=== Anime ===
An anime television series adaptation was announced in the 11th issue of Weekly Shōnen Jump magazine on February 10, 2020. The clay-animated short series, titled Bessatsu Olympia Kyklos (別冊オリンピア・キュクロス, Bessatsu Orinpia Kyukurosu), is directed by Ryō Fujii, with Fujii, Atsushi Tsuboi and Takeshi Takemura handling series composition. It aired from April 20 to November 2, 2020, on Tokyo MX. Crunchyroll has licensed the anime for streaming. On May 4, 2020, it was announced that episode 5 and later episodes would be delayed due to the ongoing COVID-19 pandemic. It returned on June 22, 2020.

No.	Title	Original release date
1	"You are Hellenese" "Kimi wa Herenesu" (君はヘレネス)	April 20, 2020
2	"ZE.N.RA" (ZE.N.RA)	April 27, 2020
3	"A Man's Arete" "Otoko no Arētē" (男のアレーテー)	May 4, 2020
4	"It Always Starts with Zeus" "Hajimari wa Itsumo Zeusu" (始まりはいつもゼウス)	May 11, 2020
5	"The Aegean Sea of Tears" "Namida no Ēge Umi" (涙のエーゲ海)	June 22, 2020
6	"Symposium Tonight" "Konya wa Shinpojion" (今夜はシンポジオン)	June 29, 2020
7	"Sweet Olympia" "Suīto Orinpia" (スイート・オリンピア)	July 6, 2020
8	"Endless Summer" "Endoresu Samā" (エンドレスサマー)	July 13, 2020
9	"Build a Tropaion!" "Tatero! Toropaion" (立てろ! トロパイオン)	July 20, 2020
10	"Spartans are Scary" "Suparuta jin Kowai" (スパルタ人こわい)	July 27, 2020
11	"Different Country, Different Face" "Kokugai de wa Betsu no Kao" (国外では別の顔)	August 3, 2020
12	"Goodbye Sparta" "Sayōnara Suparuta" (さようならスパルタ)	August 10, 2020
13	"Lady Discrimination" (LADY discrimination)	August 17, 2020
14	"What is Your Thlon" "Kimi wa nan Suron" (君は何スロン)	August 24, 2020
15	"Market of Dreams" "Yume no Mātto" (夢のマーット)	August 31, 2020
16	"Cheater" "Zurui Hito" (ずるい皇帝 [ひと])	September 7, 2020
17	"Your Pessoi" "Kimi no Pessoi" (君のぺッソイ)	September 14, 2020
18	"The Philosopher's Dinner Table" "Tetsugakumono no Shokutaku" (哲学者の食卓)	September 21, 2020
19	"Herma! Herma! Herma!" "Heruma! Heruma! Heruma!" (ヘルマ! ヘルマ! ヘルマ!)	September 28, 2020
20	"Burning Fire" (BURNING FIRE)	October 5, 2020
21	"Villager A" "Murabito A" (村人A)	October 12, 2020
22	"Your White Lie" "Kimi no Shiroi Uso" (君の白い嘘)	October 19, 2020
23	"When We Say Goodbye..." "Sayonara no Ori ni" (サヨナラの折に)	October 26, 2020
24	"The Tolympics" "Torinpikku" (トリンピック)	November 2, 2020

== See also ==
- Thermae Romae – Another manga series by the same author
