= Tsuyukusa Natsuko no Isshō =

Japanese manga series

- Cover of the volume

ツユクサナツコの一生
- Manga
- Written by: Miri Masuda
- Published by: Shinchosha
- Imprint: Bunch Comics
- Magazine: Shōsetsu Shinchō
- Original run: March 22, 2021 – November 22, 2022
- Volumes: 1

Tsuyukusa Natsuko no Isshō (ツユクサナツコの一生) is a Japanese manga series written and illustrated by Miri Masuda. It was serialized in Shinchosha's Shōsetsu Shinchō magazine from March 2021 to November 2022.

The series won the 28th Tezuka Osamu Cultural Prize in the Short Work Category in 2024.

== Synopsis ==
The series is set during the COVID-19 pandemic and is centered around the life of 32-year-old manga artist Natsuko Tsuyukusa.

== Publication ==
Written and illustrated by Miri Masuda, Tsuyukusa Natsuko no Isshō was serialized in Shinchosha's Shōsetsu Shinchō magazine from March 22, 2021, to November 22, 2022. Its chapters were compiled into a single wideban volume released on June 29, 2023.

No.	Release date	ISBN
1	June 29, 2023	978-4-10-351982-9

== Reception ==
The series was ranked fourth in Da Vinci's "Book of the Year" list in 2023. The series was also ranked thirteenth in Freestyle Magazine's "The Best Manga 2024" ranking in 2023. The series won the Short Work Prize at the 28th Tezuka Osamu Cultural Prize in 2024.
