= Yomawari Neko =

Japanese manga series

- First tankōbon volume cover (Kodansha edition)

夜廻り猫
- Manga
- Written by: Kaoru Fukaya
- Published by: Enterbrain (2016); Kodansha (2017–present)
- Magazine: ComicWalker (February 22, 2016 – July 12, 2016); Moae (March 23, 2017 – October 14, 2022); Comic Days (October 17, 2022 – present)
- Original run: October 22, 2015 – present
- Volumes: 12
- Anime television series
- Directed by: Kazuma Taketani
- Written by: Hiroko Kanasugi
- Music by: Kenichi Maeyamada
- Studio: Shogakukan Music & Digital Entertainment
- Original network: NHK General TV
- Original run: March 21, 2023 – March 27, 2023
- Episodes: 15

Yomawari Neko (Japanese: 夜廻り猫; lit. 'Night Watch Cat') is a Japanese manga series written and illustrated by Kaoru Fukaya. Originally published on the author's Twitter account in October 2015, the series was initially acquired by Enterbrain, who published the first tankōbon volume in June 2016, and later by Kodansha who re-released the volume and continued its publication. As of May 2026, the series has been collected into twelve volumes. An anime television series adaptation produced by Shogakukan Music & Digital Entertainment aired in March 2023.

The manga won the Short Story Award at the 21st Tezuka Osamu Cultural Prize.

== Characters ==
Heizō Endō (遠藤 平蔵, Endō Heizō)
Voiced by: Takayuki Yamada
Jūrō (重郎)
Voiced by: Atsumi Tanezaki

== Media ==
=== Manga ===
Written and illustrated by Kaoru Fukaya, Yomawari Neko started on the author's Twitter account on October 22, 2015. It was later serialized on Kadokawa's ComicWalker website from February 22, 2016, to July 12, 2016. Enterbrain initially published the first tankōbon volume on June 30, 2016. Kodansha released a new edition of the first volume on March 23, 2017, and continued publishing subsequent volumes. The manga continued its serialization on Kodansha's Moae manga platform on the same day, until October 14, 2022. It moved to the blog of the Comic Days platform's editorial department on October 17, 2022. As of May 2026, twelve volumes have been released.

==== Volumes ====
No.	Japanese release date	Japanese ISBN
1	June 30, 2016 (Enterbrain); March 23, 2017 (Kodansha)	978-4-04-734178-4 (Enterbrain); 978-4-06-337859-7 (Kodansha)
2	March 23, 2017	978-4-06-337860-3
3	November 22, 2017	978-4-06-510522-1
4	July 23, 2018	978-4-06-511703-3
5	April 23, 2019	978-4-06-515185-3
6	November 22, 2019	978-4-06-517779-2; 978-4-06-517781-5 (special edition)
7	December 23, 2020	978-4-06-521769-6
8	November 22, 2021	978-4-06-525774-6
9	November 22, 2022	978-4-06-529696-7
10	November 22, 2023	978-4-06-533702-8
11	December 23, 2024	978-4-06-537815-1
12	May 22, 2026	978-4-06-543155-9

=== Anime ===
An anime television series adaptation was announced on November 22, 2022. It is produced by Shogakukan Music & Digital Entertainment and directed by Kazuma Taketani, with scripts written by Hiroko Kanasugi, and music composed by Kenichi Maeyamada. The series consists of 15 episodes, with the first five episodes premiering on March 21, 2023; episodes 6–10 on March 24; 11–12 on March 26; and 13–15 on March 27, 2023, on NHK General TV. A cover version of Kiyoshiro Imawano's "Jump" served as the theme song.

== Reception ==
By November 2022, Yomawari Neko had sold over 630,000 copies.

The series was nominated in the manga category at the 2017 Sugoi Japan Awards. It also ranked 25th on the 2016 "Book of the Year" list by Da Vinci magazine. In 2017, the manga won the Short Story Award at the 21st Tezuka Osamu Cultural Prize.
