= Konya Sukiyaki da yo =

Japanese manga series

- Cover of the volume

今夜すきやきだよ
- Genre: Cooking; Romance; Slice of life
- Manga
- Written by: Natsuko Taniguchi
- Published by: Shinchosha
- Imprint: Bunch Comics
- Magazine: Yom Yom; (November 15, 2019 – March 19, 2021); Kurage Bunch; (April 2 – July 2, 2021)
- Original run: November 15, 2019 – July 2, 2021
- Volumes: 1
- Television drama
- Directed by: Ryo Ohta; Yôko Yamanaka
- Written by: Tatsuya Yamanishi
- Music by: Kaori Sawada
- Studio: TV Tokyo; The Works
- Original network: TV Tokyo
- Original run: January 7, 2023 – March 24, 2023
- Episodes: 12

Konya Sukiyaki da yo (今夜すきやきだよ) is a Japanese manga series written and illustrated by Natsuko Taniguchi. It was initially serialized in Shinchosha's Yom Yom magazine from November 2019 to March 2021. It was later transferred to the Kurage Bunch website where it ran from April to July 2021. A live-action television drama adaptation aired from January to March 2023.

The series won the New Creator Prize at the 26th Tezuka Osamu Cultural Prize in 2022.

== Synopsis ==
Aiko Ota is bad at housework but wants to get married. Tomoko Asano likes housework but isn't really interested in marriage.

The two women in their late twenties with completely opposite views on marriage live together and contemplate what a "normal marriage" truly means through home-cooked meals.

== Characters ==
Aiko Ota (太田あいこ, Ōta Aiko)
Portrayed by: Misako Renbutsu
Tomoko Asano (浅野ともこ, Asano Tomoko)
Portrayed by: Reina Triendl

== Media ==
=== Manga ===
Written and illustrated by Natsuko Taniguchi, Konya Sukiyaki da yo was initially serialized on Shinchosha's Yom Yom magazine from November 15, 2019, to March 19, 2021. It was later transferred to the Kurage Bunch website where it ran from April 2 to July 2, 2021. The series' chapters were collected into a single tankōbon volume released on September 9, 2021.

No.	Release date	ISBN
1	September 9, 2021	978-4-10-772422-9

=== Drama ===
A live-action television drama adaptation was announced on December 1, 2022. The drama starred Misako Renbutsu and Reina Triendl in lead roles. The drama aired on TV Tokyo's "Drama 24" programming block from January 7 to March 24, 2023. The ending theme song "Hunter" was performed by Lil League from Exile Tribe.

== Reception ==
The series, alongside Kyōshitsu no Katasumi de Seishun wa Hajimaru, won Taniguchi the New Creator Prize at the 26th Tezuka Osamu Cultural Prize. The series also won the Rakuten Kobo Special Award at Rakuten Kobo's 1st E-book Manga Awards in 2023.
