= Katsuya Takasu =

Japanese plastic surgeon (born 1945)

- 高須 克弥
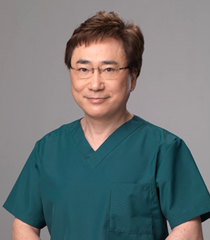
- Born: January 22, 1945 (age 81); Nishio, Aichi
- Occupation: Plastic surgeon
- Spouse: Takasu Shizu (1969-2010)
- Partner: Rieko Saibara (2012-present)

Katsuya Takasu (高須 克弥, Takasu Katsuya; January 22, 1945 in Isshiki, Aichi, Japan) is a plastic surgeon based in Tokyo. He has attracted controversies regarding his stances of Holocaust denial and Nanjing Massacre denial.

Takasu is a member of Japan Medical Association, Japan Society of Aesthetic Surgery, Japanese Association of Cosmetic Surgeons, Japan Society of Plastic and Reconstructive Surgery, and is a former member of the American Academy of Cosmetic Surgery. In January 2011, Takasu was also appointed to be a visiting professor of cosmetic surgery at Showa University School of Medicine.

== Life ==
Takasu studied at Showa University School of Medicine in Tokyo. As a graduate student, Takasu went to Germany and Italy, where he studied plastic and cosmetic surgery. In 1974, he established the Takasu General Hospital in his hometown, and in 1976, Takasu Clinic in Nagoya. As of 2010, Takasu Clinic has its branches in Tokyo, Yokohama, and Osaka.

In 1987, Takasu performed liposuction in Japan for the first time, having learned the technique from Pierre Fournier in Paris, France. Takasu has been President of Japan Society of Liposuction Surgery since 1987.

== Rejuvenation project ==
In 1999, at the age of 54, Takasu started to feel it strange that cosmetic surgeons looked older than their patients. He also thought it odd that surgeons actually did not know how painful each procedure was. Takasu made a resolution to experience a series of cosmetic surgeries himself and rejuvenate by 20 years. Within a year, Takasu underwent facelift, buccal fat removal, phenol peel, upper and lower blepharoplasty, hair transplantation, liposuction, and golden thread implant.

As of 2010, at the age of 65, his rejuvenation project is still in progress. Takasu later referred to the resolution as life changing, because it brought him back to the starting point of a medical doctor, "share the pains with patients."

== Philanthropy ==
Takasu is a philanthropist. Immediately after the 1995 Great Hanshin earthquake, which killed 6,434 people and injured 43,792, Takasu established the Organization of Cosmetic Surgery Volunteers, in cooperation with surgeons from 9 other clinics. The organization offered plastic and reconstructive treatment to the earthquake victims for free.

== Guinness World Record ==
In August 2011, Dr. Takasu together with his friend Koji Ishida (aged 71) established a Guinness World Record, of most golf holes played by a pair in 12 hours (cart). The pair completed 261 holes at Kyowa Country Club, Toyota City, Aichi Prefecture, Japan.

== Controversies ==
In 2017, the Simon Wiesenthal Center was made aware of Tweets made by the doctor in 2015, wherein he praised Nazism for the progress made in German technology under the Nazi regime. He conceded that there was no doubt the Jews were persecuted by the National Socialist German Workers' Party, but claimed that the toll of Auschwitz and the Holocaust victims had been exaggerated by Allies. The Simon Wiesenthal Center announced that the American Academy of Cosmetic Surgery had responded to the center, that an investigation about his membership would be completed in a few weeks.

On November 8, 2017, the Simon Wiesenthal Center announced that the American Academy of Cosmetic Surgery had expelled him due to Holocaust and Nanjing Massacre denial.

Takasu has posted articles denying sexual slavery by the Japanese imperial military during World War II and defending Unit 731.

After the controversial Yasukuni war memorial in Tokyo was vandalised by a protestor, Takasu called for the suspect to be abducted and delivered to the Japanese embassy, and offered a reward of 10 million yen.

== Forgery controversy ==
In December 2019, Takasu made statements on social media decrying an exhibit at the Aichi Triennale which featured the Statue of Peace, a South Korean sculpture commemorating comfort women. Takasu described the exhibit as anti-Japanese propaganda, criticized the curator Daisuke Tsuda who had arranged for the statue to be exhibited in Japan for the first time, and called for the resignation of Aichi Prefecture governor Hideaki Ōmura, who had headed the Aichi Triennale's organizing committee.

In August 2020, Takasu began a petition against Ōmura for his role in the exhibit, aiming to gather the 860,000 signatures required to trigger a recall election. Nagoya mayor Takashi Kawamura was one prominent supporter. However, Takasu gave up in November 2020 after gathering only 435,000 signatures. Upon investigation, the Aichi Prefectural Election Management Commission announced in February 2021 that 83% of the signatures appeared to have been forged by a small number of people, and filed a criminal complaint with Aichi police. Ōmura called on Takasu to take personal responsibility. On May 19, police arrested former prefectural assemblyman Takahiro Tanaka and his son, and in June prosecutors indicted the two as well as another person who confessed to the forgery for fear that Tanaka would try to pin all the blame on him.

Tsuda also filed suit in the Tokyo District Court against Takasu, which ruled in December 2023 that Takasu's statements constituted defamation and ordered him to pay Tsuda ￥2.5 million in damages.
