= Rieko Saibara =

Japanese manga artist

Rieko Saibara 西原 理恵子
- Born: 1 November 1964 (age 62) Kōchi, Japan
- Areas: Manga artist, illustrator, writer
- Pseudonym: Riezō (りえぞお)
- Notable works: Mainichi Kaasan; Jōkyō Monogatari; Onnanoko Monogatari
- Partners: Katsuya Takasu; (2012–present)
- Spouse: Yutaka Kamoshida (m. 1996; div. 2003)
- Children: 2

Rieko Saibara (西原 理恵子, Saibara Rieko; born 1 November 1964) is a Japanese manga artist. She made her professional debut in 1988 with Chikuro Yochien, serialized in Weekly Young Sunday. In 1989, she graduated from the Department of Visual Communication Design at Musashino Art University. Saibara has received numerous awards throughout her career, including the 43rd Bungeishunjū Manga Award in 1997 for Bokunchi; the Excellence Award at the 8th Japan Media Arts Festival in 2004 for Mainichi Kaasan; the Short Story Award at the 9th Osamu Tezuka Cultural Prizes in 2005 for Mainichi Kaasan and Jōkyō Monogatari; the President of the House of Councilors Award at the 40th Japan Cartoonist Awards in 2011 for Mainichi Kaasan; and the 6th Best Mother Award for Literature in 2020.

She is friends with fellow manga artist Nobuyuki Fukumoto. When she appeared on "Big Comic Superior Presents: The 6th Saibara Rieko's Life Art Skill Showdown", she revealed that she had known him for 20 years, and wrote that he has been "a handsome, serious, gentle-mannered and lovely man ever since then", but he was ignored by female manga artists because of his unpopular status.

== Works ==
=== Manga ===
- Chikuro Yochien (serialized in Weekly Young Sunday, 1988–1994)
- Yunbo-kun (serialized in Manga Club, 1989–1997)
- Ura Mishuran (co-author, serialized in Weekly Asahi, 1992–1994)
- Bokunchi (serialized in Big Comic Spirits, 1995–1998)
- Mainichi Kaasan (serialized in the Mainichi Shimbun, 2002–2017)
- Ikechan to Boku (serialized in Yasei Jidai, 2004–2006)
- Pāmanento no Bara (serialized in Shinchosha 45, 2004–2006)
- Jōkyō Monogatari (serialized in Big Comic Superior, 2004)
- Onnanoko Monogatari (serialized in Big Comic Superior, 2005)
- Eigyō Monogatari (serialized in Big Comic Superior, 2005)
- Dārin wa 70-sai (Note: Dārin wa 70-sai ("My Darling Is 70-Years-Old") is based on Saibara's relationship with the plastic surgeon Katsuya Takasu. Each year, she updates the series' title to reflect Takasu's age. For example, in 2019, the manga was serialized as Dārin wa 74-sai ("My Darling Is 74-Years-Old").) (serialized in Big Comic Superior, 2014–present)
- Rie-san Techō (serialized in the Mainichi Shimbun, 2017–present)

=== Video games ===
- Saibara Rieko no Mahjong Hourouki (Super Famicom, 1995)
- Janhai Yūgi '99: Tanuki no Kawazan'yō (PlayStation, 1998)
- Saibara Rieko no Mahjong Toriatama Kikō (PlayStation, 2000)
- Saibara Rieko no Dendō Mahjong (Game Boy Advance, 2001)
