= Naniwa Kin'yūdō =

Manga

- Cover of the first volume

ナニワ金融道
- Manga
- Written by: Yūji Aoki
- Published by: Kodansha
- Magazine: Weekly Morning
- Original run: 1990 – 1996
- Volumes: 19
- Manga

Shin Naniwa Kin'yūdō
- Published by: Aoba Shuppan
- Magazine: Comic Junk
- Original run: 2007 – present
- Volumes: 20
- Manga

Za Naniwa Kin'yūdō
- Published by: Shueisha
- Magazine: Grand Jump Premium
- Original run: 2016 – present
- Volumes: 3
- icon

Naniwa Kin'yudo (Japanese: ナニワ金融道; lit. 'The Way of Osaka Financing') is a Japanese manga series by Yūji Aoki which has been serialized in Weekly Morning since 1990. The series was awarded the 1992 Kodansha Manga Award for general manga and the 1998 Tezuka Osamu Cultural Prize Award for Excellence.

== Plot ==
The protagonist is Tatsuyuki Haibara, a young salaryman, Tokyo-born but living in Osaka. He loses his job at the start of the series and seeks work in the financial sector, but is repeatedly unsuccessful despite his intelligence and aptitude. (Haibara had been pressured into keeping his previous employer afloat with large personal loans, behavior highlighted in his credit rating and regarded as suspicious even though he repaid them.) Exhausting his options, he applies for a position at a small, shady loans company with links to the yakuza. Haibara is hired, but soon realises that his colleagues are little better than loan sharks, quick to intimidate clients who default.

The series follows Haibara's dealings with many and varied customers as he strives to avoid his co-workers' more violent methods.

Other than Haibara, most of the characters are Osakans who speak in heavy Kansai dialect.
