= My House (film) =

- Film poster
- Directed by: Junji Sakamoto
- Written by: Isamu Uno
- Based on: Bokunchi by Rieko Saibara
- Starring: Arisa Mizuki; Ran Otori; Yuma Yamoto; Yuki Tanaka; Claude Maki
- Cinematography: Norimichi Kasamatsu
- Edited by: Takeo Araki
- Music by: Hajimenikiyoshi
- Production companies: Toei Studios Kyoto; Eisei Gekijo; TV Tokyo; Tokyo FM; Shogakukan
- Distributed by: Asmik Ace Entertainment
- Release date: April 12, 2003 (Japan)
- Running time: 115 minutes
- Country: Japan
- Language: Japanese

My House (Japanese: ぼくんち, Hepburn: Bokunchi) is a 2003 Japanese drama film directed by Junji Sakamoto, starring Arisa Mizuki. It is based on the comic of the same name by Rieko Saibara.

The film won the special jury prize at the Las Palmas de Gran Canaria International Film Festival in 2003.

== Cast ==
- Arisa Mizuki
- Ran Otori
- Yuma Yamoto
- Yuki Tanaka
- Claude Maki
- Ittoku Kishibe
- Eiko Shinya
- Eiji Minakata
- Matsunosuke Shofukutei
- Masaru Shiga
- Koji Imada
- Masaru Hamaguchi
