= Yūji Aoki =

Japanese manga artist

- Born: June 9, 1945; Fukuchiyama, Kyoto, Japan
- Died: September 5, 2003 (aged 58)
- Occupation: Manga artist
- Awards: 1992 Kodansha Manga Award (Naniwa Kin'yūdō); 1998 Tezuka Osamu Cultural Prize

Yūji Aoki (Japanese: 青木 雄二, Hepburn: Aoki Yūji; June 9, 1945 – September 5, 2003) was a Japanese manga artist and essayist born in Fukuchiyama, Kyoto, Japan.

He is best known for his 1990 debut manga Naniwa Kin'yūdō (ナニワ金融道; literally The Way of Osaka Financing, colloquially translated as The Way of the Osaka Loan Shark), for which he won the 1992 Kodansha Manga Award for general manga and the 1998 Tezuka Osamu Cultural Prize Award for Excellence.

Takahiro Kochi was his assistant.

== History ==
In 1964, he graduated from the civil engineering department of Okayama Prefectural Tsuyama Technical High School. While at school, he was a member of the baseball team and played as a catcher. After graduation, he joined Sanyo Electric Railroad in Kobe, Hyogo Prefecture.

In 1969, he resigned from Sanyo Electric Railway after five years of employment, as he was dissatisfied with the company's policy of placing importance on academic qualifications.

He returned to his hometown of Okayama Prefecture and became a staff member at Kumenan Town Hall, but eventually got tired of living in the countryside and quit after three months. He moved to Osaka and started working part-time at a beer hall. After that, he worked in over 30 different jobs, mainly in the entertainment industry, as a pachinko parlor clerk and a cabaret boy. He says that these experiences were very helpful in drawing manga. According to him, the easiest job was being a civil servant, the most physically demanding was working at a pachinko parlor, and the most mentally demanding was being a manga artist. He says that at the time, pachinko parlors had loud background music, many customers smoked, and the atmosphere inside the parlors was very bad, so it was difficult for him to be a pachinko parlor clerk.

In 1995, at the age of 50, he married a woman 19 years his junior. He said he met his wife at a coffee shop he frequented, but after his death, his wife revealed in her book, My Husband, Aoki Yuji – The Truth About the Naniwa Heretic Manga Artist. They met as customers and hostesses in Kitashinchi. They had a son when he was at the age of 55. Aoki himself had been through over 50 arranged marriages.

Sales of Naniwa Kin'yū-dō, which began serialization in 1990, topped 10 million copies in March 1997, and Aoki declared, "I've earned enough money to live on for the rest of my life, and I'm going to spend the rest of my life playing." He had planned to retire from manga writing and spend the rest of his life freely, but he was busy with many requests to write for books and give lectures, even after retirement. This was closely covered in a TBS / JNN news special titled Naniwa Kin'yū-dō: The Real Face of Aoki Yuji, which became one of the few video recordings of Aoki.

He died of lung cancer on September 5, 2003, at the age of 58.

== Awards ==
- 1970 – Big Comic Newcomer Award Honorable Mention
- 1989 – Afternoon Shiki Shō Honorable Mention
- 1992 – 16th Kodansha Manga Award
- 1998 – Winner of the 2nd Tezuka Osamu Cultural Award Excellence Award

== Adaptations ==
His novel Tōgenkyō no hito-bito was adapted into the 2002 Japanese comedy film Shangri-La directed by Takashi Miike.
