= Neighborhood Craftsmen: Stories from Kanda's Gokura-chou =

Japanese manga series

- Cover of the first volume

神田ごくら町職人ばなし (Kanda Gokura-chō Shokunin-Banash)
- Genre: Historical
- Manga
- Written by: Akihito Sakaue
- Published by: Leed Publishing
- English publisher: NA: Yen Press
- Magazine: Comic Ran (2020–2022); Torch Web (2022–present)
- Original run: October 27, 2020 – present
- Volumes: 1

Neighborhood Craftsmen: Stories from Kanda's Gokura-chou (Japanese: 神田ごくら町職人ばなし, Hepburn: Kanda Gokura-chō Shokunin-Banashi) is a Japanese historical manga series written and illustrated by Akihito Sakaue. Set in the fictional Kanda Gokura-chō during the Edo period, the series portrays the lives and crafts of traditional artisans, including wooden tub makers, swordsmiths, dyers, tatami makers and plasterers. The stories combine depictions of craft techniques with the personal circumstances of the craftsmen, often presenting each chapter as a self-contained vignette focused on a single trade.

It was irregularly serialized in Leed Publishing's Comic Ran magazine from October 2020 to February 2022, before beginning a weekly serialization on the website Torch Web in October 2022. .The first tankōbon volume was published on August 31, 2023, and collects episodic chapters each centered on a different traditional occupation – for example, 「桶職人」 (okekuri / "Tub Maker"), 「刀鍛冶」 (katanakaji / "Swordsmith"), 「紺屋」 (kōya / "Dyer"), 「畳刺し」 (tatamishi / "Tatami Maker") and 「左官」 (sakan / "Plasterer").

The manga has received multiple awards and recognitions, including the 28th Tezuka Osamu Cultural Prizeand placement in Takara jimasha's annual "Kono Manga ga Sugoi! 2024" guidebook (men's category).

== Publication ==
Written and illustrated by Akihito Sakaue, the series began serialization in Leed Publishing's Comic Ran magazine on October 27, 2020. It was irregularly serialized in Comic Ran until February 28, 2022. On October 19, 2022, the series began weekly serialization on Torch Web. As of August 2023, one tankōbon volume has been released.

On February 7, 2025, Yen Press announced that they had licensed the series for English publication beginning in July 2025.

=== Volumes ===
No.	Original release date	Original ISBN	English release date	English ISBN
1	August 31, 2023	978-4-8458-6163-7	July 22, 2025	979-8-8554-1331-1

== Reception ==
Seihei Nakajo of The Asahi Shimbun praised the illustrations and story, particularly the setting. Kyo Furubayashi of Da Vinci felt the manga was well-researched. He also praised the setting, illustrations, and characters.

In the 2024 edition of the Kono Manga ga Sugoi! guidebook's list of the top manga for male readers, the series ranked third. In 2024, the series ranked third in the 17th Manga Taishō. In the same year, the series won the New Creator Prize at the 28th Tezuka Osamu Cultural Prize. The series was included in the American Library Association's 2025 Best Graphic Novels for Adults list.
