= Shangri-La (film) =

2002 Japanese comedy film

- Film poster
- Directed by: Takashi Miike
- Screenplay by: Masakuni Takahashi
- Based on: Tōgenkyō no hito-bito by Yūji Aoki
- Produced by: Shusaku Matsuoka; Kazushi Miki; Motomu Tomita
- Cinematography: Hideo Yamamoto
- Edited by: Yasushi Shimamura
- Music by: Kōji Endō
- Release date: 2002
- Running time: 105 minutes
- Country: Japan
- Language: Japanese

Shangri-La (Japanese: 金融破滅ニッポン 桃源郷の人々, Hepburn: Kin'yū hametsu Nippon: Tōgenkyō no hito-bito) is a 2002 Japanese comedy film directed by Takashi Miike. It is based on the autobiographical novel Tōgenkyō no hito-bito by Yūji Aoki.

== Plot ==
The wealthy businessman Korijima of Uwazoko-ya declares bankruptcy, leaving a 10-million-yen contract unpaid to Shosuke Umemoto's printing shop and thereby leaving Shosuke's brother Chusuke unable to repay a 9-million-yen loan to the loan shark Shoko. Shosuke plans to kill himself in his car through carbon monoxide poisoning but stops to assist a man from a nearby homeless village who has been injured by members of the Seiryu mob for threatening to tell the police about their illegal dumping of trash in the village. In return, the members of the village make use of their various ingenious resources as they embark on a complex scheme to blackmail Korijima.

The liquidator arrives and takes everything in Shosuke's printing shop apart from Shosuke's father's prized Heidel printer. The liquidator leaves Shosuke 1.3 million yen and schedules the pickup of the office supplies on the evening of the 27th. The homeless village's Mayor borrows 600,000 yen from Shosuke. The village's Deputy Kuwata, a former postal worker, gives it to Mr. Okajima to buy 100 shares in Dango Construction, a company with close ties to the Department of Public Works. When Shoko demands the repayment of Chusuke's loan, the Mayor secretly reveals himself to Shoko as Kiyota the Hitman and convinces Shoko to forgive the debt and give him ten blank checks, which Shosuke uses to forge bank drafts using Dango's seal. They leave the drafts in a wallet at an ATM. When the wallet is discovered by a man, they suggest to the man that he should have the newspaper write a story about it in order to ensure that he gets a reward for finding the bank drafts, thereby ensuring uncertainty among investors and lowering the share price.

Kiyota's former lover Mari, who is still struggling to make ends meet in the city, has become pregnant by her new lover yet still lends Kiyota money to accomplish his scheme. Seisuke and his wife leave his children and his elderly mother with his brother and run away to the homeless village before the liquidator comes.

They use the Heidel printer to create four-color flyers advertising a fresh fish festival on the front but with pictures on the back of Korijima's 8.3-billion-yen private assets discovered by Ume, a former private detective now living in the village. They extort 20 million yen from Korijima in exchange for the flyers, plates, photos, and negatives. Dango's share price has dropped significantly in the meantime, allowing the men to buy stock cheaply. News reports that the CEO of Dango has a mistress who is 40 years younger than he is gives investors renewed confidence in his health, causing a rush on shares and driving up the share price. When the share price doubles, they sell all their shares and make a fortune, but the residents of the homeless village decide to give all of the money to Shosuke and his wife to enable them to pay their employees' salaries and return to their life in the city.

== Cast ==
- Show Aikawa as The Mayor
- Shirō Sano as The Deputy
- Yu Tokui as Umemoto
- Midoriko Kimura as Fusae
- Hoka Kinoshita as Ume
- Kogan Ashiya as Uehara
- Akaji Maro as Korijima
- Shigeru Muroi as Mari
- Takashi Ebata as Matsui
- Yojin Hino as Takeda
- Toshiki Ayata as Etō

== Other credits ==
- Produced by
  - Yoichi Arishige - producer
  - Kazuhisa Kawaguchi - planner
  - Shusaku Matsuoka - producer
  - Kazushi Miki - producer
  - Tsuneo Ochi - executive producer
  - Ken Takeuchi - planner
  - Motomu Tomita - producer
  - Tsutomu Tsuchikawa - executive producer: Daiei
- Production Design: Akira Ishige
- Production Manager: Katsuhiro Ogawa
- Assistant Director: Bunmei Katō
- Sound Department
  - Yoshiya Obara - sound
  - Kenji Shibazaki - sound effects
- Lighting technician: Akira Ono
