= WXIII: Patlabor the Movie 3 =

2002 Japanese anime film

- Theatrical poster

Japanese name
- Kana: WXIII 機動警察パトレイバー
Transcriptions
- Revised Hepburn: Weisuteddo Sātīn Kidō Keisatsu Patoreibā
- Directed by: Fumihiko Takayama
- Screenplay by: Miki Tori
- Based on: Patlabor by Headgear
- Produced by: Masahiro Fukushima; Tsutomu Sugita
- Starring: Katsuhiko Watabiki; Hiroaki Hirata; Atsuko Tanaka
- Cinematography: Hisao Shirai
- Edited by: Kyoko Mizuta; Takeshi Seyama; Mutsumi Takemiya; Megumi Uchida
- Music by: Kenji Kawai
- Production companies: Madhouse; Triangle Staff
- Distributed by: Shochiku
- Release date: March 30, 2002
- Running time: 94 minutes
- Country: Japan
- Language: Japanese

WXIII: Patlabor the Movie 3 (WXIII 機動警察パトレイバー, Weisuteddo Sātīn Kidō Keisatsu Patoreibā) is a 2002 Japanese animated science fiction thriller film directed by Fumihiko Takayama and written by Miki Tori. The third and final installment of the Patlabor film trilogy, it takes place in between Patlabor: The Movie and Patlabor 2: The Movie and serves as a side story, focusing on two police detectives and SV2 as they investigate a series of mysterious acts of deadly destruction occurring in and around Tokyo Bay that may be connected to a genetic experiment gone wrong. It was animated by Madhouse and produced by Bandai Visual and Tohokushinsha.

== Plot ==
In 2000, a series of unknown attacks on Labors have led to two police detectives, Shinichiro Hata and Takeshi Kusumi, being assigned to investigate these string of events, assisted by members of the Tokyo Metropolitan Police Department's SV2 unit.

As they begin to unravel the mystery behind the attacks, the two detectives find reason to suspect that the attacks may have something to do with the American military stationed in Japan, elements of the Japanese Ground Self-Defense Forces, and a female scientist involved in a biological weapons program known as Wasted XIII.

== Cast ==
Character	Japanese	English (Geneon Entertainment, 2003)
Detective Takeshi Kusumi	Katsuhiko Watabiki	Alfred Thor
Detective Shinichiro Hata	Hiroaki Hirata	Dave Wittenberg
Saeko Misaki	Atsuko Tanaka	Kari Wahlgren
Toshiro Kurusu	Takanobu Hozumi	Simon Prescott
Shizuo Miyanomori	Shingo Hiromori	Steven Chester Prince
Goro Ishihara	Junpei Morita	Kirk Thornton
Hitomi Misaki	Risa Suzuki	Julie Maddalena
Captain Kiichi Goto	Ryūsuke Ōbayashi	Daran Norris
Noa Izumi	Miina Tominaga	Michelle Ruff
Asuma Shinohara	Toshio Furukawa	Richard Cansino
Isao Ohta	Michihiro Ikemizu	Richard Epcar
Mikiyasu Shinshi	Issei Futamata	
Hiromi Yamazaki	Daisuke Gōri	
Captain Ōsumi	Masaru Ikeda	Dan Lorge

== Development ==
Triangle Staff was the original animation studio entrusted with the film, however the studio went defunct during its production. Madhouse then took over the project, though Triangle Staff's involvement would be acknowledged in the film's end credits.

Very similar in premise and plot to episode 3 of the original OVA The 450-Million-Year-Old Trap and the manga arcs in volumes 7 to 10 that greatly extended the plot of that episode.

== Release ==
WXIII premiered out of competition during the Tokyo International Fantastic Film Festival, which had special screening on December 10, 2001. WXIII's Japanese theatrical release took place on March 30, 2002, to coincide with the release of Minipato. Geneon Entertainment licensed WXIII for its North American theatrical release on January 10, 2003, and DVD release in May 2003, which was eventually followed by later DVD releases to Europe and Oceania. It was licensed in Australia by Madman Entertainment. Section23 Films has licensed all three Patlabor films for North America. Section23 Films released the movie on Blu-ray and DVD on September 8, 2015.

== Reception ==
WXIII garnered generally mixed reviews, and holds an average of 47/100 on aggregate web site Metacritic.

Animerica gave it a favorable review calling it an "ambitious work which holds its own with both Oshii's justly acclaimed Patlabor movies and with the best works of Japan's live-action horror cinema."

== See also ==
- The Host, a 2006 monster film with similar plot elements
