= Uoto =

Japanese manga artist (born 1997)

- Born: May 29, 1997 (age 29); Tokyo, Japan
- Notable work: 100 Meters; Orb: On the Movements of the Earth
- Awards: 2021: Mangado Kobayashi Award; 2022: Osamu Tezuka Cultural Prize; 2023: Seiun Award

Uoto (魚豊; born May 29, 1997) is a Japanese manga artist known for blending surreal horror, psychological drama, and social commentary. He is better known for writing and illustrating the manga 100 Meters and Orb: On the Movements of the Earth. It has been critically acclaimed and has won several prestigious awards. Uoto has gained recognition for his intricate storytelling, historical research, and detailed artwork.

== Early life and career ==
Uoto was born in Tokyo. His pseudonym Uotoyo (魚豊) derives from his fondness for Daggertooth pike conger (ハモ/鱧 hamo), his favorite fish. From childhood, he displayed a passion for drawing and harbored a vague aspiration to become a manga artist. This ambition crystallized during his first year of junior high school after watching the anime Bakuman, which revealed the professional path of manga creation. Inspired, he began submitting his original work for publication.

Uoto enrolled in university to study philosophy but left after two years to pursue manga full-time. During a May 5, 2021, interview on Yomiuri TV's Kawashima and Yamauchi's Manga Swamp, he stated: "I'm now 23, but I began submitting manga at age 13".

In 2017, his one-shot, Honorable Work, earned selection for the Weekly Shōnen Magazine Newcomer Manga Award and was published in Bessatsu Shōnen Magazine, marking his official debut. By early 2018, he further honed his skills as an assistant for The Kindaichi Case Files Gaiden: The Case Files of the Criminals.

From November 2018 to August 2019, he serialized 100 Meters—a story about a swift-footed boy—in Magazine Pocket. The series' success garnered attention from prominent editors across the industry. Even before its final volume's release, he connected via Twitter with Chiyoda, an editor at Weekly Big Comic Spirits, signaling his rising prominence. Despite being a third-year editor at the company and facing career disadvantages, Chiyoda proactively networked with Uoyu, joining Yoneshiro Kyo and his editor Kinjo for drinks. This personal outreach proved pivotal—Uoyu ultimately chose to serialize his work in Chiyoda's magazine.

In 2020, Uoto launched his critically acclaimed series Orb: On the Movements of the Earth in Big Comic Spirits, marking his debut in the prestigious magazine.

In July 2021, when Big Comic Spirits revamped its Newcomer Award into the "Spirits Newcomer King Championship", Uoto was honored as its inaugural judge. In 2022, Orb On the Movements of the Earth earned the 26th Tezuka Osamu Cultural Prize's Manga Grand Prize. In 2023, the same work secured the 54th Seiun Award in the Comics category. Later, in August, Uoto began serializing Welcome to FACT (Tokyo S Ward Second Branch) simultaneously in Manga One and Ura Sunday. In August 2024, he received the Forbes Japan 30 Under 30 award in Entertainment & Sports.

== Influences ==
- Musical: Uoto initiated a creative correspondence project with lead singer Hiromu Akita of the rock band Amazarashi, exchanging original artworks and dialogues.
- Philosophical: Uoto cites philosopher Friedrich Nietzsche and comedian Chidori's Daigo as key influences.
- Artistic: Uoto credits Parasyte, Ping Pong, Ushijima the Loan Shark, Kaiji, Ajin, and Death Note as pivotal works shaping his style.
