= Mari Yamazaki =

Japanese manga artist

Mari Yamazaki ヤマザキ マリ
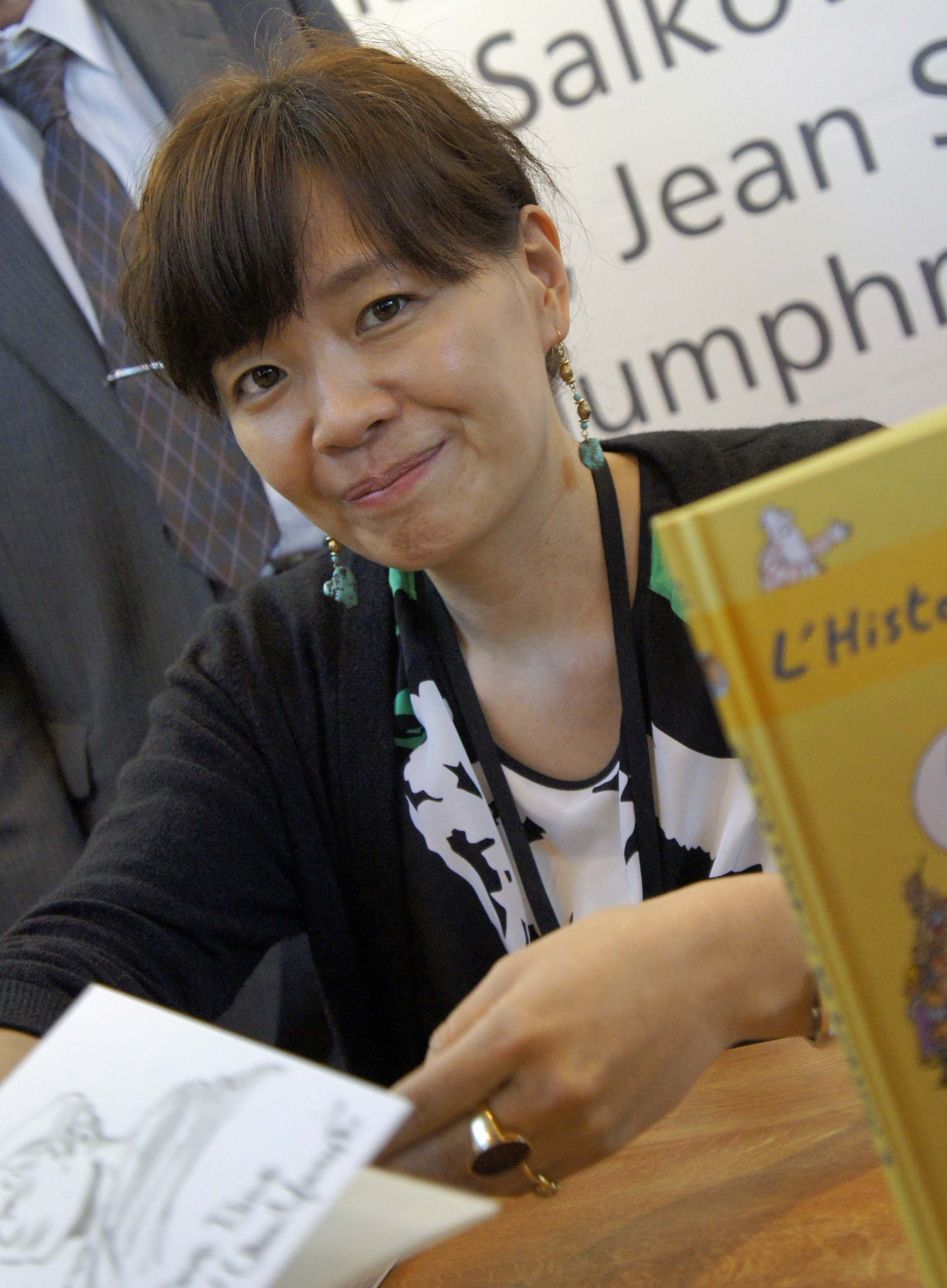
- Mari Yamazaki at the Paris Book Fair 2012
- Born: April 20, 1967 (age 59) Tokyo, Japan
- Area: Manga artist
- Notable works: Thermae Romae

Mari Yamazaki (ヤマザキ マリ, Yamazaki Mari; born 20 April 1967) is a Japanese manga artist known for her seinen comedy manga Thermae Romae. She was born in Tokyo, but spent many years in Italy and now lives in Chicago. Between 2003 and 2013 she lived in Syria, Portugal and the United States.

First, she went to Italy to study art when she was 17. She was planning to study in UK, but a ceramics artist called Marco Tasco convinced her and her family to go to Italy instead. She attend the National Academy of Fine Arts in Florence, where she studied art history and oil painting.

As soon as her son, Derusu was born in Italy, she decided to become a single mother and returned to Sapporo, Japan with her son where her mother lived. That was about when she started drawing manga seriously in order to support herself and her son. She debuted as a manga artist in 1997. She couldn’t make a living just from manga at her earlier career, and so taught Italian at a university, worked on TV as a reporter specializing in hot spring resorts. This eventually inspired her later big hit, Thermae Romae.

She was awarded the 3rd Manga Taishō and the Short Story Award in the 2010 Tezuka Osamu Cultural Prizes. An anime adaptation of the manga has been produced and aired and a live-action film adaptation was released in April 2012, with its sequel, Thermae Romae II, in April 2014.

On 1 April 2026, Mari Yamazaki debuted as a VTuber named Minerva Cacumen Montis from ancient Rome, at the urging of the Hololive-affiliated VTuber Juufuutei Raden.

== Selected works ==
- Yūmeijin (有名人) (2001, ISBN 978-4063344851)
- Kokoro ni Sasayaite (心にささやいて) (2003, ISBN 978-4872877953)
- 2050-nen no Watashi Kara (2050年の私から) (2005, ISBN 978-4062129169)
- Mōretsu! Italia Kazoku (モーレツ!イタリア家族) (2006, ISBN 978-4063376074)
- Sore de wa Sassoku Buon Appetito! (それではさっそくBuonappetito!) (2007, ISBN 978-4063376487)
- Rumi to Maya to Sono Shūhen (ルミとマヤとその周辺) (2008, ISBN 978-4063406863, ISBN 978-4063376487, ISBN 978-4063407570)
- Thermae Romae (テルマエ・ロマエ, Terumae Romae) (2008, ISBN 978-4-04-726127-3, ISBN 978-4047267701, ISBN 978-4047272323, ISBN 978-4047275157)
- Italia Kazoku Fūrinkazan (イタリア家族風林火山) (2008, ISBN 978-4-82-117023-4)
- Ryōko-san no Iu Koto ni wa Shinonomechō Rumi Maya Nikki (涼子さんの言うことには 東雲町ルミマヤ日記) (2009)
- Sekai no Hate de mo Mangakaki (世界の果てでも漫画描き) (2009, ISBN 978-4420220552, ISBN 978-4420220569)
- Chikyū Ren'ai (地球恋愛) (2010, ISBN 978-4063761030)
- PIL (2010, ISBN 978-4420152372)
- Arabia Neko no Gorumu (アラビア猫のゴルム) (2010, ISBN 978-4063377187)
- Bōen Nippon Kenbun Roku (望遠ニッポン見聞録) (2010)
- Sweet Home Chicago (2012, ISBN 978-4063377552; 2013, ISBN 978-4063377767; 2014, ISBN 978-4063377927)
- Giacomo Foscari (ジャコモ・フォスカリ) (2011)
- Tatte Iru Mono wa Haha (Ryōko) de mo Tsukae (立っている者は母（リョウコ）でも使え) (2012)
- Jobs (2013)
- PLINIVS (プリニウス) (2013) (in collaboration with Miki Tori)
- Olympia Kyklos (オリンピア・キュクロス) (2018)
- Thermae Romae Redux (続テルマエ・ロマエ, Zoku Thermae Romae) (2024)

== Honours ==
- Commander of the Order of the Star of Italy, for her contribution to the growth of Italian culture (2017)
