= PLINIVS =

Japanese manga series

- First tankōbon volume cover, depicting the eruption of Mount Vesuvius

プリニウス (Puriniusu)
- Manga
- Written by: Mari Yamazaki; Miki Tori
- Published by: Shinchosha
- Imprint: Bunch Comics
- Magazine: Shinchō 45; Shinchō
- Original run: December 18, 2013 – February 7, 2023
- Volumes: 12

PLINIVS (プリニウス, Puriniusu) is a Japanese manga series written and illustrated by Mari Yamazaki and Miki Tori. The series is a biography of Pliny the Elder. It was initially serialized in Shinchosha's Shinchō 45 magazine from December 2013 to September 2018. After the final issue of Shinchō 45 was published, it was later transferred to the Shinchō magazine, where it continued from December 2018 to February 2023.

The series won the 28th Tezuka Osamu Cultural Prize in 2024.

== Synopsis ==
In the year 60 in Sicily, during an eruption of Mount Etna, Pliny met Eucles, who would become his scribe and follow him everywhere to record every word he uttered for 20 years until Pliny's death during the eruption of Mount Vesuvius in 79 AD.

== Publication ==
Written and illustrated by Mari Yamazaki and Miki Tori, PLINIVS was initially serialized in Shinchosha's Shinchō 45 magazine from December 18, 2013, to September 18, 2018. After the publication of the final issue of Shinchō 45, the series was transferred to the Shinchō magazine, where it continued from December 7, 2018, to February 7, 2023. The series' chapters were collected into twelve tankōbon volumes from July 9, 2014, to July 7, 2023.

No.	Release date	ISBN
1	July 9, 2014	978-4-10-771757-3
2	February 9, 2015	978-4-10-771799-3
3	September 9, 2015	978-4-10-771841-9
4	June 9, 2016	978-4-10-771899-0
5	February 9, 2017	978-4-10-771954-6
6	October 7, 2017	978-4-10-772016-0
7	July 9, 2018	978-4-10-772100-6
8	April 9, 2019	978-4-10-772176-1
9	November 9, 2019	978-4-10-772233-1
10	September 9, 2020	978-4-10-772319-2
11	July 8, 2021	978-4-10-772407-6
12	July 7, 2023	978-4-10-772620-9

== Reception ==
The series, alongside Dead Dead Demon's Dededede Destruction, was ranked 18th in the 2016 edition of Takarajimasha's Kono Manga ga Sugoi! guidebook for the best manga for male readers. The series was also nominated for Best Comic at the 46th Angoulême International Comics Festival in 2019. The series won the 28th Tezuka Osamu Cultural Prize in 2024.
