= Sayuri Iwai =

Sayuri Iwai 岩井小百合
- Born: August 10, 1968 (age 58); Kanagawa Prefecture, Japan
- Genres: Kayōkyoku
- Years active: 1983 - 1987
- Label: King Records

Sayuri Iwai (Japanese: 岩井小百合, Hepburn: Iwai Sayuri; born 10 August 1968) is a retired Japanese actress and idol who had success in the 1980s. In 1983, she became the youngest female solo artist to have performed at the Nippon Budokan, aged fifteen years old, a record she still holds as of 2026.

== Early life and education ==
Sayuri Iwai was born on August 10, 1968, in Sagamihara City, Kanagawa Prefecture, Japan. In elementary school, she participated in the TV Tokyo program Chibikko Uta Mane Best Ten, a children's singing competition, where she won the grand prize. She later attended Hadano Municipal Daikon Junior High School, and Horikoshi High School, which she attended alongside Kumiko Takeda, Yōko Oginome, and Hiroko Moriguchi, all of whom would also go on to be actresses and idols.

== Career ==
Iwai made her film debut in an adaptation of Toshiko Takagi's Garasu no Usagi (ガラスのうさぎ) (lit. "The Glass Rabbit") in 1979 at the age of ten.

In 1983, Iwai was promoted as a "little sister" mascot for Japanese rockabilly band Yokohama Ginbae. She made her debut as an idol on January 12, 1983 with the single "Dream Dream Dream" (ドリームドリームドリーム), which peaked at number 19 on the Oricon Weekly Singles Chart. "Dream Dream Dream" was written and composed by Yokohama Ginbae member Taku. Iwai released four further singles in 1983, all of which charted within the top 20 on the Oricon Weekly Singles Chart. On July 1, 1983, Iwai won the Diamond Award for Best Newcomer at the Megalopolis Music Festival with "Dream Dream Dream".

Iwai's first album, Ginbae Ikka Chūgaku 3-Nen 7-Kumi Iwai Sayuri (銀蝿一家中学3年7組いわいさゆり 発売日, lit. "Ginbae Ikka Junior High School 3rd Year Class 7 Sayuri Iwai") was released on July 20, 1983.

On September 24, 1983, Iwai performed a concert at the Nippon Budokan, aged fifteen years old, making her the youngest female solo artist to ever perform at the historic venue. In 2012 and 2014 respectively, girl bands Tokyo Girls' Style and Babymetal would set new records for the youngest female group members to perform at the Budokan, but Iwai remains the youngest female solo act to do so. Iwai Sayuri in Budokan (岩井小百合イン武道館), a live album of recordings from Iwai's concert, was released on December 21, 1983.

At the 14th Japan Music Awards on November 11, 1983, Iwai won the Music Newcomer Award with her fourth single, "Koi Anata Shidai!" (恋・あなた・し・だ・い!) (lit. "Love is Up To You!"). At the 25th Japan Record Awards on December 31, 1983, Iwai was nominated for the Newcomer Award. Iwai also received a Golden Arrow Award in the Best Music Newcomer category in 1983.

On 27 April 1984, Iwai made her television acting debut in a starring role in Fuji TV drama series Kurukuru Kurin, an adaptation of Miki Tori's manga series of the same name. Iwai also recorded the theme song for Kurukuru Kurin, "Parallel Girl" (パラレルガール), which was released as a single and peaked at number 36 on the Oricon Weekly Singles Chart. On July 25, 1984, Iwai released her second studio album, Fairy, Sayuri. She released her third studio album, Romantic★Street (ロマンティック★ストリート) on November 5 the same year.

On April 22, 1985, Iwai starred in a two-hour television film broadcast on TV Asahi, Ima, Ijime ga Bakuhatsu Suru! (今、いじめが爆発する！, lit. "Bullying is About to Explode!"). In the film, Iwai portrays a schoolgirl who is the victim of extreme bullying by her classmates. Iwai's performance was well-received, as her idol image contrasted against the dark subject matter of the film.

On March 5, 1986, Iwai released her fourth and final studio album, Naturally (ナチュラリー). The album contains original lyrics and compositions by Iwai, as well as lyrics written in collaboration with prolific songwriter Minako Yoshida.

In 1987, Iwai would star in a stage production of Princess Sara. During rehearsals for the play, Iwai and a young man went on their first date to Tokyo Disneyland on June 2, 1987. While riding Space Mountain, Iwai's date complained that he felt unwell and began to groan in pain. When the rollercoaster came to a final stop, it was discovered that the man had died of an intracerebral hemorrhage caused by a ruptured blood vessel during the ride. Iwai, despite being in shock, continued with her rehearsals and performed in the play's tour as scheduled.

Following this incident, Iwai began to slowly retreat from the music industry, but worked in various different roles, including finding work as writer in the pachinko industry and as a radio personality and morning talk show journalist.

== Personal life ==
Iwai married her husband, a surgeon, in 2003, and gave birth to a daughter in 2004. Iwai and her family moved to Houston, Texas in the United States in 2005, while her husband studied cancer research. Iwai studied English as a second language (ESL) at Rice University while in the US. She gave birth to a son in 2007. Iwai and her family returned to Japan in 2008.

== Discography ==
Sayuri Iwai discography
- Studio albums: 4
- Live albums: 1
- Compilation albums: 2
- Singles: 11
- Mini albums: 3

=== Albums ===
==== Studio albums ====
Title	Details
Ginbae Ikka Chūgaku 3-Nen 7-Kumi Iwai Sayuri (銀蝿一家中学3年7組いわいさゆり)	Released: July 20, 1983; Label: King Records
Fairy, Sayuri	Released: July 25, 1984; Label: King Records
Romantic★Street (ロマンティック★ストリート)	Released: November 5, 1984; Label: King Records
Naturally (ナチュラリー)	Released: March 5, 1986; Label: King Records

==== Live albums ====
Title	Details
Iwai Sayuri in Budokan (岩井小百合イン武道館)	Released: December 21, 1983; Label: King Records

==== Mini Albums ====
Title	Details
I ❤ Exciting Mini	Released: December 5, 1983; Label: King Records
I ❤ Exciting Mini (1984)	Released: December 5, 1984; Label: King Records
Dear Heart (ディアハート)	Released: December 5, 1985; Label: King Records

==== Compilation Albums ====
Title	Details
Dream Box (ドリームBox)	Released: December 21, 2005; Label: King Records
Perfect Best (パーフェクト・ベスト)	Released: July 7, 2010; Label: King Records

=== Singles ===
Year	Title	Peak chart positions	Album
Year	Title	Japan (Oricon)	Album
1983	"Dream Dream Dream"	19	Ginbae Ikka Chūgaku 3-Nen 7-Kumi Iwai Sayuri
1983	"Dokidoki Heart no Birthday Party"	20	Ginbae Ikka Chūgaku 3-Nen 7-Kumi Iwai Sayuri
1983	"Ichigo no Kataomoi"	16	I ❤ Exciting Mini
1983	"Koi Anata Shidai!"	20	I ❤ Exciting Mini
1983	"Mizuiro no Love Letter"	19	Fairy, Sayuri
1984	"Sōshun Memory"	29	I ❤ Exciting Mini (1984)
1984	"Parallel Girl"	36	Fairy, Sayuri
1984	"Sotto Sayonara"	—	Romantic★Street
1985	"Koi no American★Patrol"	—	Dear Heart
1985	"Tomadoi"	—	Dear Heart
1985	"Namida no Silhouette"	—	Naturally
1987	"Namida ni Tenshi"	—	Non-album single
"—" denotes a recording that did not chart or was not released in that territory.
