= Orb: On the Movements of the Earth =

Japanese manga and anime series

- First tankōbon volume cover, featuring Rafal

チ。―地球の運動について― (Chi: Chikyū no Undō ni Tsuite)
- Genre: Historical; Mystery; Science fiction
- Manga
- Written by: Uoto
- Published by: Shogakukan
- English publisher: NA: Seven Seas Entertainment
- Magazine: Weekly Big Comic Spirits
- Original run: September 14, 2020 – April 18, 2022
- Volumes: 8
- Anime television series
- Directed by: Kenichi Shimizu
- Written by: Shingo Irie
- Music by: Kensuke Ushio
- Studio: Madhouse
- Licensed by: Netflix
- Original network: NHK General TV
- Original run: October 5, 2024 – March 15, 2025
- Episodes: 25
- icon

Orb: On the Movements of the Earth (Japanese: チ。―地球の運動について―, Hepburn: Chi: Chikyū no Undō ni Tsuite (Note: The kana "chi" can represent not only the kanji for "Earth; ground" (地), but also "wisdom; knowledge" (知), and "blood" (血).)) is a Japanese manga series written and illustrated by Uoto. It was serialized in Shogakukan's seinen manga magazine Weekly Big Comic Spirits from September 2020 to April 2022, with its chapters collected in eight tankōbon volumes. Set in 15th-century Europe, the series follows the dangerous journeys of scholars who risk their lives to pursue research on the forbidden heliocentric theory.

A 25-episode anime television series adaptation produced by Madhouse aired from October 2024 to March 2025.

By February 2025, the manga had over 5 million copies in circulation.

== Plot ==
=== Part 1 ===
In 15th-century Europe, (Note: Initially referred to as "Kingdom of P" and later revealed to be Poland.^{[ch. 1, 59]}) the Church tightly controls information, and dissent from its doctrine is heresy, punishable by death. Rafal, a child prodigy with a passion for astronomy, is raised by his adoptive father, Potocki, who urges him to study theology. However, Rafal's life changes when he is coerced by Hubert, a heretic scholar, into assisting with research on the Earth's movements. Initially skeptical, Rafal confirms the heliocentric model through his own calculations. Their secret work is discovered by Inquisitor Nowak, who finds Rafal's sketches. Hubert sacrifices himself, giving Rafal a pendant and taking the blame, leading to his execution. Rafal continues the research in secret but is confronted by Potocki, who warns him of the dangers, citing his own past struggles. When Rafal refuses to stop, Potocki reports him to Nowak. At his trial, Rafal refuses to recant and is sentenced to death. Before his execution, he commits suicide using smuggled poppy seeds, and his body is burned.

=== Part 2 ===
A decade later, duellists Oczy and Gras are tasked with guarding a heretic during transport, accompanied by Nowak. Gras, an amateur astronomer, records Mars' movements and expects it to complete its revolution. However, Mars unexpectedly retrogrades, frustrating Gras. The heretic reveals the location of a box containing astronomical research and gives Oczy the pendant before dying. Oczy and Gras retrieve the box but Gras falls to his death when a bridge collapses. Oczy seeks help from Badeni, a demoted priest, who agrees to study the box's contents if Oczy continues Gras' observations. They discover the research on heliocentrism and seek collaborators, enlisting Jolenta, a scholar's assistant, and Piast, a Ptolemaic model researcher. After Piast's death, Badeni completes the theory. However, Nowak investigates, leading to the arrest and execution of Badeni and Oczy. Jolenta, revealed to be Nowak's daughter, is spared by a sympathetic inquisitor, who fakes her death. Meanwhile, Badeni's parish priest discovers he transcribed Oczy's diary on vagabonds' heads.

=== Part 3 ===
Twenty-five years later, Schmidt, captain of the Heretic Liberation Force, retrieves Oczy's book under Jolenta's orders. Draka, a Romani woman, finds the book and burns it, reciting its contents to Jolenta in exchange for access to a printing press. When Nowak's forces attack, Jolenta sacrifices herself, allowing Draka and Schmidt to escape. Schmidt's group is betrayed, and they sacrifice themselves to help Draka reach Antoni, a bishop. Draka convinces Antoni to publish the heliocentric research, but Nowak intervenes, killing Antoni and burning the church. Nowak turns the blade on Draka, but she fatally wounds him before succumbing to her injuries. In his final moments, Nowak hallucinates Rafal and realizes his role as the villain of heliocentrism. Draka sends a letter via carrier pigeon before dying.

=== Final part ===
In 1468, a baker's assistant, Albert Brudzewski, refuses to enroll in university until a priest encourages him. As a child, Albert loved astronomy and shared his observations with his father, who introduced him to Rafal, a fanatical scholar. Rafal took Albert to a gathering of scholars but later murdered Albert's father for refusing to support his forbidden research. Rafal was captured, and Albert, traumatized, initially abandoned astronomy. After speaking with the priest, Albert enrolls in university. At one point, he happens upon Draka's letter being delivered to Potocki's former address, which inspires him to study heliocentrism. After teaching at university for twenty years, he writes a commentary on an astronomy textbook in 1482, influencing future scholars including a young Nicolaus Copernicus in 1491.

== Characters ==
=== Part 1 ===
Rafal (ラファウ, Rafau)
Voiced by: Maaya Sakamoto
A young prodigy adopted by Potocki who is set to enter university at the age of 12. Rafal has always excelled by making rational decisions. However, his interest was piqued by the beauty of the heliocentric theory, leading him to delve into forbidden research into the subject. His eventual suicide to evade persecution is what drives the plot forward.
Nowak (ノヴァク, Novaku)
Voiced by: Kenjiro Tsuda
An inquisitor who lacks a specific ideology, but believes it is his duty to protect the peace of the world, including his daughter, even if it means resorting to cruel actions.
Hubert (フベルト, Fuberuto)
Voiced by: Show Hayami
A heretic imprisoned for his forbidden research. In order to be released and continue his work, he feigned a change of heart. However, after meeting Rafal, Hubert reveals his research into the heliocentric theory, giving Rafal all his research before he is executed.
Potocki (ポトツキ, Pototsuki)
Voiced by: Kōichi Makishima
Rafal's foster father and professor at his school. He was found guilty of heresy for his study of astronomy in the past, also forcing Rafal to give up studying astronomy to instead focus on theology when he enters university.

=== Part 2 ===
Oczy (オクジー, Okujī)
Voiced by: Katsuyuki Konishi
A champion fighter with excellent eyesight, but has a fear of looking at the sky. His mindset is overwhelmingly negative, with no expectations for the world and a desire to reach heaven as soon as possible.
Gras (グラス, Gurasu)
Voiced by: Minoru Shiraishi
Oczy's comrade who, unlike Oczy, has an overwhelmingly positive outlook even in times of despair. He attributes this to his fascination with Mars, which he started documenting after his family was killed in the plague.
Badeni (バデーニ, Badēni)
Voiced by: Yuichi Nakamura
A monk obsessed with understanding the universe and proving himself above others. In his pursuit of knowledge, he disregards the rules of the church, leading to his eyes being burned and his subsequent banishment to a rural village.
Damian (ダミアン)
Voiced by: Yōji Ueda
A young inquisitor who recruits Nowak for help in his investigation against heretics. He eventually becomes a bishop and reforms his attitudes toward torture.
Jolenta (ヨレンタ, Yorenta)
Voiced by: Saya Hitomi, Toa Yukinari (adult)
A research assistant in the field of astronomy, she was accepted into a facility led by a renowned cosmologist Count Piast. However, she is not given the opportunity to conduct research to her full potential due to her gender. She is revealed to be Nowak's daughter, and she is unaware that Nowak is an inquisitor. She forms the Heretic Liberation Front after Antoni attempts to have her killed for heresy and fakes her death to remove Nowak from his position.
Kolbe (コルベ, Korube)
Voiced by: Nobunaga Shimazaki
Jolenta's colleague who acts supportive, but publishes Jolenta's research in his name to improve his standing.
Count Piast (ピャスト伯, Pyasuto Haku)
Voiced by: Shinya Fukumatsu, Daisuke Namikawa (young)
An astronomer who leads the research group Jolenta belongs to. Despite being a believer in geocentrism, he has devoted his life to learning the truth about the universe.
Antoni (アントニ)
Voiced by: Satoshi Mikami
A curate and eventual bishop, he is both arrogant and deeply devoted to the church. He views Nowak's inquisition as a threat to the church's future and a waste of money, attempting to kill Jolenta to weaken his influence. Unlike Nowak, he is willing to adapt to changes.

=== Part 3 ===
Draka (ドゥラカ, Duraka)
Voiced by: Miyuri Shimabukuro
The daughter of a nomadic Romani tribe, she has made significant contributions to the development of her village, but is unsatisfied with her life. She is obsessed with earning money, believing an excess of money will give her peace of mind, stemming from her experience of losing her father at a young age.
Schmidt (シュミット, Shumitto)
Voiced by: Satoshi Hino
The long-winded captain of the Heretic Liberation Front and a naturalist who seeks to revive a god that has not been corrupted by human morality. His goal is to weaken the orthodox faction and liberate freedom of information.
Lewandowski (レヴァンドロフスキ, Revandorofusuki)
Voiced by: Fuminori Komatsu
A reserved older member of the Heretic Liberation Front, and a close friend of Schmidt.
Frei (フライ, Furai)
Voiced by: Yūya Uchida
A soft-spoken younger member of the Heretic Liberation Front, and direct subordinate of Schmidt. He is actually a member of the church, sabotaging and later betraying Schmidt.
Dhruv (ドゥルーヴ, Durūbu)
Voiced by: Tomomichi Nishimura
Draka's uncle who raises Draka as her only blood relative left after her father's death. He teaches Draka that there is no god and to live with conviction. He will do anything to survive, including giving up Draka to save his own life.

=== Final part ===
Albert Brudzewski (アルベルト・ブルゼフスキ, Aruberuto Buruzefusuki)
Voiced by: Shōya Ishige, Atsumi Tanezaki (young)
A young man who works at a bakery, where he assists with various tasks. He used to have a passion for learning, but after a particular incident, he lost his interest in academics. After speaking with a priest in a booth, he renews his thirst for knowledge despite his trauma and heads to university.

== Media ==
=== Manga ===
Written and illustrated by Uoto, Orb: On the Movements of the Earth was serialized in Shogakukan's seinen manga magazine Weekly Big Comic Spirits from September 14, 2020, to April 18, 2022. Shogakukan collected its chapters in eight tankōbon, released from December 11, 2020, to June 30, 2022.

Seven Seas Entertainment has licensed the manga for English publication, releasing the manga in a 2-in-1 omnibus edition.

==== Volumes ====
No.	Original release date	Original ISBN	English release date	English ISBN
1	December 11, 2020	978-4-09-860778-5	November 21, 2023	979-8-88843-262-4
2	January 12, 2021	978-4-09-860801-0	November 21, 2023	979-8-88843-262-4
3	March 30, 2021	978-4-09-860878-2	March 19, 2024	979-8-88843-341-6
4	June 30, 2021	978-4-09-861071-6	March 19, 2024	979-8-88843-341-6
5	September 30, 2021	978-4-09-861146-1	August 20, 2024	979-8-88843-581-6
6	December 28, 2021	978-4-09-861206-2	August 20, 2024	979-8-88843-581-6
7	March 30, 2022	978-4-09-861260-4	December 17, 2024	979-8-88843-582-3
8	June 30, 2022	978-4-09-861317-5	December 17, 2024	979-8-88843-582-3

=== Anime ===
In June 2022, an anime adaptation produced by Madhouse was announced. It was later revealed to be a television series directed by Kenichi Shimizu and written by Shingo Irie, with Masanori Shino designing the characters, and Kensuke Ushio composing the music. The series aired for 25 episodes from October 5, 2024, to March 15, 2025, on NHK General TV. The opening theme song is "Kaijū" (怪獣; 'Monster'), performed by Sakanaction, while the first ending theme song is "Aporia" (アポリア), and the second ending theme song is "Hebi" (へび; 'Serpent'), both performed by Yorushika. Netflix licensed the series for worldwide simulcast.

==== Episodes ====
No.	Title	Directed by (Note: Production staff information is taken from the ending credits of each episode.)	Storyboard by	Original release date
Part 1
1	"Heliocentrism. How About That?"; Transliteration: "Chidōsetsu, to Demo Yobō ka" (Japanese: 『地動説』、とでも呼ぼうか)	Kotono Watanabe	Kenichi Shimizu	October 5, 2024 (Note: Episodes 1 and 2 premiered back-to-back.)
Rafal is an intelligent boy who has been accepted to the university at only 12. Rafal believes the world is full of fools, and he intends to live a rational life. He is the adopted son of the teacher Potocki, who tells Rafal he must stop studying astronomy and focus on theology. Potocki asks Rafal to pick up Hubert, a former student who has recently recanted for his heretical research. As they are walking back, Hubert asks Rafal if he studies astronomy, since he carries an astrolabe, and Rafal shows him his notes. Hubert then threatens Rafal into helping him continue his research since his eyes are weak now. Hubert takes Rafal to his stargazing spot, where he then tells Rafal about his work into heliocentrism.
2	"And Now... I'm Going to Move the Earth"; Transliteration: "Ima Kara, Chikyū o Ugokasu" (Japanese: 今から、地球を動かす)	Hiromichi Matano	Kenichi Shimizu	October 5, 2024
Rafal and Hubert argue, with Rafal doubting his theory. Despite initially not believing it was plausible, he has a gnawing feeling of doubt that continues to grow. As he digs deeper into his work, he discovers that the heliocentric theory is possible, and he is struck with how beautifully rational it is. He meets Hubert the next day, with Hubert deciding he no longer needs Rafal's help. When Rafal returns home, he finds Nowak, an inquisitor, has found his heliocentric notes. Hubert steps in and says they were his notes that he hid in Rafal's room. Hubert gives Rafal a pendant, before he is executed for heresy. Rafal figures out the pendant reveals the location of Hubert's notes, and inside is a letter telling Rafal to burn them. Rafal starts burning them, but changes his mind. On his last day before going to university, he tells the class that he will study astronomy instead of theology. Nowak is then shown torturing a suspected heretic, revealing he wants to protect his daughter from evil.
3	"I... Believe in Heliocentrism"; Transliteration: "Boku wa, Chidōsetsu o Shinjitemasu" (Japanese: 僕は、地動説を信じてます)	Masato Miyoshi	Kenichi Shimizu	October 12, 2024
After writing out all his research, Rafal burns some loose notes and leaves to hide his notes in Hubert's hiding spot. Potocki discovers a page in the hearth, deciding to make corrections, which surprises Rafal. Potocki is visited by Nowak, who suspects that Rafal is continuing Hubert's work. He threatens Potocki that if he does not turn in Rafal, he will likely be executed since he has already been accused of heresy, while Rafal still has a chance to recant. Potocki turns Rafal in and he is thrown into jail. Rafal grapples with why he is so obsessed with proving heliocentrism, until he becomes mesmerized with the moon beaming into his cell. At his trial, he confesses and is offered a chance to recant, but he chooses to believe in heliocentrism instead. On the eve of his torture, Nowak questions his choice, and Rafal reveals he has consumed a poppy seed poison. He explains he would rather die and keep the hope alive that someone will continue his work, like Hubert did. He dies peacefully and is burned at the stake. Ten years later, two men come across the box with Rafal's notes.
Part 2
4	"The Fact That This World is Far More Beautiful Than Heaven"; Transliteration: "Kono Chikyuu wa, Tengoku Nanka Yori mo Utsukushii" (Japanese: この地球は、天国なんかよりも美しい)	Asami Kawano	Hiroshi Kōjina	October 19, 2024
Ten years later, Oczy and Gras are introduced, with Gras having a fascination with the sky, and Oczy being afraid of it. They are duellists who have been paid by a count to duel another noble as his champion. Gras serves as witness to Oczy as he fights, who is revealed to be a skilled swordsman. Despite pleading to Oczy to spare his life, Oczy fulfills his duty and kills the noble. Oczy is gloomy and struggles to understand his purpose, while Gras on the other hand is exceedingly positive and approaches life logically. He explains to Oczy that he has found his purpose through his observations of Mars, which he has been mapping for almost two years. Later Gras begins to panic as he realizes that Mars has started to change direction, and his spirits are shattered seeing the perfectly circular orbit breaking. Oczy talks with fellow duellists and they reveal that Gras did not use to be so positive, and that he attempted suicide after his entire family was killed by a plague. The next day they are tasked with the transportation of a heretic condemned to death. The heretic taunts the two to question their own beliefs, and later reveals he has proof that life on Earth is beautiful, giving them the choice to pursue it. Oczy dismisses him, but Gras cuts the heretic's binding and turns his sword to Oczy.
5	"Even If I Die... This World Will Continue"; Transliteration: "Watashi ga Shindemo Kono Sekai wa Tsuzuku" (Japanese: 私が死んでもこの世界は続く)	Masato Miyoshi	Junichi Sakata	October 26, 2024
Gras throws the driver off the wagon and attempts to flee, but Nowak (who is accompanying the transport with Damian) crashes the wagon by shooting the horse. Nowak does not believe Oczy as he tries to surrender, and as Nowak is about to stab Oczy, the heretic jumps in front and is stabbed instead. The heretic gives Oczy Hubert's pendant before dying, and the pair escape into the hills to find the box. They eventually find the box and read a letter from the heretic, who recounts the story of his discovery of the box. Because they are not capable of understanding the contents of the box, Gras suggests they bring it to Badeni, the monk who introduced him to Mars. They begin to cross a river on the way to the village when suddenly the bridge collapses, and Oczy is stuck grasping the edge and barely holding onto Gras. Gras tells Oczy he has two choices, either turn over the materials and get closer to heaven, or continue the research and place his faith in the world. Gras lets go to save Oczy, accepting his fate and falling to his death. Oczy decides to take Gras' notes and the pendant to Badeni, continuing the mission Gras started.
6	"Move… The World"; Transliteration: "Sekai o, Ugokase" (Japanese: 世界を、動かせ)	Kotono Watanabe	Tao Hazuki	November 2, 2024
Oczy meets with Badeni, a scarred clergyman who has little patience for others. Oczy asks Badeni to come with him to analyze the notes. Badeni compliments the detail of Gras' notes, but he thinks Oczy is just wasting his time. In a flashback, Badeni is shown to be a genius in algebra and geometry, but is punished for not fitting in. He is obsessed with understanding the motion of the planets and why their orbits retrograde, but the abbot forbids him from continuing his work. One day he spots a forbidden text in the abbot's room, and he is caught attempting to read it. As punishment, the abbot banishes him to a remote monastery and pours hot wax in his eyes. In the present, Badeni changes his mind and says he will analyze the documents, but only if Oczy does observations for him since his eyes are damaged. Oczy initially struggles because of his fear of the sky, but pushes through to try and understand why Gras and the heretic smiled as they died. Badeni analyzes the documents and realizes that they are about the heliocentric theory. Oczy realizes that heaven and Earth are one, and the world is not as corrupt as he thought. He finally looks up at the sky, no longer afraid.
7	"Matters of the Truth"; Transliteration: "Shinri no Tamenara" (Japanese: 真理のためなら)	Hiroki Mori	Koji Sawai	November 9, 2024
Jolenta is an ambitious astronomy research assistant, but faces discrimination since she is a woman. She works for Kolbe, a seemingly kind researcher who offers to show her treatise to the head of the institute. Badeni agrees to continue working on the heliocentric theory, but only if Oczy helps, which Oczy agrees to. Jolenta visits home, and it is revealed that Nowak is her father. Badeni and Oczy need someone with resources to continue their work, so Badeni devises a plan to find a willing candidate by posting a difficult problem on bulletin boards, which rich nobles try to solve as a pastime. Kolbe tells Jolenta that Count Piast praised her treatise, which makes Jolenta happy, until Kolbe reveals that he published her work under his name. Count Piast overhears their conversation and asks Jolenta if she wrote the treatise, but pressured by Kolbe, she denies it was her work. Jolenta comes across Badeni's problem and decides to try to answer it. Realizing it requires access to astronomical records, she anxiously decides to use the records in Kolbe's office while he is away. Jolenta returns to post her answer, and Badeni stops her as she does.
8	"We Must Become Icarus"; Transliteration: "Ikarosu ni Naraneba" (Japanese: イカロスにならねば)	Kotono Watanabe	Kotono Watanabe	November 16, 2024
Badeni asks Jolenta about the answer she posted, but she nervously lies that she just posted on behalf of her master. Badeni tries to get the identity of her master, but she lies again. Badeni asks if they can speak in private, realizing she was the one who solved the problem. Badeni pushes her to consider that the Earth may be moving, which causes her to send them away in fear. Count Piast spots her later and asks why she does not attend the research meetings. He tells her that scripture says women do not belong in academia, but he believes that the interpretation could be wrong. He tells her to bring her treatises to him directly, revealing he knew Kolbe stole her work. The next day Jolenta brings a cautious Badeni to Count Piast to ask for resources, but they are sent away since Count Piast has spent his life trying to prove geocentrism. Count Piast later recounts when he was outcast from his family for pursuing astronomy, being given a golden astrolabe by a dedicated relative who believed in him and pushed him to prove a unified theory of the cosmos.
9	"This is What It Means... To Learn Something, I Think"; Transliteration: "Kitto Sore ga, Nanika o Shiru to iu Kotoda" (Japanese: きっとそれが、何かを知るということだ)	Asami Kawano	Asami Kawano	November 23, 2024
In a flashback, Piast recounts his professor asking him to continue his work and prove his theory, using a geocentric model and epicycles. Piast turns down the offer, having an inkling of doubt after an expected observation. On his deathbed, the professor asks Piast to tell him the truth when they meet in heaven, and he dies soon after, with Piast feeling compelled to finish his work. In the present, Piast meets with the trio again and says he will let them use his archives, but only if they can observe Venus in its final phase, which was an anomaly Piast observed many years ago. Oczy is the only one with clear enough eyesight to make the observation, but he feels conflicted with how this will affect his faith. The time comes to make the observation, and Oczy observes a full Venus, suggesting a heliocentric model is possible. Piast breaks down and accuses them of lying, but remembering his professor's dying words, he decides to hand over his records so the truth can be found. With the records to continue their research, Badeni tells Jolenta that she should stop helping them for her safety, and she agrees. That night, Piast has a coughing fit and dies looking at the stars, ready to tell his professor the truth.
10	"Truth"; Transliteration: "Chi" (Japanese: 『知』)	Hiromichi Matano	Kenichi Shimizu	November 30, 2024
Badeni witnesses Oczy attempting to read after Jolenta taught him, and Oczy describes his desire to write about his life. Badeni tells him it is dangerous and that only certain people should be allowed to read and write. The other member of Badeni's church, Father Grabowski, is dedicated to helping the people of the village, and is frustrated with how arrogant Badeni is. He later learns that Badeni got his scars from a duel with a former friend who stole his research, and feels conflicted knowing he has killed before. While visiting the library, Grabowski stumbles upon Piast's notes containing all his work, which he dropped the night he died. Badeni is frustrated because no matter what he tries, the records do not make sense with circular orbits. He suddenly has an epiphany after looking at Hubert's necklace that maybe the orbits could be elliptical. He delves deeper into his work, while Oczy works on digging an escape tunnel from their barn to the church and writing his story in his book. Some time later, Oczy finds Badeni staring into the distance, saying that he has completed the heliocentric theory. Elsewhere, the bishop speaks to a new group of inquisitors, saying it is their duty to save the heretics who have been led astray.
11	"Terror"; Transliteration: "Chi" (Japanese: 『血』)	Masatoyo Takada	Masatoyo Takada	December 7, 2024
Two new inquisitor recruits meet Nowak, who is tasked with instructing them. They meet the curate Antoni, who has a strong disdain for the inquisitors. Nowak reveals that he is the son of the bishop and suggests he might not actually be celibate. The three start the torture of a woman, with the first recruit using a device to crush her thumb. The other recruit refuses, forcing the other recruit to continue until the woman confesses. Afterwards, Nowak tells them that they need to change how they view their jobs, and terror is what is needed to maintain the world as they know it. Nowak is suddenly called to deal with a case related to the cosmos. Badeni and Oczy meet with Jolenta, with Badeni announcing that the work has been finished and he plans to leave the clergy and move to a place where he can publish it. While they are talking about their dreams for the future, Nowak suddenly appears, casually talking as Jolenta's father. They part ways, with Nowak showing no sign of knowing of their guilt, and Oczy starts telling Badeni about how he has met Nowak before. Suddenly Nowak appears again alone, revealing he is an inquisitor.
12	"Heliocentrism is My Faith"; Transliteration: "Ore wa, Chidōsetsu o Shinkō Shi Teru" (Japanese: 俺は、地動説を信仰してる)	Asami Kawano	Kenichi Shimizu	December 14, 2024
Despite revealing he is an inquisitor, he says he is not there to apprehend them, only to investigate their research after an anonymous tip based on Piast's notes came in. Badeni takes them to their shed and shows him his research, claiming it is related to astrology and Mars. Nowak looks through and does not find anything suspicious, but right as he is ready to leave, he spots Hubert's necklace on the desk. Nowak leaves without acknowledging the necklace, making Oczy think he is safe, but Badeni decides they must leave now. They begin burning what they do not need and say their goodbyes. As Oczy is about to escape via the tunnel, he spots the inquisitor carriage in the distance. With not enough time for Badeni to escape, Oczy picks up his sword to fight, allowing Badeni a chance to escape. Badeni says he is making a mistake and he will likely go to hell, but Oczy says heliocentrism is his faith now, and Badeni blesses him before leaving. Oczy stops the carriage on the road and he kills the other soldiers, leaving just Nowak and himself to duel.
13	"Freedom"; Transliteration: "Jiyū o" (Japanese: 『自由』を)	Masateru Matsumura	Kenichi Shimizu	December 21, 2024
Nowak asks Oczy if he is prepared to die, and they duel. Oczy breaks his sword, and he lets Nowak stab his arm so he can pin him. Right as Oczy is about to kill Nowak, other soldiers arrive and shoot Oczy, saving Nowak. Nowak orders the soldiers to take Oczy to a doctor so he can be interrogated. Oczy has a dream where he is in a tower that looms far over the clouds, and a man questions what grand ideal he has been fighting for. He wakes up a week later to see Nowak, who tells him he is to be tortured before his death. They talk, and Oczy tells him that the grand ideal he has been fighting for is freedom, which Nowak does not understand. In a flashback, Badeni burns the book that Oczy has been writing, and says that nothing should be left behind, even if it means that they will be tortured more for not giving anything up. Instead of interrogating Oczy, Nowak reveals that Badeni has also been caught, and Nowak will torture Oczy to get Badeni to talk. Badeni does not give anything up and claims that all the notes from ten years ago have been destroyed, but Nowak does not believe him.
14	"Tonight's Sky..."; Transliteration: "Kyō no Kono Sora wa" (Japanese: 今日のこの空は)	Kotono Watanabe	Kotono Watanabe	December 28, 2024
Nowak continues to torture Oczy, ripping his mouth apart, and Badeni continues to claim that all the documents have been destroyed, but Nowak continues, using his anger for them approaching his daughter. When Nowak threatens to stab Oczy in the eye, Badeni finally gives in, taking Nowak to the stone chest of research. Nowak tells Badeni about Rafal, who killed himself at only 12 to save this work. As they are getting ready for their execution, Badeni tells Oczy that one document still remains, the book that he wrote. Relieved that some hope still remains, the two calmly admire the stars and look back on their journey, accepting their death by hanging. Later, the two inquisitor recruits interrogate Jolenta, who is surprised to learn her father is an inquisitor. She pretends she knows nothing, but right as she was about to be released, Antoni forces them to torture her, citing the fact that she is a woman scholar. Antoni starts by pulling out one of her teeth, but the two recruits are apprehensive. One of the recruits then overhears that Antoni is using his accusation of Jolenta to get rid of Nowak, who he sees as a threat. The recruit decides to set her free, telling her she needs to run.
15	"Is it... My Turn?"; Transliteration: "Watashi no, Banna no Ka?" (Japanese: 私の、番なのか？)	Masato Miyoshi	Koji Sawai	January 4, 2025
Antoni interrogates the recruit who let Jolenta go, before ordering Nowak to be informed that Jolenta was found guilty of being a heretic and that she was burned at the stake, despite this not being true. When asked who should be burnt at the stake instead, Antoni says to use the recruit who let Jolenta go. Nowak rushes only to see the burning recruit, who he thinks is Jolenta. Antoni lies and says he tried to stop it, giving Nowak Jolenta's gloves and pretending to be sympathetic. A distraught Nowak flashes back to when he first gave Jolenta the gloves, which he got so she could study even when it was cold. Back in the present he breaks down and cries seeing her gloves. Father Grabowski, who sent the tip about Badeni, feels guilt about Badeni being executed. In his study, he finds a letter from Badeni, who asks him to meet with some beggars who he had been giving bread to, offering a poem from Lucretius as payment. When he meets the beggars, they shave their heads and reveal that Badeni tattooed 60 pages of Oczy's book on their heads, leaving Grabowski the choice to keep the hope alive.
Part 3
16	"It's Time to Begin the Operation"; Transliteration: "Kōdō o Kaishi Suru" (Japanese: 行動を開始する)	Asami Kawano	Asami Kawano	January 11, 2025
Twenty-five years later, soldiers bring in Captain Schmidt, the leader of the Heretic Liberation Front, which is an extremist group that attacks inquisitors and frees accused heretics. An inquisitor interrogates Schmidt until suddenly the two soldiers who captured Schmidt barge in and free Schmidt, revealing they are actually working with Schmidt. They use explosives, something unknown to people of that time, to kill the guards and break into a vault to steal a book. As they leave, several freed heretics ask to join Schmidt's squad, but they end up refusing to partake in his initiation test, which requires them to denounce the holy scripture and the church. Schmidt flashes back to when he was a kid, and how his parents were murdered by his uncle for refusing to denounce the orthodoxy. In the present, they travel to an abandoned village to wait for their leader, and Schmidt asks Frei to decipher the book, asking him to look for the names Oczy or Badeni. Frei is ambushed by a church soldier, forcing him to hide the book in a desk, with the trio eventually running away to regroup and recover the book later. Antoni, now a bishop, is shown having captured a dark-skinned man with a scar.
17	"I Could Make a Lot of Money with This Book... Maybe"; Transliteration: "Kono Hon de Dai Kasegi Dekiru, Kamo" (Japanese: この本で大稼ぎできる、かも)	Hiromichi Matano	Koji Sawai	January 18, 2025
Draka is a young woman living in a Romani community, scavenging abandoned villages for fabrics and valuables to trade. She has an excellent memory, drawing maps after only one time visiting. She lives with her uncle Dhruv, who is her only living relative. Despite contributing greatly to her community, she is frustrated that all profits are shared equally and the chief's refusal to improve moneymaking efficiency. In a flashback, she remembers advice her uncle gave her. He asserts that God is not real, and once you accept that, you can find peace by thinking critically and having convictions. Thinking critically about her father, who died while plundering and left only a bloody pile of money for Draka, she concludes that money will give her safety and drive the fear from her heart. Dhruv sneaks out of the village to drink wine, but he is caught by Antoni, who arrests him and threatens to hang him. He offers a young woman in exchange for his life, which Antoni accepts. The next day, Dhruv lures Draka to the abandoned village and tells her to wait, where she finds Oczy's book hidden inside a house. Understanding its significance, she believes that she can make money from the book. Antoni then arrives, and Dhruv apologizes, saying he will do anything to survive.
18	"To Liberate Information"; Transliteration: "Jōhō o Kaihō Suru" (Japanese: 情報を解放する)	Mitsuyuki Masuhara	Koji Sawai	January 25, 2025
Antoni talks with Draka, and after realizing her intelligence, he decides to take her back to the church. Noticing the book she is carrying, he orders her to hand it over, only to be interrupted by Schmidt and his unit attacking. Antoni flees with his soldiers, but Dhruv is fatally wounded in the attack. Schmidt orders Draka to hand over the book, but she refuses. Determined to change her fate, she burns the book, forcing Schmidt to rely on Draka and her excellent memory to access the contents of the book. On the way to Schmidt's leader, Draka and he discuss their views, agreeing in their disdain for the church orthodoxy, but Schmidt is upset that she does not believe in God. After stopping to appreciate the light of the new day, Schmidt decides to tell Draka their plan. They plan to use the newly invented printing press to publish Oczy's book, with the intention of weakening the influence of the orthodoxy. With the help of the Reformation, they hope to liberate the freedom of information. They arrive at the location of their leader, who is revealed to be a 39-year-old Jolenta.
19	"Wandering is How You Find What's Right"; Transliteration: "Mayoi no Naka ni Rinri ga Aru" (Japanese: 迷いの中に倫理がある)	Hiroki Mori	Kotono Watanabe	February 1, 2025
Damian, now a bishop, scolds a young inquisitor Asch for using brutal methods of torture and burning people at the stake. Damian believes these cruel methods are destroying the people's trust in the orthodoxy, but Asch argues that these methods are necessary to protect the world from heretics, citing the recent attack by Schmidt and his theft of the book. Asch describes how the book was found in an abandoned church and the only identifiable information was a reference to Potocki, which Damian recognizes from his work on the case back when Rafal was arrested. Damian sends Asch to find Nowak, who is employed by Damian but is no longer an inquisitor, instead spending his days drinking over Jolenta, who he still believes to be dead. At first Nowak sends Asch away, but remembering the pain heliocentrism has caused him, he decides to join the investigation, quickly realizing their plan is to mass-produce the book. Jolenta makes a deal with Draka, offering her access to their printing press to produce something to sell, which Draka agrees to. Jolenta transcribes the entire book from Draka, feeling like she has reunited with Oczy again.
20	"I Love Heliocentrism"; Transliteration: "Watashi wa, Chidōsetsu o Aishite Iru" (Japanese: 私は、地動説を愛している)	Masataka Takada	Masataka Takada	February 8, 2025
Asch wakes up Nowak, revealing that someone from the village has informed them of Jolenta's hideout, and Nowak tells Asch to assemble a squadron of soldiers. Draka talks with Lewandowski, who tells Draka that he fights so that he can face death without fear, recounting the death of his sister from disease when she was young. Schmidt also tells of his reasons, arguing that technology is destroying God's world and causing misery for the people living in it. Draka then learns more about Jolenta's reasons, how she wants to end the orthodoxy and allow for the freedom of expression that has been denied by the church her entire life. Jolenta gives Draka a letter, entrusting her to deliver it, despite Draka's reservations. Schmidt then informs them that two carriages of soldiers are approaching, so Jolenta tells them to flee while she distracts them. Jolenta looks up at the stars and recounts the events of her life, before lighting a large explosive and blowing herself and the soldiers away. Nowak catches a glimpse of Jolenta, also inspecting her blown-up hand, leaving him confused as to why she would do that. Draka and Schmidt's squad escape by carriage, but are stopped by two knights in the process.
21	"The Times Are Changing"; Transliteration: "Jidai wa Kawaru" (Japanese: 時代は変わる)	Tomoya Kitagawa	Tomoya Kitagawa	February 15, 2025
The knights ask about their business, with Schmidt lying and providing forged documents. The knights let them go, but one requests a cloth for a torch, and to prevent them from discovering the printing materials, Draka gives away the shawl that belonged to her father. They arrive at the printing press facility, where the rest of the Heretic Liberation Front soldiers are waiting. Because several movable types were damaged, they believed they would have to halt production until they could acquire lead to make new ones, but Draka offers the pile of lead coins from her father instead. They begin printing the book On the Movements of the Earth. Before they finish printing, Frei betrays them by killing all the horses. After a brief duel, Schmidt disarms and kills Frei. Without horses to escape, the group weighs their options, whether to all run and hope someone escapes, or work together to allow Draka to escape, who promises to convince Antoni to publish the book. Draka decides to leave the choice up to chance, flipping a coin, which chooses everyone to run. Schmidt decides to overturn the result and commits to letting Draka escape.
22	"Neither of You Will be Known to History"; Transliteration: "Kimi-ra wa Rekishi no Tōjō Jinbutsu Janai" (Japanese: 君らは歴史の登場人物じゃない)	Asami Kawano	Kenichi Shimizu	February 22, 2025
Asch is still traumatized by the explosion that killed Jolenta, soon arriving at the printing press location. To distract the soldiers, the Heretic Liberation Front members make a shield wall to draw them in, allowing Schmidt and Draka to steal two horses. Nowak chases after Schmidt and Draka, with Schmidt attacking Nowak and his soldiers. He kills two, but gets stabbed from behind by Nowak, who passes out from a head wound, eventually waking up and following Draka's footprints. Draka reaches Antoni and pitches the idea of printing books to make money, eventually telling him about the book she wants to publish. While he initially scoffs at her request, he begins to realize how heliocentrism is not suppressed elsewhere. Because his father, who was the former bishop, is no longer around to punish people for heliocentrism, Draka argues the time is right to bring it to the world. After agreeing on how to split the profits, Draka asks for Antoni's carrier pigeon to send Jolenta's letter. Nowak arrives at the church and is shocked to see Antoni with Draka. Antoni explains how heliocentrism is not actually blasphemous, and the suppression was likely started by his father who used to study astronomy. His father only had Nowak deal with heliocentrism and kept all matters off the record, leaving Nowak feeling like he had been manipulated.
23	"Comrades"; Transliteration: "Onaji Jidai o Tsukutta Nakama" (Japanese: 同じ時代を作った仲間)	Hiroki Mori	Kenichi Shimizu	March 1, 2025
Antoni tries to defuse the situation, but Nowak reveals that he has told the guards he was investigating heliocentrism at the church, planning to frame heliocentrism as dangerous. Nowak stabs Antoni, and as Draka tries to run, he sets fire to the church and stabs Draka. She takes the knife and stabs Nowak back, before running through the fire and escaping. As Nowak is dying, he has a vision of Rafal. Nowak feels regret, telling Rafal how he finally realized he is the villain of this story. Nowak asks if Jolenta made it to heaven, and Rafal says that is for him to figure out. Nowak then pulls out Jolenta's hand from after the explosion and puts her gloves on it, revealing a perfect fit. Nowak breaks down and prays to God that she be spared and let into heaven, before eventually succumbing to his wounds. Draka escapes the village and sends the letter with the pigeon. Realizing she is going to die from her wounds, she feels regret and fear knowing there is no afterlife, until suddenly the rising sun hits her face and fills her with a sense of peace as she dies. Now 1468 in the Kingdom of Poland, Albert Brudzewski works in a bakery and rejects an offer to attend university, citing trauma from his past.
Final part
24	"Thaumazein"; Transliteration: "Taumazein o" (Japanese: タウマゼインを)	Masamitsu Isoma	Asami Kawano	March 8, 2025
The baker tells Albert the concept of arete, and that everyone has to find their place, suggesting Albert is running away from his potential. He is asked to deliver bread to a church, where he finds the pastor inside a confession booth. Despite his reservations, the pastor convinces Albert to open up about his past. He describes how he was born a free peasant and was raised by his father, who placed special emphasis on learning. He recalls his father telling him he should always doubt his curiosity, and that learning should always be done to benefit humanity. To help with his studies, his father arranged for a tutor, who turns out to be Rafal. Rafal teaches Albert about the constellations and tries to convince him that it is okay for him to learn because he wants to, even if no one benefits from it. He becomes excited to learn and improves greatly, earning the praise of Rafal. Rafal decides to invite Albert to a meeting of scholars, where ideas can be freely shared and discussed.
25	"Question" (Japanese: ?)	Asami Kawano	Yoshiaki Kawajiri	March 15, 2025
Rafal leaves to run an errand, and Albert stays to talk with the other scholars. He suddenly remembers he forgot to record his observations for the day and decides to return home. When he arrives home, he discovers Rafal standing over his dead father. Rafal explains he came to ask for materials his father had about heliocentrism, but his father refused to share them. After his father became angry and threatened to burn the materials, Rafal decided to kill him to save the knowledge, contrasting the Rafal introduced earlier in the story. Rafal is captured by the townspeople and Albert becomes traumatized. In the present, the pastor tells Albert he must pursue his purpose so he will be worthy of God's grace, and suggests he looks at the sky again and considers university. Albert overcomes his trauma and once again appreciates the stars, vowing to pursue truth. Albert walks by the former residence of Potocki, with the current owner receiving the letter sent by Draka. He is confused, not knowing anything about Potocki, and Albert overhears him mention the book title On the Movements of the Earth, which causes him to ponder what that could mean. He would go on to write a commentary on astronomy that was used by Nicolaus Copernicus, who would eventually go on to publish his heliocentric theory, finally ending the journey set forth by Rafal.

=== Other ===
The manga was featured in the music video for Amazarashi's song "1.0" on March 30, 2022, with the video showing lyrics using letterpress printing on art from the series. It was also featured in the music video for Amazarashi's song "Cassiopeia Mooring" (カシオピア係留所, Kashiopia Keiryū-sho), released on June 30, 2022, with characters from the series and their dialogue being projected onto the planetarium of the Itabashi Science and Education Museum in Tokyo.

== Reception ==
By February 2025, the manga had over 5 million copies in circulation. The manga was recommended by manga artists Hitoshi Iwaaki and Shin Takahashi. Chi was nominated for the 14th Manga Taishō in 2021 and placed second with 67 points; it was nominated for the 15th edition in 2022 and placed fifth with 59 points. It was nominated for the Next Manga Award in 2021 and placed tenth in the print category. The series ranked 37th on the 2021 "Book of the Year" list by Da Vinci magazine; it ranked 21st on the 2022 list. It ranked second on Takarajimasha's Kono Manga ga Sugoi! 2022 list of best manga for male readers. It won the Mandō Kobayashi Manga Grand Prix 2021, created by comedian and manga enthusiast Kendo Kobayashi.

The manga was nominated for the 67th Shogakukan Manga Award in the general category in 2021; it was also nominated for the 68th edition in the same category in 2022. The series ranked fifth on the Nationwide Bookstore Employees' Recommended Comics of 2022. The manga was nominated for the 46th Kodansha Manga Award in the general category in 2022. The series won the 26th Tezuka Osamu Cultural Prize in 2022. The manga won the 54th Seiun Award in the Best Comic category in 2023.

At the 10th Crunchyroll Anime Awards in 2026, the anime was nominated for Best Drama.
