= Mainichi Kaasan =

Japanese comedy manga series by Rieko Saibara

毎日かあさん
- Genre: Comedy
- Manga
- Written by: Rieko Saibara
- Published by: The Mainichi Newspapers Co.
- Magazine: Mainichi Shimbun
- Original run: October 2002 – 26 June 2017
- Volumes: 14
- Anime television series
- Directed by: Mitsuru Hongo
- Studio: Studio Gallop (eps. 1–96); TYO Animations (eps. 97–142); Dong Woo Animation (all episodes)
- Original network: TV Tokyo
- Original run: 1 April 2009 – 25 March 2012
- Episodes: 142
- Live-action film
- Directed by: Shōtarō Kobayashi
- Written by: Katsuhiko Manabe
- Released: 5 February 2011
- Runtime: 114 minutes

Mainichi Kaasan (毎日かあさん; lit. 'Everyday Mom') is a Japanese comedy manga series written and illustrated by Rieko Saibara, based on her experiences as a housewife and mother. It was serialized on a weekly basis in the Mainichi Shimbun newspaper's morning edition from October 2002 to 26 June 2017. The manga was later collected into 14 tankōbon volumes. It won several awards, including the Excellence Award at the 8th Japan Media Arts Festival in 2004, the Short Story Award at the Tezuka Osamu Cultural Prizes in 2005, and the President of the House of Councilors Award at the 40th Japan Cartoonist Awards in 2011. Mainichi Kaasan was adapted into an anime television series directed by Mitsuru Hongo that aired on TV Tokyo from 1 April 2009 to 25 March 2012. Spanning 142 episodes, the anime was licensed in English under the title Kaasan: Mom's Life on Crunchyroll's video streaming website. Mainichi Kaasan was also adapted into a live-action film directed by Shōtarō Kobayashi, released in theaters in Japan on 5 February 2011. The film starred the real-life divorced couple Kyōko Koizumi and Masatoshi Nagase as the titular kaasan and her husband. It won the Best Film for Asian New Talent Award at the 14th Shanghai International Film Festival in 2011. Additionally, Koizumi won the Best Actress Award at the 66th Mainichi Film Awards in 2012 and Nagase won the Best Actor Award at the 20th Japanese Movie Critics Awards.
