= Miki Tori =

Japanese manga artist (born 1958)

Miki Tori とり·みき
- Born: 23 February 1958; Hitoyoshi, Kumamoto Prefecture, Japan
- Known for: Manga artist
- Notable work: Dai-Hon'ya; SF Taishō
- Awards: see below

Miki Tori (とり·みき, Tori Miki; born February 23, 1958 in Hitoyoshi, Kumamoto Prefecture, Japan), also known as Micky Bird or Mickey Bird, is a Japanese manga artist, character designer, essayist, and screenplay writer. Tori has won multiple awards for his work, including two Seiun Awards (in 1994 for Dai-Hon'ya, and in 1998 for SF Taishō) and one Bungeishunjū Manga Award (in 1995 for Tōku e Ikitai). His pen name was created by mixing up the pronunciation of the kanji making up his real name. He worked as a writer on WXIII: Patlabor the Movie 3.

Tori attended Meiji University, majoring in English literature, though he left his studies before receiving a degree. He was a member of the rakugo research club during his time there, and attended at the same time as owarai, tarento, and senpai Masayuki Watanabe.

He made his professional debut in 1979 after winning an honorable mention for his story My Alien (ぼくの宇宙人, Boku no Uchūjin) at the 12th Shōnen Champion Rookie Manga Awards, after which he became known mainly for his gag manga such as Kuru Kuru Kurin and Tōku e Ikitai, as well as manga featuring science fiction elements. For many years, his manga appeared in the television guide "TV Bros."

== Works ==
=== Manga ===
- Komaken Harēshon (1979, Weekly Shōnen Champion, Akita Shoten)
  - released in the tankōbon Shimatta.
- Shimatta. (1979–1984, Jets Comics, Hakusensha)
- Bara no Susumu-sama (1980, Weekly Shōnen Champion, Akita Shoten)
- Runrun Company (1980–1982, Weekly Shōnen Champion, Akita Shoten)
- Tamanegi Parco (1981–1982, Monthly Shōnen Champion, Akita Shoten)
- Sukekoma-kun (1982, Young Champion, Akita Shoten)
- Rare Masters (1982–1994, Kawade Personal Comics, Kawade Shobō Shinsha)
- Yūsei kara Bishōjo X (1983, Petit Apple Pie, Tokuma Shoten)
- Kuru Kuru Kurin (1983–1984, Weekly Shōnen Champion, Akita Shoten)
  - made into a Fuji TV drama series starring Sayuri Iwai, Joe Shishido, Hisahiro Ogura, and Narimi Arimori
- Torimikin!! (1983–1984, Jets Comics, Hakusensha)
- Yoshida-san Kiki Ippatsu (1983–1986, Super Action, Futabasha
- Tokimeki Brain (1984, Monthly Shōnen Champion, Akita Shoten)
  - released in the tankōbon Uratori
- Uratori (1984–1986, CBS/Sony Comics, CBS/Sony Shuppan)
- Poritan (1985, Monthly Comi Comi, Hakusensha)
- Ai no Sakaagari (1985–1986, Heiban Punch, Magazine House)
- Damatte Ore no Tsuite Koi (1985–1986, Seirindō)
- A Heebie Jeebie (1986–1987, Monthly Comi Comi, Hakusensha)
- Sharibari (1987, Super Action, Futabasha)
- Anywhere But Here (1988–2003, TV Bros., Tokyo News Tsūshinsha, released in tankōbon by Kawade Shobō Shinsha, published in North America by Fantagraphics Books)
- Tori no Ichi (1987–1989, Seirindō)
- Yama no Oto (1988, SF Magazine, Hayakawa Shobō)
- Terrible Shōnendan (1989, Weekly Shōnen Sunday, Shogakukan)
- Tori Miki no Kinekomika (1989–1992, Sony Magazines)
- Tori Miki no Mō Anshin (1989–1993, Seirindō)
- Kenka no Ichizoku (1990–1993, Tokuma Shoten)
- Dai-Hon'ya (created by Kansei Takita, 1992–1993, ASCII Comics, ASCII Shuppansha)
- Tori Miki no Jiken no Chiheisen (1993–1997, Chikuma Shobō)
- Tomason no Wana (1994–1995, Comic'○○, Bungeishunju)
- SF Taishō (1994–1996, SF Magazine, Hayakawa Shobō)
- Man'en Gannen no Rugby (created by Yasutaka Tsutsui, 1995, Jitsugyō no Nihonsha)
- Hitotachi (1995, Manga Share da!!, Bunkasha)
- Shakujin Densetsu (1995-current, Comic Bingo, Bungeishunju)
- Doyō Waide Satsujin Jiken (co-authored with Masami Yuki, 1996–1997, Weekly Shōnen Captain, Tokuma Shoten)
- "Gyōdai Chōdai" (1998–1999, Bunkasha)
- Bōchōsuru Jiken (2002, Chikuma Shobō)
- The Last Book Man (co-authored with Kansei Takita, 2002, Hayakawa Shobō)
- Excite na Jiken (co-authored with Gō Ōhinata, 2004, Akita Shoten)
- Reishoku Sōsakan (2008, Weekly Morning, Kodansha)
- PLINIVS (co-authored with Mari Yamazaki, Shinchōsha)

=== Non-manga books ===
- Tori no Me Hito no Me (1989, Chikuma Shobō, essays)
- Fukikae Eiga Daijiten (co-authored with the Dubbing Admiration Society (吹替愛好会, Fukikae Aikōkai), 1995, San-Ichi Shobo)
- Mangaka no Himitsu: Tori Miki & Ninki Sakka Kyūnin no Honne Talk (1997, Tokuma Shoten)
  - The nine include Go Nagai, Masami Yuki, Sensha Yoshida, Noriko Nagano, Hideo Azuma, Kotobuki Shiriagari, Hisashi Eguchi, Naoki Karasawa, and Mitsue Aoki
- Tori Miki no Eiga Fukikae-Ō (2004, Yosensha)

=== Anime ===
- Majo demo Steady (1986, Hayakawa Shobō, character designer)

== Television ==
- Tsuru-chan no Omoikkiri Poko Poko (1986, TV Asahi, regular appearances on the "Itaibanashi" segment derived from Ai no Sakaagari)

== Awards ==
- 1979: Honorable Mention, Akita Shoten 12th Shōnen Champion Rookie Manga Awards for My Alien
- 1993: Winner, 1st Ankoku Seiun Awards for Akanegumo-chan (ni yoru Live) (あかね雲ちゃん(によるライブ))
- 1994: Winner (Comics category), 25th Seiun Awards for Dai-Hon'ya
- 1995: Winner, 41st Bungeishunjū Manga Awards for Tōku e Ikitai
- 1998: Winner (Comics category), 29th Seiun Awards for SF Taishō
