= Tonari no Seki no Inkya Joshi ga Oshi Utaite Datta =

Japanese manga series

- Tonari no Seki no Inkya Joshi ga Oshi Utaite Datta: Ore no Kyoku o Uttatekure!
- First tankōbon volume cover

隣の席の陰キャ女子が推し歌い手だった ～俺の曲を歌ってくれ！～
- Genre: Romantic comedy
- Manga
- Written by: Ame Satō
- Published by: Takeshobo
- Imprint: Bamboo Comics
- Magazine: Storia Dash
- Original run: July 5, 2024 – present
- Volumes: 4

Tonari no Seki no Inkya Joshi ga Oshi Utaite Datta: Ore no Kyoku o Uttatekure! (隣の席の陰キャ女子が推し歌い手だった ～俺の曲を歌ってくれ！～) is a Japanese manga series written and illustrated by Ame Satō. It began serialization on Takeshobo's Storia Dash service in July 2024, and has been compiled into three volumes as of January 2026.

== Plot ==
The series follows Tsunagu Kurose, a high school student and a budding singer. He posts songs he sang and wrote online, although he has few followers, and listeners criticize him due to his poor singing voice. He is a big fan of the online singer Icy, while being conscious of being surrounded by people with large online followings. After being tasked to provide background music to play in between performances during the school's cultural festival, one of his songs accidentally gets played, much to his embarrassment. However, his classmate Otoha Hinomori comes onstage and sings his song. The performance goes viral online, and the two start a relationship.

== Characters ==
Tsunagu Kurose (黒瀬 繋玖, Kurose Tsunagu)
A high school student and composer. He uploads songs under the name Kurosuke, although he has very few followers and most criticize his singing voice. His family runs a fried chicken restaurant. His father, a band musician, was killed in an accident when he was ten years old. After befriending Otoha, the two start a music unit called Tsunagu Oto.
Otoha Hinomori (氷ノ守 音羽, Hinomori Otoha)
Tsunagu's classmate. While in school, she assumes a plain appearance, braiding her hair and wearing glasses. She is secretly the online singer Icy, Tsunagu's favorite musician. She is also secretly Hatoo, Tsunagu's sole fan. She is a piano prodigy who won many piano competitions, but her performances declined after entering high school, much to her mother's chagrin.
Seiya Amano (天野 星也, Amano Seiyuu)
Tsunagu's classmate and a guitarist.
Nene Momochi (桃地 寧々, Momochi Nene)
Tsunagu's classmate and a gyaru. She is a popular online singer with over 100,000 subscribers who goes by the name NE♡NE.
Tetsu Tamura (田村 哲, Tamura Tetsu)
Tsunagu's childhood friend and a member of the broadcasting club. He tasked Tsunagu with providing background music for the cultural festival, but accidentally plays one of Tsunagu's songs with bad vocals.
Yuzuki Kurose (黒瀬 結月, Kurose Yuzuki)
Tsunagu's younger sister, who helps out with the family restaurant. She is a popular online streamer and dancer with over 200,000 subscribers.
Misa Kamiyama (紙山 美彩, Kamiyama Misa)
A student at Tsunagu and Otoha's school. She is a popular illustrator who goes by the name Misapi (ミサぴ). She is initially hesitant to become Tsunagu Oto's illustrator after she was recently falsely accused of plagiarism, but later agrees.

== Publication ==
The series is written and illustrated by Ame Satō. It began serialization on Takeshobo's Storia Dash web service on July 5, 2024. Satō was inspired by their own experiences producing music as a student, being interested in Vocaloid and Hatsune Miku. Their theme for the series was to show how two unpopular students could shine through the power of music. They based Tsunagu on themselves, while Otoha was based on the ideal of being a "best tsundere heroine".

The first tankōbon volume was released on January 17, 2025. Four volumes have been released as of September 2026.

| No. | Release date | ISBN |
|---|---|---|
| 1 | January 17, 2025 | 978-4-8019-8550-6 |
| 2 | July 16, 2025 | 978-4-8019-8714-2 |
| 3 | January 17, 2026 | 978-4-8019-8864-4 |
| 4 | September 16, 2026 | 978-4-8019-9072-2 |
