= Mentsuyu Hitori Meshi =

Japanese manga series

- Cover of vol. 1 of the Japanese version, first released on September 18, 2018

めんつゆひとり飯
- Genre: Comedy, cooking yonkoma
- Manga
- Written by: Mizuki Setoguchi
- Published by: Takeshobo
- Imprint: Bamboo Comics
- Magazine: Manga Life (2018–2022); Essay Sasakurēru (2022–2024); Manga Life Original (2024–present)
- Original run: December 18, 2016 – present
- Volumes: 10
- Television drama
- Directed by: Hajime Senoo; Kunihiko Ōwaki (season 1); Junna Ida (season 1); Yūsuke Koroyasu (season 2)
- Produced by: Ryōichi Sasaki; Ryū Watanabe
- Written by: Erika Toyama; Sayaka Abe; Takashi Itō; Mayumi Hayashida
- Music by: Sorumayo
- Original network: BS Shochiku Tokyu
- Original run: April 1, 2023 – December 25, 2024
- Episodes: 26
- icon

Mentsuyu Hitori Meshi (Japanese: めんつゆひとり飯; lit. One Meal with Mentsuyu) is a Japanese manga series by Mizuki Setoguchi. It was serialized in the monthly seinen manga magazine Manga Life from December 18, 2016, to the magazine's final issue on July 27, 2022. After Manga Life became defunct, the series was serialized in Essay Sasakureru, where it ran until November 11, 2024, before being moved to Manga Life Original.

A live-action television drama adaptation was broadcast on BS Shochiku Tokyu for two seasons from April 1, 2023, to December 25, 2024.

== Synopsis ==
Tsuyu Mendō, an office employee, is lazy and finds it a chore to cook every day. To cut down on cooking steps, she uses mentsuyu, a condiment for noodles, as a base for the meals she prepares. The comic follows different ways of how she incorporates mentsuyu into her dishes, with recipes at the end of every chapter.

== Media ==
=== Manga ===
Mentsuyu Hitori Meshi was written and illustrated by Mizuki Setoguchi. It was serialized in the monthly seinen manga magazine Manga Life from the February 2017 released on December 18, 2016, to the September 2022 issue (the final issue of Manga Life) released on July 27, 2022. Following the end of Manga Life, Mentsuyu Hitori Meshi was moved to Essay Sasakurēru. Mentsuyu Hitori Meshi was then moved to Manga Life Original beginning with the December 2024 issue released on November 11, 2024. The chapters were later released in ten bound volumes by Takeshobo under the Bamboo Comics imprint.

In 2025, Setoguchi stated in an interview with The Television that the idea of the manga came up during a discussion with her editor about creating a cooking manga series, as it was in the midst of a boom. While thinking of ways to approach the genre differently, they started talking about the convenience of mentsuyu and based the manga on it. While drawing the manga, Setoguchi took care to not depict food being wasted or to "reject" dietary habits. The recipes in the manga were created by Setoguchi, with some modified to fit certain characters in the story. In addition, Setoguchi based some of the recipes on official recipes provided by manufacturers of mentsuyu.

No.	Japanese release date	Japanese ISBN
1	September 18, 2018	9784801963849
2	June 27, 2019	9784801966574
3	June 27, 2020	9784801969803
4	June 28, 2021	9784801973299
5	June 27, 2022	9784801976566
6	April 27, 2023	9784801980549
7	March 27, 2024	9784801982789
8	November 14, 2024	9784801984806
9	September 17, 2025	9784801987753
10	September 16, 2026	9784801990951

=== Television drama ===
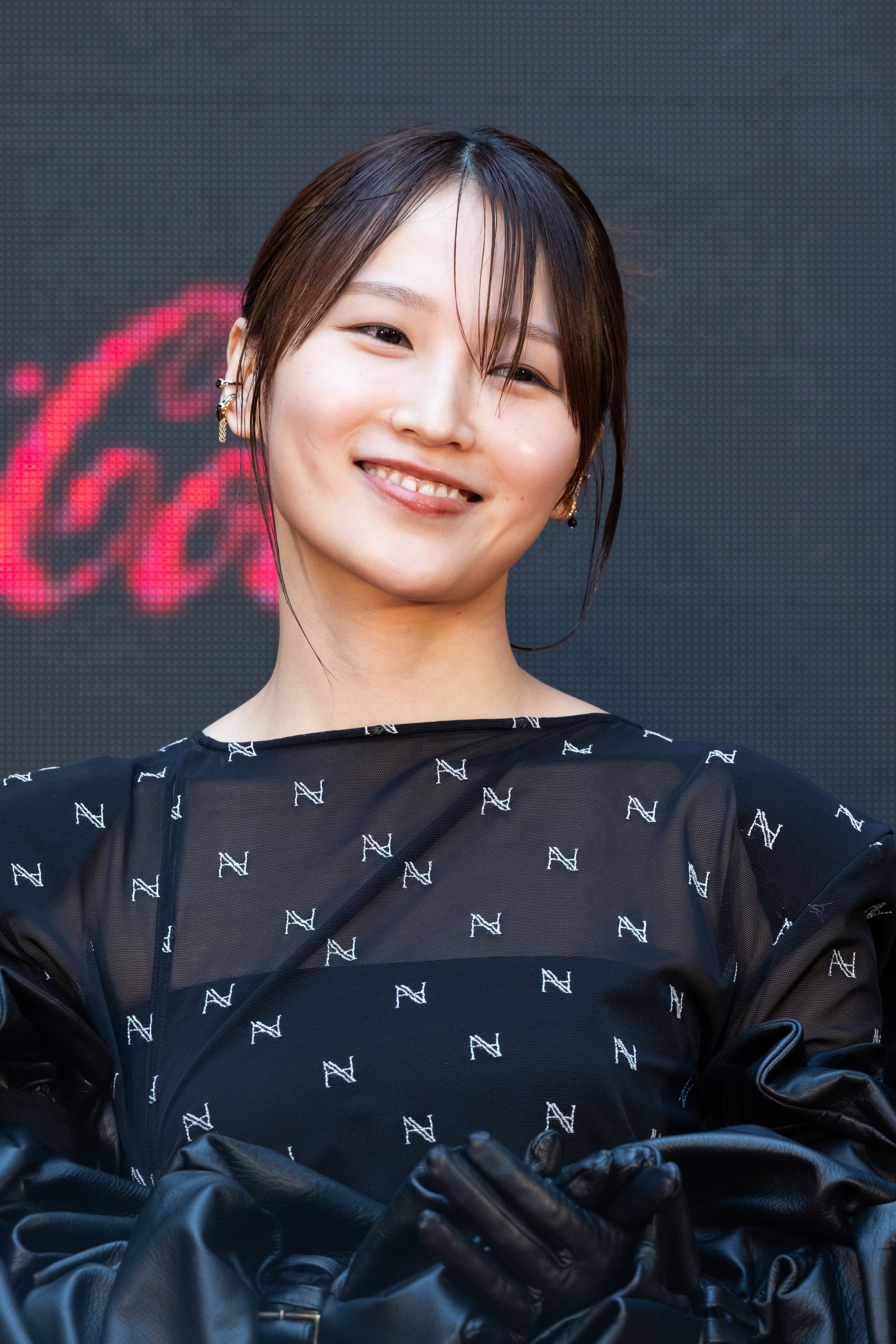
Riho Sayashi (pictured in 2024) portrayed Tsuyu in the live-action drama adaptation.

A live-action television drama adaptation of Mentsuyu Hitori Meshi was announced on March 10, 2023. It was broadcast on BS Shochiku Tokyu with a total of 13 episodes. The series is directed by Hajime Senoo, Kunihiko Ōwaki, and Junna Ida. It was produced by Ryōichi Sasaki and Ryū Watanabe. It was written by Erika Toyama, Sayaka Abe, Takashi Itō, and Mayumi Hayashida. The theme song is "As Is" by Nao Aihara.

The series stars Riho Sayashi as Tsuyu Mendō. Additional cast members include Mayu Yamaguchi as Iriko Togoshi, Masaki Kaji as Tsutomu Hokabe, and Natsumi Okamoto as Mai Shirota, and Eri Fuse as Minamo Yaranai.

A second season was announced on August 7, 2024, with Sayashi reprising her role. Nashiko Momotsuki was cast as Yuzuna Motosu, Yūtarō as Katsuo Honde, and Miwako Kakei as Sōko Mendō. Most of the supporting cast reprised their roles, with the role of Mai Shirota recast to Ui Mihara. The theme song for season 2 is "Spark!" by Shiori Kishimoto.

==== Season 1 (2023) ====
No. overall	No. in season	Title	Directed by	Written by	Original release date
1	1	"Mentsuyu Meal No. 1: Western-style Pasta"; Transliteration: "Mentsuyu Meshi Sono Ichi: Wafū Pasuta" (Japanese: めんつゆ飯 その1 和風パスタ)	Hajime Senoo	Erika Toyama	April 1, 2023
1	1	"Mentsuyu Meal No. 2: Sandwich"; Transliteration: "Mentsuyu Meshi Sono Ni: Sandoicchi" (Japanese: めんつゆ飯 その2 サンドイッチ)	Hajime Senoo	Erika Toyama	April 1, 2023
2	2	"Mentsuyu Meal No. 1: Egg Whitebait Rice Bowl"; Transliteration: "Mentsuyu Meshi Sono Ichi: Tamago Shirasu Donburi" (Japanese: めんつゆ飯 その1 卵しらす丼)	Hajime Senoo	Erika Toyama	April 8, 2023
2	2	"Mentsuyu Meal No. 2: Cheese Marinated in Mentsuyu"; Transliteration: "Mentsuyu Meshi Sono Ni: Chīzu no Mentsuyuzuke" (Japanese: めんつゆ飯 その2 チーズのめんつゆ漬け)	Hajime Senoo	Erika Toyama	April 8, 2023
3	3	"Mentsuyu Meal No. 1: Milk Soup"; Transliteration: "Mentsuyu Meshi Sono Ichi: Miruku Sūpu" (Japanese: めんつゆ飯 その1 ミルクスープ)	Kunihiko Ōwaki	Sayaka Abe	April 15, 2023
3	3	"Mentsuyu Meal No. 2: Mentsuyu Butter"; Transliteration: "Mentsuyu Meshi Sono Ni: Mentsuyu Batā" (Japanese: めんつゆ飯 その2 めんつゆバター)	Kunihiko Ōwaki	Sayaka Abe	April 15, 2023
4	4	"Mentsuyu Meal No. 1: Sweet-and-Sour Pork with Pineapples"; Transliteration: "Mentsuyu Meshi Sono Ichi: Painappuru Iri Subuta" (Japanese: めんつゆ飯 その1 パイナップル入り酢豚)	Kunihiko Ōwaki	Takashi Itō	April 22, 2023
4	4	"Mentsuyu Meal No. 2: Cheese Risotto"; Transliteration: "Mentsuyu Meshi Sono Ni: Chīzu Rizotto" (Japanese: めんつゆ飯 その2 チーズリゾット)	Kunihiko Ōwaki	Takashi Itō	April 22, 2023
5	5	"Mentsuyu Meal No. 1: Tricolored Lunch Box"; Transliteration: "Mentsuyu Meshi Sono Ichi: Sanshoku Bentō" (Japanese: めんつゆ飯 その1 三色弁当)	Hajime Senoo	Mayumi Hayashida	April 29, 2023
5	5	"Mentsuyu Meal No. 2: Curry Udon"; Transliteration: "Mentsuyu Meshi Sono Ni: Karē Udon" (Japanese: めんつゆ飯 その2 カレーうどん)	Hajime Senoo	Mayumi Hayashida	April 29, 2023
6	6	"Mentsuyu Meal No. 1: Rice Porridge with Grated Daikon"; Transliteration: "Mentsuyu Meshi Sono Ichi: Mizore Kayu" (Japanese: めんつゆ飯 その1 みぞれ粥)	Hajime Senoo	Erika Toyama	May 6, 2023
6	6	"Mentsuyu Meal No. 2: Boneless Garlic Pork Marinated in Miso"; Transliteration: "Mentsuyu Meshi Sono Ni: Futabara Nin'niku Misozuke" (Japanese: めんつゆ飯 その2 豚バラニンニク味噌漬け)	Hajime Senoo	Erika Toyama	May 6, 2023
7	7	"Mentsuyu Meal No. 1: Candied Sweet Potato"; Transliteration: "Mentsuyu Meshi Sono Ichi: Daigakuimo" (Japanese: めんつゆ飯 その1 大学芋)	Kunihiko Ōwaki	Sayaka Abe	May 13, 2023
7	7	"Mentsuyu Meal No. 2: Mentsuyu Affogato"; Transliteration: "Mentsuyu Meshi Sono Ni: Mentsuyu Afogāto" (Japanese: めんつゆ飯 その2 めんつゆアフォガート)	Kunihiko Ōwaki	Sayaka Abe	May 13, 2023
8	8	"Mentsuyu Meal No. 1: Soy Sauce Fish"; Transliteration: "Mentsuyu Meshi Sono Ichi: Nizakana" (Japanese: めんつゆ飯 その1 煮魚)	Kunihiko Ōwaki	Takashi Itō	May 20, 2023
8	8	"Mentsuyu Meal No. 2: Western-style Paella"; Transliteration: "Mentsuyu Meshi Sono Ni: Wafū Paeria" (Japanese: めんつゆ飯 その2 和風パエリア)	Kunihiko Ōwaki	Takashi Itō	May 20, 2023
9	9	"Mentsuyu Meal No. 1: Daikon Mochi"; Transliteration: "Mentsuyu Meshi Sono Ichi: Daikon Mochi" (Japanese: めんつゆ飯 その1 大根もち)	Junna Ida	Erika Toyama	May 27, 2023
9	9	"Mentsuyu Meal No. 2: Ajillo"; Transliteration: "Mentsuyu Meshi Sono Ni: Ahījo" (Japanese: めんつゆ飯 その2 アヒージョ)	Junna Ida	Erika Toyama	May 27, 2023
10	10	"Mentsuyu Meal No. 1: Zhajiangmian"; Transliteration: "Mentsuyu Meshi Sono Ichi: Jājāmen" (Japanese: めんつゆ飯 その1 ジャージャー麺)	Kunihiko Ōwaki	Sayaka Abe	June 3, 2023
10	10	"Mentsuyu Meal No. 2: Marinated Tuna Hand-mixed Sushi"; Transliteration: "Mentsuyu Meshi Sono Ni: Zuke Maguro no Tekone Zushi" (Japanese: めんつゆ飯 その2 漬けマグロの手こね寿司)	Kunihiko Ōwaki	Sayaka Abe	June 3, 2023
11	11	"Mentsuyu Meal No. 1: Summer Vegetables Mentsuyu Marinate"; Transliteration: "Mentsuyu Meshi Sono Ichi: Natsuno Yasai no Mentsuyu Marine" (Japanese: めんつゆ飯 その1 夏野菜のめんつゆマリネ)	Hajime Senoo	Sayaka Abe	June 10, 2023
11	11	"Mentsuyu Meal No. 2: Lunch for an Adult"; Transliteration: "Mentsuyu Meshi Sono Ni: Otona-sama Ranchi" (Japanese: めんつゆ飯 その2 大人様ランチ)	Hajime Senoo	Sayaka Abe	June 10, 2023
12	12	"Mentsuyu Meal No. 1: Cabbages are Crazy (Infinite Natto version)" Transliteration: "Mentsuyu Meshi Sono Ichi: Kyabetsu ga Yabai (Mugen Natto-hen)" (Japanese: めんつゆ飯 その1 キャベツがやばい〜無限納豆編〜)	Hajime Senoo	Erika Toyama	June 17, 2023
12	12	"Mentsuyu Meal No. 2: Eggplant Braised Eel Rice Bowl"; Transliteration: "Mentsuyu Meshi Sono Ni: Nasu no Kabayaki Donburi" (Japanese: めんつゆ飯 その2 ナスの蒲焼丼)	Hajime Senoo	Erika Toyama	June 17, 2023
13	13	"Mentsuyu Meal No. 1: Sesame Sauce Garlic Chicken Rice Bowl"; Transliteration: "Mentsuyu Meshi Sono Ichi: Koma Dare Gārikku Niwatori Donburi" (Japanese: めんつゆ飯 その1 胡麻ダレガーリック鶏丼)	Hajime Senoo	Erika Toyama	June 24, 2023
13	13	"Mentsuyu Meal No. 2: Spicy Mince Meat from Daikon and Chicken"; Transliteration: "Mentsuyu Meshi Sono Ni: Daikon to Niwatori no Pirikara Soboro" (Japanese: めんつゆ飯 その2 大根と鶏のピリ辛そぼろ)	Hajime Senoo	Erika Toyama	June 24, 2023

==== Season 2 (2024) ====
No. overall	No. in season	Title	Directed by	Written by	Original release date
14	1	"Mentsuyu Meal No. 1: Microwave Tamagoyaki"; Transliteration: "Mentsuyu Meshi Sono Ichi: Renchin Tamagoyaki" (Japanese: めんつゆ飯 その1 レンチン卵焼き)	Hajime Senoo	Erika Toyama	October 2, 2024
14	1	"Mentsuyu Meal No. 2: Meat Scrap Tofu Rice Bowl"; Transliteration: "Mentsuyu Meshi Sono Ni: Nikukasu Tofu Donburi" (Japanese: めんつゆ飯 その2 肉かす豆腐丼)	Hajime Senoo	Erika Toyama	October 2, 2024
15	2	"Mentsuyu Meal No. 1: Refreshing Oyakodon with Ponzu"; Transliteration: "Mentsuyu Meshi Sono Ichi: Ponzu de Sappari Oyakodon" (Japanese: めんつゆ飯 その1 ぽん酢でさっぱり親子丼)	Hajime Senoo	Erika Toyama	October 9, 2024
15	2	"Mentsuyu Meal No. 2: Squid Daikon"; Transliteration: "Mentsuyu Meshi Sono Ni: Ika Daikon" (Japanese: めんつゆ飯 その2 いか大根)	Hajime Senoo	Erika Toyama	October 9, 2024
16	3	"Mentsuyu Meal No. 1: Shrimp and Spinach Western-style Macaroni Gratin"; Transliteration: "Mentsuyu Meshi Sono Ichi: Ebi to Hōrensō no Wafū Makaroni Guratan" (Japanese: めんつゆ飯 その1 エビとほうれん草の和風マカロニグラタン)	Hajime Senoo	Sayaka Abe	October 16, 2024
16	3	"Mentsuyu Meal No. 2: Sweet Soy Sauce Mochi"; Transliteration: "Mentsuyu Meshi Sono Ni: Mitarashi Mochi" (Japanese: めんつゆ飯 その2 みたらしもち)	Hajime Senoo	Sayaka Abe	October 16, 2024
17	4	"Mentsuyu Meal No. 1: Peppers Stuffed with Meat"; Transliteration: "Mentsuyu Meshi Sono Ichi: Niku no Pīman Zume" (Japanese: めんつゆ飯 その1 肉のピーマン詰め)	Hajime Senoo	Takashi Itō	October 23, 2024
17	4	"Mentsuyu Meal No. 2: Demon King's Onigiri"; Transliteration: "Mentsuyu Meshi Sono Ni: Maō no Onigiri" (Japanese: めんつゆ飯 その2 魔王のおにぎり)	Hajime Senoo	Takashi Itō	October 23, 2024
18	5	"Mentsuyu Meal No. 1: Avocado Bean Curd"; Transliteration: "Mentsuyu Meshi Sono Ichi: Abokado Yuba" (Japanese: めんつゆ飯 その1 アボカド湯葉)	Yūsuke Koroyasu	Mayumi Hayashida	October 30, 2024
18	5	"Mentsuyu Meal No. 2: Scallop Takikomi Gohan"; Transliteration: "Mentsuyu Meshi Sono Ni: Hotate no Takikomi Gohan" (Japanese: めんつゆ飯 その2 帆立の炊き込みごはん)	Yūsuke Koroyasu	Mayumi Hayashida	October 30, 2024
19	6	"Mentsuyu Meal No. 1: Lotus Root and Beef Rice Hot Pot"; Transliteration: "Mentsuyu Meshi Sono Ichi: Renkon to Gyūniku no Donabe Gohan" (Japanese: めんつゆ飯 その1 蓮根と牛肉の土鍋ごはん)	Yūsuke Koroyasu	Takashi Itō	November 6, 2024
19	6	"Mentsuyu Meal No. 2: Mentsuyu Bitter Melon Chanpuru"; Transliteration: "Mentsuyu Meshi Sono Ni: Mentsuyu Gōya Chanpuru" (Japanese: めんつゆ飯 その2 めんつゆゴーヤチャンプル)	Yūsuke Koroyasu	Takashi Itō	November 6, 2024
20	7	"Mentsuyu Meal No. 1: Sweet Potato Honey Cream"; Transliteration: "Mentsuyu Meshi Sono Ichi: Satsuma Imo Hanī Kurīmu" (Japanese: めんつゆ飯 その1 さつまいもハニークリーム)	Yūsuke Koroyasu	Sayaka Abe	November 13, 2024
20	7	"Mentsuyu Meal No. 2: Whitebait and Sakura Shrimp Western-style Pasta"; Transliteration: "Mentsuyu Meshi Sono Ni: Shirasu to Sakura Ebi no Wafū Pasuta" (Japanese: めんつゆ飯 その2 しらすと桜エビの和風パスタ)	Yūsuke Koroyasu	Sayaka Abe	November 13, 2024
21	8	"Mentsuyu Meal No. 1: Sloppy Hot Pot"; Transliteration: "Mentsuyu Meshi Sono Ichi: Zubora Nabe" (Japanese: めんつゆ飯 その1 ズボラ鍋)	Yūsuke Koroyasu	Erika Toyama	November 20, 2024
21	8	"Mentsuyu Meal No. 2: Imitation Crab Omelette on Rice"; Transliteration: "Mentsuyu Meshi Sono Ni: Kanikama Tenshinhan" (Japanese: めんつゆ飯 その2 カニカマ天津飯)	Yūsuke Koroyasu	Erika Toyama	November 20, 2024
22	9	"Mentsuyu Meal No. 1: Corn and Mayonnaise Salad with Okra and Pounded Fish Cake"; Transliteration: "Mentsuyu Meshi Sono Ichi: Okura to Hanpen no Kōn Mayo Sarada" (Japanese: めんつゆ飯 その1 オクラとはんぺんのコーンマヨサラダ)	Yūsuke Koroyasu	Erika Toyama	November 27, 2024
22	9	"Mentsuyu Meal No. 2: Oyster Mentsuyu Hot Pot with Thinly Sliced Pork and Mushrooms"; Transliteration: "Mentsuyu Meshi Sono Ni: Butakoma to Kinoko no Oisutā Mentsuyu Nabe" (Japanese: めんつゆ飯 その2 豚こまときのこのオイスターめんつゆ鍋)	Yūsuke Koroyasu	Erika Toyama	November 27, 2024
23	10	"Mentsuyu Meal No. 1: Microwave-Baked Thin-Sliced Mochi"; Transliteration: "Mentsuyu Meshi Sono Ichi: Renchin Okaki" (Japanese: めんつゆ飯 その1 レンチンおかき)	Yūsuke Koroyasu	Erika Toyama	December 4, 2024
23	10	"Mentsuyu Meal No. 2: White Cod Roe"; Transliteration: "Mentsuyu Meshi Sono Ni: Shira Tarako" (Japanese: めんつゆ飯 その2 しらたらこ)	Yūsuke Koroyasu	Erika Toyama	December 4, 2024
24	11	"Mentsuyu Meal No. 1: Original Method Clear Broth Soup"; Transliteration: "Mentsuyu Meshi Sono Ichi: Honkakuppoi Osuimono" (Japanese: めんつゆ飯 その1 本格っぽいお吸い物)	Yūsuke Koroyasu	Erika Toyama	December 11, 2024
24	11	"Mentsuyu Meal No. 2: Fried Tofu Egg Stew Rice Bowl with Oden"; Transliteration: "Mentsuyu Meshi Sono Ni: Oden no Atsuage Tamagotoji Donburi" (Japanese: めんつゆ飯 その2 おでんの厚揚げ卵とじ丼)	Yūsuke Koroyasu	Erika Toyama	December 11, 2024
25	12	"Mentsuyu Meal No. 1: Super Easy Katsudon"; Transliteration: "Mentsuyu Meshi Sono Ichi: Chō Kantan Katsudon" (Japanese: めんつゆ飯 その1 超簡単カツ丼)	Hajime Senoo	Erika Toyama	December 18, 2024
25	12	"Mentsuyu Meal No. 2: Western-style Mochi Pizza"; Transliteration: "Mentsuyu Meshi Sono Ni: Wafū Mochi Piza" (Japanese: めんつゆ飯 その2 和風餅ピザ)	Hajime Senoo	Erika Toyama	December 18, 2024
26	13	"Mentsuyu Meal No. 1: Chicken Meatball with Lotus Root"; Transliteration: "Mentsuyu Meshi Sono Ichi: Renkon Iri Niwatori Tsukune" (Japanese: めんつゆ飯 その1 蓮根入り鶏つくね)	Hajime Senoo	Erika Toyama	December 25, 2024
26	13	"Mentsuyu Meal No. 2: Concrete Hot Pot"; Transliteration: "Mentsuyu Meshi Sono Ni: Konkuri Nabe" (Japanese: めんつゆ飯 その2 コンクリ鍋)	Hajime Senoo	Erika Toyama	December 25, 2024

== Reception ==
Mentsuyu Hitori Meshi was one of the highest-selling manga during its first week release at comics store Comic Zin in Akihabara. Volume 6 was the best-selling manga at Comic Zin from April 24 to April 30, 2023.
