= Furiten-kun =

Japanese manga series

フリテンくん
- Manga
- Written by: Masashi Ueda
- Published by: Takeshobo
- Magazine: Kindai Mahjong; Kindai Mahjong Original; Gamble Punch
- Original run: 1980 – 1984
- Anime film
- Directed by: Takashi Sugiyama
- Produced by: Tokumaro Saijo
- Written by: Haruya Yamazaki; Noboru Shiroyama; Taku Sugiyama; Tsunehisa Itō
- Music by: Tachio Akano
- Studio: Oh! Production
- Released: April 11, 1981
- Runtime: 78 minutes
- Manga
- Published by: Takeshobo
- Magazine: Manga Life
- Original run: November 1984 – 1994
- Volumes: 19
- Manga

Osusume Furiten-kun
- Written by: Masashi Ueda
- Published by: Takeshobo
- Magazine: Manga Life
- Original run: 1991 – 1992
- Volumes: 8
- Manga
- Written by: Masashi Ueda
- Published by: Takeshobo
- Magazine: Manga Life
- Original run: January 2001 – February 2002
- Manga

Shin Furiten-kun
- Written by: Masashi Ueda
- Published by: Takeshobo
- Magazine: Manga Life
- Original run: March 2002 – July 2026
- Volumes: 10

Furiten-kun (フリテンくん) is a yonkoma manga series by Masashi Ueda which has been serialized in several magazine. In the early 1980s, the manga was published simultaneously in Takeshobo's Kindai Mahjong, Kindai Mahjong Original, and Gamble Punch. It was then published in Manga Life magazine from November 1984 (in the first issue of the magazine) to 1994. The series was started again in January 2001 and is currently running in Manga Life. The title of the series was changed to Shin Furiten-kun (新フリテンくん) in March 2002. The manga ended on July 10, 2026. The manga was adapted into a feature film and an OVA in the early 1980s.

Several pachinko systems have been released which feature Furiten-kun as the theme. It won the 28th Bungeishunjū Manga Award along with Ueda's Kariage-kun in 1982.

== Anime film ==
=== Staff ===
- Director: Taku Sugiyama
- Producers: Seishi Nishino, Satoshi Sakai
- Executive producer: Katsuo Seijō
- Original story: Masashi Ueda
- Screenplay: Noboru Shiroyama, Tsunehisa Itō, Haruya Yamazaki, Taku Sugiyama

=== Cast ===
- Furiten-kun: Haruo Chikada
