= Doki Doki School Hours =

Japanese four-panel manga series

せんせいのお時間 (Sensei no Ojikan)
- Genre: Comedy, slice of life
- Manga
- Written by: Tamami Momose
- Published by: Takeshobo
- Magazine: Manga Life; Manga Life Original; Manga Life Momo
- Original run: February 1997 – April 2013
- Volumes: 12
- Anime television series
- Directed by: Yoshiaki Iwasaki
- Music by: Yoshihisa Hirano
- Studio: J.C.Staff
- Licensed by: US: Geneon Entertainment
- Original network: TV Tokyo
- Original run: April 4, 2004 – June 27, 2004
- Episodes: 13
- Original video animation
- Directed by: Yoshiaki Iwasaki
- Music by: Yoshihisa Hirano
- Studio: J.C.Staff
- Licensed by: US: Geneon Entertainment
- Released: August 4, 2004 – February 2, 2005
- Episodes: 7

Doki Doki School Hours (せんせいのお時間, Sensei no Ojikan; "Teacher's Time") is a Japanese four-panel manga series by Tamami Momose. The manga was serialized in Manga Life and published by Takeshobo from 1997 to 2013.

An anime television series adaptation was animated by J.C.Staff and aired on TV Tokyo from April 4 to June 27, 2004. An OVA series, titled Sensei no Ojikan Gold (せんせいのお時間 ご～るど), was also animated by J.C.Staff and continued from where the TV series left off. These episodes were released onto the DVDs of the TV series, one episode for each DVD. Both the TV series and OVA were dubbed into English by Ocean Productions using their Blue Water Studios and have been licensed for release in North America by Geneon Entertainment, but the OVA was folded onto the TV series and released together as simply Doki Doki School Hours. Thus, for the release in that region, the 14th episode is actually the first episode of the OVA and so on.

The series is centered on 27-year-old homeroom teacher Mika Suzuki (who only looks about half her age) and the eccentric and colorful students of her class. The anime, coming two years after J.C.Staff had success with Azumanga Daioh, inherits a lot stylistically from that series, but the original manga predates Azumanga Daioh by two years. Additionally, before the recent anime incarnation, the manga spawned a series of drama CDs.

== Plot ==
A very short 27-year-old teacher has an interesting time trying to teach her class and she has to deal with the eccentricities of her students as they present themselves over the school year.

== Characters ==
Mika Suzuki (鈴木みか, Suzuki Mika), also known as "Mika-sensei"
Voiced by: Omi Minami (Japanese); Angie Beers (English)
The 27-year old homeroom teacher of Class 2A who is unusually short, she is usually addressed, as given the nickname "Mika-sensei". Her short stature and generally "cute" appearance causes people to think her more childish than she is. Even so, she is not especially mature, still lives with her parents and dreads "measuring day". Mika also has a tendency to cry when things do not go her way.

Minako "Tommy" Tominaga (富永美奈子, Tominaga Minako)
Voiced by: Kana Ueda (Japanese); Carol-Anne Day (English)
A brutally honest student who belongs to the cooking club, she is often shown moaning about being surrounded by idiots in her class, or telling people off. She loves slasher films.

Akane Kobayashi (小林あかね, Kobayashi Akane)
Voiced by: Tomoko Kawakami (Japanese); Mariette Sluyter (English)
A girl who likes to sleep in class but outside of school she holds a part-time job as she loves to make money. She has also shown great concern about her appearance and weight, causing her to put herself on crash diets. She is very ditzy sometimes, like when she walked into the classroom and Anthony (an American exchange student) said "Hello!" in English: she came to the instant conclusion she had woken up in America.

Shizuka Nagare (流静, Nagare Shizuka), also known as "Chairman (Iincho)"
Voiced by: Ikue Ohtani (Japanese); Leda Davies (English)
The Class President of Class 2A, she wanted to be class president due to her favorite pop star stating that he liked class presidents: she decided to be class president for the rest of her life. She is highly intelligent and friendly, but is seem at times being brutal to people, especially when they somehow insult her idol.

Rio Kitagawa (北川理央, Kitagawa Rio)
Voiced by: Wakana Yamazaki (Japanese); Cheryl McMaster (English)
A tall and very pretty girl who constantly teases Mika-sensei, as she finds her various moods cute. She is a lesbian and has stated on several occasion that she loves small girls, thus making it no surprise that she has a huge (and slightly sadistic) crush on Mika-sensei. She is constantly flirting with her, which often borders on molestation. She has an excellent body, which Kobayashi is jealous of, though she is fairly modest about it. She also does well academically, though she is not above failing a test on purpose if it means she will get to spend time with Mika-sensei.

Kenta Suetake (末武健太, Suetake Kenta)
Voiced by: Kappei Yamaguchi (Japanese); Jeffrey Watson (English)
The athlete, Suetake knows nothing other than sports-related information. He is rather dumb and fails most things that don't involve sports, but he is also kind and good-natured. Kudo, who likes him, will often tutor him.

Yuichi Kudo (工藤雄一, Kudō Yūichi)
Voiced by: Yuji Ueda (Japanese); Scott Roberts (English)
A male honor student who is gay and in love with Suetake, he has poor self-control and is known as "the nosebleed king". Though Suetake is completely oblivious to Kudo's affections, everyone else is aware of them, and they are constantly rolling their eyes over his actions (which is very similar to how they react to Kitagawa's love for Mika, the only difference being that Mika is aware of Kitagawa's feelings, but can do little to stop her advances). He is seen having fantasies about Suetake, and not much else. A running gag is he will constantally have nose bleeds (in Japan, it is a sign of sexual arousal, especially in young men) brought on by Suetake's innocent comments and actions to the point of passing out and requiring medical attention.

Jyoji Seki (関譲治, Seki Jōji)
Voiced by: Kishô Taniyama (Japanese); Sean Broadhurst (English)
A student who used to love beautiful girls and turned into a narcissist, to the point that he usually goes to school in makeup. He goes on and on about how lovely a girl can be, if she uses the right products. Outside school, he has been seen in skirts and even a full ladies' kimono. Despite the two of them often stating that they dislike each other, he seems to have a good relationship with Kobayashi.

Takumi "Watabe" Watanabe (渡部匠, Watanabe Takumi)
Voiced by: Kousuke Okano (Japanese); Ryan Stockert (English)
The head (and, originally, sole member) of the school's manga club, he has great artistic ability, but he is only ever seen drawing stereotypical bishōjo-type characters, and his obsession tends to get a little on the creepy side. He dislikes drawing men, and it is somewhat implied that he is not very good at doing so. Mika-sensei has occasionally shown interest in his work. Mika has often been the subject of his work, which has seems to have earned him a somewhat friendship with Kitakawa for his art of her.

Gen Nakamura (中村元, Nakamura Gen), also known as "Old Man (Oyaji)"
Voiced by: Mitsuo Iwata (Japanese); Lucas Gilbertson (English)
The 17-year-old student carries himself in a stereotypically "40-year-old" manner, and therefore is nicknamed "Old Man". Later in the series, it is hinted he has a crush on Iincho, and is occasionally mistaken for a pervert.

Linda Matsumoto (松本リンダ, Matsumoto Rinda)
Voiced by: Kumiko Watanabe (Japanese); Maizun Jayoussi (English)
Okitsu High School's Doctor and Mika's best friend on the faculty.

Chinatsu Nakayama (中山千夏, Nakayama Chinatsu)
Voiced by: Kaori Shimizu (Japanese); Caitlynne Medrek (English)
A member of Takumi Watanabe's manga club who, ironically, is terrible at drawing manga. She idolises and has a large crush on Takumi. He seems to know, but manages to throw her off.

Anthony M. Chamberlain (アンソニー・M・チェンバレン)
Voiced by: Showtaro Morikubo (Japanese); Jordan Schartner (English)
A transfer student who is studying abroad from America, he is fluent in Japanese because he is an otaku.

== Episode list ==
1. Here Comes Class 2A Of Okitsu High School
2. Measuring and Throwing and Hitting
3. Swimsuits and Exams! Something Drops!
4. Mika-Sensei's Summer Story
5. Summer Ends and Artistic Autumn Arrives
6. The Culture Festival Is The Festival of Culture
7. Santa Girl and New Years' Fun
8. Winter Has Come and Spring Is Around The Corner
9. The Tearful Graduation Ceremony
10. The Kyoto Field Trip Incident of Love and Hate!
11. Sunshine After Rain, Partially Student Teacher
12. Frightening experiences, Summer Activities
13. Summer in Shonan: The Don't Say Goodbye Episode
14. The Exchange Student and Okitsu, The Dark City
15. Sports Festival Special
16. The Big Family and The Elusive Pork Ramen, Big Sister Mika Is Running Away
17. Beast Buster Ekaterina Nagare A.K.A. Iincho
18. SF Magical Period Drama Doki Doki Version: The Okitsu Millennium Battle!
19. The Culture Festival Operation
20. The Small One Departs Okitsu

== Reception ==
Tim Jones of THEM Anime Reviews said the series is "quite an interesting series upon first glance", with three of the main characters coming out of nowhere, doing a bad job of introducing characters unlike a series like Azumanga Daioh, meaning that they embody stereotypes. He also criticized Mika being the "target of sexual advances of one of her students", a student named Kitakawa who is "a lesbian lolicon lover", a character he called one of the most shallow, and annoying character he had ever "seen in the history of animation". He also noted that there is a gay man who only thinks of his male crush, "sometimes to the point of getting nosebleeds" and said his love interest had one of the most annoying voices, and added that the series has problems when "a guy who draws half-naked anime girls is one of the best characters". He further called the animation "horrible" and doesn't understand how it ran for 20 episodes.

Carlos Santos of Anime News Network said that the anime is "a cute diversion that will leave you mildly happy rather than annoyed or offended" and that the series has "shadows of hilarity". He also said that the series is "lighthearted", and called the series "far from perfect". He concluded that there are "some genuinely cute and funny moments but said that it has the "same jokes, same structure" which gets boring.
