= Poyopoyo Kansatsu Nikki =

Japanese manga series

- Promo image for TV Tokyo anime

ポヨポヨ観察日記
- Genre: Slice of life
- Manga
- Written by: Rū Tatsuki
- Published by: Takeshobo
- Magazine: Manga Life Momo; Manga Life
- Original run: February 1, 2004 – April 2016
- Volumes: 15
- Anime television series
- Directed by: Akitaro Daichi
- Studio: Studio Deen
- Original network: TV Tokyo
- Original run: January 8, 2012 – December 30, 2012
- Episodes: 52
- Video game
- Publisher: IE Institute
- Genre: Virtual pet
- Platform: Nintendo 3DS
- Released: April 5, 2012

Poyopoyo Kansatsu Nikki (ポヨポヨ観察日記, Poyopoyo Observation Diary) is a Japanese manga series created by Rū Tatsuki about a spherical cat named Poyo and the family that adopts him. It was adapted into an anime television series in January 2012. The anime is available subtitled in English on Crunchyroll. A video game based on the series in which players raise Poyo was released in April 2012 for the Nintendo 3DS.

== Plot ==
Poyopoyo revolves around a spherical orange cat named Poyo, and the family that adopts him. The slice of life stories only have very mild continuity between them, and can be taken as stand-alone episodes. Episodes often deal with regular day-to-day interactions between family members, occasionally showing how family members celebrate holidays or deal with everyday inconveniences like rainstorms. At first, younger brother Hide dislikes Poyo, but as the stories continue, Hide has grown somewhat attached to the family pet.

== Characters ==
- Poyo Satou (Ikue Otani) is orange, round cat and main character of the series.
- Moe Satou (Suzuko Mimori) is a 22-year-old woman who found Poyo in the street when she was drunk. She is friendly and very careless.
- Hide Satou (Hidekazu Ichinose) is Moe's younger brother and has a hard time getting along with Poyo. He is 17 and attends high school.
- Shigeru Satou (Akira Kamiya) is the father of Moe and Hide, and is a strong and intimidating man.
