= Sparrow's Hotel =

Japanese manga and anime series

- Cover of the first manga volume featuring main character, Sayuri Satō.

スパロウズホテル (Suparouzu Hoteru)
- Genre: Comedy
- Manga
- Written by: Yuka Santō
- Published by: Takeshobo
- Magazine: Manga Life
- Original run: 2008 – 2014
- Volumes: 4
- Manga

Sparrow's Hotel ANNEX
- Written by: Yuka Santō
- Published by: Takeshobo
- Magazine: Manga Life Storia
- Original run: 2014 – present
- Volumes: 13
- Anime television series
- Directed by: Tetsuji Nakamura (ep.1 - ep.6); Itsuki Imazaki (ep.7 - ep.12)
- Studio: Hotline
- Licensed by: NA: Crunchyroll
- Original network: AT-X, KBS, TV Saitama
- Original run: April 9, 2013 – June 25, 2013
- Episodes: 12
- Original video animation
- Directed by: Itsuki Imazaki
- Studio: Hotline
- Released: September 4, 2013
- Runtime: 3 minutes

Sparrow's Hotel (Japanese: スパロウズホテル, Hepburn: Suparouzu Hoteru) is a yonkoma manga series written and illustrated by Yuka Santō. An anime adaptation by Hotline aired between April 9 to June 25, 2013, on AT-X and was streamed with English subtitles by Crunchyroll.

Sparrow's Hotel ended in 2014 and was followed by a sequel called Sparrow's Hotel ANNEX.

== Plot ==
Sparrow's Hotel follows the daily activities of Sayuri Satō, Tamaki Shiokawa and Misono as they manage the Sparrow's Hotel along with the many different types of people and misadventures they encounter along the way.

== Characters ==
Sayuri Satō (佐藤 小百合, Satō Sayuri)
Voiced by: Minori Chihara
Main protagonist. She is very attractive causing males to flock to her. She is somewhat dim-witted and possesses ninja-like abilities, such as carrying around hidden kunai, adept fighting skills and talks about her "training."
Tamaki Shiokawa (塩川 環, Shiokawa Tamaki)
Voiced by: Haruka Nagashima
Manager of the Sparrow's Hotel.
Misono (御園, Misono)
Voiced by: Daisuke Kishio
The hotel's bell boy.
Shiokawa (塩川)
Voiced by: Daisuke Ono
The Business Manager of Sparrow's Hotel and older brother of Tamaki. He has a sister complex.
Yū Kojō (古城 ゆう, Kojō Yū)
Voiced by: Asuka Yūki
A hotel inspector that is not very good at her job. She later surfaces as a worker of the hotel.
Billy the XO (ビリー・ザ・XO, Birī za XO)
Voiced by: Tsuyoshi Koyama
A rival fighter of Sayuri.
Sakai (酒井)
Voiced by: Shuta Morishima
A man with a crush on Sayuri.

== Media ==
=== Volume list ===
No.	Japanese release date	Japanese ISBN
1	May 27, 2010	978-4-8124-7277-4
2	October 27, 2011	978-4-8124-7675-8
3	April 17, 2013	978-4-8124-8147-9
4	March 27, 2014	978-4-8124-8538-5
5	November 27, 2015	9784801954052
6	June 27, 2017	9784801959712
7	July 27, 2018	9784801963306
8	December 27, 2018	9784801964792
9	May 27, 2020	9784801969476
10	January 27, 2021	9784801971936
11	July 27, 2021	9784801973824
12	June 27, 2022	9784801976580
13	March 16, 2023	9784801979918

=== Anime ===
Sparrow's Hotel is produced by Hotline and Dream Creation. It is directed by Tetsuji Nakamura with character designs by Daisuke Kusakari. The anime is formatted as a series of shorts, with each episode being only a few minutes in length. The series aired on AT-X between April 9 and June 25, 2013. Additionally it aired on KBS and TV Saitama and was streamed online by Niconico and Rakuten ShowTime, and with English subtitles by Crunchyroll. The song "Welcome to Sparrow's Hotel" by Minori Chihara and Haruka Nagashima is used as an opening theme for the first 6 episodes and as an ending theme for the rest. The entire 12-episode series was released on DVD on September 4, 2013. The DVD included reanimated versions of the first 6 episodes in addition to a 13th OVA episode.

==== Episode list ====
No.	Title	Original release date
1	"The Invincible Front Desk Lady" "Muteki no Furonto Redī" (無敵のフロントレディー)	April 9, 2013
Some men in front of a neighboring bar spot the gorgeous Sayuri Satō and follow her to the Sparrow's Hotel. Here, Sayuri helps keep the hotel running by handling day to day activities such as helping guests check in/out. The manager, Tamaki Shiokawa attempts to show Sayuri how to make the hotel beds properly although Sayuri, unable to control herself, just jumps on it once it's made. Just then, Sayuri is tasked by Tamaki to help a drunk guest sober up. Some time later, Tamaki tells Sayuri how the hotel got its name all the while disappointing would-be suitors. Sayuri is later caught with two kunai by the hotel's front desk agent Misono before Tamaki tells her to use force to stop some drunkards from kicking the hotel's sign.
2	"Large Breasts and Assassination" "Kyonyū to Ansatsu" (巨乳と暗殺)	April 16, 2013
Tamaki sweeps the front of the hotel while the nearby bar's drunkards have a scuffle. As Sayuri protects Tamaki from a random flying bucket, she rips her skirt. Misono again sees the kunai, prompting him to ask Tamaki about her. A flashback shows that when Sayuri filled out her job application, she left "work experience" blank, claiming it was confidential but that her strong points were "large breasts and assassination." Afterwards Misono concludes that Sayuri acts like the hotel's bouncer, by getting rid of undesirables. Soon Tamaki's brother, the hotel's Business Manager - Shiokawa, makes an appearance. After seeing Sayuri take down the random drunkards in front of the hotel, he leaves her to protect Tamaki.
3	"Cherry Blossom Viewing Rocks!" "Ohanami Saikō!" (お花見サイコー!)	April 23, 2013
The cherry blossoms are in bloom and Tamaki has Sayuri bring in some potted cherry blossoms to decorate the hotel, although it ends up creating a mess as the petals continually drop. Sayuri then goes to knock out a drunkard and offers to save the hotel staff a decent viewing spot in the park to watch the cherry blossoms, which she does by using camouflage. At the park, everyone eventually gets drunk, while two men realize they are actually sober after Sayuri opens some turmeric drinks using only her thumbs. Afterwards Tamaki has Sayuri entertain them with knife throwing at apple targets held by a petrified Misono.
4	"Kojou "S" On the Scene" "Kojō S Sanjō" (古城S参上)	April 30, 2013
Soliciting club scouts approach a girl about to enter the hotel but are stopped by Sayuri. The girl turns out to be an undercover spy for the Sparrow's Hotel Group, Yu Kojou. She checks in at the hotel and starts covertly checking its standards such as cleanliness and staff codes of conduct. Sayuri suspects that Yu is a spy and informs Tamaki. As Yu heads out for a bit, she runs into Sakai and is surprised when he recognizes her. Later as she checks out of the hotel, Yu is once again surprised that Sayuri figured out her true agenda.
5	"Golden Week!" "Gōruden na Week!" (ゴールデンなWeek!)	May 7, 2013
During Golden Week the hotel gets extremely busy. As guests start a disturbance on the second floor, Tamaki has Sayuri take care of it and Misono realizes that if Tamaki's order is taken out of context, she basically ordered a "hit." Misono helps fellow college students check in and sulks on not being recognized much to Tamaki's pity. More guests arrive but since the hotel is all booked Tamaki sends Sayuri up with an entire extra bed to the guests' shock. As everyone becomes exhausted at the end of Golden Week, Sayuri keeps going full throttle to which Tamaki thought on the source of Sayuri's energy leaves Misono to label that kind of thinking as sexual harassment. Later, Sayuri protects Tamaki from a nearby club scout.
6	"Both My Hotel and My Wallet Are in a Slump" "Se to Hara wa Futori Yasui" (背と腹は・・太りやすい)	May 14, 2013
Since Golden Week went by, the hotel barely gets any new business and as a result Tamaki starts compulsively shopping. Sayuri does the same but she buys so much sports equipment that she says the floor of her apartment fell through. Tamaki tries to get Misono to provoke her and thus cheer her up, but he refuses, fearing for his life. A group of drunkards make a ruckus behind the hotel and Tamaki has Sayuri take care of them, which Misono likens to a wild animal tamer. With a week left until payday, Tamaki and Shiokawa go out to eat much to his delight, and upon returning, realizes she gained weight from the meal when trying to fasten her skirt much to her disdain.
7	"The New Sparrow's Hotel Has Begun" "Shin Suparouzu Hoteru Hajimemashita" (新スパロウズホテルはじめました)	May 21, 2013
Remodeling of a bathroom and sauna commences at Sparrow's Hotel, but is completed quickly due to the strength of construction worker, Billy the XO. Before he leaves, Billy is confronted by Sayuri and acknowledges her strength as the source for drawing strong people to Sparrow's Hotel. Afterwards, a man by the name of Sakai fantasizes about using a deceptive means to stay at Sparrow's Hotel in order to try and win over Sayuri, although is devastated when he sees the sign that the Hotel is closed for the remodeling.
8	"The Infiltrator Returns" "Sennyūsha, Sairai." (潜入者、再来。)	May 28, 2013
Yu gets transferred to the Business Department and has a meeting with Shiokawa. Later that day, Yu then shows up at the Sparrow's Hotel to let them know of her new position and is surprised that they were able to see through her disguise from her last visit. As Yu, starts sulking, Sayuri pulls out a kunai and moves to attack Yu because of her ninja training before she is stopped by Tamaki. Just then, Tamaki's brother shows up and asks that Yu give him her report over dinner of whether any "undesirable men are going after Tamaki", which causes her to label him a siscon. As they head to dinner, Yu is disgusted by Shiokawa's closeness to Tamaki, although he doesn't seem to understand what the problem is.
9	"Sudden Comic Event" "Komikku Ibento wa Totsuzen ni" (コミックイベントは突然に)	June 4, 2013
A nearby manga fair draws huge crowds of cosplayers and otaku to Sparrow's Hotel. As Tamaki tries to understand why adults would cosplay, Misono explains the reason in a rather depressing manner. Afterwards, a couple girls check into the hotel and describe Misono in their own "in-universe style" phrases which he doesn't understand, but suspects that he may have been insulted. Sometime later, Sayuri grows weary of a cosplayer who silently approaches hear with a fake sword. Billy then enters the hotel to check if any of the cosplayers were actual fighters, realizing they're all fake except Sayuri. The two then proceed to fight before Sayuri is stopped by Tamaki.
10	"The Day The Storms Arise" "Arashi Fuku Hi ni" (嵐吹く日に)	June 11, 2013
A sudden typhoon causes all of the reservations at Sparrow's Hotel to be cancelled, although the hotel soon becomes flooded with people stranded by the storm and hence becomes completely booked once again. Since there is nothing left to do, Tamaki excites herself at the prospect of lounging on the hotel's services while they wait out the storm. Later, a rowdy guest causes a stir after becoming intoxicated and starts demanding his money back. Tamaki sends Sayuri to deal with the situation to which she knocks the man out, leaving him asleep in his room until he wakes up the next morning feeling refreshed after the storm.
11	"Satou-san is Off Today" "Satō-san wa Oyasumi desu" (佐藤さんはお休みです)	June 18, 2013
Sayuri continues defend the hotel against the local ruffians. Misono shows concern over Sayuri's troubled look although Tamaki shows up his naivety when explaining that Sayuri only has that look because she has to hold back when fighting. The next day, Sakai is devastated when Sayuri doesn't show up for work. In her absence, Yu volunteers to replace Sayuri for the day but rejects immediately when a random object flies past her face. Afterwards, the group have different interpretations on what Sayuri is up to. The next day, it turns out Sayuri had been sick with the flu, and tried telling them with a smoke signal, but had to "shake off" some interference, leaving the group to wonder what actually happened.
12	"Wish Upon a Star" "Hoshi ni Negau" (星に願う)	June 25, 2013
Shiokawa looks at a bamboo tree decorated with the wishes of people and ponders on the dark nature of humanity. He happily rejoices at Tamaki's wish to not be related, which he misinterprets as the only barrier to their marriage, much to Tamaki's irritation. On the rooftop, Yu invites Sayuri to write a wish, but Sayuri claims that her wish had already come true. As Yu, thinks out loud on what Sayuri means, Sayuri compliments Yu's unrestrained nature causing her to crumple her tanzaku (短冊, tanzaku) since she doesn't have to change herself. Afterwards, as Sayuri leaps off the roof, Misono and Yu remark that Sayuri is indeed strange but interesting, and herself along with Billy and the rest help the make hotel a success.
OVA	"It's Summer! Time for the Beach! Swimsuit Episode!@ There's even some Bi**** Stuff☆" "Natsuda! Umida yo! Mizugi Kai! Bi○-mo Aru Yo~tsu☆"夏だ!海だよ!水着回!! ビ○―もあるよっ☆	September 4, 2013
