= Monologue Woven For You =

Japanese manga series

- First tankōbon volume cover

君に紡ぐ傍白 (Kimi ni Tsumugu Bouhaku)
- Genre: Romance, Yuri
- Manga
- Written by: Syu Yasaka
- Published by: Takeshobo
- English publisher: NA: Seven Seas Entertainment
- Magazine: Manga Life Storia Dash
- Original run: March 6, 2020 – September 3, 2021
- Volumes: 3

Monologue Woven For You (Japanese: 君に紡ぐ傍白, Hepburn: Kimi ni Tsumugu Bouhaku) is a Japanese yuri manga written and illustrated by Syu Yasaka. It was serialized on Takeshobo's Manga Life Storia Dash website between March 2020 and September 2021. It was collected into three tankōbon volumes. The series was licensed for an English-language release by Seven Seas Entertainment in 2021.

== Synopsis ==
Tachibana Haruka, a university student, has abandons her theater aspirations, while Hayama Nao pursues her dream of acting head-on. As the two cross paths a romance is sparked between despite their differing feelings toward a career in theater.

== Publication ==
Written and illustrated by Syu Yasaka, Monologue Woven For You was serialized on Takeshobo's Manga Life Storia Dash website from March 6, 2020, to September 3, 2021, and was collected into three tankōbon volumes.

The series is licensed for an English release in North America by Seven Seas Entertainment.

No.	Original release date	Original ISBN	English release date	English ISBN
1	October 30, 2020	978-4801971011	February 22, 2022	978-1-64827-796-2
2	March 30, 2021	978-4801972490	June 7, 2022	978-1-63858-292-2
3	October 29, 2021	978-4801974531	February 14, 2023	978-1-63858-836-8

== Reception ==
Erica Friedman of Yuricon gave the first volume a 7 out of 10, noting that the art was not to her taste. "I'd vastly prefer this story if it were graced with an art style that captured the actual ages of the characters", however still enjoying the story itself, commenting that "the energy of it is sincere, and I appreciate that the narrative eschewed additional complication." Nicki Bauman was more negative towards the series, writing in her review of the second volume that "the series would be better off had it leaned wholly into overly saturated and sweet fluff. At least that is fun to read. But, in trying to have its cake and eat it too, Monologue Woven for You has failed to stand out and appears set to coast along till the curtain falls on its mediocrity."

== See also ==
- How Do I Turn My Best Friend Into My Girlfriend?, another manga series by the same author
