= How Do I Turn My Best Friend Into My Girlfriend? =

Japanese manga series

- First tankōbon volume cover

どうしたら幼馴染の彼女になれますか！？ (Dōshitara Osananajimi no Kanojo ni Naremasu ka!?)
- Genre: Romantic comedy; Yuri
- Manga
- Written by: Syu Yasaka
- Published by: Takeshobo
- English publisher: NA: Seven Seas Entertainment
- Imprint: Bamboo Comics
- Magazine: Storia Dash
- Original run: April 1, 2022 – December 27, 2024
- Volumes: 5

How Do I Turn My Best Friend Into My Girlfriend? (どうしたら幼馴染の彼女になれますか！？, Dōshitara Osananajimi no Kanojo ni Naremasu ka!?) is a Japanese yuri manga series written and illustrated by Syu Yasaka. It was serialized on Takeshobo's Storia Dash manga website from April 2022 to December 2024.

== Plot ==
After a boy at school confesses his feelings to Yuzu, her close childhood friend Minami realizes that her feelings for Yuzu are romantic as well, and tries to become her girlfriend.

== Publication ==
Written and illustrated by Syu Yasaka, How Do I Turn My Best Friend Into My Girlfriend? was serialized on Takeshobo's Storia Dash manga website from April 1, 2022, to December 27, 2024. The series' chapters were collected in five tankōbon volumes from October 17, 2022, to February 17, 2025. The series is licensed in English by Seven Seas Entertainment.

No.	Original release date	Original ISBN	North American release date	North American ISBN
1	October 17, 2022	978-4-8019-7869-0	March 19, 2024	979-8-88843-618-9
2	April 17, 2023	978-4-8019-7975-8	October 1, 2024	979-8-89160-232-8
3	November 16, 2023	978-4-8019-8201-7	February 25, 2025	979-8-89160-889-4
4	July 17, 2024	978-4-8019-8352-6	August 26, 2025	979-8-89373-633-5
5	February 17, 2025	978-4-8019-8564-3	February 24, 2026	979-8-89561-994-0

== See also ==
- Monologue Woven For You, another manga series by the same author
