= List of Flame of Recca chapters =

Flame of Recca is a Japanese manga series written and illustrated by Nobuyuki Anzai. The plot follows the protagonist Recca Hanabishi, a teenage ninja with the ability to manipulate fire and a descendant of the Hokage, a ninja clan wiped out centuries ago.

The Flame of Recca manga was originally serialized in Weekly Shōnen Sunday from 1995 to 2002, with a total of 329 chapters. The series was compiled into 33 tankōbon (collected volumes) and was published by Shogakukan from September 18, 1995, to April 18, 2002. Shogakukan also released the manga in 17 wideban volumes and, beginning in 2010, as part of its Comic Bunko label. The manga was licensed for North American distribution in English by Viz Media and United Kingdom distribution in English by Gollancz Manga. Viz released all 33 volumes from July 30, 2003, to November 10, 2009, while Gollancz released ten volumes between March 6 and November 28, 2006.

== Volumes ==
No.	Original release date	Original ISBN	English release date	English ISBN
1	September 18, 1995	978-4-09-123631-9	July 30, 2003	978-1-59116-066-3
1. "Shinobi and Princess" (忍と姫君, "Shinobi to Himegimi"); 2. "Kagehoshi" (影法師, "Kagehōshi"); 3. "Earth, then Wind" (土のち風, "Tsuchi nochi Kaze"); 4. "Fuko Kirisawa" (霧沢風子, "Kirisawa Fuko"); 5. "God of Wind" (風神, "Fūshin"); 6. "Storm Warning" (狂風波浪注意報, "Kyōfū Harō Chyōihō"); 7. "Wind, then Flame" (風のち炎, "Kaze nochi Honō"); 8. "Countdown" (COUNT DOWN); 9. "The Deathless Woman" (死の無い女, "Shi no Nai Onna")
2	November 18, 1995	978-4-09-123632-6	October 1, 2003	978-1-59116-067-0
10. "Yanagi Comes Over; 11. "The Water Swordsman (1) (Tokiya Mikagami)"; 12. "The Water Swordsman (2) (Water Sorcery)"; 13. "The Water Swordsman (3) (Scolded)"; 14. "The Water Swordsman (4) (Mikagami's Past)"; 15. "The Water Swordsman (5) (Water vs. Flame)"; 16. "The Water Swordsman (6) (Flames of Desperation)"; 17. "Memories of a Dream"; 18. "A Glimmer of Light"; 19. "Boy of Gold - Man of Wood"
3	January 18, 1996	978-4-09-123633-3	December 10, 2003	978-1-59116-094-6
20. "Kurei; 21. "Infiltration; 22. "The Marble Guardian; 23. "Reiran Katashira (1) (The Doll Master)"; 24. "Reiran Katashira (2) (Wind Wielder vs. Doll Master)"; 25. "Reiran Katashira (3) (True Identity)"; 26. "Earth Awakens"; 27. "Of Walls and Water"; 28. "An Unexpected Ally"; 29. "Reunion"
4	May 18, 1996	978-4-09-123634-0	February 4, 2004	978-1-59116-125-7
30. "Mikagami and Kaoru"; 31. "Fury"; 32. "Kurenai"; 33. "Living Flame"; 34. "Man-Eating Devil"; 35. "Eight-Headed Doom"; 36. "The Big Exit"; 37. "Rescue"; 38. "The Secret History (1)"; 39. "The Secret History (2)"
5	June 18, 1996	978-4-09-123635-7	April 10, 2004	978-1-59116-193-6
40. "You Called Me 'Mother'"; 41. "Challenge of the Eight Dragons"; 42. "Strength Carved In"; 43. "Urabutosatsujin"; 44. "The Battle Tournament Opens"; 45. "Ku 1 (Hyomon-Ken)"; 46. "Ku 2 (Lethal Weapon)"; 47. "Ku 3 (Hard + Soft)"; 48. "Ku 4 (Hurricane Fuko)"; 49. "Ku 5 (A Blizzard of Paper)"
6	September 18, 1996	978-4-09-123636-4	June 16, 2004	978-1-59116-316-9
50. "Ku (6) Paper Dancing with Flame"; 51. "Ku (7) Flak Attack"; 52. "Ku (8) Kukai the Merciful"; 53. "Ku (9) Homura"; 54. "Ku (10) Ku's Precious Defeat"; 55. "The One Who Shall Come"; 56. "The Mad Illusionist's Feast (1) (The Traitor's Brand)"; 57. "The Mad Illusionist's Feast (2) (Chimera - The Hybrid Beast)"; 58. "The Mad Illusionist's Feast (3) (The Horrible Tree)"; 59. "The Mad Illusionist's Feast (4) (The Man-Tree)"
7	November 18, 1996	978-4-09-123637-1	August 10, 2004	978-1-59116-448-7
60. "The Mad Illusionist's Feast (5) Stone Cold"; 61. "The Mad Illusionist's Feast (6) Meno"; 62. "The Mad Illusionist's Feast (7) The Sad-Faced Girl"; 63. "The Mad Illusionist's Feast (8) Hourglass Prison"; 64. "The Mad Illusionist's Feast (9) Jusshin-shu, Genjuro"; 65. "The Mad Illusionist's Feast (10) Ambition"; 66. "The Mad Illusionist's Feast (11) Setsuna Flashes"; 67. "The Mad Illusionist's Feast (12) The End of the Feast - The Top 16"; 68. "The One Kurei Protects"; 69. Bonus: "Flame of Recca - Flashback: One Windy Night"
8	January 18, 1997	978-4-09-123638-8	October 12, 2004	978-1-59116-480-7
69. "Live (1) The Night Before"; 70. "Live (2) The Curtain Rises"; 71. "Live (3) Domon Finds His Groove"; 72. "Live (4) Duo"; 73. "Live (5) Hard Lock"; 74. "Live (6) Heavy Mental"; 75. "Live (7) Kurei, My Love"; 76. "Live (8) Curtain Call"; 77. "Beautiful Monster - Deadly Talk"
9	April 18, 1997	978-4-09-123639-5	December 14, 2004	978-1-59116-481-4
78. "The Man From Circus"; 79. "The Vengenance Torch is Passed"; 80. "The Night Before"; 81. "The Time of Mara (1) Moon"; 82. "The Time of Mara (2) Crescent Moon"; 83. "The Time of Mara (3) Lunar Eclipse"; 84. "The Time of Mara (4) Ninja Battle"; 85. "The Time of Mara (5) Eight-Dragon Battle"; 86. "The Time of Mara (6) Howl of the Shapeless One"; 87. "The Time of Mara (7) Gashakura Enters the Battle"
10	July 18, 1997	978-4-09-123640-1	February 8, 2005	978-1-59116-636-8
88. "The Time of Mara (8) Victim of the Gale"; 89. "The Time of Mara (9) Magagumo - The Vicious Spider"; 90. "The Time of Mara (10) Five Small Spheres"; 91. "The Other Semi-Finals (1) Face to Face"; 92. "The Other Semi-Finals (2) A Lamp at Noon"; 93. "Ma (1) Crisis Outside the Ring"; 94. "Ma (2) Three-Dimensional Relay"; 95. "Ma (3) Ill-Met in Subspace"; 96. "Ma (4) Magensha's Secret"; 97. "Ma (5) The True Form Found"
11	August 9, 1997	978-4-09-125261-6	April 12, 2005	978-1-59116-741-9
98. "Ma (6) Reckoning"; 99. "J"; 100. "Wings of Angels, Wings of Dragons"; 101. "Footsteps of the Enemy"; 102. "The Mysterious Old Man"; 103. "The Curse of Love"; 104. "The Nightmare Before the Finals (1)"; 105. "The Nightmare Before the Finals (2)"; 106. "The Final Stage"; 107. "The Curtain Rises"
12	December 10, 1997	978-4-09-125262-3	July 7, 2005	978-1-59116-796-9
108. "The Faceless Warrior"; 109. "The Mystery Madogu"; 110. "Secret of the Curse"; 111. "Flesh and Iron"; 112. "Virus and Vaccine"; 113. "The Vanishing"; 114. "A World of Sand"; 115. "A New Challenge"; 116. "Bond"; 117. "The Power of Kai"
13	March 18, 1998	978-4-09-125263-0	August 16, 2005	978-1-59116-858-4
118. "Megurikyoza"; 119. "The Rock's Grudge"; 120. "Blood Sacrifice"; 121. "Caution to the Wind"; 122. "Girl of Healing"; 123. "Rui the Riddle-Master"; 124. "The Wicked Dragon"; 125. "Resurrection, and…" 126. "One Heart's Wish"; 127. "Mikoto × 2"
14	May 18, 1998	978-4-09-125264-7	October 11, 2005	978-1-4215-0014-0
128. "Cunning"; 129. "Poisonous Fang"; 130. "Cruelty"; 131. "The Real Winner"; 132. "Thin Air"; 133. "The Trump Card"; 134. "Joker's Special Power"; 135. "The Free Spirit"; 136. "The Savior"; 137. "The Legendary Mode"
15	August 8, 1998	978-4-09-125265-4	December 13, 2005	978-1-4215-0131-4
138. "Mode Six-Activated"; 139. "Tears"; 140. "Mêlée"; 141. "Recca Arrives"; 142. "The Rematch Begins"; 143. "The Fight Begins"; 144. "Release"; 145. "Two Mothers"; 146. "Sentiment"; 147. "True Feelings"
16	October 17, 1998	978-4-09-125266-1	February 14, 2006	978-1-4215-0250-2
148. "The Final Karyu"; 149. "Kokû's Flame"; 150. "Conclusion"; 151. "Out of the Rubble"; 152. "Hand-to-Hand Combat"; 153. "A Burden of Sorrow"; 154. "Shinobi of Flame"; 155. "A Wildly Spinning Cog"; 156. "True Evil Awakens"; 157. "The Third Urabutosatsujin Ends"
17	January 18, 1999	978-4-09-125267-8	April 11, 2006	978-1-4215-0381-3
158. "School is Heaven"; 159. "The Stalkers"; 160. "Rasen and Kirin"; 161. "Temporary Parting"; 162. "Two Masters"; 163. "Return to the Battlefield"; 164. "Kurei's Resurrection [The First Part]"; 165. "Kurei's Resurrection [The Second Part]"; 166. "The Underworld"; 167. "Tendo Jigoku's Curse"
18	April 17, 1999	978-4-09-125268-5	June 13, 2006	978-1-4215-0454-4
168. "A Fork in the Road"; 169. "Gaoh"; 170. "Tombstone"; 171. "Hisui"; 172. "Russian Roulette"; 173. "Natural Born"; 174. "Changing Fate"; 175. "Junkie"; 176. "Extreme Withdrawal Symptoms"; 177. "Kamui"
19	June 16, 1999	978-4-09-125269-2	August 8, 2006	978-1-4215-0455-1
178. "Revolving Arms"; 179. "The Human Weapon"; 180. "Slicing Limbs"; 181. "Girl"; 182. "The Horrible Lovers"; 183. "Maverick"; 184. "Choice"; 185. "A Second Choice"; 186. "Last Choice"; 187. "Kurei is Coming"
20	September 18, 1999	978-4-09-125270-8	October 10, 2006	978-1-4215-0456-8
188. "Fantasy Madness"; 189. "From Despair to…" 190. "…Hope"; 191. "Breakout"; 192. "Kirin of the Mind's Eye"; 193. "Worldly Desire Madness"; 194. "The Tendô Jigoku's Voice"; 195. "Walking Dead"; 196. "Kôkai Gyoku"; 197. "Crime and Punishment"
21	November 18, 1999	978-4-09-125651-5	December 12, 2006	978-1-4215-0457-5
198. "Gate of the Seal"; 199. "Battle Hymn"; 200. "The Blood-Soaked Scream of a Greedy and Tenacious Devil"; 201. "The One of Power"; 202. "Union of Evil"; 203. "No Longer Human"; 204. "Hisui's Decision"; 205. "Farewell, With a Smile"; 206. "Kurei Joins the Battle"; 207. "Incomplete Ultimate Life Form"
22	January 18, 2000	978-4-09-125652-2	February 13, 2007	978-1-4215-0893-1
208. "Melee"; 209. "Escape"; 210. "The Destruction of the Underground World"; 211. "Transfer Student"; 212. "Aoi Kagura"; 213. "Promise"; 214. "A Bold Plan"; 215. "Failure"; 216. "Farewell"; 217. "Opposing Forces"
23	April 18, 2000	978-4-09-125653-9	May 8, 2007	978-1-4215-0894-8
218. "To Meet Resshin"; 219. "Before the Final Battle - Three Days (1) Kaoru Koganei: A Farewell to Friends (First Part)"; 220. "Before the Final Battle - Three Days (2) Kaoru Koganei: A Farewell to Friends (Second Part)"; 221. "Before the Final Battle - Three Days (3) Domon Ishijima: Flower Message"; 222. "Before the Final Battle - Three Days (4) Fuka Kirisawa: Max Level!!!!!!!! (First Part)"; 223. "Before the Final Battle - Three Days (5) Fuka Kirisawa: Max Level!!!!!!!! (Second Part)"; 224. "Before the Final Battle - Three Days (6) Tokiya Mikagami…The Rest: Dream or Illusion"; 225. "Before the Final Battle - Three Days (7) Aoi and Renge: Envy and Innocence"; 226. "Resshin (1) Face to Face"; 227. "Resshin (2) Ouka"
24	June 17, 2000	978-4-09-125654-6	August 14, 2007	978-1-4215-0895-5
228. "Oka's Tale (1) The Princess and the Vassal"; 229. "Oka's Tale (2) Oka of Hokage"; 230. "Oka's Tale (3) Assassination"; 231. "Oka's Tale (4) War"; 232. "Oka's Tale (5) Last Wish"; 233. "Oka's Tale (6) Cherry Blossoms Flutter, Cherry Blossoms Fall"; 234. "And It Is Passed On"; 235. "Before the Final Battle - Three Days (8) Kurei: Black Sortie"; 236. "Fortress SODOM"; 237. "The Final War Begins"
25	August 9, 2000	978-4-09-125655-3	November 13, 2007	978-1-4215-0896-2
238. "The Rules of the Game"; 239. "Warrior Sisters"; 240. "3 vs. 3 (Miruku and Kurumi and Mikuru)"; 241. "Jusshin-Shu Showdown"; 242. "Kamui Redux"; 243. "The Clutches of Evil"; 244. "COMBINE"; 245. "Three-Headed Dragon"; 246. "Homepage"; 247. "Pulse of Madness"
26	October 18, 2000	978-4-09-125656-0	February 12, 2008	978-1-4215-0897-9
248. "Giant"; 249. "Lessons of Battle"; 250. "The Harder They Fall"; 251. "Silence of the Stone"; 252. "Kagerô Drops In"; 253. "Kagehôshi - In the Blink of an Eye"; 254. "Time of Destruction"; 255. "Botanical Weapon"; 256. "Twice Devil"; 257. "Mokuryu (Wooden Dragon)"
27	January 18, 2001	978-4-09-125657-7	May 13, 2008	978-1-4215-0898-6
258. "Antithesis"; 259. "Mokuren's Life"; 260. "Creeping Evil"; 261. "Swordsman of Water, Swordsman of Blood"; 262. "The Changing One"; 263. "Ura-Uruha's Most Evil Warrior"; 264. "Mumyô and Mongamae"; 265. "Trembling Evil Warrior"; 266. "Ghost"; 267. "Uruha Joins the Battle"; 268. "Detection"
28	March 17, 2001	978-4-09-125658-4	August 12, 2008	978-1-4215-1680-6
269. "Deception"; 270. "Shiguma"; 271. "Welcome to Marie's House"; 272. "Do You Like to Play?"; 273. "You're My Slave"; 274. "Punish Me, Please"; 275. "The Strange Man"; 276. "Zed"; 277. "The Desire to Live"; 278. "Being Human"
29	June 18, 2001	978-4-09-125659-1	November 11, 2008	978-1-4215-1681-3
279. "Opened Path"; 280. "Final Battle 1st Match: Domon vs. Hiruko (1) The Presence in the Back"; 281. "Final Battle 1st Match: Domon vs. Hiruko (2) Bloodshed"; 282. "Final Battle 1st Match: Domon vs. Hiruko (3) Sense of Duty"; 283. "Final Battle 1st Match: Domon vs. Hiruko (4) Iron Body, Will of Steel"; 284. "Final Battle 2nd Match: Kaoru vs. Joker (Joker Redux)"; 285. "Final Battle 3rd Match: Kaoru & Joker vs. Kirito (1) Two Questions"; 286. "Final Battle 3rd Match: Kaoru & Joker vs. Kirito (2) The Ageless Girl"; 287. "Final Battle 3rd Match: Kaoru & Joker vs. Kirito (3) Promise of a Rematch"; 288. "Final Battle 3rd Match: Kaoru & Joker vs. Kirito (4) The Last Question"; 289. "Final Battle 4th Match: Joker vs. Kadotsu (The Headstone That Cries Red Tears)"
30	September 18, 2001	978-4-09-125660-7	February 10, 2009	978-1-4215-2201-2
290. "Final Battle 5th Match: Kagerô vs. Rasen & Kirin (1) Lost and Found"; 291. "Final Battle 5th Match: Kagerô vs. Rasen & Kirin (2) The Giftf of Death"; 292. "Final Battle 6th Match: Fuko vs. Raiha (1) Dueling Magogu"; 293. "Final Battle 6th Match: Fuko vs. Raiha (2) Fujin & Raijin"; 294. "Final Battle 6th Match: Fuko vs. Raiha (3) The Blood of Hokage"; 295. "Final Battle 6th Match: Fuko vs. Raiha (4) Lightning Rain and Raging Storm"; 296. "Final Battle 6th Match: Fuko vs. Raiha (5) Supporting the Wind"; 297. "Final Battle 6th Match: Fuko vs. Raiha (6) Loyal Retainer"; 298. "Final Battle 7th Match: Tokiya vs. Meguri Kyoza (1) Reunion with the Master"; 299. "Final Battle 7th Match: Tokiya vs. Meguri Kyoza (2) Master and Pupil"
31	November 17, 2001	978-4-09-126331-5	May 12, 2009	978-1-4215-2202-9
300. "Final Battle 7th Match: Tokiya vs. Meguri Kyoza (3) The Truth"; 301. "Final Battle 7th Match: Tokiya vs. Meguri Kyoza (4) The End of Revenge"; 302. "Final Battle 8th Match: Kurei vs. Renge (1) Imitation and Original"; 303. "Final Battle 8th Match: Kurei vs. Renge (2) Denial of Existence"; 304. "Final Battle 9th Match: Recca vs. Aoi (1) Conflict"; 305. "Final Battle 9th Match: Recca vs. Aoi (2) Creatures of the Deep"; 306. "Final Battle 9th Match: Recca vs. Aoi (3) Friends"; 307. "Final Battle 9th Match: Recca vs. Aoi (4) Affirmations of Existence"; 308. "Final Battle: Tendo Jigoku (1) The Sacrificial Girl"; 309. "Final Battle: Tendo Jigoku (2) Go Meet Oka"
32	March 18, 2002	978-4-09-126332-2	August 11, 2009	978-1-4215-2203-6
310. "Final Battle: Tendo Jigoku (3) The Other Tendo Jigoku"; 311. "Final Battle: Tendo Jigoku (4) Awakening of Hell"; 312. "Final Battle: Tendo Jigoku (5) The Final Enemy"; 313. "Final Battle: Tendo Jigoku (6) Somebody Get Up"; 314. "Final Battle: Tendo Jigoku (7) Magic"; 315. "Final Battle: Tendo Jigoku (8) Spinning Voice"; 316. "Final Battle: Tendo Jigoku (9) Seven Dragons"; 317. "Final Battle: Tendo Jigoku (10) Light Unleashed"; 318. "Final Battle: Tendo Jigoku (11) Between Hope and Despair"; 319. "Final Battle: Tendo Jigoku (12) Voices Reach the Heart"; 320. "Final Battle: Tendo Jigoku (13) Resting Place"
33	April 18, 2002	978-4-09-126333-9	November 10, 2009	978-1-4215-2204-3
321. "Final Battle: Tendo Jigoku (14) Fallen Heaven"; 322. "Final Battle: Tendo Jigoku (15) Flame Rises"; 323. "Flame of Recca (1) The Flame Dragons"; 324. "Flame of Recca (2) Resshin, the Eighth Dragon"; 325. "Flame of Recca (3) Flame of Recca"; 326. "The End of Hokage"; 327. "Journey to the Days of Yore"; 328. "Death in a Faraway Place"; 329. "Recca & Yanagi"
