= Damekko Dōbutsu =

Japanese manga series

- First volume cover

だめっこどうぶつ
- Genre: Comedy
- Manga
- Written by: Noriko Kuwata
- Published by: Takeshobo
- Magazine: Manga Life
- Original run: November 2001 – 2003
- Volumes: 5
- Anime television series
- Directed by: Setsuko Shibuichi
- Written by: Mitsuyo Suenaga
- Music by: Tsunta Kobayashi
- Studio: Magic Bus
- Original network: Kids Station
- Original run: 17 January 2005 – 21 February 2005
- Episodes: 26

Damekko Dōbutsu (Japanese: だめっこどうぶつ; lit. "Useless Animals") is a Japanese manga series by Noriko Kuwata serialized in Manga Life since the November 2001 issue. It was later adapted into a comedy anime series on Kids Station, a Japanese broadcast satellite station. It features characters that wear kigurumi costumes. Each character in the anime does not live up to the standards of their species, making them outcasts who must live in the "Useless" Forest. The main character, Uruno, is a wolf who has the personality of a shy rabbit; meanwhile, his friend and foil, Usahara the rabbit, has a wolf-like dominance and aggression. Each of the 26 episodes is 5 minutes long, bringing the total series to 130 minutes (2 hours 10 minutes).

== Main characters ==
Uruno
Voiced by: Motoki Takagi
Uruno is a wolf who sent to live in the forest with other 'useless' animals since he fails to act lupine or possess any traits of his species. Instead of being aggressive and fierce like a wolf, he is very shy and passive, often at the receiving end of Usahara's physical outbursts. Usahara, the rabbit, can be seen as a foil to Uruno since the rabbit is more assertive and the wolf is more timid in this case. He has a crush on Chiiko-chan, hoping that even though he's useless, he will win her heart someday. He is very easily moved to tears and can be said to be quite gullible, particularly in the face of Yunihiko's trickery.

Usahara
Voiced by: Noriaki Sugiyama
Usahara is an aggressive, bad-tempered rabbit who chain smokes. He often gets annoyed at Uruno and physically abuses him, but it seems he does care for the wolf, as shown when Uruno disappears in episode 26. He is revealed to have bouts of melancholy, which usually resolve themselves in a matter of days. He has a competitive friendship with Yunihiko, and the two often try to one-up each other.

Chiiko
Voiced by: Sayaka Narita

Chiiko is a clumsy cheetah girl who Uruno has a huge crush on. She is clueless, bad at running, and unskilled at hunting, but is very friendly and well-liked. She is also a member of the Female Feline Club, along with fellow wildcats Kuron, Rinku, and Piyu. She is shown to enjoy cooking, but is a miserable failure at it, as the prepared food leaves her friends quite ill. In spite of this, Uruno always eats the offered food as a show of his love.

Yunihiko
Voiced by: Toshiyuki Morikawa
Yunihiko, the Master of the Forest, is a devilish, 'unpure' unicorn who enjoys drinking sake and eating fried squid. He is Peganosuke's twin brother. Mischievous, but never malevolent, he often lies to manipulate Uruno and Usahara for his own amusement. On rare occasions he is seen to have a conscience, but this does not stop him from thoroughly enjoying getting the other animals riled up.

Peganosuke
Voiced by: Hiroshi Kamiya
Peganosuke is a Pegasus and Yunihiko's twin brother, who works as a courier delivering packages. He is very shy and timid, but quickly becomes friends with Uruno, due to their shared lack of self-confidence. He takes Uruno for flights, after Uruno helps him to realize that he should enjoy life and see things never seen before.

Takaoka
Voiced by: Makoto Aoki
Takaoka is a grumpy, near-sighted eagle who is at constant conflict with Usahara. He is poor at hunting, and somewhat cowardly. In the first episode he declares that he and Uruno should ally themselves together against Usahara, but this is short-lived, because neither is strong enough to fight the rabbit. Takaoka has a secret crush on Fukurou, an owl.

== Secondary characters ==
Kumanee
Voiced by: Hana Takeda
Kumanee is a bear and traveling saleswoman. She is outgoing and friendly, often sharing leftover goods with her companions. She shares a deep bond with Usahara, being his good friend while also his rival in combat.

Kumakawa
Kumakawa is Kumanee's younger brother. He is lively dancer and refers to himself a "genius dancer".
Kuron
Kuron is a panther who is the most tomboyish girl in the Female Feline Club, and does not frighten easily.
Rinku
Rinku is a mountain cat and the most feminine member of the Female Feline Club.
Piyu
Piyu is a puma) and member of the Female Feline Club who is always seen wearing a jogging suit.
Sakamata
Sakamata is a calm and lonely orca who becomes Uruno's friend quickly. He cannot swim and needs a life preserver to stay afloat.
Fukurou
Fukurou is a straightforward owl who says exactly what she thinks. She has a crush on Peganosuke.

== Music ==
Opening theme

- "Sekai de Ichiban Boku ga Suki!" by Ryōko Shintani

Ending theme

- "Life is Free" by Ryōko Shintani
