= Obatarian =

Japanese manga series

- Cover of the first volume of Obatarian

オバタリアン
- Genre: Comedy
- Manga
- Written by: Katsuhiko Hotta
- Published by: Takeshobo
- Magazine: Manga Life
- Original run: 1988 – 1998
- Volumes: 13
- Anime television film
- Directed by: Tetsurō Amino
- Written by: Shun'ichi Yukimuro, Toshiki Inoue
- Music by: Kohei Tanaka
- Studio: Sunrise
- Original network: TV Asahi
- Released: April 3, 1990
- Runtime: 70 minutes

Obatarian (Japanese: オバタリアン) is a yonkoma manga series by Katsuhiko Hotta. It was serialized in Manga Life, Manga Life Original, and Really Happened Pleasant Stories (all published by Takeshobo) from 1988 to 1998, with a total of 13 volumes released by the publisher (with some reprints after 2000).

A one-off anime television special was produced by Sunrise and aired on TV Asahi on April 3, 1990.

The title Obatarian (a portmanteau of おばさん obasan "middle-aged woman" and Battalion from the 1985 zombie comedy film The Return of the Living Dead) became a popular Japanese buzzword in the late 1980s referring to pushy, shameless, or ill-mannered middle-aged women.

The series won the 1989 Bungeishunjū Manga Award.

== Etymology ==
The term originates from the 1986 horror film The Return of the Living Dead (released in Japan as Battalion). It is a portmanteau of "おばさん" (obasan, middle-aged woman) and "バタリアン" (Batarian). "Battalion" implies a large group or swarm, hence the connotation of hordes of obasan.

The manga satirizes ordinary, shameless middle-aged women who behave rudely and impose on others without hesitation, sometimes engaging in behavior bordering on criminal.

== Characters ==
The following characters appear in the anime adaptation:

Kinuyo Obata (小畑 絹代, Obata Kinuyo)
Voiced by: Tomie Kataoka
The protagonist. She has the same appearance as the "Big Buddha perm Obatarian" from the original manga. She is domineering and shameless.
Yoshio Obata (小畑 良夫, Obata Yoshio)
Voiced by: Kei Tomiyama
Kinuyo's husband. A thin, bespectacled salaryman who is completely henpecked.
Seiko Obata (小畑 聖子, Obata Seiko)
Voiced by: Yūko Sasaki
Kinuyo's daughter and a high school student. She often suffers embarrassment due to her mother's behavior.
Minoru Obata (小畑 ミノル, Obata Minoru)
Voiced by: Chika Sakamoto
Kinuyo's son and a elementary school student. He is often troubled by his mother's antics.
Hiroe (広江)
Voiced by: Kazuyo Aoki
Kinuyo's friend. Matches the "hair in a bun Obatarian" from the manga.
Sayuri (小百合)
Voiced by: Yoshino Ōtori
Another of Kinuyo's friends. Matches the "triangular glasses skinny Obatarian."
Dr. Powers (パワーズ博士)
Voiced by: Toshiya Ueda
A scientist who despairs at the future after seeing surviving Obatarians after a nuclear war.
King Enma (エンマ大王)
Voiced by: Saburō Kamei
The ruler of Hell who is overwhelmed by Kinuyo.
Kunihiko and Michiko
Newlyweds who move next door and are affected by the Obatarians.

(Additional minor characters include a bank robber, a glasses-wearing young man, teachers, and others who encounter the main cast.)

== Anime ==
=== Staff ===
- Planning: Sunrise
- Original work: Katsuhiko Hotta
- Script: Shun'ichi Yukimuro, Toshiki Inoue, Shōji Tōike
- Character design & chief animation director: Yoshinobu Inano
- Art: Tōru Hishiyama
- Director: Tetsurō Amino
- Music: Kōhei Tanaka
- Other staff listed on the official site.

=== Theme songs ===
All songs by THE Truehearts (THE真心ブラザーズ):

"Obatarian no Theme"
Opening theme
"Kāchan" (母ちゃん)
Ending theme

=== Episode list ===
No.	Title	Script	Storyboard	Episode Director	Animation Supervisor	Art
#1	"The World Exists for Me! Anything Goes!"	Shun'ichi Yukimuro	Kiyoshi Egami		Hiroshi Aisaka	Jun'ichi Higashi
#2	"Do I Want to Become an Obatarian?"	Toshiki Inoue	Shin'ichirō Watanabe		Toshihiro Kawamoto	Jun'ichi Higashi
#3	"Please Mom, Don't Come to School"	Shun'ichi Yukimuro	Mitsuko Kase	Yoshihiro Yamaguchi	Hiromi Muranaka	Mitsuharu Miyamae
#4	"I Want to Go Far Away – Secret Hot Spring Trip"	Shun'ichi Yukimuro	Takehiro Kitahara	Shin'ichirō Watanabe	Hideyuki Motohashi	Mitsuharu Miyamae
#5	"Dreaming Obatarian: Furious Sexual Harassment"	Shōji Tōike	Tetsurō Amino	Hiroyuki Akiyama	Yoshinobu Inano	Tōru Hishiyama
#6	"An Obatarian Dies Twice!!"	Toshiki Inoue	Mitsuko Kase	Kiyoshi Egami	Yoshinobu Inano	Kazuko Katsui

== Derivative / Cultural impact ==
The term spread rapidly after being used in reader letters complaining about middle-aged women's manners. It became a common word for pushy or shameless middle-aged women. Politician Takako Doi embraced the term, and it won the Gold Prize in the 1989 U-CAN New Word and Buzzword Award (with Doi and Hotta as joint recipients).

A Fuji TV special titled We Are the Cheerful Obatarians was broadcast, though unrelated to the manga beyond the title. It was a hidden-camera prank show.

In 1992, Japanese reggae artist Little Boogie Man released a song titled "Obatarian."

== Manga ==
Volumes 1–9 were released without barcodes or ISBNs. Later volumes:

- Volume 10: ISBN 4-88475-725-4
- Volume 11: ISBN 4-88475-820-X
- Volume 12: ISBN 4-8124-5056-X
- Volume 13: ISBN 4-8124-5190-6
