= Masashi Ueda (manga artist) =

Japanese manga artist

- Born: 1947 (age 78–79) Tokyo, Japan
- Area: Manga artist
- Notable works: Kobo, the Li'l Rascal

Masashi Ueda (植田 まさし, Ueda Masashi; born 1947) is a manga artist who wrote Kobo, the Li'l Rascal, a four-panel comic that has headlined Daily Yomiuri since 1982 and has amassed over 10,000 strips and 60 compilation volumes, as well as inspiring an anime adaptation.

Ueda began drawing comic book strips when he worked in his brother's cram school. Ueda began producing Furiten-kun, a comic book strip about a mahjong player, in 1979. In 1982 Ueda won the Bungeishunjū Manga Award. During that year he began producing Kobo, the Li'l Rascal. In 1988, as part of the United Nations International Literacy Year he visited Nepal as a special commissioner. In 1999 the Japan Comic Artists Association awarded Ueda a prize.

== Works ==
Title	Year	Notes	Refs
Furiten-kun	1980–94	Serialized in Kindai Mahjong, Kindai Mahjong Original, Gamble Punch, Manga Life; Published by Takeshobo in 19 volumes	
Kobo, the Li'l Rascal	1982–present	Serialized in Yomiuri Shimbun; Published by Soyosha in 60 volumes, Houbunsha in 33 volumes	
Osusume Furiten-kun	1991–92	Serialized in Manga Life; Published by Takeshobo in 8 volumes	
Shin Furiten-kun	2002–2026	Serialized in Manga Life; Published by Takeshobo in 3 volumes	
hon nya ra gokko kariagekun (ほんにゃらゴッコ かりあげクン (ja:かりあげクン))		Published by Action Comics in 48 volumes	
Otobokekachō (おとぼけ課長, Contact innocent manager)		Published by Honbunsha in 27 volumes	
Furiten-kun (フリテンくん)		Published by Bamboo Comics in 17 volumes	
Tokumori! Ueda masashi (特盛!植田まさし)		Published by Manga Time / My Pal Comics in 11 volumes	
Sukkarakāsan (すっから母さん)		Published 8 volumes	
Masashi-kun (まさし君)		Published by Hobunsha Comics in 5 volumes	
Nonki-kun (のんき君)		Published by Hobunsha Comics in 4 volumes	
Rakuten Papa (らくてんパパ)		Published in Kondansha Comics, 3 volumes	
Nikoniko ega otto (にこにこエガ夫)		Published by Bamboo comics, 2 volumes	
