= Nobuyuki Anzai =

Japanese manga artist

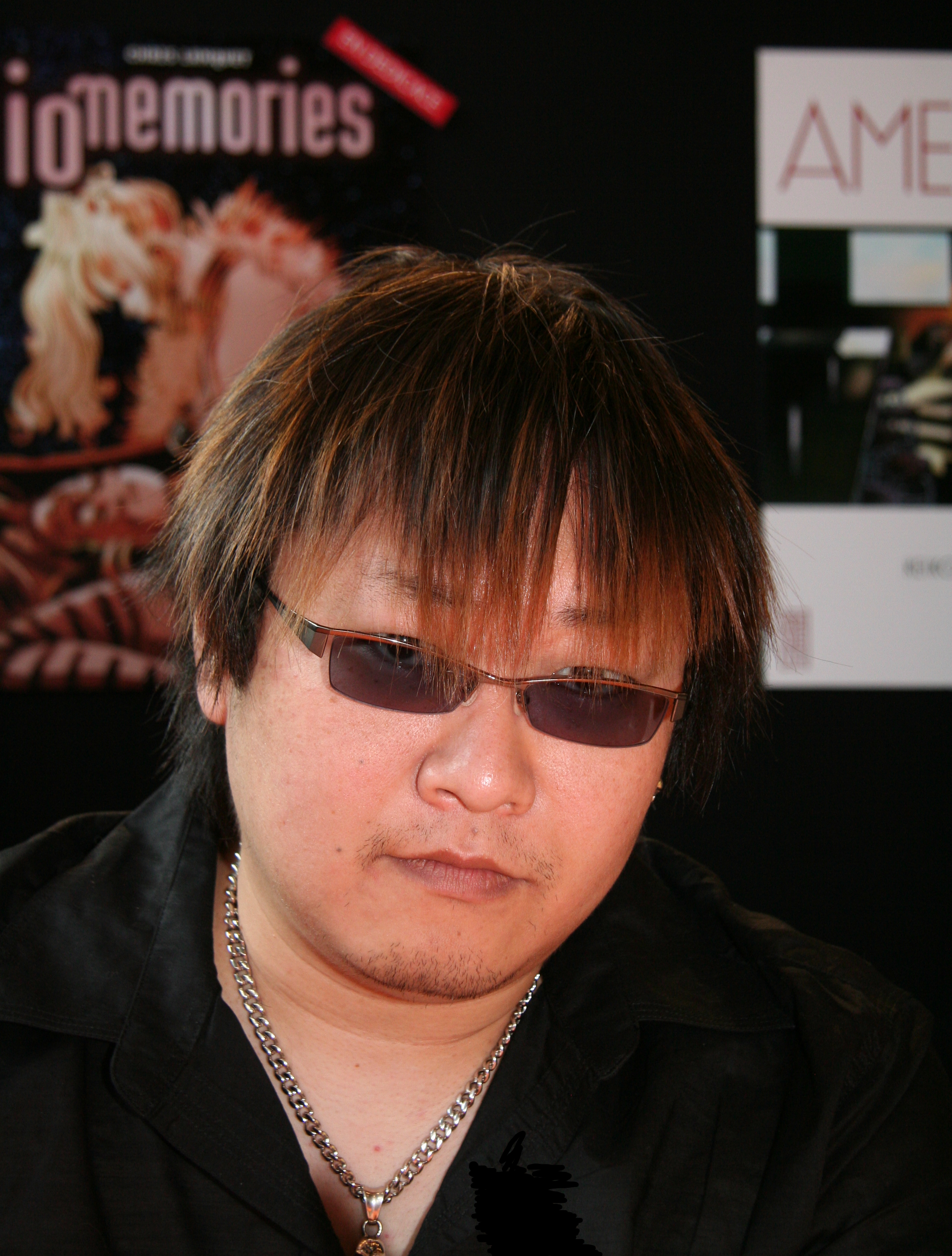
- Born: August 19, 1972 (age 54); Tateyama, Chiba, Japan
- Occupation: Manga artist
- Known for: Flame of Recca and MÄR
- Website: http://s.ameblo.jp/cray-g-g/

Nobuyuki Anzai (安西 信行, Anzai Nobuyuki; born August 19, 1972) is a Japanese manga artist Best known for creating Flame of Recca and MÄR. He was an assistant of Kazuhiro Fujita. He made his debut as a manga artist after he received an honorable mention in Shinjin Comic Taisho (Shogakukan Beginners Editions) with a oneshot called Ken 2 Strenger.

== Works ==
- Rocket Princess (ロケットプリンセス, R・Princess) (1994 Shogakukan)
- Flame of Recca (烈火の炎, Rekka no Honō) (1995–2002 Shogakukan)
- MÄR (2003–2007 Shogakukan)
- Mixim 11 (ミクシム・イレブン) (2008–2011 Shogakukan)
- Crazy Maniax (クレイジーマニアックス) (2008 Shogakukan)
- Koutetsu Manroku -Metal★Rock- (鋼鉄漫録―メタ★ろっく―) (2014–2017 Takeshobo)
- Uruha no Sekai de Arisugawa (麗の世界で有栖川) (2018–present Shogakukan)

== Assistants ==
- Kōichirō Hoshino (Flame of Recca, MÄR)
- Makoto Raiku (Flame of Recca)
- Michiteru Kusaba (Flame of Recca)
- Hisashi Nosaka (Flame of Recca)
- Masahiro Ikeno (MÄR)
