= Kōichirō Hoshino =

Japanese manga artist

Kōichirō Hoshino (星野倖一郎, Hoshino Kōichirō; born May 29 in Tokyo) is a Japanese manga artist.

== Works ==
- Kyuuketsuki (Manga Newcomers Award)
- Bondo ga kiru!
- Funafuto Fish Grapple
- MÄR Omega
- Popcorn Avatar
- Aura: Maryūinkōga Saigo no Tatakai

== See also ==
- Nobuyuki Anzai
