= Aura: Koga Maryuin's Last War =

Japanese light novel

- First light novel volume cover

AURA ～魔竜院光牙最後の闘い～ (Aura: Maryūinkōga Saigo no Tatakai)
- Genre: Fantasy; Romantic comedy
- Light novel
- Written by: Romeo Tanaka
- Illustrated by: Mebae
- Published by: Shogakukan
- Imprint: Gagaga Bunko
- Published: July 18, 2008
- Manga
- Written by: Romeo Tanaka
- Illustrated by: Kōichirō Hoshino
- Published by: Shogakukan
- Magazine: Shōnen Sunday S
- Original run: February 25, 2012 – March 25, 2013
- Volumes: 4
- Anime film
- Directed by: Seiji Kishi
- Produced by: Tatsuya Ishiguro; Takema Okamura; Hajime Maruyama; Kozue Kaneniwa; Yūka Sakurai
- Written by: Makoto Uezu (composition}; Jun Kumagai (scripts)
- Music by: Michiru Ōshima
- Studio: AIC ASTA
- Licensed by: NA: Sentai Filmworks
- Released: April 13, 2013
- Runtime: 83 minutes
- icon

Aura: Koga Maryuin's Last War (AURA ～魔竜院光牙最後の闘い～, Aura Maryūinkōga Saigo no Tatakai) is a Japanese light novel written by Romeo Tanaka, with illustrations by Mebae, published by Shogakukan under their Gagaga Bunko imprint in July 2008. A manga adaptation by Kōichirō Hoshino was serialized in Shogakukan's Shōnen Sunday S between February 2012 and March 2013. An anime film by AIC ASTA premiered in April 2013.

== Premise ==
Ichiro Sato formerly suffered from a case of chūnibyō, which caused him to be bullied throughout middle school. Now in high school, he strives to be a normal student. However, his teacher has entrusted him with the care of a girl with a similar case of delusions and a victim of bullying.

== Characters ==
Ichirō Satō (佐藤 一郎, Satō Ichirō)
Voiced by: Nobunaga Shimazaki (Japanese); Corey Hartzog (English)
Ryōko Satō (佐藤 良子, Satō Ryōko)
Voiced by: Kana Hanazawa (Japanese); Juliet Simmons (English)
Hino (樋野)
Voiced by: Chiwa Saitō (Japanese); Krystal LaPorte (English)
Yamamoto (山本)
Voiced by: Hiroki Yasumoto (Japanese); Andrew Love (English)
Shinako Kobato (子鳩 志奈子, Kobato Shinako)
Voiced by: Hisako Kanemoto (Japanese); Sara Omelas (English)
Dorisen (担任)
Voiced by: Takahiro Mizushima (Japanese); Jeff McMorrough (English)
Yūta Takahashi (高橋 裕太, Takahashi Yūta)
Voiced by: Ryōhei Kimura (Japanese); Clint Bickham (English)
Yumina Ōshima (大島 弓菜, Ōshima Yumina)
Voiced by: Marina Inoue (Japanese); Carli Mosier (English)
Aki Imawano (忌野 アキ, Imawano Aki)
Voiced by: Satomi Akesaka (Japanese); Katie Porterfield (English)
Kinoshita (木下)
Voiced by: Kenichirou Matsuda (Japanese); Blake Shepard (English)
Osamu Suzuki (鈴木 おさむ, Suzuki Osamu)
Voiced by: Kappei Yamaguchi (Japanese); Adam Gibbs (English)
Tatsuo Andō (安藤 たつお, Andō Tatsuo)
Voiced by: Kishō Taniyama (Japanese); Scott Gibbs (English)
Oda (織田)
Voiced by: Yū Kobayashi (Japanese); Margaret McDonald (English)
Kume (久米)
Voiced by: Showtaro Morikubo (Japanese); Scott Gibbs (English)

== Media ==
=== Light novel ===
Aura: Maryūin Kōga Saigo no Tatakai is a 360-page light novel written by Romeo Tanaka, with illustrations by Mebae. It was published on July 18, 2008, by Shogakukan under their Gagaga Bunko imprint.

=== Manga ===
A manga adaptation, illustrated by Kōichirō Hoshino, was serialized in Shogakukan Shōnen Sunday S, from February 25, 2012, to March 25, 2013. Four tankōbon volumes were released between July 18, 2012, and April 10, 2013.

=== Anime ===
An anime film, produced by AIC ASTA and directed by Seiji Kishi, was released in Japanese theaters on April 13, 2013, and was released on Blu-ray Disc and DVD on September 18, 2013. In North America, the film's Blu-ray and DVD were released by Sentai Filmworks on December 8, 2015.
