= Uruha no Sekai de Arisugawa =

Japanese manga series by Nobuyuki Anzai

- First tankōbon volume cover

麗の世界で有栖川
- Genre: Fantasy comedy
- Manga
- Written by: Nobuyuki Anzai
- Published by: Shogakukan
- Imprint: Shōnen Sunday Comics
- Magazine: Shōnen Sunday S
- Original run: February 23, 2018 – present
- Volumes: 11
- icon

Uruha no Sekai de Arisugawa (麗の世界で有栖川; lit. 'Arisugawa in the Beautiful World') is a Japanese manga series written and illustrated by Nobuyuki Anzai. It has been serialized in Shogakukan's shōnen manga magazine Shōnen Sunday S since February 2018.

== Plot ==
Sixteen-year-old high school student Arisugawa (有栖川) strongly dislikes men, earning her the nickname "Man-Hunting Arisugawa" (男狩りの有栖川, Otokogari no Arisugawa) for fending off suitors with needles. Her aversion stems from her father, whose habit of walking around naked at home made her despise male anatomy. One day, while chatting with friends, a man in black robes suddenly appears from the air, steps on her, and flees. Enraged, Arisugawa chases him for hours before suddenly falling unconscious. She awakens in an unfamiliar place and discovers, to her horror, that she has been transformed into a man. A giant man named Jishō (磁正) approaches her and takes her to Uruwa (麗), a secret ninja training facility exclusively for men. There, she encounters Kuro (黒), the black-robed man and leader of the subordinate "Black Group" (黒組, Kuro-gumi). Kuro explains that her transformation resulted from an ancient cursed ema that grants one wish. Kuro, insecure about his feminine appearance, had attempted to sacrifice Arisugawa to wish for masculinity, but the ritual backfired, transforming her instead. Now trapped in a male body, Arisugawa must navigate life among the very men she despises.

== Publication ==
Written and illustrated by Nobuyuki Anzai, Uruha no Sekai de Arisugawa started in Shogakukan's shōnen manga magazine Shōnen Sunday S on February 23, 2018. Shogakukan has collected its chapters into individual tankōbon volumes. The first volume was released on October 18, 2018. As of June 18, 2026, eleven volumes have been released.

=== Volumes ===
No.	Japanese release date	Japanese ISBN
1	October 18, 2018	978-4-09-128568-3
2	September 18, 2019	978-4-09-129460-9
3	May 18, 2020	978-4-09-850130-4
4	January 18, 2021	978-4-09-850378-0
5	September 17, 2021	978-4-09-850686-6
6	June 17, 2022	978-4-09-851154-9
7	February 16, 2023	978-4-09-851607-0
8	November 17, 2023	978-4-09-853021-2
9	November 17, 2023	978-4-09-853580-4
10	June 18, 2025	978-4-09-854156-0
11	June 18, 2026	978-4-09-854657-2
