= Manga Life =

Japanese manga magazine

- Manga Life, August 2007 cover
- Categories: Manga
- Frequency: Monthly
- Publisher: Takeshobo
- First issue: October 1984
- Final issue: July 2022
- Country: Japan
- Based in: Tokyo
- Language: Japanese
- Website: Official website

Manga Life (まんがライフ, Manga Raifu) was a manga magazine published monthly by Takeshobo in Japan since the November 1984 issue (published in October 1984). Its original title was Gag da (ギャグダ, Gyagu da), and the change to Manga Life was made to better compete with Manga Time, a rival magazine published by Houbunsha. Most of the series appearing in the magazine used the yonkoma format. The magazine is released monthly on the 17th, though it sometime appeared on shelves slightly before or after that, depending on the speed of actual distribution. Manga Life was published in B5 size, and its Japanese magazine code was 18635.

Manga Club merged with Manga Life in April 2020. Manga Life suspended publication on July 27, 2022. The majority of its titles moved to Manga Life Original.

== Series ==
=== Final titles ===
The following series appeared in Manga Life at the time of its final issue. The issue of first appearance is noted if known. Series are listed alphabetically by title:

- Arai Kiyokazu no 4-koma Wideshow (Kiyokazu Arai, 2001)
- Ayumi Full Throttle!! (Masaki Mashū, February 2007)
- Bonobono (Mikio Igarashi, June 1986)
- Furiten-kun (Masashi Ueda, January 2001; title was changed to Shin Furiten-kun in March 2002)
- Kokemomo-san (Yumiko Nakashima, January 2007)
- Kuriko no Himekuri Calendar (Reiko Terashima)
- Mentsuyu Hitori Meshi (Mizuki Setoguchi, December 2016)
- Momota, Eiga Mimasuta (Momota Nakahara, October 2002)
- Nanako Masshigura! (Keiko Koike, July 2004)
- Natchan wa ne!? (Hiroko Minami, 1996)
- Neko Goyomi (Makoto Sawada, August 2005)
- Nemuranai Eve (Mineo Maya, annually in January issue from January 2002 to January 2022)
- Ojojojo (Cool-kyou Shinja, June 2012)
- Okiraku Gokuraku Debu Neko Seikatsu (Bibikku, January 2007)
- Ragan de Go! (Mikiko Yoshida, April 2003)
- Takami Tallest (Riyo Mizuki, May 2003)
- Teketeke My Heart (Izumi Takemoto, February 2000)
- Uwa no Sora Tutorial (Takayuki Mizushina, October 2005)
- Waku Waku Working (Rui Ōhashi, April 2001)
- Yoiko no Shigoto (Hiroaki Magari, June 2006)

=== Historical ===
The following series appeared in Manga Life. The dates of appearance are noted if known. Series are listed alphabetically by title:

- Ashita mo Arashi! (Tomoko Ogasawara, September 2004 - December 2006)
- Because, Yankee-Mama (Reiko Sumi, 1998–2000)
- Bikei to Iu Na no Kachō (Riko Mikata, 1999 May 2003)
- Bitter Heart Sugarcoat (Shinobu Arima, May 2001–2002)
- Boku no Katei Kyōshi (Tōko Shiwasu, October 2002 - September 2004)
- Boku no Suki na Yukko Sensei (Issei Kawabata, June 1986 - ?)
- Chōkazoku Oyako Donburi (Yoshiko Tsuchida)
- Damekko Dōbutsu (Noriko Kuwata, 2001–2003)
- Datte L Size (Keiji Murakami)
- Dōbutsu no Oshaberi (Akira Shinsenji, July 2005–2014)
- Dochira Made! (Nobara Nonaka, 1997–2002)
- Doki Doki Kyōdai Life (Hayako Gotō, December 1999 - May 2003)
- Doki Doki School Hours (Tamami Momose, February 1997 - April 2013)
- Dorīn Atchan (Akkiu, ? - June 2004)
- Dōsuru!? Wanko (Yukie Nasu, March 2003 - October 2009)
- Furiten-kun (Masashi Ueda, November 1984–1994)
- Furiten-kun 2000 (Masashi Ueda, January - December 2000)
- Futari ga Ichiban (Mariko Kubota, September 1997 - September 2006)
- Gokigen Wakana-san (Hideharu Akaza)
- Gokuraku Gohan (Miriko Takeda, ? - 1997)
- Good Morning Teacher (Naoki Shigeno, October 1999 - June 2012)
- Hakui no Ten-chan (Sanpei Yamada)
- Harikiri Paper Boys (Kuranosuke Chūshin, October 2003 - February 2005)
- Hiruma-san (Shin Itō, September 2003 - March 2006)
- Honma Desse Okyaku-san!! (Takashi Murakami, 1996–2000)
- Hontō ni Atta Yukai na Hanashi (Miruku Tajima, 1995 - March 2006)
- Ikinari Don-chan (Aoi Morimura, ? - 2002)
- Itoshi no Deburin (Issei Kawabata, ? - 1996)
- Itoshi no My Honey (Penta Suzuki, December 2002 - May 2007)
- Itsumo Kokoro ni Minamikaze (Megumi Tanzawa, October 2005 - May 2007)
- Kachō! Deban Desu (Akira Shibata)
- Kachō to Yobanai de (Ikura Chihaya, July 2006–2007)
- Kitaikebukuro Kasumi-sō (Fumi Saimon & Eri Sakai, November 2004 - May 2006)
- Kochira Nekomeya Eigyōchū (Akiko Yoshimoto, 2000–2001)
- Kyō no Osusume! (Tomoko Nitta, 1996 - June 2005)
- Love Love Aishiteru (Linda Gyūnyū, October 2004 - February 2007)
- Machi no Marriage (Masayuki Mori, 1998 - January 2002)
- Makashite Ōsakajō (Chino Kurumi, ? - April 2001)
- Mariko no Koibito (Mikiko Yoshida, 1997 - March 2003)
- Moe-chan wa Middle Name (Anzu Koguma, December 2005 - July 2007)
- Motemote Nē-chan (Miho Arimoto, April 2004–2008)
- Muteki no OL!! Kandori Tsubasa (Fumizō Morita, 1999–2002)
- Naku na! Tanaka-kun (Hiroshi Tanaka)
- Naomi no Tsureteke Kōshien (Yoshio Kawashima, August 2003 - November 2006)
- Neko no Te Kashimasu! (Yōko Sanri, 1999 - October 2004)
- Nekomimi House (Chino Kurumi, May 2001–2002)
- Niko Niko Egao (Masashi Ueda, 1995–1999)
- Nohohon Nori-san (Shinri Mori, 1999–2002)
- Obatarian (Katsuhiko Hotta, 1988–1998)
- Ōbeya Wappa-kun (Hisashi Taira)
- Okashi na Kazoku (Chino Kurumi, ? - 1996)
- Omezame! Megu-chan (Tomoko Nitta, July 2005 - August 2006)
- Oneechan ga Kita (Rikō Anzai, July 2011 - June 2020)
- Otōsan wa Toshishita (Akira Hōjō, February 2007–2011)
- Oyome ni Oniduma (Getsu Takebayashi, January 2006 - December 2007)
- PaPaPa Paradise (Chino Kurumi, July 2002 - September 2011)
- Pocket Tama-chan (Eiji Ide, 2000 - January 2004)
- Pokky-kun (Shō Tanaka, ? - 1997)
- Poyopoyo Kansatsu Nikki (Rū Tatsuki, February 2004 - April 2016)
- Puapua Lips (Hayako Gotō, November 2006 - October 2006)
- Puppet-Muppets no Kochira Chinjū Beya!! (Puppet-Muppets, 2003 - September 2006)
- Sensei to Watashi (Tomoko Ogasawara, 1998 - August 2004)
- Shataku na Seikatsu (Kahiro Okuya, November 2000 - January 2004)
- Shima Shima e Yōkoso (Wakako Nariyuki, 1998 - June 2003)
- Shiro to Arukeba (Kazuhiro Uchida, 1995–2001)
- Shopping no Joō (created by Usagi Nakamura, art by Akiko Morishima, December 2000 - December 2005)
- Sparrow's Hotel (Yuka Santō, 2008–2014)
- Super Shufu Tsukimi-san (Yoshito Usui, ? - May 2003)
- Tadaima! (Megumi Tanzawa, July 2007–2008)
- Taishō Maron (Yayoi Takamatsu, March 2003 - April 2005)
- Tagayashite Fall in Love (Hayako Gotō, April 2003 - September 2006)
- Tobidase Hyōryū Kazoku (Shunji Kosaka, May 2001 - July 2003)
- Tokimeki Couple (Mariko Kubota, ? - 1996)
- Tokimeki Momoiro High School (Chiharu Sasano, May 2002 - November 2006)
- Tōkon Kazoku (Akiko Yoshimoto, 1988–1996)
- Trouble Cafe! (Megumi Tanzawa, 1996 - September 2005)
- Uchi e Ikō yo! (Tomoko Ogasawara, March 2007 - April 2009)

== Columns ==
Listed alphabetically, with author and dates (if known).

- Nemoto Harumi no Natural Peace (Harumi Nemoto, October 2007)
