= MÄR =

Japanese manga series by Nobuyuki Anzai

- First tankōbon volume cover, featuring Ginta Toramizu (center), Babbo (bottom), and Dorothy (back)
- Genre: Adventure; Comedy; Supernatural
- Manga
- Written by: Nobuyuki Anzai
- Published by: Shogakukan
- English publisher: NA: Viz Media
- Imprint: Shōnen Sunday Comics
- Magazine: Weekly Shōnen Sunday
- Original run: January 7, 2003 – July 5, 2006
- Volumes: 15
- Anime television series
- Directed by: Masaharu Okuwaki (1–53); Keiichiro Kawaguchi (54–102)
- Produced by: Takeshi Sasamura; Shunji Aoki; Shin'ichi Iwata; Naohiko Furuichi
- Written by: Junki Takegami
- Music by: Daisuke Ikeda
- Studio: SynergySP
- Licensed by: NA: Viz Media
- Original network: TXN (TV Tokyo)
- English network: CA: YTV; US: Cartoon Network (Toonami)
- Original run: April 3, 2005 – March 25, 2007
- Episodes: 102
- Manga

MÄR Omega
- Written by: Nobuyuki Anzai
- Illustrated by: Kōichirō Hoshino
- Published by: Shogakukan
- Imprint: Shōnen Sunday Comics
- Magazine: Weekly Shōnen Sunday
- Original run: August 30, 2006 – June 13, 2007
- Volumes: 4
- icon

Märchen Awakens Romance, (Note: Märchen is German for "fairy tale".) officially abbreviated as MÄR, is a Japanese manga series written and illustrated by Nobuyuki Anzai, serialized in Shogakukan's shōnen manga magazine Weekly Shōnen Sunday from January 2003 to July 2006, with its chapters collected in 15 tankōbon volumes. The story follows 14-year-old junior high student Ginta Toramizu who is transported into a fantasy-based world known as MÄR-Heaven. As Ginta ventures in the world of MÄR-Heaven, he encounters allies and antagonists.

A 102-episode anime television series adaptation, titled in Japan as MÄR Heaven, was broadcast on TV Tokyo from April 2005 to March 2007.

In North America, Viz Media has licensed both the MÄR manga and anime for an English-language release. The manga was published between July 2005 and June 2007. The anime aired first in July 2006 on Toonami Jetstream, an online service from Cartoon Network, and then on the network itself, as part of the Toonami programming block in December 2006.

A manga sequel, MÄR Omega, written by Anzai and illustrated by Kōichirō Hoshino, was published in Weekly Shōnen Sunday from September 2006 to June 2007, with its chapters collected in four tankōbon volumes.

== Plot ==
Ginta Toramizu, a 14-year-old Tokyo junior high student with poor eyesight and a passion for fairy tales and video games, is unexpectedly transported to the fantastical world of MÄR Heaven. In this new realm, his physical limitations vanish, granting him enhanced strength and perfect vision. He encounters Dorothy, a 16-year-old witch who introduces him to magical artifacts called ÄRMs. Together they retrieve the sentient ÄRM Babbo, which Dorothy reluctantly gives to Ginta after deeming it too troublesome.

As Ginta explores MÄR Heaven with companions like farmer Jack, he discovers the world's darker aspects when targeted by thieves coveting Babbo. He later meets Alviss, who reveals having summoned Ginta using the Gate Keeper Clown ÄRM to combat the resurgent Chess Pieces organization. This group, led by King Orb and Queen Diana, previously attempted to conquer MÄR Heaven six years earlier. The narrative follows Ginta's growing involvement in the conflict against Chess Pieces while balancing his desire to return home.

=== MÄR Omega ===
Set six years after MÄR, the story follows Kai, adoptive son of an ÄRM smith, who dreams of wielding an ÄRM despite lacking magical ability. His inherited magic stone hints at lineage to Caldia, the sorcerer kingdom where all ÄRMs originate. When attacked by Chess Piece remnants, Kai discovers he can activate the sentient ÄRM Babbo, defying expectations. This draws attention from mysterious forces using "Fake ÄRMs"—magicless artifacts that drain users' life energy.

With allies Alviss and Elise, Kai travels to Caldia where the Grand Elder reveals Fake ÄRMs were created 300 years prior by dark magician Unwetter, whom Babbo (then Caldia's Elder) defeated at the cost of his life, transferring his soul into an ÄRM. When Fake ÄRM users assault Caldia, Kai awakens immense latent magic, proving his blood relation to Babbo. Joined by Inga, a descendant of Unwetter, the group embarks to recover Babbo's memory stones and confront the resurgent threat.

== Characters ==
Ginta Toramizu (虎水ギンタ, Toramizu Ginta)
Voiced by: Motoko Kumai (first voice), Kumiko Higa (second voice) (Japanese); Spike Spencer (English)
A second-year student who yearns for a fairy-tale world. Transported unexpectedly to MÄR Heaven, Ginta is an optimistic but impulsive boy who searches for a way home. After encountering the rare talking ÄRM Babbo, he journeys across MÄR Heaven and witnesses conflicts caused by the militant Chess Pieces. He forms Team MÄR with fellow travelers to oppose them, ultimately joining the War Games to confront their leader, Phantom.
Princess Snow (スノウ, Sunou))
Voiced by: Ai Shimizu (Japanese); Michelle Ruff (English)
Princess Snow, heir to Lestava in MÄR Heaven, is Koyuki's counterpart and Dorothy's step-niece. Her fragile appearance belies her fierce combat skills, known only to close allies. She fights using Ice ÄRM and develops strong feelings for Ginta. After fleeing her stepmother's assassination plot with Edward, she seals herself in ice, ordering him to return with a Fire ÄRM. Years later, Ginta melts the ice, freeing her, and their accidental kiss marks their first.
Babbo (バッボ)
Voiced by: Banjō Ginga (Japanese); Michael McConnohie (English)
A sentient, mustachioed ÄRM resembling a kendama, sealed inside a treasure chest. With no memory of his past, he joins Ginta to recover his identity. Capable of six transformations, he maintains a gentlemanly demeanor.
Alviss (アルヴィス, Aruvisu)
Voiced by: Sōichirō Hoshi (Japanese); Yuri Lowenthal (English)
A Cross Guard member who summoned Ginta to MÄR Heaven. Cursed with Zombie Tattoo by Phantom during the First MÄR Heaven War, he harbors intense hatred toward the Chess Pieces' commander while fighting alongside Team MÄR.
Jack (ジャック, Jakku)
Voiced by: Daisuke Sakaguchi (Japanese); Bryce Papenbrook (English)
A farmer from Badurika Island] who wields the earth-controlling Battle Shovel. After Ginta saves his crops from bandits, he joins the journey as Ginta's closest friend.
Dorothy (ドロシー, Doroshii)
Voiced by: Saki Nakajima (Japanese); Wendee Lee (English)
The 16-year-old princess of Caldea, a powerful witch and younger sister of Diana, the former princess. As Snow's step-aunt, she is bound by Caldea's laws to stop Diana's actions. A collector of rare ÄRM, she favors Guardian and Wind-types in battle. Her demeanor shifts between gentle and merciless, showing no hesitation in eliminating foes. She develops a strong infatuation with Ginta, often showering him with affection, which frustrates Snow.
Nanashi (ナナシ)
Voiced by: Masaya Onosaka (Japanese); Liam O'Brien (English)
The amnesiac leader of the Rubelia Thieves Guild, nicknamed "Nanashi" ("Nameless"). A flirtatious yet chivalrous fighter who wields lightning-based ÄRM such as Electric Eye.
Alan (アラン, Aran)
Voiced by: Jūrōta Kosugi (Japanese); Lex Lang (English)
Alan, a veteran of the previous MÄR-Heaven War, fought Halloween to a draw despite their former friendship. Cursed into Snow's guardian dog Edward, he required dangerous sleep cycles to transform until Ginta permanently separated them. This left him with a fear of cats.
Diana (ディアナ) / Queen (王妃, Ōhi)
Voiced by: Michiko Neya (Japanese); Tara Platt (English)
Diana, a noble witch from Caldia, trains her sister Dorothy in magic and creates dolls. Driven by greed, she betrays Caldia, freeing Phantom and stealing 798 magical ÄRMs, including Babbo. After becoming the Queen of Lestava, she gains Snow's affection while secretly leading the Chess Pieces as their Queen, granting Phantom immortality with a Zombie Tattoo. She manipulates events from the shadows, waging war to conquer both MÄR Heaven and Ginta's world. When she captures Snow to further her plans, Dorothy confronts and kills her, though Diana briefly regains her true self before dying.
Phantom (ファントム, Fantomu)
Voiced by: Mitsuki Saiga (Japanese); Derek Stephen Prince (English)
The undead commander of the Chess Pieces' elite Zodiac unit. Killed in the First MÄR Heaven War, he was resurrected through Zombie Tattoo, becoming a living corpse.

== Media ==
=== Manga ===
Written and illustrated by Nobuyuki Anzai, MÄR was serialized in Shogakukan's shōnen manga magazine Weekly Shōnen Sunday from January 7, 2003, to July 5, 2006. (Note: It finished in the magazine's 31st issue of 2006, released on July 5 of that same year.) Shogakukan collected its chapters in 15 tankōbon volumes released from May 17, 2003, to August 11, 2006.

In North America, the series was licensed for an English language release by Viz Media. The 15 volumes were released from May 3, 2005, to September 18, 2007.

A sequel titled MÄR Omega, written by Anzai and illustrated by Kōichirō Hoshino, was published in Weekly Shōnen Sunday from August 30, 2006, (Note: It started in the magazine's 39th issue of 2006, to June 13, 2007. released on August 30 of that same year.) (Note: It finished in the magazine's 28th issue of 2007, released on June 13 of that same year.) Its chapters were collected in four tankōbon volumes published from December 16, 2006, to August 10, 2007.

==== Volumes ====
===== MÄR =====
No.	Original release date	Original ISBN	English release date	English ISBN
01	May 17, 2003	978-4-09-126441-1	May 3, 2005	978-1-59116-902-4
001. "Knockin' on Heaven's Door"; 002. "Welcome"; 003. "Baboo"; 004. "Get"; 005. "True Gentleman" (紳士の真姿); 006. "Jack"; 007. "Be the Man"; 008. "No Fear"; 009. "Setting Off"
02	July 18, 2003	978-4-09-126442-8	July 5, 2005	978-1-59116-903-1
010. "Go to the Town"; 011. "Alviss"; 012. "Chess Soldiers" (チェスの兵隊（コマ）); 013. "I Bet"; 014. "Snow Princess (1) Sleeping Dog"; 015. "Snow Princess (2) Girl Within the Ice" (Snow Princess（2）氷の中の少女); 016. "Snow Princess (3) First Contact"; 017. "Snow Princess (4) Proclamation of War" (Snow Princess（4）宣戦布告); 018. "Snow Princess (5) The Other Edward" (Snow Princess（5）もう一人のエドワード); 019. "Snow Princess (6) Overlap"
03	October 18, 2003	978-4-09-126443-5	September 6, 2005	978-1-59116-904-8
020. "Be Stronger" (強くなる); 021. "Awaken the Power (1) Drill Gate"; 022. "Awaken the Power (2) Input Please"; 023. "Awaken the Power (3) Version 1" (Awaken the Power～力の覚醒～（3）バージョン1); 024. "Awaken the Power (4) Gate of Destruction" (Awaken the Power～力の覚醒～（4）割れずの門); 025. "Awaken the Power (5) Sixth Sense"; 026. "Awaken the Power (6) Awaken"; 027. "3 Days (180 Days)"; 028. "Waiting Man"; 029. "Ginta Vs Ian"; 030. "Training Complete"
04	January 1, 2004	978-4-09-126444-2	November 15, 2005	978-1-4215-0053-9
031. "MÄR"; 032. "Over the Sea"; 033. "Nanashi"; 034. "Fight in the Lake City (1) Broken Model"; 035. "Fight in the Lake City (2) Tom"; 036. "Fight in the Lake City (3) Nanashi's Strength"; 037. "Fight in the Lake City (4) Version 3"; 038. "Fight in the Lake City (5) Gargoyle"; 039. "Fight in the Lake City (6) Set Sail"; 040. "Announcement by Moonlight"; 041. "Test"
05	April 17, 2004	978-4-09-126445-9	January 17, 2006	978-1-4215-0190-1
042. "Seven Youths"; 043. "War Game, Commence"; 044. "Alviss Vs Leno"; 045. "Jack Vs Pano"; 046. "Ginta Vs Garon (1)"; 047. "Ginta Vs Garon (2)"; 048. "Dad"; 049. "Queen"; 050. "Snow Vs Fuugi (1)"; 051. "Snow Vs Fuugi (2)"; 052. "Nanashi Vs Loco"
06	June 18, 2004	978-4-09-126446-6	March 21, 2006	978-1-4215-0320-2
053. "Dorothy Vs Maira (1)"; 054. "Dorothy Vs Maira (2)"; 054. "Rolan"; 056. "Hope"; 057. "Delayed Man"; 058. "Ed Vs AliBaba"; 059. "Jack Vs Pano Rematch (1)"; 060. "Jack Vs Pano Rematch (2)"; 061. "Snow Vs Mr. Hook"; 062. "Ginta Vs Kanocchi (1)"; 063. "Ginta Vs Kanocchi (2)"
07	September 17, 2004	978-4-09-126449-7	May 16, 2006	978-1-4215-0491-9
"064. "Alviss Vs Rolan (1)"; "065. "Alviss Vs Rolan (2)"; "066. "Alviss Vs Rolan (3)"; "067. "Phantom's Madness"; "068. "Training Once More"; "069. "Shadow Battle"; "070. "Synchronisation"; "071. "The Battles Start"; "072. "Alviss Vs Mr. Hook (1)"; "073. "Alviss Vs Mr. Hook (2)"; "074. "Jack Vs Kollekkio (1)"
08	December 17, 2004	978-4-09-126448-0	July 18, 2006	978-1-4215-0490-2
075. "Jack vs. Kollekio (2)"; 076. "Jack vs. Kollekio (3)"; 077. "Dorothy Vs Avrute"; 078. "Nanashi Vs Aqua (1)"; 079. "Nanashi Vs Aqua (2)"; 080. "Nanashi Vs Aqua (3)"; 081. "Ginta Vs Girom (1)"; 082. "Ginta Vs Girom (2)"; 083. "Ginta Vs Girom (3)"; 084. "Dorothy Vs Rapunzel (1)"; 085. "Dorothy Vs Rapunzel (2)"
09	March 18, 2005	978-4-09-126449-7	September 19, 2006	978-1-4215-0491-9
086. "Dorothy Vs Rapunzel (3)"; 087. "To Caldia"; 088. "The Truth (1)"; 089. "The Truth (2)"; 090. "Unwelcomed Visitors"; 091. "Raging Battle"; 092. "Unforeseen Fight"; 093. "Babbo's Memories"; 094. "Night Before the 5th Battle"; 095. "Snow Vs Emokis (1)"; 096. "Snow Vs Emokis (2)"
10	June 16, 2005	978-4-09-126450-3	November 21, 2006	978-1-4215-0492-6
097. "Snow Vs Emokis (3)"; 098. "Alviss Vs Hamelin (1)"; 099. "Alviss Vs Hamelin (2)"; 100. "Jack Vs Candice (1)"; 101. "Jack Vs Candice (2)"; 102. "Jack Vs Candice (3)"; 103. "Ginta Vs Ash (1)"; 104. "Ginta Vs Ash (2)"; 105. "Ginta Vs Ash (3)"; 106. "Nanashi Vs Galian (1)"; 107. "Nanashi Vs Galian (2)"
11	September 16, 2005	978-4-09-127331-4	January 16, 2007	978-1-4215-0493-3
108. "Nanashi Vs Galian (3)"; 109. "The Zodiac's New Member"; 110. "Everyone's Break"; 111. "Alan Vs Chaton (1)"; 112. "Alan Vs Chaton (2)"; 113. "Alviss Vs Kouga (1)"; 114. "Alviss Vs Kouga (2)"; 115. "Alviss Vs Kouga (3)"; 116. "Dorothy Vs Pinocchio (1)"; 117. "Dorothy Vs Pinocchio (2)"; 118. "Dorothy Vs Pinocchio (3)"
12	December 15, 2005	978-4-09-127332-1	March 20, 2007	978-1-4215-0942-6
119. "Snow Vs Magical Roe (1)"; 120. "Snow Vs Magical Roe (2)"; 121. "Snow Vs Magical Roe (3)"; 122. "Ginta Vs Ian (1)"; 123. "Ginta Vs Ian (2)"; 124. "Ginta Vs Ian (3)"; 125. "The All Powerful Zodiac"; 126. "The Night Before the Final Battle"; 127. "The Final Battle Begins"; 128. "War Games Final Battle: Jack Vs Weasel (1)"; 129. "War Games Final Battle: Jack Vs Weasel (2)"
13	March 17, 2006	978-4-09-120125-6	May 15, 2007	978-1-4215-1154-2
130. "War Games Final Battle: Jack Vs Weasel (3)"; 131. "War Games Final Battle: Alviss Vs Rolan (1)"; 132. "War Games Final Battle: Alviss Vs Rolan (2)"; 133. "War Games Final Battle: Alviss Vs Rolan (3)"; 134. "War Games Final Battle: Dorothy Vs Chimera (1)"; 135. "War Games Final Battle: Dorothy Vs Chimera (2)"; 136. "War Games Final Battle: Dorothy Vs Chimera (3)"; 137. "War Games Final Battle: Dorothy Vs Chimera (4)"; 138. "War Games Final Battle: Alan Vs Halloween (1)"; 139. "War Games Final Battle: Alan Vs Halloween (2)"; 140. "War Games Final Battle: Alan Vs Halloween (3)"
14	June 16, 2006	978-4-09-120380-9	July 17, 2007	978-1-4215-1322-5
141. "War Games Final Battle: Nanashi Vs Peta (1)"; 142. "War Games Final Battle: Nanashi Vs Peta (2)"; 143. "War Games Final Battle: Nanashi Vs Peta (3)"; 144. "War Games Final Battle: Ginta Vs Phantom (1)"; 145. "War Games Final Battle: Ginta Vs Phantom (2)"; 146. "War Games Final Battle: Ginta Vs Phantom (3)"; 147. "War Games Final Battle: Ginta Vs Phantom (4)"; 148. "War Games Final Battle: Ginta Vs Phantom (5)"; 149. "War Games Final Battle: Ginta Vs Phantom (6)"; 150. "To Lestava Castle"; 151. "Chimera, Ian and Gido"
15	August 11, 2006	978-4-09-120575-9	September 18, 2007	978-1-4215-1403-1
152. "The Downfall of the Chess/The monster disappears (JP)"; 153. "Fate"; 154. "The Battle Between Sorceress Sisters"; 155. "Diana's Motive"; 156. "King"; 157. "The Battle Between Father and Son (1)"; 158. "The Battle Between Father and Son (2)"; 159. "The Battle Ends"; 160. "Peace"; Final Akt. "Märchen Awakens Romance"

===== MÄR Omega =====
No.	Release date	ISBN
1	December 16, 2006	978-4-09-120690-9
Ω1."Densetsu no ÄRM" (伝説のÄRM); Ω2."Eiyū no Gādian" (英雄のガーディアン); Ω3."Nisemono ÄRM" (偽物ÄRM); Ω4."Karudea no Koden" (カルデアの古伝); Ω5."Kai no Maka" (カイの魔カ); Ω6."Unvuettā no Shisha" (ウンヴェッターの使者); Ω7."Inga no Shukumei" (インガの宿命); Ω8."Babbo no Kioku" (バッボの記憶); Ω9."Ruberia no Tōzoku" (ルベリアの盜賊)
2	February 16, 2007	978-4-09-121019-7
3	May 18, 2007	978-4-09-121067-8
4	August 10, 2007	978-4-09-121159-0

=== Anime ===
A 102-episode anime television series adaptation, titled MÄR Heaven (メルヘヴン, Meru Hevun), produced by SynergySP, was broadcast on TV Tokyo from April 3, 2005, to March 25, 2007.

In North America, the anime was licensed by Viz Media and aired on Cartoon Network's online broadband service Toonami Jetstream in July 2006, and the series premiered on their television programming block Toonami, on December 23, 2006. It also premiered in Canada on YTV channel on June 1, 2007. Viz Media began releasing the series to DVD on June 12, 2007, with each disc containing 4 episodes. Four volumes were released before Viz delisted the series in favor of other titles. In June 2011, the first 52 episodes were available on Netflix's Instant streaming service.

=== Video games ===
Title	Console(s)	Release Date
MÄR Heaven: Knockin' on Heaven's Door (メルヘヴン Knockin' on Heaven's Door)	Game Boy Advance	JP: June 30, 2005
MÄR Heaven: Arm Fight Dream (メルヘヴン Ärm Fight Dream)	PlayStation 2	JP: November 3, 2005
MÄR Heaven: Karudea no Akuma (メルヘヴン カルデアの悪魔; 'MÄR Heaven: Devil of Karudea')	Nintendo DS	JP: March 30, 2006
MÄR Heaven: Boukyaku no Clavier (メルヘヴン 忘却のクラヴィーア; 'MÄR Heaven: Oblivion of Clavier')	Nintendo DS	JP: September 7, 2006
