= Mixim 11 =

Japanese manga series

- Cover of the first volume
- Manga
- Written by: Nobuyuki Anzai
- Published by: Shogakukan
- Imprint: Shōnen Sunday Comics
- Magazine: Weekly Shōnen Sunday
- Original run: April 23, 2008 – February 2, 2011
- Volumes: 12
- icon

Mixim 11 (stylized as MIXIM★11) is a Japanese manga series written and illustrated by Nobuyuki Anzai. It was serialized in Shogakukan's Weekly Shōnen Sunday from April 2008 to February 2011, with its chapters collected in twelve tankōbon volumes.

== Synopsis ==
Ichimatsu Matsuri, Takezō Sangubashi, and Kōme Haruno are three high school students who all seem to have zero luck with girls. One day, a messenger named Karmina reveals that one of them is the prince of the star Polaris. The prince was given a spell at birth that ensures he will never be loved by women, preventing him from assimilating into society on Earth. However, twelve girls named after constellations are immune to the spell. The three students must figure out who the prince is so he can marry one of the girls and take the throne, preventing Polaris's light from going out.

== Publication ==
Written and illustrated by Nobuyuki Anzai, Mixim 11 started in Shogakukan's Weekly Shōnen Sunday on April 23, 2008. It was initially titled Mixim 12 (stylized MIXIM♀12), but its title was changed midway through serialization. The series finished on February 2, 2011. Shogakukan collected its chapters in twelve tankōbon volumes, released from October 17, 2008, to April 18, 2011.
