= Kobo, the Li'l Rascal =

Japanese manga series

コボちゃん (Kobo-chan)
- Genre: Comedy, slice of life
- Manga
- Written by: Masashi Ueda
- Published by: Soyosha (strip); Houbunsha (current volumes)
- English publisher: NA: Kodansha America
- Magazine: Yomiuri Shimbun
- Original run: April 1, 1982 – present
- Volumes: 60 (Soyosha); 59 (Houbunsha)
- Anime television series
- Directed by: Hiromitsu Morita
- Produced by: Michihiko Suwa (Yomiuri TV); Tatsuo Ono (Senkosha)
- Music by: Tōru Fuyuki; Akira Nakajima; Hayato Kanbayashi
- Studio: Eiken (Note: Animation production assistance (アニメーション制作協力) for all episodes provided by Marchen-sha.)
- Licensed by: Crunchyroll (expired)
- Original network: NNS (YTV, NTV)
- Original run: October 19, 1992 – March 21, 1994
- Episodes: 63

Kobo, the Li'l Rascal (コボちゃん, Kobo-chan), is a manga created by Masashi Ueda. Kodansha published three volumes of the manga as a bilingual Japanese-English editions, and Kodansha America distributed the book in the United States.

Kobo-chan began publication in the newspaper Yomiuri Shimbun on April 1, 1982. Beginning in December of that year, Soyosha published the series in book form. Yomiuri TV began airing the Kobo-chan strip on television on September 15, 1990. The weekly anime series ran on said channel from October 19, 1992, to March 21, 1994. Yomiuri had published 6,000 Kobo-chan strips by March 1999. Soyosha published Volume 60 on October 22, 2003. Houbunsha began publishing volumes on May 6, 2004. Its most recently volume, the 59th, was published on November 7, 2025.

The anime used to be available subtitled on Crunchyroll.

== Characters ==
- Kobo Tabata (田畑 小穂, Tabata Kobo; Kobo コボちゃん Kobo-chan) - The namesake of the series.
- Sanae Yamakawa (田畑 早苗, Yamakawa Sanae) - Kobo's mother.
- Koji Tabata (田畑 耕二, Tabata Kōji) - Kobo's father, Takeo's cousin-in-law, Iwao and Mine's son-in-law
- Miho Tabata (田畑 美穂, Tabata Miho) - Kobo's younger sister
- Iwao Yamakawa (山川 岩夫, Yamakawa Iwao) - Kobo's maternal grandfather, Takeo's maternal uncle, Koji's father-in-law, and Sanae's father
- Mine Yamakawa (山川 ミネ, Yamakawa Mine) - Kobo's maternal grandmother, Koji's mother-in-law, and Sanae's mother
- Takeo Omori (大森 竹男, Ōmori Takeo; タケオ Takeo) - Takeo is Iwao's nephew, Sanae's cousin, and Koji's cousin-in-law
- Sakiko Omori (大森 咲子, Ōmori Sakiko) - Takeo's wife, Iwao's niece-in-law, and Sanae's cousin-in-law
- Pochi (ポチ) - family dog
- Mi (ミー) - family cat
