= Harumi Nemoto =

Japanese model (born 1980)

- Born: July 28, 1980 (age 44); Chiba Prefecture, Japan
- Height: 1.66 m (5 ft 5 in)

Harumi Nemoto (根本 はるみ, Nemoto Harumi, born July 28, 1980) is a Japanese gravure (bikini) idol from Chiba Prefecture, Japan. She has had a column since October 2007 in the monthly manga magazine Manga Life.

== Biography ==
Two years after her last DVD, X-body, Harumi released the DVD called Surf Girl. She told the press at the DVD event that she intended to keep modeling.

== Sources ==
- 根本はるみ :: Harumi Nemoto Profile at yellow-cab.co.jp (Japanese)
- 根本はるみ (Nemoto Harumi) Filmography at JMDB (Japanese)
- 根本 はるみ - Nemoto Harumi Profile at Web I-dic (Japanese)
- "Harumi Nemoto". hinaningyo. 2008-11-15. Archived from the original on 10 November 2008.
