= Takeshobo =

Japanese publishing company

Takeshobo Co., Ltd.
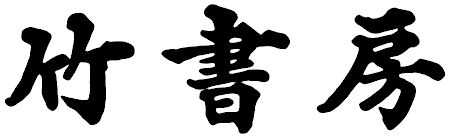
- Native name: 株式会社竹書房
- Romanized name: Kabushiki-gaisha Takeshobo
- Type: Private KK
- Industry: Publishing
- Founded: October 1972
- Founder: Kyōichirō Noguchi
- Headquarters: Sanbanchō, Chiyoda, Tokyo, Japan
- Products: Books, magazines, manga, DVD
- Revenue: JPY 15,000,000,000 (2011)
- Website: www.takeshobo.co.jp

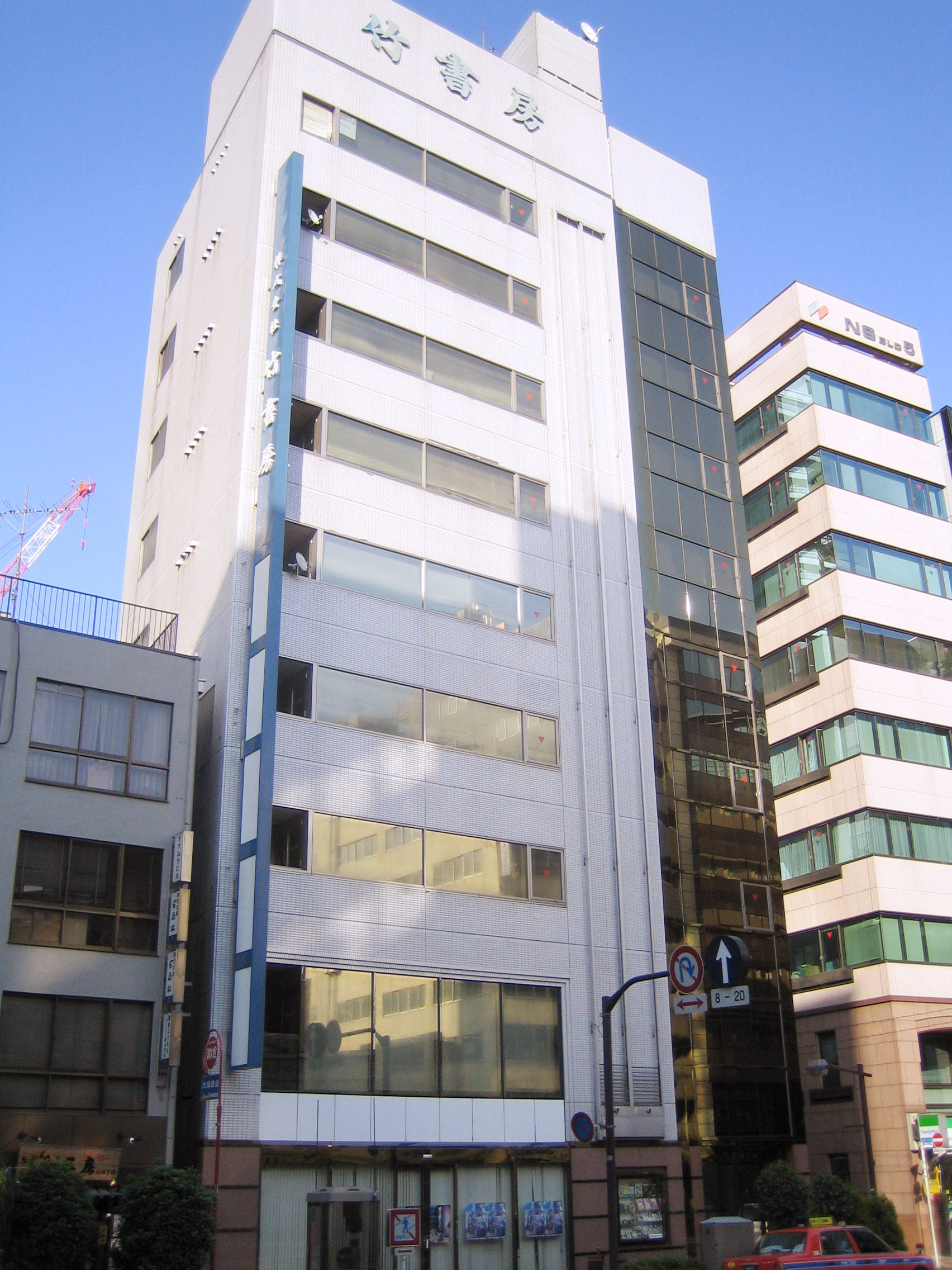
Takeshobo Building at Iidabashi 2-7-3, Chiyoda, Tokyo.

Takeshobo Co., Ltd. (株式会社竹書房, Kabushiki-gaisha Takeshobō) is a major publisher in Japan.

Takeshobo was founded in 1972 by Kyōichirō Noguchi, starting Japan's first Mahjong magazine Monthly Mahjong Magazine (月刊近代麻雀, Gekkan Kindai Mājan). Other magazines, such as a magazine dedicated to mahjong-themed manga, as well as a magazine dedicated to yonkoma manga, were published. Furthermore, a mahjong museum was founded. Currently, in addition to the older magazines, a pachinko magazine, a gravure magazine, short stories as well as adult literature novels are published. On the Internet, it has distribution agreements with Livedoor. Takeshobo yonkoma comics are distributed on the comic distribution website Manga Life Win. Excluding mahjong manga, manga series are published under the Bamboo Comics label.

== Magazines ==
Magazine	Period
Ai no taiken Special DX (愛の体験スペシャルDX)	monthly
Comic Marble (コミックマーブル)	
Doki! (Dokiッ!)	monthly
Doki! Special (Dokiッ!スペシャル)	monthly
Gekiman Special (劇漫スペシャル)	monthly
Gokinjo Scandal (ご近所スキャンダル)	monthly
Hontō ni Atta Gyōten Scoop Manga Zukyun! (本当にあった仰天スクープまんがズキュン!)	monthly
Hontō ni Atta Yukai na Hanashi (本当にあったゆかいな話)	monthly
Jitsuwa Document (実話ドキュメント)	monthly
Kaizoku No. 1 (海賊No.1)	monthly
Kindai Mahjong (近代麻雀)	semimonthly
Kindai Mahjong Original (近代麻雀オリジナル)	monthly
Manga Club (まんがくらぶ)	monthly
Manga Club Original (まんがくらぶオリジナル)	monthly
Manga Life (まんがライフ)	monthly
Manga Life Momo (まんがライフMOMO)	monthly
Manga Life Original (まんがライフオリジナル)	monthly
Manga Life Selection (まんがライフセレクション)	irregular
Manga Pachinko 777 (漫画パチンコ777)	monthly
Men's Street (メンズストリート)	monthly
Namaiki! (Namaikiッ!)	monthly
Pachi-slo Land (パチスロランド)	monthly
Pachinko Land (パチンコランド)	monthly
Reijin (麗人)	bimonthly
Ren'ai Tengoku Paradise (恋愛天国パラダイス)	monthly
Suku Suku Paradise (すくすくパラダイス)	
Super Pachi-slo 777 (スーパーパチスロ777)	monthly
Tokkan Kaientai (特冊快援隊)	monthly
Tokkan Shinsengumi DX (特冊新鮮組DX)	monthly
Vitaman (ビタマン)	monthly
Woman Gekijō (ウーマン劇場)	monthly
Zōkan Tokkan Shinsengumi DX (増刊特冊新鮮組DX)	monthly
