= Dorami-chan: Wow, The Kid Gang of Bandits! =

1991 film by Keiichi Hara

- Theatrical release poster
- Kanji: ドラミちゃん アララ・少年山賊団!
- Revised Hepburn: Dorami-chan Arara Shōnen Sanzoku-dan!
- Directed by: Keiichi Hara
- Screenplay by: Miho Maruo
- Based on: Doraemon by Fujiko F. Fujio
- Produced by: Sōichi Besshi; Hitoshi Mogi; Jun'ichi Kimura; Yoshiaki Koizumi
- Starring: Keiko Yokozawa; Noriko Ohara; Kazuya Tatekabe; Michiko Nomura; Kaneta Kimotsuki
- Edited by: Hajime Okayasu; Toshihiko Kojima; Yumiko Nakaba; Hideaki Murai; Akikiro Kawasaki
- Music by: Kohei Tanaka
- Production company: Shin-Ei Animation
- Distributed by: Toho
- Release date: March 9, 1991 (Japan)
- Running time: 40 minutes
- Country: Japan
- Language: Japanese
- Box office: $28.0 million

Dorami-chan: Wow, The Kid Gang of Bandits! (ドラミちゃん アララ・少年山賊団!, Dorami-chan Arara Shōnen Sanzoku-dan!) is a 1991 Japanese animated science fiction comedy-drama short film.

It premiered in Japan on March 9, 1991 on a double feature with Doraemon: Nobita's Dorabian Nights and is the second Dorami-chan short film.

The short received the Best Gold Prize Award at the 9th Golden Gross Award the same year alongside Doraemon: Nobita's Dorabian Nights.

The film's tagline is "What?! Nobita's ancestors were a gang of young bandits?!" (エッ!!のび太君のご先祖様が少年山賊団?!)

== Plot ==
In the 22nd century, Dorami heads over to the train station and rides a train to Sewashi's house as it begins raining outside.

At his house, Sewashi reviews his great-great-grandfather Nobita's life moments before Dorami enters to prepare food. He mentions sending an investigation robot, Arara, to assess his ancestors, revealing that his ancestor Nobihei from the Sengoku period is underperforming similarly to Nobita. Concerned for Nobihei after Arara reports his troubles and capture by bandits, Dorami offers to help him, with Sewashi hoping that improving his performance will also aid his own failing grades and allowance. Dorami takes Arara and departs for the Sengoku period while Sewashi sits down to eat.

Dorami and Arara arrive in the Sengoku period, noticing changes since Arara last showed them Nobihei's status. They meet Oshizu, who resembles Dorami's friend Shizuka, and inquire about Nobihei. Oshizu, his best friend, hasn't seen him recently and explains that poor crop growth and food shortages have led people to leave the village. She mentions that children are working hard and points in the direction of where the bandits who took Nobihei are. Concerned for Nobihei, Oshizu asks to join Dorami and Arara on their journey.

Once at the bandits' location, Dorami and Oshizu call for Nobihei. The bandits, known as the Skull Gang, emerge, demanding their belongings. Oshizu identifies Nobihei among them and questions his alliance. He apologizes, claiming she is mistaken. As the gang attempts to attack, Dorami easily defeats them using her gadgets. Oshizu recognizes the other gang members as village children: Takezō, Goro, Chibisuke, and Genta. The village children had chose to run away, bored by their hard lives, choosing banditry for excitement. Oshizu tells them that their parents are worried, but Nobihei dismisses her, claiming his mother nags him. Takezō insists they made a promise to become the best bandit group. Dorami expresses disappointment but suddenly proposes joining them. Takezō is hesitant but flattered by her skills, while Nobihei supports her joining, claiming she’s more reliable than Takezō. Eventually, Takezō allows her in, and the Skull Gang decides to show Dorami their secret base. On their way over to the secret base, they pause to show the view they have through the pathway allowing those to admire the homeland. Dorami spots the estate of Lord Honekawa, who the Skull Gang explains is the overseer of the land and hoards the rice they grew. They also bring up the lord's son Sunemaru, whom they used to play with as little kids together, before heading to the base.

Once at the secret base, Oshizu notes the water supply, while Dorami sees their grown vegetables. Takezō emphasizes their freedom and teamwork, but Nobihei mentions their failure to catch anything, leading to his reprimand by the other Skull Gang members. Takezō offers to show Dorami, Arara, and Oshizu their cave, which Dorami finds dirty. She cleans it with a gadget, and the Skull Gang enjoys their new bed before falling asleep. Oshizu leaves, promising not to inform their parents. Nobihei carries water at night with Dorami's help and expresses concern about their rice supply. He is unsure if the Skull Gang wishes to return home and admits he feels conflicted about his own situation. Dorami questions Lord Honekawa's neglect of the villagers, with Nobihei bringing up how he's been rising rice taxes. She gives Nobihei a pair of glasses, the "Source of Courage" as she calls them, which enables him to finally see, leaving him amazed.

The next morning, Lord and Lady Honekawa evaluate their rice supply, with Lord Honekawa wishing for more villagers' efforts and Lady Honekawa suggesting they could raise rice taxes. Meanwhile, at the Skull Gang's base, Dorami proposes a break-in at Lord Honekawa's rice storage. Hesitant at first, Nobihei steps up and convinces Takezō to join in, and Arara notes Nobihei's newfound bravery, attributed by Dorami to his improved foresight. At Lord Honekawa's estate, Sunemaru eagerly asks his parents to play Karuta, but they must leave for a wedding in the next town, leaving him disappointed as the handmaidens inquire him about his meal preference, with Oshizu watching nearby. Takezō informs the Skull Gang that Lord Honekawa has left his estate, allowing Nobihei, Dorami, Arara, and himself to enter. Inside, Sunemaru throws a tantrum about his food, while the handmaidens are confused and Oshizu is worried. The group uses Takecopters to access the rice storage but is spotted by guards. Dorami uses a Farewell To-rch gadget to transform the guards' swords into vegetables, prompting their retreat. Arara cuts the rice storage lock, and Dorami instructs Nobihei to use a Magic Mallet to shrink the rice bales. Sunemaru sneaks up but is also shrunk and inadvertently collected with the rice as they escape. Nobihei reverts the shrinking on the rice bales, revealing Sunemaru, who fears for what he perceives as his own family's rice. While the Skull Gang enjoys rice and grilled fish, Takezō offers Sunemaru some grilled fish, but he refuses, asserting he won't eat anything from strangers, angering Takezō. Dorami suggests they prepare fields after eating and uses a Mr. Bumper Crop gadget to create a planting area. Dorami then encourages Sunemaru to join, but Sunemaru declines, fearing his clothes will get dirty. Takezō forcibly removes his clothing and he joins the others in scattering seeds. Plants flourish but soon wilt under the sun. Dorami reassures Nobihei that they can create rain using the Mr. Bumper Crop. Takezō offers to let he and the Skull Gang members handle harvesting without gadgets, which during the process, impresses Sunemaru, who retrieves several plants he helped grow. They transport their crops back to the Skull Gang's base, where Nobihei gives Sunemaru a tomato from Takezō. Sunemaru briefly faints but is just asleep. Oshizu arrives, worried about Sunemaru's absence, and Nobihei notices her beauty through his glasses for the first time. Lord and Lady Honekawa returned to find their rice stolen and learn from one of their guards that their son was taken by a band of kid bandits who live at the mountain pass. That night, everyone, except for Dorami, is asleep in the Skull Gang's cave, with Dorami left gazing in silence.

The next day, Dorami, flying using a Takecopter, sees Lord Honekawa and his guards approaching the Skull Gang and alerts the base. Sunemaru protests confronting his father, but Goro, Genta, and Takezō remind him of past sufferings before they leave. Dorami tells Oshizu stay behind with Sunemaru before leaving as well. As Honekawa's group approaches a scarecrow, Arara surprises them, with a net capturing the guards and prompting the Skull Gang to attack by throwing rocks. One of the rocks hits Honekawa's horse, throwing him to the ground. Hearing this, Sunemaru rushes out as Honekawa's guards flee. Nobihei charges at Honekawa on the Mr. Bumper Crop. Sunemaru steps in to protect his father, causing Nobihei to stop and accidentally disrupt the control panel, sending Mr. Bumper Crop rampaging through the trees. After rampaging more, the Mr. Bumper Crop starts to create a massive rain cloud that looms over everything. Lord Honekawa corners Dorami, the Skull Gang, and Oshizu, while Takezō aims his crossbow at them. As the rain falls, Sunemaru decides to confront his father, intervening between him and the Skull Gang to plead for peace. As the area floods, Sunemaru uses the Mr. Bumper Crop to save Lord Honekawa. Dorami deploys a Sunshine Coat gadget to disperse the rain as villagers flee. Amid the chaos, Sunemaru and his father are nearly swept away, but Nobihei and Arara, alongside the Skull Gang, come to their rescue. Nobihei throws a rope to help Sunemaru and Lord Honekawa escape just in time as the tree they cling to slips off the cliff. Lord Honekawa unexpectedly breaks down in tears. Dorami, watching in secret, calls for Arara, and they leave to return to the 22nd century, flying away with Takecopters while Oshizu watches them depart. Lord Honekawa expresses remorse, returning all of the rice to the villagers and promising to lower the rice taxes. In the village, the legend of Dorami endured, with teru teru bōzu dolls in her shape left out whenever it rained.

Back in the 22nd century, Sewashi observes that Dorami and Arara's adventure had no effect on Nobihei and Nobita's assessment results. Arara explains that the graph reflects athletic ability, making it worthless. Exhausted, they notice smoke coming from the kitchen, where Dorami is baking grilled fish and offers to prepare Sewashi a remarkable picnic lunch for tomorrow.

== Cast ==
Character	Japanese voice actor
Dorami	Keiko Yokozawa
Arara	Keiko Yamamoto
Sewashi	Yoshiko Ōta
Nobihei	Noriko Ohara
Takezō	Kazuya Tatekabe
Goro	Toshiharu Sakurai
Chibisuke	Tomohiro Nishimura
Genta	Kiyonobu Suzuki
Oshizu	Michiko Nomura
Sunemaru Honekawa	Kaneta Kimotsuki
Nobihei's mother	Sachiko Chijimatsu
Nobihei's father	Masayuki Katō
Takezō's mother	Kazuyo Aoki
Genta's father	Takashi Taguchi
Goro's mother	Chizuru Yamamoto
Chibisuke's father	Takumi Yamazaki
Villagers	Hiroshi Naka; Naoki Makishima
Lord Honekawa (Sunemaru's father)	Osamu Katō
Lady Honekawa (Sunemaru's mother)	Yoshino Ōtori
Handmaidens	Junko Asami; Midori Nakasawa

== Soundtrack ==
=== Theme song ===
"Hello! Dorami-chan" (ハロー!ドラミちゃん)
Lyrics: Yumi Yoshimoto / Composition: Shunsuke Kikuchi / Arrangement: Shunsuke Kikuchi / Vocals: Satoko Yamano

== Release ==
The short was released theatrically in Japan on March 9, 1991 alongside Doraemon: Nobita's Dorabian Nights on a double feature.

=== Streaming ===
In 2024, for the occasion of the 90th anniversary of Fujiko F. Fujio, Dorami-chan: Wow, The Kid Gang of Bandits! alongside numerous animated short films of Doraemon, Perman, Esper Mami, and Chimpui were made available to stream on Prime Video in Japan as the "Fujiko F. Fujio's 90th Anniversary Film Masterpiece Selection".

== Awards ==
Award	Year	Category	Recipient	Result	Ref.
9th Golden Gross Award	1991	Best Gold Award	Doraemon: Nobita's Dorabian Nights; Dorami-chan: Wow, The Kid Gang of Bandits!	Won	
