= Michiko Nomura =

Japanese actress (born 1938)

- 野村 道子
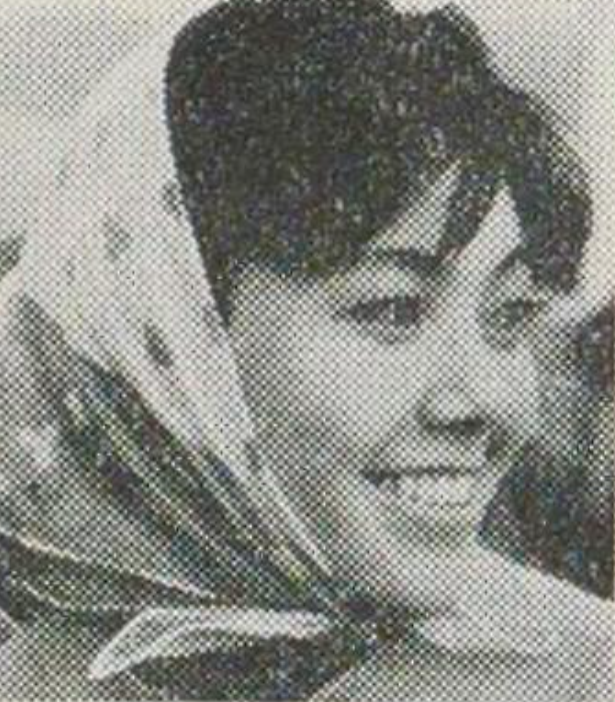
- Nomura in 1962
- Born: Michiko Utsumi (内海 道子) (née Michiko Nomura (野村 道子)); March 31, 1938 (age 88); Yokohama, Japan
- Other names: Mitchie (ミッチィ); Micchan (みっちゃん)
- Occupations: Actress; voice actress; sōdanyaku
- Years active: 1958–present
- Agent: Ken Production
- Notable credit(s): Doraemon as Shizuka Minamoto; Maya the Honey Bee as Maya the Bee; Sazae-san as Wakame Isono
- Spouse: Kenji Utsumi (m. 1973; died 2013)
- Children: 1

Michiko Nomura (野村 道子, Nomura Michiko; born March 31, 1938 in Yokohama, Kanagawa) is a Japanese actress, voice actress, and sōdanyaku.

She is best known for her roles as Shizuka Minamoto in Doraemon, Maya the Bee in The Adventures of Maya the Bee, and Wakame Isono in Sazae-san.

== Biography ==
=== Early life ===
Nomura was born in Yokohama, Kanagawa Prefecture on March 31, 1938. She was adopted by relatives living in Osaka Prefecture when she was two years old.

As the war intensified, Nomura and her family evacuated over to Gifu Prefecture. Once the war came to an end, she returned back home. Because she was the only one with a different surname, she thought her younger siblings were merely relatives.

From an early age, Nomura loved radio dramas and wanted to pursue a career in radio dramas and voice acting. During her time at Kanagawa Gakuen Junior and Senior High School, she joined their drama club, with her coaches being Yoshiya Nemoto and Naoki Sugiura.

In her third year of high school, Nomura applied for a theater company established by the Tokyo Announcement Academy, but was rejected due to her young age, though got heavily encouraged to join the acting training department, so started attending the academy's acting department every Sunday.

Once Nomura graduated from training school, she appeared on programs by the producer who instructed her. At the beginning of her career, she usually worked as an actress on commercials and TV dramas. Initially, when she was in her early twenities, she passed the Fuji TV weathercaster audition and became their first weather girl, but since the weather forecast was done every morning, she was unable to make time to film for live-action dramas, and her voice acting jobs grew. She officially began working in the voice acting industry three to four years after she started her career in acting. By her early twenties, Nomura would often show her face, and since the weather forecast ended at 8:00 am, she was able to do other work like dubbing songs used in commercials, acting in television commercials, and dubbing for foreign films afterwards.

=== Personal life ===
In 1973, Nomura married Kenji Utsumi. She met Utsumi while on Speed Racer and their wedding ceremony took place at a white church in Hawaii, USA, with Tadashi Nakamura and his wife serving as their matchmakers. They were married for nearly 40 years until his death in 2013.

=== Appearing in popular anime ===
In 1976, Nomura was selected to replace Yoshiko Yamamoto as the voice of Wakame Isono in Sazae-san, and in 1978, Nomura was cast to voice Nobita's love interest and closest friend Shizuka Minamoto in Doraemon, which premiered in April the following year. Both Wakame and Shizuka were well known characters, so Nomura's voice became widely known with Japanese audiences.

In regards to voicing both iconic characters, she once said, "Wakame-chan in "Sazae-san" was a difficult role. If you make it too much, it will stand out, and if you only act naturally, it won't sound childish, so you also need to be cute. The more I did it, the more difficult it felt. I wonder if Shizuka's voice was a good match. It was a role I was good at, so it was easy to play, and I was able to really dig deep and show various sides. Someone was surprised the other day and asked me "Wakame-chan and Shizuka-chan were the same voice actor?" As a voice actor, I was like, "I did it!""

After Nomura had previously worked with the Sannoh Theatre Company, Kindai Gekijo Theatre Company, Tokyo Actor's Consumer's Cooperative Society, T.A.P. and Aoni Production, she joined her husband's company Ken Production in 1984 in order to help operations. At the time, there were only seven people in the company and they were called the "Seven Samurai".

In 2005, Nomura decided to step down from the role of Wakame on Sazae-san in order to focus on production work. Around the same time, she also stepped down from the role of Shizuka on Doraemon due to the anime's transition to a reboot with a new voice cast. She was succeeded by Makoto Tsumura in Sazae-san and Yumi Kakazu in Doraemon that same year.

=== Current activity ===
In 2005, she received the Rikiya Tayama Award at the 14th Japan Movie Critics Awards along her Doraemon co-stars Nobuyo Ōyama, Noriko Ohara, Kazuya Tatekabe, and Kaneta Kimotsuki. In November 2006, they received a Special Award at the 11th Animation Kobe and in March 2007, they received the 3rd Achievement Award at the Tokyo International Anime Fair 2007.

In 2009, Nomura voiced the Disemboweled Tiger in Kämpfer, her first anime voice acting role in four years since leaving Doraemon and Sazae-san. In the first episode, Nomura herself appears in a magazine alongside co-star Yukari Tamura and in the eleventh episode, she co-stars alongside her husband Kenji Utsumi as a married couple for the first time in years.

In 2016, she received the Merit Award at the 10th Seiyu Awards alongside Sachiko Chijimatsu and Tadashi Nakamura.

In 2023, she received the Commissioner for Cultural Affairs' Award.

== Personality ==
=== Features and episodes ===
Her voice range is mezzo-soprano.

In her early twenties, Nomura was mostly hired to voice child characters, as the idea was that someone her age at that time could voice children. When she started voice acting, she was often cast to voice young characters. She voiced boy characters in shows such as the first series of Perman and Serendipity the Pink Dragon, but after that started voicing girl characters more often. Nomura admitted that she preferred voicing young boys, as she felt like young girl roles weren't that interesting to her.

Nomura was often cast in quiet character roles, the worst of which was her role in the first Babel II film, in which behind the scenes she was told that she had no real talent.

During her time voicing Shizuka on Doraemon, Nomura felt a sense of tension and tried to stay young so that Shizuka wouldn't sound old. In the Doraemon manga, Shizuka referred to Nobita as either "You" (あんた), "Nobi-chan" (のびちゃん), or "Nobita-kun" (のび太君) interchangeably, but Nomura decided to have Shizuka refer to him as "Nobita-san" (のび太さん) in the anime. (Note: Nomura didn't have Shizuka refer to Nobita as "Nobita-san" consistently from the beginning, as she had Shizuka refer to Nobita as "Nobita-kun" in early 1979 anime episodes and the first three Doraemon movies Doraemon: Nobita's Dinosaur, Doraemon: The Record of Nobita's Spaceblazer, and Doraemon: Nobita and the Haunts of Evil. It wasn't until Doraemon: Nobita and the Castle of the Undersea Devil that Shizuka starts refer to Nobita as "Nobita-san" in the movie series.) In response, the manga unified to have Shizuka refer to Nobita as "Nobita-san" as a reverse import from the anime, and has been kept as part of Shizuka's character in the 2005 anime.

In a post-recording interview for Kämpfer, she said that when she was initially offered to voice for the show, she accepted because she was a fan of the team.

=== Personal life ===
Nomura's hobbies are dancing, tai chi, aerobics, and wearing kimonos. She is a fan of the Hanshin Tigers.

Her husband was Kenji Utsumi, who was also a voice actor and the former CEO of Ken Production. They have a son.

Since she left the Doraemon franchise alongside the other voice actors in 2005, Kazuya Tatekabe, who voiced Gian, died in June 2015, Kaneta Kimotsuki, who voiced Suneo, died in October 2016, and Noriko Ohara, who voiced Nobita, died in July 2024. After Nobuyo Ōyama, who voiced Doraemon, died in September 2024, Nomura is currently the last surviving main cast member of the 1979 to 2005 Doraemon television anime series.

Nomura was close friends with Ōyama and Ohara, going on overseas trips together during their time on the Doraemon anime.

== Filmography ==
=== Television animation ===
List of voice performances in television animation
Year	Title	Role	Notes	Source
1963	Astro Boy	Additional voice		
1964–65	Wolf Boy Ken	Additional voice		
1965	Uchuu Patrol Hopper	Additional voice		
1965	Jungle Emperor Leo	Additional voice		
1966	Osomatsu-kun	Additional voice		
1967	Rainbow Sentai Robin	Mirona	Ep. 47	
1967–68	Perman	Sabu		
1967	Mach GoGoGo	Mitchi Shimura	Third voice, Ep. 5 and onward	
1967	The Golden Bat	Additional voice	Ep. 23	
1967–68	Sally the Witch	Ruriko, Zuppe	Ruriko in Ep. 49	
1968	The Monster Kid	Additional voice		
1968	Cyborg 009	Additional voice	Ep. 25	
1968	Humanoid Monster Bem	Emily, Anna	Emily in Ep. 3, Anna in Ep. 13	
1968	Sabu and Ichi's Detective Memoirs	Daughter	Ep. 8	
1969	Ninpu Kamui Gaiden	Nami		
1969	Dororo	Sayō	Ep. 18	
1970	Star of the Giants	Additional voice		
1970	The Genie Family	Sakura, Yuriko Hoshi		
1970	Mōretsu Atarō	Additional voice		
1970	Undersea Boy Marine	Nurse		
1970	Bokuhatsu Taishō	Additional voice		
1970	Attack No. 1	Yumiko Mihara, Katsura Yagisawa	Second voice of Katsura Yagisawa	
1970	Kick no Oni	Etsuko		
1971	Tiger Mask	Ruriko Wakatsuki, Additional voice	Second voice of Ruriko Wakatsuki	
1971	Andersen Monogatari	Ilze, Gerda	Ilze in Ep. 24, Gerda in Eps. 50–51	
1971	New Little Ghost Q-Tarō	Yoshiko Koizumi		
1971	Marvelous Melmo	Additional voice		
1971–72	Sarutobi Ecchan	Etsuko Sarutobi	Lead role	
1971	Kunimatsu-sama no Otōridai	Chizuru, Akiko		
1971	GeGeGe no Kitarō	Additional voice		
1972	Mahōtsukai Chappy	Chappy	Substitute voice for Eiko Masuyama in Ep. 9	
1972	Devilman	Rita, Iyamon, Miyo	Rita in Ep. 5, Iyamon in Ep. 8	
1972–2005	Sazae-san	Kaori Ozora, Wakame Isono	Second voice of Wakame Isono	
1973	Babel II	Yumiko Furumi		
1973	Demetan Croaker, The Boy Frog	Girl		
1973	Doraemon	Additional voice		
1973	Mazinger Z	Yuri	Ep. 23	
1973	Microid S	Ruriko Ōzeki, Taro Naoki, Kankuro	Kankuro in Ep. 18	
1973	Zero Tester	Additional voice		
1973	Bōken Korobokkuru	Additional voice		
1973–74	Aim for the Ace!	Additional voice		
1973	Dororon Enma-kun	Additional voice		
1974	The New Adventures of Hutch the Honeybee	Aya		
1974–75	Calimero	Priscilla	First voice	
1975–76	Maya the Honey Bee	Maya the Bee	Lead role	
1975	Megu the Little Witch	Lily	Ep. 56	
1975	Ikkyū-san	Sleeve		
1975	Steel Jeeg	Chirara		
1976	Candy Candy	Daisy		
1976	Balatack	Miyo	Ep. 4	
1976	Magne Robo Gakeen	Sayuri		
1977	Jetter Mars	Agnes Vodka		
1977	Rascal the Raccoon	Ritchi		
1978	Ore wa Teppei	Additional voice		
1978	Angie Girl	Donto Fujin		
1978	Space Pirate Captain Harlock	Saki Katagiri	Ep. 16	
1978	The Adventures of the Little Prince	Doruru		
1978	Majokko Tickle	Kotaro's mother		
1978	Pink Lady Monogatari: Eikō no Tenshitachi	Mie		
1979–2005	Doraemon	Shizuka Minamoto	Main role	
1979–80	Galaxy Express 999	Rēde, Mia, Nami, Daughter		
1980	King Arthur	Eleanor	Ep. 22	
1980	Lalabel, the Magical Girl	Additional voice		
1980	Manga Kotowaza Jiten	Toki		
1982	Asari-chan	Ibara Yabunokouji, Friend, Classmate	Second voice of Ibara Yabunokouji	
1982	Boku Patalliro!	Purara, Here, Coco	Coco in Ep. 10	
1983	Serendipity the Pink Dragon	Kōna		
1983	Manga Japanese History	Empress Shōshi		
1989	A Bug's Tale: Hutch the Orphan	Aya		
2009	Kämpfer	Disemboweled Tiger		
2012	Little Charo ~Tohoku-hen~	Shizu	Ep. 4	

=== Theatrical animation ===
List of voice performances in theatrical animation
Year	Title	Role	Notes	Source
1964	Mighty Atom: The Brave in Space	Additional voice		
1969	The Wonderful World of Puss 'n Boots	Additional voice		
1971	Ali Baba and the Forty Thieves	Additional voice		
1973	Panda no Daibōken	Squirt		
1973	Babel II: Baby is a Psychic	Yumiko Furumi	Theatrical version of Babel II Ep. 21	
1978	Thumbelina	Swallow		
1980	Doraemon: Nobita's Dinosaur	Shizuka Minamoto		
1981	Doraemon: The Records of Nobita, Spaceblazer	Shizuka Minamoto		
1981	The Sea Prince and the Fire Child	Lou		
1981	Doraemon: What Am I for Momotarō?	Shizuka Minamoto	Short film	
1982	Doraemon: Nobita and the Haunts of Evil	Shizuka Minamoto		
1983	Doraemon: Nobita and the Castle of the Undersea Devil	Shizuka Minamoto		
1983	How to Enjoy Professional Baseball 10 Times More	Michiko		
1984	Doraemon: Nobita's Great Adventure into the Underworld	Shizuka Minamoto		
1984	How to Enjoy Professional Baseball 10 Times More PART 2	Michiko		
1985	Doraemon: Nobita's Little Star Wars	Shizuka Minamoto		
1986	Doraemon: Nobita and the Steel Troops	Shizuka Minamoto		
1987	Doraemon: Nobita and the Knights on Dinosaurs	Shizuka Minamoto		
1988	Doraemon: Nobita's Parallel Visit to the West	Shizuka Minamoto		
1989	Doraemon: Nobita and the Birth of Japan	Shizuka Minamoto		
1989	Dorami-chan: Mini-Dora SOS!!!	Shizuka Nobi	Short film	
1990	Doraemon: Nobita and the Animal Planet	Shizuka Minamoto		
1991	Doraemon: Nobita's Dorabian Nights	Shizuka Minamoto		
1991	Dorami-chan: Wow, The Kid Gang of Bandits!	Oshizu	Short film	
1992	Doraemon: Nobita and the Kingdom of Clouds	Shizuka Minamoto		
1993	Doraemon: Nobita and the Tin Labyrinth	Shizuka Minamoto		
1994	Doraemon: Nobita's Three Visionary Swordsmen	Shizuka Minamoto / Shizukaria / Shizukaru		
1995	Doraemon: Nobita's Diary on the Creation of the World	Shizuka Minamoto		
1996	Doraemon: Nobita and the Galaxy Super-express	Shizuka Minamoto		
1997	Doraemon: Nobita and the Spiral City	Shizuka Minamoto		
1998	Doraemon: Nobita's Great Adventure in the South Seas	Shizuka Minamoto		
1998	Doraemon Comes Back	Shizuka Minamoto	Short film	
1999	Doraemon: Nobita Drifts in the Universe	Shizuka Minamoto		
1999	Nobita's the Night Before a Wedding	Shizuka Minamoto, Future Shizuka Minamoto, Young Shizuka Minamoto	Short film	
2000	Doraemon: Nobita and the Legend of the Sun King	Shizuka Minamoto		
2000	A Grandmother's Recollections	Shizuka Minamoto	Short film	
2001	Doraemon: Nobita and the Winged Braves	Shizuka Minamoto		
2001	Good Luck! Gian!!	Shizuka Minamoto	Short film	
2002	Doraemon: Nobita in the Robot Kingdom	Shizuka Minamoto		
2002	The Day When I Was Born	Shizuka Minamoto	Short film	
2003	Doraemon: Nobita and the Windmasters	Shizuka Minamoto		
2004	Doraemon: Nobita in the Wan-Nyan Spacetime Odyssey	Shizuka Minamoto		

=== Original video animation (OVA) ===
List of voice performances in original video animation
Year	Title	Role	Notes	Source
1978	Doraemon: The Fishing Pond in My Study Room	Shizuka Minamoto	Debut role as Shizuka Minamoto	
1994	Doraemon: Nobita and the Future Notes	Shizuka Minamoto	Public education video, later released as an OVA	
2011	Kämpfer für die Liebe	Disemboweled Tiger		

=== Video games ===
List of voice performances in video games
Year	Title	Role	Platform	Source
1992	Doraemon: Nobita's Dorabian Nights	Shizuka Minamoto	PC Engine Super CD-ROM²	
1994	Doraemon 3: Nobita to Toki no Hougyoku	Shizuka Minamoto	Sega Mega Drive	
1995	The Doraemons	Shizuka Minamoto	3DO	
1995	Doraemon 4: Nobita in the Moon Kingdom	Shizuka Minamoto	Super Famicom	
1996	Doraemon: Nobita to Fukkatsu no Hoshi	Shizuka Minamoto	Sega Saturn	
1997	Doraemon 2: SOS! Otogi no Kuni	Shizuka Minamoto	Playstation	
1997	Doraemon: Nobita to Mittsu no Seireiseki	Shizuka Minamoto	Nintendo 64	
1998	Doraemon 2: Nobita to Hikari no Shinden	Shizuka Minamoto	Nintendo 64	
2000	Doraemon 3: Nobita no Machi SOS!	Shizuka Minamoto, Reina	Nintendo 64	
2000	Doraemon 3: Makai no Dungeon	Shizuka Minamoto	Playstation	
2001	Boku, Doraemon	Shizuka Minamoto	Dreamcast	
2001	Doraemon: Green Planet: The Pounding Great Rescue!	Shizuka Minamoto	Game Boy Advance	
2001	Kids Station: Doraemon: Himitsu no Yojigen Pocket	Shizuka Minamoto	Playstation	
2002	Doraemon: Koe de Dokan! Wakuwaku Kuuki Hou!!	Shizuka Minamoto	Handheld TV game	
2003	Doraemon: Minna de Asobō! Minidorando	Shizuka Minamoto	Gamecube	

=== Drama CD ===
List of drama CD performances
Year	Title	Role	Label	Catalogue number	Source
1995	TV Animation Drama Series Devilman	Miyo	Columbia	COCC-12398	
2010	Kämpfer Drama CD	Disemboweled Tiger	Bandai Visual	LACA-5995	

=== Live-action ===
List of appearances in live-action productions
Year	Title	Role	Notes	Source
2015	Doraemon, Becoming a Mother ~The Story of Nobuyo Ōyama~	Herself	Portrayed in drama segments by Misato Tanaka	
2022	To You of That Voice	Herself		

=== Soundtrack ===
List of soundtrack performances
Year	Title	Series	Notes	Source
1972	Moomin Drawing Song えかきうたムーミン	New Moomin	Performed with Eiko Masuyama, Yonehiko Kitagawa, Sanji Hase, and Keaton Yamada	

== Bibliography ==
Date	Title	Publisher	ISBN	Source
2009	Shizuka-chan ni Naru Hoho – Mezasu wa Seiyu Ichibanboshi	Libre	ISBN 978-4862636515	

== Awards ==
Year	Award	Category	Result
2005	Japanese Movie Critics Awards	Rikiya Tayama Award	Won
2006	11th Animation Kobe	Special Award	Won
2007	Tokyo Anime Award	Merit Award	Won
2016	10th Seiyu Awards	Merit Award	Won
2023	Agency for Cultural Affairs	Commissioner for Cultural Affairs' Award	Won
