= Doraemon: Nobita's Diary on the Creation of the World =

1995 film by Tsutomu Shibayama

Doraemon the Movie: Nobita's Diary on the Creation of the World
- Theatrical release poster
- Directed by: Tsutomu Shibayama
- Screenplay by: Fujiko F. Fujio
- Based on: Doraemon's Long Tales: Noby, Creator of Worlds by Fujiko F. Fujio
- Produced by: Sōichi Besshi
- Starring: Nobuyo Ōyama; Noriko Ohara; Michiko Nomura; Kaneta Kimotsuki; Kazuya Tatekabe; Megumi Hayashibara; Seiko Tomoe; Kazuhiko Inoue; Osamu Kato; Mahito Tsujimura
- Music by: Shunsuke Kikuchi
- Production company: Shin-Ei Animation
- Distributed by: Toho
- Release date: 4 March 1995
- Running time: 98 minutes
- Country: Japan
- Language: Japanese
- Box office: $20.2 million

Doraemon: Nobita's Diary on the Creation of the World (ドラえもん のび太の創世日記, Doraemon Nobita no Sōsei Nikki) is a 1995 Japanese animated science fiction drama film which premiered on March 4, 1995, in Japan, based on the 15th volume of the same name of the Doraemon Long Stories series. It is the 16th Doraemon film. It is based on the 1973 chapter "Planet Builders".

== Plot ==
The film opens with Nobita reading a picture book about the story of Adam and Eve, he comments that their descendants have to face many difficulties because of Adam and Eve's mistake. Doraemon then reminds Nobita that he had to do his summer vacation research homework. Nobita decided to see his friends' research homework, only to be discouraged to see how all of them had something to do.

Upon attempting to go to the future to view his completed homework, Nobita receives the World Creation Set ordered by Doraemon to help him with his work. Thus, Nobita started creating a new Solar System using "elements of the universe" dust and describes the process on a diary. Nobita after getting bored gets chased by Gian for doing his homework after Suneo kicks him out, he unwittingly lets the artificial sun devour the other planets. Doraemon reverses the time in the set after Nobita said he would not leave in the middle of the project, and they get to see how life on Earth forms, from tiny cells to fish-like organisms.

Doraemon takes Nobita into his universe. To speed up the process of evolving life, Doraemon caught the ancestor of land vertebrates, a Eusthenopteron, and uses the Evolution-Devolution Beam on it to evolve it however a bug had also flew into the rays as well. That night Gian attempted to meet and apologize to Nobita and persuade him for a position on the project, but saw a strange falling star. He followed it and saw two humanoid mantis-like creatures talking, the creatures see Gian and chase him but retreat when the Time Patrol come in their way, Gian then thinks all of it was a dream.

The next day, the first fish to ever walk on land had been seen, and soon followed by the ruling of the dinosaurs, which brought so much joy for Doraemon and Nobita. But soon, an asteroid hit the Earth, which caused the non-avian dinosaurs to perish. Nobita was devastated, but Doraemon comforted him. Gian and Suneo join in after Doraemon accidentally causes Suneo's manga to get taken away which causes Nobita to invite Shizuka to complete the group. All of them enter Nobita's universe, where they got to see the Earth during the Ice Age from which they helping a group of primitive kids who look like Nobita, Suneo and Gian find their way home, but also set the first step in superstition since Nobita presented with the kids, gave them the tool and called himself Kami. That day Gian ostentatiously revealed the project with two other friends, which caught the attention of the mantis-like creatures.

The next day, only Doraemon, Nobita, and Shizuka visited the universe, they see early signs of civilization, as seen with the rudimentary agriculture, witch doctors, and human sacrifices. They also met the descendants of the primitive kids and encounter a mysterious giant two-head centipede-like monster which inhabits a mountain. Once they defeat the monster, Nobita had a strange pain in his butt caused by an unusually tiny arrow.

Suneo and Gian decided to cancel their part in the project to have a vacation, which enraged the others. The duo was then kidnapped by the mantis creatures that Gian had caught sight of previously. The next day, Doraemon and Shizuka wandered off to other countries, while Nobita headed to Japan and followed his an elderly look-alike named Nobina, a herb merchandiser, who is treated badly by Suneo's look-a-like, a royal doctor named Sunemaru. Nobina, on the way home, rescues and takes care of an injured beetle-like creature whom he calls Chunko. When Nobina's wife found out and kicked Chunko out of their house, Nobina went searching and reunited with her when a couple guided him through a cave to an exotic kingdom, where Nobina was treated well and rewarded with a huge amount of treasure, ending his long-lasting suffer in poverty. The daughter of Sunemaru then vanished, starting a vigorous search as people suspected she was caught by an evil supernatural force. The couple, now revealing themself to be insect-like citizens, create an illusionary demonic entity to scare the people away, which is later shown to be a gathering of thousands of insect people. Fortunately, the daughter is found oversleeping by a tree.

The trio, after traveling through many different cultures, had noticed the existence of tiny flying creatures and stories of an underworld land coincidentally shared among ages and countries. The next day, the group traveled to Japan in likely the Taishō era and followed the air balloon led by Dr. Dekimatsu, Mr. President Nobihide and his secretary Shizuyo, the contemporary versions of Dekisugi, Nobita, and Shizuka respectively, to a newly found giant hole in the South Pole. The crew was stopped by the figure of a god-like man, which Doraemon reveals to be another gathering of tiny insect people. He disintegrates it using his gadget, helping the crew to go on.

They arrive at the hole and enter it to reach at a different underground world where mantis-like humanoids inhabit, Nobihide attempts to negotiate with the leader who reveals that they are going to capture the surface world. While Nobita and friends meet Gian and Suneo with an insect boy, he also has a robot like Doraemon. The boy says that he was trying to learn about the evolution of sea animals to land living animals, Nobita then reveals he caused it. The mantis-like humanoids were ready to attack the airship. Doraemon appears and says that Nobita had created the world and gives the mantis-like humanoids a World Creation Set of their own letting them establish their ideal world and saving the surface humans from certain doom.

The movie ends with Nobita deciding that neither the humans or mantis-like humanoids need his help anymore and leaving forever. During the end credits, it's revealed all four of the main human characters jointly complete the project.

== Cast ==
Character	Japanese voice actor
Doraemon	Nobuyo Ōyama
Nobita Nobi	Noriko Ohara
Shizuka Minamoto	Michiko Nomura
Suneo Honekawa	Kaneta Kimotsuki
Takeshi "Gian" Gōda	Kazuya Tatekabe
Tamako Nobi	Sachiko Chijimatsu
Nobisuke Nobi	Yōsuke Naka
Hidetoshi Dekisugi	Sumiko Shirakawa
Sensei	Ryōichi Tanaka
Michiko Minamoto	Masako Matsubara
Nonbi	Megumi Hayashibara
Nobiko	Megumi Hayashibara
Himemiko	Seiko Tomoe
Xiu Nobi	Kazuhiko Inoue
Ototo	Osamu Katō
Hina	Mahito Tsujimura
Suneko	Kyoko Yamada
Yorimitsu Minamoto	Minoru Inaba
President Nobihide Nobi	Kazuhiko Inoue
Dr. Dekimatsu	Sho Hayami
Shizuyo	Sakiko Tamagawa
Chunko	Satomi Kōrogi
Insect Man and Woman	Daiki Nakamura; Miki Itou
Insect President	Yasuo Muramatsu
Bitano	Megumi Hayashibara
Emodoran	Kyoko Yamada
God	Akio Ōtsuka
Insect people	Shinya Ohtaki
Time Patrol	Yōsuke Akimoto; Hirohiko Kakegawa
Driver	Kazuhiko Kishino
Bookstore shopkeeper	Takashi Taguchi

== Music ==
=== Opening theme ===
"Doraemon no Uta" (ドラえもんのうた)
Lyrics: Takumi Kusube / Composition and Arrangement: Shunsuke Kikuchi / Vocals: Satoko Yamano (Nippon Columbia)

=== Ending theme ===
"Sayonara ni Sayonara" (さよならにさよなら)
Lyrics: Tetsuya Takeda / Composition: Kazuomi Chiba / Arrangement: Ikurō Fujiwara / Vocals: Kaientai (Polydor Records)

== See also ==
- List of Doraemon films
