= The Day When I Was Born =

2002 film by Ayumu Watanabe

- Cover of the 2004 DVD release by Shogakukan and Pony Canyon including Doraemon: Nobita in the Robot Kingdom and The Doraemons: Goal! Goal! Goal!!
- Kanji: ぼくの生まれた日
- Revised Hepburn: Boku no Umareta Hi
- Directed by: Ayumu Watanabe
- Screenplay by: Nobuyuki Fujimoto
- Based on: Doraemon by Fujiko F. Fujio
- Produced by: Yoshihiko Ichikawa; Taro Iwamoto; Jun Kaji
- Starring: Noriko Ohara; Nobuyo Ōyama; Sachiko Chijimatsu; Yōsuke Naka; Michiko Nomura; Kazuya Tatekabe; Kaneta Kimotsuki
- Edited by: Hajime Okayasu; Toshihiko Kojima; Yumiko Nakaba; Hideaki Murai; Akihiro Kawasaki; Yoshitaka Miyake
- Music by: Shunsuke Kikuchi
- Production company: Shin-Ei Animation
- Distributed by: Toho
- Release date: March 9, 2002 (Japan)
- Running time: 26 minutes
- Country: Japan
- Language: Japanese
- Box office: $21.1 million

The Day When I Was Born (ぼくの生まれた日, Boku no Umareta Hi) is a 2002 Japanese animated science fiction comedy-drama short film.

Directed by Ayumu Watanabe, it premiered in Japan on March 9, 2002 on a triple feature with Doraemon: Nobita in the Robot Kingdom and The Doraemons: Goal! Goal! Goal!!.

Largely an expanded version of the 1972 chapter of the same name, it is the fifth and last of five theatrical Doraemon short films directed by Watanabe.

== Plot ==
Coming soon!

== Cast ==
Character	Japanese voice actor
Nobita Nobi	Noriko Ohara
Doraemon	Nobuyo Ōyama
Tamako Nobi	Sachiko Chijimatsu
Nobisuke Nobi	Yōsuke Naka
Shizuka Minamoto	Michiko Nomura
Suneo Honekawa	Kaneta Kimotsuki
Takeshi "Gian" Gōda	Kazuya Tatekabe
Michiko Minamoto	Masako Matsubara
Mrs. Honekawa	Mari Yokoo
Mrs. Gōda	Kazuyo Aoki
Female Nurse 1	Yūko Satō
Female Nurse 2	Sachi Matsumoto

== Production ==
It is the last short in the "Doraemon Moving Series" of five short films directed by Ayumu Watanabe.

The scene where Nobita runs away from home in the rain and walks through town was said to have been a direct reflection of director Watanabe running away from home in fifth grade.

== Soundtrack ==
=== Theme song ===
"Kimi ni Aitakute" (キミに会いたくて)
Lyrics: Akiko Kosaka / Composition: Akiko Kosaka / Arrangement: Akiko Kosaka / Vocals: Akiko Kosaka

== Release ==
The short film was released in Japan theatrically on a triple feature with Doraemon: Nobita in the Robot Kingdom and The Doraemons: Goal! Goal! Goal!! on March 9, 2002.

=== Television broadcasts ===
In late 2013, to commemorate the 80th anniversary of Fujiko F. Fujio's birth, the short aired on TV Asahi's CS TV Asahi Channel 1 in a 27 hour special marathon with other Fujiko anime and Doraemon shorts on December 1st and 7th.

In 2014, to commemorate the release of Doraemon: Nobita in the New Haunts of Evil ~Peko and the Five Explorers~, The Day When I Was Born alongside various Doraemon episodes and theatrical films such as Doraemon: Nobita's Dinosaur and Doraemon: A Grandmother's Recollections, aired in a marathon on CS TV Asahi Channel 1 for 22 hours on March 1st and 8th.

=== Streaming ===
In 2024, for the occasion of the 90th anniversary of Fujiko F. Fujio, The Day When I Was Born alongside numerous animated short films of Doraemon, Perman, Esper Mami, and Chimpui were made available to stream on Prime Video in Japan as the "Fujiko F. Fujio's 90th Anniversary Film Masterpiece Selection".
