= Nobuyo Ōyama =

Japanese actress (1933–2024)

- 大山 のぶ代
- Born: Nobuyo Yamashita (山下 羨代); October 16, 1933; Shibuya, Tokyo Prefecture, Empire of Japan
- Died: September 29, 2024 (aged 90); Tokyo, Japan
- Resting place: Daiunji Temple, Shibuya Ward
- Other names: Peko (ペコ); Nobuemon (のぶえもん)
- Occupations: Actress; screenwriter; voice actress; singer; essayist; television personality
- Years active: 1956–2016
- Agent: Actors Seven (final affiliation)
- Notable credit(s): Doraemon as Doraemon; Danganronpa as Monokuma
- Spouse: Keisuke Sagawa (m. 1964; died 2017)

Nobuyo Yamashita (山下 羨代, Yamashita Nobuyo; née Ōyama, October 16, 1933 – September 29, 2024), known professionally as Nobuyo Ōyama (大山 のぶ代, Ōyama Nobuyo), was a Japanese actress last affiliated with Actors Seven. Her husband was actor and television personality Keisuke Sagawa. She is best known for voicing Doraemon, the titular character of the Doraemon franchise from 1979 to 2005 and Monokuma, the main antagonist of the Danganronpa franchise from 2010 to 2016.

== Biography ==
=== Early life ===
Ōyama was born as the thirteenth in a four-generation family of thirteen people on October 16, 1933. Her great-grandparents were born in the Edo period of Japan and her mother was the daughter of a sake brewer in Furukawa City, Miyagi Prefecture (now Ōsaki, Miyagi City).

She graduated from Rinkawa Elementary School, Hiroo Elementary School, Hiroo Junior High School and Mita High School, Tokyo.

Since an early age, she had a distinctive voice, and when she answered the phone at her kindergarten entrance ceremony, all of the students' parents all stood up and stared. However Ōyama herself was oblivious to reactions. She was such a talkative person that her mother would often tell her, "If you are quiet for a while, I'll give you a treat."

As she entered elementary school, Ōyama was initially an active girl who would run around the schoolyard raising her voice, but people around her would often tell her that she had a "boy's voice," and her teachers gave her strange looks when she checked in for her attendance, so she began to think her voice was strange.

Once Ōyama entered junior high school, a classmate pointed out how her voice was, and that is when she started to become aware of her unique voice. She started to feel disgusted by her voice, and became a quieter person.

She was bullied by her school classmates because of her voice, with a game of "everyone will laugh when Ōyama makes a sound" becoming popular in class. She grew withdrawn, but her mother advised her, "Just because you have a strange voice, if you keep coddling that weakness, it will only get weaker. Join a club activity where you have to use your voice."

Ōyama became satisfied with her voice over time, and was able to overcome her complex. However, she never expected to become a voice actress. Her surrounding peers and homeroom teacher were initially opposed to her school activities, though after a month, they stopped saying their objections, and Ōyama was soon invited to join the school's drama club. Her stage debut was the role of the wicked stepmother in the school's play of Cinderella.

In high school, Ōyama joined the drama and swimming clubs, but soon dropped out when her mother ended up being hospitalized, and then died of uterine cancer at the age of 42 while she was in her second high school year. Now by herself, Ōyama decided to pursue a career in acting.

=== Career ===
Following high school, Ōyama entered the Haiyuza Training School as a member of the seventh batch, but her father, who was against these plans, told her, "If you want to be an actor, get out!", so she ran away from home and started living alone. She quickly realized that she would be unable to survive solely on the money that was sent to her from her supportive older brother, so she tried various part-time jobs to earn money for living. Her classmates there included Kumi Mizuno, Shigeru Tsuyuguchi, Hisashi Igawa, Manabu Yamamoto, Shigeyoshi Fujioka, and Kunie Tanaka.

She made her debut in the NHK drama Kono Hitomi in 1956. She began her acting career while in the training school, and after graduating in 1957, she joined the theater company Shinjinkai.

When Ōyama started her career, she received praise as "a funny kid" and "a comedian with a background in modern theater", and appeared in many dramas and comedy shows. She began her voice acting career after a friend noticed her unique husky voice and told her that her voice suited young male roles. Her voice acting debut was in the Japanese dub of Lassie, which aired in September 1957.

In 1960, Ōyama voiced the character Boo in the Japanese puppet show Boo Foo Woo, which led to an increase in voice work.

In 1965, Ōyama made her debut as a lead voice actor in the television anime Hustle Punch, where she voiced the character Hustle. After that, she then starred in several anime productions such as Harris no Kaze and Invincible Super Man Zambot 3.

She was affiliated with Tokyo Pro, Gekidan Deku, Takamatsu Riyuko Office, and Aoni Production.

In late 1978, she was officially cast as the voice of the titular character in the Doraemon anime series, which premiered on TV Asahi the next year. It became her most popular work.

She also became active in a wide range of fields other than voice acting, such as working as a TV personality and publishing books as a cooking expert.

In 1980, sales of Doraemon-related records performed by Ōyama, including the EP Doraemon Ondo, exceeded over one million copies, which earned her an awarded Gold Disc from Nippon Columbia.

In 2001, Ōyama was diagnosed with colon cancer and was hospitalized for a long time, causing her to take time off from all work except for Doraemon, as she decided to continue recording episodes during her treatment after she took her physical condition into consideration. However, the hospitalization led to her decision to retire from the role of Doraemon. At first, she continued on at the persuasion of the anime's staff, but after long-term discussions, officially left the franchise along the other cast members in March 2005 after 26 years.

=== After Doraemon ===
After leaving the Doraemon franchise, Ōyama focused on giving lectures and making television and radio appearances. She also continued her voice acting work, narrating shows such as Gansou! Debuya.

In March 2005, Ōyama received the Broadcasting Woman Award.

In May 2006, Ōyama published an autobiographical essay titled, I Was Doraemon. 26 Years of Tears and Laughter which focused on detailing her 26 years voicing Doraemon and was published by Shogakukan.

Six months later, she was awarded a special prize at the 11th Kobe Animation Awards for her achievements on Doraemon alongside her Doraemon co-stars Noriko Ohara, Michiko Nomura, Kaneta Kimotsuki, and Kazuya Tatekabe. The following year in March 2007, they received the Merit Award of the Tokyo Anime Awards at the Tokyo International Anime Fair.

In April 2007, Ōyama became principal of the Acoustic Arts College in Nishi-Shinbashi, Minato-ku, Tokyo. In addition to organizing the curriculum, she also taught many day and night classes for the voice actor and announcer courses, providing direct instructions to students.

On April 24, 2008, while preparing for class in the principal's office at the Acoustic Arts College, Ōyama suffered a cerebral infarction and was hospitalized, but with proper medication, she was discharged on August 17. Through home recuperation and rehabilitation, she ended up recovering to where she was able to carry out daily activities without worry.

In 2010, Ōyama portrayed the antagonist Monokuma in the PSP video game Danganronpa: Trigger Happy Havoc. She continued to voice Monokuma in the Danganronpa franchise, and in 2013, the series was made into a television anime adaptation entitled Danganronpa: The Animation, which was both her first TV anime appearance since Doraemon and her first appearance in a late-night television anime.

In April 2011, Ōyama decided to step down from her position as principal of the Acoustic Arts College and became its honorary president. Though she stepped back from most practical duties, she continued to give special lectures once every few months until 2013. Around this time, she started limiting her work, citing poor health caused by a busy and intense work schedule.

=== Final years ===
In the fall of 2012, Ōyama was diagnosed with Alzheimer's disease. Initially, her husband Keisuke Sagawa was worried that it would "tarnish the image of Doraemon and her", so the diagnosis was kept secret for a few years. However, after he received advice from fellow actor Sandayū Dokumamushi, he reconsidered, and on May 13, 2015, Sagawa publicly announced Ōyama's diagnosis during a guest appearance on TBS Radio's Ōsawa Yūri no Yūyū Wide program. At the time the announcement was made public, Ōyama said that she had already forgot that she and her husband discussed it.

Although she continued to work after the announcement, she stopped making public appearances and work was limited to recording messages. From 2014 to 2016, Ōyama appeared in the National Federation of Agricultural Cooperative Associations' web anime I Love Meat! Zeushi-kun as Minota, but this ended up being her final anime voice acting role.

On June 12, 2015, Sagawa appeared on Tetsuko Kuroyanagi's show Tetsuko's Room, of which he had made previous appearances on many times with Ōyama. Ōyama sent a voice message to Kuroyanagi. During the broadcast, she realized that her illness was made public, and remarked, "Why did they make such a big deal out of this?" Afterwards, Sagawa told her, "It's not an exaggeration at all," and "In order to cheer her up, we need to make sure people know the truth, so we can do our best," to which Ōyama replied back, "Yeah, I'll do my best."

Following Ōyama's wishes, she was cared for at home by Sagawa, the couple's manager Akiko Kobayashi, and a housekeeper for a while after the onset. However, Sagawa started to receive treatment for ureteral cancer, so she entered a nursing home in April 2016. That month, Ōyama's role of Monokuma in the Danganronpa franchise was recast with Tarako. Ōyama officially announced her retirement in December.

Sagawa died on July 11, 2017, at the age of 80. After Sagawa's death, Ōyama continued to live in the nursing home, and was looked after by Kobayashi. While her dementia was progressing, she was in overall good health, and enjoyed interacting with other residents, taking on a leadership role in activities such as singing in choir.

By the last year of her life, her advancing age had made it difficult for her speaking voice and she suffered numerous health problems.

=== Death ===
Ōyama died of senility in Tokyo on September 29, 2024, at the age of 90. Actors Seven announced her death that October, and many animators, voice actors, and fans paid tribute to her on social media. Later in the month, a dedication to Ōyama was shown during the broadcasting of Doraemon and Sazae-san. The Fujiko F. Fujio Museum and Doraemon's current voice actress Wasabi Mizuta also wrote eulogies for her.

Her grave is located at Daiunji Temple, Shibuya Ward.

In April 2026, it was reported in "Josei Seven Plus" that her home located in Tokyo was sold in February of that year and because there are no heirs following both her and Sagawa's deaths, the entire estate has been turned over to the national treasury.

== Personality ==
Her voice range was alto.

As a voice actress, Ōyama had been active since the dawn of television anime. Her unique way of laughter, which sounds like either "uhihi" or "ufufu", has been praised and regarded as a memorable characteristic.

In many of her non-Doraemon roles, she voiced young boy characters, and was known for her husky, mischievous way of talking, and used a rough and tumble manner of speaking.

Ōyama's personal motto was "I want to be a pipe", which reflected her desire to pass down knowledge such as legends and proverbs she inherited from her predecessors onto the next generation.

== Successors ==
Due to Ōyama's decision to solely focus on Doraemon and her subsequent aging, the following individuals have taken over some of her voice acting roles.

Successor	Character	Work	Debut
Chika Sakamoto	Kappei Jin	Invincible Super Man Zambot 3	Super Robot Wars Impact
Wasabi Mizuta	Doraemon	Doraemon	Episode broadcast on April 15, 2005
Tarako	Monokuma	Danganronpa	Danganronpa THE STAGE: The Academy of Hope and the High School Students of Despair 2016

== Legacy and accolades ==
Ōyama was best known for voicing Doraemon in the Doraemon franchise from 1979 to 2005 and Monokuma in the Danganronpa franchise from 2010 to 2016. Ōyama is known as the voice of Doraemon by many Doraemon fans and is popular in the Danganronpa fandom for her performance.

She was also a culinary expert and often published books of her own, such as Nobuyo Ōyama's Interesting Sake and Food, which ended up selling over 1.36 million copies, becoming a bestseller.

In February 2022, Fuji TV aired a variety show, This Is A Classic! Best Anime Entertainment Generation By Generation, where a survey was held for "favorite voice actors" from different generations over the decades and Ōyama came in first place in the Showa generation category.

In March 2025, she and Doraemon co-star Noriko Ohara posthumously received the "Special Award from the Chairman" at the 48th Japan Academy Film Prize for "outstanding contributions and outstanding results in the film industry over many years". That same month, actor Sandayū Dokumamushi made a guest appearance in an episode of the television program Tetsuko's Room as a representative of Ōyama's close friends, where he discussed personal memories with Ōyama with the show's hostess Tetsuko Kuroyanagi, whom Ōyama had co-starred with in the NHK costume puppet segments Boo Foo Woo on Okaasan to Issho.

In September 2025, on the one year anniversary of her death, a memorial gathering for Ōyama was held. Several close friends and colleagues, such as Michiko Nomura, Wasabi Mizuta, Michio Hazama, Masako Nozawa, Mari Shimizu, Miyuki Ueda, and Eiko Yamada attended the service.

== Filmography ==
=== Television series ===
List of performances in television series
Year	Title	Role	Notes	Source
1958	Mammoth Tower	Performer	TBS Television drama	
1965	Sazae-san	Chieko Sunayama	TBS Television drama	
1974	Toshu With Broken Umbrella Villain Hunting	O Shin	TV Asahi drama	
1977	Edo o Kiru III	Saki	TBS Television drama	
1979	Edo o Kiru IV	Saki	TBS Television drama	
1980	Ōdonoarashi	Seiran	Nippon Television tokusatsu drama	
1980	Journey of Destiny: The Mystery of Limited Express Izumo No. 1	Additional role	Aired in the Saturday Wide Theater drama program	
2003	Kougen e Irasshai	Mineko Seki	BS-TBS television drama	
2003	Susumu Samonji the Private Eye	Taeko Masuda (Takamura's housekeeper)	Ep. 11	

=== Feature films ===
List of performances in feature films
Year	Title	Role	Notes	Source
1980	Omoeba Tōku e Kita Mon Da	Yoshiko's mother	TBS television drama	
1981	Psychic School Wars	Housewife	Theatrical release	
1986	Baby Elephant Story: The Angel Who Descended to Earth	Momoyo (Shota's mother)	Theatrical release	
1993	The Sun Is Our Friend: Hold Out, the Soraemon!	Soraemon (voice)	Live-action short film	

=== Television animation ===
List of voice performances in television animation
Year	Title	Role	Notes	Source
1965	Hustle Punch	Punch	First anime lead role	
1965	Super Jetter	Prince Alexander		
1966	Harris no Kaze	Kunimatsu Ishida		
1967	The Golden Bat	Additional voice		
1967	Princess Knight	Sandman		
1968	Star of the Giants	Additional voice		
1968	Humanoid Monster Bem	Jam		
1969	Sazae-san	Katsuo Isono	First voice	
1969	The Genie Family	Additional voice		
1970	Chippo the Mischievous Angel	Additional voice		
1970	Norakuro	Norakuro	Lead role	
1971	Andersen Stories	Top	Ep. 20	
1971	Kunimatsu-sama no Otōridai	Kunimatsu Ishida	Lead role	
1972	Hazedon	Hazedon	Lead role	
1973	Demetan Croaker, The Boy Frog	Morita Salamander	Ep. 21	
1975	Maya the Honey Bee	Bagworm		
1977	Invincible Super Man Zambot 3	Jin Kappei	Lead role	
1979–2005	Doraemon	Doraemon	Lead role	
1980	Dora.Q.Perman	Doraemon	Television special	
1996	The Doraemons: Mystery X'mas Great Operation!	Doraemon	Television special	
2013	Danganronpa: The Animation	Monokuma	Lead role	
2014	Wooser's Hand-to-Mouth Life: Awakening Arc	Monokuma	Ep. 10	

=== Theatrical animation ===
List of voice performances in theatrical animation
Year	Title	Role	Source
1968	Luck of the Sea and Luck of the Mountain	Additional voice	
1971	Ali Baba and the Forty Thieves	Huck	
1972	Kunimatsu-sama no Otōridai	Additional voice	
1979	Adventures of the Polar Cubs	Aura	
1980	Doraemon: Nobita's Dinosaur	Doraemon	
1981	Doraemon: The Records of Nobita, Spaceblazer	Doraemon	
1981	Doraemon: What Am I for Momotarō?	Doraemon	
1982	Doraemon: Nobita and the Haunts of Evil	Doraemon	
1983	Doraemon: Nobita and the Castle of the Undersea Devil	Doraemon	
1984	Doraemon: Nobita's Great Adventure into the Underworld	Doraemon	
1985	Doraemon: Nobita's Little Star Wars	Doraemon	
1986	Doraemon: Nobita and the Steel Troops	Doraemon	
1987	Doraemon: Nobita and the Knights on Dinosaurs	Doraemon	
1988	Doraemon: The Record of Nobita's Parallel Visit to the West	Doraemon	
1989	Doraemon: Nobita and the Birth of Japan	Doraemon	
1990	Doraemon: Nobita and the Animal Planet	Doraemon	
1991	Doraemon: Nobita's Dorabian Nights	Doraemon	
1992	Doraemon: Nobita and the Kingdom of Clouds	Doraemon	
1993	Doraemon: Nobita and the Tin Labyrinth	Doraemon	
1994	Doraemon: Nobita's Three Visionary Swordsmen	Doraemon	
1995	Doraemon: Nobita's Diary of the Creation of the World	Doraemon	
1995	2112: The Birth of Doraemon	Doraemon	
1996	Doraemon: Nobita and the Galaxy Super-express	Doraemon	
1996	Dorami & Doraemons: Robot School's Seven Mysteries!?	Doraemon	
1997	Doraemon: Nobita and the Spiral City	Doraemon	
1997	The Doraemons: The Puzzling Challenge Letter of the Mysterious Thief Dorapin!	Doraemon	
1998	Doraemon: Nobita's Great Adventure in the South Seas	Doraemon	
1998	Doraemon Comes Back	Doraemon	
1999	Doraemon: Nobita Drifts in the Universe	Doraemon	
1999	The Doraemons: Funny Candy of Okashinana?	Doraemon	
1999	Nobita's the Night Before a Wedding	Doraemon	
2000	Doraemon: Nobita and the Legend of the Sun King	Doraemon	
2000	The Doraemons: Doki Doki Wildcat Engine!	Doraemon	
2000	A Grandmother's Recollections	Doraemon	
2001	Doraemon: Nobita and the Winged Braves	Doraemon	
2001	Good Luck! Gian!!	Doraemon	
2002	Doraemon: Nobita in the Robot Kingdom	Doraemon	
2002	The Day When I Was Born	Doraemon	
2003	Doraemon: Nobita and the Windmasters	Doraemon	
2004	Doraemon: Nobita in the Wan-Nyan Spacetime Odyssey	Doraemon	
2004	Doraemon's 25th Anniversary	Doraemon	
2013	Eagle Talon Go: Beautiful Eliere Deodorant Plus	Taka-no-Saturn	

=== Original video animation (OVA) ===
List of voice performances in original video animations
Year	Title	Role	Notes	Source
1978	Doraemon: The Fishing Pond in My Study Room	Doraemon	Debut role as Doraemon	
1994	Doraemon: Nobita and the Future Notes	Doraemon	Public education video, later released as an OVA	
1996	Doraemon's Fun Learning Series: How to Write Hiragana 2 - Finishing Touches on Writing	Doraemon		
2001	Doraemon's Video Picture Book Series 1: Zoo Favorites	Doraemon		
2001	Doraemon's Video Picture Book Series 2: Shinkansen	Doraemon		
2001	Doraemon's Video Picture Book Series 3: Siren Vehicles	Doraemon		
2001	Doraemon's Video Picture Book Series 4: Safari Zoo	Doraemon		
2001	Doraemon's Video Picture Book Series 5: Limited Express Trains	Doraemon		
2001	Doraemon's Video Picture Book Series 6: Working Cars	Doraemon		
2001	Doraemon's Video Picture Book Series 7: Fun Trains	Doraemon		
2001	Doraemon's Video Picture Book Series 8: Maze Play	Doraemon		
2001	Doraemon's Video Picture Book Series 9: Let's Play with Animals	Doraemon		
2001	Doraemon's Video Picture Book Series 10: Cars Galore	Doraemon		

=== Dubbing ===
==== Feature films ====
List of dub performances in feature films
Title	Role	Notes	Source
Frogs	Iris Martindale (Hollis Irving)	1975 Japanese edition	

=== Web animation ===
List of voice performances in web animation
Year	Title	Role	Notes	Source
2014	I Love Meat! Zeushi-kun	Minota		
2014	I Love Meat! Zeushi-kun Season 2	Minota	Final anime voice acting role	

=== Video games ===
List of voice performances in video games
Year	Title	Role	Notes	Source
1992	Doraemon: Nobita's Dorabian Nights	Doraemon	PC Engine Super CD-ROM²	
1993	Doraemon: Yume Dorobou to 7 Nin no Gozans	Doraemon	Sega Mega Drive	
1994	Doraemon 3: Nobita to Toki no Hougyoku	Doraemon	Sega Mega Drive	
1995	The Doraemons	Doraemon	3DO	
1995	Doraemon 4: Nobita in the Moon Kingdom	Doraemon	Super Famicom	
1996	Doraemon: Nobita to Fukkatsu no Hoshi	Doraemon	Sega Saturn	
1997	Doraemon 2: SOS! Otogi no Kuni	Doraemon	Playstation	
1997	Doraemon: Nobita to Mittsu no Seireiseki	Doraemon	Nintendo 64	
1998	Doraemon 2: Nobita to Hikari no Shinden	Doraemon	Nintendo 64	
2000	Doraemon 3: Nobita no Machi SOS!	Doraemon	Nintendo 64	
2000	Doraemon 3: Makai no Dungeon	Doraemon	Playstation	
2001	Boku, Doraemon	Doraemon	Dreamcast	
2001	Doraemon: Green Planet: The Pounding Great Rescue!	Doraemon	Game Boy Advance	
2001	Kids Station: Doraemon: Himitsu no Yojigen Pocket	Doraemon	Playstation	
2002	Doraemon: Koe de Dokan! Wakuwaku Kuuki Hou!!	Doraemon	Handheld TV game	
2002	Doraemon Board Game	Doraemon	Game Boy Advance	
2003	Doraemon: Minna de Asobō! Minidorando	Doraemon	Gamecube	
2010	Danganronpa: Trigger Happy Havoc	Monokuma	Playstation Portable	
2012	Danganronpa 2: Goodbye Despair	Monokuma	Playstation Portable, also Reload in 2013	
2014	Danganronpa Another Episode: Ultra Despair Girls	Monokuma	Playstation Vita	
2021	Danganronpa S: Ultimate Summer Camp	Monokuma	Multi-platform	

=== Radio ===
List of voice performances in radio
Year	Title	Role	Notes	Source
1966	Night on the Galactic Railroad	Giovanni		
1998	Hoshin Engi	Hakutsuru Doji		
1999	Hoshin Engi Part Two: The Court Army Strikes Back	Hakutsuru Doji		
2000	Hoshin Engi Part Three: Dynastic Revolution	Hakutsuru Doji		

=== Puppet shows ===
List of voice performances in puppet shows
Year	Title	Role	Notes	Source
1959–1960	Sun Wukong	Titin		
1960–1967	Boo Foo Woo	Boo	Lead role	
1961	Robotan	Winnie-the-Pooh		
1964–1969	Hyokkori Hyōtanjima	Kaminarimon Gorosuke	Ankoropin Kingdom Series	
1967–1969	Dattokun	Gonta-kun		
1969–1971	Tonchin ko Bōzu	Kannenbou		
1971–1974	Tondeke Bucchī	Butchie		
1979–1983	Mew Mew Nyaa Nyaa	Buruko-san		

Preceded by Masako Nozawa	Voice of Doraemon; 1979–2005	Succeeded by Wasabi Mizuta

Preceded by None	Voice of Monokuma; 2010–2016	Succeeded by Tarako
