= Doraemon: Nobita and the Legend of the Sun King =

2000 film by Tsutomu Shibayama

Doraemon the Movie: Nobita and the Legend of the Sun King
- Theatrical release poster
- Directed by: Tsutomu Shibayama
- Screenplay by: Nobuaki Kishima
- Based on: Doraemon by Fujiko F. Fujio
- Produced by: Hideki Yamakawa; Kumi Ogura; Masatoshi Osawa; Yuka Takahashi
- Starring: Nobuyo Ōyama; Noriko Ohara; Michiko Nomura; Kaneta Kimotsuki; Kazuya Tatekabe; Megumi Ogata; Mayumi Iizuka; Kazuko Sugiyama; Kōji Nakata; Jun Kurasawa; Hiroko Suzuki
- Cinematography: Toshiyuki Umeda
- Edited by: Hajime Okayasu
- Music by: Katsumi Horii
- Production company: Shin-Ei Animation
- Distributed by: Toho
- Release date: March 7, 2000 (Japan)
- Running time: 93 minutes
- Country: Japan
- Language: Japanese
- Box office: $31.3 million

Doraemon: Nobita and the Legend of the Sun King (ドラえもん のび太の太陽王伝説, Doraemon Nobita no Taiyōō Densetsu), also known as Doraemon and the Empire of the Sun, is a 2000 Japanese animated science fantasy adventure film, which premiered on March 7, 2000, in Japan, based on the 20th volume of the same name of the Doraemon's Long Tales series. The film presents a plot similar to the story The Prince and the Pauper by Mark Twain, where Nobita and a prince identical to him named Tio switch places.

It premiered on a triple feature with the short films Doraemon: A Grandmother's Recollections and The Doraemons: Doki Doki Wildcat Engine!. It was a successful film at the box office, grossing around ¥3.42 billion ($32 million), becoming the highest grossing Doraemon film of the original series and the highest grossing Doraemon film until it was surpassed by Doraemon: Nobita's Treasure Island in 2018.

It's the 21st Doraemon film and celebrates the 30th anniversary of the Doraemon franchise.

== Plot ==
The film opens in a Mesoamerican kingdom, called Mayana, which is ruled by a queen until an evil witch, Ledina, casts a spell putting her into eternal sleep. Until the queen awakes, the throne is held by her son, Prince Tio. The film cuts to modern Japan, where Nobita and his friends are rehearsing for Snow White for their school play with Doraemon's gadget, but a series of miscasts halt their progress.

Gian selfishly takes the gadget to perform on an imaginary stadium, leading to Doraemon, Nobita, and Shizuka's attempt to take them back through a time portal. Gian's violent reaction breaks the portal, unknowingly connecting it to Mayana. Tio's jerboa-like pet, Popol trashes Nobita's room and takes his test papers and comics into the forest, forcing Nobita and Doraemon to cross the portal to collect them.

Along the way, Nobita is cornered by Tio, when they find out that both of them look-alike, Tio then attempts to kill Nobita but they both fall into a mud-lake and Tio realizes he's friendly. Doraemon and Tio go through the portal, but Nobita who attempts to retrieve his papers and comics gets captured by the kingdom guards, who think he's Tio. Tio himself, amazed by the "magic" of modern technology, decides that he will switch places with Nobita temporarily, which Doraemon reluctantly accepts.

In Mayana, culture shock and having to practice martial arts as a prince are Nobita's hardships when assuming Tio's role. However, Nobita astonishes everyone with his friendly nature, as they had to face Tio's usual arrogance. He befriends Tio's childhood friend, Kuku after getting knocked out in martial arts practice with her father. Kuku, long having had a crush on Tio, is pleased by "Tio's" change of attitude when Nobita accepts her offer to make him a necklace. Using Doraemon's gadgets, he helps the kingdom, cursed by Ledina, amazing everyone.

In Japan, Tio's surly and violent tendencies constantly cause problems and leads to Gian getting beat up badly and Shizuka to proclaim that she hates Nobita like this, causing Doraemon to expose the secret. With Tio returning to Mayana alongside Doraemon, Shizuka, Gian, and Suneo, Nobita is forced to wear a woman's attire so as to not confuse the people of Mayana. Gian offers to become Ishumaru's student and Nobita helps Tio win a match in a ball game.

After Nobita's group leaves, Kuku presents a string figure to Tio, who outright rejects it, leading her to run away crying. However, Tio remembers Shizuka getting mad at him while posing as Nobita and runs after Kuku to apologize. As Kuku cries near the river, Ledina's animal-controlling henchman kidnaps her to lure Tio to her palace, who then tries to rescue her on his own. The next day, Doraemon's group and Ishumaru stage a rescue of both of them, with Nobita wearing the prince attire as well as the necklace given to him by Kuku.

After saving Tio, they escape a snake pit where Ishumaru seemingly falls to his death. Unbeknownst to the group, Ledina sees that Tio disobeyed her demand to come alone at her palace and decides to eliminate the others. The group is then attacked by the henchman who kidnapped Kuku earlier, Tio is then kidnapped by an eagle and falls into the jungle. The others defeat the henchman after Doraemon feeds a special kind of gum to the man's crocodile steed which then floats to the sky.

Trying to find Tio, an illusion-causing underling of Ledina informs the group that Kuku will be sacrificed at Ledina's pyramid-shaped temple. The group move onto the pyramid where they are attacked and eventually defeat said henchmen. Ledina tells "Tio" to come to her as a sacrifice to give her endless youth during the solar eclipse in exchange for Kuku's life. Ledina demands the rest not to get in her way, burns Doraemon's four-dimensional pocket and sends out a warrior henchman who attacks Gian. A fight ensues, but Ishumaru, having survived his fall, comes to Gian's aid and defeats the warrior. Nobita seemingly offers himself, but reveals that he had the spare pocket and uses a switching handkerchief to replace Kuku with a stone statue before attempting to escape.

Enraged at his attempt to defy her, Ledina captures him, but the people of Mayana arrive to save "Tio". Ledina is unimpressed and is about to kill Nobita, when Tio reveals himself and offers to sacrifice himself for Nobita who taught him about friendship. Unfortunately, Ledina sees that she's running out of time and decides to use Nobita, but the sun shines on Kuku's necklace which blinds Ledina giving him a chance to be freed from her grasp and throw Doraemon the spare pocket. Ledina's ritual soon fails and reveals her true, elderly appearance. She activates the temple's self-destruction system in one final attempt to kill Tio, but he and Nobita are saved by Ledina's condor, which is turned friendly by Doraemon's Momotaro dangos.

Kuku is rescued, though she remains in an enchanted sleep. Shizuka suggests that she can only be woken up in a way akin to Snow White's ending. Tio heeds and kisses Kuku, freeing her from the spell. The queen, having awoken from her sleep, announces that Tio will succeed her as king.

The film ends with Nobita and his friends finding out that the portal is weakening and likely unable to connect with Mayana again. Without Tio's presence, Nobita bids his last farewell to him. In the end credits, Nobita and his friends practice their play again but with Gian and Shizuka switching roles.

== Cast ==
Character	Japanese voice actor
Doraemon	Nobuyo Ōyama
Nobita Nobi	Noriko Ohara
Shizuka Minamoto	Michiko Nomura
Takeshi "Gian" Gōda	Kazuya Tatekabe
Suneo Honekawa	Kaneta Kimotsuki
Prince Tio	Megumi Ogata
Kuku	Mayumi Iizuka
Poporu	Kazuko Sugiyama
Ishumaru	Kōji Nakata
Kakao	Sōichirō Hoshi
Moka	Hisao Egawa
Queen (Tio's mother)	Hiroko Suzuki
Doctor	Minoru Inaba
Leader	Yōsuke Naka
Maid	Miyoko Asō
Priest	Isshin Chiba
Girl	Yui Horie
Lieutenant	Osamu Katō
Soldiers	Daiki Nakamura; Jun'ichi Sugawara
Child	Omi Minami
Yafu	Keisuke
Ketsuaru	Bin Shimada
Coretol	Masashi Hirose
Redina	Jun Karasawa
Tamako Nobi (Nobita's mother)	Sachiko Chijimatsu
Sensei	Ryōichi Tanaka
Mini-Doras	Rei Sakuma

== See also ==
- List of Doraemon films
