= Doraemon: Nobita in the Robot Kingdom =

2002 film by Tsutomu Shibayama

Doraemon the Movie: Nobita in the Robot Kingdom
- Theatrical release poster
- Directed by: Tsutomu Shibayama
- Screenplay by: Nobuaki Kishima
- Based on: Doraemon by Fujiko F. Fujio
- Produced by: Jun Kaji; Junichi Kimura; Kumi Ogura; Masatoshi Osawa; Taro Iwamoto; Toshihide Yamada
- Starring: Nobuyo Ōyama; Noriko Ohara; Michiko Nomura; Kaneta Kimotsuki; Kazuya Tatekabe
- Cinematography: Toshiyuki Umeda
- Edited by: Hajime Okayasu
- Music by: Katsumi Horii
- Production company: Shin-Ei Animation
- Distributed by: Toho
- Release date: March 9, 2002 (Japan)
- Running time: 80 minutes
- Country: Japan
- Language: Japanese
- Box office: $21.1 million

Doraemon: Nobita in the Robot Kingdom (ドラえもん のび太とロボット王国(キングダム), Doraemon Nobita to Robotto Kingudamu) also known as Doraemon the Movie 2002, is a 2002 Japanese animated science fantasy film which premiered in Japan on March 9, 2002, based on the Doraemon manga series by Fujiko F. Fujio.

It is the 23rd Doraemon film in the series. Released on a triple billing with both The Doraemons: Goal! Goal! Goal!! and The Day When I Was Born short films, it is the final film in the series to have been animated using cel animation, though the 1979 series didn't officially switch to digital animation until October of the same year.

== Plot ==
The film opens with a child playing with a robot in a faraway planet, said robot is then taken away by armed robots to undergo remodelling. It then cuts to a pair of a mother and child robot being chased by other armed robots, the mother robot is captured while the child robot along with one of the armed robots being taken into a strange portal.

Cutting once more, it shows Suneo showing off his robot dog and the main human characters talking about what robot pets they would have, with all of them making fun of Nobita for wanting a robot jellyfish. Nobita then begs both Doraemon and his mother for a pet robot to no avail. Nobita then uses the spare pocket to get a device that orders robots from the future and he accidentally orders many robots unrelated to his request along with the child robot from earlier.

The robots of the future then cause havoc in the city before being returned by Doraemon. Suneo's robot dog, which makes cat noises due to one of the robots injecting it, turns violent after Gian hits it on the head. Doraemon and his friends meet and save the strange robot child from earlier after he accidentally encounters said robot dog. After determining that he indeed doesn't come from Earth, they decide to return him back to his home planet.

Through the time machine, they reach the boy's planet after having to navigating back to his planet and evading the armed robot also stuck there. They land on the planet but fall down due to the time machine being unable to balance everyone. Down there, they meet with Dr. Capek and Kururimpa who heal the child robot and provide information about the planet. He also tells them that the robot most likely ended up on Earth due to the hyperspace.

Capek tells all of them about the history of the planet and how both humans and robots lived in harmony before Empress Jeanne's "Robot Remodelling Order" to eliminate the robot's emotions who is vengeful for the death of her father and spurred on by Dester who questions her on why the mother robot, whose name is revealed to be Maria is not yet remodelled.

The child robot reveals himself to be Poko after telling Nobita in the middle of the night, he then questions him about what happened to his mother and needs to be healed once more after trying to leave alone. Maria then tries to convince Jeanne to call off the order with seemingly no success but Dester decides he must do something about them as Maria has yet to be remodelled.

Poko then successfully leaves alone to search for Maria and is later attacked by the Queen's army. The group searches for and saves him, but Doraemon is captured in the process. He is locked up and meets Maria who explains that Jeanne's father died in an accident and how Dester has since influenced her opinion. Doraemon is then forced to fight in the robot arena but wins thanks to his gadgets and gets saved by Nobita and his friends.

They all set out for the west and are unwittingly being tracked by Dester and Jeanne, Dester then decides to get rid of Jeanne and throws her from off a cliff. Pako then saves Jeanne after finding her by accident, Nobita and his friends then find the Rainbow Valley, where humans and robots still live in harmony. Jeanne, who finally wakes up, breaks down after realizing what she had done. In the meantime, Dester usurps the throne from her.

After spending some time in the Rainbow Valley, they and the people of the valley decide to go back and repeal the order. Dester, however is informed of such and shuts down out of the palace and Jeanne realizes she had been a puppet of his the whole time. Dester then uses the palace, which transforms into a robot to attack everyone who had gathered near the palace. Nobita then uses the All Purpose Handler to control a different robot, which then defeats Dester's robot.

Doraemon attempts a rescue of Maria but Dester sends the rocket crashing into the planet's moon. However, thanks to Poko being able to hear where Maria is, Doraemon reunited with his friends and Jeanne, Maria and Poko are reunited. They also find out that Dester is Dr. Capek's younger brother. Once they repair the time machine, Nobita and his friends say goodbye to everyone in the Robot Kingdom.

The film ends with Doraemon and Nobita running to Nobita's mother, with the other main characters doing the same in the credits.

== Production team ==
- Original - Fujiko F. Fujio
- Screenplay - Nobuaki Kishima
- Director - Tsutomu Shibayama
- Major Production - Shin-Ei Animation
- Distributed by - Toho

== Cast ==
Character	Japanese voice actor
Doraemon	Nobuyo Ōyama
Nobita Nobi	Noriko Ohara
Shizuka Minamoto	Michiko Nomura
Takeshi "Gian" Gōda	Kazuya Tatekabe
Suneo Honekawa	Kaneta Kimotsuki
Poko	Houko Kuwashima
Empress Jeanne	Chiharu Niiyama
Maria	Toshiko Fujita
Doctor Chapek	Takanobu Hozumi
Kururimpa	Masako Nozawa
Onabe	Rikako Aikawa
Robbie	Banjō Ginga
Alice	Omi Minami
Kong Fighter	Daisuke Gōri
Troy	Nobuo Tobita
Connick	Konishiki Yasokichi
Dester	Shūichirō Moriyama
Droid soldiers	Jūrōta Kosugi; Toshihiko Nakajima
Time Machine navigator	Kazuko Sugiyama
Gonsuke	Bin Shimada
Future Department store clerk	Mari Maruta
Tamako Nobi	Sachiko Chijimatsu

== Soundtrack ==
=== Theme songs ===
"Doraemon no Uta" (ドラえもんのうた)
Lyrics: Takumi Kusube / Composition: Shunsuke Kikuchi / Arrangement: Shunsuke Kikuchi / Vocals: Satoko Yamano
"Isshoni Arukou ~Walking Into Sunshine~" (いっしょに歩こう 〜Walking Into Sunshine〜)
Lyrics: BANANA ICE / Composition: BANANA ICE / Arrangement: BANANA ICE, Kan Sawada / Vocals: KONISHIKI

=== Insert song ===
"Hitori Janai ~I'll Be There~" (ひとりじゃない 〜I'll Be There〜)
Lyrics: BANANA ICE / Composition: BANANA ICE / Arrangement: Kan Sawada / Vocals: KONISHIKI, Chiharu Niiyama

== See also ==
- List of Doraemon films
