= Doraemon: Nobita's Great Adventure in the South Seas =

1998 film by Tsutomu Shibayama

Doraemon the Movie: Nobita's Great Adventure in the South Seas
- Theatrical release poster
- Directed by: Tsutomu Shibayama
- Screenplay by: Nobuaki Kishima
- Based on: Doraemon by Fujiko F. Fujio
- Produced by: Jun Kaji; Junichi Kimura; Toshihide Yamada
- Starring: Nobuyo Ōyama; Noriko Ohara; Michiko Nomura; Kaneta Kimotsuki; Kazuya Tatekabe; Mach Fumiake; Yū Hayami; Yōko Asagami; Tōru Emori
- Cinematography: Toshiyuki Umeda
- Edited by: Hajime Okayasu
- Music by: Senri Ohe
- Production company: Shin-Ei Animation
- Distributed by: Toho
- Release date: March 7, 1998
- Running time: 91 minutes
- Country: Japan
- Language: Japanese
- Box office: $32.1 million

Doraemon: Nobita's Great Adventure in the South Seas (ドラえもん のび太の南海大冒険, Doraemon Nobita no Nankai Daibōuken) is a science fiction adventure film which premiered on March 7, 1998, in Japan, based on the 18th volume of the same name of the Doraemon Long Stories series. It won the Best Animation Film at the 1998 Mainichi Film Awards. It also won both the Excellent Award and Silver Award at the 16th Golden Gloss Awards. The film was nominated for best animation film in the Japanese Media Arts Festival. In late 2014, Disney XD in Southeast Asia produced and aired an English dub version of this movie. It is the first Doraemon movie released after Fujiko F. Fujio's death. It's the 19th Doraemon film. It is partly based on the 1980 chapter "South Seas Adventure".

== Plot ==
The film opens with a group of pirates searching an island for treasure who are then all captured, it then cuts to Nobita and his friends discussing about a school project themed around seas and oceans. Interested in pirate life and treasury, Nobita asks Doraemon to help him find secret treasures. Doraemon at first reject hims outright thinking it is ludicrous, but after learning news about recently discovered treasury, he helps Nobita in his sea voyage in search for the secret treasure. Bringing along Shizuka, Gian, and Suneo, they roam the Pacific Ocean while playing ship and sea danger simulators with Doraemon's gadgets.

However, Doraemon senses a time distortion that takes the group to the 16th century, where real dangerous phenomena and sea monsters begin appearing. When a whirlpool destroys the group's ship, Nobita goes missing after failing to hold on, while the others are rescued by 16th century-pirates boarding a huge pirate ship. All but a few of Doraemon's gadgets are gone following the whirlpool incident and they must assist the pirates in rescuing their comrades, with a female pirate named Betty having lost track of her brother and father and Captain Kidd, who is the leader of the company. Although Doraemon's treasure map is torn in half, the pirates learn that their map is exactly the same as their own treasure map, confirming the existence of the secret treasures.

Meanwhile, Nobita is rescued by a dolphin and taken to an island where Betty's younger brother, Jack lives. Although Nobita is unable to converse with Jack due to a language barrier, the two befriend and Nobita learns the dolphin's name, Ruffin, as well as the fact that Jack is also separated from his family, like himself. The pirate company eventually arrives at the island and begins searching for Nobita and Jack. One by one, the pirates and Doraemon's company are attacked and captured by strange creatures and security guards, eventually all but two of the pirates are captured.

After Rufin catches a glimpse of the other torn half of treasure map owned by Nobita, it quickly leads Nobita and Jack to a 22nd-century-underground facility, but are captured by security guards. It is revealed that the facility is run by a 22nd-century businessman named Cash, who creates and sells genetically altered animals for money with the help of a scientist, Dr. Clone. Ruffin is taken to be experimented in Dr. Clone's laboratory, while Nobita and Jack are thrown to jail and reunited with Doraemon and the pirate company.

The uncaptured pirates then bail all the others as well as the pirates captured at the start of the film, including Betty and Jack's father, out. Nobita and his friends go to break the control system and free Ruffin. Cash orders the genetically altered animals to attack the company, but they manage to defeat all of them. Eventually, Cash's masterpiece, a sea monster named "Leviathan" attacks the group. The sea monster swallows Doraemon and Cash, but the former manages to get himself and Cash out through the Dream Checking Machine. The sea monster crashes into the walls of the cave which contains the facility which caves in, effectively flooding it.

As the island starts sinking, the company escapes from the island with the help of Ruffin and its other dolphin friends. Cash and his company are arrested by the Time Patrol summoned by Ruffin, who is revealed to be a secret agent of them who was sent to bust out Cash and his associates. The pirates, having recovered their leader, the pirates are now rich as they have found the secret treasures on the island.

The film ends with Nobita and his friends bidding farwell, returning to the present time but not before seeing the pirates erecting a sail featuring Doraemon's face on it, by saying "Goodbye Captain Doraemon".

== Cast ==
Character	Japanese voice actor
Doraemon	Nobuyo Ōyama
Nobita Nobi	Noriko Ohara
Shizuka Minamoto	Michiko Nomura
Takeshi "Gian" Gōda	Kazuya Tatekabe
Suneo Honekawa	Kaneta Kimotsuki
Jack	Mach Fumiake
Betty	Yū Hayami
Rufin	Yōko Asagami
Captain William Kidd	Tōru Emori
Gonzalez	Kikuzō Hayashiya
Pancho	Kobuhei Hayashiya
Captain Colt	Osamu Saka
Mr. Cash	Tsunehiko Kamijō
Dr. Clone	Kōsei Tomita
Leviathan	Chafurin
News anchors	Jūrōta Kosugi; Nobuo Tobita
Computer	Naomi Nagasawa
Pirates	Toshihiko Nakajima; Isshin Chiba; Peter Stone; Paul Lukas; Dennis Falt; Patrick Harlan
Mermen	Masashi Hirose; Keiji Fujiwara; Tomokazu Seki; Hiroshi Naka; Dai Matsumoto
Tamako Nobi	Sachiko Chijimatsu
Nobisuke Nobi	Yōsuke Naka

== See also ==
- List of Doraemon films
