= Osamu Katō =

Japanese actor (1936–2017)

- 加藤 治
- Born: Yoshitoshi Katō (加藤 吉敏); January 1, 1936; Tokyo, Japan
- Died: December 18, 2017 (aged 81)
- Other name: Osamu Katō (加藤 修)
- Occupations: Actor; voice actor
- Years active: 1960–2017
- Agent: Kiraboshi
- Website: Official profile

Yoshitoshi Katō (加藤 吉敏, Katō Yoshitoshi; January 1, 1936 – December 18, 2017), known professionally as Osamu Katō (加藤 治, Katō Osamu), was a Japanese actor and voice actor. His former stage name was Osamu Katō (加藤 修).

He is notable for his voice roles in anime such as Mr. Honekawa in Doraemon, Archduke Gorgon in Mazinger Z, Dr. Katsuta in Chōdenji Robo Combattler V, Yamagatake in Dino Mech Gaiking, Tomio Tomii in Oishinbo, and The Serpent / Snake Oil Peddler in The Adventures of Tom Sawyer.

== Biography ==
Born on January 1, 1936 in Tokyo, Japan, he ended up dropping out of the Nihon University College of Art.

During his lifetime, he was affiliated with the theater company Izumiza, the Tokyo Actor's Consumer's Cooperative Society, Ezaki Productions, Aoni Production, Production Baobab, Production M3, and Kiraboshi. He also served as an auditor for the Japan Actors Union from 2007 to 2016.

=== Death ===
Katō died on December 18, 2017, at the age of 81. Regarding the obituary, Ryūsaku Chiziwa announced through his blog that it was reported in the Japan Actors Union's newsletter.

== Personality ==
His voice range was baritone.

As a voice actor, he would often played crafty villains. He is famous for his role as Tomio Tomii, also known as Deputy Director Tomii, in Oishinbo.

== Filmography ==
=== Television animation ===
List of voice performances in television animation
Year	Title	Role	Notes	Source
1966	Kaizoku Ouji	Octopus	Debut television anime role	
1967	Mach GoGoGo	Additional voice		
1968	Sabu to Ichi Torimono Hikae	Aiba Kobee Kurobee, Jinbee, Tōshichirō		
1969	Sazae-san	Additional voice		
1970	The Genie Family	Dalacin		
1971	Sarutobi Ecchan	Mohei Tenka		
1972	Devilman	Dagon	Ep. 17	
1973	Doraemon	Sensei, Mr. Honekawa	First voice of Sensei, Second voice of Mr. Honekawa	
1974	Mazinger Z	Duke Gorgon, Gonta, Dr. Watson, Jūzō Kabuto	Gonta in Ep. 30, Dr. Watson in Eps 86-87, Jūzō Kabuto in Ep. 91	
1976	Dino Mech Gaiking	Yamagakake		
1978	Treasure Island	Anderson		
1979	Doraemon	Sensei, Mr. Honekawa	Second voice of Sensei	
1980	Muteking, The Dashing Warrior	Hot-coo-saucer, Newscaster		
1981	Fang of the Sun Dougram	Hesse Carmel		
1982	Gyakuten! Ippatsuman	Silver		
1983	Ginga Hyōryū Vifam	Sergeant, Gantesu		
1984	God Mazinger	Dorado		
1985	Perman	Hozen's father, Man, Member A, Old Cloud Water		
1986	The Wonderful Wizard of Oz	Soldier with the Whiskers		
1987	Metal Armor Dragonar	Gon Jem		
1988	Oishinbo	Tomio Tomii		
1989	Let's Go! Anpanman	Snow Demon, Kong, Doronga	First voice of Snow Demon, Substitute voice of Doronga	
1991	21 Emon	Koikerasu Alien		
1993	Mobile Suit Victory Gundam	Robert Gomez		
1994	Nintama Rantarō	Fisherman, Cowardly Dayu		
1995	Mobile Suit Gundam Wing	Duke Dermail		
1998	Great Detective Conan	Mr. Nakamura, Yoshihito Kureko, Hisaemon Yaguchi	Mr. Nakamura in Eps 104-105, Yoshihito Kureko in Eps 338-339, Hisaemon Yaguchi in Ep. 539	
1999	Shūkan Storyland	Yano-kachō, Kanshu, Kyōtō		
2003	KochiKame: Tokyo Beat Cops	Ryōtsu Tamekichi, Genjiro (Santiago)		
2004	Get Ride! AM Driver	Watt Giovanni		
2011	Doraemon	The Just-Like-It-Says-on-the-Tin Seashell Set	Ep. 436	
2016	Kuma Miko: Girl Meets Bear	Hashida	Ep. 7; Final television anime role	

=== Theatrical animation ===
List of voice performances in theatrical animation
Year	Title	Role	Notes	Source
1971	Do It! Yasuji's Pornorama!!	Additional voice		
1974	Mazinger Z vs. The Great General of Darkness	Duke Gorgon, Mammothdon, Orpy, Raigorn		
1976	Puss 'n Boots Travels Around the World	Newspaper President		
1980	Ashita no Joe	Additional voice		
1981	21 Emon: Uchū e Irasshai!	Galaxy Manager		
1982	Mobile Suit Gundam III: Encounters in Space	Conscon		
1983	Fang of the Sun Dougram	Hesse Carmel		
1984	Doraemon: Nobita's Great Adventure into the Underworld	Demon		
1986	Doraemon: Nobita and the Steel Troops	Judo		
1987	Treasure Island	Anderson		
1989	Let's Go! Anpanman: The Shining Star's Tear	Doronko Maoh		
1990	Doraemon: Nobita and the Animal Planet	Company President		
1991	Doraemon: Nobita's Dorabian Nights	Cassim		
1991	Dorami-chan: Wow, The Kid Gang of Bandits!	Lord Honekawa	Short film	
1992	Hashire Melos!	Gelon		
1993	Doraemon: Nobita and the Tin Labyrinth	Nejirin Shogun		
1994	Pom Poko	Hayashi		
1995	Doraemon: Nobita's Diary on the Creation of the World	Ototo		
2000	Doraemon: Nobita and the Legend of the Sun King	Lieutenant		

=== Original video animation (OVA) ===
List of voice performances in original video animation
Year	Title	Role	Notes	Source
1989	Legend of the Galactic Heroes	Wagner	Ep. 14	
1990	B.B.	Itome	Ep. 3	
1995	The Silent Service	Tokuji Numata	Eps 1-2	
2011	Armored Trooper VOTOMS: Chirico's Return	Rosa A		
