= Doraemon: Nobita and the Knights on Dinosaurs =

1987 film by Tsutomu Shibayama

Doraemon the Movie: Nobita and the Knights on Dinosaurs
- Theatrical release poster
- Directed by: Tsutomu Shibayama
- Screenplay by: Fujiko Fujio
- Based on: Doraemon's Long Tales: Noby and the Dino Knights by Fujiko Fujio
- Produced by: Sōichi Besshi
- Starring: Nobuyo Ōyama; Noriko Ohara; Michiko Nomura; Kaneta Kimotsuki; Kazuya Tatekabe; Hideyuki Hori; Chie Kōjiro; Chikao Ōtsuka; Sachiko Chijimatsu; Kazuyo Aoki; Yoshino Ōtori
- Cinematography: Akio Sayito
- Edited by: Kazuo Inoue; Yuko Watase
- Music by: Shunsuke Kikuchi
- Production company: Shin-Ei Animation
- Distributed by: Toho
- Release date: 14 March 1987
- Running time: 91 minutes
- Country: Japan
- Language: Japanese
- Box office: $23.4 million

Doraemon: Nobita and the Knights on Dinosaurs (ドラえもん のび太と竜の騎士, Doraemon Nobita to Ryū no Kishi) is a 1987 Japanese animated epic science fiction film and the eighth feature-length Doraemon film. The film premiered in Japan on March 14, 1987 in Japan and was based on the eighth volume of the same name of the Doraemon Long Stories series. It became the highest-grossing animated film of the 1987 year and was the last Doraemon film to have its screenplay written by Fujiko Fujio before their split up that same year.

== Plot ==
Nobita argues that dinosaurs still exist, Suneo then disproves him while Gian and Shizuka take his side. He asks Doraemon for help but later gets convinced by Doraemon's gadget that dinosaurs are extinct when he asked whether there are dinosaurs alive "on" Earth. Meanwhile, he has to find a place to hide his test papers from his mother. While playing with Suneo's remote control airplane, Gian loses control of it and it falls into a river. After Gian fled, Suneo saw a huge dinosaur in the river. Fearful, he meets Doraemon and Nobita, but then runs away. Nobita and Doraemon go to the hill behind their school and Doraemon finds a tunnel using the Anywhere Hole. At night, Suneo again spots the same dinosaur in his yard but thinks he is mentally ill.

The next day, Nobita takes everyone to the tunnel. Suneo comes out of an exit and spots a herd of dinosaurs but no one believes him. The day after that they again go underground and play while Suneo comes with a camera and manages to record his plane that had crashed into the river earlier. Frightened, he runs in a cave, gets lost and gets caught by a knight riding on a dinosaur. The others end up having to hurry home as both Gian and Nobita's moms are furious after realizing they had made up an excuse to leave their house, leaving the Anywhere Hole in the empty lot.

The day later, the Anywhere Hole is virtually destroyed by a truck, preventing them from going underground again. Doraemon goes to everyone to apologize and finds that Suneo still hadn't returned home. Nobita and Doraemon watch Suneo's recordings from his recovered camera and discover that his plane is still flying in there. Everyone, at night, go to the river and find another entrance to an underworld where they are caught by native Kappas. They are saved by a knight, Banhou, who tells them that Suneo is in their capital Enriru. They go to the capital and find Suneo. Banhou tells them that their memories will be erased once they are allowed to leave.

While Banhou has to go training, he asks Roo, his sister, to show them the underworld but warns them to not go to a forbidden place. They go to museum to find that underworld humans have evolved from dinosaurs and that something or someone is the reason for the dinosaurs' extinction. They also see a perfectly rectangular area in the underworld. Roo, along with the majority of the underworld's inhabitants, are unaware of the existence of the true sky, the Sun, and stars.

While riding on a dinosaur, Nobita is accidentally taken to the forbidden building, where he finds a large ship and overhears plans to get the surface of Earth back from the mammals. Nobita returns to warn everyone and they run away. While attempting to flee from Banhou's ship, they get caught by the Kappas where they are nearly killed, but Banhou's ship comes in and saves them.

The ship turns out to be a time machine which takes them to the Cretaceous era. Revealing that the underworld people thought extraterrestrials were responsible for extinction of dinosaurs. Nobita and everyone again flee from ship and make a camp near the ship. Shizuka spots a comet approaching since they came there. Knights attack their base while the comet which they realize is the asteroid which killed off most of the dinosaurs hits earth causing a huge tsunami.

The knights rush over to the ship, which is able to hide underground, while Doraemon blasts a tunnel underground to hide from Tsunami. They realize that they made the same large rectangular place which is the size of the island of Hokkaido as seen in the map of the underworld. After the water is no longer above them, all of them come out and go back to the surface. Doraemon explains that the asteroid caused the death of the majority of the plants and plankton. Animals which are dependent on plants and other animals suffered while mammals hibernated to stay alive. The underworld people then think it was Gods that caused dinosaurs to become extinct. Doraemon then helps to make the underground world they reside in and to take all of the remaining dinosaurs there.

The film ends with the main characters being treated as heroes and sent back to the surface without having their memories erased and their stuff that was stuck underground being sent back to them each, with Nobita's mother Tamako coming across several of Nobita's tests with 0 scores on them and chases after her son and Doraemon. The tests end up falling out of her hands and both Doraemon and Nobita run after them as they fly into the sky.

== Cast ==
An English version produced and released exclusively in Malaysia by Speedy Video, features an unknown voice cast.

Character	Japanese voice actor
Doraemon	Nobuyo Ōyama
Nobita Nobi	Noriko Ohara
Shizuka Minamoto	Michiko Nomura
Suneo Honekawa	Kaneta Kimotsuki
Takeshi "Gian" Gōda	Kazuya Tatekabe
Tamako Nobi	Sachiko Chijimatsu
Mrs. Gōda	Kazuyo Aoki
Mrs. Honekawa	Yoshino Ōtori
Banhou	Hideyuki Hori
Roo	Chie Kōjiro
Head Priest	Chikao Ōtsuka
Army Commander	Nobuo Tanaka
King of France	Kinshiro Iwao
Manager	Masayuki Katō
Nanja Group	Yonehiko Kitagawa; Isamu Tanonaka; Masashi Hironaka; Ryō Horikawa; Hiroyuki Shibamoto; Tsutomu Kashiwakura
Young Boy	Youko Ogai

== See also ==
- List of films featuring dinosaurs
- List of Doraemon films
