= Doraemon: Nobita and the Windmasters =

2003 film by Tsutomu Shibayama

Doraemon the Movie: Nobita and the Windmasters
- Theatrical release poster
- Directed by: Tsutomu Shibayama
- Screenplay by: Nobuaki Kishima
- Based on: Doraemon by Fujiko F. Fujio
- Produced by: Junichi Kimura; Toshihide Yamada
- Starring: Nobuyo Ōyama; Noriko Ohara; Michiko Nomura; Kaneta Kimotsuki; Kazuya Tatekabe; Mika Kanai; Rikako Aikawa; Kumiko Nishihara; Nana Yamaguchi; Yūko Satō
- Cinematography: Toshiyuki Umeda
- Edited by: Hajime Okayasu
- Music by: Katsumi Horii
- Production company: Shin-Ei Animation
- Distributed by: Toho
- Release date: 8 March 2003 (Japan)
- Running time: 84 minutes
- Country: Japan
- Language: Japanese
- Box office: $24.7 million

Doraemon: Nobita and the Windmasters (ドラえもん のび太とふしぎ風使い, Doraemon Nobita to Fushigi Kazetsukai), also known as Doraemon and the Wind People, is a 2003 Japanese animated science fantasy film which premiered on March 8, 2003, in Japan, based on the Doraemon manga series by Fujiko F. Fujio. It is the 24th Doraemon film. It is partly based on the 1974 chapter "Phoony the Typhoon".

== Plot ==
The film opens with a mysterious tomb in a faraway land being opened by Storm Villagers, two strange spheres and the spirit of Uranda, former shaman of the village, are set free. Uranda then possesses the body of a wolf. The orange sphere ends up in Suneo's house. When it opens, a typhoon creature is set free. Suneo attempts to capture it with no success.

Meanwhile, Nobita is eating ice cream on his way back home but the typhoon snatches it and drops it on Gian. Due to this he becomes angry at Nobita and he tries to beat him up but he gets thrown into a trash can by the typhoon. The cyclone then follows Nobita to his house while Suneo still aims to capture it. Nobita thinks Doraemon brought it out and thinks its annoying after it messes with him several times.

Doraemon deduces that it is a mini typhoon, all the while it creates a mess in Nobita's room, Nobita decides to name it "Fūko" due to it being a girl, Fūko then ends up making a mess in the kitchen and annoys Nobita's mom who tells him to not keep any pets in the house. Nobita still wants to keep it and makes its appearance like a doll in a manga using the Free-Size Toy Camera. He then takes it to Shizuka to show her it, but the odd cyclone runs away after getting scolded by Nobita for blowing Shizuka's skirt up. When Nobita had given up hope of finding Fūko, she flies back to him. Suneo attempts to capture Fūko again upon seeing here again but fails.

Doraemon then finds out its food is hot air and narrowly evades it from being found out by Nobita's mother. Suneo then asks Gian for help in catching Fūko. Doraemon use the Anywhere Door to a wide space but get accidentally taken to the Wind Village. There they discover different types of creatures and save a girl from falling to their deaths, Gian and Suneo also wind up into the village taking down two storm villagers in the process who fly upon seeing more Wind Villagers. They then make friends with Temujin, his family and his friends. Suneo still tries to capture Fūko while even Gian abandons him in doing so.

In the evening, they return using the Anywhere Door, while Fūko stays in the Wind Village. Encountering the Anywhere door, Uranda also passes through it, he then possess Suneo and returns to the wind village to capture Fūko. Meanwhile, Temujin discovers the blue typhoon, which flies away and goes to Uranda.

Next day, Doraemon and his friends realize Suneo is missing and again visit the Wind Village. Upon arriving, they encounter Storm Villagers and Suneo under Uranda's control who then they attack them and in this process they capture Fūko and Gian, steal Doraemon's pocket and destroy the Anywhere Door. They attempt to go rescue them at that very moment but Temujin then advises them against it. The Storm Village traps Fūko in a prison and they have a festival celebrating it.

Meanwhile, Doraemon and his friends try to sneak into prison at night and free Gian and Fūko. Nobita falls into the pit where Fuko is in and rescues her, they all encounter Gian who helps them escape from the village. The other three return to the Wind Village while Nobita and Fuko have to be rescued by yaks who explain why both villages are fighting, warning that Uranda wants to revive Mafuuga and that he is the only who can protect Fūko. The yaks then lead Nobita to the village but Fūko gets captured by Uranda.

They then realize an event similar to that of the biblical flood will occur if Mafuuga is revived. Everyone in both the Storm and Wind Villages head for the Dragon Head Island where Mafuuga is sealed away. Upon their arrival, Uranda heads to unseal the red sphere from where Mafuuga gets its power while Doraemon and Gian try to stop him. Nobita, Shizuka and Temujin then rescue Fūko and take Doraemon's pocket back.

Doraemon and Gian are unsuccessful in their efforts and get immobilized, Uranda unseals Mafuuga's red sphere and ceases to possess Suneo's body. Nobita, Shizuka and Temujin successfully retake Doraemon's pocket and rescue Fuko. Uranda then chants a spell to recombine all three spheres which are a part of Mafuuga's body. This then causes a massive typhoon to form over the Andaman Sea, worrying the mothers of the main characters in the process. Suneo then finally wakes up and frees both Doraemon and Gian.

Uranda is then captured by a Spirit Cage and a time criminal named Doctor Storm reveals himself to everyone, he says that he came back to this period to fulfil the prophecy about Mafuuga and to create a very different 21st century. The Storm and Wind Villagers both then join forces in an attempt to stop Mafuuga, while Doraemon who gets enlarged with the Big Light does the same.

Nobita realizes that he has to use the sword on the red sphere on Mafuuga and once he does, Fūko is split off while the other two pieces remain as Mafuuga. Fūko then goes to the volcano to ignite herself and goes in the opposite direction of Mafuuga to defeat it, with everyone doing their best to assist her. Upon defeating Mafuuga, the typhoon dissipates and both Fūko and Mafuuga are killed, leaving only Fūko's doll to land in Nobita's hands.

Upon seeing Dr. Storm attempting to escape, Gian fires at his ship causing it to crash while the Time Patrol come and take him back to the 22nd century. Once the news of the typhoon disappearing reaches the news, the mothers of the main characters all take a sigh of relief. Both the Storm and Wind Villages then return home. Nobita and his friends bid goodbye to both villages and return home.

The film ends with a mini twirl of wind following Nobita, which reminds him of Fūko and him talking with his friends about it.

== Cast ==
| Character | Japanese voice actor |
|---|---|
| Doraemon | Nobuyo Ōyama |
| Nobita Nobi | Noriko Ohara |
| Shizuka Minamoto | Michiko Nomura |
| Takeshi "Gian" Gōda | Kazuya Tatekabe |
| Suneo Honekawa | Kaneta Kimotsuki |
| Fūko | Mika Kanai |
| Temujin | Rikako Aikawa |
| Sun | Kumiko Nishihara |
| Temujin and Sun's Mother | Nana Yamaguchi |
| Tomujin | Yūko Satō |
| Yamujin | Yūjin Kitagawa |
| Kunjin | Kōji Iwasawa |
| Kanjin | Yōsuke Akimoto |
| Elder | Takanobu Hozumi |
| Storm | Yusaku Yara |
| Storm's underlings | Kazunari Tanaka; Yasuhiro Takato; Yukitoshi Hori; Masashi Hirose; Hajime Koseki; Minoru Inaba |
| Uranda | Kiyoshi Kobayashi |
| Yaku | Osamu Kobayashi |
| Captain of Time Patrol | Yōsuke Naka |
| TV Announcer | Noritsugu Watanabe |
| Tamako Nobi | Sachiko Chijimatsu |
| Mrs. Gōda | Kazuyo Aoki |
| Mrs. Honekawa | Mari Yokoo |

== See also ==
- List of Doraemon films
