= Doraemon: Nobita and the Galaxy Super-express =

1996 film by Tsutomu Shibayama

Doraemon the Movie: Nobita and the Galaxy Super-Express
- Theatrical release poster
- Kanji: ドラえもん: のび太と銀河超特急(エクスプレス)
- Revised Hepburn: Doraemon; Nobita to Ginga Ekusupuresu
- Directed by: Tsutomu Shibayama
- Screenplay by: Fujiko F. Fujio
- Based on: Doraemon's Long Tales: Noby's Galactic Express by Fujiko F. Fujio
- Produced by: Sōichi Besshi; Toshihide Yamada; Junichi Kimura
- Starring: Nobuyo Ōyama; Noriko Ohara; Michiko Nomura; Kaneta Kimotsuki; Kazuya Tatekabe; Kazue Ikura; Kaneto Shiozawa; Mitsuaki Madono; Junichi Sugawara; Sakura Tange
- Narrated by: Hiroko Emori
- Cinematography: Hideko Takahashi
- Edited by: Hajime Okayasu
- Music by: Shunsuke Kikuchi
- Production company: Shin-Ei Animation
- Distributed by: Toho
- Release date: March 2, 1996 (Japan)
- Running time: 97 minutes
- Country: Japan
- Language: Japanese
- Box office: $24.9 million

Doraemon: Nobita and the Galaxy Super-Express (ドラえもん: のび太と銀河超特急(エクスプレス), Doraemon; Nobita to Ginga Ekusupuresu), also known as Doraemon and the Galaxy Express, is a 1996 Japanese animated science fiction neo-Western film and the 17th feature-length Doraemon film. It premiered in Japan on March 2, 1996, based on the 16th volume of the same name in the Doraemon Long Stories manga series.

A homage to Leiji Matsumoto's Galaxy Express 999, it was directed by Tsutomu Shibayama and was also partially based on the 1980 Doraemon manga chapter, "A Night on the Galactic Railway".

This was notably the final Doraemon film completed and released during series creator Fujiko F. Fujio's life, as he died months after the release in September 1996 while illustrating the Doraemon's Long Stories manga for the next film, Doraemon: Nobita and the Spiral City.

== Plot ==
The film opens with an unknown ship stalking a steam train travelling through space then cuts to Suneo bragging to his friends about his trip on an Express Train. Nobita appears looking very worried as Doraemon has been missing for a few days. Nobita returns home to learn that Doraemon had arrived, he explains that he had acquired tickets for a Galactic Express Train from 22nd century, where the train's destination and travelling time is unknown.

That night, Nobita and Doraemon get on the express and Nobita later expresses concerns about missing school, Doraemon reassures him that he can use the Anywhere Door and return home. The next day, Nobita invites his friends to the Galaxy Express. Gian and Shizuka agree, except Suneo, who wants them to join him instead. Though hesitant at first, Suneo also joins them. The train has 58 carriages though 8 are visible from outside. Each carriage has 5 rooms. Nobita and his friends stay in Carriage no. 7. The train engages in a mock battle where the main characters the Anywhere Door no longer works.

Once the train arrives at the destination, the carriages separate and they meet kids from the 22nd century who constantly insult them for being from the 20th century. They initially split up into three groups, with Nobita and Doraemon going to the Western planet, where they become the sheriff and defeat all the challenges, Shizuka going to the Fantasy planet where she is the first picked out of seven Snow Whites while Gian and Suneo go to the Ninja planet where they fail miserably even with a tool that lets them cheat. Once they are all done, they decide to visit the Dinosaur planet on the next day.

Meanwhile, an evil force of parasites called Yadori which had spied on the express train earlier plan to make humans their hosts by taking over their bodies. On the day the main characters visit the Dinosaur planet, a parasite takes over the person who works at the Control Center, another parasite also takes over one of the kids from the 22nd century and leaves the others on an outlying asteroid.

The main characters figure out something is wrong once all of the dinosaur robots stop working. They decide to report about it to the Control Center in the main planet but have to flee when all of the dinosaur robots are out to attack them. When they arrive back in the main planet, they find out smoke coming out from the Main Control Center. When Gian and Suneo are in the main control center to investigate what happened, Suneo is captured by the parasites and taken control by Yadori 009. Yadori 009 tricks his friends and locks them up after which Yadori 007 reveals that Yadori is set to conquer the galaxy. After most of the Yadori force leave, the captain of the train rescues the captives, imprisons Yadori 009 and decides to take the train to another planet for safety.

However, the train crashes en route on an abandoned planet. On the planet, the captain finds an electronic cave map which Gian later follows to explore caves, but ends up getting lost along with two future kids. Shizuka, who earlier unknowingly defeated a Yadori with a gun, finds another anti-Yadori gun which they use on Yadori 009, who has jumped from Suneo's body to Nobita's. They also relocate Gian through his footprints and manage to get the train out of the mountain. Gian also discovers the two other kids from the 22nd century and a train stuck in the cave, he then uses the tool from the Ninja planet to escape.

When they are preparing to leave, Yadori force finds and attacks them resulting in a large battle, the humans then shoot their anti-Yadori guns and free all of the humans under their control, however the main leader of the Yadori then uses a gigantic robot which could not be defeated using the gun leading to the humans fleeing. Nobita, however hides behind a rock and when the leader attempts to take control of him, Nobita shoots and kills the leader.

The film ends with the future kids reconciling with Nobita and his group, when they group arrive back on Earth in the 20th century, they bid farewell to the Galaxy Express.

== Cast ==
Character	Japanese voice actor
Doraemon	Nobuyo Ōyama
Nobita Nobi	Noriko Ohara
Shizuka Minamoto	Michiko Nomura
Suneo Honekawa	Kaneta Kimotsuki
Takeshi "Gian" Gōda	Kazuya Tatekabe
Tamako Nobi	Sachiko Chijimatsu
Conductor	Kazue Ikura
Baum	Kaneto Shiozawa
Aston	Mitsuaki Madono
Don	Junichi Sugawara
Jane	Sakura Tange
Yadori	Yōsuke Akimoto; Hiroshi Ishida; Daiki Nakamura
Heavenly King	Kenji Utsumi
Mayor	Yōsuke Naka
Referee	Minoru Yada
Curator	Ryōichi Tanaka
Ninja's Sensei	Koichi Kitamura
Custodian	Toshiyuki Morikawa
Guide	Yuri Amano
Guide card	Mari Maruta
Car sensor	Rei Sakuma
Prince	Masami Kikuchi
Gunman	Toshiharu Sakurai
Passengers	Kazuyuki Ishikawa; Toshiaki Doi; Akie Sekine; Yuka Imai

== See also ==
- List of Doraemon films
