= Hustle Punch =

Japanese anime television series

- ハッスルパンチ
- Genre: Adventure
- Created by: Yasuji Mori
- Written by: Hiroshi Ikeda; Motonari Wakai
- Directed by: Hiroshi Ikeda
- Music by: Asei Kobayashi
- Country of origin: Japan
- Original language: Japanese
- No. of episodes: 26

Production
- Producers: Yu Saito; Yoshifumi Hatao
- Production company: Toei Animation

Original release
- Network: NET
- Release: November 1, 1965 – April 25, 1966

Hustle Punch (ハッスルパンチ; Hassuru Panchi) is a Japanese adventure anime series created by Yasuji Mori and produced by Toei Animation. Its 26 episodes were aired on November 1, 1965, to April 25, 1966, on NET.

== Plot ==
The plot involves the adventures of three friends, Punch (a bear), Touch (a mouse), and Bun (a weasel), who all live in a scrapyard by themselves. Each episode has the three main characters stop the evil plans of Doctor Galigari, a wolf who wants to build his own city over their hometown, including the scrapyard.

== Characters ==
Punch (パンチ)
Voiced by: Nobuyo Ōyama
The titular main character, Punch is an orphan bear who is literally hard-headed, making it impossible for him to be hit on the head, much to his advantage. Punch also uses his head to break holes in walls, having to just run into the wall with his head in front and smash through. He may be the oldest of the trio as he is capable of driving a car and even an airplane (though it might attribute more to his size than age since he's also the tallest).
Touch (タッチ)
Voiced by: Yoko Mizugaki
A mouse who is really into fashion and jewelry. Because of her small size, she often sneaks in and out through small spaces, usually to help out Punch and Bun. She even uses her cute charms to get Nu to help her out, mostly whenever she is in Galigari's clutches.
Bun (ブン)
Voiced by: Chiharu Kuri
A weasel who uses a slingshot as a weapon, and is an expert shot. In the English-sub, he is identified as "Boom".
Doctor Galigari (ガリガリ博士, Garigari Hakase)
Voiced by: Jōji Yanami
The main antagonist, Galigari is a wolf and a professional inventor who uses his devices to commit crimes such as robbing banks or making counterfeit money. His main goal is to wipe out the city in order to make his own town in honor of his ancestors. He first plans on getting rid of the scrapyard where Punch, Touch, and Bun live, which is why the kids make sure his plans always fail. Dr. Garigari would later reappear a decade later as an antagonist in Toei's third Puss in Boots film, Puss 'n Boots Travels Around the World, released in 1976.
Black (ブラック)
Voiced by: Hiroshi Ōtake
A black cat who is one of Garigari's henchmen. He often carries around a pistol to threaten the orphans, but he always misses his targets due to his poor shooting skills. This often leads to Bun teasing him, which annoys him. While Black is boastful and self-confident, when Garigari is around, he is easily frightened.
Nu (ヌー)
Voiced by: Takuzou Kamiyama
Garigari's other henchmen who is a dimwitted pig. While Nu respects Black and follows Garigari's orders out of fear, sometimes he shows a soft side towards the orphans, especially Touch, who often flatters him into doing something for her and her friends.

== Episode listing ==
No.	Title	Original release date
1	"Throw Out the Trash!"; Transliteration: "Jamamono wa Oidase" (Japanese: じゃまものは追い出せ)	November 1, 1965
2	"Red Star Caper"; Transliteration: "Reddosutā no Kanata" (Japanese: レッドスターの彼方)	November 8, 1965
3	"Black Benny's Secret"; Transliteration: "Burakkubenī no Himitsu" (Japanese: ブラックベニーの秘密)	November 15, 1965
4	"Run! Ponzka"; Transliteration: "Hashire! Pontsukā" (Japanese: 走れ!ポンツカー)	November 22, 1965
5	"Following a Mysterious Thief"; Transliteration: "Nazo no Kaitō o Oe" (Japanese: 謎の怪盗を追え)	November 29, 1965
6	"Disappeared Wallet"; Transliteration: "Kieta Satsutaba" (Japanese: 消えた札束)	December 6, 1965
7	"Garigari's Voyage"; Transliteration: "Garigari Gō Kōkaigi" (Japanese: ガリガリ号航海記)	December 13, 1965
8	"Large Circus Big Circus"; Transliteration: "Sokonuke dai Sākasu" (Japanese: 底抜け大サーカス)	December 20, 1965
9	"Braggart Black"; Transliteration: "Horafuki Burakku" (Japanese: ほらふきブラック)	December 27, 1965
10	"Find a Donut"; Transliteration: "Dōnattsu o sagase" (Japanese: ドーナッツを探せ)	January 3, 1966
11	"Bell and Dynamite"; Transliteration: "Suzu to Dainamaito" (Japanese: 鈴とダイナマイト)	January 10, 1966
12	"Petanco's Uproar"; Transliteration: "Pettanko Sōdō" (Japanese: ペッタンコ騒動)	January 17, 1966
13	"Animal Remodeling Machine"; Transliteration: "Dōbutsu Kaizōki" (Japanese: 動物改造機)	January 24, 1966
14	"Chisel the Highway"; Transliteration: "Haiuei o Suttoba Se" (Japanese: ハイウェイをすっとばせ)	January 31, 1966
15	"Cheers with Shackling Extract"; Transliteration: "Shakkuriekisu de Kanpai" (Japanese: シャックリエキスで乾杯)	February 7, 1966
16	"A Longing to Travel Abroad"; Transliteration: "Akogare no Gaikoku Ryokō" (Japanese: あこがれの外国旅行)	February 14, 1966
17	"Kuroko and a Necklace"; Transliteration: "Kyūkanchō to Nekkuresu" (Japanese: 九官鳥とネックレス)	February 21, 1966
18	"The Legacy of the Garigari Family"; Transliteration: "Garigari Ie no Isan" (Japanese: ガリガリ家の遺産)	February 28, 1966
19	"Catch Up Big Things"; Transliteration: "Ōmono wo Tsuriagero" (Japanese: 大物を釣り上げろ)	March 7, 1966
20	"A Very Happy Day"; Transliteration: "Totemo Yukaina Hi" (Japanese: とても愉快な日)	March 14, 1966
21	"Do You Want to Fly Away?"; Transliteration: "Tobase te Tamaru Ka" (Japanese: 飛ばせてたまるか)	March 21, 1966
22	"I'm Superman"; Transliteration: "Boku wa Sūpāman" (Japanese: 僕はスーパーマン)	March 28, 1966
23	"Where is the Buddha?"; Transliteration: "Bakudan wa Doko Da" (Japanese: ばくだんは何処だ)	April 4, 1966
24	"Mischief Hypnotism"; Transliteration: "Itazura Saiminjutsu" (Japanese: いたずら催眠術)	April 11, 1966
25	"Earthquake Sells"; Transliteration: "Jishin Urimasu" (Japanese: 地震売ります)	April 18, 1966
26	"Peshanco Large Race"; Transliteration: "Peshanko dai Rēsu" (Japanese: ペシャンコ大レース)	April 25, 1966

== Home media ==
The complete series was released on DVD on January 25, 2006. A digital remaster version in DVD box set was later released on February 26, 2016.
