= Ali Baba and the Forty Thieves (1971 film) =

- Japanese DVD cover art
- アリババと40匹の盗賊
- Directed by: Hiroshi Shidara
- Written by: Morihisa Yamamoto
- Production company: Toei Animation
- Distributed by: Toei Company
- Release date: 18 July 1971
- Running time: 55 minutes
- Country: Japan
- Language: Japanese

Ali Baba and the Forty Thieves (アリババと40匹の盗賊, Ari Baba to Yonjūppiki no Tōzoku) is a 1971 anime film by Toei Animation, retelling the evergreen story of Ali Baba and the Forty Thieves from the Arabian Nights, or One Thousand and One Nights.

It was directed by Hiroshi Shidara and written by Morihisa Yamamoto. Hayao Miyazaki played a decisive role in developing structure, characters and designs for this film, whose credits list him as Key Animator and Organizer. Seiichiro Uno wrote original music for the film.

It was released on 18 July 1971 in Japan. Other releases followed, including:

- West Germany (as Ali Cats und der fliegende Professor, on 16 March 1973)
- Italy (as Ali Babà e i 40 ladroni)
- USA (a dubbed version called Alibaba's Revenge)
- International English version (Ali Baba and the Forty Thieves)
- Spain (as Ali Babà i els 40 lladres; in Central Catalan, aired in TV3 on March 12th 1994; in Valencian Catalan in Canal Nou, on 13 November 1993).

== Plot ==
The story is about a little boy who is the descendant of the leader of the thieves who met their fate in the 1001 Nights. He joins forces with a mouse and 38 cats to form the 40 thieves whose sole purpose is to steal back their rightful treasure from Ali Baba the 33rd. The tyrannical Ali Baba being nearly broke as he has spent most of the money his father left him, finds a magic lamp which is inhabited by an ailurophobic genie who cannot work his magic unless all the cats in the kingdom are gone. The boy and his companions, plan to save the jailed cats, to get back the stolen treasures from Ali Baba and saving the oppressed people from his tyranny.

== Cast ==
Character	Original	English
Goro	Gorō Naya	Arthur Grosser
Kajiru/Nibbler	Junpei Takiguchi	A.J. Henderson
Police Chief	Isamu Tanonaka	Unknown
Spirit of the Lamp	Kousei Tomita	Neil Shee
Dora/Tom	Kenji Utsumi	Rob Roy
Alibaba/King Ali Baba the 33rd	Chikao Ohtsuka	Unknown
Huck/Ali Huck	Nobuyo Ôyama	Unknown

=== Additional Voices ===
- Original: Masao Imanishi, Kunihiko Kitagawa, Ichirō Nagai, Michiko Nomura, Hiroshi Odake, Shunji Yamada
- English: Dean Hagopian, A.J. Henderson, Neil Shee, Jane Woods
