= Sodanyaku =

Japanese corporate advisor

Sōdanyaku (相談役; lit. "official advisor") is a title given to senior members of Japanese companies and non-profit organizations. A sodanyaku is often a former president or chairman of the organization who has relinquished day-to-day control of the organization but continues to offer advice to its full-time managers. An advisor may be, but is not always, a director of the organization. Similar titles include chief consultant (最高顧問, saikō komon) and advisor emeritus (名誉相談役, meiyo sōdanyaku).
