= Yoshino Ōtori =

Japanese actress and voice actress (born 1947)

- 鳳 芳野
- Born: March 19, 1947 (age 79); Yokohama, Kanagawa Prefecture, Japan
- Other name: Miki Kagawa (加川 三起)
- Occupations: Actress; voice actress
- Years active: 1970–present
- Agent: Ken Production
- Website: Official profile

Yoshino Ōtori (鳳 芳野, Ōtori Yoshino; born March 19, 1947) is a Japanese actress and voice actress affiliated with Ken Production. She was formerly credited as Miki Kagawa (加川 三起, Kagawa Miki).

== Filmography ==
=== Television animation ===
1976

- Yōkai-den Nekomekozō as Mineko

1977

- Muteki Chōjin Zambot 3 as Sumie Koe, Kimiko Kamikita & Michi

1978

- Muteki Kōjin Daitarn 3 as Commander Sumika

1979

- Doraemon as Mrs. Honekawa
- Mobile Suit Gundam as Colin childcare officer
- Koguma no Misha as Magomago
- Toshi Gordian as Elias, Toropinu

1980

- Space Warrior Baldios as Doctor Era Quinstein

1981

- Wanwan Sanjushi as Francois's mother

1982

- The Super Dimension Fortress Macross as Linn Feichun, Moruk Laplamiz, Yoshio (ep 1)

1983

- Akū Daisakusen Srungle as Semiira
- Miyuki as Insurance doctor

1985

- Saber Rider and the Star Sheriffs as Moro
- Shōwa Ahōzoshi Akanuke Ichiban! as Happo Rika

1990

- My Daddy Long Legs as Sloane
- Obatarian as Sayuri

2000

- Fighting Spirit as Kimura's mother

2002

- RahXephon as Nanny
- Getbackers as Kazuki's Mother

2004

- The Melody of Oblivion as Old Lady's Voice
- Rozen Maiden as Matsu Shibasaki
- Fafner in the Azure as Hester Gallop

2005

- Rozen Maiden: Träumend as Matsu Shibasaki

2006

- Nishi no Yoki Majo - Astraea Testament (Tabitha Holy)
- Pénélope tête en l'air as Grandma

2007

- Moonlight Mile as Elizabeth Korsakov
- Romeo × Juliet as Ariel

2009

- Slap Up Party -Arad Senki- as Dark Elf General
- Kiddy Girl-and as Grandmother

2010

- Strike Witches 2 as Anna Ferrara

2015

- Fafner in the Azure: Exodus as Hester Gallop

2016

- Maho Girls PreCure! as Head Teacher

2018

- Pocket Monsters: Sun & Moon as Naganadel

2019

- Chihayafuru 3 as Taeko Miyauchi

=== Theatrical animation ===
- Doraemon: Nobita's Dinosaur (1980) as Mrs. Honekawa/Suneo's Mama
- Doraemon: Nobita and the Castle of the Undersea Devil (1983) as Mrs. Honekawa/Suneo's Mama
- Doraemon: Nobita and the Steel Troops (1986) as Mrs. Honekawa/Suneo's Mama
- Doraemon: Nobita and the Knights on Dinosaurs (1987) as Mrs. Honekawa/Suneo's Mama
- Doraemon: Nobita's Dorabian Nights (1991) as Mrs. Honekawa/Suneo's Mama
- The Super Dimension Fortress Macross: Do You Remember Love? as Moruk Lap Lamiz

=== Tokusatsu ===
1985

- Dengeki Sentai Changeman as Miraleca

=== Dubbing ===
- Cube 2: Hypercube as Mrs. Paley (Barbara Gordon)
- Ghost World as Roberta Allsworth (Illeana Douglas)
- Mac and Me as Linda (Laura Waterbury)
- Only Murders in the Building as Rose Cooper (Shirley MacLaine)
- Untraceable as Stella Marsh (Mary Beth Hurt)
- Zombi 2 (1982 TBS edition) as Paola Menard (Olga Karlatos)
