= List of Doraemon video games =

Many Doraemon video games were released for most video game systems in Japan. The following is a list of these.

== Other platforms ==
Title	Platform	Publisher	Genre	Release date
Doraemon Yūjō Densetsu	3DO	Shogakukan	Role-playing	April 7, 1995
Doraemon	Arcadia 2001	Bandai Co., Ltd.	Bandai Co., Ltd.	1983
Doraemon Nobita's Time Machine the Great Adventure	Super Cassette Vision	Epoch Co.	Epoch Co.	1985
Doraemon (Famicom)	Family Computer	Hudson Soft	Action	December 12, 1986
Doraemon: Giga Zombie no Gyakushū	Family Computer	Epoch	-	September 14, 1990
Doraemon: Nobita to Yousei no Kuni	Super Famicom	Epoch	Jump'n Run with RPG Overworld	February 19, 1993
Doraemon 2: Nobita to Torairando no Kiki	Super Famicom	Epoch	Jump'n Run with RPG Overworld	December 19, 1993
Doraemon 3: Nobita to Toki no Hougyoku	Super Famicom	Epoch	-	December 16, 1994
Doraemon 4: Nobita in the Moon Kingdom	Super Famicom	Epoch	-	December 15, 1995
Doraemon: Nobita to Mittsu no Seireiseki	Nintendo 64	Epoch	-	March 21, 1997
Doraemon 2: Nobita to Hikari no Shinden	Nintendo 64	Epoch	-	December 11, 1998
Doraemon 3: Nobita no Machi SOS!	Nintendo 64	Epoch	-	July 28, 2000
Boku, Doraemon	Dreamcast	Sega Toys	Life simulation, Adventure	January 25, 2001
Doraemon: Minna de Asobō! Minidorando	GameCube	Epoch	-	July 18, 2003
Doraemon - Taiketsu Himitsu Dogu!!	Game Boy	Epoch	-	March 1, 1991
Doraemon 2 - Animal Wakusei Densetsu	Game Boy	Epoch	-	December 19, 1992
Doraemon Kart	Game Boy	Epoch	-	March 20, 1998
Doraemon no Game Boy de Asobouyo: Deluxe 10	Game Boy	Epoch	-	November 27, 1998
Doraemon no Study Boy 1: Shouichi Koguko Kanji	Game Boy	Epoch	-	1997
Doraemon no Study Boy 2: Shouichi Sansuu Keisan	Game Boy	Epoch	-	1997
Doraemon no Study Boy 3: Ku Ku Master	Game Boy	Epoch	-	1997
Doraemon no Study Boy 4: Shouni Kokugo Kanji	Game Boy	Epoch	-	1997
Doraemon no Study Boy 5: Shouni Sansuu Keisan	Game Boy	Epoch	-	1997
Doraemon no Study Boy 6: Gakushuu Kanji Master 1006	Game Boy	Epoch	-	1998
Doraemon Kart 2	Game Boy Color	Epoch	-	March 12, 1999
Doraemon: Aruke Aruke Labyrinth	Game Boy Color	Epoch	-	July 23, 1999
Doraemon Memories: Nobita no Omoide Daibouken	Game Boy Color	Epoch	-	March 10, 2000
Doraemon no Quiz Boy	Game Boy Color	Shogakukan	-	April 28, 2000
Doraemon no Study Boy: Kuku Game	Game Boy Color	Shogakukan	-	December 20, 2000
Doraemon no Study Boy: Gakushuu Kanji Game	Game Boy Color	Shogakukan	-	January 12, 2001
Doraemon: Kimi to Pet no Monogatari	Game Boy Color	Epoch	-	March 16, 2001
Doraemon no Quiz Boy 2	Game Boy Color	Shogakukan	-	October 4, 2002
Doraemon no Study Boy: Kanji Yomikaki Master	Game Boy Color	Shogakukan	-	July 18, 2003
Doraemon: Green Planet: The Pounding Great Rescue!	Game Boy Advance	Epoch	-	April 27, 2001
Doraemon Board Game	Game Boy Advance	Epoch	-	May 29, 2002
Doraemon: Nobita's Dinosaur 2006 DS	Nintendo DS	Sega	-	March 2, 2006
Doraemon: Nobita no Shin Makai Daibouken DS	Nintendo DS	Sega	-	March 8, 2007
Dorabesu Dramatic Stadium Doraemon Choyakyu Gaiden	Nintendo DS	Bandai Namco Entertainment	Sports, Baseball	December 20, 2007
Nobita and the Green Giant Legend DS	Nintendo DS	Sega	-	March 6, 2008
Doragana	Nintendo DS	-	-	November 22, 2008
Dorabase 2: Nettou Ultra Stadium	Nintendo DS	Bandai Namco Entertainment	Sports, Baseball, Role-playing	November 19, 2009
Dora-Chie: Mini-Dora Ongakutai to 7-tsu no Chie	Nintendo 3DS	-	-	-
Doraemon: Nobita to Kiseki no Shima	Nintendo 3DS	-	-	-
Doraemon: Nobita no Himitsu Dougu Hakubutsukan	Nintendo 3DS	-	-	-
Doraemon: Shin Nobita no Daimakyou	Nintendo 3DS	-	-	-
Doraemon: Nobita's Space Heroes	Nintendo 3DS	-	-	-
Doraemon: Nobita and the Birth of Japan 2016	Nintendo 3DS	-	-	-
Doraemon: Nobita's Great Adventure in the Antarctic Kachi Kochi	Nintendo 3DS	-	-	-
Doraemon: Nobita's Teasure Island	Nintendo 3DS	-	-	-
DoraKazu: Nobita no Suuji Daibouken	Nintendo 3DS	-	-	-
Doraeigo: Nobita to Yousei no Fushigi Collection	Nintendo 3DS	-	-	-
Fujiko F. Fujio Characters Daishuugou! SF Dotabata Party!!	Nintendo 3DS	-	-	-
DoraMoji: Nobita no Kanji Daisakusen	Nintendo 3DS	-	-	-
Kaite Oboeru: DoraGana	Nintendo 3DS	-	-	-
Hyakumasu Dora-San Nobita no Time Battle	Nintendo 3DS	-	-	-
Doraemon: Yume Dorobou to 7 Nin no Gozans	Sega Genesis	Sega	Platformer	March 26, 1993
Doraemon: Nobita to Fukkatsu no Hoshi	Sega Saturn	Epoch	Action	March 15, 1996
Doraemon - Nobita to Maigo no Kyouryuu	Sega Pico	Sega	Educational	1993
Doraemon - Nobita no Machinaka Dokidoki Tanken!	Sega Pico	Sega	Educational	1994
Kuizu ni Charenji! Doraemon	Sega Pico	Sega	Educational, Table	1995
Doraemon Time Machine de Daibouken!	Sega Pico	Shogakukan	Educational	October 27, 1995
Yobeba Kotaeru Doraemon: Nobita to Himitsu Dougu o Mitsukeyou!	Sega Pico	Sega	Educational	1997
Doraemon Youchien wa Tanoshii na	Sega Pico	Shogakukan	Educational, Ethics	May 1997
Doraemon Ensoku-Imohori-Undoukai	Sega Pico	Shogakukan	Educational, Ethics	September 1997
Hajimema Series 6 Quiz ni Challenge! Doraemon	Sega Pico	Sega	Educational, Table	1998
Issho ni Utaou! Doraemon Wakuwaku Karaoke	Sega Pico	Sega Toys	Educational	1998
Doraemon Yometayo-Kaketayo Hiragana Katakana	Sega Pico	Shogakukan	Educational, Language	August 31, 1999
Itsudemoisho Doraemon Set	Sega Pico	Sega Toys	Educational	December 23, 1999
Doraemon Kazoete-Kanzan Kazu Tokei	Sega Pico	Shogakukan	Educational, Arithmetic	September 2001
Doraemon Eigo de Asobou ABC	Sega Pico	Shogakukan	Educational, English	July 2002
Doraemon Chiiku Asobi Dorarando	Sega Pico	Shogakukan	Educational	July 18, 2003
Doraemon Tanoshiku O-keiko Hiragana Katakana	Sega Advanced Pico Beena	Sega Toys	Educational, Language	October 2005
Doraemon Tanoshii Enseikatsu Yōchien Hoikuen	Sega Advanced Pico Beena	Sega Toys	Educational, Life	March 2006
Doraemon Chinō Daikaihatsu! Wakuwaku Gēmu Rando	Sega Advanced Pico Beena	Sega Toys	Educational	October 2006
Doraemon Wakuwaku Sekai Isshū Gēmu ~Asonde Oboeru Chizu Kokki~	Sega Advanced Pico Beena	Sega Toys	Educational, Knowledge (Geography)	April 1, 2010

Many LCD handhelds, such as Dokodemo Dorayaki Doraemon, were also released.

== Super Cassette Vision ==
- Doraemon Nobita's Time Machine the Great Adventure

== Virtual Boy ==
- Doraemon: Nobita no Doki Doki! Obake Land (cancelled)

== Arcade ==
- Doraemon no Eawase Montage (cancelled)
- Doraemon's Anywhere Door / Doraemon no Dokodemodoa

and more...

== Game Boy Advance ==
Doraemon Board Game

== Wii ==
- Doraemon Wii

== Wii U ==
- Fujiko F. Fujio Characters Daishuugou! SF Dotabata Party!!

== Sega Mega Drive ==
- Doraemon: Yume Dorobou to 7 Nin no Gozans

== Sega Saturn ==
- Doraemon: Nobita to Fukkatsu no Hoshi

== Dreamcast ==
- Boku, Doraemon

== Game Gear ==
- Doraemon: Wakuwaku Pocket Paradise
- GG Doraemon: Nora no Suke no Yabou

== PlayStation ==
- Doraemon 2: SOS! Otogi no Kuni
- Doraemon 3: Makai no Dungeon
- Doraemon: Nobitaito Fukkatsu no Hoshi
- Kids Station: Doraemon: Himitsu no Yojigen Pocket

== PlayStation 4 ==
- Doraemon: Nobita's Ranch Story / Doraemon: Story of Seasons
- Doraemon Dorayaki Shop Story

== PC Engine ==
- Doraemon: Meikyū Daisakusen
- Doraemon Nobita no Dorabian Nights

== PC Engine Super CD-ROM² ==
- Doraemon Nobita no Dorabian Nights

== 3DO ==
- Doraemon Yūjō Densetsu

== WonderSwan Color ==
- Pocket no Chuu no Doraemon

== Microsoft Windows (PC) ==
- Doraemon Monopoly
- Paso Pico: Doraemon: Nobita no Machinaka Doki Doki Tanken!
- Paso Pico: Doraemon: Nobita to Himitsu Dougu o Mitsukeyou!
- Paso Pico: Doraemon: Nobita to Maigo no Kyouryuu
- Paso Pico: Doraemon: Time Machine de Daibouken!
- Doraemon: Nobita's Ranch Story / Doraemon: Story of Seasons
- Doraemon Dorayaki Shop Story
- Doraemon: Nobita's Resident Evil

== iOS/Android ==
- Glico x Stand By Me Doraemon (discontinued)
- Glico Coloring (discontinued)
- Run Nobita Run
- Doraemon Fishing 2 / Doraemon Fishing 2+ / Doraemon Fishing 2 HD / Doraemon Fishing 2 - Nobita's Dinosaur Adventure / Doraemon Fishing 2S / Doraemon Fat Cat Fishing / Doraemon Dino Fishing
- Doraemon Gadget Rush
- Doraemon MusicPad
- Doraemon Repair Shop
- Doraemon Repair Shop Seasons
- Doraemon Comic World
- Doraemon Doublixir
- Doraemon Badge Blast
- Doraemon Time Travel Dream
- Nabati Petualangan Doraemon
- Choi Choi Doraemon
- Doraemon: Oyako de Sūji Asobi
- Doraemon: Oyako de Kanji Asobi
- Disney Sorcerer’s Arena (upcoming legendary event)
- Doraemon Dorayaki Shop Story

== Nintendo Switch ==
- Doraemon: Nobita's Chronicle of the Moon Exploration
- Doraemon: Nobita's Little Star Wars 2021
- Doraemon: Nobita's New Dinosaur
- Doraemon: Nobita's Ranch Story / Doraemon: Story of Seasons
- Doraemon Dorayaki Shop Story

== Xbox One ==
- Doraemon Dorayaki Shop Story

== Xbox Series X/S ==
- Doraemon Dorayaki Shop Story
