= Doraemon: Nobita's Dorabian Nights =

1991 film by Tsutomu Shibayama

Doraemon the Movie: Nobita's Dorabian Nights
- Theatrical release poster
- Directed by: Tsutomu Shibayama
- Screenplay by: Fujiko F. Fujio
- Based on: Doraemon's Long Tales: Noby's Dorabian Nights by Fujiko F. Fujio
- Produced by: Sōichi Besshi; Yoshiaki Koizumi; Toshihide Yamada
- Starring: Nobuyo Ōyama; Noriko Ohara; Michiko Nomura; Kaneta Kimotsuki; Kazuya Tatekabe; Minori Matsushima; Seizō Katō; Osamu Katō; Jun Hazumi
- Cinematography: Akio Saitô
- Edited by: Kazuo Inoue; Yuko Watase
- Music by: Shunsuke Kikuchi
- Production company: Shin-Ei Animation
- Distributed by: Toho
- Release date: 9 March 1991 (Japan)
- Running time: 99 minutes
- Country: Japan
- Language: Japanese
- Box office: $28.0 million

Doraemon: Nobita's Dorabian Nights (ドラえもん のび太のドラビアンナイト, Doraemon: Nobita no Dorabian Naito), also known as Doraemon Nights, is a 1991 Japanese animated science fantasy film which premiered on 9 March 1991 in Japan, based on the 11th volume of the same name of the Doraemon Long Stories series. It's the 12th Doraemon film.

== Plot ==
The movie begins with Nobita and Doraemon experiencing the tale of Sinbad of the Arabian Nights using a storybook gadget for the 3rd time, but Nobita becomes bored by just watching it from afar. He tries to invite Shizuka Minamoto to enter the storybooks of other tales and accidentally brings Takeshi "Gian" Goda and Suneo Honekawa along. Gian and Suneo mess up the storybooks to create a "fresh" tale, which causes Nobita and Shizuka to experience a mishmash of various tales that Shizuka dislikes. Attempting to leave, she is knocked out by Sinbad's magic carpet and falls into the desert. Nobita then has to exit once his mother tells him to clean up the mess of the storybooks on the floor.

The next day, Doraemon realizes that Shizuka hadn't returned and while searching for her, the original storybook gets destroyed and Nobita dreams that Shizuka was taken as a slave on a ship. The other main four characters then decide to stage a rescue mission by going to 8th century Baghdad, during the reign of caliph Harun al-Rashid, after Doraemon confirms that the world of the Arabian Nights does indeed coincide with the 8th century Abbasid Caliphate. Posing as foreign traders and servants, Nobita, Doraemon, Gian, and Suneo are rescued from Cassim and his bandits by the caliph himself, who gives a permit that allows them to travel from the port of Basra. Initially, the four are accompanied by Mikujin, a guide genie, but the latter goes upset when they insult him due to his incompetence and leaves but still tracks them just in case. After purchasing a ship, however, the group are double-crossed by the trader, who reveals himself to be Cassim, and are thrown overboard.

Waking up on the shore of the Arabian Desert, the four are forced to walk through it because Doraemon's pocket which was taken by Cassim while Cassim and two of his minions face the same situation and abandon Doraemon's pocket once they are unable to figure out how to use its gadgets. However, they are rescued by a gigantic genie commandeered by Sinbad, who reigns over a marvelous city in the desert presented by an anonymous time traveler from the future. With his magical gadgets, Sinbad helps the four rescue Shizuka from a bandit named Abdil who tried to present her to Sinbad as a gift. Vowing revenge, Abdil meets with Cassim and his two minions to search for the lost city. It is then revealed that Abdil was the only visitor to Sinbad's city who remembers its location, because when Sinbad urged him to drink a memory potion after the visit, he spewed it away.

After arriving through a secret passage, Abdil and Cassim swiftly enter the city given to Sinbad, whom they attempt to lock out. Once they do get in, both groups race to get the gigantic genie which Abdil gets and uses it on Doraemon's group who then get locked up. Mikujin returns and helps the group with Doraemon's pocket, which he recovered from the desert, from where they escape but run past where the time hole is located and are locked out once again. While out of the city, Sinbad loses all hope but regains it after the main characters tell him to be like the person from his past. The group eventually manage to get back inside and defeat both Abdil and Cassim, retaking the city while their memories are erased properly this time. Despite Sinbad's offer for them to remain by not erasing their memories with the memory potion, Nobita and his friends bid him farewell before returning to the present day, though they all also return to play along with Mikujin in the end credits.

== Cast ==
Character	Japanese voice actor
Doraemon	Nobuyo Ōyama
Nobita Nobi	Noriko Ohara
Shizuka Minamoto	Michiko Nomura
Suneo Honekawa	Kaneta Kimotsuki
Takeshi "Gian" Gōda	Kazuya Tatekabe
Tamako Nobi	Sachiko Chijimatsu
Michiko Minamoto	Masako Matsubara
Mrs. Honekawa	Yoshino Ōtori
Sinbad	Osamu Saka
Mikujin	Minori Matsushima
Abdil	Seizō Katō
Cassim	Osamu Katō
Cassim's Henchmens	Reizo Nomoto; Takashi Taguchi
Soldier	Shozo Iizuka
Harun al-Rashid	Jun Hazumi
Genie of the Lamp	Teiyu Ichiryusai
Genie of the Bottle	Daisuke Gouri
Q-Tarō	Fusako Amachi
Young Sindbad	Hirohiko Kakegawa
Jack	Hiroko Emori
Fairy	Yoshino Takamori
Witch	Kyoko Yamada
Merchants	Masayuki Katō; Koichi Hashimoto; Ryōichi Tanaka

== Video game ==
Now Production developed and Hudson Soft published a game based on the 1991 film for the PC Engine exclusively in Japan. The HuCard version released on December 6, 1991, and the Super CD-ROM² version released on May 29, 1992.

== See also ==
- List of Doraemon films
