= A Grandmother's Recollections =

2000 film by Ayumu Watanabe

- DVD Cover
- Kanji: おばあちゃんの思い出
- Revised Hepburn: Obāchan no Omoide
- Directed by: Ayumu Watanabe
- Screenplay by: Nobuyuki Fujimoto
- Based on: Doraemon by Fujiko F. Fujio
- Starring: Nobuyo Ōyama; Noriko Ohara; Michiko Nomura; Kaneta Kimotsuki; Kazuya Tatekabe
- Music by: Shunsuke Kikuchi
- Production company: Shin-Ei Animation
- Distributed by: Toho
- Release date: March 7, 2000 (Japan)
- Running time: 30 minutes
- Country: Japan
- Language: Japanese

A Grandmother's Recollections (おばあちゃんの思い出, Obāchan no Omoide) is a 2000 Japanese animated science fiction comedy-drama short film. It won the Animation Film Award at the 55th Mainichi Film Awards. It is largely an expanded version of the 1970 chapter "Memories of Grandma".

Parts of Stand by Me Doraemon 2 are largely based on this short film.

== Plot ==
After a disappointing baseball game, Nobita discovers his old teddy bear in the trash his mother Tamako discarded. He confronts her, asking her not to throw it away, before going to his room. Doraemon carries a first aid kit and bandages Nobita's bruised knee. Nobita shares that his teddy bear is a treasured gift from his late grandmother. He then asks Doraemon to take him back to when he was three and she was alive.

They travel to the past and sneak into Nobita's house, where a younger version of his mom is cleaning his bedroom. Nobita, surprised by her youth, tells her she'll become old and wrinkly, prompting him and Doraemon to flee the house to avoid trouble. Outside, they see younger Nobita, who has his lollipop taken by younger Gian and Suneo, who bully him. Angered, Nobita takes it back and hits them, causing them to cry. Doraemon intervenes, calms Nobita, and apologizes to Gian and Suneo, who then stick out their tongues and leave. Nobita and Doraemon watch young Shizuka comfort younger Nobita and walk him home. They then see Nobita's grandmother arriving without fireworks, making young Nobita cry and express that he hates her. Nobita angrily confronts his younger self for yelling at his grandmother, causing him to cry. His mother comes outside, misinterpreting the situation and dismissing Nobita as a weirdo, before taking the younger Nobita inside.

Nobita, recalling memories with his grandmother, sits in a pipe, crying over past regrets. Doraemon, outside, suggests returning to the present, but Nobita continues to express guilt. Doraemon reminds him they visited the past to see her and that his younger self didn't understand her. Doraemon observes younger Nobita and his grandmother walking together, prompting him and Nobita to follow them around town as they search for something. After a day of searching, Nobita and his grandmother sit on a park bench. Nobita wakes up and asks about the fireworks, but his grandmother explains that stores don’t sell them until summer. Upset, Nobita drops his stuffed bear and cries over not having fireworks. Doraemon and Nobita watch from a distance, amplifying Nobita's guilt over his past hurtful behavior toward his grandmother. She approaches their hiding spot, prompting Doraemon to quickly relocate them to avoid being seen. As the younger Nobita cries, Nobita reflects on his selfishness regarding fireworks and feels increasing guilt. A growling black dog steals the stuffed bear, prompting Nobita to chase it while Doraemon gets his head stuck. Nobita climbs a gate and finds the dog among a group of others. Initially considering fleeing, memories of his grandmother inspire him to continue. He narrowly avoids the dogs' attacks, retrieves the bear, and cleverly outsmarts them as they flee. Nobita returns to find Doraemon stuck, but Gian and Suneo appear to seek revenge and reclaim Nobita's bear. They successfully retrieve the bear by pouncing on Nobita and Doraemon.

As Doraemon and Nobita prepare to return to the present, Nobita remembers his grandmother and asks Doraemon to let him visit her. He sneaks into his younger self's house but is spotted by his younger self as he approaches the living room door. Nobita hurriedly enters the living room, where his grandmother sees him. His mother then asks if she's seen a child enter, to which she replies no. After his mother leaves, Nobita thanks his grandmother for her support and, upon confirming she's not scared of him, decides to stay and chat. As they converse, Nobita feels overwhelming guilt about his past actions, causing him to choke up. His grandmother wishes to see him in elementary school, and Nobita decides to grant that wish by revealing he is her future grandson. Doraemon retrieves his backpack, and he returns inside with her. Wearing the backpack, he tells his grandmother he's Nobita. She smiles, saying she suspected it all along. Delighted, Nobita lies on her lap, embraces her, breaks down, and apologizes for being selfish and inconsiderate of her feelings as a little kid. She comforts him, telling him it's okay. Doraemon and Nobita return to the present and find the stuffed bear's taped repairs replaced with pink fabric sewn on. Nobita's mother admits she did it while they were gone. He thanks her sincerely and she replies you're welcome, though asks why he's wearing his backpack. Nobita and Doraemon say nothing and laugh to themselves.

In the credits, Nobita's bruised knee heals, he shows the stuffed bear to his father at a family dinner, keeps it at bedtime, catches a baseball to win the baseball game for the Giants, and takes a new year's school photograph with the stuffed bear by his side.

== Cast ==
Character	Japanese voice actor
Nobita Nobi	Noriko Ohara
Doraemon	Nobuyo Ōyama
Nobita's grandmother	Akiko Takamura
Shizuka Minamoto	Michiko Nomura
Suneo Honekawa	Kaneta Kimotsuki
Takeshi "Gian" Gōda	Kazuya Tatekabe
Tamako Nobi	Sachiko Chijimatsu
Young Nobita Nobi	Makiko Ohmoto
Young Shizuka Minamoto	Rei Sakuma
Young Suneo Honekawa	Tomokazu Seki
Young Takeshi "Gian" Gōda	Kujira
