= Takashi Taguchi (actor) =

Japanese voice actor

Takashi Taguchi (田口 昂, Taguchi Takashi; May 18, 1942 – August 16, 2016 in Tokyo) was a Japanese voice actor.

== Filmography ==
=== Television animation ===
- Aoki Ryusei SPT Layzner
- Ashita no Joe 2 as Harimau
- Cat's Eye as Variety
- City Hunter: Goodbye my Sweetheart as Gen
- Code Geass: Lelouch of the Rebellion as General Cao (ep 20); Rear vassal (ep 6)
- Eternal Family as Drunkard A
- Ganso Tensai Bakabon
- Gatchaman as Variety
- GUNxSWORD as Carlos
- Gyakuten Ippatsu-man
- Hurricane Polymar
- Itadakiman
- Kagaku Ninja-Tai Gatchaman II
- Kashi no Ki Mokku
- Kerokko Demetan
- Lupin III: Part II as Sergio (ep 50, 51); Rasuputan (ep 97)
- Mobile Suit Gundam Wing as Professor H
- Pokémon as Tarō's father (ep 34)
- Sherlock Hound as Varity
- Shinzo Ningen Casshan
- Space Adventure Cobra as Ron Clark
- Time Bokan as Court president (ep 3)
- Uchuu no Kishi Tekkaman as Variety
- Warau Salesman
- Yoroshiku Mechadock

=== Original video animation (OVA) ===
- Bewitching Nozomi as Yamazaki-kaichou (volume 2, 3)
- Mobile Suit Gundam 0083: Stardust Memory as Gaily
- Mobile Suit Gundam Wing: Endless Waltz as Professor H

=== Theatrical animation ===
- Doraemon: Nobita at the Birth of Japan as Landlord
- Doraemon: Nobita's Wannyan Space-Time Odyssey as Fish Government
- Gundam Wing Endless Waltz Special Edition as Instructor H
- Kiki's Delivery Service as Man with deck brush
- Mobile Suit Gundam F91 as Rohbar
- Sword for Truth as Ubito

=== Dubbing ===
- The Fighter, George Ward (Jack McGee)
