= Onegai! Samia-don =

Japanese anime television series

- Please! Psammea-don

おねがい!サミアどん (Onegai! Samia-don)
- Genre: Comedy; Fantasy; Slice of Life
- Anime television series
- Directed by: Osamu Kobayashi
- Produced by: Shunzō Katō; Yutaka Fujioka
- Music by: Kentarō Haneda
- Studio: Tokyo Movie Shinsha
- Original network: NHK
- Original run: April 2, 1985 – February 4, 1986
- Episodes: 39

Please! Psammea-don (おねがい!サミアどん, Onegai! Samia-don) is a Japanese anime that was broadcast on NHK from 2 April 1985 to 4 February 1986 with a total of 39 episodes produced (consists of 78 10-minute segments). This anime is based on the 1902 novel Five Children and It by English author Edith Nesbit.

The anime differs from the novel in revolving around four children rather than five. Three of the children (Sil, Robert and Jane) are siblings while the fourth (Anne) is their friend and neighbor. The four children encounter the Psammead who, in the anime, is depicted as being yellow with a blue hat, and more of a grumpy and lazy being than mischievous.

In Latin America and Spain, the series was known as Samed, el duende mágico ("Psammead, the magic goblin") and in France and Quebec as Sablotin. In the Arab world, it was known as Moghamarat Samid ("Samid's adventures").

A Digitally remastered version was aired on KBS Kyoto and Tochigi TV in 2012, and TOKYO MX in 2015.

== Story ==
England, 1980s. Three children discover a small, clumsy, sandy genie, the last of his kind. He can grant one wish each day. However, after the sunset, the magic wish wears off. The plot revolves around the children making another silly wish each day, which leads to further trouble.

== Characters ==
Samia-don (サミアどん, Samia Don)
Voiced by: Kiyoshi Kawakubo
The protagonist of the series. He is a yellow sand fairy with a large blue triangular hat. He is grumpy and lazy, but has a very good heart. His exact age is unknown, although he has said he is billions of years old. His favorite food is tires, which he will eat even when the vehicles are moving. He hates water and crying children, as if he comes into contact with any liquid, he will die. He lives in the abandoned lime mines, and both the Turner brothers and Ann make wishes with him that last for a day until sunset. Sometimes, they don't have the expected results, getting those who made them into trouble.
Sil Turner (シル・ターナー, Sil Turner)
Voiced by: Hiroshi Takemura
He is the eldest of the Turner siblings. He is a 13-year-old boy who, throughout the series, has a crush on his neighbor Ann. However, he argues with Samia-don and is annoyed that the goblin is noticing her. On one occasion, Samia-don stole a kiss from her, and Sil immediately attacked him. In another episode, he transformed into Ann just to discourage Michael, a popular boy at school who had shown interest in her. In the final episodes, after Samia-don, who used his magic to transform a cat into a human to win Sil's love, Ann becomes jealous and realizes she's in love with him, and they end up dating.
Robert Turner (ロバート・ターナー, Robāto tānā)
Voiced by: Kazuyo Aoki
He is the second-born of the Turner siblings. He is 11 years old, chubby, and loves eating and resting. He is quiet and generally doesn't exercise much. He has a good nature and gets along very well with his sister Jane, who is much smarter than him. His favorite sport is sitting and fishing. Robert is very strong, although he rarely uses his strength.
Jane Turner (ジェーン・ターナー, Jēn tānā)
Voiced by: Eri Saito
She is the third sister and only daughter of the Turner family. She is 9 years old and a capricious, whiny, bad-tempered, but sensitive girl. Most of the wishes she makes are to annoy Helen, a classmate who always points out his wealth. She's the most critical of Samia-don's wishes and usually argues with him or Sil. She almost always bursts into tears (outrageously) when things don't go her way, and Samia-don runs away from her for fear of her tears wetting his whiskers, but overall, she's kind and affectionate. She loves playing and spending time with her siblings. Despite being younger than them, she never lets herself be manipulated.
Baby (チビ, Chibi)
Voiced by: Yumi Miyake
He is the youngest of the Turner siblings. He is a 2-year-old baby, and his appearances are when he needs to be cared for by his siblings, which end in real disasters. He loves playing with Samia-don (even though he is a bit violent with him). The goblin likes the boy, but runs away from him because he usually squeezes him or pulls his whiskers. He always carries a baby bottle, which Samia-don fears because it contains liquid.
Ann Hopkins (アン・ホプキンス, An hopukinsu)
Voiced by: Yōko Asagami
She is a neighbor and friend of the Turner family and the only daughter of Mr. Hopkins. She is a pretty 14-year-old girl with a good character and is affectionate, calling the goblin "Little Samia-don." Samia-don, and especially Sil, are in love with her. In one episode, Sil acquires her figure only to discourage Michael, a boy who was interested in her. She is also attached to Jane, whom she sometimes accompanies, such as when they traveled to London so Jane could participate in a dance competition. Ann is always attentive to her father, and part of her wishes for Samia-don are for him to feel better, such as when Samia-don brought the best baker just so his father could eat good bread. In the final episodes, when Samia-don turned a cat into a human so she would fall in love with Sil, she begins to take an interest in him, and they end up dating.
Harry (ハリー, Harī)
Voiced by: Yoshiko Asai
He is an intellectual 13-year-old boy who lives leaning on the bridge that crosses the river near the Turner family home, reading a book. He is very unfriendly and always boasts about how intelligent he is when talking about his future. He ignores the boys' secret about the magical goblin, and whenever Samia-don uses his magic, Harry realizes something strange is happening. He tries to understand the impossible, formulating his hypotheses, performing calculations, and attempting to give a scientific explanation to the events, but he fails. His mother is proud of him and only gets excited when she thinks he could win some recognition like the Nobel Prize. A recurring gag in the series is when Harry falls into the water from the bridge when he wants to see in detail the events that occur as a result of Samia-don's magic.
Mrs. Turner (ママ, Mama)
Voiced by: Kiyoko Shibata
She is the mother of Sil, Robert, Jane, and the baby. She is 38 years old and a homemaker.

== Staff ==
Series Director: Osamu Kobayashi
Series Composition: Keishi Yamazaki
Script: Chifude Asakura, Eiichi Tachi, Haruya Yamazaki, Hiroko Hagita, Rumiko Asao, Ryo Motohira, Taeko Okina, Toshiyuki Tabe, Yutaka Kaneko
Episode Directors: Fumiko Ishii, Kazuhiko Kobayashi, Kōichirō Nakamura, Makoto Moriwaki, Masaharu Okuwaki, Mitsuru Hongō, Osamu Kobayashi, Shuji Iuchi, Sunao Katabuchi, Tomokazu Kōgo, Tomomi Mochizuki, Yoshio Takeuchi, Yumiko Suda
Art Director: Hiroshi Ōno
Character Design: Tsutomu Shibayama
Animation Director: Hideo Kawauchi
Music: Kentarō Haneda
Music Director: Seiji Suzuki
Music Selection: Yutaka Goda
Director of Photography: Hirokata Takahashi
Editing: Kazuko Takahashi, Masatoshi Tsurubuchi
Recording Director: Masanobu Kasuga
Sound Effects: Miyata Sound
Production Manager: Kazuhiko Yagiuchi
Producer: Shunzō Katō
Executive Producer: Yutaka Fujioka
Developing: Tokyo Laboratory
Production Cooperation: Ajiado
Production: Tokyo Movie Shinsha
Planning and Production: NHK
