= Tsutomu Shibayama =

Japanese animator and filmmaker (1941–2026)

- 芝山 努
- Born: March 9, 1941; Asakusa, Taitō, Tokyo
- Died: March 6, 2026 (aged 84); Tokyo, Japan
- Occupations: Screenwriter; film director; animator; storyboard artist; animation director; animation supervisor; anime director; character designer
- Years active: 1963–2026
- Notable work: Character designer and general animation director of Ganso Tensai Bakabon, Haikara-San: Here Comes Miss Modern, Onegai! Samia-don; Chief director of Ganbare!! Tabuchi-kun!!, The Gutsy Frog, Doraemon, Ranma ½, Chibi Maruko-chan, Nintama Rantarō, Mighty Cat Masked Niyander, Majime ni Fumajime Kaiketsu Zorori (episodes 51–97); Director of Doraemon films (1983–2004)
- Office: Ajiado
- Website: https://ajiado.co.jp/

Tsutomu Shibayama (芝山 努, Shibayama Tsutomu; March 9, 1941 – March 6, 2026) was a Japanese animator, screenwriter, animation supervisor, storyboard artist, character designer, and anime director of television and film. He was also the CEO and president of Ajiado until his death.

He had been active since the 1960s and worked on a wide variety of television anime series and theatrical anime films.

== Biography ==
=== Early life ===
Shibayama was born in Asakusa, Taitō in Tokyo on March 9, 1941.

Born as the second son of a family who had been in the Asakusa business for four generations, wholesaling and selling shamisen parts, his maternal grandmother worked as a hairdresser for kabuki actors, and he was exposed to performing arts, theater, and other downtown culture from a young age.

=== Toei Animation & Shin-Ei Animation ===
In 1963, He joined Toei Animation. His colleague that year was Hayao Miyazaki. That same year, Shibayama made his debut as an animator on the animated film Doggie March. He also studied under Seiichi Hayashi on the TV anime Wolf Boy Ken, and was greatly influenced by Hayashi's artistic style.

In 1966, following Toei Animation's decision to scale back its animation production operations, he moved to A Production (which was reorganized as Shin-Ei Animation in 1976). A Production was established as a company to handle the actual production of animations planned by Tokyo Movie (now TMS Entertainment), and Shibayama began working on Tokyo Movie's projects. There, Shibayama served as an animation director and director of animation on numerous works, including Moomin, Tensai Bakabon, and The Gutsy Frog.

=== Foundation of Ajiado ===
In 1978, he left Shin-Ei Animation and founded Ajiado with Osamu Kobayashi, and others.

In 1979, he made his debut as a director of feature-length animated films with Ganbare!! Tabuchi-kun!!.

When Disney Television Animation and Tokyo Movie began co-producing television animation for about three years starting in 1985, Shibayama also joined the project; although his name did not appear in the credits, he served as the Japanese chief director on The Wuzzles, DuckTales, and The New Adventures of Winnie the Pooh.

=== Later years ===
In 2012, he received the Agency for Cultural Affair Award for his work in animation.

=== Death ===
Shibayama died from lung cancer on March 6, 2026, at the age of 84. It occurred a week after the release of Doraemon: New Nobita and the Castle of the Undersea Devil, a remake of Doraemon: Nobita and the Castle of the Undersea Devil, which was Shibayama's directorial debut in the Doraemon film series.

The ending song of the March 21, 2026 broadcast of Doraemon was changed, including the theme song, with a tribute message for Shibayama shown. The Fujiko F. Fujio Museum also expressed condolences.

== Style ==
Shibayama stood in stark contrast to Hayao Miyazaki, who began his career around the same time; he was an animator who never actively asserted his own views and remained strictly behind the scenes. When his work began to gain recognition among anime fans, he commented, "I feel a sense of guilt for having gone beyond the call of duty."

As a director, Shibayama would create detailed storyboards and layouts during preliminary meetings, then leave the subsequent direction and animation entirely to the animators on the floor without making any revisions. This approach also served to nurture the next generation of animators.

He was also known for his speed. As the layout artist on Lupin the 3rd: The Mystery of Mamo, he single-handedly created over 1,000 shots in about four months; these layouts were so detailed that they could have passed as final key animation. At one point, he even directed four projects simultaneously.

His delicate storyboards, which are easy to see, reduced the effort required for animators to draw. They showcased action with camera angles and varied camera work that made it easy to portray characters, for meticulous time calculations, and to get detailed drawings. His storyboards in particular for Doraemon: Nobita and the Robot Kingdom and Doraemon: Nobita and the Windmasters were even published as books.

Miyazaki and Seiichi Hayashi were amongst those who joined Toei Animation the same time Shibayama had, even being the same age as Miyazaki, as they were both born in 1941.

Keiichi Hara, director of films such Crayon Shin-chan: The Storm Called: The Adult Empire Strikes Back and Colorful, stated that he was greatly influenced by Shibayama's storyboards, demonstrating the influence of Shibayama's meticulous storyboards on many animators and directors.

Despite the high praise, Shibayama was once dissatisfied with praise such as "Shibayama-san of Doraemon" and "Shibayama-san's anime is reassuring to watch", to which he would respond, saying, "I want to depict the darker, more murky inner workings of human nature."

== Legacy ==
Mitsuru Hongo, director of the Crayon Shin-chan anime, commented on Shibayama, "The quality and quantity of his work is simply overwhelming. It's been a while since he retired from the field, but the impact he has left on future generations is immeasurable.".

Yasuo Ōtsuka, animator and character designer on various Japanese anime productions, commented on Moomin, "It was a pleasant surprise to have Tsutomu Shibayama and Osamu Kobayashi help with the animation direction. Shibayama's subtle acting and Kobayashi's slightly goofy and warm acting greatly contributed to the quality of Moomin."

Sōji Yoshikawa, director of Lupin the 3rd: The Mystery of Mamo, praised Shibayama's layout skills for the movie.

Masae Ōtake, key animator on Heathcliff, commented on Shibayama's layouts for Lupin the 3rd: The Mystery of Mamo, "It gave me goosebumps. Is this what a professional is like? I thought, 'If you can't do it like this, you can't become a professional...'"

Manga artist Nao Minda tweeted, "The layout for Lupin III: Lupin vs. the Clone was also done by Tsutomu Shibayama. His skill in making full use of the widescreen Vista aspect ratio is nothing short of amazing. All artists should study from here." and "You can see how amazing Tsutomu Shibayama is just by watching Lupin III: Lupin vs. the Clone. He was in charge of the layout for this movie, and to this day, no anime has surpassed Shibayama's composition in 16:9 aspect ratio."

== Filmography ==
=== Television animation ===
- Wolf Boy Ken (1963-1965)
- Obake no Q-Tarō (1965-1967): Animation
- Hustle Punch (1965-1966): Animation director
- Perman (1967-1968): Animation
- King Kong (1967): Animation director
- Star of the Giants (1968-1971): Animation director
- Moomin (1969-1970): Animation director
- Tensai Bakabon (1971-1972): Animation director
- The Gutsy Frog (1972-1974): Animation director
- First Human Giatrus (1974-1976): Key animation
- Gamba no Bouken (1975): Layout artist
- Doraemon (1979-2005): Chief director, scriptwriter, storyboard artist (1984-2005)
- The Wuzzles (1985): Japanese chief director
- DuckTales (1987): Japanese chief director (Season 1)
- The New Adventures of Winnie the Pooh (1989): Japanese chief director (Season 1)
- Ranma ½ (1989): Director
- Chibi Maruko-chan (1990-1992): Director
- Nintama Rantaro (1993-2012): Director
- Mighty Cat Masked Niyandar (2000-2001): Director
- Monkey Punch Manga Live Action Photography (2005): Storyboard artist
- Seriously Unserious: Kaiketsu Zorori (2006): Director
- The Long Journey of Porphy (2008): Storyboard artist

=== Theatrical animation ===
- Lupin the 3rd: The Mystery of Mamo (1978): Layout artist
- Do Your Best!! Tabuchi-kun!! (1979): Director
- Doraemon film series
  - Doraemon: Nobita's Dinosaur (1980): Layout artist
  - Doraemon: Nobita and the Castle of the Undersea Devil (1983): Director and storyboard artist
  - Doraemon: Nobita's Great Adventure into the Underworld (1984): Director and storyboard artist
  - Doraemon: Nobita's Little Star Wars (1985): Director and storyboard artist
  - Doraemon: Nobita and the Steel Troops (1986): Director and storyboard artist
  - Doraemon: Nobita and the Knights of Dinosaurs (1987): Director and storyboard artist
  - Doraemon: The Record of Nobita's Parallel Visit to the West (1988): Director and storyboard artist
  - Doraemon: Nobita and the Birth of Japan (1989): Director and storyboard artist
  - Doraemon: Nobita and the Animal Planet (1990): Director and storyboard artist
  - Doraemon: Nobita's Dorabian Nights (1991): Director and storyboard artist
  - Doraemon: Nobita and the Kingdom of Clouds (1992): Director and storyboard artist
  - Doraemon: Nobita and the Tin Labyrinth (1993): Director and storyboard artist
  - Doraemon: Nobita's Three Visionary Swordsmen (1994): Director and storyboard artist
  - Doraemon: Nobita's Diary on the Creation of the World (1995): Director and storyboard artist
  - Doraemon: Nobita and the Galaxy Super-express (1996): Director and storyboard artist
  - Doraemon: Nobita and the Spiral City (1997): Director and storyboard artist
  - Doraemon: Nobita's Great Adventure in the South Seas (1998): Director and storyboard artist
  - Doraemon: Nobita Drifts in the Universe (1999): Director, storyboard artist, and ending animation director
  - Doraemon: Nobita and the Legend of the Sun King (2000): Director, storyboard artist, and ending animation director
  - Doraemon: Nobita and the Winged Braves (2001): Director and storyboard artist
  - Doraemon: Nobita and the Robot Kingdom (2002): Director and storyboard artist
  - Doraemon: Nobita and the Windmasters (2003): Director and storyboard artist
  - Doraemon: Nobita in the Wan-Nyan Spacetime Odyssey (2004): Director and storyboard artist
- Good Luck!! Tabuchi-kun!! 2nd Fierce Fight Pennant Race (1980): Manager
- Makoto-chan (1980): Director
- Good Luck!! Tabuchi-kun!! First Laughter 3rd: Oh, Stubborn Life (1980): Director
- The Monster Kid: Invitation to Monster Land (1981): Setting and layout artist
- 21 Emon: Welcome to Space! (1981): Director
- The Monster Kid: The Demon Sword (1982): Setting and layout artist
- The Gutsy Frog: The Movie (1982): Director
- Tsushima Maru: Goodbye, Okinawa (1982): Animation director
- How to Enjoy Professional Baseball 10 Times More (1983): Animation director
- The Adventurers: Gamba and His Seven Companions (1984): Display settings
- Kakkun Cafe (1984): Animation director
- Touch 3: Kimi ga Toorisugita Ato ni – Don't Pass Me By (1987): Storyboard
- Prefectural Sea Sea High School Baseball Club Yamashita Taro-kun (1988): Supervisor
- The Middle-Aged Man Remodeling Course (1990): Supervisor
- Chibi Maruko-chan (1990): Supervisor
- Chibi Maruko-chan: My Favorite Song (1992): Supervisor and storyboard
- How to Make Watching the J.League 100 Times More Fun!! (1994): Animation director
- Nintama Rantarō the Movie (1996): General director
- Serious Yet Playful: Zorroli's Great Treasure Hunt (2006): Production committee
- Love and Berry: Dress Up and Dance! – Magic of Happiness (2007): Image board
- You Are Umasou (2010): Production committee
- Nintama Rantarō the Movie: Ninjutsu Academy All-Out Mission! (2011): Supervisor
- Magic Tree House (2012): Production committee
- The Movie: Zorroli: The Great Adventure! (2012): Supervisor
- Little Jam and Opp the Goblin (2024): Supervisor

=== Other ===
- Lupin the Third: Pilot Film (1969): Character designer and animator

=== Bibliography ===
Date	Title	Role	Publisher	ISBN
1994	Doraemon: The Long-Form Series "The Records of Nobita, Spaceblazer" Side Story: The Tale of Koya Koya 大長編ドラえもん「のび太の宇宙開拓史」外伝 コーヤコーヤ星物語	Illustrator	Shogakukan	
1994	Doraemon: Nobita's Great Adventure in the Underworld (Extended Edition) – Side Story: Miyako's Magical Wars 大長編ドラえもん「のび太の魔界大冒険」外伝 美夜子の魔法戦記 (マジカルウォーズ)	Illustrator	Shogakukan	
2002	Tsutomu Shibayama and movie Doraemon world of "Nobita and the Robot Kingdom" 芝山努と映画ドラえもん『のび太とロボット王国(キングダム)』の世界	Illustrator	Shogakukan	ISBN 978-4091015594
2003	"Doraemon: Nobita and the Windmasters" Storyboard Collection 映画ドラえもん『のび太とふしぎ風使い』絵コンテ集	Illustrator	Shogakukan	ISBN 978-4092902749
