= Kabu no Isaki =

Japanese manga series

- First tankōbon volume cover, featuring (from left to right) Kajika, Isaki, and Shiro (standing)

カブのイサキ
- Genre: Science fiction
- Manga
- Written by: Hitoshi Ashinano
- Published by: Kodansha
- Imprint: Afternoon KC
- Magazine: Monthly Afternoon
- Original run: June 25, 2007 – November 24, 2012
- Volumes: 6
- icon

Kabu no Isaki (Japanese: カブのイサキ; lit. 'Isaki of the Cub') is a Japanese manga series written and illustrated by Hitoshi Ashinano. It was serialized in Kodansha's seinen manga magazine Monthly Afternoon from June 2007 to November 2012.

Kabu no Isaki shares many characteristic hallmarks of Ashinano's style: fascination with aeronautical themes; a setting in the future; a setting on and around the Miura peninsula; a vision of Japan that is isolated and nostalgic; and a natural world full of mystery that the protagonists explore with a sense of wonder. As such, there are many parallels with Ashinano's previous work Yokohama Kaidashi Kikou.

== Plot ==
Isaki (イサキ) is a young aircraft pilot who flies a Piper Super Cub. The Cub is owned by his neighbour Shiro (シロ), and Isaki often flies errands for her as a way to pay for his use of the plane. Shiro's younger sister Kajika (カジカ) is also capable of flying the plane and occasionally accompanies Isaki on his journeys.

The story is notable for distortions in the scale of the world, which is ten times bigger than normal. This number is both explicitly mentioned, and is also depicted by geographical features that exist in reality being ten times larger in the story. Certain other features of the world are also gigantic, such as the Tokyo Tower which is described as 3333 meters tall (ten times larger than in real life). The plants are also gigantic, up to roughly 100 times larger than normal, although most are normal-sized. As is typical with Ashinano's stories, no explanations are given for the distortions, so the reader is left to wonder along with the characters.

== Publication ==
Written and illustrated by Hitoshi Ashinano, Kabu no Isaki was first published as a one-shot in Kodansha's seinen manga magazine Monthly Afternoon on June 25, 2007. The series was picked up on September 25 that same year, and was a bimonthly feature in the magazine until October 2009. The series later resumed on February 25, 2010, where it was published every month, before concluding on November 24, 2012. Kodansha collected its chapters in six tankōbon volumes, released from October 23, 2008, to January 23, 2013.

=== Volumes ===
No.	Japanese release date	Japanese ISBN
1	October 23, 2008	978-4-06-314534-2
2	October 23, 2009	978-4-06-314586-1
3	September 22, 2010	978-4-06-310694-7
4	April 22, 2011	978-4-06-310747-0
5	March 23, 2012	978-4-06-387802-8
6	January 23, 2013	978-4-06-387863-9
