= Art direction of Royal Space Force: The Wings of Honnêamise =

Art direction of the 1987 anime film

Animation studio Gainax's 1987 debut work Royal Space Force: The Wings of Honnêamise was the first project on which Hiromasa Ogura served as art director; although later noted for creating much of the aesthetic behind the influential 1995 film Ghost in the Shell, Ogura himself in a 2012 interview regarded Royal Space Force as the top work of his career. Working from Yoshiyuki Sadamoto's color scheme and Takashi Watabe's architectural drawings, Ogura then gave a "a sense of life" to the aesthetics of the world setting of Royal Space Force through background paintings created by himself and a staff of 16, including future Studio Ghibli art director Yōji Takeshige, whose first work in the anime industry was on the film. The film's writer and director, Hiroyuki Yamaga, sought to avoid using what he regarded as the usual visual symbolism of anime, and instead wanted Royal Space Force's art direction to express specific times of day and night; Ogura attempted to convey Yamaga's verbal instructions in graphic form.

Nobuyuki Ohnishi, a contemporary illustrator whose work director Hiroyuki Yamaga knew from the music magazines Swing Journal and ADLIB, was chosen by him to create the film's title sequence and closing credits. Yamaga viewed Ohnishi's style, which employed classical sumi-e ink wash painting technique to depict modern subjects, as a method to convey an alternate perspective and suggest the film's exercise in worldbuilding also included a conceptual past and future, rather than a world brought into existence for the sake of one particular narrative in time. Yamaga believed using contributions only from artists inside the anime industry set limits on the creative potential of an anime project, and compared Ohnishi's involvement to Ryuichi Sakamoto serving as the film's music director or Leo Morimoto as its lead voice actor.

The climactic visionary montage of the protagonist Shirotsugh's childhood and the history of the film's world was referred to in production as its "image scene"; Yamaga, who had written the scene in the script simply as a flashback, worked closely with future The Animatrix and Gankutsuou director Mahiro Maeda to develop the image scene through meetings and discussion, reworking the impressions developed and adding material until a storyboard was completed, based on which Maeda created the finished sequence. Royal Space Force planner Toshio Okada stated in his memoirs that he regarded it as the only place in the film appropriate to the true artistic potential of Maeda; Okada argued that not even Hayao Miyazaki had employed Maeda's talent properly when he had worked on the previous year's Castle in the Sky.

== Art direction ==
=== Hiromasa Ogura joins project ===
Hiromasa Ogura had entered the anime industry in 1977 as a background painter at Kobayashi Production, where he contributed art to such films as Lupin III: The Castle of Cagliostro and Harmagedon. At the time work began on Royal Space Force, Ogura was at Studio Fuga, a backgrounds company he had co-founded in 1983; he related that it was his associate Yoshimi Asari of Triangle Staff who contacted him on behalf of Gainax, arranging for Okada and Inoue to come to Fuga and discuss their plans for the film. Ogura mentioned that although he did not know the details of how Asari came to suggest him for the job, he found out later that Gainax had previously approached his seniors Shichirō Kobayashi and Mukuo Takamura, who had been the art directors on Lupin III: The Castle of Cagliostro and Harmagedon respectively, but that both had passed on Royal Space Force.

After joining the Royal Space Force team on temporary loan from Studio Fuga, Ogura worked in the film's pre-production studio in Takadanobaba. He later joked that his initial reaction to Gainax was "What's up with these people?", remarking that they acted like a bunch of students who all knew each other, whereas he had no idea who any of them were. Although Ogura recalled that he had seen the Daicon opening animation films before starting Fuga and had been impressed that amateurs had made them, he did not realize at first that he was now working with the same people, laughing that he likewise eventually recognized Anno from having seen his role in The Return of Ultraman. After the completion of Royal Space Force, Ogura went to work on his first project with Mamoru Oshii, Twilight Q: Mystery Case File 538, but would later collaborate with Gainax again as art director of the final episodes of the 1990-91 TV series Nadia: The Secret of Blue Water and of the 2000-01 OVA series FLCL, which Ogura personally ranked alongside his work on the Patlabor films and Jin-Roh: The Wolf Brigade, praising the unique world sense of FLCL series director Kazuya Tsurumaki and animator, designer, and layout artist Hiroyuki Imaishi.

Ogura oversaw a team of 16 background painters on Royal Space Force, including the future art director of Princess Mononoke, Spirited Away, and The Wind Rises, Yōji Takeshige. At the time of Royal Space Force's production, Takeshige was still a student attending Tama Art University; the following year he would join Studio Ghibli to create backgrounds for 1988's My Neighbor Totoro. Ogura remarked that many of his team were veterans of Sanrio's theatrical films unit, which gave him confidence in their abilities. More than half of the background paintings for the film were made on site at Gainax, rather than assigning the task to staff working externally, as Ogura felt the worldview and details of the film's aesthetic were easier for him to communicate to artists in person, giving as an example the color subtleties; as the color scheme in Royal Space Force was subdued, if a painting needed more of a bluish cast to it, he couldn't simply instruct the artist to "add more blue."

=== Creation of film world's aesthetic ===
Toshio Okada described the appearance of the world in which Royal Space Force takes place as having been shaped in stages by three main artists: first, its major color elements (blue and brown) were determined by Sadamoto; then its architectural styles and artistic outlook were designed by [Takashi] Watabe, and finally Ogura gave it "a sense of life" through depicting its light, shadow, and air. It was noted also that the film's world displays different layers of time in its designs; the main motifs being Art Deco, but with older Art Nouveau and newer postmodern elements also present. Yamaga expressed the view that Ogura being a Tokyo native allowed him to do a good job on the film's city scenes, yet Ogura himself described the task as difficult; while he attempted to sketch out as much of the city as possible, its urban aesthetic was so cluttered that it was difficult for him to determine vanishing point and perspective. Ogura commented that although the film depicted a different world, "there's nothing that you'd call sci-fi stuff, it's everyday, normal life like our own surroundings. I wanted to express that messy impression." As art director, he also laid particular emphasis on attempting to convey the visual texture of the world's architecture and interior design, remarking that he was amazed at how Watabe's original drawings of buildings contained detailed notes on the structural and decorative materials used in them, inspiring Ogura to then express in his paintings such aspects as the woodwork motifs prominent in the Royal Space Force headquarters, or by contrast the metallic elements in the room where the Republic minister Nereddon tastes wine. Watabe and Ogura would collaborate again in 1995 on constructing the cityscapes of Ghost in the Shell.

Ogura theorized that the background paintings in Royal Space Force were a result not only of the effort put into the film, but the philosophy behind the effort: "I think this shows what you can make if you take animation seriously. [Yamaga] often said he wanted to dispense with the usual symbolic bits. It isn't about saying that because it's evening, the colors should be signified in this way. Not every sunset is the same." Critiquing his own work, Ogura wished that he had been able to convey more emphasis on the effects of light and shadow in addition to color, citing as an example the early scene at the graveyard, where he felt he should have depicted greater contrast in the objects lit by sunlight, but joked that it was hard to say exactly how things would turn out until he actually painted them, something he said was true of the entire film. As Yamaga conveyed images to him only through words, Ogura was glad that he was allowed to be free to try to express them visually in his own way, particularly because even in evening shots, the director would specify to him whether it should depict evening close to dawn, the dead of night, or evening close to sunset, noting wryly that it was hard to express the difference between 3 a.m and 4 a.m. Looking back on the project from 2012, Ogura maintained that while he rarely rewatched his old work, he still felt the passion when he viewed a DVD of the film: "I thought there aren't a lot of people these days making [anime] with such a level of passion. Royal Space Force was very exciting, and so were the people around me."

=== Image scene ===
The visionary sequence in the film occurring after Shirotsugh's spacecraft in orbit crosses from the world's nightside to its dayside, depicting memories of his youth followed by the cycles of human history, was referred to in production as its "image scene." Ogura discussed the involvement in this scene of former Sanrio artist Hiroshi Sasaki, who would later himself serve as art director on 2004's Gankutsuou, whereas in the director's commentary Akai emphasized the role of Mahiro Maeda, who would partner again with Sasaki as Gankutsuou's director. Maeda recalled that initially there was no storyboard to guide the creation of the sequence, which was only written in the script as a scene involving a flashback. He proceeded to develop it by taking meetings with Yamaga, buying photo albums of news events for ideas, and trying to make drawings from inspiration each day. "Yamaga expressed a desire to convey something like human history. I thought it would be best to start with the image of one individual, such as Shirotsugh's own personal history. So we wondered about it, and together came up with impressions of what his childhood had been like. The director then selected and reworked these impressions, adding in some other elements that were thought to be missing, and then finally we had a storyboard ... So, for that scene, I did the storyboards, the model sheets, and the original drawings," laughing, "If that wasn't a good scene, I can't blame anyone but myself." In his 2010 memoir, Okada judged that the sequence was the only place in the film appropriate to the talent of Maeda, whom he called a "true artist." Anime, Okada argued, was like a reactor that harnessed Maeda, whose artistic talent Okada compared to that of a nuclear blast, for the mundane purpose of boiling water, commenting to him that to him Gankutsuou felt like watching only a Kaiyodo scale model of what Maeda was truly capable of creatively. Okada asserted that not even Hayao Miyazaki had been able to use Maeda properly on Castle in the Sky, where he had been the key animator in charge of the scene where the center of Laputa collapses: "Maeda's talent shouldn't be used that way."

=== Credits sequences ===
In the 2000 director's commentary, Akai recalled his initial surprise that Yamaga wanted to use Nobuyuki Ohnishi's illustrations for the film's credits sequences, and that also "some of the animators felt there were better illustrators," a remark that made Yamaga laugh and comment, "The world of animators is a small one." At the time of Royal Space Force's production, Ohnishi was known for his spot illustrations in the reader's corner section of Pia, a weekly Tokyo culture and entertainment magazine associated with the long-running Pia Film Festival, as well as his airplane illustrations drawn for the magazine Model Graphix, where an occasional fellow contributing artist was Hayao Miyazaki. In a 1995 conversation with Animerica, Ohnishi remarked however that Yamaga's personal familiarity with his work came through Ohnishi's illustrations for the Japanese magazines Swing Journal, a jazz publication modeled on DownBeat, and ADLIB, covering fusion and pop. Ohnishi, a graduate of the prestigious Musashino Art University, had been an assistant on the films of avant-garde dramatist Shūji Terayama and recalled having been "a little surprised" when Yamaga first approached him, as Ohnishi had "considered animation at the time to be strictly for children, and his own work had always been directed towards adults," but that Yamaga assured him that the film "was going to be a very adult take on science fiction."

Yamaga had desired that the opening and ending credits show the world portrayed in the film from a different perspective, and felt that Ohnishi's method of using light and shadow was ideal for the purpose. He asked the artist to create an "image of inheritance," to convey a sense that this world did not exist only for the events told of in the film, but that it had existed also in its past, and would exist into its future as well. Although his illustration style used a sumi-e ink wash painting technique from classical East Asian art, Ohnishi commented that he was uninterested in traditional subjects such as "bamboo and old Chinese mountains," preferring instead to paint "the typewriter and the skyscraper," with a particular interest in 1950s-era objects. Ohnishi's approach in the credits made frequent use of photographs of real people and historical events, which he would then modify when adapting it into a painting: "exchanging and replacing the details of, for example, a European picture with Asian or Middle-Eastern elements and motifs. In this way, the credits would reflect both the cultural mixing that gives the film as a whole its appearance, and symbolize the blurring between our world and the film's world, thus serving [Royal Space Force's] function as a 'kaleidoscopic mirror.'" The last painting in the opening credits, where Yamaga's name as director appears, is based on a photograph of Yamaga and his younger sister when they were children. Shiro's return alive from space is depicted in the first paintings of the ending credits; Yamaga remarked that they represent the photos appearing in textbooks from the future of the world of Royal Space Force.
