= Ajiado =

Japanese animation studio

Ajiado Co., Ltd.
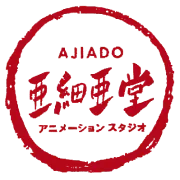
- Logo used as of 2014
- Native name: 株式会社亜細亜堂
- Romanized name: Kabushiki-gaisha Ajiadō
- Type: Kabushiki gaisha
- Industry: Japanese animation
- Founded: October 4, 1978; 48 years ago
- Founder: Tsutomu Shibayama, Osamu Kobayashi, Michishiro Yamada
- Headquarters: Oto, Chūō-ku, Saitama, Saitama Prefecture, Japan
- Key people: Shinichiro Ozawa (President)
- Number of employees: 81
- Subsidiaries: Dap International, Inc. Japan Taps
- Website: ajiado.co.jp

Ajiado Co., Ltd. (Japanese: 株式会社亜細亜堂, Hepburn: Kabushiki-gaisha Ajiadō) is a Japanese animation studio established on October 4, 1978. It is noted for animated series including Spirit of Wonder, Absolute Boy, Izetta: The Last Witch, and several others, including the long-running NHK series Nintama Rantarō. Its name can be translated as "Hall of Asia."

== History ==
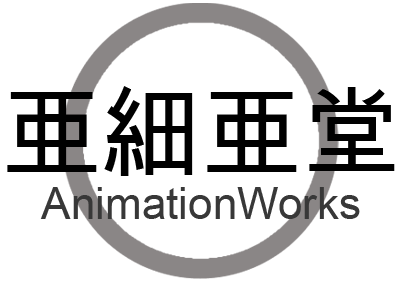
Logo used until 2014.

The studio was founded in 1978 by the noted animators Tsutomu Shibayama, Osamu Kobayashi and Michishiro Yamada, former members of the animation studio A Production, under the corporate title Yugen-kaisha Ajiadō (有限会社亜細亜堂). The name Ajiadō is a penname used by Tsutomu Shibayama and Osamu Kobayashi.

In 1985, it formally became a kabushiki gaisha (business corporation). In 1987, it produced its first series, the OVA Twilight Q (トワイライトQ, Towairaito Q). It established the company Dap International Kabushiki-gaisha (ダップインターナショナル株式会社, Dappu Intānashonaru Kabushiki-gaisha) in 1990.

At the same time, they established a joint venture company, Japan Taps (ジャパンタップス, Japan Tappusu), with the toy company Takara. They undertook the production of anime such as Miracle Girls and also engaged in subcontracting for other anime productions sponsored by the company (later dissolved). In 1998, the studio established a digital animation division to produce its digital animation.

In 2005, the studio produced Zettai Shōnen, which was directed by Tomomi Mochizuki and premiered on NHK BS2. In 2007, it produced Emma – A Victorian Romance: Second Act, the second season of Emma – A Victorian Romance.

== Works ==
=== Television series ===
- Miracle Girls (1993)
- Nintama Rantarō (1993–present)
- Wankorobe (1996–1997)
- Kaiketsu Zorori (2004–2005)
- Majime ni Fumajime Kaiketsu Zorori (2005–2007)
- Absolute Boy (2005)
- Kujibiki Unbalance (2006)
- Emma – A Victorian Romance: Second Act (2007)
- DD Fist of the North Star (2013–2015)
- Hokuto no Ken: Ichigo Aji (2015)
- Izetta: The Last Witch (2016)
- How Not to Summon a Demon Lord (2018)
- Ascendance of a Bookworm (2019–2022)
- Kakushigoto (2020)
- Motto! Majime ni Fumajime Kaiketsu Zorori (2020–2022)
- Kemono Jihen (2021)
- Revenger (2023)
- A Sign of Affection (2024)
- From Bureaucrat to Villainess: Dad's Been Reincarnated! (2025)
- Yano-kun's Ordinary Days (2025)

=== Films ===
- Kakkun Cafe (September 22, 1984)
- Maison Ikkoku: Kanketsuhen (February 6, 1988) – Television film
- J League o 100-bai Tanoshiku Miru Hōhō!! (June 11, 1994)
- Eiga Nintama Rantarō (June 29, 1996)
- Donguri no Ie (1997)
- Majime ni Fumajime Kaiketsu Zorori: Nazo no Otakara Daisakusen (March 11, 2006)
- You Are Umasou (October 16, 2010)
- Gekijō-ban Anime Nintama Rantarō Ninjutsu Gakuen Zenin Shutsudō! no Dan (March 12, 2011)
- Magic Tree House (October 23, 2011)
- Kaiketsu Zorori Da-Da-Da-Daibouken! (December 22, 2012)
- Kaiketsu Zorori: Mamoru ze! Kyouryuu no Tamago (December 14, 2013)
- Kaiketsu Zorori: Uchū no Yūsha-tachi (September 12, 2015)
- Eiga Kaiketsu Zorori ZZ no Himitsu (November 22, 2017)
- Seven Days War (2019)
- Kakushigoto (July 9, 2021) – Compilation film
- Gekijōban Nintama Rantaro Dokutake Ninjatai Saikyō no Gunshi (December 2024)

=== OVAs/ONAs ===
- Time Knot: Reflection (1987)
- Shiratori Reiko de Gozaimasu! (1990)
- Spirit of Wonder: Chaina-san no Yūutsu (1992)
- Yokohama Kaidashi Kikou (1998)
- Azumanga Web Daioh (2000)
- Spirit of Wonder (2001–2004)
- Yokohama Kaidashi Kikou: Quiet Country Cafe (2002–2003)
- Kujibiki Unbalance (2004–2005; production by Palm Studio)
- Genshiken (2006–2007)
- Ascendance of a Bookworm (2020)

== Noted staff ==
=== Directors ===
- Tsutomu Shibayama
- Osamu Kobayashi
- Hideo Kawauchi
- Yumiko Suda
- Tomomi Mochizuki
- Tsuneo Kobayashi
- Hiroki Negishi
- Reiko Suzuki
- Tomoko Iwasaki

=== Screenwriters ===
- Michishiro Yamada
- Yoshiyaki Yanagida
- Masaya Fujimori
- Hideyuki Funakoshi
- Kinichirō Suzuki
- Yūko Ikuno
- Masayuki Sekine
- Hiroshi Kawaguchi
- Mitsuyuki Musaki
- Yayoi Yoshikawa
- Yūichi Nakajima
- Yuki Nishioka
- Noriko Ogino
- Tsuyoshi Ichiki
- Yasuhiro Endō
