= Mamiko Ikeda =

Japanese anime scriptwriter

Mamiko Ikeda (池田 眞美子, Ikeda Mamiko) is a Japanese scriptwriter for anime. She has worked on such series as Emma – A Victorian Romance, Maid Sama! and numerous others.

== Screenwriting ==
- series head writer denoted in bold

=== Anime television series ===
- Pokonyan! (1993)
- Tico of the Seven Seas (1994)
- Heisei Inu Monogatari Bau (1994)
- **Tonde Burin** (1994-1995)
- Mama Loves the Poyopoyo-Saurus (1995)
- Grander Musashi (1997)
- Harimogu Harry (1997)
- Grander Musashi RV (1998)
- Ojarumaru (1999)
- **I'm Gonna Be An Angel!** (1999)
- Chibi Maruko-chan (1999)
- Carried by the Wind: Tsukikage Ran (2000)
- Gravitation (2000)
- UFO Baby (2000)
- Fruits Basket (2001)
- Kasumin (2001-2003)
- Atashin'chi (2002)
- Seven of Seven (2002)
- Princess Tutu (2002)
- Ultra Maniac (2003)
- **Da Capo** (2003)
- **Di Gi Charat Nyo!** (2003)
- Nanaka 6/17 (2003)
- Kaiketsu Zorori (2004)
- Genshiken (2004)
- Midori Days (2004)
- Legendz: Yomigaeru Ryuo Densetsu (2004)
- **Sgt. Frog** (2004-2008): head writer (eps 1–103)
- **Emma - A Victorian Romance** (2005)
- Sugar Sugar Rune (2005)
- **Sukisho** (2005)
- **Kagihime Monogatari Eikyū Alice Rondo** (2006)
- **Himawari!** (2006)
- **We Were There** (2006)
- **Emma - A Victorian Romance: Second Act** (2007)
- **Kenkō Zenrakei Suieibu Umishō** (2007)
- **Nagasarete Airantō** (2007)
- **Himawari Too!** (2007)
- **Les Misérables: Shōjo Cosette** (2007)
- **Rental Magica** (2007)
- **Kyōran Kazoku Nikki** (2008)
- Shugo Chara!! Doki (2008)
- Yattermen! (2008)
- Kimi ni Todoke (2009)
- **Chrome Shelled Regios** (2009)
- Kobato (2009)
- Tamagotchi! (2009)
- Hanasakeru Seishōnen (2009)
- Mainichi Kaasan (2009)
- **Maid Sama!** (2010)
- Jewelpet Twinkle (2010)
- Croisée in a Foreign Labyrinth (2011)
- Tamayura: Hitotose (2011)
- **Brave 10** (2012)

=== OVAs ===
- Di Gi Charat Theater - Leave it to Piyoko-pyo! (2003)
- Grrl Power (2004)

=== Anime films ===
- Heisei Inu Monogatari Bau: Genshi Inu Monogatari Bau (1994)
- Doki Doki Wildcat Engine (2000)
- Goal! Goal! Goal!! (2001)
- Di Gi Charat: A Trip to the Planet (2001)
- Keroro Gunsō the Super Movie (2006)
