= The Orphans of Simitra =

1955 book by Paul-Jacques Bonzon

- First edition
- Author: Paul-Jacques Bonzon
- Original title: Les Orphelins de Simitra
- Illustrator: Albert Chazelle
- Language: French
- Genre: Children's novel
- Publisher: Hachette
- Publication date: 1955
- Publication place: France
- Media type: Print (hardcover)
- Pages: 191

The Orphans of Simitra (French: Les Orphelins de Simitra) is a 1955 French children's novel by Paul-Jacques Bonzon.

== Plot ==
Porphyras Patagos is a twelve-year-old boy who lives with his parents, his older brother Constantine, and his younger sister Mina (short for Marina) in the Greek village of Simitra. His father runs a small roadside garage and hopes to expand it into a service station. Fascinated by automobiles, Porphyras dreams of wearing a red uniform and serving motorists at the family's future petrol station. When the boy's dream is about to come true, the family's life is shattered when a powerful earthquake destroys Simitra. Porphyras loses his parents and brother, while Mina is seriously injured. The two children are placed in an orphanage and face the possibility of being separated before being entrusted to the same foster family.

They are subsequently adopted by the Van Hoolen family in the Netherlands, who already have two children of their own, Piete and Johanna. Although treated kindly, both struggle to adapt to an unfamiliar country, language, and way of life. While Porphyras gradually settles into his new surroundings and enjoys working after school in a garage, Mina struggles to adapt. A letter from their Greek friend Zaïmis rekindles her longing for her homeland, and she grows resentful of what she perceives as Porphyras's acceptance of their new life. Unable to overcome her homesickness, she eventually disappears, and despite extensive searches no trace of her can be found.

Convinced that his sister has gone to France in search of Anne-Marie, a French tourist she had befriended, Porphyras leaves the Netherlands and secretly boards a truck bound for Paris. When the driver, Monsieur Bruneau, discovers him, he initially reacts angrily but eventually takes pity on the boy and welcomes him into his family's modest home. Determined not to become a burden on the already impoverished Bruneau household, Porphyras finds employment at the Acropolis Restaurant, a Greek establishment run by expatriates. Although the owner, Xaropoulus, first appears kind and supportive, he soon reveals himself to be exploitative and miserly, forcing the boy to work long hours. After being physically assaulted by his employer, Porphyras resigns and returns to the Bruneau family.

Still searching for Mina, decides to travel to Marseille, where Anne-Marie lives. During the journey, he hides aboard another truck but is caught in a serious road accident on Highway No. 7. Injured but alive, he is rescued by Toine and Miette Barbidoux, the owners of a roadside service station known as The Emperor's Filling Station. The station received its name after an Ethiopian emperor had once stopped there following a punctured tire. Porphyras settles with the Barbidoux family and begins working at the station, where he finally fulfills his childhood dream of wearing a service-station uniform—although it is blue rather than the red one he had imagined. Thanks to his diligence and ability to speak several languages, he quickly becomes popular with travelers and helps attract new customers. The warm climate, olive groves, and Mediterranean landscape remind him of Greece and give him renewed hope.

Eventually, news arrives from the Netherlands: a letter from the Norwegian consulate has revealed Mina's whereabouts. After disappearing, she had drifted away during a storm at sea and was rescued by a ship. During the rescue she suffered a head injury that caused memory loss, and she spent several months in Bergen, Norway, unable to remember her identity. Only recently had her memory returned with the help of the wife of the Norwegian consul in Athens.

Mina is brought to southern France, where she is finally reunited with her brother after eight months, and she tells him of her experiences in Norway. Delighted by the familiar climate and cuisine, which remind her of their homeland, Mina decides to remain with him. Porphyras will continue to work at the filling station, while Mina will attend school and help Miette with household duties. The story ends with the siblings beginning a new life together in southern France. As Mina watches her brother confidently serving customers at the station, she reflects on how he has endured every hardship without losing faith in life. Both remain hopeful that one day they will again meet the many people who helped them during their journeys.

== Publication history ==
The novel was first published by Hachette in 1955 as part of the Idéal-Bibliothèque collection, with illustrations by Albert Chazelle. The work originally carried the subtitle Le Relais de l’Empereur ("The Emperor's Relay"), a title proposed by Bonzon but ultimately rejected by the publisher. By January 1956, Hachette had recorded sales of 18,070 copies during the 1955 fiscal year.

On 20 December 1962, the novel was republished by Hachette in the Nouvelle Bibliothèque Rose collection. This edition introduced several revisions and removed a number of descriptions and psychological observations considered excessively verbose.

An English translation by Thelma Niklaus was published in 1957 by the University of London Press, retaining Chazelle's original illustrations. A United States edition followed in 1962, published by Criterion Books in New York and illustrated by Simon Jeruchim.

== Awards ==
For this novel, Bonzon received the Prix Enfance du Monde in 1955 and the Children's Spring Book Festival Award of the New York Herald Tribune in 1962.

== Adaptations ==
The novel was adapted by Nippon Animation into the 52-episode Japanese animated television series Porphy no Nagai Tabi (Porphy's Long Journey). The series aired on BS Fuji from 6 January to 28 December 2008 as part of the World Masterpiece Theater programme, which adapted classics of children's literature into animated television series. It was never broadcast in France. While the main characters of Porphyras and his sister Mina retain the essential characteristics of the novel, most of the supporting characters and much of the plot development are original to the animated adaptation.
