= Absolute Boy =

Japanese anime television series

- Promotional image for Zettai Shōnen

絶対少年 (Zettai Shōnen)
- Anime television series
- Directed by: Tomomi Mochizuki
- Written by: Kazunori Itō
- Music by: Masumi Itō
- Studio: Ajiado
- Original network: NHK
- English network: SEA: Animax Asia
- Original run: May 21, 2005 – November 19, 2005
- Episodes: 26
- Light novel
- Written by: Tatsuya Hamazaki
- Illustrated by: Sunaho Tobe
- Published by: MediaWorks
- Imprint: Dengeki Bunko
- Original run: August 10, 2005 – December 10, 2005
- Volumes: 2

Absolute Boy (絶対少年, Zettai Shōnen) is a Japanese anime television series. Produced by Ajiado and Bandai Visual, and directed by Tomomi Mochizuki and written by Kazunori Itō, it aired for 26 episodes on NHK between May and November 2005. The series featured character designs by Sunaho Tobe, who also illustrated the series' light novel adaptation, which was serialized in Dengeki Bunko between August and December 2005.

== Plot ==
=== Summer Arc ===
The first twelve episodes of the series focus on the daily life of Ayumu Aizawa as he visits his father, a veterinarian, in a small town in the countryside. Ayumu has spent his visit thus far aimlessly biking across the valley, but a chance meeting with a girl named Miku sends him searching for a long-lost friend of his, Wakkun. Upon finding Wakkun, he discovers that the boy has not aged since he and Ayumu played as children. Wakkun is also wearing clothes very similar to the raincoat and galoshes that Ayumu wore habitually as a child. Wakkun introduces Ayumu to his two friends, Dosshiru (Doss) and Shisshin (Sense), mysterious flying objects that alternate between a mechanical form and a sphere of yellow light.

A local reporter, Akira Sukawara is attracted by reports of kappa and other mysterious events. She follows the animals, notably a cat one of the local boys saw fighting a kappa, to the yellow lights, and grills a reluctant Ayumu for information. Unable to remember the summer he spent in Tana as a child, Ayumu, with the help of Miku and several other people from Tana, tries to understand what happened when he was a child, and the mysterious connection between him, Wakkun, Dosshiru, and Shisshin.

=== Winter Arc ===
A few years later, Kisa Tanigawa, a depressed high school student, skips routine class. Wandering around the city in the evening, she stumbles upon another mysterious mechanical object. Naming it "Bun-chan", after the sound it makes, she takes it home and treats it as a pet. When Kisa tries building a fish out of old scraps of metal, the top fin of the fish does not stay, so Bun-chan (Ping) helps glue it on. Meanwhile, Sukawara reappears, now trying to prove the existence of the mysterious objects that appeared at the Cat Dance in Tana one-and-a-half years ago, which she terms "material fairies", and hears about Bun-chan. Upon witnessing a meeting between Kisa and Ayumu, she calls Bun-chan not a material fairy, but a "material evil", as its outward appearance does not resemble those of the material fairies spotted in Tana. However, the material fairies and the material evils seem to be at war with each other. When the three meet, Dosshiru and Shisshin start chasing Bun-chan and soon destroy it, leaving Kisa very upset that Bun-chan is gone. After a while, the connection of Kisa's fish metal fin starts glowing. As the fish turns into a sprite form of Bun-chan, Kisa decides to name it Po-chan.

The city's population becomes aware of the situation as pictures of the material devils and spheres of blue light, circulate among cell-phone users, accompanied by rumors that they bring good luck. Murals appear urging people to think and trust themselves. Eventually, a giant spiral resembling the metal construction of the material devils appears in the sky, and the police evacuate a section of the city. Some of the same phenomena are present in Tana, such as the failure of electronic devices.

== Characters ==
=== Summer Arc ===
Ayumu Aizawa (逢沢歩, Aizawa Ayumu)
Voiced by: Toshiyuki Toyonaga
Miki Miyama (深山美紀, Miyama Miki)
Voiced by: Kanako Mitsuhashi
Miku Miyama (深山美玖, Miyama Miku)
Voiced by: Chiwa Saitō
Ryūsuke Sakakura (阪倉亮介, Sakakura Ryūsuke)
Voiced by: Yakkun Sakurazuka
Shione Unno (海野潮音, Unno Shione)
Voiced by: Ai Shimizu
Takuma Kaburaki (鏑木拓馬, Kaburaki Takuma)
Voiced by: Yasuyuki Kase
Wakkun (わっくん)
Voiced by: Junko Takeuchi
Heigorō Suzuki (鈴木平五郎, Suzuki Heigorō)
Voiced by: Katsuhisa Hōki
Asako Tōdō (藤堂麻子, Tōdō Asako)
Voiced by: Risa Mizuno
Akira Sukawara (須河原晶, Sukawara Akira)
Voiced by: Miwa Matsumoto
Mika Miyama (深山美佳, Miyama Mika)
Voiced by: Masami Suzuki
Akiyuki Kishiro (稀代秋之, Kishiro Akiyuki)
Voiced by: Kenji Hamada
Junko Aizawa (逢沢淳子, Aizawa Junko)
Voiced by: Kaori Yamagata
Shirō Dōmaru (堂丸史郎, Dōmaru Shirō)
Voiced by: Tadahisa Saizen
Okaka Baba (オカカ婆, Okaka Babā)
Voiced by: Yakkun Sakurazuka
Taruto (タルト)
Voiced by: Ai Shimizu
Roku (ロク)
Voiced by: Katsuhisa Hōki
Mikoshiba-san (御子柴さん)

=== Winter Arc ===
Kisa Tanigawa (谷川希紗, Tanigawa Kisa)
Voiced by: Akiko Kobayashi
Rieko Yamato (大和理絵子, Yamato Rieko)
Voiced by: Tomoko Sadohara
Masaki Makabe (真壁正樹, Makabe Masaki)
Voiced by: Yuki Kaida
Shigeki Kobayakawa (小早川成基, Kobayakawa Shigeki)
Voiced by: Takahiro Sakurai
Jirō Hatori (羽鳥次郎, Hatori Jirō)
Voiced by: Hozumi Gōda
Hana Tokimiya (土岐宮はな, Tokimiya Hana)
Voiced by: Misa Watanabe
Okaka Babā (オカカ婆)
