= Hitoshi Ashinano =

Japanese manga artist

- Born: April 25, 1963 (age 63); Yokosuka, Kanagawa Prefecture, Japan
- Occupation: Manga artist

Hitoshi Ashinano (芦奈野ひとし, Ashinano Hitoshi; born April 25, 1963) is a Japanese manga artist. He is most noted for Yokohama Kaidashi Kikou, for which he won the 2007 Seiun Award for Best Science Fiction Manga. Another notable work is PositioN. Prior to his debut, Ashinano worked as an assistant to manga artist Kōsuke Fujishima.

== Works ==
- Kotonoba Drive (コトノバドライブ, Kotonoba Doraibu) (2014–2017, Monthly Afternoon)
- Kabu no Isaki (カブのイサキ) (2007–2012, Monthly Afternoon)
- Kumabachi no koto (くまばちのこと) (February 2007, Monthly Afternoon)
- Pass (峠, Tōge) (May 2006, Monthly Afternoon) (included in the 10th volume of the new edition of Yokohama Kaidashi Kikou)
- PositioN (1999–2001, Afternoon Season Zōkan and Bessatsu Morning)
- Turbo Type S (2006, tribute manga for E no Moto)
- Yokohama Kaidashi Kikou (ヨコハマ買い出し紀行) (1994–2006, Monthly Afternoon)
