= Emma (manga) =

2005 Japanese historical romance manga by Kaoru Mori and anime

- First tankōbon volume cover, featuring Emma

エマ (Ema)
- Genre: Historical; Romance
- Manga
- Written by: Kaoru Mori
- Published by: Enterbrain
- English publisher: NA: CMX Comics (former); Yen Press (current)
- Magazine: Comic Beam
- Original run: January 2002 – March 2008
- Volumes: 10
- Series titles
- 1. Emma (vol. 1–7); 2. Emma: Extra Stories (vol. 8–10)
- Anime television series

Emma – A Victorian Romance
- Directed by: Tsuneo Kobayashi
- Written by: Mamiko Ikeda
- Music by: Kunihiko Ryo
- Studio: Pierrot (season 1); Ajia-do Animation Works (season 2)
- Licensed by: NA: Nozomi Entertainment; UK: Anime Limited
- Original network: Animax, BS-i, Chiba TV, NBN, SUN, Tokyo MX, tvk, TVS
- English network: IN: Animax; SEA: Animax
- Original run: April 2, 2005 – July 2, 2007
- Episodes: 24
- icon

Emma (エマ, Ema) is a Japanese historical romance manga by Kaoru Mori. It was published by Enterbrain in the magazine Comic Beam and collected in ten tankōbon volumes. The series has been adapted as an anime television series, entitled Emma – A Victorian Romance (英國戀物語エマ, Eikoku Koi Monogatari Emma). The manga is licensed in English in North America by Yen Press and the anime is licensed in English by Nozomi Entertainment.

Set in Victorian London at the end of the 19th century, Emma is the story of a housemaid who falls in love with a member of the gentry. However, the man's father and young siblings disapprove of him associating with people of the lower classes.

== Overview ==
Both the manga and anime versions of Emma are unique for being set in a setting seldom visited by either medium without some fantasy or speculative element. The author and illustrator of the manga, Kaoru Mori, is a self-professed Anglophile, and attempted to recreate 1895 London with meticulous detail. The manga has a cult following in Japan, even going as far as opening an Emma-inspired and themed maid café in Shinjuku. Its popularity has sparked an interest in English maid cosplay, even going as far as having the official Emma anime website selling Emma's "costume" for ¥45,000.

== Characters ==
Emma (エマ, Ema)
Voiced by: Yumi Tōma (Japanese); Eileen Montgomery (English)
She falls in love with William Jones from the first time they meet. Originally from a poor seaside Yorkshire village, she was kidnapped as a young girl to be sold to a London brothel. She managed to escape but became lost in London. She managed to work odd jobs for food, until she was taken under the wing of Kelly Stownar, as her housemaid. Under Mrs. Stownar, Emma was taught to read, write, and a variety of other subjects. In later chapters of the manga, it is revealed that Emma can also read a bit of French.
After the death of Mrs. Stownar, Emma leaves London, intending to go back to her village, but she ended up meeting with a maid who worked for the Mölders (Meredith in the English translation of the manga) family, German immigrants who live in a mansion in York, and Emma is hired as a servant in the Mölders' household. There, she becomes a favorite because of her fluency in English, and for this her mistress always brings Emma on distant trips, e.g. the trip to Mrs. Trollope's (Aurelia Jones') house and also the trip to London alongside a few menservants who could also speak English. She was also a well-liked maid among the staff due to her honesty and diligence in her work, as well as the children who often played with her.
William Jones (ウィリアム・ジョーンズ, Wiriamu Jōnzu)
Voiced by: Tokuyoshi Kawashima (Japanese); Ted Lewis (English)
He is the eldest son of the "House of Jones", a very wealthy merchant middle class family that is attempting to rise into the gentry. As his father's heir, he is under tremendous stress to not only take over the family business but also marry a girl from another wealthy family, preferably into the peerage. He develops feelings for Emma after their first meeting. He often intercepts her coming from Covent Garden on Regent Street. In the manga, William had told his father about Emma but his father had never seen Emma (different with the anime).
After Emma's departure, William changed drastically. He began to work very hard, attending social meetings and took care of his family's business. In his own perspectives, he never stopped regretting losing Emma, but he would live his life in the 'upper class side' as his father expected him to be. His change affected everyone around him, including Hakim. However, during the engagement party (the one with Eleanor Campbell), he unexpectedly meets Emma again, who is Dorothea Molders' companion at the time. Infused with this new hope, he gets conflicted with his engagement to Eleanor. But, that conflict helps strengthen his resolve to carry his family's business and his love for Emma.
Kelly Stownar (ケリー・ストウナー, Kerī Sutounā)
Voiced by: Taeko Nakanishi (Japanese); Erica Schroeder (English)
Emma's employer and William Jones' former governess. She married at the age of 18, but lost her husband two years into the marriage, and did not have any children. Young and educated, Mrs. Stownar decided to become a governess, and tutored William and his siblings with an iron fist. Right before retiring, she met Emma, and took her in as her maid.
Kelly was the one who taught Emma to do the household chores, to read, and to write. It was also Kelly who acted as a 'bridge' between Emma and William, although she realized that the relationship between Emma and William would never work out smoothly.
Hakim Atawari (ハキム・アタワーリ, Hakimu Atawāri)
Voiced by: Yūji Ueda (Japanese); James Rieser (English)
William Jones' best friend, who is a prince from India, and acts as a foil for William. He and William both attended Eton College. Somewhat of a womanizer, Hakim's straightforwardness and being outgoing is a clear departure from William's reservedness and dislike for social events. Hakim usually has his servant harem accompanying him and travels with a full complement of servants and elephants. Like William, Hakim was captivated with Emma the first time he saw her.
His stay in England was prolonged simply because he wanted to see how the relationship between Emma and William progressed. Once he found out that Emma was in love with William, he tried to encourage their relationship into something further, but he let go Emma when she said that she would go back to her hometown, and made no efforts to prevent her from leaving. When William finally proposed to Eleanor, Hakim finally said that he would go back home. To him, there was no more excitement seeing William surrender to the pressure of the society.
According to Mori, Hakim was originally intended to be a pure rival to William, but his role in the story changed as it progressed.
Eleanor Campbell (エレノア・キャンベル, Erenoa Kyanberu)
Voiced by: Sanae Kobayashi (Japanese); Jessica Calvello (English)
The young daughter of a viscount who falls in love with William. Her feelings for William are often reinforced by misunderstandings from William's courtesy and accommodation. Though her family is of the peerage, her family's financial situation is deteriorating. Due to this, her father very much wants Eleanor to marry into the wealthier, but lower class, Jones family.
Eleanor is a very shy girl, yet at the same time she always tries to catch William's attention, for example by inviting him into a tea-party in her mansion, and visiting to William's mansion for 'seeing the rose blooming'. She is very shy whenever William is around, yet finally she is able to tell him her feelings when they are watching opera. She is (almost) always accompanied by her faithful servant Annie, who takes care of her since she was a child (in the 4th volume of the manga, it was shown that since Eleanor was still a child Annie has been serving her.)
Tasha (ターシャ, Tasha)
Voiced by: Naomi Wakabayashi
Housemaid of the Mölders household. Emma first met Tasha at King's Cross railway station where she was leaving for Haworth along with her mistress Dorothea Mölders. Tasha later shared the same carriage as Emma, after learning that Emma was a maid, she suggested to her to apply for employment at Mölders household in Haworth, which was short of staff. After Emma is hired there, she and Tasha shared a servant's quarter and they became close friends.
Monica Mildrake (モニカ・ミルドレイク, Monika Mirudoreiku)
Voiced by: Kikuko Inoue (Japanese); Jessica Calvello (English)
Eleanor's older sister, who feels very protective of her. She doesn't like William and thinks he is not good enough for her sister.
Viscount Campbell (キャンベル子爵, Kyanberu Shishoku)
Voiced by: Katsunosuke Hori
Eleanor's father, a member of the nobility with strong classist views who secretly despises all non-nobles and resents the fact that lack of money forces him to accept a commoner as husband for Eleanor. This is shown drastically when, after shaking hands with Richard Jones, he throws away the glove he was wearing.
Al (アル, Aru)
Voiced by: Tomomichi Nishimura (Japanese); Bea Billany (English)
A local Jack of all Trades who knew Kelly Stownar's husband, Doug, when they were children. She often calls upon him to fix things around her house and shares her concerns about Emma with him. His relationship to Kelly is ambiguous. Most times, their banter makes them seem like siblings.
Sarah (サラ, Sara)
Voiced by: Yōko Honna (Japanese); Rhiannon Ross (English)
A minor character and the clerk at Leyton's, a shop in London often frequented by the characters of Emma. Like Emma, Sarah has come to the attention of many a young gentleman in local society. Unlike Emma, Sarah is less reserved and often puts her foot in her mouth during her scenes. This does not, however, detract from her charm. Often, her comments serve to spur the various characters of Emma to make decisions and take action.
Stevens (スティーブンス, Sutībunsu)
Voiced by: Yūji Mikimoto (Japanese); Mike Pollock (English)
The Jones family butler. He is often a go-between for William and his father, and his duty to the head of the house, Mr. Jones, often forces Stevens to seem uncaring of William's difficulties concerning his courtship of Emma. Several times, during the course of the series, Stevens has been at the sharp end of some gentleman's displeasure through no fault of his own, but his tact and devotion to the Jones family resolves every situation in a face saving gesture of servility.
Hans (ハンス, Hansu)
Voiced by: Hiroki Tōchi (Japanese); Dan Green (English)
A sullen young footman in the employment of the Mölders household. His father was a wandering clockmaker who passed on his mechanical skills to his son. His taciturn behaviour may be as a result of his regretting his father's rebellious nature, which eventually led to a nomadic and impoverished lifestyle. The unstable lifestyle of his childhood leads him to appreciate the quiet security of his current profession. He respects Emma for her strong, quiet spirit and grows protective of her as and when he notices her in her vulnerable moments.
Richard Jones
Voiced by: Akio Nojima (Japanese); Wayne Grayson (English)
Richard is William's father.
Grace Jones
Voiced by: Sayaka Ohara (Japanese); Claire Curtis-Ward (English)
Grace is the oldest of William's two sisters.
Vivian Jones
Voiced by: Kaori Mizuhashi (Japanese); Tara Tisch (English)
Vivian is William's younger sister.

=== Mölders family ===
Wilhelm Mölders (ヴィルヘルム・メルダース, Buiruherumu Merudāsu)
Voiced by: Yutaka Aoyama (Japanese); Nicholas Corda (English)
The head of the Mölders household. A German merchant who moved to England together with his family. He is shown to be fond of his children and having a wide perspectives, in which he once told his son to say 'thank you' even towards servants, "because that is what a gentleman should do". It seems that difference of class doesn't matter to him as much it does to English people at that time. He is a bit ignorant of a person, in which Dorothea always pushes him about the matter of education for their daughter Ilse.
Dorothea Mölders (ドロテア・メルダース, Dorotea Merudāsu)
Voiced by: Gara Takashima (Japanese); Erica Schroeder (English)
The wife of Wilhelm Mölders. Often acts as a bridge between the Mölders family and the other upper-class families, Dorothea frequently goes on parties and dinners on behalf of her husband, accompanied by a servant who takes care of her dresses and make-ups. She is shown to be careless, for she mistakes Emma as her personal assistant Tasha in King's Cross station and she takes Emma to her residence in York just because 'that girl seems to get along well with Tasha.' She is a close friend of Mrs. Trollope (later revealed as Aurelia, William's mother). Kaoru Mori personally noted that the role model for Dorothea is the opera singer Maria Callas.
Erich Mölders (エーリヒ・メルダース, Ērihi Merudāsu)
The first Mölders' child, shown as a boy around 6-7 ten years old. He has a pet squirrel named Theo, and it seems that he likes his pet very much seeing that it frequently accompanies him. Erich speaks no English. In his first meeting with Emma, Theo was stuck in his bedpost's canopy and Emma helped him bringing Theo down although Emma couldn't speak German. Later, Erich expressed his gratitude toward Emma by kissing her on the cheek in front of parents, which surprised them.
Ilse Mölders (イルゼ・メルダース, Iruze Merudāsu)
The youngest child in Mölders household. In the manga, it was stated that Ilse is 5 years old. Ilse is a shy and quiet child yet adorable, so it seems that the servants like her very much. She is shown to inherit her mother's dark hair, and she has a favorite elephant doll, which is probably given by the servants on her birthday party.

== Media ==
Emma as depicted in volume 1 of the manga

=== Manga ===
Written and illustrated by Kaoru Mori, Emma was serialized in Enterbrain's seinen manga magazine Comic Beam from the January 2002 to the May 2006 issues. Enterbrain collected its 52 chapters in seven tankōbon volumes, released from August 30, 2002, to May 25, 2006. From the third volume onward, Rico Murakami served as historical consultant to ensure the historical accuracy of the manga. Additional stories, known as Emma: Extra Stories (エマ 番外編, Ema Bangaihen), were published in Comic Beam from the September 2006 to the March 2008 issues. These chapters were collected in volumes 8–10, released from March 26, 2007, to April 25, 2008.

In North America, the manga was first licensed by CMX Comics, which released ten volumes from September 20, 2006, to December 8, 2009. In October 2014, Yen Press announced that they had licensed the manga, and released in five omnibus edition volumes from May 19, 2015, to August 23, 2016. In September 2018, Yen Press announced the digital release of the manga.

==== Volumes ====
No.	Original release date	Original ISBN	English release date	English ISBN
1	August 30, 2002	4-7577-0972-2	September 20, 2006	978-1-4012-1132-5
2	February 24, 2003	4-7577-1312-6	December 20, 2006	978-1-4012-1133-2
3	November 25, 2003	4-7577-1642-7	March 31, 2007	978-1-4012-1134-9
4	May 26, 2004	4-7577-1887-X	June 20, 2007	978-1-4012-1135-6
5	March 31, 2005	4-7577-2168-4	September 30, 2007	978-1-4012-1136-3
6	August 31, 2005	4-7577-2403-9	December 31, 2007	978-1-4012-1137-0
7	May 25, 2006	4-7577-2787-9	March 31, 2008	978-1-4012-1737-2
8	March 26, 2007	4-7577-3449-2	March 11, 2009	978-1-4012-2070-9
9	September 25, 2007	4-7577-3726-2	July 7, 2009	978-1-4012-2071-6
10	April 25, 2008	978-4757741782	December 8, 2009	978-1-4012-2072-3

=== Other books ===
==== Novelizations ====
The novelisations are written by Saori Kumi, and based upon the original manga.

1. Volume 1 (March 22, 2005) ISBN 4-7577-2209-5
2. Volume 2 (October 29, 2005) ISBN 4-7577-2490-X

==== Victorian Guide ====
1. Emma Victorian Guide by Kaoru Mori and Rico Murakami (November 25, 2003) ISBN 4-7577-1643-5

==== Animation guides ====
1. Emma Animation Guide Vol. 1 by Kaoru Mori and Rico Murakami (November 4, 2005) ISBN 4-7577-2446-2
2. Emma Animation Guide Vol. 2 by Kaoru Mori and Rico Murakami (February 10, 2006) ISBN 4-7577-2597-3
3. Emma Animation Guide Vol. 3 by Kaoru Mori and Rico Murakami (June 6, 2006) ISBN 4-7577-2788-7

=== Anime ===
Emma and William as depicted in episode 1 of the anime

The manga was adapted into a TV anime series, entitled Emma – A Victorian Romance (英國戀物語エマ, Eikoku Koi Monogatari Emma), directed by Tsuneo Kobayashi, scripted by Mamiko Ikeda, and produced by Studio Pierrot and TBS. The first season of the anime series premiered between April 2 and June 18, 2005, across Japan on several UHF TV stations, BS-i and the CS TV network Animax, who have also later aired the series across its respective networks worldwide, including Hong Kong and Taiwan, also translating and dubbing the series into English for its English language networks in Southeast Asia and South Asia, and other regions.

The Japanese title of the anime is written using a couple of kanji from before the adoption of simplified characters after the end of World War II, which reflects the usage of kanji in the time period the story is set in. In modern Japanese 英國戀物語 (Eikoku Koi Monogatari, lit. English Lovestory or Lovestory in England) would be written as 英国恋物語, the characters for country and love being replaced by their modern variants. The series' official English title is Emma - A Victorian Romance.

The series' depiction of Victorian England was accurate, with locations such as London's King's Cross station, The Crystal Palace, Covent Garden, Mudie's Lending Library and such vehicles and applications of the era, such as Henson's Aerial Steam Carriage, recreated in meticulous detail.

The anime series was continued in a second season, Emma – A Victorian Romance: Second Act (英國戀物語エマ 第二幕, Eikoku Koi Monogatari Emma Dai Ni Maku), which premiered in Japan on numerous television stations from April 16, 2007. Animated by Ajia-do Animation Works and directed by Tsuneo Kobayashi and written by Mamiko Ikeda, the second season was first announced by the anime's official website in August 2006 and the September 2006 issue of manga publisher Enterbrain's Comic Beam magazine, in which the original manga has been serialized.

Both seasons have been licensed in English by Nozomi Entertainment, with a box set of the first season released on June 24, 2008, in English subtitles. On September 18, 2018, Nozomi Entertainment launched a Kickstarter campaign in an attempt to gather funds to produce an English dub for season 1 for $110,000, along with a $180,000 stretch goal for season 2, following their successful Kickstarter campaign in 2017 for Aria; the campaign ended on October 18 of that same year, as a success, with a total of $253,834 raised; 130% over the original goal.

==== Original soundtracks ====
Two pieces of theme music are used for both seasons; one opening theme and one ending theme each. The first season's opening theme is "Silhouette of a Breeze" composed and arranged by Kunihiko Ryo, and the ending theme is "Menuet for EMMA" composed by Kunihiko Ryo, arranged by Kenji Kaneko, and performed by the Tokyo Recorder Orchestra. The second season's opening theme is a "Celtic Version" of "Silhouette of a Breeze" and the ending theme is "Rondo of Lilybell". Both "Menuet for EMMA" and "Rondo of Lilybell," are done mostly with a recorder. A "String Quartet Version" of "Silhouette of a Breeze" was the BGM used when introducing the show's sponsors at the beginning and end of each episode.

Album: Victorian romance Emma original soundtrack album – Silhouette of a Breeze

Release date: June 15, 2005

Track list:

01	Silhouette of a Breeze	3:06
02	Love at First Sight	2:07
03	Emma	2:38
04	Lace Handkerchief	2:43
05	Menuet for Emma	1:33
06	Society	2:38
07	Solitude	2:13
08	Crystal Palace	2:20
09	Silhouette of a Breeze (piano solo)	2:08
10	With Him	2:10
11	Emma (Piano solo)	2:58
12	The Season	2:10
13	Solitude (recorder ver.)	2:55
14	Separation	2:50
15	Confession	2:05
16	Menuet for Emma (piano solo)	1:58
17	Emma (harpsichord ver.)	2:19
18	William's Love	2:14
19	Silhouette of a Breeze (recorder ver.)	3:07

Album: Victorian romance Emma second act original soundtrack album – Memories

Release date: June 20, 2007

Track list:

01	Memory (strings ver.)	2:44
02	Silhouette of a Breeze (Celt ver.)	3:06
03	Curiosity	1:48
04	Diary	3:02
05	Waltz for Emma & William	2:40
06	Desire	2:17
07	The Belle of the Ball	3:16
08	EMMA (recorder ver.)	2:17
09	Distrust	1:50
10	Difference	2:47
11	Rondo of Lilybell (harpsichord ver.)	1:39
12	Mölders	1:55
13	Nostalgia	2:28
14	Innocence	1:48
15	Servant's Ball	2:00
16	Hope against Hope	2:10
17	Upstairs, Downstairs	2:19
18	Tragic Love	1:44
19	Repose	1:45
20	rondo of Lilybell	2:39
21	Purity	2:16
22	Silhouette of a Breeze (strings ver.)	2:50
23	Memory (recorder ver.)	2:44

== Reception ==
The manga of Emma was awarded an Excellence Prize at the 2005 Japan Media Arts Festival. The English translation was listed by Library Journal as one of the best graphic novels of 2007 and was named by the Young Adult Library Services Association as among the 10 best graphic novels for teens for 2008.
