= Paul-Jacques Bonzon =

French writer

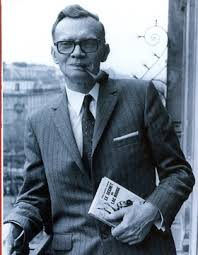
- Paul Jacques Bonzon
- Born: 31 August 1908; Sainte-Marie-du-Mont, France
- Died: 24 September 1978 (aged 70); Valence, Drôme
- Writing career
- Language: French
- Genre: children's literature

Paul-Jacques Bonzon (31 August 1908 – 24 September 1978) was a French writer, best known for the series Les six compagnons ("Six companions").

== Biography ==
He was born in Sainte-Marie-du-Mont, Manche and educated in Saint-Lô. In 1935 he married a teacher in Drôme and moved to a department, where he worked as a school teacher and later principal for twenty-five years. He died in Valence in 1978

== Publications ==
- Mamadi ou le petit roi d'ébène
- Le petit passeur du lac
- Du gui pour Christmas
- The Orphans of Simitra (Les orphelins de Simitra). Adapted by Nippon Animation into the anime series Porphy no Nagai Tabi.
- Le cheval de verre
- Soleil de mon Espagne
- La promesse de Primerose
- Un secret dans la nuit polaire
- The gold cross of Santa Anna (La croix d'or de Santa-Anna)
- Le viking au bracelet d'argent
- La disparue de Montélimar
- Mon Vercors en feu
- Le voyageur sans visage
- La ballerine de Majorque
- L'Éventail de Séville
