= Osamu Kobayashi (animation director) =

Japanese animator and animation director (born 1945)

Osamu Kobayashi (小林 治, Kobayashi Osamu; born January 9, 1945) is a Japanese animator and animation director, best known for Creamy Mami, the Magic Angel. He was born in Fuchuu-shi, Tokyo and belongs to Ajia-do Animation Works. In 1963, he entered Toei Animation at the same time as Tsutomu Shibayama and Hayao Miyazaki. He was a chief animator working with Shibayama, after having transferred to A Production (predecessor to Shin-Ei Animation). Eventually, he established Ajia-do Animation Works with Shibayama in 1978.

At the 2019 Tokyo Anime Awards, he won an award for animation.

== Filmography ==
- Creamy Mami, the Magic Angel
- Kimagure Orange Road
- Onegai! Samia-don
- Chiisana Obake Acchi, Kocchi, Socchi
