= Tomomi Mochizuki =

Japanese anime director

- Born: December 31, 1958 (age 67); Hokkaido, Japan
- Other name: Gō Sakamoto
- Occupations: Storyboard artist, screenwriter, director

Tomomi Mochizuki (望月 智充, Mochizuki Tomomi; born December 31, 1958), sometimes incorrectly spelled as Tomomichi Mochizuki, is a Japanese storyboard artist, screenwriter, and director, known for having collaborated with leading animation studios such as Studio Ghibli, Nippon Animation, Pierrot, and Sunrise. He sometimes uses the alias Gō Sakamoto (坂本 郷, Sakamoto Gō) when writing screenplays or working on storyboards.

== Biography ==
While attending Waseda University, Mochizuki became interested in animation and he joined the Waseda University Animation Association. In 1981, he began working for Ajia-do Animation Works. Mochizuki made his debut one year later when he acted as production director of the 1982 series Tokimeki Tonight. He went on to direct several of the magical girl series, including Magical Angel Creamy Mami. In 1986, he moved up to chief director with Hikari no Densetsu.

Mochizuki became known from the early 1990s as director of Ranma ½, Kimagure Orange Road and the Studio Ghibli TV movie Ocean Waves, he is also known for having directed Twin Spica, Zettai Shounen, the acclaimed World Masterpiece Theater series Porphy no Nagai Tabi. More recently he directed the noitaminA series House of Five Leaves in 2010 and Battery in 2016.

He currently divides his time between directing, writing scripts and acting as a series coordinator for various shows.

He is married to fellow animator Masako Gotō.

== Works ==
- Absolute Boy (director, storyboards)
- Ballad of a Shinigami (director, storyboards, production director, sound effects director)
- Battery (director, series composition)
- Brave Command Dagwon (director, screenplay (as "Gō Sakamoto"))
- Brave Command Dagwon: The Boy with Crystal Eyes (Director, Storyboard)
- Code Geass: Lelouch of the Rebellion (storyboards (as "Gō Sakamoto"))
- Chimpui (storyboards, production director)
- Creamy Mami, the Magic Angel (Episode Director)
- Doraemon (various storyboards during the Ōyama period))
- Dirty Pair Flash II (director)
- Dirty Pair Flash III (director, screenplay (as "Gō Sakamoto"))
- Eight Clouds Rising (director, screenplay (as "Gō Sakamoto"))
- Esper Mami (storyboards, production director)
- Here Is Greenwood (director, screenplay)
- Hikari no Densetsu (director)
- House of Five Leaves (Saraiya Goyō) (series direction, composition, screenplay and sound direction; title sequences and episode 1 and 12 direction and storyboards)
- Ocean Waves (director)
- I My Me! Strawberry Eggs (storyboards (as "Gō Sakamoto"))
- Kage Kara Mamoru! (OP and ED production director (as "Gō Sakamoto"))
- Kimagure Orange Road: I Want to Return to That Day (director)
- Maison Ikkoku: Kanketsuhen (Director, Script)
- My Dear Marie (director)
- Mysterious Disappearances (director, screenplay)
- Nintama Rantarō (screenplay, storyboards, production director)
- Princess Nine (director)
- Pupa (director)
- Rainy Cocoa (director, storyboards)
- Ranma ½ (storyboards, production director)
- Rinshi Ekoda-chan (director (ep. 4))
- Rozen Maiden: Zurückspulen (Series Composition, Script (eps. 1-13), Sound Director)
- Seraphim Call (director, screenplay (as "Gō Sakamoto"))
- Superior Defender Gundam Force (Episode Director)
- Tōka Gettan (Series Composition, Scenario (eps. 1–5, 10, 14, 17, 19, 24-26), Theme Song Lyrics (OP/ED))
- Twilight Q Time Knot: Reflection (director)
- Twin Spica (director, series coordinator, screenplay, storyboards)
- Yami to Bōshi to Hon no Tabibito (series coordinator)
- Yokohama Kaidashi Kikou (director, screenplay)
