= Porphy no Nagai Tabi =

Japanese anime television series

- ポルフィの長い旅
- Genre: Drama, adventure, historical
- Based on: The Orphans of Simitra by Paul-Jacques Bonzon
- Written by: Kei Kunii
- Directed by: Tomomi Mochizuki
- Voices of: Yuki Kaida; Ayumi Fujimura; Kazuhiko Inoue; Sumi Shimamoto; Toshiyuki Toyonaga
- Music by: MOKA☆
- Country of origin: Japan
- Original language: Japanese
- No. of episodes: 52 (list of episodes)

Production
- Executive producer: Kōichi Motohashi
- Producers: Atsushi Tanaka; Isao Takahashi
- Production company: Nippon Animation

Original release
- Network: BS Fuji
- Release: 6 January – 28 December 2008

Porphy no Nagai Tabi (ポルフィの長い旅, Porufi no Nagai Tabi; lit. The Long Journey of Porphy) is a Japanese anime series by Nippon Animation, as the 25th installment of the World Masterpiece Theater series. It is an adaptation of Paul-Jacques Bonzon's novel, The Orphans of Simitra (Les Orphelins de Simitra).

It aired across Japan from January to December 2008 on BS Fuji. It spanned 52 episodes.

== Plot ==
The series focuses on a Greek boy named Porphyras Patagos (more fondly known as Porphy) and his sister Mina, who have been orphaned after a devastating earthquake which destroyed their home in Greece. The two decide to travel through Europe in search of a new home rather than being put in a foster home and split apart, but things turn bad when they are separated. Porphy must travel across Europe to find his little sister.

== Characters ==
- Porphyras "Porphy" Patagos: One of the main characters, Porphy is a 12 year old boy who has a love of automobiles. Porphy is among the survivors of the earthquake that ravaged his village of Simitra. He and Mina are reunited in the finale.
- Marina "Mina" Patagos: Porphy's little sister, and one of the main characters, Mina managed to survive the earthquake, but was injured. Grief-stricken, she ends up separated from Porphy and in the company of a fortuneteller named Isabella until an incident with Carlos causes her to bring Mina to Tiffany Aubert for a part in a film. She and Porphy are reunited in the finale.
- Zaïmis: A classmate and friend of Porphy and Mina, he is among the survivors of the earthquake. He, his mom, Dori, and baby sister, Elpida, move to Timiza where his aunt lives. He meets up with Porphy in Paris.
- Tony: One of the people who survived the earthquake.
- Anek Patagos: Porphy and Mina's mother, Anek was originally the daughter of a rich family. Her mother died when she was young. As confirmed by Barnes, she didn't survive the earthquake.
- Louisa: One of the survivors of the earthquake that ravaged Simitra along with her son.
- Thomas: Zaïmis' father, he is among those who didn't survive the earthquake.
- Dori: Zaïmis' mother who becomes pregnant with her second child, a girl Zaïmis names Elpida, who is born following the earthquake.
- Apollo: Porphy and Mina's pet owl, he managed to survive the earthquake that ravaged Simitra, and remains as Porphy's companion on his search for Mina. He gets shot by a hunter in episode 43 while defending Porphy.
- Corina: A spoiled girl who is the daughter of the village mayor, she had an interest in Zaïmis. Corina and her family are among those who didn't survive the earthquake.
- Barnes Smith: A US army man Porphy met.
- Christophore Patagos: Porphy and Mina's father, he lost his parents and family when he was young. As confirmed by Barnes, he didn't survive the earthquake.
- Nicholas: A man who helps with construction of a service station.
- Alessia: A girl Porphy initially mistook for a boy. She has travelled with her father ever since her mother died. She has a crush on Porphy, and once kissed him on the lips while he was sleeping.
- Helena: An old school friend of Anek's.
- Martha Smith: Barnes' wife.
- John Smith: Barnes' first born son.
- Tom Smith: Barnes' second born son, and John's little brother.
- Mary Smith: Barnes' daughter, and John and Tom's baby sister.
- Kafes: A man who meets with Christophore about delivering a gasp pump.
- Damon: A travelling bearded man who survived the earthquake that ravaged the village of Simitra.
- Elena: A nun at the church in Simitra.
- Elpida: Zaïmis' baby sister who was born following the earthquake.
- Lucas: A man who delivers supplies to the shelter following the earthquake.
- Isabella: A woman whom Mina meets while separated from Porphy. She has a daughter named Lili, whom she claims looks like Mina, and she died of illness.
- Carlos: Isabella's husband and assistant who constantly gambles to help get by. He dislikes the idea of having Mina being in their group.
- Django: Isabella's father.
- Angelopoulos: An old man who's been living on his own since the death of his wife. Porphy paints his house in order to get a boat fee to find Mina.
- Marika: A young girl Porphy befriends on his search for Mina.
- Leon: A teenager who takes pity on Porphy.
- Dora: An old woman whose husband died prior to the series, as well as a child named Antonio.
- Daisy: An 11-year old girl who Porphy meets on a train. She lives with her grandmother, and only visits her father on vacations.
- Maximilian: A guitar player Porphy meets.
- Ilaria: Maximillian's girlfriend whose family makes olive oil.
- Anton, Alain, and Delia: Maximilian's dogs.
- Rebecca: A woman who was once Ilaria's friend, but grew to hate her due to her relationship with Maximilian. Through Porphy's efforts, Rebecca and Ilaria manage to make up their quarrel.
- Dario: Daisy's father who works in leather.
- Michael: A boy from Sicily.
- Andre Macini: A Sicilian who despises Americans.
- Monica Mancini: Andre's little sister.
- Jack Barbazza: One of Michael's big brothers, a former air force pilot who was involved in the Korean War and is Monica's love interest.
- Edward: One of Michael's big brother.
- Bobby: A member of Jack's mob in Sicily.
- Loco: A member of Andre's mob.
- Father Alvari: A man of the church on Sicily.
- Don Macini: Father of Andre and Monica.
- Bruno: A hotel owner in Rome.
- Heinz von Eisenfeld: A sickly German boy Mina meets in her travels with Isabella.
- Count Carl von Eisenfeld: Heinz's rich father who tries to adopt Mina so Heinz will be happy.
- Guido: A teenager who is a leader of a gang. He shows kindness to Porphy but only to deceive him in stealing a car.
- Giorgio: One of Guido's member in his gang who is wary around Porphy's presence. In the end, he was the one who helped him and tell him that Guido is a traitor.
- Marta: Antonio's wife.
- Sofia: Antonio and Marta's daughter, she has a doll she named Bianca, and helps care for her ailing grandmother, Angela.
- Mario: A man who offers Porphy an orange.
- Father Juliani: A wandering priest Porphy meets.
- Marissa: A woman who wears a mask to hide her disfigured face and made it seem like she lived with someone named Sandra. She gets mocked by kids due to the fact that she wears a mask. Porphy encourages her to remove her mask, and that she's beautiful regardless of her face.
- Bernard: An old dog that Porphy befriends along the way. He makes a cross for the dog when it passes away.
- Samuel: A man with a scar on his right cheek.
- Cécile: Samuel's daughter.
- Maurice: Samuel's first born son, and Cécile's little brother.
- Lune: Samuel's second born son, and Cécile's youngest brother.
- Tiffany Aubert: An actress in the movies "The Moonlight Waltz" and "The Song of the Angel", she starts caring for Mina as a favor for Isabella.
- Marianne: A woman whose daughter was taken by Germans during World War II.
- Cristal: Marianne's daughter.
- Giselle: A girl Porphy briefly mistook for Mina.
- Xaropoulos: A man who works a Greek cuisine place in Paris.
- Alex: A chef working with Xaropoulos.
- Rose: A young woman who knew Tiffany Aubert.
- Noel: Rose's cat.
- Pascal: Tiffany Aubert's manager.
- Natalie: Tiffany's maid.
- Emilie: A make-up artist who helps with the filming of "The Song of the Angel".

== Anime ==
The opening theme is "Porphy no Nagai Tabi" (ポルフィの長い旅) sung by Ikuko. The ending theme is "Kimi e to Tsuzuku Michi" (君へと続く道) sung by Da Capo. An insert song used in episode 39 is "Shimitora e no Omoi" (シミトラへの想い) sung by Ikuko.

No.	Title	Original air date
1	"The Letter From Papa"; Transliteration: "Tōsan Karano Tegami" (Japanese: 父さんからの手紙)	January 6, 2008
Porphy, a 12-year-old boy, lives peacefully with his mother, Anek, and his younger sister, Mina, in the village of Simitra, Greece. Their simple daily life consists of Porphy and Mina attending school while their mother tends to their small farm located beside their home. Porphy and Mina also a friend named Zaimis who also their classmate. The family also keeps a small flock of goats. Porphy is particularly fascinated by automobiles. Whenever he sees one passing by, he often becomes distracted, much to the annoyance of his younger sister, Mina. One day, their ordinary routine is interrupted when a letter arrives from Porphy's father, who works as a mechanic in the city of Athens.
2	"A Friend Came to Visit"; Transliteration: "Tomodachi ga Yattekita" (Japanese: 友達がやってきた)	January 13, 2008
Several days passed and a package arrived for Porphy from his father in Athens. Inside were several gifts for the family. Porphy received a book filled with information about different kinds of automobiles, much to his excitement. Mina received a book containing fascinating stories about the Greek gods, including Zeus, Athena, and many others. Anek also received a thoughtful gift from her husband. One day, Porphy and Mina were surprised to discover a small owl in their attic where the siblings sleep. Curious and delighted by their unexpected visitor, the two siblings slowly befriended it and decided to keep it as a pet. They named the owl Apollo, and from then on, it would occasionally visit them at their home, becoming a beloved companion to the family.
3	"Picking up Papa"; Transliteration: "Tōsan o Mukaeni" (Japanese: 父さんを迎えに)	January 20, 2008
The long-awaited day finally arrived when Porphy and Mina's father was scheduled to return home. The two siblings were overjoyed and eagerly asked their mother if they could be the ones to pick him up at the bus station. Their mother agreed, and the children happily made their way into town to wait for their father's bus. While waiting, Porphy and Mina wandered around the town for a while. By the time their father's bus finally arrived, it was already night. The moment Porphy and Mina saw their father step off the bus, they happily ran to greet him. After their joyful reunion, the family returned home together.
4	"Mina's Birthday"; Transliteration: "Mina no Tanjōbi" (Japanese: ミーナの誕生日)	January 27, 2008
It was Mina's tenth birthday, and Porphy had secretly prepared a special gift for his younger sister—a necklace with a wooden pendant that he had carefully carved with Apollo's face. To celebrate the occasion, the family decided to visit an ancient performance stage. They brought along a picnic and spent the day together, enjoying a simple but meaningful celebration for Mina's birthday. While they were there, Anek shared stories about the history of the ancient stage and the performances that had once taken place there. Inspired by her mother's stories and the atmosphere of the ancient theater, Mina began imagining herself as a singer performing on a grand opera stage. She excitedly shared one of her dreams with her family: to become a singer and perform for an audience someday. As the day came to an end, Porphy finally presented Mina the necklace he had made for her. Mina was delighted by the thoughtful gift, cherishing the special present from her brother.
5	"Our Station"; Transliteration: "Bokutachi no Sutēshon" (Japanese: ぼくたちのステーション)	February 3, 2008
Christophore, Porphy's father, had begun planning to build a small automobile service station near their home. The station would provide a place where damaged or malfunctioning vehicles could be brought in for repairs. Porphy was thrilled by his father's plans and was eager to help with the construction. His excitement, however, led him to make a poor decision. Porphy began skipping school so he could help his father build the service station. Zaimis tried to stop him, reminding Porphy that cutting class was wrong, but Porphy refused to listen. He even lied to his father, claiming that their teacher had dismissed the class early, which was why he had already returned home. After several days of hard work, the service station was finally completed. Feeling guilty about his actions, Porphy decided to confess to his father that he had been lying and skipping school. Christophore was shocked and disappointed by his son's dishonesty. He sternly told Porphy that a child who lies was no child of his, leaving Porphy, Mina, and Zaimis stunned by his words. However, despite his disappointment, Christophore eventually forgave Porphy after seeing that his son genuinely regretted what he had done.
6	"The Girl Who Came From Italy"; Transliteration: "Itaria Kara Kita Shōjo" (Japanese: イタリアから来た少女)	February 10, 2008
One day, Porphy, Mina, and Zaimis were walking home from school when they noticed a truck that had broken down along the road. Curious and eager to help, Porphy immediately ran over to inspect it. He offered to bring the truck to their family's service station, and the driver gladly agreed. Since the truck's engine would not start, Porphy, Zaimis, and the young passenger traveling with the driver began pushing it toward the service station. Christophore soon noticed them and joined in to help push the heavy vehicle. As they struggled to move the truck, Porphy became slightly disappointed with the young passenger, thinking that despite being a boy, he was surprisingly weak. The child then revealed that she was actually a girl named Alessia, much to Porphy's surprise. Alessia explained that the truck driver was her father and that they were from Italy. They had been traveling across Europe, delivering various goods with their truck. Since Alessia's mother had passed away two years earlier, she had been traveling with her father ever since. After Christophore finished repairing the truck, Alessia's father asked Porphy's family if they could look after his daughter for the day. He wanted to make his deliveries around town without having to bring Alessia along. Although Alessia was unhappy about being left behind, she reluctantly agreed. While Alessia stayed under the care of the Patagos family, Porphy, Mina, and Zaimis took her on a tour around their village. Eventually, night fell, and Alessia's father returned to pick her up. Before leaving, Alessia expressed her gratitude to Porphy and his family for their kindness.
7	"The Thing That Porphy Wants"; Transliteration: "Porufi no Hoshii Mono" (Japanese: ポルフィの欲しいもの)	February 17, 2008
One day, Porphy's family decided to watch a movie in the town of Ioannina. Porphy and Mina were very excited about the trip. However, when they arrived in Ioannina, they were surprised to learn that their father, Christophore, would not be joining them because he needed to go to the bank. Porphy, Mina, and Anek watched the movie together, and afterward, they were excited to tell their father all about it. Meanwhile, Christophore informed Anek that the bank had denied his loan application. On their way home, they stopped at a gasoline station to buy fuel for the vehicle they had borrowed. Porphy was fascinated by how the gasoline station operated, and he dreamed of having one beside their service station someday. However, Christophore and Anek explained that they did not have enough money to build one, especially since the bank had refused to give them a loan. Hearing this, Porphy felt disappointed.
8	"Late Night Operation"; Transliteration: "Mayonaka no Sakusen" (Japanese: 真夜中の作戦)	February 24, 2008
Patagos' service station was struggling with low earnings. Porphy began thinking of ways to attract more customers. He eventually came up with a harmful plan: he bought some nails and intended to scatter them on the road at night so that passing cars would get flat tires and be forced to visit Patagos' service station for repairs. Zaimis and Mina tried to stop Porphy, but he refused to listen. That night, he carried out his plan and scattered the nails along the road. However, afterward, his conscience began to bother him. Feeling guilty about what he had done, Porphy returned to the road to collect the nails. While retrieving them, he was nearly hit by a car and lost consciousness. When Porphy woke up, he was already at home. To his surprise, he discovered that the person who had almost hit him was Mr. Barnes, the American soldier he had befriended.
9	"A New World"; Transliteration: "Atarashī sekai" (Japanese: 新しい世界)	March 2, 2008
Mr. Barnes learned that Porphy's family owned and operated a service station. He then introduced Patagos' service station to the nearby military camp, where they offered Christophore the opportunity to become the camp's official car repairman, servicing the soldiers' vehicles. After discussing the offer as a family, the Patagos decided to accept it. Mr. Barnes then took Christophore to the military base to discuss the contract. Mina and Porphy asked to come along, and Mr. Barnes agreed. While Christophore was meeting with the soldiers, Mina and Porphy stayed at Mr. Barnes' house and explored the area. During their time there, they met two brothers, John, the older brother, and Tom, the younger one. They lived at the military camp with their mother and youngest sister, Mary, because their father was also a soldier. John and Tom taught Porphy how to play baseball, and they all became friends. They also shared stories about American life and culture, which fascinated both Porphy and Mina. Through these experiences, Porphy began to realize how big the world really was. He became curious about the many different countries and places around the world and started dreaming of traveling and exploring them someday.
10	"A Summer Day"; Transliteration: "Natsu no Ichinichi" (Japanese: 夏の一日)	March 9, 2008
The summer starts. John and Tom's father visited Patagos' service station to have his car repaired, and the two brothers came along because they wanted to spend time with Porphy and Mina. While their father's car was being fixed, Porphy, Mina, John and Tom played outside together. They even went to a nearby lake to catch fish, where Zaimis saw them and decided to join. As the four boys enjoyed playing together, Mina sat nearby and sketched a drawing of them. Everyone had a wonderful time. Once John and Tom's father's car was repaired, it was time for them to leave. Before they departed, Mina gave each of the brothers one of her drawings as a keepsake. Their father also took a photograph of the children together so they could remember the fun time they had shared.
11	"Pump and Ice Cream"; Transliteration: "Ponpu to aisukurīmu" (Japanese: ポンプとアイスクリーム)	March 16, 2008
They continued living their ordinary lives, and after several days or even months, Christophore finally managed to save enough money to buy the gasoline pump that Porphy had always wanted. Porphy was thrilled and even took the initiative to choose the design for their new pump. Before the installation could begin, they had to dig underground to make space for the fuel tank. Porphy eagerly helped with the work, becoming so occupied that he completely forgot his promise to Zaimis to teach him how to carve a wooden doll for his soon-to-be-born sibling. Meanwhile, while waiting for Porphy, Anek decided to make some ice cream, with Zaimis and Mina helping her prepare it. When Mina told Porphy that they had made ice cream, he finally headed home. Upon arriving and seeing Zaimis, Porphy immediately felt ashamed. He realized that he had forgotten to keep his promise to his friend. Fortunately, Zaimis forgave him. The two then joined the others and enjoyed the ice cream they had made together. Before the day ended, Porphy made sure to keep his promise and finally taught Zaimis how to carve the wooden doll.
12	"The Fated Day"; Transliteration: "Unmei no Hi" (Japanese: 運命の日)	March 23, 2008
Another day passed, but Apollo began acting strangely. Even the Patagos family's goats seemed restless, as though they were sensing or being disturbed by something unusual. Despite this, the family continued with their daily lives. While inspecting the area they had dug for the fuel tank, Christophore noticed cracks forming along the cemented walls. Concerned about the damage, he instructed Porphy to visit one of their friends and ask for advice on how to repair the cracks. Porphy left the house alone, leaving his parents and Mina behind. Along the way, he met an old man named Damon, who was traveling to Simitra to visit its church. Porphy decided to accompany him, and together they made their way to the church. When they finally arrived, Porphy was about to leave when the ground suddenly began to shake violently. An earthquake struck the village of Simitra, catching everyone by surprise.
13	"Things Lost and Things Left Behind"; Transliteration: "Ushinatta Mono Nokotta Mono" (Japanese: 失ったもの残ったもの)	March 30, 2008
After the earthquake, Porphy immediately rushed back home. Along the way, he was devastated to see that nearly every house in the village had been destroyed and reduced to rubble. As he approached their property, he saw that their service station had also collapsed. He hurried to their house, only to be met with an even more heartbreaking sight. Nothing of the house's foundation remained standing. Desperate to find his family, Porphy began digging through the rubble, searching for any sign of his parents and Mina. Exhausted and overwhelmed by the devastation, he eventually fainted. Mr. Barnes soon arrived and found Porphy unconscious. He carried him to a temporary shelter that had been set up for the earthquake's victims and survivors. When Porphy regained consciousness, he found himself in the shelter. There, he met Sister Elena, a nun from the nearby church. Sister Elena led him to Mina, who was also at the shelter and unconscious because of injuries she had sustained during the earthquake. Elena reassured Porphy that Mina was safe and would be alright. Later, Mr. Barnes asked Porphy to speak with him privately by the nearby seashore. There, he delivered the heartbreaking news: Porphy's parents had both died in the earthquake. Porphy was devastated by the news, but he refused to cry. Instead, he quietly returned to the shelter and waited anxiously for Mina to wake up. When Mina finally regained consciousness, Porphy told her that their parents were gone. Mina was shocked and heartbroken upon hearing the news. Porphy also learned that the village chief's family, including Corina and Zaimis' father, had also died. Before the episode ended, Zaimis' mother, Dori, gave birth to a healthy baby girl. Zaimis named her Elpida.
14	"I'll Protect Mina"; Transliteration: "Boku wa Miina o Mamoru" (Japanese: ぼくはミーナを守る)	April 6, 2008
They continued staying in the temporary shelter, as most of the survivors had still not fully recovered from their injuries. Some were also uncertain about where they would live, as their homes had been completely destroyed. Porphy found out that some of the children who had been orphaned by the earthquake were being placed for adoption. However, it was difficult to find foster parents willing to take in two or more children, especially those who had siblings. On the other hand, after learning that her parents had died, Mina became deeply depressed and struggled to speak properly. Porphy then decided to return to their house to retrieve any belongings that could still be salvaged and used. He took Mina with him, and when they arrived at their devastated home, Porphy searched for his father's tools and took them with him. They also discovered that Apollo was still alive. The owl then accompanied them back to the temporary shelter.
15	"Embracing the Memories"; Transliteration: "Omoide o Dakishimete" (Japanese: 思い出を抱きしめて)	13 April 2008
Dori, Zaimis' mother, received a letter from one of their relatives saying that they were willing to take them in. Zaimis became sad because he knew this meant he would be separated from Porphy and Mina. However, they had no other choice. They needed to find a new place to live, and the temporary shelter was not a suitable environment for raising Elpida. In the end, Zaimis agreed to move in with his aunt. Meanwhile, Porphy saw Mr. Barnes arrive at the temporary shelter and have a private conversation with Sister Elena. Curious about their discussion, Porphy followed him and secretly listened to their conversation. He learned that a foster family had agreed to adopt Mina, but only her, and that they planned to take her to America. Upon hearing this, Porphy became afraid that he would be separated from Mina. He immediately came up with a plan for them to escape. He instructed Mina to leave first during lunch, followed by him shortly after, so that the people at the shelter would not notice that they had left together. They agreed to meet at the seashore. When the time came, however, Mina was still deeply depressed and easily distracted. On her way to the seashore, she became confused and was nearly mistaken for someone who will stole a bicycle. As she became more distracted, she unintentionally headed toward a town instead of following her brother's instructions. When Porphy arrived at the seashore and realized that Mina was not there, he became worried and nervous. He searched for her but could not find her. Given Mina's state of mind, it was understandable that she had gotten lost.
16	"Towards the Sea"; Transliteration: "Umi no Mukou He" (Japanese: 海の向こうへ)	20 April 2008
Mina wandered alone through the town of Patras, lost and unsure of where to go. Meanwhile, Porphy began searching for her and eventually arrived in Patras as well. As Mina continued wandering through the town, she caught the attention of a woman who was dancing in a bar to earn money. The woman, Isabella, became strangely interested in Mina, although she did not approach her at first. Mina eventually made her way to the town's pier, where she spotted a woman who looked remarkably like her mother. The woman was about to board a ship, and because Mina still deeply missed and longed for her mother, she followed her onto the ship, believing that she had finally found her. However, once Mina got a closer look at the woman, she realized that she was not her mother. Unfortunately, it was already too late. The ship had begun to move and was leaving the town, taking Mina with it. Meanwhile, Porphy arrived at the pier after asking several people if they had seen his sister. But he was too late—the ship had already departed, and Mina was on board. Inside the ship, Mina encountered Isabella, the same woman who had noticed her earlier at the bar. Isabella was traveling with her husband, Carlos, and her father, Django. The family traveled from town to town, earning money through gambling and fortune-telling. They were now on their way back to their hometown in Italy. Isabella had taken a particular interest in Mina because the girl reminded her of her deceased daughter. After several days of sailing, the ship finally arrived in Italy. Isabella then brought Mina with her, as she decided to take Mina under her care.
17	"The Pure White Departure"; Transliteration: "Masshiro Na Tabidachi" (Japanese: 真っ白な旅立ち)	27 April 2008
After asking several people at the pier, Porphy discovered that Mina had boarded a ship headed for Italy. Determined to follow his sister, he decided to find a way to get there as well. However, he did not have enough money to buy a ticket. As Porphy wandered through the town, desperately thinking of ways to earn money, he met someone who referred him to an elderly man named Mr. Angelopoulos. In the village, it was a yearly tradition to paint all the houses white, as the beautifully painted buildings served as a popular tourist attraction. Mr. Angelopoulos was already old and lived alone, and he could no longer paint his own house. When Porphy offered to help, the old man agreed to hire him in exchange for money. Porphy gladly accepted the job and began painting the house. During his stay, Mr. Angelopoulos also took good care of him, providing him with food and a place to rest. As they spent more time together, Porphy learned that the old man's entire family had passed away, which was why he had been living alone. After several days of hard work, Porphy finally finished painting the house. Mr. Angelopoulos paid him generously for his work and even gave him a much nicer bag to carry his belongings.
18	"Farewell, Greece"; Transliteration: "Sayonara Girisha" (Japanese: さよならギリシャ)	4 May 2008
Porphy finally earned enough money to buy a ticket for a ship headed to Italy. While waiting for the ship to depart, he met a young girl named Marika, who became interested in the owl that Porphy was carrying with him. Marika was fascinated by the owl, so Porphy introduced her to Apollo. When it was time to board the ship, Porphy was surprised to see Marika and her family again, as they were also traveling to Italy. During the journey, Marika's family kept Porphy company. After hearing his story and learning that he was searching for his missing sister, they felt sympathy for him and decided to help. Marika's father offered to ask some of the other passengers whether they had seen Mina. Since many of the passengers regularly traveled between Greece and Italy for work, he believed that someone might have information about her. Their efforts eventually gave Porphy another important lead. He learned that Mina had been taken in by a woman who was a fortune-teller. After several days at sea, the ship finally arrived in Italy.
19	"At the Italian Docks"; Transliteration: "Itaria no Minato de" (Japanese: イタリアの港で)	11 May 2008
Porphy finally arrived in Italy and began wandering through the unfamiliar town, unsure of where to go next. During his journey, he met a teenage boy named Leon, who came to his aid after Porphy was nearly tricked by a man. Leon warned Porphy to be more careful around strangers, explaining that there were people who might take advantage of him or try to scam him, especially since he was unfamiliar with the area. Leon eventually brought Porphy to the place where he worked. There, Porphy discovered that Leon was an assistant to a man named Mario, who owned and operated a service station. After learning about Porphy's situation and hearing the story of his search for Mina, Mario and Leon felt sympathy for him and welcomed him in. Mario then offered Porphy a one-day job at the service station so he could earn some money. After Porphy finished his work, Leon gave him some additional tools and supplies including a compass that could be useful during his journey. Porphy gratefully accepted them, thankful for the kindness and assistance that Leon and Mario had shown him.
20	"The City of Caverns"; Transliteration: "Doukutsu no Machi" (Japanese: 洞窟の街)	18 May 2008
Following Leon's suggestion that Mina might be somewhere in the north, Porphy decided to take a train heading in that direction. It was his first time seeing and riding a train, so he was amazed by the experience. During the journey, Porphy met a kind woman and an elderly man who kept him company. After hearing Porphy's story and learning that he was searching for his missing sister, they felt sympathy for him and tried to comfort him. While they were talking, the old man suddenly revealed that the train they were riding was not actually heading north. Instead, it was traveling west. Porphy quickly checked the compass that Leon had given him and realized that the old man was right—they were indeed heading west. Worried that he was moving farther away from Mina, Porphy immediately got off at the next station. After leaving the train, he wandered around the unfamiliar area until he came across a small town. Thinking that he might find another clue about Mina there, he decided to enter. However, the town was strangely quiet and almost seemed like a ghost town. As Porphy explored the area, he eventually became lost and, with nowhere else to go, ended up spending the night inside one of the houses. Not long after, the owner of the house arrived. She was an elderly woman named Dora. At first, she was surprised to find Porphy there, but after hearing his story, she understood his situation and felt sympathy for him. Dora explained that the town had once been lively and filled with people. However, the government eventually ordered the residents to relocate to another town. Most of the people left, but a small number, including Dora, chose to remain behind. Taking pity on the young traveler, Dora decided to let Porphy stay in her house for the night.
21	"Dora's Farewell"; Transliteration: "Doora To No Wakare" (Japanese: ドーラとの別れ)	25 May 2008
22	"Continuing Down the Train Line"; Transliteration: "Senro wa Tsuzuku Yo" (Japanese: 線路はつづくよ)	1 June 2008
23	"The Cracked Doll"; Transliteration: "Hibiwareta Nin'gyō" (Japanese: ひび割れた人形)	8 June 2008
24	"The Place Where Smiles Come Back"; Transliteration: "Egao No Kaeru Basho" (Japanese: 笑顔の帰る場所)	15 June 2008
25	"A Little Friendship in a Little City"; Transliteration: "Chiisana Machi No Chiisana Yuujou" (Japanese: 小さな街の小さな友情)	22 June 2008
26	"If I Can Hear The Whistle"; Transliteration: "Kiteki Ga Kikoe Tara" (Japanese: 汽笛がきこえたら)	29 June 2008
27	"I Want You To Receive It"; Transliteration: "Anata Ni Todoketai" (Japanese: あなたに届けたい)	29 June 2008
28	"Sicilian Rhapsody"; Transliteration: "Shishirian Rapusodi" (Japanese: シシリアン・ラプソディ)	13 July 2008
29	"The Letter"; Transliteration: "Tegami" (Japanese: 手紙)	20 July 2008
30	"The Roman Signpost"; Transliteration: "Rooma No Michishirube" (Japanese: ローマの道しるべ)	27 July 2008
31	"Somewhere In The City"; Transliteration: "Kono Machi No Doko Ka Ni" (Japanese: この街のどこかに)	3 August 2008
32	"Mina and Isabella"; Transliteration: "Miina To Izabera" (Japanese: ミーナとイザベラ)	10 August 2008
33	"Young Men Covered With Wounds"; Transliteration: "Kizudarake no Shounen-tachi" (Japanese: 傷だらけの少年たち)	17 August 2008
34	"A Present To An Angel"; Transliteration: "Tenshi e No Purezento" (Japanese: 天使へのプレゼント)	24 August 2008
35	"The Believing Heart"; Transliteration: "Shinjiru Kokoro" (Japanese: 信じるこころ)	31 August 2008
36	"The Mask Of Honesty"; Transliteration: "Kamen No Sugao" (Japanese: 仮面の素顔)	7 September 2008
37	"The Scenery That They See"; Transliteration: "Futaride Miru Keshiki" (Japanese: ふたりで見る景色)	14 September 2008
38	"Scattering In The Wind"; Transliteration: "Kaze Ni Chiru" (Japanese: 風に散る)	21 September 2008
39	"The Road That Leads To You"; Transliteration: "Kimi e to Tsuzuku Michi" (Japanese: 君へと続く道)	28 September 2008
40	"Aiming For The Border"; Transliteration: "Kokkyou o Mezashite" (Japanese: 国境を目指して)	5 October 2008
41	"The Family in Southern France"; Transliteration: "Minami Furansu no Kazoku" (Japanese: 南フランスの家族)	12 October 2008
42	"Love Taken Away"; Transliteration: "Ubawareta Ai" (Japanese: 奪われた愛)	19 October 2008
43	"Friends"; Transliteration: "Tomo Yo" (Japanese: 友よ)	26 October 2008
44	"Gaining Courage"; Transliteration: "Yuuki o ageru" (Japanese: 勇気をあげる)	2 November 2008
45	"The Rose Blooming In The Alley"; Transliteration: "Rojiura ni Saku Bara" (Japanese: 路地裏に咲く薔薇)	10 November 2008
46	"The Chance Meeting In Paris"; Transliteration: "Pari No meguriai" (Japanese: パリのめぐり逢い)	16 November 2008
47	"The New Door"; Transliteration: "Atarashii Tobira" (Japanese: 新しい扉)	23 November 2008
48	"The Fragment Of A Dream"; Transliteration: "Yume No kakera" (Japanese: 夢のかけら)	30 November 2008
49	"Rendezvous"; Transliteration: "Randebuu" (Japanese: ランデブー)	7 December 2008
50	"A Lie"; Transliteration: "Uso" (Japanese: うそ)	14 December 2008
51	"The Wish"; Transliteration: "Negai" (Japanese: 願い)	21 December 2008
52	"For This Moment"; Transliteration: "Kono Shunkan Notameni" (Japanese: この瞬間のために)	28 December 2008
