= Tsuneo Kobayashi =

Japanese anime director (1965 –2015)

- Born: 1965; Kanagawa Prefecture, Japan
- Died: May 2015
- Occupation: Anime director
- Known for: The Twelve Kingdoms

Tsuneo Kobayashi (小林常夫, Kobayashi Tsuneo; born 1965 – May 2015) was a Japanese anime director affiliated with Pierrot. He was best known as the director of critically acclaimed anime series The Twelve Kingdoms.

== Filmography ==
As director (incomplete list):

- Glass Mask (1998-1999)
- Super GALS! Kotobuki Ran (2001-2002)
- The Twelve Kingdoms (2002-2003)
- Midori Days (2004)
- Victorian Romance Emma (2005-2007)
- Kurokami (2009)
- The Last: Naruto the Movie (2014)
