= Twilight Q =

1987 original video animation

- DVD cover (Region 2)

トワイライトQ (Towairaito Kyū)
- Created by: Headgear
- Original video animation

Time Knot: Reflection
- Directed by: Tomomi Mochizuki
- Written by: Kazunori Itō
- Studio: Ajiado
- Licensed by: Network Frontier
- Released: February 28, 1987
- Runtime: 30 minutes
- Original video animation

Mystery Article: File 538
- Directed by: Mamoru Oshii
- Studio: Studio Deen
- Licensed by: Network Frontier
- Released: August 28, 1987
- Runtime: 30 minutes
- icon

Twilight Q (トワイライトQ, Towairaito Kyū) is a Japanese original video animation series released in Japan in 1987 by Network Frontier (now Bandai Namco Arts). The series is similar to The Twilight Zone.

== Story ==
The first part, Time Knot: Reflection (時の結び目 Reflection, Toki no Musubime Rifurekushon), has two girls at a beach where one of them finds an old camera. She develops the film and finds that she is in a photo, arm-in-arm with a young man, despite not remembering the picture being taken. She then finds out the camera is a model that has not yet been released.

The second part, Mystery Article: File 538 (迷宮物件 File538, Meikyū Bukken Fairu Go San Hachi), follows a detective investigating the mysterious disappearances of airplanes, and his investigation into a father and daughter.

== Cast ==
=== Part 1 ===
- Mayumi: Mako Hyōdō
- Kiwako: Miina Tominaga
- Uemura: Masahiro Anzai
- Hirata: Yasuyuki Hirata
- Dad: Natsuo Tokuhiro
- Mom: Kumiko Takizawa
- Teacher: Rokurō Naya

=== Part 2 ===
- Man: Tetsuya Kaji
- Young Girl: Mako Hyōdō
- Radio Announcer: Shigeru Chiba
