= Yokohama Kaidashi Kikou =

Japanese manga series

- First tankōbon volume cover, featuring Alpha Hatsuseno

ヨコハマ買い出し紀行
- Genre: Iyashikei; Science fiction
- Manga
- Written by: Hitoshi Ashinano
- Published by: Kodansha
- English publisher: NA: Seven Seas Entertainment
- Imprint: Afternoon KC
- Magazine: Monthly Afternoon
- Original run: 25 April 1994 – 25 February 2006
- Volumes: 14
- Original video animation
- Directed by: Takashi Annō
- Produced by: Ryūji Katō; Seiji Suzuki; Masahiro Okamura
- Music by: Gontiti
- Studio: Ajia-do Animation Works
- Released: 21 May 1998 – 2 December 1998
- Runtime: 28 minutes each
- Episodes: 2
- Original video animation

Quiet Country Cafe
- Directed by: Tomomi Mochizuki
- Produced by: Naomi Sudō
- Written by: Tomomi Mochizuki
- Music by: Choro Club
- Studio: Ajia-do Animation Works
- Released: 18 December 2002 – 5 March 2003
- Runtime: 32 minutes each
- Episodes: 2
- icon

Yokohama Kaidashi Kikou (Japanese: ヨコハマ買い出し紀行; lit. 'Yokohama Shopping Log') is a Japanese manga series written and illustrated by Hitoshi Ashinano. It was serialized in Kodansha's seinen manga magazine Monthly Afternoon from April 1994 to February 2006, with a concluding postscript episode in May 2006, and collected in 14 tankōbon volumes. Parts of the story were adapted as two original video animation (OVA) anime series of two episodes each, where the latter one is titled Quiet Country Cafe.

The series depicts the daily life of an android who runs a coffee shop sometime after the Earth's ecology has collapsed. It is noted for its sparse pen-and-ink drawing style, as well as its calm, meticulously paced stories and engaging characters. Yokohama Kaidashi Kikou won the 2007 Seiun Award for best science-fiction comic.

== Plot ==
Yokohama Kaidashi Kikou is set in a peaceful, post-cataclysmic world where mankind is in decline after an environmental disaster. Exactly what happened is never explained, but sea levels have risen significantly, inundating coastal cities such as Yokohama, Mount Fuji erupted in living memory; and climate change has occurred. With the seasons being less pronounced, the winters are milder and the summer isn't scorching anymore. The reduced human population has reverted to a simpler life, and the reader is told this is the twilight of the human age. One scene depicts an anti-aircraft missile being used in a firework display. Instead of raging against their fate, humans have quietly accepted it.

Alpha Hatsuseno is an android ("robot person") who runs an out-of-the-way coffee shop, Café Alpha, on the lonely coast of the Miura Peninsula of Japan, while her human "owner" is on a trip of indefinite length. Though she spends much of her time alone, Alpha is cheerful, gregarious, and—unlike the slowly declining humans—immortal.

Most chapters of Yokohama Kaidashi Kikou are self-contained slice-of-life episodes depicting Alpha in daily activities, either alone, with customers, or on occasional trips through the countryside or into Yokohama for supplies (whence the "shopping log" of the title came). Whole chapters are devoted to brewing coffee, taking photographs, or repairing a tiny model aircraft engine, sometimes with only a few lines of dialogue. Through Alpha's experiences, the author brings out the small wonders of everyday life and makes the reader aware of their passing: the aircraft engine runs out of fuel; her scooter breaks down; the rising ocean encroaches on her coffee shop; the neighborhood children she loves grow up and move away. In evoking a nostalgia for this loss, Ashinano follows the Japanese tradition of mono no aware (sadness for the transience of things).

Though often self-contained, the stories have continuity—relationships grow and change, and seemingly insignificant details reappear later. Ashinano explains few details of Alpha's world, leaving mysteries that engage the reader as the series unfolds in a meandering progression, by turns funny, touching, and nostalgic.

== Characters ==
Alpha (left) and Kokone (right) from a color page of the manga

Alpha Hatsuseno (初瀬野 アルファ, Hatsuseno Arufa)
Voiced by: Hekiru Shiina
A type A7M2 robot, one of only three production prototypes, who runs Café Alpha in the absence of her owner (whose family name is Hatsuseno). Alpha is cheerful and thoughtful. She enjoys talking with her few customers, but is initially socially awkward and sheltered—despite being her model's prototype, at the start of the series she has met only a few people and no other robots. Because of this, when her owner departed, she declined to travel with him. As the series progresses, however, she grows more confident in her social skills, enough so that she spends a year traveling herself, and becomes more attached to her human friends even as they age and depart. Alpha is not very experienced about human behavior or appearances; she uses dishwasher liquid instead of brushing her teeth and doesn't think of her eye or hair color as strange. One of her unique abilities is that she is, according to her emotions, able to induce tears in her eye moisturizers. In her spare time, Alpha plays a gekkin, carves small art objects with fish designs, and travels the local countryside on her scooter, investigating the remains of humanity's previous age and the emerging world to come.
Kokone Takatsu (鷹津 ココネ, Takatsu Kokone; sometimes romanized as "Cocone")
Voiced by: Akiko Nakagawa
A type A7M3 production robot who works as a courier in what remains of Musashino, Tokyo. She is the first robot that Alpha meets, when she delivers a package (containing a camera) and a message from Alpha's owner. They soon become friends. Kokone is sweet, shy, and somewhat intellectual, but because of her job she has more experience with people than Alpha, and can sometimes pass for human. After meeting Alpha, her "older sister" production-wise, Kokone becomes curious about the history and nature of robots. Unlike Alpha, she is able to process animal protein.
Ojisan (おじさん, Ojisan; 'Uncle')
Voiced by: Mikio Terashima, Shōzō Iizuka (Quiet Country Cafe)
A middle-aged man with a perpetual grin, he is Alpha's closest neighbor and a regular customer at her café. He runs a gas station and sells vegetables on the side. He is a grandfather-figure to Alpha and the actual grandfather of Takahiro. Ojisan refers to himself as a bum, and seems to regret not pursuing a relationship with Sensei when they were younger. His real name is never given.
Takahiro (タカヒロ)
Voiced by: Akio Suyama, Toshiyuki Toyonaga (Quiet Country Cafe)
The grandson of Ojisan, who lives with his grandparents. He meets Alpha at age nine, and she quickly takes to him as if he were a younger brother. He is the first character in the series to meet the Misago. As he grows up, Takahiro becomes fascinated with engines of all types and eventually moves away in his mid-teens to work for Nai.
Matsuki (真月; usually called "Makki")
Voiced by: Miki Nagasawa
A girl a few years younger than Takahiro. She likes Takahiro and is initially jealous of Alpha. Makki eventually becomes close to Alpha after learning the latter would never consider having a relationship with Takahiro because mortal humans move through time in a different way than immortal robots. She is skeptical of Takahiro's stories of the Misago until she meets the wild-woman herself. In her early teens, Makki works for a while at Alpha's café, before moving away to become a courier with Kokone's company, and then later to Hamamatsu to be with Takahiro.
Saetta (サエッタ)
The young daughter of Makki and Takahiro. She is the last character to meet the Misago.
Dr. Koumi'ishi (子海石先生, Koumi'ishi-sensei)
Voiced by: Ikuko Sugita
An older woman, she is a doctor for both humans and androids. She was involved in the creation of the A7 series of robots, and hosted Director Alpha in her home, possibly as Director Alpha's owner. When she was younger, she rode motorcycles and raced hovercraft and was Ojisan's senpai from school. She is always addressed by just her title. She tells Kokone that she is also involved in creation of Misago.
Misago (ミサゴ; 'Osprey')
An ageless wild-woman who lives in the inlets and bays near Café Alpha. She is always naked, and eats raw fish, crabs, and insects caught using her short fangs and inhuman speed, which enables her to run on water and easily jump 10 metres high. She only shows herself to young children, and shies away from contact with adults. She does not age and, according to omake material, does not understand how children grow up. While Ayase claims she existed "decades before" robots were created, it is later implied by Doctor that she is the first robot. Despite Misago's feral nature, she is a gentle person, and does not cause harm to anyone beyond accidentally scaring some of the children she encounters.
Ayase (アヤセ)
Voiced by: Toshiyuki Morikawa
A wanderer who travels endlessly, relying on his kamas (a large predatory flying fish) to live off the land. He likes to see the curiosities of the world and is especially fascinated by the Misago after an encounter with her as a child. Because of Makki's affinity for the Misago and his kamas, he tries to convince her to travel with him as a sort of protégé.
Alpha Koumi'ishi (子海石 アルファ, Koumi'ishi Alpha)
The A7M1 prototype of the A7 series and thus the "older sister" to the other A7 robots. Like Alpha Hatsuseno, Director Alpha acquired her given name because she is the initial model, or "alpha-type", of a robot series. She is the director of a stratospheric aircraft called Taapon that circles the Earth without landing, observing the world's changes from above without ever being able to leave. She has a pendant with Dr. Koumi'ishi's logo, indicating a past with her that is never elaborated on, and she never interacts with any of the other major characters.
Maruko Maruco (丸子 マルコ, Maruko Maruko)
A type A7M3 robot with a prickly personality. She is an artist who lives in Yokohama and works as a waitress and then shop clerk as a day job. She is unusual among robots for having changed her surname to one of her own choosing rather than adopting her owner's. Her given name is pronounced the same as her surname but spelled in katakana. She likes Kokone and is jealous of Alpha for "taking" her. Nai sometimes sends her sensory impressions, delivered by Kokone, which she uses in her art.
Nai (ナイ)
Voiced by: Ryō Naitō
An A7 robot of unknown model. He is unusual because, for unknown reasons, the majority of male robots rarely survive for very long after activation. He runs a delivery service, flying an AT-6 Texan aircraft. Nai is quiet and impassive.

== Influences and themes ==
Flying and flight recur through the series. Alpha herself has repeated visions of flying. Planes that appear include Nai's airplane, the always-flying Taapon, and the model airplane engine that Alpha finds but never flies. The A7 series of robots is named after a Japanese World War II warplane Mitsubishi A7M that never saw production, and the character Saetta's name may be inspired by an Italian World War II warplane built by Aeronautica Macchi. Takahiro leaves ("flies away") to work for Nai. Ayase's kamas is a kind of flying fish. In the postscript episode, the unnamed character travels by glider.

The series contains elements of Chinese culture and mythology. Alpha's gekkin guitar is of Chinese origin, and the Taapon aircraft is named after the mythological bird Peng (taapon is the Japanese transliteration of da peng).

Some character names appear in the geography of the Yokohama area. For example, there is a bus stop named Koumi'ishi to the south of Hayama, and Atsugi airfield, where Alpha meets Nai, is located in Ayase. There is a place called Maruko in Yokohama where Maruko's gallery is supposed to be.

Map of the setting of Yokohama Kaidashi Kikou, showing how the coastline of the Miura Peninsula has changed

That several details of Yokohama Kaidashi Kikou are left unexplained, or have answers only hinted at, is frequently mentioned in reviews of the series as contributing to a tone of mystery. Some are mysteries to the characters, which they speculate about without reaching conclusions, while others are presented to the reader without comment. Among the most prominent are:

- What is the nature of the natural disaster that caused the world's oceans to rise?
- Who is Alpha's owner, and where did he go? Why does Ayase call him "sensei"?
- Why were robots created? Since none are slaves or servants, what is their purpose? In what sense are they, as Kokone claims, humanity's children?
- Why are the humans in Alpha's world dying out?
- Why are male robots so rare?
- Why is Alpha, unlike other robots, allergic to animal proteins?
- What are the "water gods", strangely beautiful mushrooms with human faces, that have started growing in the wilds?
- Why have trees that mimic streetlamps and fungi that mimic buildings begun growing? Are they really, as Alpha and Ayase speculate, the "recollections of people that the earth remembers"?
- When was the eruption that removed Mount Fuji's top, and was it related to the ocean rise?
- What is the Misago? Why does she only show herself to children, and why is she unable to comprehend that they become adults? If, as Ayase claims, she is not a robot, then what is she?

Comparisons have been made between Yokohama Kaidashi Kikou and Aria, noting that they are both quiet slice-of-life stories in a futuristic setting with a similar emotional effect. A reviewer at Uknighted Manganime wrote, "What the two have in common, though, is a bright look at the future and a generally optimistic view of humanity, despite our failings."

== Media ==
=== Manga ===
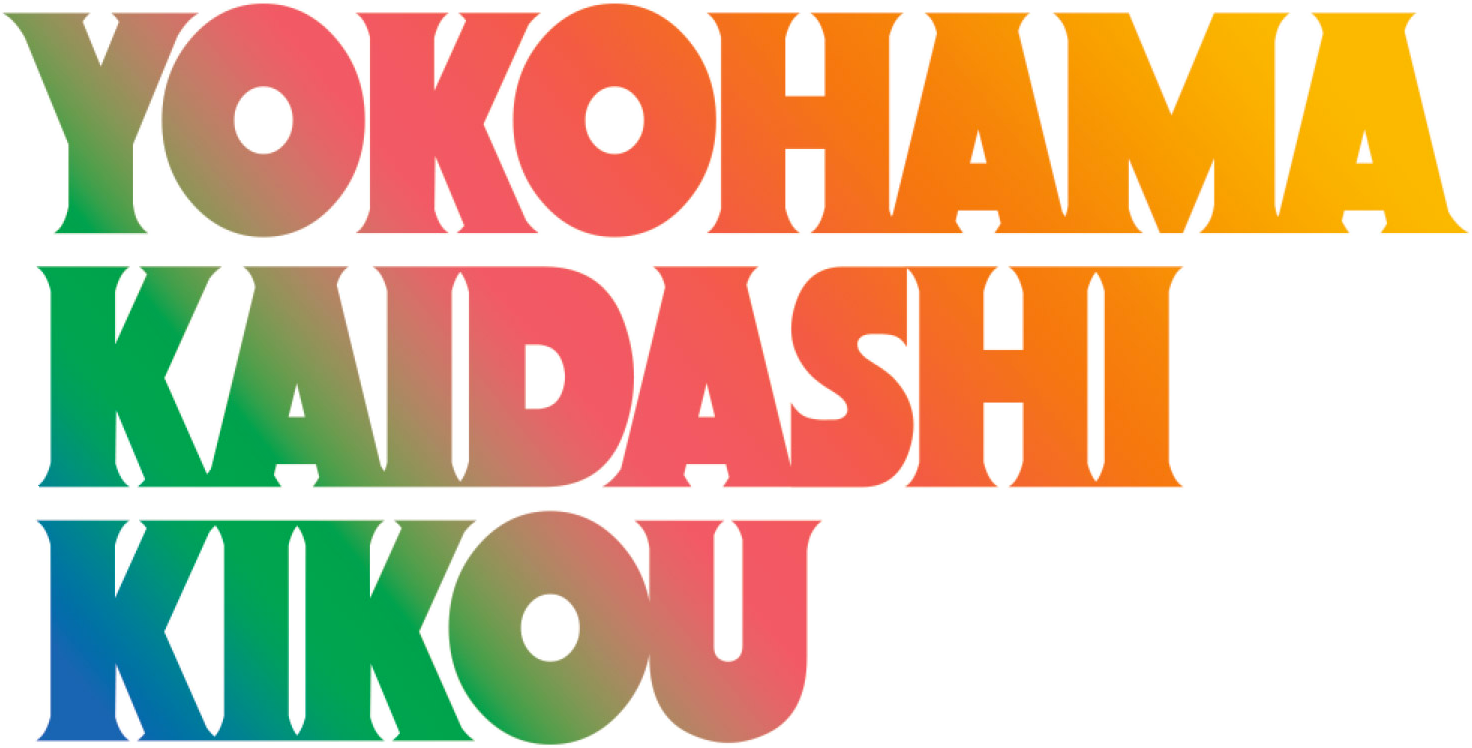
Yokohama Kaidashi Kikou - Title Logo

Written and illustrated by Hitoshi Ashinano, Yokohama Kaidashi Kikou began as a one-shot published in Kodansha's seinen manga magazine Monthly Afternoon on 25 April 1994, (Note: Published in the magazine's June 1994 issue, released on 25 April of that same year.) after it won the Shiki Prize of the Spring 1994 Afternoon Shiki Shō. It became a full series, which was serialized in Monthly Afternoon from 25 July 1994, (Note: Debuted in the magazine's September 1994 issue, released on 25 July of that same year.) to 25 February 2006, (Note: Finished in the magazine's April 2006 issue, released on 25 February 2006.) for a total of 140 chapters. The one-shot and the serialized chapters were collected in 14 tankōbon volumes by Kodansha under the Afternoon KC imprint, published from 23 August 1995, to 23 May 2006. Kodansha later reprinted the series in ten shinsōban volumes from 23 October 2009, to 7 July 2010. It is licensed in Korea under the title 카페 알파 (Café Alpha), in Indonesia by M&C Comics, in Taiwan by Tong Li Publishing, in France by Meian under the title Escale à Yokohama, and in North America by Seven Seas Entertainment.

==== Volumes ====
No.	Release date	ISBN
1	23 August 1995	978-4-06-321050-7
Prologue: "Yokohama Bean-Shopping Trip" (ヨコハマ買い出し紀行, Yokohama Kaidashi Kikō); 1. "Steel-Scented Night" (鋼の香る夜, Hagane no Kaoru Yoru); 2. "The Osprey of the Bay" (入江のミサゴ, Irie no Misago); 3. "Rumbling Stripes" (しましまのごろごろ, Shimashima no Gorogoro); 4. "Rain and After" (雨とその後, Ame to Sonogo); 5. "Endless Neighborhood Association Meeting" (エンドレス町内会, Endoresu Chōnaikai); 6. "Lazy New Year's Pre-party" (プレ寝正月, Pure Neshōgatsu); 7. "2/2 a.m." (午前2/2, Gozen 2/2)
Alpha Hatsuseno is an android that runs a coffee shop in place of her missing master. She befriends an unnamed elderly man and his grandson, Takahiro. The chapters in this volume cover Alpha's daily life in an episodic fashion: Takahiro meets the Misago, Alpha attempts to give watermelons to her customers, Alpha is hit by lightning, Alpha attends a party, Alpha and Takahiro see the first sunrise of the new year, and Alpha befriends an android named Kokone Takatsu.
2	23 February 1996	978-4-06-321055-2
8. "1/1 p.m." (午後1/1, Gogo 1/1); 9. "300 Pictures per Piece" (ひと粒300枚, Hitotsubu 300-mai); 10. "Ayase of the Barracuda" (カマスのアヤセ, Kamasu no Ayase); 11. "Protein" (プロテイン, Purotein); 12. "Your Guide" (ナビ, Nabi); 13. "Kamakura Fireworks" (鎌倉花火, Kamakura Hanabi); 14. "Sandy Beach" (砂の浜, Suna no Hama); 15. "Sandy Road" (砂の道, Suna no Michi)
Kokone delivers a message from Alpha's master who gives her permission to explore the world and a camera. Continuing episodically: Takahiro befriends a wanderer named Ayase, Alpha tries to ingest animal protein per Kokone's suggestion and becomes sick, Alpha decides to try and take a good picture with her camera, Alpha and friends watch a firework display, Alpha finds a glass bottle at a beach, Takahiro's grandfather reminisces about the past when he watched a beach sink a city.
3	23 July 1996	978-4-06-321061-3
16. "Apron" (エプロン, Epuron); 17. "Waves" (波, Nami); 18. "Musashino, the Old Capital" (古都ムサシノ, Koto Musashino); 19. "Okazure in the North" (北の大崩れ, Kita no Ōkuzure); 20. "Great Bird" (鵬 (HOH), Hō); 21. "Water God" (水神さま, Suijin-sama); 22. "Yokosuka Cruise" (ヨコスカ巡航, Yokosuka Junkō); 23. "The People of Late" (今の人, Ima no Hito)
Kokone has begun to act more human due to her friendship with Alpha. In this volume: Kokone visits Alpha and sleeps over for the night, Alpha runs into Ayase and befriends him, Alpha watches the drowned city light up at night, and the Misago searches for Takahiro.
4	21 March 1997	978-4-06-321066-8
24. "Kids These Days" (日々のお子達, Hibi no o Kotachi); 25. "Distant Summer Vacation" (遠い夏休み, Tōi Natsuyasumi); 26. "M1 of Blue" (青のM1, Ao no M1); 27. "Asashina Pass" (朝比奈峠, Asahina Tōge); 28. "Bonds of Fate" (縁, Yukari); 29. "Sunlight" (ひなた, Hinata); 30. "Cafe Alpha" (カフェ アルファ, Kafe Arufa); 31. "Red Water" (赤い水, Akai Mizu)
In this volume: Takahiro befriends Kokone; Alpha and Kokone swim at the beach; Alpha's predecessor, Alpha Koumi'ishi, watches the world below from her plane; Dr. Koumi'ishi contemplates on her past and her creations, the Alpha androids; Takahiro spends the day with Matsuki; a customer visits Alpha's coffee shop and shares their thoughts; and Takahiro helps Alpha fix the water to her shop.
5	23 February 1998	978-4-06-321081-1
32. "Mount Fuji" (富士山, Fujisan); 33. "Yokohama Bean-Shopping" (横浜買い出し, Yokohama Kaidashi); 34. "Customer" (お客さま, Okyaku-sama); 35. "The Smell of Night" (夜のにおい, Yoru no Nioi); 36. "The Smell of Town" (町のにおい, Machi no Nioi); 37. "Early in the Morning" (朝早く, Asa Hayaku); 38. "Ocean River" (海の河, Umi no Kawa); 39. "Afternoon Barley Tea" (午後の麦茶, Gogo no Mugicha); 40. "Tsukuyomi" (月夜見); 41. "Single Lens" (一眼, Ichigan); 42. "Spring Dragonfly" (ハルトンボ, Haru Tonbo)
Alpha heads to the city for some shopping and decides to visit Kokone. After returning home, Dr. Koumi'ishi asks Alpha to pilot her old boat; while piloting, Alpha discovers she can astral project her soul. The last stories are episodic: Matsuki meets the Misago while playing with Takahiro, one of Ayase's travels is covered, Alpha expresses her thoughts about pictures from her camera, and Alpha procrastinates cleaning the café.
6	22 February 1999	978-4-06-321095-8
43. "Dancing Alone" (ひとりおどり, Hitori Odori); 44. "Planet's Eyes, People's Eyes" (星の目 人の目, Hoshi no Me, Hito no Me); 45. "Their Ship" (みんなの船, Minna no Fune); 46. "Record" (レコード, Rekōdo); 47. "Record II" (レコード・II, Rekōdo II); 48. "Record III" (レコード・III, Rekōdo III); 49. "Sure is Hot" (あついすな, Atsui Suna); 50. "Water Clock" (水の時計, Mizu no Tokei); 51. "Hole in the Hill" (やまのあな, Yama no Ana); 52. "Night Bird"; 53. "The Doctor's Logo" (先生のマーク, Sensei no Māku); 54. "Musashino Dispatch" (武蔵野通信, Musashino Tsūshin)
In this volume: Alpha Koumi'ishi expresses her opinions about the current state of the world, Alpha befriends Matsuki, Kokone finds an LP record and decides to seek out a Gramophone to play it, Alpha takes Takahiro and Matsuki to the beach, Takahiro expresses melancholy since the Misago no longer wishes to see him since he is no longer a child, Ayase travels through a dark tunnel, Kokone sends Alpha alcoholic coffee to mix with milk, Dr. Koumi'ishi reminisces about her past, Alpha sends a gratitude letter to Kokone and receives more alcoholic coffee in return.
7	23 February 2000	978-4-06-321110-8
55. "White in the Air" (中空の白, Chūkū no Shiro); 56. "White Morning" (白い朝, Shiroi Asa); 57. "White Paint" (白ペンキ, Shiro Penki); 58. "Two Drops of Deep Blue" (藍の粒ふたつ, Ai no Tsubu Futatsu); 59. "Eye of Deep Blue" (藍色の瞳, Aīro no Hitomi); 60. "Blue Clothes" (青い服, Aoi Fuku); 61. "Crimson Mountain" (紅の山, Beni no Yama); 62. "Typhoon" (颱風, Taifū); 63. "My Place" (私の場所, Watashi no basho); 64. "Letter" (手紙, Tegami); 65. "On the Bank" (岸, Kishi)
Episodically, in this volume: Takahiro witnesses Alpha's astral projection, Takahiro spends the night at Alpha's, Alpha contemplates on her missing master and how loneliness would be unbearable if not for her friends, Alpha talks with Dr. Koumi'ishi while Alpha Koumi'ishi reminisces about her creator's gift, Alpha falls into a hole and searches for her camera, and Kokone's friend, Maruko, attempts to sneak up on Kokone to scare her. Later, a typhoon destroys the café, so Alpha decides to explore the world.
8	22 February 2001	978-4-06-321120-7
66. "Persimmon" (柿, Kaki); 67. "Port" (港, Minato); 68. "Airplane" (飛行機, Hikōki); 69. "Bonfire" (焚火, Takibi); 70. "Water" (水, Mizu); 71. "Valley Road" (谷の道, Tani no Michi); 72. "Cowpeas" (ササゲ, Sasage); 73. "Chocolate Cake" (チョコレートケーキ, Chokorēto Kēki); 74. "Membrane" (網膜, Mōmaku); 75. "Wildfire" (野火, Nobi); 76. "Chestnut" (栗, Kuri)
Episodically in this volume: Alpha travels through a rural journey and is relieved to find an inn, she ends up an airport and befriends a male android named Nai, Nai flies Alpha on his plane where Alpha uses her astral projection to fly alongside him, Alpha continues her journey and travels down a road that lights up at night, a teenage Takahiro and Matsuki spend the day together, Alpha works at a food stand near Mount Fuji, Maruko receives a telegram of Nai depicting Alpha, and, Alpha finds a stranger and eats roasted chestnuts with him.
9	23 March 2002	978-4-06-321134-4
77. "Salt" (塩, Shio); 78. "Purple Eyes" (むらさきの瞳, Murasaki no Hitomi); 79. "Night of Soil" (土の夜, Tsuchi no Yoru); 80. "Weatherfish" (風見魚, Kazamigyo); 81. "One-Year Gap" (一年空間, Ichi Nen Kūkan); 82. "Black Pine Street" (クロマツ通り, Kuromatsu-dōri); 83. "Blue Notes" (青い音, Aoi Oto); 84. "Seventy above Sea Level" (海抜70, Kaibatsu 70); 85. "Frog" (かえる, Kaeru); 86. "Congratulatory Yeah" (おつかれのイエー, O Tsukare no Iē); 87. "Denizens of the Bay" (入江の者たち, Irie no Monotachi); 88. "Southern Flying Barracuda" (ミナミトビカマス, Minamitobi Kamasu)
Alpha wanders onto a field of geysers before reaching her hometown. Resuming her life in an episodic manner: Alpha relaxes at home, she adds a wind flag to the café and reacquaints with Takahiro's grandfather, Kokone discusses the Alpha androids with Dr. Koumi'ishi, Alpha and Kokone later spend time together, Alpha begins rebuilding the café and contemplates during a rainy day, and later contemplates during a summer day, Matsuki meets Ayase and becomes familiar with his pet kama.
10	20 March 2003	978-4-06-321147-4
89. "Before Winter" (冬の前, Fuyu no Mae); 90. "In the Winter" (冬の中, Fuyu no Naka); 91. "The End of Winter" (冬のおわり, Fuyu no Owari); 92. "Maruco Tea" (マルコ茶, Maruko Cha); 93. "The Flowers of People" (人の花, Hito no Hana); 94. "Echo"; 95. "Green" (緑, Midori); 96. "People Sleeping" (眠る人, Nemuru Hito); 97. "Blinding Yellow" (目にしみる黄, Me ni Shimiru Ki); 98. "Those Who Fly" (飛ぶ者, Tobu Mono); 99. "The Earth's Surface" (地表, Chihyō)
Alpha has finished rebuilding her café. Episodically: Alpha invites Takahiro to see Nai's plane, experiences snow for the first time, and befriends Maruko; Kokone's friend turns the LP record into a cassette, Alpha Koumi'ishi considers visiting the surface, Alpha plays with a gun and grows a giant sunflower, Ayase invites Matsuki to journey with him to learn about kamas, and Ayase visits Alpha and tells her a ghost story.
11	23 March 2004	978-4-06-321159-7
100. "Together" (ふたり, Futari); 101. "Two for the Opening" (開店の二杯, Kaiten no Ni Hai); 102. "A7M3 Maruko Maruco" (A7M3丸子マルコ, A7M3 Maruko Maruko); 103. "Cliff Water" (崖の水, Gake no Mizu); 104. "Migration" (渡り, Watari); 105. "Superblack" (超黒, Chō kuro); 106. "Road, Town, Resident" (道と町と住人, Michi to Machi to Jūnin); 107. "Regular" (常連さん, Jōren-san); 108. "Drops" (しずく, Shizuku); 109. "The Kid by the Sea" (潮端の子, Shonbata no Ko); 110. "Their Boat" (ふたりの船, Futari no Fune)
Episodically: Kokone and Maruko visit Alpha, Alpha searches for quality water to make coffee, Alpha Koumi'ishi contemplates melancholy as her plane prepares to leave to the other side of earth for six years, Alpha receives brown sugar and takes a liking to it, Ayase thinks about how he world was before being taken over by nature, Maruko visits Alpha again, Alpha adds a viewing window to the café, an adult Takahiro decides to leave town to pursue his dreams, Matsuki and Takahiro spend time together at the beach, Alpha's scooter breaks down while on a trip.
12	22 November 2004	978-4-06-321165-8
111. "Plug" (プラグ, Puragu); 112. "Musashino Plain" (武蔵野原, Musashino Hara); 113. "Fish" (さかな, Sakana); 114. "Miniature Garden" (はこにわ, Hakoniwa); 115. "First Sunrise" (初日の出, Hatsuhinode); 116. "Under the Pine Tree" (松の木の下, Matsunoki no Shita); 117. "Altitude 1m" (高度1m, Kōdo 1m); 118. "In Town" (町で, Machi de); 119. "Soba Zenzai" (ソバゼンザイ); 120. "Voice" (声, Koe)
Episodically: Alpha has a dream about her master, Takahiro starts working under Nai, Alpha and Matsuki watch the first sunrise of the new year, Takahiro's grandfather and Dr. Koumi'ishi talk about their loneliness, Alpha teaches Matsuki how to ride a scooter, Alpha visits Maruko in the city, Alpha expresses sadness on how short human life is, Alpha revisits the sunken city and Kokone and her friend discuss men.
13	22 July 2005	978-4-06-321171-9
121. "Fifty Kilometers, Six Hours" (50km、6時, 50km, 6-ji); 122. "Watermelon Day" (スイカの日, Suika no Hi); 123. "End of Summer" (夏の終わりに, Natsu no Owari ni); 124. "Heartbeat" (鼓動, Kodō); 125. "The Wind on Your Face" (顔にあたる空気, Kao Niataru Kūki); 126. "Big Sisters" (おねえさん, Onee-san); 127. "Drops" (滴, Shizuku); 128. "Planet of Gazes" (視線の星, Shisen no Hoshi); 129. "Solo"; 130. "Moon Rings" (月の輪, Tsukinowa)
Episodically: Takahiro's grandfather tells Alpha to live in his house once he dies, Matsuki rejects Ayase's offer to travel with him, Alpha starts up an old motor and contemplates about her life, Alpha goes to a field and astra projects, Kokone visits Alpha and befriends Matsuki, Ayase contemplates while looking at the sunken city, Kokone upgrades her scooter, Alpha and Takahiro's grandfather discuss how things changed over the six years they've known each other. Continuing after a timeskip: Matsuki returns to visit Alpha, Dr. Koumi'ishi gives Alpha her pendant; Alpha, Kokone, Matsuki, and Maruko go to the beach and Alpha Koumi'ishi contemplates on when she can return to the Earth's surface.
14	23 May 2006	978-4-06-321176-4
131. "Air"; 132. "One Who Happily Wanders and Looks" (見て、歩き、よろこぶ者, Mite, Aruki, Yorokobu Mono); 133. "Beach Crowd" (海の衆, Umi no Shū); 134. "Radio" (ラジオ, Rajio); 135. "Café Alpha"; 136. "Takatsu Kokone" (鷹津ココネ); 137. "Their Ship" (みんなのふね, Minna no Fune); 138. "People Waking" (目覚める人, Mezameru Hito); 139. "Twilight Dispatch" (夕凪通信, Yūnagi Tsūshin); 140. "The Final Chapter: Yokohama Bean-Shopping Trip" (最終回 ヨコハマ買い出し紀行, Saishūkai: Yokohama Kaidashi Kikō)
Kokone has a final talk with her friend who is relocating. A second time skip, Matsuki sends a letter detailing her life to Alpha. A third time skip, Matsuki became engaged to Takahiro and visits Alpha with her daughter. An unknown amount of time passes, Alpha monologues she will never forget her friends and the memories they shared.

==== Shinsōban volumes ====
No.	Original release date	Original ISBN	English release date	English ISBN
1	23 October 2009	978-4-06-314588-5	2 August 2022 (digital); 9 August 2022 (print)	978-1-68579-791-1 (digital); 978-1-63858-544-2 (print)
2	23 October 2009	978-4-06-314589-2	2 August 2022 (digital); 9 August 2022 (print)	978-1-68579-791-1 (digital); 978-1-63858-544-2 (print)
3	20 November 2009	978-4-06-314593-9	23 May 2023	979-8-88843-697-4 (digital); 978-1-63858-545-9 (print)
4	22 December 2009	978-4-06-310615-2	23 May 2023	979-8-88843-697-4 (digital); 978-1-63858-545-9 (print)
5	22 January 2010	978-4-06-310618-3	8 August 2023	979-8-88843-942-5 (digital); 978-1-63858-546-6 (print)
6	23 February 2010	978-4-06-310630-5	8 August 2023	979-8-88843-942-5 (digital); 978-1-63858-546-6 (print)
7	23 March 2010	978-4-06-310644-2	20 February 2024 (digital); 27 February 2024 (print)	979-8-89160-712-5 (digital); 978-1-63858-547-3 (print)
8	23 April 2010	978-4-06-310656-5	20 February 2024 (digital); 27 February 2024 (print)	979-8-89160-712-5 (digital); 978-1-63858-547-3 (print)
9	21 May 2010	978-4-06-310661-9	6 August 2024	979-8-89373-501-7 (digital); 978-1-63858-548-0 (print)
10	7 July 2010	978-4-06-310671-8	6 August 2024	979-8-89373-501-7 (digital); 978-1-63858-548-0 (print)

In addition, a six-page postscript episode, titled "Pass" (峠, Tōge), was published in the July 2006 issue of Monthly Afternoon, released in May of that year. This story does not have a chapter number and was not included in the original collection, though it is included in volume 10 of the re-release.

A postcard book (ISBN 978-4-06-330041-3) with art from the manga was published on 24 September 1997. An artbook (ISBN 978-4-06-330196-0) was published on 20 March 2003; it was digitally reissued on 21 December 2023.

=== Anime ===
Parts of the manga have been dramatized in two original video animation (OVA) anime series of two episodes each, where the latter one is titled Quiet Country Cafe. In both series, Alpha is voiced by Hekiru Shiina and Kokone by Akiko Nakagawa.

- The first OVA series, produced by Ajia-do Animation Works and directed by Takashi Annō, was released in May 1998 and December 1998 on VHS and Laserdisc. It dramatizes selected events from volumes 1–3, including the initial meeting of Alpha and Kokone and Alpha's recovery from being struck by lightning. It was rereleased on DVD.
- The second series, produced by Ajia-do Animation Works and SME Visual Works and directed by Tomomi Mochizuki, was released in December 2002 and May 2003 on VHS and DVD. It dramatizes selected events from volumes 7–9, including the storm that destroys Alpha's cafe and her subsequent journeys in central Japan.

A soundtrack CD for the second series was produced in 1998.

=== Drama CDs ===
Three drama CDs of Yokohama Kaidashi Kikou were released in 2002. In all three, Alpha is voiced by Hekiru Shiina and Kokone by Akiko Nakagawa.

- Volume 1 (released October 2002) dramatizes events from volume 1 of the manga, ending with the meeting of Alpha and Kokone.
- Volume 2 (released October 2002) dramatizes events from volume 2 of the manga, picking up immediately from where the first CD ended.
- Volume 3 (released December 2002) dramatizes events from later in the manga. It included an original song and an interview with Shiina and Nakagawa.

=== Novel ===
A novel based on Yokohama Kaidashi Kikou called Yokohama Kaidashi Kikou Novel: Seeing, Walking, Being Glad (小説 ヨコハマ買い出し紀行―見て、歩き、よろこぶ者), written by Teriha Katsuki (香月照葉, Katsuki Teriha) and illustrated by Hitoshi Ashinano, was published by Kodansha on 23 October 2008 (ISBN 978-4-06-373326-6). Set long after the conclusion of the manga series, it tells the story of a boy robot named Omega and his search for the legendary Cafe Alpha.

== Reception and awards ==
Even though it was not published in English until the second edition releases began in 2022, Yokohama Kaidashi Kikou has received significant attention from reviewers outside Japan. Many reviewers praise Ashinano's drawing style, meticulous pacing, and engaging characters. Dirk Deppey wrote in The Comics Journal, "Yokohama Kaidashi Kikou isn't just one of my favorite manga stories; it's one of my favorite comics, period." Derik A. Badman wrote, "This is light years beyond almost all the manga being translated and published in the US." A reviewer at Uknighted Manganime wrote, "Artwise, Yokohama Kaidashi Kikou ranks as the most impressive I have ever seen," adding, "Yokohama Kaidashi Kikou is, in short, the finest manga I have ever read, and I don't see it being surpassed anytime soon, if ever."

The series won the 2007 Seiun Award for Best Manga.
