= Kaneta Kimotsuki =

Japanese actor and theater director (1935–2016)

- 肝付 兼太
- Born: Kanemasa Kimotsuki (肝付 兼正); November 15, 1935; Kiire, Kagoshima Prefecture, Empire of Japan
- Died: October 20, 2016 (aged 80); Japan
- Other name: Liver-chan (肝ちゃん)
- Occupations: Actor; voice actor; theater director
- Years active: 1954–2016
- Agents: 21st Century FOX Theater Company (founder and director); 81 Produce (last affiliation)
- Notable credit(s): Doraemon as Suneo Honekawa; Galaxy Express 999 as Conductor; Osomatsu-kun as Iyami; Galaxy Express 999 as Conductor; Let's Go! Anpanman as Horrorman; Cyborg 009 as Sir Great Britain

Kaneta Kimotsuki (肝付 兼太, Kimotsuki Kaneta; born Kanemasa Kimotsuki (肝付 兼正, Kimotsuki Kanemasa); November 15, 1935 – October 20, 2016) was a Japanese actor, voice actor, and theater director. He was also the founder of the theater troupe 21st Century FOX and was affiliated with 81 Produce.

He was best known for the roles of Suneo Honekawa in Doraemon, Iyami in Osomatsu-kun, the Conductor in Galaxy Express 999, Horrorman in Let's Go! Anpanman, Takeshi "Gian" Gōda in Doraemon, Perman #4 (Hōzen Ōyama) in Perman, Kemuzō Kemumaki in Ninja Hattori-kun, Sir Great Britain in Cyborg 009, Jiminy Cricket in Pinocchio, Benzō Karino in Kiteretsu Encyclopedia, Quackerjack in Darkwing Duck, and Tom in Tom and Jerry.

== Biography ==
=== Early life ===
Kimotsuki was born on November 15, 1935, as a descendant of the Kimotsuki clan in Kiire, Kagoshima Prefecture, Empire of Japan (which later became Kiire Town, and is now Kiire Town, Kagoshima City).

He left Kagoshima at age three and lived in Nakano, Tokyo City, Tokyo Prefecture until he was four years old.

He then grew up in Itabashi, Tokyo. While he attended Itabashi Municipal Itabashi Fourth Elementary School, he and the other schoolchildren were evacuated to Yuhiso in Minakami Village, Tone District, Gunma Prefecture (later and now Minakami Town) due to war at the time. He was evacuated again to Ryūō Town in Ryūō Village, Nakakoma District, Yamanashi Prefecture (later Ryūō Town, now Kai City).

At the time, he was a quiet, timid child, so the scene of being tearfully separated from his parents while being put on a train was etched to his mind forever. From the first night he arrived, he cried for his parents, who were back in Tokyo. Unable to cope with his constant crying, his teacher sent him back to his parents. Evacuees were viewed with hostility at the time, and even in Ryūō, the village children teased him mercilessly, calling him a "spoiled city kid" and a "crybaby." His days became a cycle of crying, yet he stayed there for about a year and a half.

After the war finally ended, he returned cheerful and talkative, as he would run through the streets to gather up playmates and entertain by imitating the rakugo stories he heard from the radio at the evacuation site he stayed in and the G.I.s he saw in town. On his change in personality, Kimotsuki reflected years later as an adult, "I guess I was a city boy after all." He felt really happy to be back in Tokyo, and his old playmates felt like kindred spirits to him. He re-analyzed that moment in his lifetime, saying, "I was so moved I wanted to hug them," and "I was incredibly happy."

=== Becoming an actor ===
When he advanced to junior high school, Kimotsuki took a required entrance exam for a private school but failed. At that time, he dreamed of becoming a movie actor and auditioned twice.

In his second year of junior high, he went to audition for director Keisuke Kinoshita's film Boyhood and was able to clear the second round. With a massive boost in confidence, Kimotsuki traveled to Ōfuna for a camera test in the snow, but he was unsuccessful. The child actor who was ultimately chosen went on to become an actor. Kimotsuki said in a 1999 interview that sometime later he saw that same person on a variety show where they said they were burdened with many debts, to which seeing it made him realize how tough it was being a star and that he was ultimately glad he didn't win the part in the end.

To take his mind off things, Kimotsuki often listened to radio dramas. One day, when he went to watch a public recording of The Fountain of Stories on NHK, he thought he could work at the place it was performed, and that was the spark that made him aspire to become a film actor. His idol was actor Kenichi Enomoto. But his grandmother told him he didn't have the looks to become a film actor, which made him decide to instead aim to perform voice acting in radio dramas.

He went to Teikyo Junior and Senior High School, where he founded a drama club. After performing Junji Kinoshita's play Twilight Crane, Kimotsuki decided to pursue an acting career.

=== Career ===
After Kimotsuki completed high school, he gave up attending university due to the death of his father. He applied for the fourth class of Radio Tokyo (now TBS) Broadcasting Troupe but was unsuccessful, as instead he joined the Shichiyōkai Theater Company while working at Takashimaya. While working for Takashimaya, he joined theater troupe Shichiyōkai. At the time, Shichiyōkai worked with NHK, which caused Kimotsuki to start making appearances in NHK's radio dramas. To solidify his personal resolve to make a living as an actor, he decided to leave Takashimaya. However, even after he made his debut as a voice actor, he was short on money, so he gathered some friends and established his own travel agency. At the same time, he juggled several part-time jobs as a tour escort, banquet MC, shoe shiner, and dentist. After Shichiyōkai disbanded, he auditioned and was accepted as part of the opening performance at the Nissay Theatre alongside Takeshi Aono. Following a stint with the theater troupe Sakuhinza, which had split from the Shichiyōkai, Kimotsuki was invited to join a company that was established by Koichi Chiba, who was a former member of the TBS Broadcasting Theater Troupe and was recruiting actors.

Kimotsuki's affiliated production companies throughout his career were Kiri no Kai, Sanko Office, Kawa no Kai, Ezaki Office, Actor Project, Tokyo Actor's Consumer's Cooperative Society, Mausu Promotion, Aoni Production, Production Baobab, and even his own company 21st Century FOX. As of February 2016, he was affiliated with 81 Produce. He had also been previously affiliated with Office Boro and Winner Entertainment.

His feature film debut was in When the Kobushi Flowers Bloom. At the time, he was still a theater troupe trainee and was credited under his birth name, Kanemasa Kimotsuki, playing a young barber. Aside from this, he also was in the pornographic film Woman of Shame, but both movies are his only appearances as an actor in live-action feature films.

His radio drama debut was in Women's Hour where he played an errand boy working for a dry cleaner. He had only two lines, but since everything was broadcast live back then, he remembered the tension performing his lines all the way until his death.

His voice acting debut was as a member of a motorcycle gang in the drama District Attorney. When he first appeared in an anime, he had already done dubbing for children's dramas, so he found it easy to match with the dialogue.

During a small theater boom in the 1980s, he encountered Sō Kitamura's Kotobuki Uta and was deeply touched by the play. Motivated by his strong desire to pursue theater work as an actor, Kimotsuki found the script for Kitamura's Eleven Boys at Kinokuniya and wanted to perform a play using it. He obtained permission to do so, gathered people from the training school where he was teaching, and in September 1983, left both Garakuta Kobo and Production Baobab in order to start his theater company 21st Century FOX.

The original members of 21st Century FOX included Takeru Miyashita, Matsuo Matsuo, Kei Hayami, and Kumiko Nishihara, with Kappei Yamaguchi joining shortly after. Within the troupe, Kimotsuki directed and structured productions, also serving as a mentor and trained younger actors. In 2008, the troupe celebrated its 25th anniversary by holding a commemorative performance in December that year that featured former members like Kentarō Itō.

In 1985, from November to December, he was hospitalized for vocal cord throat surgery. His roles as Suneo Honekawa in Doraemon and Hakase in Obake no Q-Tarō were temporarily filled in by Naoki Tatsuta. Fearful of his voice becoming clean after the surgery, the laryngeal polyp was crushed using tweezers.

=== Awards ===
In 2004, Kimotsuki received the Rikiya Tayama Award at the 14th Japanese Movie Critics Awards alongside Doraemon co-stars Nobuyo Ōyama, Noriko Ohara, Michiko Nomura, and Kazuya Tatekabe for the 25th anniversary of the Doraemon film series. In November 2006, they received the Special Award at the 11th Animation Kobe. and the following year in March 2007, they received the 3rd Lifetime Achievement Award at the Tokyo International Anime Fair.

In 2012, Kimotsuki received the Achievement Award at the 6th Seiyu Awards.

=== Final years ===
In 2010, Kimotsuki was diagnosed with lung cancer.

Around May 2016, his physical health started to worsen, and he was diagnosed with pneumonia at a hospital in Tokyo. He was hospitalized for tests several times and continued his voice acting career after being discharged, but his condition worsened even further by October that year.

=== Death ===
Kimotsuki died from pneumonia on October 20, 2016, at the age of 80.

His grave is located at Tsukiji Hongwanji Nishitama Cemetery in Akiruno, Tokyo.

=== Posthumous releases & legacy ===
His last acting appearance was in an episode of the NHK Radio program Radio Midnight for the segment Series: Voices that Created an Era which broadcast on November 6, 2016; his dialogue having been recorded on September 19, one month before he died.

In January 2017, Kimotsuki was ranked 23rd place in a special program Popular Voice Actors 200 Seriously Choose! Voice Actor General Election! 3-Hour Special, which broadcast on TV Asahi.

In November 2019, Jajamaru from Niko Niko Pun appeared in the NHK family concert Let's Go On The Mysterious Train, held to celebrate the 60th anniversary of Okaasan to Issho, but with no replacement voice actor available, archive audio of Kimotsuki's lines for Jajamaru were used.

== Personality ==
Being the third son out of six children, Kimotsuki got married at the age of 24 and had a son and a daughter. His personal motto was "Respect Heaven and Love People."

=== Features ===
His voice range was tenor.

Kimotsuki's voice had been considered distinctive since childhood, but he himself only realized it was unique after he started voice acting. In high school, he played leading roles for the radio drama club and thought he had a good voice. After joining the Tokyo Broadcasting Theater Company, he thought he wanted to play leading roles in radio dramas, but decided not to do so.

Kimotsuki's spoken dialects were Kagoshima and Kansai.

As he had been active since the early days of Japanese animation, Kimotsuki's voice acting roles generally consisted of bully leaders, grandpas, and grandmas, none of them being good lookers, but supporting characters.

After voicing Godzilla in the first television adaptation of Fujiko Fujio's Obake no Q-Tarō, he started taking on more slightly mischievous character roles.

Regarding memorable works, Kimotsuki cited his first leading role as Kurobē in Jungle Kurobē and Barbapapa. Particularly in Barbapapa, he and Noriko Ohara voiced all of the series' characters themselves and they also performed the theme song for the three children, which was released on vinyl record format. He later remarked he was probably the first voice actor to ever become a "singing voice actor."

Kimotsuki was asked to perform the theme song for Jungle Kurobē, but the song's tempo was too fast for him, so Kumiko Ōsugi performed instead. Later on down the line, when voicing Jajamaru in Niko Niko Pun, he normally sang about 2,000 songs, with a pace of three episodes a week. He recalled that while he was singing, he gradually learned the rhythm, but that the first two or three years doing so were very difficult.

In The Monster Kid, the monster trio of Count Dracula, Wolfman, and Franken perform the song "We Are the Monster Trio". However, the voice actors of the characters, consisting of Kimotsuki, Takuzo Kamiyama, and Tarō Sagami respectively, were tone-deaf in singing, which composer Asei Kobayashi had an extremely difficult time working with.

For foreign film dubbing, he provided the Japanese dub voice for Woody Allen and Jerry Lewis in several works.

In Disney films, he voiced Donald Duck. Takuya Fujioka, the Japanese dubbing actor of Donald until he took over, became busy doing film and television dramas, so Kimotsuki took over as his official replacement.

He also voiced Jiminy Cricket, Roquefort, and Scuttle in the Japanese dubbed versions of Disney films.

He stepped down from the role of Suneo Honekawa in the Doraemon franchise on March 18, 2005, but continued to provide the character's voice in projects such as the narrator for Trivia no Izumi. He continued his career as a voice actor well into his later years, such as Horrorman in Let's Go! Anpanman and Tom in the Japanese dubbed versions of the Tom and Jerry cartoons.

He also worked as a lecturer in the voice acting department at the Tokyo Animation College.

In 2006, Kimotsuki formed the Paradise Troupe alongside Ichiro Inui, the president of the Bungakuza theater company, and director Masami Uryu.

=== About his works ===
He has appeared in almost all works based off the stories written by the Fujiko Fujio duo, with his first role in a Fujiko Fujio anime being the character Godzilla in the 1965 adaptation of Obake no Q-Tarō.

At the time, child roles were almost exclusively done by female voice actors like Michie Kita and Masako Nozawa, and there were few characters with strong personalities. He was left unsure if he could actually pull off portraying a young character. He later stated that up until then, he felt like all that he did was done half-heartedly, he wasn't succeeding as an actor, and even when playing roles, he couldn't fully immerse himself and become the character.

When he voiced Godzilla in Q-Tarō, his manager told him that while he was funny outside the studio, he was boring on the inside. During the recording session for the fourth episode, he decided to started improvising dialogue. Fujiko F. Fujio, who was observing the recording session, clapped his hands and loved it. it became the catalyst for him being specifically requested by the original author for roles. Even for projects where Kimotsuki hadn't been specifically requested, Fujiko would ask during production what he would do. Previously, improvisations weren't accepted, as he had been told to just stick to what was written in the scripts.

After breaking through with Godzilla in Q-Tarō, he started getting more child character roles. Works by Fujiko he didn't appear in include Chimpui and Mojako.

For Jungle Kurobē, he originally auditioned for the role of Kurobē's father. When he was informed the part had been settled on, he thought he got the role, but was instead cast as the main protagonist. Recording was hard and extremely grueling, as he had to raise his voice constantly, which exhausted him.

For the television adaptation of Doraemon on TV Asahi, he voiced Suneo Honekawa from 1979 to 2005. Kimotsuki previously voiced Takeshi "Gian" Gōda in the first television adaptation of Doraemon on NNS. He admitted in his later years that he had very little memory voicing Gian and mistakenly believed it was a black-and-white anime.

On March 15, 2008, he made a guest appearance alongside Doraemon co-star Nobuyo Ōyama on the Kansai Television program Nanbo DE Nanbo. They discussed personal memories recording episodes of Doraemon together and their feelings towards their roles over the years.

Several ad-libs Kimotsuki made in the roles he portrayed became part of the character's established traits or a signature line of theirs, such as Tsutomu's dialect in Kiteretsu Daihyakka, Suneo's line "You're so cheeky for someone like Nobita!" in Doraemon, and the line "Ossu!! It's Jajamaru-san!" in Niko Niko Pun.

The role that made Kimotsuki realize he was suited to manga was the aforementioned Donald Duck, for he didn't have many script lines and mainly improvised. He realized he was suited to the field of work when he performed at the original tempo without breaking the storyline. Later on, when he appeared in Let's Go Hector, he felt that "fast-paced roles like anime would be better", which gave him the confidence needed and led to him receiving more voice acting roles.

When he voiced the Conductor in the television adaptation of Galaxy Express 999, he recalled it as the most challenging voice acting role he had ever done and the original author of the manga, Leiji Matsumoto, did not reveal the Conductor's true identity to Kimotsuki, who initially portrayed the character with a serious, conscientious image, but upon finding out the truth, he remarked, "If I had known from the beginning that he was a blank slate, I wouldn't have been able to play the role" before laughing.

He often appeared as a voice actor in the numerous television adaptations of manga artist Fujio Akatsuka's works. Kimotsuki made a guest appearance in the Yūji's Honest Room segment for Onegai! Ranking, where he revealed that Akatsuka did not approve of him as Iyami's voice actor for the second Osomatsu-kun television adaptation. Kyōji Kobayashi, who voiced Iyami for the first television adaptation of Osomatsu-kun in 1966, portrayed the character relatively quickly with a gentlemanly tone, while Kimotsuki emphasized his sarcastic and cunning characteristics, making it a completely different take. Akatsuka had even made his discomfort open to those around him, expressing, "He's completely different from before." However, after Osomatsu-kun ended the following year, Akatsuka had grown to accept Kimotsuki's Iyami, saying, "Maybe it's okay to say that he's a different type of Iyami." Kimotsuki performed the role with such intensity that after he recorded his lines, he would often quip, "I broke seven capillaries today."

In Dokaben, he voiced Tonma Hitori. Tonma's "zura" speech pattern is a Yamanashi dialect, so he incorporated his own personal experiences from when he was there into the role. Tonma joined the Orix Buffaloes as the 5th draft pick in Dokaben: Professional Baseball Edition, and his "pendulum swing batting style was even imitated by Ichiro", leading him to providing commentary in-character during professional baseball broadcasts. He even had his Twitter account go under "tonoma_zura_".

=== Relationships ===
Kimotsuki had a close friendship with voice actor and manager Kazuya Tatekabe for over 50 years. In a 1982 interview with Kibitsu, he said that he and Tatekabe's voice were similar in tone.

In 2004, when interviewed for the 25th anniversary of the Doraemon anime series, Kimotsuki stated, "In terms of personality, Mr. Tatekabe and I are completely different. We were both in the same theater troupe, and we had similar problems. There was a time when it was fashionable to have discussions about everything, and when I talked to Mr. Tatekabe during that time, I found his perspective very insightful. I thought, 'So that's another way of thinking about it.'" When Tatekabe passed away in 2015, Kimotsuki himself delivered the wake address and the funeral eulogy at his services, concluding both calling out to Gian in-character as Suneo doing his voice, a reference to their roles in the Doraemon series.

Kimotsuki and Masako Nozawa often co-starred in animated productions such as Galaxy Express 999, The Monster Kid, Doraemon, Ultra B, Gutsy Frog, and Dororon Enma-kun, to which Nozawa herself once jokingly remarked, "We're closer than a married couple because we spend so much time together."

Kimotsuki also worked with fellow theater troupe member Takeshi Aono as bartenders at a snack bar. They hit it off and constantly improvised, becoming known as the "Comedy Bartenders", with their witty bantering being a huge hit with customers.

The "Kappei" in Kappei Yamaguchi's stage name originated from Kimotsuki, who was his mentor, referring to him as "Inakappei" because he still had a strong Fukuoka accent.

Kimotsuki also named the acting unit "Sannin no Kai" (The Three-Person Group), consisting of Yamaguchi, Tomokazu Seki, and Wataru Takagi.

=== Hobbies, interests, and skills ===
Kimotsuki's personal hobbies included sports (mainly golf) and creating model railroads.

In junior high school, Kimotsuki had wanted to become a technician. He enjoyed working, and my parents would encourage him to pursue it. Whenever he was making models, Kimotsuki used to craft them from wood by himself. Next door to his house at the time lived a craftsman who created musical instruments, and Kimotsuki would watch from afar. That made him think, "Making instruments seems interesting too", so during his second junior high school year, he made a chair using a board from the household shrine altar, though his mother got very angry at him for doing so. During his theater troupe days, a play needed a cake prop, but a real cake would not work. So he got plaster from his part-time job and made one out of that. He also made a pistol, using only photos as reference, by joining pieces of Japanese oak. He made a 38 Smith & Wesson caliber revolver, so the cylinder part rotated. Afterwards, people kept asking him to build things, but he refrained because it was growing to interfere with his career as an actor. His wife would ask him to build shelves sometimes, but he did not like that kind of work, and his personal sense of pride would not let it happen.

Kimotsuki's special skills were rakugo (comic storytelling) and nagauta (traditional ballad singing). He would perform rakugo at an elementary school appreciation event and aspired to be a rakugo artist during his student days. His high school senior was Kokinji Katsura, who would visit his sophomore year school and perform a rakugo piece. Kimotsuki would persistently beg to be taken in as an apprentice Kokinji's performances, but Kokinji was a Shochiku star, so told him that he was not a rakugo performer and did not take in apprentices. He also possessed a creative visionary side, as the "Voice Actor Festival" event held for young voice actors in the 1980s was an idea that he conceived. He was also skilled with machinery. When his company 21st Century FOX faced deficits, he personally edited and sold videos in order to cover for the losses.

He loved movies, particularly being influenced by his grandparents who enjoyed Western films, with Chaplin's movies especially leaving a strong impression on him. At his fifth birthday celebration, he would insist on having his picture taken while holding a cane.

He was a fast runner. At the age of 50, he appeared on TV Asahi's "Beat Takeshi's Sports Champion" and won the 100m dash (time: 11.2 seconds). He was so fast he beat Karl-Heinz Rummenigge in a race, though it was actually a 90m dash due to a handicap.

Until around the age of 50, Kimotsuki could not drink alcohol at all. He and Seizō Katō, also a non-drinker, would often attend program wrap-up parties and drink only cola. In his later years, he was able to drink, albeit small amounts.

== Successors ==
Following Kimotsuki's resignations from his advancing age and subsequent death, the following individuals listed below have taken over some of his established voice roles.

Successor	Character	Works	Debut
Tetsuo Gotō	Scuttle	The Little Mermaid	The Little Mermaid II: Return to the Sea
Kōji Ishii	Scuttle	The Little Mermaid	Disney's House of Mouse
Naoki Tatsuta	Roquefort	The Aristocats	Additional dub recordings
Setsuji Satō	Tom	Tom and Jerry	The Tom and Jerry Show
Kazuki Yao	Horrorman	Let's Go! Anpanman	Let's Go! Anpanman: Bulbul's Big Treasure Hunt Adventure
Hirohiko Kakegawa	Chocolatepanman	Let's Go! Anpanman	TBA
Yōhei Tadano	Jiminy Cricket	Pinocchio	Kingdom Hearts III

== Filmography ==
=== Television animation ===
List of voice performances in television animation
Year	Title	Role	Notes	Source
1963–1966	Astro Boy	Roboid, Atom's father, Ham Egg	Substitute	
1963–1964	8 Man	Additional voice		
1964	0-sen Hayato	Additional voice		
1964–1965	Big X	Additional voice		
1965–1967	Q-Tarō the Ghost	Tsuyoshi "Godzilla" Saigō		
1967	Gokū no Daibōken	Villager A		
1967–1968	The Golden Bat	Additional voice		
1967–1968	Perman	Kabao		
1967–1968	Princess Knight	Additional voice		
1968	Detective Brat Pack	Subordinate B		
1968–1971	Star of the Giants	Additional voice		
1968	Fight Da!! Pyuta	Sayuri's father, Commander Domelia		
1968–1969	Kaibutsu-kun	Banno		
1968–1969	Sunset Banchō	Additional voice		
1969–1970	Undersea Boy Marine	Henchman		
1969	Umeboshi Denka	Additional voice		
1969	Judo Boy	Additional voice		
1969	Kamui	Seppa, Hayane		
1969–1970	Otoko Ippiki Gaki Daishō	Masae Mito (The Old Lady of Mito)		
1969–1970	The Genie Family	Bus driver, Cow, Conductor, Horse owner, Butler		
1969–1971	Attack No. 1	Ichinose's father		
1970–1971	Tomorrow's Joe	Skinny Pine, Inmate C		
1970	Bakuhatsu Gorō	Clear Water		
1970–1971	Akakichi no Eleven	Jiro Komano		
1970–1971	Granny Mischief	Noboru		
1970–1971	Norakuro	Humble		
1971	Andersen Monogatari	Japanese Beetle, Lion et al.		
1971	Golgo 13	Additional voice		
1971	Animentary: Ketsudan	Additional voice		
1971–1972	New Q-Tarō the Ghost	Tsuyoshi "Godzilla" Saigō, Tanu Jiro		
1971–1972	Tensai Bakabon	Additional voice		
1971–1972	Marvelous Melmo	God C		
1971–1972	Kunimatsu-sama no Otōridai	Ino		
1972	Pinocchio: The Series	Cricket, Prison Guard, Fisherman, Minions, Sawshark, additional voice		
1972	Triton of the Sea	Cal		
1972–1973	Devilman	Additional voice		
1972–1974	Science Ninja Team Gatchaman	Butler		
1972–1973	Hazedon	Pooyan		
1972–1974	The Gutsy Frog	Street Vendor, Dad, Additional voice		
1973	Demetan Croaker, The Boy Frog	Elder Beard Man, Resident, Kun-san		
1973	Fables of the Green Forest	Harry of the Ten		
1973	Jungle Kurobē	Kurobē	Lead role	
1973	Doraemon	Takeshi "Gian" Gōda		
1973	Little Wansa	Gamble		
1973–1974	Kōya no Shōnen Isamu	Additional voice		
1973	Microid S	Kankuro		
1973–1974	Miracle Girl Limit-chan	Ryūta Ishibashi (Boss)		
1973–1974	Casshan	OOA No., Luger		
1973–1974	Karate Master	Additional voice		
1973–1974	Dororon Enma-kun	Kapaeru		
1973–1974	Samurai Giants	Additional voice		
1974	Heidi, Girl of the Alps	Sebastian		
1974–1976	Vicky the Viking	Additional voice		
1974–1975	Majokko Megu-chan	Additional voice		
1974	New Honeybee Hutch	Additional voice		
1974–1975	Great Mazinger	Reptilian General Draydou		
1974–1976	First Human Giatrus	Father		
1974–1975	Calimero	Peter		
1975–1976	The Adventures of Maya the Honey Bee	Termite		
1975–1976	Reideen the Brave	Berostan		
1975	Gamba no Bouken	Dolphin		
1975	Shogun in His Boyhood	Kinoshita Tōkichirō		
1975–1976	Time Bokan	Mondōru, Dr. Tomoda, Little Devil	Mondōru features in episode 9	
1975–1977	Original Genius Bakabon	Officer, Additional voice		
1976–1977	Dino Mech Gaiking	Chin		
1976	Machine Hayabusa	Yoshihiko Yamato		
1976	Gowappa 5 Gōdam	Godaemon		
1976–1977	Adventures of Pinocchio	Rocco the Bird		
1976–1977	Blocker Gundan 4 Machine Blaster	Chibisuki		
1976–1979	Candy Candy	Alistair "Stear" Cornwell		
1976–1977	Paul's Miraculous Adventure	The Spirit of the Mayfly		
1976–1977	Manga Hana no Kakarichō	Additional voice		
1976–1979	Dokaben	Kazuto Tonoma		
1976–1977	Robokko Beeton	Oh Hender, Numassy-chan, Pickpocket, Gorilla, Doctor, Additional voice		
1977–1979	Yatterman	Yokubaba, Minicui, Grandpa, Elderly Person, Witch		
1977	Monarch: The Big Bear of Tallac	Phaco		
1977–1978	Balatack	Dr. Gobra		
1977–1978	Ippatsu Kanta-kun	Yamada		
1977–1978	Balloon Girl Temple	Gappe		
1977–1978	Nobody's Boy: Remi	Additional voice		
1977–1980	New Lupin the Third	Additional voice		
1977–1978	Angie Girl	Benjamin, Khan, Fireworks Shop, Douglas		
1977–1979	Song of Baseball Enthusiasts	Jin-kusu		
1978–1979	Starzinger	Matsudo		
1978–1979	Haikara-San: Here Comes Miss Modern	Imprint, Drunken Boy		
1978	One Million-Year Trip: Bandar Book	Dr. Sharaku		
1978–1981	Galaxy Express 999	Conductor, Police		
1978–1979	Treasure Island	Ben Gunn		
1979–1980	Zenderman	Master Gikē, Old Man, Old Man with a Hump	Old Man in episode 15, Old Man with a Hump in episode 16	
1979	Japan Fairytale Masterpiece Series: Heart of the Red Bird	Additional voice		
1979–1980	Cyborg 009	007 / Sir Great Britain		
1979–2005	Doraemon	Suneo Honekawa		
1980	Back to the Forest	Yakobus	Television film	
1980	Galaxy Express 999: Eternal Traveller Emeraldas	Conductor	Television special	
1979	Bannertail: The Story of Gray Squirrel	Radoru		
1979–1980	The Adventures of Marco Polo	Omar		
1979	Undersea Super Train: Marine Express	Sharaku		
1979–1980	Misha the Bear Cub	Drago Tragon		
1979	Galaxy Express 999: Can You Live Like a Warrior!?	Conductor	Television special	
1980	Cheerful Dwarves of the Forest: Belfy & Lillibit	Docklin (aka "Dr. Snoozabit")		
1980–1982	The Monster Kid	Dracula		
1980–1981	Astro Boy	Drop-3, Dr. Mazeb	Drop-3 in episode 9, Dr. Mazeb in episode 44	
1980	Galaxy Express 999: Can You Love Like a Mother!?	Conductor	Television special	
1980–1981	Hoero! Bun Bun	Ponta		
1981–1982	Belle and Sebastian	Lyon		
1981–1987	Ninja Hattori-kun	Kemuzou Kemumaki		
1981–1983	Chie the Brat	An Old Man Cat from The Tohoku Region		
1981–1982	Dash Kappei	Village Chief	episodes 12-13	
1981–1986	Urusei Yatsura	Manchinro, The Devil, Count Dracula, The Old Master, Chief, Additional voice		
1982	Lucy of the Southern Rainbow	Dayton		
1982–1983	Go For It, Ippatsuman!	Kon Corudo, Trelawny, Soryasooda		
1982–1983	Magical Princess Minky Momo	Count		
1982	Game Center Arashi	Komanosuke		
1982	Don Dracula	Yasubei the Bat		
1982–1983	The Mysterious Cities of Gold	Pedro		
1982	Ninjaman Ippei	School Mask		
1982–1983	Tokimeki Tonight	Bulldog		
1982	Pro Golfer Saru	Narrator, Manager, Commentator, Elderly Man, Golfer A, Additional voice	Television special	
1983–1984	Miyuki	Ueda		
1983–1985	Perman	Perman #4 (Hōzen Ōyama)		
1983	Itadakiman	Director		
1983–1984	Creamy Mami, the Magic Angel	Negative		
1984	Chickun Takkun	Takkun Hat		
1985–1987	Q-Tarō the Ghost	Doctor		
1986	Robotan	Additional voice		
1986	Ultraman Kids Proverb Stories	Gattsun		
1986–1987	Anmitsu Hime	Guardian of the Bitter Taste		
1986–1987	The Wonderful Wizard of Oz	Old Crow, Additional voice		
1987–1989	Ultra B	Papa		
1987–1989	Mami the Psychic	Suneo Honekawa, Fisherman		
1988–1989	Osomatsu-kun	Iyami		
1988–1996	Kiteretsu Large Encyclopedia	Clockwork Warrior, Kiteretsusai, Benzō Karino, Genta	First voice of Clockwork Warrior and Kiteretsusai	
1988–1989	Bigger and Better: Dommel & Ron	Ron		
1988	New Pro Golfer Saru	Manager		
1988–1989	Billiken	Additional voice		
1988–present	Let's Go! Anpanman	Chocolatepanman, Horrorman	first voice	
1989	Billiken Nandemo Shōkai	Dr. Torino		
1989–1991	Parasol Henbē	Tonbee		
1989–1990	Dash! Yonkuro	Village Headman		
1989–1992	The Laughing Salesman	Kyoichi Shiratama	episode 52	
1989	Fujiko F. Fujio Anime Special SF Adventure Time Patrol Bon	Setofuru	Television special	
1990–1991	Idol Angel Yokoso Yoko	Lionel Weber		
1990–1991	NG Knight Ramune & 40	Arara Colyara Yokkora III		
1990–1991	Peesuke	Heisuke Hirano (Peesuke)		
1991–1992	Emergency Takeoff Saver Kids	Dr. Bug		
1991	City Hunter '91	Robber	episode 7	
1991–1992	21 Emon	Sasayama Alien, Onabe, Captain, Detective A, Omiso	Sasayama Alien appears in episode 1, Captain appears in episode 4, Detective A appears in episode 13	
1991	Bakabon: Three Thousand Miles in Search of Osomatsu's Curry	Iyami	Television special	
1991–1992	Flaming Rugby Boy: Dodge Danpei	Venerable Tōkyūji		
1991–1992	Ultraman Kids: 30 Million Light-Years in Search of Mother	Gattsun		
1992–1993	Oi! Ryoma	Kodai Kawada		
1992–1993	Free Kick Toward Tomorrow	Adolf Beckett		
1993–1996	Pokonyan!	Ippongi Mikinosuke		
1994–1995	Red Riding Hood Chacha	Tory, Grandpa Coppett		
1995–1996	The Brave of Gold Goldran	Don't-Waste Grandma		
1996–1998	Gegege no Kitarō	Pillow Turner		
1996–present	Great Detective Conan	Konosuke Jii	first voice	
1996–1998	Rurōni Kenshin -Meiji Kenkaku Roman Tan-	Tadashi Horinaka		
1996–1997	The Legend of Zorro	Indigenous Elder		
1996–1997	You're Under Arrest	Takaya Sugano	episode 19	
1997–2000	The Kindaichi Case Files	Yūichirō Matoba	episodes 1-3	
1998–1999	Bomberman B-Daman Bakugaiden	Dowasurebon		
1998	Trigun	Leonof the Puppetmaster		
1998–1999	The Secret of Akko-chan	Fuusuishi, Feng Shui Scammer		
1998	YAT Untroubled Space Tours	Geruto		
1998–1999	Totsugeki! Pappara-tai	Mizushima's father		
2000–2001	Gambler Densetsu Tetsuya	Nezu		
2002	Wild 7: Another	Hassan		
2003–2006	Golden Gash Bell!!	Grisa		
2003	Cinderella Boy	Dr. Grimm		
2004–2011	Sergeant Keroro	Ambassador from Planet Yakunin	episode 165	
2004	Shura no Toki – Age of Chaos	Tomita Shigeyasu		
2004	Space Symphony Maetel: Galaxy Express 999	Conductor		
2004–2006	Black Jack	Alexe Morozof (Karte 47)		
2007	Shampoo Ōji	King Soap		
2009	Student Council's Discretion	Train Conductor	episode 7	
2014	Yuki Yuna Is a Hero	Maro/Yoshiteru	Maro appears in episode 3, Yoshiteru appears in episodes 5, 8, and 11	

=== Theatrical animation ===
List of voice performances in theatrical animation
Year	Title	Role	Notes	Source
1969	Star of the Giants	Additional voice		
1971	Do It! Yasuji's Pornorama!!	Additional voice		
1975	Hans Christian Andersen's The Little Mermaid	Crab, Triton's Trumpet Snail		
1979	Triton of the Sea	Karu		
1979	Adventures of the Polar Cubs	Liquor		
1979	Galaxy Express 999	Conductor		
1979	Good Luck!! Tabuchi-kun!!	Owner Tsutsumi		
1980	Doraemon: Nobita's Dinosaur	Suneo Honekawa		
1980	Galaxy Express 999: Claire of Glass	Conductor		
1980	Good Luck!! Tabuchi-kun!! 2nd Bullet: The Heat of the Pennant Race	Owner Tsutsumi		
1980	Makoto-chan	Makoto-Mushi		
1980	Good Luck!! Tabuchi-kun!! Hatsu Warai 3rd Bullet: Aa Tsuppari Jinsei	Owner Tsutsumi		
1980	Cyborg 009: Legend of the Super Galaxy	007 / Sir Great Britain		
1981	Doraemon: The Record of Nobita, Spaceblazer	Suneo Honekawa		
1981	The Monster Kid: Invitation to Monster Land	Dracula		
1981	Tomorrow's Joe 2	Additional voice		
1981	21 Emon: Welcome to Space!	Gonsuke		
1981	Doraemon: What Am I for Momotarō?	Suneo Honekawa	Short film	
1981	Adieu Galaxy Express 999 -Andromeda Terminal Station-	Conductor		
1982	Gauche the Cellist	Cuckoo		
1982	Doraemon: Nobita and the Haunts of Evil	Suneo Honekawa		
1982	Ninja Hattori-kun: Abracadabra Magic Picture Diary	Kemuzō Kemumaki		
1982	The Monster Kid: The Demon Sword	Dracula		
1983	Doraemon: Nobita and the Castle of the Undersea Devil	Suneo Honekawa		
1983	Ninja Hattori-kun: Abracadabra Hometown Battle Diary	Kemuzō Kemumaki		
1984	Sherlock Hound: Blue Ruby Chapter and Treasure at the Bottom of the Ocean Chapter	Todd		
1984	Doraemon: Nobita's Great Adventure into the Underworld	Suneo Honekawa		
1984	Ninja Hattori-kun + Perman: Psychic Wars	Kemuzō Kemumaki		
1985	Doraemon: Nobita's Little Star Wars	Suneo Honekawa		
1985	Ninja Hattori-kun + Perman: Ninja Beast Jippō vs. Miracle Egg	Kemuzō Kemumaki, Perman #4 (Hōzen Ōyama)		
1986	Doraemon: Nobita and the Steel Troops	Suneo Honekawa		
1986	Little Ghost Q-Tarō: Jump Out! The Great Bake-Bake Operation	Hakase		
1987	Doraemon: Nobita and the Knights on Dinosaurs	Suneo Honekawa		
1987	Little Ghost Q-Tarō: Jump Out! Operation 1/100	Hakase		
1988	The Legend of the Forest: Part-1	Coco Spider	Short film	
1988	Doraemon: The Record of Nobita's Parallel Visit to the West	Suneo Honekawa		
1988	Ultra B: The Dictator B.B. from the Black Hole!!	Papa		
1989	Doraemon: Nobita and the Birth of Japan	Suneo Honekawa		
1989	Dorami-chan: Mini-Dora SOS!!!	Suneki Honekawa, Future Suneo Honekawa	Short film	
1989	Osomatsu-kun: Hello from the Watermelon Star, Zansu!	Iyami	Short film	
1990	It's the Ocean! It's Time to Sail! Niko Niko, Pun	Jajamaru		
1990	Maji!	Boss		
1990	Doraemon: Nobita and the Animal Planet	Suneo Honekawa		
1991	Doraemon: Nobita's Dorabian Nights	Suneo Honekawa		
1991	Dorami-chan: Wow, The Kid Gang of Bandits!	Sunemaru	Short film	
1991	Let's Go! Anpanman: Fly! Fly! Chibigon	Horrorman		
1992	Doraemon: Nobita and the Kingdom of Clouds	Suneo Honekawa		
1992	21 Emon: To Space! The Barefoot Princess	Onabe		
1993	Doraemon: Nobita and the Tin Labyrinth	Suneo Honekawa		
1993	Sanpei the Kappa	Grim Reaper		
1993	Let's Go! Anpanman: Nosshi the Dinosaur's Big Adventure	Horrorman		
1994	Doraemon: Nobita's Three Visionary Swordsmen	Suneo Honekawa		
1994	Let's Go! Anpanman: The Lyrical Magical Witch's School	Horrorman		
1994	Let's Go! Anpanman: Everyone Gather Together! Anpanman World	Horrorman	Short film	
1995	Doraemon: Nobita's Diary on the Creation of the World	Suneo Honekawa		
1995	2112: The Birth of Doraemon	Sunerobo	Short film	
1995	Let's Go! Anpanman: Let's Defeat the Haunted Ship!!	Horrorman		
1996	Doraemon: Nobita and the Galaxy Super-express	Suneo Honekawa		
1996	Let's Go! Anpanman: The Flying Picture Book and the Glass Shoes	Horrorman		
1996	Let's Go! Anpanman: Baikinman and the 3-"Bai" Punch	Horrorman	Short film	
1997	Doraemon: Nobita and the Spiral City	Suneo Honekawa		
1997	Let's Go! Anpanman: The Pyramid of the Rainbow	Horrorman		
1997	Jungle Emperor: The Movie	Coco		
1998	Doraemon: Nobita's Great Adventure in the South Seas	Suneo Honekawa		
1998	Doraemon Comes Back	Suneo Honekawa	Short film	
1998	Galaxy Express 999: Eternal Fantasy	Conductor		
1998	Let's Go! Anpanman: The Palm of the Hand to the Sun	Horrorman		
1999	Doraemon: Nobita Drifts in the Universe	Suneo Honekawa		
1999	Nobita's the Night Before a Wedding	Future Suneo Honekawa	Short film	
1999	Let's Go! Anpanman: When the Flower of Courage Opens	Horrorman		
2000	Doraemon: Nobita and the Legend of the Sun King	Suneo Honekawa		
2000	A Grandmother's Recollections	Suneo Honekawa	Short film	
2000	Let's Go! Anpanman: The Tears of the Mermaid Princess	Horrorman		
2001	Doraemon: Nobita and the Winged Braves	Suneo Honekawa		
2001	Good Luck! Gian!!	Suneo Honekawa	Short film	
2001	Let's Go! Anpanman: Gomira's Star	Horrorman		
2001	Let's Go! Anpanman: The Amazing Naganegiman and Yakisobapanman	Horrorman	Short film	
2002	Digimon Tamers: Runaway Locomon	Parasimon	Short film	
2002	Doraemon: Nobita and the Robot Kingdom	Suneo Honekawa		
2002	The Day When I Was Born	Suneo Honekawa	Short film	
2002	Let's Go! Anpanman: The Secret of Roll and Laura's Floating Castle	Horrorman		
2002	Let's Go! Anpanman: Tuna Maki-chan and Gold Kamameshidon	Horrorman	Short film	
2003	Doraemon: Nobita and the Windmasters	Suneo Honekawa		
2003	Pa-Pa-Pa The Movie: Perman	Kemuzō Kemumaki, Perman #4 (Hōzen Ōyama)	Short film	
2003	Let's Go! Anpanman: Ruby's Wish	Horrorman		
2003	Let's Go! Anpanman: The Amazing Naganegiman and Princess Doremi	Horrorman	Short film	
2003	Inuyasha the Movie: Swords of an Honorable Ruler	Saya		
2004	Doraemon: Nobita in the Wan-Nyan Spacetime Odyssey	Suneo Honekawa		
2004	Pa-Pa-Pa The Movie: Perman – Octopus with a Pop! Legs with a Pon!	Kemuzō Kemumaki, Perman #4 (Hōzen Ōyama)	Short film	
2004	Let's Go! Anpanman: Nyanii of the Country of Dream Cats	Horrorman		
2004	Let's Go! Anpanman: Tsukiko and Shiratama ~Heart-racing Dancing~	Horrorman	Short film	
2005	Let's Go! Anpanman: Happy's Big Adventure	Horrorman		
2005	Let's Go! Anpanman: Princess Snow-black and Popular Baikinman	Horrorman	Short film	
2006	Let's Go! Anpanman: Dolly of the Star of Life	Horrorman		
2006	Let's Go! Anpanman: Kokin-chan and the Blue Tears	Horrorman	Short film	
2007	Let's Go! Anpanman: Purun of the Bubble Ball	Horrorman		
2007	Let's Go! Anpanman: Horrorman and Hora-horako	Horrorman	Short film	
2008	Let's Go! Anpanman: Rinrin the Fairy's Secret	Horrorman		
2008	Let's Go! Anpanman: Hiyahiyahiyarico and Babu-Babu-Baikinman	Horrorman	Short film	
2009	Let's Go! Anpanman: Dadandan and the Twin Stars	Horrorman		
2009	Let's Go! Anpanman: Baikinman VS Baikinman!?	Horrorman	Short film	
2010	Let's Go! Anpanman: Blacknose and the Magical Song	Horrorman		
2010	Let's Go! Anpanman: Run! The Exciting Anpanman Grand Prix	Horrorman	Short film	
2011	Let's Go! Anpanman: Rescue! Kokorin and the Star of Miracles	Horrorman		
2011	Let's Go! Anpanman: Sing and Play! Anpanman and the Treasure in the Forest	Horrorman	Short film	
2012	Let's Go! Anpanman: Revive Banana Island	Horrorman		
2012	Let's Go! Anpanman: Rhythm and Play! Anpanman and the Strange Parasol	Horrorman	Short film	
2013	Let's Go! Anpanman: Fly! The Handkerchief of Hope	Horrorman		
2013	Let's Go! Anpanman: Fun for Everyone! Anpanman and the Mischievous Ghosts	Horrorman	Short film	
2014	Let's Go! Anpanman: Apple Boy and the Wishes For Everyone	Horrorman		
2015	Let's Go! Anpanman: Mija and the Magic Lamp	Horrorman		
2015	Let's Go! Anpanman: Sing and Rhythm! Anpanman Summer Festival	Horrorman	Short film	
2016	Let's Go! Anpanman: Nanda and Runda of the Toy Star	Horrorman	Final film role	

=== Original video animation (OVA) ===
List of voice performances in original video animation
Year	Title	Role	Notes	Source
1978	Doraemon: The Fishing Pond in My Study Room	Suneo Honekawa		
1979	Unico: Black Cloud, White Feathers	Mouse (Garappachi)		
1984	Creamy Mami: Forever Once More	Nega		
1985	Magical Angel Creamy Mami: Long Good-Bye	Nega		
1986	Magical Angel Creamy Mami: Curtain Call	Nega		
1986	Cosmos Pink Shock	Computer		
1988	Urusei Yatsura: Nagisa's Fiancé	Nagisa's father		
1989	Legend of the Galactic Heroes	Huang Louis		
1990	Osomatsu-kun: Iyami Alone in the Wind	Iyami		
1990	The Legend of the Dog Warriors: The Hakkenden	Narration		
1991	NG Knight Lamune & 40 EX: The Panic Triangle – Love's Storm Operation	Arara Koryarya Yokkola III		
1991	Madara	Hakutaku		
1993	The Hakkenden	Narrator		
1993	Heidi, Girl of the Alps: Alm Mountain Chapter	Sebastian		
1993	Heidi, Girl of the Alps: Heidi and Clara Chapter	Sebastian		
1994	Doraemon: Nobita and the Future Notes	Suneo Honekawa		
1994	Key the Metal Idol	Maestro		
1997	Let's Go to the Jungle!	A Ham		
2007	The Galaxy Railways: A Letter from the Abandoned Planet	Conductor		

=== Web anime ===
- Galaxy Express 999: An Energy Journey Beyond Time and Space (2010-2011): Conductor

=== Video games ===
- Doraemon: Nobita's Dorabian Nights (1992): Suneo Honekawa
- Kingdom Hearts (2002): Jiminy Cricket

=== Tokusatsu ===
- Robot Detective (1973): Kowashiman (episodes 5-6), Karateman (episodes 19-20)
- Ganbare!! Robocon (1974): Roboinu
- Chouriki Sentai Ohranger (1995): Butler Acha (episodes 1-15, 17-20, 22-31, 33, 35-48)
- Chouriki Sentai Ohranger Movie (1995): Butler Acha
- Gekisou Sentai Carranger (1996): TT Terurin (ep. 24)
- Moero!!! Robocon (1999): Robogeta

=== Dubbing ===
==== Live-action ====
- The Empire Strikes Back (1980): Cal Alder (Jack McKenzie)
- Ewoks: The Battle for Endor (1985): Willy (Tony Cox)
- Shocker (1989): Sidney Cooper (Sam Scarber)

==== Animation ====
- The Aristocats (1970): Roquefort
- Charlotte's Web (1973): Wilbur
- Darkwing Duck (1991): Quackerjack
- Josie and the Pussycats (1970): Sebastian the Cat
- The Little Mermaid (1989): Scuttle
- Pinocchio (1940): Jiminy Cricket
- Police Academy: The Animated Series (1988): Additional voices
- The Mouse and His Child (1977): Bluejay
- Robin Hood (1973): Friar Tuck
- Tom and Jerry (1940): Tom
- The Tom and Jerry Show (2014): Tom

=== Japanese voice-over ===
- Pinocchio's Daring Journey (1983): Jiminy Cricket
- Star Tours (1987): F-24
- Sindbad's Storybook Voyage (2001): Announcer
- E.T. Adventure (1990): Bigzom
- The Amazing Adventure of Spider-Man the Ride (1999): Softman
- Galaxy Express 999 for Planetarium (2002): Conductor

== Awards ==
Year	Award	Category	Result
2005	Japanese Movie Critics Awards	Rikiya Tayama Award	Won
2006	11th Animation Kobe	Special Award	Won
2007	Tokyo Anime Award	Merit Award	Won
2012	6th Seiyu Awards	Achievement Award	Won
