= Doraemon Comes Back =

1998 film by Ayumu Watanabe

- Cover of the DVD release by Shogakukan and Pony Canyon alongside The Doraemons: The Great Operating of Springing Insects! and Dorami-chan: Mini-Dora SOS!!!
- Kanji: 帰ってきたドラえもん
- Revised Hepburn: Kaettekita Doraemon
- Directed by: Ayumu Watanabe
- Screenplay by: Noboru Shiroyama
- Based on: Doraemon by Fujiko F. Fujio
- Produced by: Jun Kaji; Jun'ichi Kimura; Sōjirō Masuko
- Starring: Nobuyo Ōyama; Noriko Ohara; Kazuya Tatekabe; Kaneta Kimotsuki; Michiko Nomura; Sachiko Chijimatsu; Yōsuke Naka; Keiko Yokozawa
- Edited by: Hajime Okayasu
- Music by: Shunsuke Kikuchi
- Production company: Shin-Ei Animation
- Distributed by: Toho
- Release date: March 7, 1998 (Japan)
- Running time: 27 minutes
- Country: Japan
- Language: Japanese
- Box office: $32.1 million

Doraemon Comes Back (帰ってきたドラえもん, Kaettekita Doraemon) is a 1998 Japanese animated science fiction comedy-drama short film. It premiered in Japan on March 7, 1998 on a triple feature with The Doraemons: The Great Operating of Springing Insects! and Doraemon: Nobita's Great Adventure in the South Seas. It won the 16th Golden Gross Award for Excellence (Silver Prize) at the 16th Golden Gross Awards that year. It is largely an expanded version of the 1974 chapters "Goodbye Doraemon" and "Doraemon Comes Back".

Parts of Stand by Me Doraemon were largely based on this short film.

== Plot ==
As usual, Nobita is bullied by Gian and runs to Doraemon crying. However Doraemon looks depressed. In fact, Doraemon has to return to the future world. Nobita desperately tries to stop him, but after hearing the words of his father Nobisuke and remembering the Daruma doll reminding him of his late grandmother, he remembers that "just like the Daruma doll, you get up even if you fall," and accepts saying goodbye to Doraemon.

After a farewell party is held, the two boys, unable to sleep, take a walk through town at night. While Doraemon is away after getting emotional from Nobita's assurance that he will be okay without him, Nobita encounters Gian, who is also out for a walk in the night. When Gian tries to hit him because of what happened earlier in the day, Nobita, knowing it's a futile effort, takes on Gian alone to dispel Doraemon's worries. When Doraemon searches for Nobita, he sees Nobita standing up to Gian no matter how many times he's beat, and is finally able to make Gian give in. Nobita, battered and bruised, proudly tells Doraemon he defeated Gian all by himself, and Doraemon is moved to tears. Doraemon takes Nobita home, and after making sure he is asleep, returns to the future world.

Nobita grapples with the loneliness of Doraemon's absence, while Doraemon spends his days visiting the park, the place of their last shared memories. Despite this, the two are trying to move forward, with the help of emotional support from Shizuka and Dorami.

Suddenly Nobita is told by Gian that he had seen Doraemon. Nobita buys some dorayaki and searches for Doraemon, but it turns out that the Doraemon he saw was a fake, as it is a disguise worn Suneo. Gian did it as a way of revenge for their fight the other night, using April Fool's Day as an excuse. Filled with frustration and anger, Nobita ignores Shizuka, who came to check on him out of concern, and runs away, leaving the dorayaki he had dropped behind. He uses the Lie 800 gadget that Doraemon left him to turn whatever he says into lies to get revenge on Gian and Suneo, but after he does, feels empty and forgives them both.

Nobita returns home and his mother Tamako asks if he had seen Doraemon to which he tells her that Doraemon isn't coming back. But when Nobita returned to his room, he saw Doraemon having returned home. The effect of the Lie 800 was still in effect, so it came out a lie that Doraemon wasn't coming back. Shizuka, who came to check on Nobita out of concern, and Gian and Suneo, who had come to apologize with a large amount of dorayaki, also reunited with Doraemon, and everyone made peace.

== Cast ==
Character	Japanese voice actor
Doraemon	Nobuyo Ōyama
Nobita Nobi	Noriko Ohara
Takeshi "Gian" Gōda	Kazuya Tatekabe
Suneo Honekawa	Kaneta Kimotsuki
Shizuka Minamoto	Michiko Nomura
Tamako Nobi	Sachiko Chijimatsu
Nobisuke Nobi	Yōsuke Naka
Mrs. Gōda	Kazuyo Aoki
Clerk	Seiko Tomoe
Child	Yūko Satō
Dorami	Keiko Yokozawa

== Production ==
The short film features significant additions and deviations from the original manga chapters, most notably that Shizuka, Dorami, and Nobita’s grandmother, characters who weren't featured in the original stories, were added in to play major roles.

Doraemon Comes Back is the first out of five in a series of Doraemon short films directed by Ayumu Watanabe that released from 1998 to 2002.

The "Doraemon Moving Series", consisting of this work, Nobita's the Night Before a Wedding, A Grandmother's Recollections, Ganbare! Gian!!, and The Day When I Was Born, were all made by people who wanted to carry on the spirit and legacy of Doraemon series creator Fujiko F. Fujio after he died in 1996 by selecting to adapt stories from the manga.

Ayumu Watanabe, director of Doraemon Comes Back, would go on to serve as director of the twenty-sixth Doraemon feature film, Doraemon: Nobita's Dinosaur 2006, a remake of the first Doraemon feature film Doraemon: Nobita's Dinosaur.

== Soundtrack ==
=== Theme song ===
"Blue Sky in the Pocket" (青い空はポケットさ)
Lyrics: Hiroo Takada / Composition and Arrangement: Shunsuke Kikuchi / Vocals: Satoko Yamano

=== Insert song ===
"Doraemon Comes Back (Suite)" (帰ってきたドラえもん (組曲))
Featured as Track 21 on Disc 1 of the "Doraemon Sound Track History ~Shunsuke Kikuchi Music Collection~" album

== Release ==
The short film was released in Japan on March 7, 1998.

It screened theatrically on a triple feature with Doraemon feature film Doraemon: Nobita's Great Adventure in the South Seas and the Doraemons short film The Doraemons: The Great Operating of Springing Insects!.

== Reception ==
=== Box office reception ===
Because the short film was screened as a triple feature with The Doraemons: The Great Operating of Springing Insects! and Doraemon: Nobita's Great Adventure in the South Seas, it grossed ¥2.1 billion yen ($32.1 million) at the Japan box office.

=== Awards ===
It received the 16th Golden Gross Award for Excellence (Silver Prize) at the 16th Golden Gross Awards.

== Post-release ==
=== Home media ===
==== DVD ====
- "The Movie: Doraemon Comes Back / Dorami-chan: Mini-Dora SOS!!! / The Doraemons: The Great Operating of Springing Insects! (DVD, Shogakukan, EAIN: 4988104028693, ASIN: B00MDJV8KW, April 1, 2005)
- "The Movie: Dorami-chan: Mini-Dora SOS!!! / The Doraemons: The Great Operating of Springing Insects! / Doraemon Comes Back [Doraemon the Movie 30th Anniversary Limited Edition]" (DVD, Shogakukan, November 3, 2010)
- "DORAEMON THE MOVIE BOX 1998-2004+TWO" (DVD, Shogakukan, September 3, 2012)

==== VHS ====
- "The Movie: Doraemon Comes Back / The Doraemons: The Great Operating of Springing Insects!" (VHS, Shogakukan, ASIN: B00005FTP0, March 1, 2000)

=== Streaming ===
In 2024, for the occasion of the 90th anniversary of Fujiko F. Fujio, remastered versions of Doraemon Comes Back alongside numerous animated short films of Doraemon, Perman, Esper Mami, and Chimpui were made available to stream on Prime Video Japan as the "Fujiko F. Fujio's 90th Anniversary Film Masterpiece Selection".

== See also ==
- List of Doraemon films
