= Kazuya Tatekabe =

Japanese actor (1934–2015)

- たてかべ 和也
- Born: Kazuya Tatekabe (立壁 和也); July 25, 1934; Kimobetsu, Hokkaido, Japan
- Died: June 18, 2015 (aged 80); Tokyo, Japan
- Other name: Kabe-san
- Occupations: Actor; voice actor; talent manager
- Agent: Kenyu Office (permanent affiliation)
- Notable credits: Doraemon as Takeshi "Gian" Gōda; Time Bokan as Warusa; Yatterman as Tonzura
- Website: Official profile

Kazuya Tatekabe (たてかべ和也, Tatekabe Kazuya; July 25, 1934 – June 18, 2015) was a Japanese actor, voice actor, and talent manager from Kimobetsu, Hokkaidō. He was represented by Kenyu Horiuchi's Kenyu Office until the time of his death.

Until 1977, he performed under his birth name Kazuya Tatekabe (立壁 和也, Tatekabe Kazuya).

He is most known for the roles of Takeshi "Gian" Gōda (Doraemon), Warusa (Time Bokan), and Tonzura (Yatterman).

== Biography ==
=== Early life ===
Tatekabe was born in Kimobetsu, Hokkaidō on July 25, 1934. His ancestors were pyrethrum farmers. His late father used to work for the Iburi Longitudinal Railway, but when he became too weak to continue working, the family moved to Shimokitazawa, Setagaya Ward, Tokyo, in 1942, when Tatekabe was in second grade. If they hadn't done so, he might have stuck in Hokkaidō. He once said, "I might have worked for an agricultural cooperative, gotten married, had grandchildren, watched Doraemon by the stove, and listened to the voice of Gian, who was probably played by someone else, and wondered, 'Who is that nasty voice?'" Tatekabe was born an only child, and as a young boy, he was similar to the character of Nobita, as he spoke with a slight Hokkaido accent and was a frequent victim of bullying throughout his childhood years.

During the war, while Tatekabe was in fourth grade elementary school, he was evacuated to Asama Onsen in the northeast of Matsumoto City, Nagano Prefecture, but was then evacuated again to Senba in Shiojiri City, Nagano Prefecture. He would wet his bed every night around that time, a habit that continued for six months close to the end of the war. Once he returned to his parents' home from the evacuation site, he was able to finally stop wetting his bed.

Every day when he returned home from Daizawa National School, now known as Daizawa Elementary School, in Setagaya Ward, Tokyo, he was absorbed in playing baseball, a passion that continued after entering Tokyo Agricultural Education College Junior High School.

=== Career ===
During high school, Tatekabe was asked to take part in the drama club's production of Alt Heidelberg as Dr. Jüttner, to which he was met with praise from audiences, leading him to believe that he had the talent to become an actor and that theater was interesting. However, he did not end up joining the drama club because he disliked being tied down to anything. Afterwards, he started to see plays all over Tokyo nearly every week. He was impressed by every play he saw and thought, "This is the only way I can live my life," and his desire of becoming an actor in the business grew stronger. However, Tatekabe was not particularly interested in acting. After graduating from high school, Tatekabe entered the Department of Theater Arts at the Nihon University College of Art. One of his university classmates and friends was Kiyoshi Kobayashi.

After Tatekabe graduated from high school, he wanted to join a professional theater company as soon as possible and become a trainee. However, when he saw his parents' faces, he could not bring himself to tell them. As an only child, he had previously thought that he would become a businessman someday and take care of his parents. He also did not like studying very much, and had the impression that he would be able to just have fun in the theater department, so he went to the university. Even after entering university, he did not study, but participated in many theater productions, including "The Bottom". Around this time, Tatekabe began to become interested in producing, and for a while focused on studying as a production staff member.

After Tatekabe graduated from the university, he went around applying to various broadcasting companies with hopes of becoming a television producer, but ended up failing at all of the job interviews he had to do in order to proceed. While working as a stagehand at Nippon Television, he teamed up with university classmate Yasuo Tanaka to form the theater company Engeki-za and performed "Poison and Old Lady" in Sapporo, Hokkaido. Kobayashi asked Tatekabe to join his Izumiza theater company, which Tatekabe agreed to it. The Izumiza theater company performed plays about the People's Republic of China, but most of the plays were ideological and were considered uninteresting. When Tatekabe was asked if he wanted to do it, he accepted before going on-stage.

After TV broadcasting began, Tatekabe officially began his career as a voice actor. His first voice acting roles were dubbing foreign films. He had no memory of the first dub he partook in, other than being told that it would be "profitable". Tatekabe's television drama debut was in Dial 110. Tatekabe was a member of the theater company Mitou, Tokyo Actor's Consumer's Cooperative Society and Ezaki Productions throughout his career.

He originally performed using under his real name Kazuya Tatekabe (立壁 和也), but after appearing in Time Bokan, he changed his name to Kazuya Tatekabe (たてかべ和也) so that children could easily understand it.

There was a slight misunderstanding between Tatekabe and his manager at the agency, and he initially thought it was a mismatch, but soon realized that there were other people around him who had similar doubts. Having decided to do it himself, in 1979, Tatekabe officially founded Office Chuo, serving as both its president and as a voice actor. He tried to sell everyone by acting as a manager, but in the end, he was the only popular one, so he had no desire to be actor and manager at the same time. He had no choice but to do it because of Time Bokan and Doraemon, though in reality he wanted to sell everyone. During his time at Office Chuo, he met Kenyu Horiuchi. The people who had been with him despite the opposition of the agency members said, "Let's keep going like this," because they had been working hard for five years. However, as pressure came on the agency, they realized that things would be hard if they went on as is, so they decided to merge in 1984 and absorbed into Production Baobab. After Horiuchi ended up leaving Baobab to establish Kenyu Office, Tatekabe also decided to leave with him in order to work for the same agency, serving as director.

=== Awards ===
In 2005, Tatekabe, along his Doraemon co-stars Nobuyo Ōyama, Noriko Ohara, Michiko Nomura, and Kaneta Kimotsuki, received the Rikiya Tayama Award at the 14th Japan Movie Critics Awards. In November 2006, they received the Special Award at the 11th Animation Kobe and in March 2007, they received the 3rd Lifetime Achievement Award at the Tokyo International Anime Fair.

=== Final years and death ===
In 2009, Tatekabe was diagnosed with gastric cancer and had to have his entire stomach removed. During his medical treatment, he was determined to complete his role as Tonzura in the Yatterman series, as before the cancer diagnosis, he never got a serious illness, therefore having never been hospitalized.

Tatekabe died from acute respiratory failure in Tokyo on June 18, 2015, at 80 years old. He was single all his life, and was said to have been attended by his relatives and staff at his agency during his final moments. After undergoing gastrectomy in 2009, he did not suffer from a recurrence of cancer, but his health declined until his final years, and he died of senility, with his final voice acting role being Max Tennyson in the Japanese version of Ben 10.

=== Tributes ===
A memorial caption for Tatekabe was shown at the beginning of the Doraemon anime episode broadcast on June 19, 2015.

Upon the announcement of Tatekabe's death, close family, fans, TV Asahi and former partner Horiuchi mourned his death, as well as his Doraemon successor Subaru Kimura, current Doraemon voice actress Wasabi Mizuta, Akira Kamiya, Shigeru Chiba, and Kazuhiko Inoue on social media, with the Fujiko F. Fujio Museum also sharing a memorial message in condolence.

Tatekabe's wake was held at the Aoyama Funeral Hall on June 23, and was attended by around 900 people, including Subaru Kimura, Wasabi Mizuta, Noriko Ohara, Michiko Nomura, Kaneta Kimotsuki, Keiko Yokozawa, Masako Nozawa, Mika Kanai, Koichi Yamadera, and Keiko Toda. Many voice actors and related parties sent flowers during the event.

At the wake, Horiuchi, as the funeral committee chairman, gave a speech for Tatekabe, and Kimotsuki gave a eulogy. Kimotsuki, a very close friend of Tatekabe, prayed for the Hanshin Tigers' victory for Tatekabe, as he was a Hanshin Tigers fan, saying, "Hanshin is in the running to win. I hope they win", and ended by crying out in Doraemon character Suneo's voice, "Gian, why did you go before me, even though you're Gian?".

Tatekabe's funeral was held on June 24 at the same location as the wake, being attended by around 600 people. Following the wake, Kimotsuki read a eulogy, expressing his gratitude by saying, "The 26 years of Doraemon have been really fun. It's all thanks to you, Kabe-san," and concluded by shouting "Gian!" as Suneo. Horiuchi, who served as the funeral committee chairman, also spoke out, stating on his official website, "I will never forget your teachings and will see you off without shedding a tear until the very end." At first, he tried to hold back his tears, but at the end, he cried out "Kabe-san, Kabe-san" to Tatekabe's portrait, his voice shaking, and tearfully expressed his gratitude, "He was the best teacher in Japan."

Inside his coffin, Tatekabe was wearing a Gian T-shirt with a microphone resembling Gian's recital mic, with many stuffed plushies of the character by his side. At the funeral procession, 80 balloons in the shape of white birds were released at the office's request and Tatekabe's body was cremated at Kirigaya Funeral Hall in Shinagawa Ward.

The funeral was organized by Kenyu Office, whom Tatekabe was affiliated up until his death.

Kenyu Office has kept Tatekabe's profile up after his death, treating him as a "permanently affiliated" employee of the company.

== Personality ==
As a voice actor, Tatekabe's most recognized voice acting roles were as Gorilla-Imo from The Gutsy Frog, Dotechin from Giatrus, Tonzura from Yatterman, Warusa from Time Bokan, and Takeshi "Gian" Gōda from Doraemon.

His voice range was baritone and he was known for playing tough, gorilla-like characters. Tatekabe himself stated that he enjoyed playing generally arrogant characters.

During his time with Haikyo, in addition to providing voice-over work, Tatekabe also did work as an actor and in radio voice over as minor roles without a credited name. His acting jobs for those often required him to stay tied for days despite scenes for him coming few and far between. However, the voice acting work he did never got cancelled, so Tatekabe felt that if he did minor roles, then voice acting was better off for his career.

In the Japanese dub of Ben 10, Tatekabe voiced the role of Max Tennyson. When he originally auditioned, the Japanese dub's production staff were very reluctant to hire Tatekabe for the role. However, when Tatekabe sent his audition over to the United States, the company asked him to be the voice of Max, and therefore he was chosen for the dubbing role.

His hobbies were watching baseball and reading, with his personal motto being "Cheerful, courageous, popular, and sometimes carefree".

=== Interpersonal relationships ===
While at Production Baobab, Tatekabe did not want the merger to fail. He was told, "I can't quit Doraemon, but you don't have to do any other work." He also worked as a manager and a senior managing director. With his position in the former, he was responsible for scouting and discovering voice acting talent such as Aki Uechi, Yuko Mizutani, Ai Orikasa, and Wasabi Mizuta, the voice actress of Doraemon since the 2005 series.

He arranged for Uechi to star in Idol Densetsu Eriko from her debut, and also arranged her to audition for the role of Shinnosuke in Crayon Shin-chan. He also had highly recommended Mizutani despite the fact that they were in different agencies at the time.

When a sound director had criticized actress Yūko Gotō, claiming she had an "evil voice", Tatekabe advised her, "The drawback of having a voice that stands out in a bad way can also become a weapon in anime. Poison can also be a medicine."

=== Gian in Doraemon ===
Tatekabe posing with an official Gian mascot costume for the release of Doraemon: Nobita in the Wan-Nyan Spacetime Odyssey in 2004.

In the Doraemon anime television series, Tatekabe famously voiced the character Takeshi Gōda, known by the nickname of "Gian", for 26 years from 1979 to 2005. When he was originally offered the role, Tatekabe had no idea what Doraemon was or who the character of Gian was, wondering, "What is Doraemon?" He had already been familiar with Obake no Q-Tarō, but he did not know about Fujiko Fujio much then.

When he was interviewed upon his departure from the role, Tatekabe said that playing the role of Gian required a lot of energy, as to prepare for recording, he smoked 20 cigarettes a day and drank alcohol six days a week. By late 2004, with his final recording scheduled to occur in about three months, Tatekabe reflected on his time, "I wonder how I'll feel on the last recording day, looking back on 26 years. I might even cry." He also expressed hope that the next voice actor for Gian would be "someone with a kind heart".

Tatekabe wanted to have a drink with the person who would take over the role of voicing Gian in the 2005 series, but was greatly disappointed when he found out that the selected successor for the role of Gian, Subaru Kimura, was 14 years old and a junior high school student at the time of casting. He hoped to live for another five years and then be able to drink with him. Kimura's high school happened to be close to the house Tatekabe lived at, so Tatekabe would often go to see Kimura whenever a school festival or an event was held during the wait. Tatekabe's wish eventually came true, as Kimura turned 20 years old in 2010 and they were able to go out drinking together, which became a trending topic online in Japan in 2014 when Kimura shared two photos from the time on Twitter.

According to Tsutomu Shibayama, director of the Doraemon anime television series and feature films from 1983 to 2005, "The voice actors have a deep understanding of the characters, so I don't have to say anything." Shibayama gave an example through Tatekabe with Gian, as he was extremely conscious of using foul language. Whenever lines like "You idiot!" or "Damn it" were written in the scripts, he would end up receiving complaints from Tatekabe about how "Gian wouldn't say such things." Tatekabe also wrote the lyrics for Gian's signature character song in the 1979 anime, "Ore wa Jaian-sama".

== Successors ==
With Tatekabe stepping down due to his advanced aging, the following other voice actors have taken over some of his roles.

Successor	Character	Work	Debut
Kōji Ishii	Big Hand	The Monster Kid	CR The Monster Kid: The Demon's Sword
Shinpachi Tsuji	Max Tennyson	Ben 10	Ben 10
Kenta Miyake	Strongman of the Villainous Trio	Time Bokan	CR Yatterman

== Filmography ==
=== Television animation ===
List of voice performances in television animation
Year	Title	Role	Notes	Source
1964	Wolf Boy Ken	Additional voice		
1964	Astro Boy	Additional voice		
1964	Big X	Additional voice		
1966	Kaizoku Ouji	Bud		
1967	The Golden Bat	Daleo		
1967	Thunder Boy Pikkari-B	Additional voice		
1968	The Monster Kid	Dr. Yes		
1968	Star of the Giants	Takashi Yoshida		
1968	Sabu to Ichi Torimono Hikae	Mamushi, Hachigoru, Genji, Ginji, Gonji, Rokusuke, Chief Denhachi, Daigoro, Suganoku, Yasuke, Ryutatsu, Genta, Gosuke, Fusazo, Kisuke, Tensen, Viper, Person		
1968	Fight Da!! Pyuta	Thief Cat, Tipster, Doctor		
1969	Umeboshi Denka	Additional voice		
1969	Judo Boy	Additional voice		
1969	Dororo	The Monster Donburibara		
1969	Ninpu Kamui Gaiden	Dodo, Ronin, Man, Peasant, Samurai, Sengoku, Roku, Jo, Ryu, Samurai, Magistrate, Village Chief, Ninja		
1969	The Genie Family	Gejigon		
1969	Moomin	Antlion, Octave, Coachman		
1970	Ashita no Joe	Additional voice		
1970	Attack No. 1	Additional voice		
1970	The Adventures of Hutch the Honeybee	Spider, Ninja Bug		
1970	Tiger Mask	Daigo Daimon / Mister Fudo, Hans Schleger, Leonard, Scarfy Rodziński, Seiji Sakaguchi		
1970	Norakuro	Additional voice		
1970	Bakuhatsu Taishō	Additional voice		
1971	Animentary: The Decision	Additional voice		
1971	Kunimatsu-sama no Otoridai	Kunisada Chūji, Kida, Shushō, additional voice		
1971	Golgo 13	Additional voice		
1971	Sazae-san	Anago-san	first voice	
1971	Wandering Sun	Additional voice		
1971	Tensai Bakabon	Additional voice		
1972	Science Ninja Team Gatchaman	Taichō, Kagakusha		
1972	Pinocchio: The Series	Charlie, Confectionery Shop, Peasant, Voice of the Tree, Seagull, Large Tree Evil Spirit, Soldier, additional voice		
1972	GeGeGe no Kitarō	Additional voice		
1972	The Gutsy Frog	Imotarō Gorira / Gorilla-Imo		
1973	Karate Master	Henchman, additional voice		
1973	Samurai Giants	Togashi, Audience		
1973	Jungle Kurobe	Additional voice		
1973	Casshan	Barashin, Robot A, DDH		
1973	Dororon Enma-kun	Additional voice		
1973	Little Wansa	Midori's Brother, Police Chief		
1974	Vicky the Viking	Hjalmar the Seal, additional voice		
1974	The Song of Tentomushi	Mr. Bear, Karabei		
1974	Tamageta-kun Next Door	Bulldog		
1974	First Human Giatrus	Dotechin		
1974	Hurricane Polymar	Baron (Danshaku)		
1974	Hoshi no Ko Chobin	Radar Bat		
1974	New Honeybee Hutch	Tentaro		
1974	Zero Tester	Bankichi		
1974	Kōya no Shōnen Isamu	Additional voice		
1975	Time Bokan	Warusa		
1975	Maya the Honey Bee	Guards, Bumblebee, Ant, Flower Spider, Spider, additional voice		
1975	Raideen	Thunders, Basutodon, Kōkatsu, Rēzaru, Sandāsu, Girumorā		
1976	Gowappa 5 Gōdam	Captain		
1976	Combattler V	Daisaku Nishikawa, Narua		
1976	Blocker Gundan 4 Machine Blaster	Goliath, Investigator A		
1976	Paul's Miraculous Adventure	Tornado Cactus, Subordinate, Spirit of the Snow, Paper Animal Dog, Pliers, Damper, Lion Knight		
1976	Manga Hana no Kakarichō	Additional voice		
1976	UFO Warrior Dai Apolon	Rikimaru		
1976	Robokko Beeton	Buriki		
1977	Attack on Tomorrow!	Arashi Sankichi		
1977	Arrow Emblem: Hawk of the Grand Prix	Hassan		
1977	Ikkyū-san	Additional voice		
1977	Ippatsu Kanta-kun	Tanuki, Koyama's father		
1977	Ganso Tensai Bakabon	Additional voice		
1977	New Star of Giants	Additional voice		
1977	Voltes V	Beast Warrior		
1977	Dokaben	Audience Member A		
1977	Tobidase! Machine Hiryū	President Gapporin		
1977	Yatterman	Tonzura		
1978	Nobody's Boy: Remi	Additional voice		
1978	Ikkyū-san	Kuro Kuro		
1978	Song of Baseball Enthusiasts	Sarumata, Kimata		
1978	Tōshō Daimos	Georiya		
1978	Haikara-San: Here Comes Miss Modern	Sentry, Subordinate		
1978	One Million-Year Trip: Bandar Book	Additional voice	Television film	
1978	The Adventures of the Little Prince	Additional voice		
1978	Invincible Steel Man Daitarn 3	Dobin		
1979	Galaxy Express 999	Gizorl	episode 53	
1979	New Star of the Giants II	Additional voice		
1979	Zenderman	Donjuro, Jūrō Donno		
1979	Gordian Warrior	Barubadasu		
1979	Doraemon	Takeshi "Gian" Gōda, Yasashi Gōda, Muku, Truck Driver, additional voice		
1979	Lupin the 3rd Part II	Benson Donkonjo Jr.	episode 128	
1980	The Monster Kid	Gang, Shishizō with Fresh Wounds, Acneen, Fly Man, One of the Piranha Boys, Kojira, Big Hand, Gerun, Gururun		
1980	Otasukeman	Dowarusuki		
1980	The New Adventures of Gigantor	Staff Officer, additional voice		
1980	Astro Boy	Shibugaki, Sultan's secretary		
1980	Muteking, The Dashing Warrior	Demon Bear, Hijacker A		
1980	Fumoon	Tabasco	Television film	
1980	Hoero! Bun Bun	Additional voice		
1981	Golden Warrior Gold Lightan	Ibaruda-Daiou, Mr. Mech X	Mr. Mech X appears in episode 50	
1981	Saikyo Robo Daioja 1	Warubada, Gouhara	Warubada appears in episode 19, Gouhara appears in episodes 40-41	
1981	Ninja Hattori-kun	Gorilla, Sumo Wrestler		
1981	Yattodetaman	Alan Sukadon, Tonzura, Photographer Koyama		
1982	Little Pollon	Helios		
1982	Ippatsuman	Kyokanchin, Kumagoro		
1982	Game Center Arashi	Monster	episode 14	
1982	Robby the Rascal	Kusaku, Nozoki, Matsuo Ikura		
1982	Dash Kappei	Judge		
1982	Tokimeki Tonight	Frankenstein		
1982	Ninjaman Ippei	Left Eye, Principal		
1982	Boku Patalliro!	Chief Chin		
1982	Magical Princess Minky Momo	Guard, Harry, Walbur, Number One, Neil, Surmetch, Gang A, Broker		
1983	Itadakiman	Tonmentan		
1983	Psycho Armor Govarian	Zeku Alba		
1983	Fuku-chan	The Driver		
1984	Special Armored Battalion Dorvack	Middle-aged Man, Bogotá		
1984	Creamy Mami, the Magic Angel	Former Actor		
1986	Doteraman	Whisky Oni	debuts in episode 4	
1988	Topo Gigio	Dracula the 102nd	episode 18	
1988	Mister Ajikko	Come On	Tatekabe also handling casting assistance	
1990	PEACH COMMAND: Shin Momotarō Densetsu	King Tatekabe		
1998	Ojarumaru	Chuntaro		
1999	The Legend of the End of the Era: Wonderful Tatsunoko Land - The Flying Saucer Alien UBO -	Tonzura		
2000	Time Bokan 2000: Kaitou Kiramekiman	Ondore, Tonzura, Walsa		
2001	Let's Go! Anpanman	Red Steel Horrorman	episode 612	
2002	The Twelve Kingdoms	Hō-Rōshi	episode 22	
2002	Hanada Shōnen Shi	Enkiri-dera no Osho-san		
2003	Cinderella Boy	Bob		
2003	Peacemaker Kurogane	Nakayama		
2003	Tank Knights Portriss	Pappalardi		
2004	Let's Go! The Farcical Three	Kotetsu Tsukioka	debuts in episode 11	
2005	Patalliro Saiyuki!	The Buddha		
2005	Monster	Old Man		
2005	Yakitate!! Japan	Schweinlinch		
2005	The Snow Queen	Thomas		
2006	Ergo Proxy	Empty Person		
2006	Ghost in the Shell: Stand Alone Complex - Solid State Society	Tonoda	Television film	
2006	Magikano	Aijan		
2006	Majime ni Fumajime Kaiketsu Zorori	Jackpot		
2008	Kimi ga Aruji de Shitsuji ga Ore de	De Niro		
2008	Glass Maiden	Homeless		
2008	Slayers Revolution	Council Member B		
2008	Yatterman	Tonzura, Alan Sukadon, Donjuro		
2008	RoboDz Kazagumo Hen	Boss Jellyfish		
2009	Nyan Koi!	Chatora		
2011	Fairy Tail	Roubaul		
2012	Ozuma	Roksanda Umai		
2015	I Can't Understand What My Husband Is Saying	A-ta		

=== Theatrical animation ===
List of voice performances in theatrical animation
Year	Title	Role	Notes	Source
1966	Jungle Emperor	Additional voice		
1967	The Golden Bat	Additional voice		
1971	Do It!! Yasuji's Pornorama	Additional voice		
1975	First Human Giatrus	Additional voice		
1976	Time Bokan	Additional voice		
1977	New Star of the Giants	Additional voice		
1979	Ganbare!! Tabuchi-kun!!	Additional voice		
1980	Doraemon: Nobita's Dinosaur	Takeshi "Gian" Gōda		
1980	Zenderman: The Mysterious Box of the Pyramid! Zenderman	Additional voice		
1980	Ganbare!! Tabuchi-kun!! 2nd Gekitō Pennant Race	Additional voice		
1980	Makoto-chan	Dry Cleaner's		
1980	Ganbare!! Tabuchi-kun!! Hatsu Warai 3rd Aa Tsuppari Jinsei	Additional voice		
1981	Doraemon: The Record of Nobita, Spaceblazer	Takeshi "Gian" Gōda		
1981	Time Patrol Team Otasukeman: Atasha's Wedding Reception!?	Dowarusuki		
1981	Doraemon: What Am I for Momotarō?	Takeshi "Gian" Gōda	Short film	
1982	Doraemon: Nobita and the Haunts of Evil	Takeshi "Gian" Gōda		
1983	Doraemon: Nobita and the Castle of the Undersea Devil	Takeshi "Gian" Gōda		
1984	Doraemon: Nobita's Great Adventure into the Underworld	Takeshi "Gian" Gōda		
1985	Doraemon: Nobita's Little Star Wars	Takeshi "Gian" Gōda		
1986	Doraemon: Nobita and the Steel Troops	Takeshi "Gian" Gōda		
1987	Doraemon: Nobita and the Knights on Dinosaurs	Takeshi "Gian" Gōda		
1988	Doraemon: The Record of Nobita's Parallel Visit to the West	Takeshi "Gian" Gōda		
1989	Doraemon: Nobita and the Birth of Japan	Takeshi "Gian" Gōda		
1989	Dorami-chan: Mini-Dora SOS!!!	Yasashiku "Giachibi" Gōda, Future Takeshi "Gian" Gōda	Short film	
1990	Doraemon: Nobita and the Animal Planet	Takeshi "Gian" Gōda		
1991	Doraemon: Nobita's Dorabian Nights	Takeshi "Gian" Gōda		
1991	Dorami-chan: Wow, The Kid Gang of Bandits!	Takezō	Short film	
1992	Doraemon: Nobita and the Kingdom of Clouds	Takeshi "Gian" Gōda		
1993	Doraemon: Nobita and the Tin Labyrinth	Takeshi "Gian" Gōda		
1994	Doraemon: Nobita's Three Visionary Swordsmen	Takeshi "Gian" Gōda, Gitos		
1995	Doraemon: Nobita's Diary of the Creation of the World	Takeshi "Gian" Gōda		
1995	2112: The Birth of Doraemon	Jaibee	Short film	
1996	Doraemon: Nobita and the Galaxy Super-express	Takeshi "Gian" Gōda		
1997	Doraemon: Nobita and the Spiral City	Takeshi "Gian" Gōda		
1998	Doraemon: Nobita's Great Adventure in the South Seas	Takeshi "Gian" Gōda		
1998	Doraemon Comes Back	Takeshi "Gian" Gōda	Short film	
1998	Galaxy Express 999: Eternal Fantasy	Easel's father		
1999	Doraemon: Nobita Drifts in the Universe	Takeshi "Gian" Gōda		
1999	Nobita's the Night Before a Wedding	Future Takeshi "Gian" Gōda	Short film	
2000	Doraemon: Nobita and the Legend of the Sun King	Takeshi "Gian" Gōda		
2000	A Grandmother's Recollections	Takeshi "Gian" Gōda	Short film	
2001	Doraemon: Nobita and the Winged Braves	Takeshi "Gian" Gōda		
2001	Good Luck! Gian!!	Takeshi "Gian" Gōda	Short film	
2001	Mōtto! Ojamajo Doremi: The Secret of the Frog Stone	Yuusuke Harukaze	Short film	
2002	Doraemon: Nobita in the Robot Kingdom	Takeshi "Gian" Gōda		
2002	The Day When I Was Born	Takeshi "Gian" Gōda	Short film	
2003	Doraemon: Nobita and the Windmasters	Takeshi "Gian" Gōda		
2004	Doraemon: Nobita in the Wan-Nyan Spacetime Odyssey	Takeshi "Gian" Gōda		
2005	Tsubasa Reservoir Chronicle the Movie: The Princess in the Birdcage Kingdom	Additional voice		
2006	Animal Forest: The Movie	Alan		
2009	Gekijō-ban Yattāman Shin Yattāmeka dai Shūgō! Omocha no Kuni de Daisakusenda Koron!	Tonzura		
2010	Duel Masters: Blazing Bonds XX!!	Diabolos Zeta, Annihilation Awakened	Final film role	

=== Original video animation (OVA) ===
List of voice performances in original video animation
Year	Title	Role	Notes	Source
1993–1994	Time Bokan: Royal Revival	Walther, Tonzura, Donjuro, Dowarusuki, Alan Sukadon, Kyokanchin, Tonmentan		
1999	Legend of the Galactic Heroes Gaiden: Spiral Labyrinth	Chan Tao		

=== Video games ===
- Gunbird (Valnus, Claude)
- Gunbird 2 (Valpiro, Blade)
- Tatsunoko vs. Capcom (Tonzura)
- Project X Zone (Drei Belanos)

=== Dubbing roles ===
==== Live-action ====
- Everybody Loves Raymond (Frank Barone: Peter Boyle)
- Frankenstein's Army (Robert Gwilym: Novikov)
- The Man from Hong Kong (Win Chan: Sammo Hung)
- Seed of Chucky (Pete Peters: John Waters)

==== Animation ====
- Alice in Wonderland (Carpenter)
- Ben 10 (Max Tennyson)
- Popeye's Voyage: The Quest for Pappy (Pappy)
- Wacky Races (Little Gruesome)

=== Television ===
- Robot Detective (Dennetsuman)
- Choujin Bibyun (Bagdard)

== Awards ==
Year	Award	Category	Result
2005	Japanese Movie Critics Awards	Rikiya Tayama Award	Won
2006	11th Animation Kobe	Special Award	Won
2007	Tokyo International Anime Fair 2007	3rd Achievement Award	Won
