= Doraemon: Nobita's Three Visionary Swordsmen =

1994 film by Tsutomu Shibayama

Doraemon the Movie: Nobita's Three Visionary Swordsmen
- Theatrical release poster

Japanese name
- Kanji: ドラえもん: のび太と夢幻三剣士
Transcriptions
- Revised Hepburn: Doraemon: Nobita to Mugen Sankenshi
- Directed by: Tsutomu Shibayama
- Screenplay by: Fujiko F. Fujio
- Based on: Doraemon's Long Tales: Noby's Phantastic Swordsmen by Fujiko F. Fujio
- Produced by: Sōichi Besshi
- Starring: Nobuyo Ōyama; Noriko Ohara; Michiko Nomura; Kaneta Kimotsuki; Kazuya Tatekabe
- Narrated by: Yousuke Akimoto
- Music by: Shunsuke Kikuchi
- Production company: Shin-Ei Animation
- Distributed by: Toho
- Release date: March 12, 1994 (Japan)
- Running time: 99 minutes (1h 39m)
- Country: Japan
- Language: Japanese
- Box office: $21.1 million

Doraemon: Nobita's Three Visionary Swordsmen (ドラえもん: のび太と夢幻三剣士, Doraemon: Nobita to Mugen Sankenshi) is a 1994 Japanese animated science fantasy film which premiered in Japan on March 12, 1994, based on the 14th volume of the same name of the Doraemon Long Stories series. This film marks the 15th anniversary of the Doraemon television series on TV Asahi. It's the 15th Doraemon film.

== Plot ==
The movie begins with Nobita in a dream but is interrupted by his mother telling him to wake up, Nobita asks for Doraemon to bring a Dream Machine, Doraemon disapproves and gives him a lecture which makes Nobita angry and he runs away from home. Doraemon then relents and gets him the machine which allows Nobita to dream of anything he wants. After an attempt to dream about the fall of Atlantis fails, he chooses a dream named The Three Musketeers after a version of Toriho in the real world convinces him to. At the start of the dream, he meets a fairy who brings him to a city in the Kingdom of Yumirume under the attack of Emperor Odrome's army. Enemies start firing at Nobitanian (Nobita), only to be saved by the fairy. She cuts off the piece of the moon, causing Nobitanian to fly away. When he gets up, he finds himself in the forest, and one of the swordsmen, namely Sunemith (Suneo), makes him his servant.

On the way, Nobitanian helps a baby bear to get out of the trap. While moving through the forest, Nobita is attacked by another swordsman Gitos (Gian). In order to save him, Sunemith fights with Gitos, which he loses and surrenders to him. Both of the swordsmen move to the inner forest in order to find the silver sword and suit. Both swordsmen climb over the sky-touching tree to get the sword, but Nobitanian luckily finds the blasted moon, and with its help, he reaches to the top of the tree and gets the sword. In this way, he becomes the silver swordsman. At the same time, Nobita's mother comes and wakes him. At school, he found that due to the dream Gian and Suneo are tired.

At night, Nobita asks Doraemon to add his friends to his dream. So he puts an antenna to the heads of his sleeping friends. When the dream starts, Nobita gets shocked to see Doramon (Doraemon) in his dream too. Now Gian and Suneo also become a part of his dream despite their wishes. All of them move in order to slay the dragon. Abruptly, they got attacked by a bear, only to be saved by the baby bear, who tells the bear that Nobitanian saved him from the trap. The bear promised the group to take them to the cave of the dragon.

On the other hand, princess Shizukaru (Shizuka) disagrees with her father's idea to marry the person who will defeat Emperor Odrome. After Shizuka becomes part of the dream, she runs away from the castle, rides over the break, which takes her away. Meanwhile, the bear leads the group to the cave to dragon, Gitos and Sunemith panic when they see people turned to stone. Suddenly the dragon awakens and turns them into stones with his fire breath, Nobitanian and Doramon get separated from the other two after nearly getting turned to stone themselves.

Nobita and Doraemon meet with Princess Shizukaru, all of them get covered in sand to disguise themselves. Doraemon suggests that in this form, the dragon can not identify them. So they move to the inner cave of the dragon. Nobita screamed seeing Gitos and Sunemith turned to stone. The dragon overhears it and attacks Nobitanian with his fire, but he protects himself with his sword. He cuts the dragon's mustaches with the sword, causing the dragon to faint. On the verge of killing it, he refuses due to having sympathy for it, the dragon then tells Nobitanian that he does not want to turn anyone to stone as he simply wants to protect himself. He lets them bathe in his sweat which will grant them one more life. He also let them return Gitos and Sunemith to normal

Then they move toward an attacked city. The city was empty except for army men. All of them plan to destroy the enemy's army by water as they were made of sand. So all of the army men get dissolved in water. Odrome gets furious at that and when a second attack fails to get rid of him. During the second attack, Toriho takes Doramon's pocket and presents it to Odrome. He then decides to fight with Nobitanian himself, he kills Nobitanian once, but before he can kill the rest of his friends, Nobita's mother wakes them up. Doraemon and Nobita then decide to return the Dream Machine after such an experience. Nobita removes the antenna from their other friends bar Shizuka, who was bathing.

Doraemon and Nobita decide to finish the dream once Shizukaria scolds them for not finishing it. This time they sneak into Odrome's castle and later Shizukaru joins and gets killed once. Nobitanian and Odrome start fighting each other but Nobitanian nearly gets defeated but is saved by Shizukaru using the Big Light and killing Odrome. The dream ends with princess Shizukaru agreeing to marry Nobita, but is interrupted by the machine being returned.

The film ends with Nobita and Shizuka going to school, remembering yesterday's dream, with Nobita running behind Shizuka when she tells him that he looked great in a dream she doesn't disclose to him.

== Cast ==
Character	Japanese voice actor
Doraemon / Doramon	Nobuyo Ōyama
Nobita Nobi / Nobitanian	Noriko Ohara
Shizuka Minamoto / Shizukaria / Shizukaru	Michiko Nomura
Suneo Honekawa / Sunemith	Kaneta Kimotsuki
Takeshi "Gian" Gōda / Gitos	Kazuya Tatekabe
Tamako Nobi	Sachiko Chijimatsu
Michiko Minamoto	Masako Matsubara
Sensei	Ryōichi Tanaka
Emperor Odrome	Iemasa Kayumi
Toriho	Kinto Tamura
General Spider	Yuusaku Yara
General Jumbo	Daisuke Gōri
Treasure Box	Ryoko Kinomiya
Monster	Masashi Hirose
General	Yōsuke Naka
Squad Leader	Minoru Inaba
Soldiers	Keiji Fujiwara; Hiroshi Naka; Hidetoshi Nakamura
Maid	Rio Natsuki
Schoolboy	Katsumi Toriumi
Dragon	Hiroya Ishimaru
Bear	Takuzou Kamiyama

== See also ==
- List of Doraemon films
