= First Human Giatrus =

Media franchise

- Giatrus

ギャートルズ (Gyātoruzu)
- Genre: Gag
- Manga
- Written by: Shunji Sonoyama
- Published by: Jitsugyo no Nihon Sha
- Magazine: Weekly Manga Sunday
- Original run: 1965 – 1975
- Manga

First Human Gon
- Written by: Shunji Sonoyama
- Illustrated by: Hideo Shinoda
- Published by: Gakken
- Magazine: Gakushū Magazine
- Published: 1966
- Manga
- Written by: Shunji Sonoyama
- Published by: Shogakukan
- Magazine: Gakunen Magazine
- Published: 1974
- Anime television series
- Music by: Hiroshi Kamayatsu; Mamoru Fujisawa
- Studio: A-Production; Tokyo Movie
- Original network: JNN (ABC, TBS) (until episode 26); ANN (ABC, NET) (episode 27 and after)
- Original run: October 5, 1974 – March 27, 1976
- Episodes: 77
- Anime film
- Music by: Hiroshi Kamayatsu; Joe Hisaishi
- Studio: Tokyo Movie
- Released: March 15, 1975
- Runtime: 14 minutes
- Television drama

Back to the Giatrus Days
- Written by: Hiroshi Shimokawa
- Music by: Toshiyuki Watanabe
- Original network: NHK BS-2
- Original run: April 18, 1993
- Episodes: 1
- Anime television series

Gon, The Stone Age Boy
- Directed by: Yutaka Kagawa
- Produced by: Yuji Nunokawa; Kyotaro Kimura; Ken Suekawa; Naoji Hōnokidani (Animation)
- Written by: Yoshio Urasawa
- Music by: Yusuke Honma
- Studio: Studio Pierrot
- Original network: NHK BS-2
- Original run: April 3, 1996 – January 22, 1997
- Episodes: 39

Giatrus (Japanese: ギャートルズ, Hepburn: Gyātoruzu) is a Japanese manga written and illustrated by Shunji Sonoyama. It spawned two other manga, two anime television series, a television drama, and an anime film. This TV series marked the debut of Joe Hisaishi, composer of My Neighbor Totoro and Spirited Away. The official English title is Gon, The Stone-Age Boy.

== Media ==
=== Manga ===
It was first published from 1965 to 1975 in Jitsugyo no Nihon Sha's Weekly Manga Sunday, and spawned two spin-off manga: the first, entitled First Human Gon (はじめ人間ゴン, Hajime Ningen Gon) and illustrated by Hideo Shinoda, was published in Gakken's Gakushū Magazine in 1966; the second, entitled First Human Giatrus (はじめ人間ギャートルズ, Hajime Ningen Gyatoruz), was published by Shogakukan's Gakunen Magazine in 1974.

Shunji Sonoyama won the 1976 Bungeishunjū Manga Award for his work on the manga series.

=== Anime series ===
The third manga was adapted by Tokyo Movie into a homonymous anime television series consisting in 77 episodes, which was broadcast on ABC between October 5, 1974, and March 27, 1976. Another anime was produced; this time Studio Pierrot adapted the second manga into a series directed by Yutaka Kagawa that originally ran from April 3, 1996, to January 22, 1997, in NHK-BS2.

==== Cast ====
First Human Giatrus

- Gon: Hiroko Maruyama
- Father: Kaneta Kimotsuki
- Mother: Keiko Hanagata
- Dotechin: Kazuya Tatekabe
- Piko-chan: Rihoko Yoshida

First Human Gon

- Gon: Ikue Ōtani
- Father: Kenichi Ogata
- Mather: Miyuki Ichijo
- Dotechin: Chafurin
- Piko-chan: Tomoko Kawakami
- Mammoth / Saber-tooth tiger: Kazuhiro Ōguro
- Shinigami: Kōji Ishii

=== Film ===
First Human Giatrus was adapted by Tokyo Movie into an anime film, which was released by Toho on March 15, 1975.

=== TV drama ===
The manga was adapted into a live-action Japanese television drama entitled Back to the Giatrus Days (バック・トゥ・ザ・ギャートルズ・デイズ, Bakku tou za Gyātoruzu Deizu). It was produced by Koji Matsuoka and starred Ryoko Takizawa, Katsuhisa Namase and Toshiya Sakai.

== Plot ==
During the stone age, Gon is a boy living with his parents and his friend, a gorilla named Dotechan. He goes out hunting for mammoths on the plains and always loves his girlfriend Piko. His father gets occasional seizures where he supposedly dies and three men come from heaven to pick him up, but Gon saves him everytime.
