= Masako Matsubara =

Japanese voice actress and narrator (born 1951)

- 松原 雅子
- Born: October 8, 1951 (age 75); Tokyo, Japan
- Occupations: Voice actress; narrator
- Years active: 1970–present
- Agent: Beat One
- Website: Official profile

Masako Matsubara (松原 雅子, Matsubara Masako; born October 8, 1951) is a Japanese voice actress.

== Biography ==
Matsubara was born on October 8, 1951 in Tokyo, Japan.

After stints at the TV Talent Center and K Production, she worked as a freelancer before joining Beat One.

== Personality ==
Her voice range is soprano.

From August 1981 to March 2005, Matsubara voiced Michiko Minamoto, the mother of main character Shizuka Minamoto, in the anime series Doraemon.

Matsubara has done narration for KM Ad System's 8-track cartridge bus announcement systems, with her voice becoming well known with bus enthusiasts.

Her personal hobbies and skills include Nordic crafts, porcelain painting, shamisen, traditional Japanese folk songs, the way of tea, and collecting children's stories.

Her favorite phrase is "Ichi-go ichi-e".

== Filmography ==
=== Television animation ===
List of voice performances in television animation
| Year | Title | Role(s) | Notes | Source |
|---|---|---|---|---|
| 1975 | Reideen the Brave | Yuka | | |
| 1975 | Tekkaman: The Space Knight | Chibi A | Ep. 10 | |
| 1977 | Chōgattai Majutsu Robo Ginguiser | Child A, Kitano, Iiko, Student, Yōko, Momoko, Kyoko, Kenta | Child A in Eps. 1, 3, and 4, Kitano in Ep. 2, Iiko in Ep. 5, Student in Ep. 6, Yōko in Ep. 8, Momoko in Ep. 12, Kyoko in Ep. 16, Kenta in Ep. 24 | |
| 1977 | Invincible Super Man Zambot 3 | Kaoru Kōzuki | Eps 4-5 | |
| 1978 | Gatchaman II | Boy B | Eps 34 and 36 | |
| 1978 | Haikara-San: Here Comes Miss Modern | Maid | Ep. 22 | |
| 1979 | Anne of Green Gables | Stella Maynard | | |
| 1980–1981 | Space Runaway Ideon | Mayaya Lau, Novak Ursula, Woman | Mayaya Lau in Eps 1–7 and 22, Novak Ursula in Eps 8–10, 29, and 37–38, Woman in Ep. 24 | |
| 1980 | Gatchaman Fighter | Refugee | Ep. 5 | |
| 1980 | Muteking, The Dashing Warrior | Kazuo Uchiyamada | | |
| 1981 | Fang of the Sun Dougram | Female Soldier | | |
| 1981 | Ninja Hattori-kun | Additional voice | | |
| 1981–2005 | Doraemon | Michiko Minamoto, Boy A | Second voice of Michiko Minamoto, Boy A in Ep. 786 | |
| 1982 | Game Center Arashi | Child C, Sumire Matsumoto | Child C in Ep. 6, Second voice of Sumire Matsumoto | |
| 1988 | City Hunter | Yuri Okano | Ep. 47 | |
| 1990 | 108 Ward Inside and Out: Make-Up Artist | Fukao | | |
| 1990 | The Laughing Salesman | Yumemi Koino | Ep. 20 | |
| 2005 | Black Jack | Schoolboy (Karte 23) | | |
| 2005 | Great Detective Conan | Eiko's mother | Eps. 419–420 | |

=== Theatrical animation ===
List of voice performances in theatrical animation
| Year | Title | Role | Notes | Source |
|---|---|---|---|---|
| 1981 | 21 Emon: Welcome to Space! | Announcer | | |
| 1982 | Space Runaway Ideon: A Contact | Mayaya | | |
| 1982 | Space Runaway Ideon: Be Ivoked | Ursula | | |
| 1983 | Doraemon: Nobita and the Castle of the Undersea Devil | Michiko Minamoto | | |
| 1985 | Doraemon: Nobita's Little Star Wars | Michiko Minamoto | | |
| 1990 | Doraemon: Nobita and the Animal Planet | Girl | | |
| 1991 | Doraemon: Nobita's Dorabian Nights | Michiko Minamoto | | |
| 1994 | Doraemon: Nobita's Three Visionary Swordsmen | Michiko Minamoto | | |
| 1995 | Doraemon: Nobita's Diary on the Creation of the World | Michiko Minamoto | | |
| 1999 | Nobita's the Night Before a Wedding | Michiko Minamoto | Short film | |
| 2002 | The Day When I Was Born | Michiko Minamoto | Short film | |

=== Original video animation (OVA) ===
List of voice performances in original video animation
| Year | Title | Role | Notes | Source |
|---|---|---|---|---|
| 1989 | Twin | Sumiko | Hyō's aunt | |
| 1990 | The Dark Myth | Take's mother | | |
