= Doraemon: Nobita and the Steel Troops =

1986 film by Tsutomu Shibayama

Doraemon the Movie: Nobita and the Steel Troops
- Theatrical release poster
- Directed by: Tsutomu Shibayama
- Screenplay by: Fujiko Fujio
- Based on: Doraemon's Long Stories: Nobita and the Steel Troops by Fujiko Fujio
- Produced by: Sōichi Besshi
- Starring: Nobuyo Ōyama; Noriko Ohara; Michiko Nomura; Kaneta Kimotsuki; Kazuya Tatekabe
- Music by: Shunsuke Kikuchi
- Production company: Shin-Ei Animation
- Distributed by: Toho
- Release date: March 15, 1986
- Running time: 97 minutes
- Country: Japan
- Language: Japanese
- Box office: $20.2 million

Doraemon: Nobita and the Steel Troops (ドラえもん のび太と鉄人兵団, Doraemon Nobita to Tetsujin Heidan) is a 1986 Japanese animated science fiction action-adventure film based on the seventh volume of the same name of the Doraemon Long Stories series. The original plot was written by Fujiko Fujio. Alternate titles include The Platoon of Iron Men, or The Robot Army. The film pays homage to many anime series featuring giant robots or "mecha", most notably Gundam and Mazinger. It is the seventh Doraemon film. In 2011, the film was remade as Doraemon: Nobita and the New Steel Troops—Winged Angels. The film is partly based on the 1980 chapter "Handmade Robot Rampage". An English dub was produced and released exclusively in Malaysia by Speedy Video as Doraemon - Nobita Tetsujinheiden.

== Plot ==
At the playground, Suneo shows off Micross, his new radio-controlled toy robot. Jealous, Nobita runs back home and begs Doraemon to build him a giant robot to upstage Suneo. Doraemon refuses and they argue, causing him to storm off to the North Pole using Anywhere Door. Nobita soon follows after him and stumbles upon a bowling ball-like mechanical orb that can summon parts for a giant robot.

After returning home with the orb, Nobita and Doraemon decide to build the robot in an uninhabited mirror world accessed by using Doraemon's Opposite World Entrance Oil on a surface of water. The completed robot seems to lack a brain, so Doraemon uses a psychic controller to allow them to pilot it. Meanwhile in the real world, Nobita's mother accidentally trips on the orb and locks it in a shed.

Nobita invites Shizuka to play with them, Doraemon names the robot "Zanda Cross" after Santa Claus since it was found at the North Pole during their time with her. When Shizuka is given the psychic controller to pilot it, she accidentally fires lasers at a skyscraper, utterly destroying it. The group becomes devastated when they realize that Zanda Cross is actually a weapon of war. Realizing what could've happened if they were in the real world, they abandon both the robot and the mirror world, and vow never to speak of them again.

Meanwhile, a mysterious scantily-clad girl is tracking Zanda Cross at the North Pole. Her search leads her to Japan and to Nobita. She reveals that her name is Lilulu and she is the true owner of the robot, who she calls Judo. Nobita reluctantly leads her to the robot's location in the mirror world and hands her the psychic controller. Lilulu offers to forgive Nobita for the theft if she can use the mirror world, but makes Nobita promise to keep this a secret.

That night, Nobita investigates the mirror world to find Lilulu leading a group of robots in building a large facility. Nobita also finds Doraemon following him due to his recent despondent behavior. Nobita reveals what happened between him and Lilulu, as well as his suspicion that she may be an alien. The two learn that the robots are preparing for an invasion of Earth so they escape back into the real world. Lilulu and Zanda Cross pursue them, but Zanda Cross is too big to fit through the portal and ends up destroying it catastrophically, trapping the robots in the mirror world. Nobita and Doraemon rejoice believing that the Earth has been saved.

The next day, Doraemon discovers the orb beeping incessantly. Using his Translation Jelly to allow the orb to speak, he discovers that the orb is in fact Judo, the mechanical brain meant to pilot Zanda Cross. Judo further reveals that it has already signalled the rest of the robot army to commence their invasion of Earth.

No adults believe Doraemon or Nobita's story, so they recruit Suneo, Gian, and Micross (who Doraemon has given sentience and the ability to talk) to stop the invasion. They reprogram Judo with Zanda Cross so it can be their ally, they then use the World Entrance Oil on Shizuka's bathtub to create another entrance to the mirror world. Shizuka also ends up in the mirror world and finds an injured Lilulu, who is revealed to be an android but Lilulu attempts to kill Shizuka once she found out before being knocked out by Micross.

Shizuka tends to Lilulu as she doesn't believe the android to be bad at heart. Lilulu shares the history of her home planet Mechatopia, explaining how robots were created by God after he gave up on humanity. Robots initially enslaved each other until a revolution led to robot freedom. So as a compromise, the robots decided to invade Earth and enslave humanity instead. Shizuka remarks how this is similar to the violent history of humanity and that God would be displeased, causing Lilulu to angrily attack her before passing out from her own injuries.

Meanwhile, Nobita and friends hatch a plan to use Zanda Cross's signal to lure the robot army into the mirror world using the mountain lake as the entrance. The army immediately attacks major cities across the world upon arriving, but can find no signs of actual people. Lilulu manages to escape and meet with the army's leader, but she does not reveal the truth about the mirror world. Instead, she pleads with them to end the invasion, claiming that humanity is just like them and should not be enslaved. Enraged, the robot leader sentences Lilulu to death, but she is freed by Nobita and Doraemon.

The robots eventually discover the ruse when they realize the entire planet is backwards. They rendezvous at the lake entrance to return to the real world, but Nobita and friends are already waiting there to battle them. Meanwhile, Shizuka, Lilulu, and Micross, who had stayed behind decide to use Doraemon's time machine to travel back in time to ancient Mechatopia so they can plead with God to change the robots. They meet with "God", an elderly man who appears to be the scientist who created the very first robots Amu and Imu, the predecessos of the robots that exist today. He agrees to reprogram the two progenitor robots Amu and Imu so that Mechatopia's history will be rewritten. But he is too frail to finish the process so Lilulu does so instead, despite being aware that doing so will erase her existence as well.

Back in the present, the robots are on the verge of defeating Nobita and gang when they suddenly start disappearing. Back in ancient Mechatopia, Lilulu also begins disappearing and shares a final handshake with Shizuka before she is erased completely. A heartbroken Shizuka along with Micross rejoin their friends in the present and tells them about Lilulu's end.

Some time later, Nobita is being left after school and wonders what has become of Mechatopia. Suddenly, he sees Lilulu flying outside the window. As the end credits begin, he runs out to tell the rest of his friends and exclaims that Lilulu has become an angel, though they don't believe him. As the end credits continue, Lilulu flies into space, giving the Earth a goodbye wave before continuing on.

== Cast ==
Character	Japanese voice actor
Doraemon	Nobuyo Ōyama
Nobita Nobi	Noriko Ohara
Shizuka Minamoto	Michiko Nomura
Takeshi "Gian" Gōda	Kazuya Tatekabe
Suneo Honekawa	Kaneta Kimotsuki
Lilulu	Yuriko Yamamoto
Micross	Yuji Mitsuya
Professor	Kazuo Kumakura
Judo	Osamu Katō
Robot Squad Leader	Yasurō Tanaka
Robot Soldiers	Masashi Hirose; Koichi Hashimoto
Tamako Nobi	Sachiko Chijimatsu
Nobisuke Nobi	Masayuki Katō
Sensei	Ryōichi Tanaka
Mrs. Gōda	Kazuyo Aoki
Mrs. Honekawa	Yoshino Ohtori

== Design issues ==
Mecha fans thought the mecha was similar to the MSN-100 Hyaku Shiki from Yoshiyuki Tomino's Mobile Suit Z Gundam, thinking that the mechanical designer was Kunio Okawara. However this was proven false as the true mecha designer was manga artist Takaya Kenji.

== See also ==
- List of Doraemon films
