= Doraemon: Nobita Drifts in the Universe =

1999 film by Tsutomu Shibayama

Doraemon the Movie: Nobita Drifts in the Universe
- Theatrical release poster
- Directed by: Tsutomu Shibayama
- Screenplay by: Nobuaki Kishima
- Based on: Doraemon by Fujiko F. Fujio
- Starring: Nobuyo Ōyama; Noriko Ohara; Michiko Nomura; Kaneta Kimotsuki; Kazuya Tatekabe; Fuyumi Shiraishi; Masako Nozawa; Mayumi Shō; Tesshō Genda; Kinryū Arimoto; Kenji Utsumi
- Music by: Senri Oe
- Production company: Shin-Ei Animation
- Distributed by: Toho
- Release date: 6 March 1999 (Japan)
- Running time: 93 minutes
- Country: Japan
- Language: Japanese
- Box office: $31.2 million

Doraemon: Nobita Drifts in the Universe (ドラえもん のび太の宇宙漂流記, Doraemon: Nobita no Uchū Hyōryūki) is the 1999 Japanese animated epic space opera film. It is the second Doraemon film released after Fujiko F. Fujio's death. This is the third movie to be supervised by Fujiko Pro. This movie commemorates the 20th anniversary of the Doraemon film series during its end credits showcasing a piece of artwork of it and all films released prior. It was released on March 6, 1999, together with Doraemon: Nobita's the Night Before a Wedding and Funny Candy of Okashinana!?. It is the 20th Doraemon film.

== Plot ==
The film starts with Doraemon along with his other friends play a game which he has brought from the future. They all try to race but Gian and Suneo shoot everyone else down, returning Nobita, Doraemon, and Shizuka back to Nobita's room. While waiting for them to finish, Nobita asks Doraemon for another gadget, the Gravity Modifier, making the entire room have no gravitational pull. However, this gets destroyed shortly after leading to the space game getting thrown out from the room, leaving Gian and Suneo stuck inside.

When the group cleans up, they find out the game had been thrown by Nobita's mother, which is gone by the time they reach the dump. Using the Time Camera, Doraemon sees a strange light carrying the game where it disappears into a spaceship. At that place where it departs, they found a strange, glowing rock. Doraemon, Nobita, and Shizuka then use the Space Exploration Boat to chase the spaceship.

The group catches up to the spaceship during a wormhole storm, which is severe enough for them to evacuate the Exploration Boat. They enter the spaceship using the Pass Loop and find Gian and Suneo then attempt to leave. Suddenly, the crew of the spaceship confronts the group, saying they're the owner of the spaceship and locks them in the room from earlier.

The spaceship soon encounters problems and has to land on a planet, Doraemon and the others escape the room they're locked in, finding themselves in a rocky and barren planet inhabited by giant metallic spiders. The group evade them, but the spiders trap the spaceship in their web. Deciding to help the spaceship and its crew, Doraemon had Gian blow an enlarged Hamelin Pipe to make the spiders run and help clear the webs on the spaceship.

Once they realize Doraemon's group is friendly, the people on the spaceship introduce themselves as Lian, Log, Freya and Gorogoro. They are on their way back to their mothership where they live after a mission to find a habitable planet with no inhabitants to settle in. They agree to take Doraemon and the others back to earth after they arrive to their mothership to fix their warp device. But their ship begins to break down again, leading to them trying to land on a foggy planet, the ship then crashes and everyone is knocked out.

Nobita and the others are the first to "get up" and think they landed back on Earth. However, seemingly unexpected things happen. Suddenly, Nobita wakes up from the glowing stone pricking him, then realizes the place is a barren wasteland with giant tree monsters. After waking up Doraemon, they realized they are dreaming and he quickly uses the Faraway Wake Up Clock to snap the others awake, Lian's group then rescue everyone despite some trouble with the ship's door and leave the planet.

On their way, the ship crosses on a space field littered by debris, suddenly many 'live meteors' attach themselves to their ship and drain most of its energy. They are saved by a missile out of nowhere, but get brought to a secret base, where they meet Liebert, who turns out to be Lian's father, and Angolmois, an evil cloaked figure who wishes to conquer Earth. It turns out that Freya was a spy and everyone else gets imprisoned.

With the Underground Submarine, Doraemon and the group escapes and made a run for Lian's spaceship. Despite them trying to hold back Angolmois's robot soldiers, they nearly didn't make it until Freya grabs one of the guns and shoots a soldier. Freya hesitates to join but enters when Lian tells her to do so, everyone then forgives her.

Just as Lian's spaceship break down again, they finally reached their mothership. The leader of the ship, along with their council, discuss what to do with Angolmois's menace towards them, and they decided to ask their 'god', a giant glowing tree that is capable of doing special things. Nobita also realizes that the glowing rock he found back on earth is one of the tree's 'seed' that Lian accidentally dropped. Lian prays to it and a projection of his deceased mother appears who tells him to save his father from Angolmois who controls him and the space army.

Using the spaceship from their game, Doraemon, Nobita, Shizuka, Gian, and Suneo joins Lian and several more spaceships to repel Angolmois's fleet. They are on the back foot until Freya points out a control rod that controls all the enemy spacecraft. Doraemon, Nobita, Lian and Freya land on the base and uses Nendoron to turn the control rod to clay, disabling all Angolmois's spacecraft. With his fleet lost, Angolmois reveals his base to be a spaceship, unknowingly taking Doraemon's group also. They enter the spacecraft to confront Angolmois and orders Liebert to shoot them. Before he can do so, Liebert snaps out of Angolmois's control, and shoots him instead and reveals him to be a robot.

However, the spaceship is on a crash course on with the mothership. Despite the initial panic, Nobita, Doraemon, Gian, and Suneo ties the Reverse Cloak to their spaceship and shine it with the Big Light. The cloak is big enough to deflect the mothership away from the planet, saving it. Just as they celebrate, Angolmois who assembled a new body out of garbage chases the group run away but gets stuck on a door, and has to revert to his gooey form. Doraemon freezes him with the Coagulation Light and sends him into a black hole.

The inhabitants of the mothership then celebrate Angolmois's defeat and Lian's group returns Doraemon and his friends home while Lian promises to find another planet where they can live on.

The film ends with a repeat of the fog planet scene but with the results being more expected.

== Cast ==
Character	Japanese voice actor
Doraemon	Nobuyo Ōyama
Nobita Nobi	Noriko Ohara
Shizuka Minamoto	Michiko Nomura
Takeshi "Gian" Gōda	Kazuya Tatekabe
Suneo Honekawa	Kaneta Kimotsuki
Lian	Fuyumi Shiraishi
Log	Masako Nozawa
Freya	Mayumi Shō
Gorogoro	Tesshō Genda
Commander Liebert	Kinryū Arimoto
Angolmois	Kenji Utsumi
Rebel soldier	Tōru Ōkawa
Lian's Mother	Miki Itō
Mazura	Takeshi Watabe
ATC	Toshihiko Nakajima
Cadre	Masashi Hirose
Councilors	Masashi Sugawara; Chafurin; Keisuke
Boys	Yasuhiro Takato; Kōichi Tōchika
Tamako Nobi	Sachiko Chijimatsu
Nobisuke Nobi	Yōsuke Naka
Sensei	Ryōichi Tanaka

== Soundtrack ==
=== Theme songs ===
"Doraemon no Uta" (ドラえもんのうた)
Lyrics: Takumi Kusube / Composition: Shunsuke Kikuchi / Arrangement: Shunsuke Kikuchi / Vocals: Satoko Yamano
"Kisetsu Ga Iku Toki" (季節がいく時)
Lyrics: Hiromasa Ijichi / Composition: Hiromasa Ijichi / Arrangement: Yasutaka Mizushima / Vocals: Speed

=== Other songs ===
"Pocket no Naka Ni" (ポケットの中に)
Lyrics: Tetsuya Takeda / Composition: Shunsuke Kikuchi / Arrangement: Shunsuke Kikuchi / Vocals: Doraemon (Nobuyo Ōyama), Nobita (Noriko Ohara), Shizuka (Michiko Nomura), Suneo (Kaneta Kimotsuki), Gian (Kazuya Tatekabe)

== See also ==
- List of Doraemon films
