= Ryōichi Tanaka =

Japanese voice actor (born 1947)

- 田中 亮一
- Born: January 26, 1947 (age 79); Suginami, Tokyo, Japan
- Occupations: Actor; voice actor; narrator
- Years active: 1970–present
- Agent: Aoni Production
- Relatives: Kazumi Tanaka
- Website: Official profile

Ryōichi Tanaka (田中 亮一, Tanaka Ryōichi; born January 26, 1947) is a Japanese actor and narrator affiliated with Aoni Production.

He is most well known for the roles of Akira Fudo in Devilman, Nobita's teacher Sensei in Doraemon, and Cancer Deathmask in Saint Seiya.

== Biography ==
Born January 26, 1947, in Suginami, Tokyo, Japan, Tanaka loved to perform for people ever since he was a child and always volunteered for roles whenever a play was put on for the school arts festival in third grade. He volunteered to pursue a career as an actor despite having a naturally reserved personality.

After he graduated from the Department of Drama at Tama Art University, he joined the Gekidan Geikyo theater company with his younger brother and engaged in theatrical activities, making his theatrical debut in The Fox, written by Yoshiteru Kurokawa.

After the death of the representative of Gekidan Geikyo, Takeshi Aono, Tanaka served as the representative until the theater company disbanded in 2013.

When Tanaka began his acting career, screen actors were considered the true professionals, while voice acting was viewed as a low-tier job. Due to a lack of domestic programming, there was high demand for dubbing, prompting many young actors in their 30s to switch to voice acting. Tanaka, only around 20 at the time, was encouraged to pursue voice work for his ability to produce a child's voice. He struggled initially but eventually developed a mature voice as he aged.

In 1970, he made his anime debut and first lead role in Akakichi no Eleven voicing the main protagonist Shingo Tamai.

He was previously affiliated with Ezaki Productions and Office Oh.

== Filmography ==
=== Television animation ===
List of voice performances in television animation
Year	Title	Role(s)	Notes	Source
1970	Akakichi no Eleven	Shingo Tamai	Anime voice role debut	
1970	Tiger Mask	Kentaro Takaoka/Yellow Devil		
1972	Devilman	Akira Fudo		
1973	Cutie Honey	Johnny	Ep. 19	
1976	Dokaben	Fumio Ataru, Ohkawa		
1977	UFO Robo Grendizer	Zuril Junior		
1981–2005	Doraemon	Sensei	Fourth voice	
1981	Fang of the Sun Dougram	Rocky Andor		
1983	Kinnikuman	Warsman (First), Jesse Maivia, Mister Khamen		
1983	Lightspeed Electroid Albegas	Kurohara		
1983	Nine 2: Sweetheart Declaration	Morio		
1986	Ginga: Nagareboshi Gin	Kurotora, Hakuro		
1986	Saint Seiya	Cancer Deathmask, Musca Dio		
1987	Transformers: The Headmasters	Brainstorm		
1987	Hokuto no Ken 2	Jo		
1988	Transformers: Super-God Masterforce	Lander		
1988	Kiteretsu Daihyakka	Shintaro		
1988	Himitsu no Akko-chan	Tetsu		
1988	Sakigake!! Otokojuku	Rankiryuu (Hikoubou		
1989	Transformers: Victory	Blue Bacchus		
1990	Chibi Maruko-chan	Headmaster		
1991	Kinnikuman: Scramble for the Throne	Prisman		
1993	Aoki Densetsu Shoot!	Ohmmori		
1996	Kochira Katsushika-ku Kameari Koen-mae Hashutsujo	Daidiro Ohara		
1999	One Piece	Moore, Minister of the Left		
2000	Vandread	Prime Minister		
2004	Koi Kaze	Zenzo Saeki		
2008	Porphy no Nagai Tabi	Thomas (Second generation voice actor)	After his younger brother Kazumi—who was originally in charge—passed away, Ryoichi took over the role	
2015	Saint Seiya: Soul of Gold	Cancer Deathmask		
2016	Tiger Mask W	Kentaro Takaoka		
2021	Hanma Baki - Son of Ogre	Prison Warden		

=== Theatrical animation ===
List of voice performances in theatrical animation
Year	Title	Role	Notes	Source
1971	Do It! Yasuji's Pornorama	Additional voice		
1973	Mazinger Z vs. Devilman	Akira Fudo		
1974	Mazinger Z vs. The Great General of Darkness	Tetsuya Tsurugi		
1983	Dougram	Rocky		
1984	Doraemon: Nobita's Great Adventure into the Underworld	Sensei		
1985	The Dagger of Kamui	Jackal		
1986	Doraemon: Nobita and the Steel Troops	Sensei		
1987	Dragon Ball: Sleeping Princess in Devil's Castle	Demon		
1988	Doraemon: The Record of Nobita's Parallel Visit to the West	Sensei		
1989	Doraemon: Nobita and the Birth of Japan	Sensei		
1990	Doraemon: Nobita and the Animal Planet	Doctor		
1991	Doraemon: Nobita's Dorabian Nights	Merchant		
1992	Doraemon: Nobita and the Kingdom of Clouds	Sensei		
1993	Doraemon: Nobita and the Tin Labyrinth	Sensei		
1994	Doraemon: Nobita's Three Visionary Swordsmen	Sensei		
1995	Doraemon: Nobita's Diary of the Creation of the World	Sensei		
1995	2112: The Birth of Doraemon	Strict Robot Teacher	Short film	
1996	Doraemon: Nobita and the Galaxy Super-express	Curator		
1999	Doraemon: Nobita Drifts in the Universe	Sensei		
1999	Nobita's the Night Before a Wedding	Sensei	Short film	
2000	Doraemon: Nobita and the Legend of the Sun King	Sensei		
2013	Dragon Ball Z: Battle of Gods	Old Kaioushin		
2015	Dragon Ball Z: Resurrection 'F'	Dr. Briefs		

=== Original video animation (OVA) ===
List of voice performances in original video animation
Year	Title	Role	Notes	Source
1989	Legend of the Galactic Heroes	Hans Eduard Bergengrun		
1993	Kamen Rider SD	Kamen Rider V3		

=== Tokusatsu ===
List of performances in tokusatsu
Year	Title	Role	Notes	Source
1973	Ike! Greenman	Demon Lord		
1974	Ike! Ushiwaka Kotarou	Kotaro Ushikawa		
1996	Ultraman Tiga	Gobunyu (Vaha)	Ep. 19	
2000	Mirai Sentai Timeranger	Counselor Zektar	Ep. 31	
2001	Hyakuju Sentai Gaoranger	Shrine Bell Org	Ep. 4	
2001	Kamen Rider Agito	Crab Lord/Crustata Palleo	Eps. 30-31	
2002	Ninpuu Sentai Hurricanger	Nightmare Ninja Yumebakushi	Ep. 11	
2004	Tokusou Sentai Dekaranger	Tenkaolien Raja Namunan	Ep. 35	

=== Video games ===
List of voice performances in video games
Year	Title	Role	Notes	Source
2001	Summon Night 2	Frip		
2003	Mega Man X: Command Mission	Colonel Redips		
2006	Dragon Ball Z: Tenkaichi 2	Ghost		
2006	Kinnikuman Muscle Grand Prix MAX	Mister Khamen		
2008	Kinnikuman Muscle Grand Prix 2	Mister Khamen		
2011	Dragon Ball Z: Ultimate Tenkaichi	Old Supreme Kai		
2013	Saint Seiya: Brave Soldiers	Cancer Deathmask		

=== Dubbing ===
==== Live-action ====
List of dub performances in live-action productions
Title	Role	Notes	Source
Aliens	Private William Hudson (Bill Paxton)	1989 TV Asahi edition	
An Officer and a Gentleman	Della Serra(Tony Plana)		
Chances Are	Richard (Marc McClure)		
Commando	Sully (David Patrick Kelly)	1989 TV Asahi edition	
Crimson Tide	Chief of the Boat Cobb (George Dzundza)	2000 TV Asahi edition	
JFK	Lee Harvey Oswald (Gary Oldman)	1994 TV Asahi edition	
The Monuments Men	Pvt. Preston Savitz (Bob Balaban)		
National Lampoon's Animal House	Lawrence "Pinto" Kroger (Tom Hulce)	1983 TV Asahi edition	
An Officer and a Gentleman	Emiliano Della Serra (Tony Plana)	1986 Fuji TV edition	
The Omega Man	Richie (Eric Laneuville)		
Platoon	Francis (Corey Glover)	1989 TV Asahi edition	
Red Heat	Salim (J.W. Smith)		
Taps	Cadet Major Brian Moreland (Timothy Hutton)		
Time Bandits	Vermin (Tiny Ross)		
Total Recall	Benny (Mel Johnson Jr.)		

==== Animation ====
List of dub performances in animation productions
Title	Role	Notes	Source
G.I. Joe: A Real American Hero	Cobra Commander		
SWAT Kats: The Radical Squadron	Jake Clawson/Razor		
Thomas and Friends	Duncan, Bulstrode, Byron, The Vicar (Season 3 only), Cyril, Additional voices	Seasons 1–7	
The Transformers	Cobra Commander		
PB&J Otter	Mayor Jeff		
Peanuts	Schroeder		
Babar	Zephir		

=== Japanese Voice-Over ===
- Peter Pan's Flight (Pirates Gordon)
