= Akira Kume =

Japanese actor (1924–2020)

- 久米 明
- Born: February 8, 1924; Tokyo Prefecture, Japan
- Died: April 23, 2020 (aged 96); Tokyo, Japan
- Occupations: Actor; voice actor; narrator
- Years active: 1947–2019
- Children: Shusaku Kume; Daisaku Kume; Nanako Kume

Akira Kume (久米 明, Kume Akira; February 8, 1924 – April 23, 2020) was a Japanese actor, voice actor, and narrator.

As of 2019, with his role as the narrator of the NHK show Tsurube's Salute to Families, he was the world's oldest active voice actor.

== Biography ==
Kume was born in Tokyo Prefecture, Japan on February 8, 1924.

He graduated from Azabu Junior High School under their older school system and Tokyo University of Commerce, now known as Hitotsubashi University. Tadashi Nagai, the former president of Mitsui Home, was his classmate in junior high and college. People such as Masaru Hayami were his classmates in the university's preparatory program.

After experiencing the end of World War II as a student soldier and returning to university, he was deeply moved by the Haiyuza Theatre Company's production of Nikolai Gogol's The Government Inspector and decided to found a drama research group. In 1947, he co-founded the "Budou no Kai" theater troupe with Junji Kinoshita, Yasue Yamamoto, and other people.

He was appointed lecturer at the College of Art, Nihon University in 1972, and professor at the same university in 1975. In 1992, he received the Medal with Purple Ribbon, and received the Order of the Rising Sun, 4th Class, Gold Rays with Rosette in 1997.

In 2019, he officially retired from narration work and moved into a Tokyo nursing home.

=== Death ===
Kume died from heart failure on April 23, 2020, at the age of 96.

== Personal life ==
He was the father of Daisaku Kume, who married Saki Kubota in 1985.

== Filmography ==
=== Films ===
- The Insect Woman (1963) - Investigator
- Tora! Tora! Tora! (1970) - First Secretary Katsuzo Okumura (uncredited)
- Karafuto 1945 Summer Hyosetsu no Mon (1974) - Watabe
- Kinkanshoku (1975) - Prime Minister
- Tora-san's Sunrise and Sunset (1976) - Mayor of Tatsuno
- Yojōhan seishun garasu-bari (1976) - Detective
- Fumō Chitai (1976) - Cabinet minister
- Female Teacher (1977) - Kamino / Schoolmaster
- Kitamura Toukoku: Waga fuyu no uta (1977)
- The Resurrection of the Golden Wolf (1979) - Hyōgo
- Dōran (1980) - Kinzo Mizoguchi
- Shag (1989)
- Graduation Journey: I Came from Japan (1993) - Narrator
- Pipi to benai hotaru (1996) - Elder Stag

=== Television dramas ===
- Key Hunter (1968) - Killer Ueno
- Kunitori Monogatari (1973) - Akechi Mitsuyasu
- Taiyō ni Hoero! (1978–1979) - Soda
- Oretachi wa Tenshi da! (1979), Episode #1 - Funashima
- Kusa Moeru (1979) - Itō Sukechika
- Kinpachi-sensei (1981) - Ōyama
- Shadow Warriors (1981) - Tokugawa Mitsukuni
- Ōoka Echizen (1983) - Old man
- Tokugawa Ieyasu (1983) - Katagiri Katsumoto
- Choshichiro Edo Nikki (1983) - Amemiya
- Musashibō Benkei (1986) - Minamoto no Yorimasa
- Edo o Kiru (1987) - Matsudaira Izuminokami
- Hachidai Shōgun Yoshimune (1995) - Ōkubo Tadatomo

=== Stage ===
- Death of a Salesman
- The Lower Depths
- The Merchant of Venice
- The Tempest

=== Television animation ===
- Botchan (1980) - Narrator
- In the Beginning: The Bible Stories (1992) - Narrator
- Phoenix (2004) - Narrator

=== Theatrical animation ===
- Space Adventure Cobra: The Movie (1982) - Professor Toporo
- Crusher Joe (1983) - Dan
- Penguin's Memory - Shiawase Monogatari (1985) - The Librarian
- Nobita's the Night Before a Wedding (short film) (1999) - Yoshio Minamoto (Shizuka's father)

=== Video games ===
- The Legend of Dragoon (1999) - Dewey

=== Dubbing ===
==== Live-action ====
- Humphrey Bogart
  - Angels with Dirty Faces (Jim Frazier)
  - The Roaring Twenties (George Hally)
  - The Maltese Falcon (Sam Spade)
  - Casablanca (1967 TV Asahi edition) (Rick Blaine)
  - Action in the North Atlantic (First Officer Joe Rossi)
  - Sahara (Sergeant Joe Gunn)
  - To Have and Have Not (Harry "Steve" Morgan)
  - The Big Sleep (Philip Marlowe)
  - Key Largo (1967 TV Asahi edition) (Maj. Frank McCloud)
  - The Treasure of the Sierra Madre (Fred C. Dobbs)
  - The African Queen (Charlie Allnut)
  - The Barefoot Contessa (1966 TV Asahi and 1979 TV Tokyo editions) (Harry Dawes)
  - The Caine Mutiny (1979 Fuji TV edition) (Lt. Cmdr. Philip Francis Queeg)
  - Sabrina (Linus Larrabee)
  - The Desperate Hours (NHK edition (Glenn Griffin))
- The Bridge on the River Kwai (1976 Fuji TV edition) (Lieutenant Colonel Nicholson (Alec Guinness))
- The Changeling (John Russell (George C. Scott))
- Charlie and the Chocolate Factory (2008 NTV edition) (Dr. Wilbur Wonka (Christopher Lee))
- Cinema Paradiso (Alfredo (Philippe Noiret))
- Clash of the Titans (1985 TV Asahi edition) (Ammon (Burgess Meredith))
- Julia (1980 Fuji TV edition) (Dashiell Hammett (Jason Robards))
- The Last Emperor (1989 TV Asahi edition) (Chen Baochen (Victor Wong))
- Sherlock Holmes (Mycroft Holmes (Charles Gray))
- Star Wars (1983 NTV edition) (Obi-Wan Kenobi (Alec Guinness))

==== Animated films ====
- Fun and Fancy Free (Pony Canyon edition (Edgar Bergen))
- The Little Mermaid (King Triton)
- The Many Adventures of Winnie the Pooh (Pony Canyon edition (Narrator))
- Song of the South (Pony Canyon edition (Uncle Remus))

==== Television animation ====
- SWAT Kats: The Radical Squadron (Pastmaster)

== Honours ==
- Medal of Honor with Purple Ribbon (1992)
- Order of the Rising Sun, 4th Class, Gold Rays with Rosette (1997)
