= Doraemon: Nobita and the Tin Labyrinth =

1993 film by Tsutomu Shibayama

Doraemon the Movie: Nobita and the Tin Labyrinth
- Theatrical release poster
- Directed by: Tsutomu Shibayama
- Screenplay by: Fujiko F. Fujio
- Based on: Doraemon Long Stories: Nobita and the Tin Labyrinth by Fujiko F. Fujio
- Produced by: Sōichi Besshi; Toshihide Yamada; Yoshiaki Koizumi
- Starring: Nobuyo Ōyama; Noriko Ohara; Michiko Nomura; Kaneta Kimotsuki; Kazuya Tatekabe; Rei Sakuma; Yuko Minaguchi; Tamio Ohki; Mie Suzuki; Kenyu Horiuchi; Shuichiro Moriyama
- Cinematography: Osakabe Toru; Hideko Takahashi
- Music by: Shunsuke Kikuchi
- Production company: Shin-Ei Animation
- Distributed by: Toho
- Release date: 6 March 1993 (Japan)
- Running time: 100 minutes
- Country: Japan
- Language: Japanese
- Box office: $25.7 million

Doraemon: Nobita and the Tin Labyrinth (ドラえもん のび太とブリキの迷宮(ラビリンス), Doraemon Nobita to Buriki no Rabirinsu) is a 1993 Japanese animated science fiction adventure film which premiered on 6 March 1993 in Japan, based on the 13th volume of the same name of the Doraemon Long Stories series. It is the 14th Doraemon film.

== Plot ==
The film begins with Nobita's father watching a strange advertisement of a fantastic resort called the Burikin Hotel on television at midnight. He made a reservation despite not even realizing he was talking to the advertisement. The next day, when Nobita is upset because his family never goes on a holiday trip, he discussed with the family their holiday plans, telling Nobita and Doraemon that he had made a reservation at said hotel.

Excited, Nobita tells Gian, Suneo, and Shizuka about it. However, Nobita's father and Nobita's mother cannot find Hotel Burikin anywhere on earth, and started to think if he was just dreaming about it, much to Nobita's horror. Fearful of what they think, Nobita avoids them, but he finds a mysterious suitcase laying at home. When he unlocks it, it opens a portal. He and Doraemon went through it, and discovers the hotel on the other side. The hotel is run by tin robots, after they say it's free, Nobita and Doraemon enjoy their stay together. Although, the robots warn them not to enter the basement.

When Nobita and Doraemon visits a mountain nearby, they plan to ski, but Nobita asks Doraemon for a gadget to help him. Although irritated, Doraemon gives Nobita a high powered ski, but Nobita sets off before he can fully explain how it works, much to Doraemon's anger. Sure enough, Nobita cannot stop the ski and gets separated from Doraemon. While Doraemon is searching for him with the Bamboo Copter, he spots a zeppelin, thinking it is the staff. Unexpectedly, it fires at him and knocks him out from the sky. Meanwhile, Nobita worrying Doraemon got mad and left returns to the hotel, but finds nobody, not even the tin robots there. When he takes a peek in the basement, a talking door scares him off, and he returns home. Meanwhile, Doraemon is captured by a small robot army, frees himself and gets knocked out after trying to investigate them further.

After days of not seeing Doraemon, Nobita assumes he went back to the future. Worse, after school, Gian and Suneo accuse him of lying about his trip, while Shizuka defends him. Completely stoic, Nobita uses the suitcase to show them the hotel, even though the staff is still nowhere to be seen. That evening, planes bomb and attack the group. Using rocks and a tree, Gian and the group knock the planes down. Their chase leads to a mysterious rocket, someone inside reveals that he has Doraemon captive and takes off. Devastated, they swear to rescue Doraemon somehow. Suddenly, the island takes off, revealing itself to be a giant spacecraft. Before they can return home the suitcase is eaten, the hotel staff finally reappear, along with a boy called Burikin.

Burikin reveals that the one who attacked are the robot army from the planet Chamocha, and he has fled from planet to planet to avoid them. After some convincing, Nobita and the group decides to help Burikin since they have to save Doraemon too. During their way to planet Chamocha, Burikin reveals that humans in Chamocha developed tin robots to help them in their daily lives. They created a super robot called Napogisutora, to help develop even more advanced robot technology. However, Burikin's father, Galion, realizes that if humans continue to depend on robots, they will become weaker because they're not using their own body. For this, Napogisutora made a 'solution' to invent the capsule for humans to move. The capsule is soon used by everyone in Chamocha. Galion, worried, takes his family to the hotel's basement, which is a labyrinth that leads into a secret lab. Soon, Burikin's parents are called by Chamocha's emperor, leaving him behind. He soon found out that Napogisutora had rebelled and captured all the humans, including his parents, from where he fled through space.

Meanwhile, somewhere in Chamocha, Doraemon is interrogated about the hotel. Despite not knowing anything, the robots keep torturing him with high voltage shocks until he stopped working. Doraemon then gets dumped into the ocean as scrap.

Hotel Burikin lands on uncharted waters in planet Chamocha to avoid detection. The group then splits up, Gian and Suneo will go to Mechapolis by submarine with disguise to find out where the human prisoners are, while Burikin, Shizuka, Nobita, and Tap will find the lab in the hotel's basement with a robot mouse to find their way. However, the hotel is discovered by Napogisutora's army and bombarded, causing the basement labyrinth to collapse. The robot mouse was destroyed, leaving the rest of the group to try to find their own way. While in Mechapolis, Gian and Suneo finds the prison camp where the humans are held, but their disguises got blown, forcing them to run.

After unable to find their way in the labyrinth, Burikin and Tap sends Nobita and Shizuka home through the suitcase forcefully, not wanting them to be in their trouble, and swallows the suitcase again, making Nobita and Shizuka back on earth without being able to return to the island. However, Nobita suddenly remembers about Doraemon's spare pocket, and he and Shizuka uses it to find the broken Doraemon deep in Chamocha's ocean. They use a Mini Dora to fix Doraemon and reunite. They soon make their way to Hotel Burikin. With Doraemon's gadgets, they map the underground labyrinth and finds Burikin and Tap. Meanwhile, after stealing a plane from Mechapolis, Gian and Suneo crash landed on the north pole. They find a wooden cottage, and are surprised to see Santa Claus living there.

Doraemon and others managed to find the lab in the basement. Burikin finds a disc containing the most advanced robot virus, left by his father in case Napogisutora started an uprising. They plan to insert the virus into Napogisutora, who commands all the robots in Chamocha. Once Gian and Suneo head back to the others with Santa's help, they set off for the city, infecting, insert the virus and freeing all of the humans in captivity.

The movie ends with the inhabitants of Chamocha promising to not heavily rely on robots again and the main characters going home.

== Cast ==
Character	Japanese voice actor
Doraemon	Nobuyo Ōyama
Nobita Nobi	Noriko Ohara
Shizuka Minamoto	Michiko Nomura
Suneo Honekawa	Kaneta Kimotsuki
Takeshi "Gian" Gōda	Kazuya Tatekabe
Tamako Nobi (Nobita's mother)	Sachiko Chijimatsu
Nobisuke Nobi (Nobita's father)	Yōsuke Naka
Sensei	Ryōichi Tanaka
Mini-Dora	Rei Sakuma
Garion's spouse	Yuko Minaguchi
Burikin	Tamio Ohki
Tap	Mie Suzuki
Clown	Kenyu Horiuchi
Napogisutora Issei	Shuichiro Moriyama
Nejirin Shogun	Osamu Katō
Nejirin captain	Kenichi Ogata
Professors	Masashi Hirose; Kazuhiko Kishino
Soldiers	Takumi Yamazaki; Chafurin
Galion Marquis	Yuusaku Yara
Mrs. Galion	Rei Sakuma

== See also ==
- List of Doraemon films
