= Nobita's the Night Before a Wedding =

1999 film by Ayumu Watanabe

- Cover of the 2004 DVD release by Shogakukan and Pony Canyon that includes The Doraemons: Funny Candy of Okashinana!? and Dorami-chan: Wow, The Kid Gang of Bandits!
- Kanji: のび太の結婚前夜
- Revised Hepburn: Nobita no Kekkon Zen'ya
- Directed by: Ayumu Watanabe
- Screenplay by: Noboru Shiroyama
- Based on: Doraemon by Fujiko F. Fujio
- Produced by: Sōichi Besshi; Tetsuo Kanno
- Starring: Nobuyo Ōyama; Noriko Ohara; Michiko Nomura; Kaneta Kimotsuki; Kazuya Tatekabe; Sumiko Shirakawa; Akira Kume
- Edited by: Hajime Okayasu
- Music by: Shunsuke Kikuchi
- Production company: Shin-Ei Animation
- Distributed by: Toho
- Release date: March 6, 1999 (Japan)
- Running time: 26 minutes
- Country: Japan
- Language: Japanese
- Box office: $31.2 million

Nobita's the Night Before a Wedding (のび太の結婚前夜, Nobita no Kekkon Zen'ya) is a 1999 Japanese animated science fiction comedy-drama short film. It premiered in Japan on March 6, 1999 on a triple feature with The Doraemons: Funny Candy of Okashinana!? and Doraemon: Nobita Drifts in the Universe. It received the 17th Golden Gross Award for Excellence (Silver Prize) at the 17th Golden Gross Awards. It is largely an expanded version of the 1981 chapter "The Night Before Nobita's Wedding".

Parts of Stand by Me Doraemon were largely based on this short film.

== Cast ==
Character	Japanese voice actor
Doraemon	Nobuyo Ōyama
Nobita Nobi; Adult Nobita Nobi	Noriko Ohara
Shizuka Minamoto; Adult Shizuka Minamoto	Michiko Nomura
Hidetoshi Dekisugi; Adult Hidetoshi Dekisugi	Sumiko Shirakawa
Adult Takeshi "Gian" Gōda	Kazuya Tatekabe
Adult Suneo Honekawa	Kaneta Kimotsuki
Michiko Minamoto	Masako Matsubara
Toshio Minamoto	Akira Kume
Sensei	Ryōichi Tanaka
Grandmother; Dress Stylist	Hiroko Emori
Taxi Driver	Toshihiko Nakajima
Takagi-san	Hiroyuki Shibamoto
Girl; Hotel Front Desk	Misa Watanabe
Next Door Woman	Ako Mayama

== Production ==
According to director Ayumu Watanabe, initially there were plans to add and mix in elements from other Doraemon stories, such as "Romance in the Snowy Mountain". However, it was decided to focus solely on the night before the day of Nobita and Shizuka's wedding, rather than trying to depict the entire process leading up to it within a half hour.

In the original story, Shizuka and her father Toshio connect towards the end through Doraemon using the "Honesty Antenna" secret gadget to make her confess her worry. But Watanabe decided to remove the gadget for the short film and instead have Shizuka confess her worries about leaving her parents after hearing her father start coughing, with his reasoning being, "I assume Fujiko F. Fujio chose to use a secret gadget in the manga due to space constraints [page limits]. I felt that using the 'Honesty Antenna' would make the daughter's genuine emotions feel fake—that feeling of being so overwhelmed with love and gratitude that she struggles to say goodbye to her father on the night before her wedding."

Watanabe also said of another additional scene exclusive to the short, "I added the scene where Shizuka receives a pearl necklace from her mother because I wanted to depict the significance of a mother entrusting something precious to her daughter."

== Soundtrack ==
=== Theme song ===
"The Door of Happiness"
Lyrics: Chikaco Sawada / Composition and Arrangement: Hitoshi Hayashi / Vocals: Yasushi Nakanishi, Chikaco Sawada

=== Insert song ===
"Nobita's the Night Before a Wedding (Suite)"
Featured as Track 22 on Disc 1 of the "Doraemon Sound Track History ~Shunsuke Kikuchi Music Collection~" album

== Release ==
The short film was released in Japan on March 6, 1999.

It was screened theatrically in a triple feature with the twentieth Doraemon feature-length film Doraemon: Nobita Drifts in the Universe and the Doraemons short film The Doraemons: Funny Candy of Okashinana!?.

=== Streaming ===
In 2024, for the occasion of the 90th anniversary of Fujiko F. Fujio, Doraemon: Nobita's the Night Before a Wedding alongside numerous animated short films of Doraemon, Perman, Esper Mami, and Chimpui were made available to stream on Prime Video in Japan as the "Fujiko F. Fujio's 90th Anniversary Film Masterpiece Selection".

== Reception ==
=== Box office reception ===
Because the short film was screened as a triple feature with The Doraemons: Funny Candy of Okashinana!? and Doraemon: Nobita Drifts in the Universe, it grossed ¥4.96 billion yen ($31.2 million) at the Japan box office.

=== Critical reception ===
The short film has been met with high acclaim from the Doraemon fandom for its animation, soundtrack, voice acting, themes, and emotional weight.

In her 2004 book "Anime Treasure Box" (Animation no Takarabako), well known Japanese animation researcher and critic Yoko Gomi described the film as "a masterwork that evokes the personality of Fujiko F.". Director Ayumu Watanabe responded that it was the highest compliment he could ever receive.
