= The Adventures of Marco Polo (1979 TV series) =

1979 anime

- Main character and English title

アニメーション紀行 マルコ・ポーロの冒険 (Animēshon Kikō Maruko Pōro no Bōken)
- Genre: History, Adventure, Travel, Documentary film
- Created by: Rustichello da Pisa and Marco Polo
- Anime television series
- Directed by: Katsuhiko Fujita; Hiroshi Matsumura; Kenichi Murakami; Tetsushi Nakamura
- Music by: Kei Ogura; Kōsuke Onozaki
- Studio: MK; Madhouse
- Original network: NHK
- Original run: 7 April 1979 – 5 April 1980
- Episodes: 43

Animated Travelogue: The Adventures of Marco Polo (アニメーション紀行 マルコ・ポーロの冒険, Animēshon Kikō Maruko Pōro no Bōken) is a Japanese anime television series that aired in 1979 and 1980 in Japan and in the early 1980s in Italy and Portugal, based on The Travels of Marco Polo. It is accompanied with documentary footage from the visited locations.

== Characters ==
=== Main characters ===
- Marco Polo: The main protagonist.
- Niccolò Polo: Marco Polo's father.
- Maffeo Polo: Marco Polo's uncle.
- Sharif: Sharif who accompanies the travel group.

== Plot ==
Map of Marco Polo's travels

Marco Polo's father, Niccolò, and uncle, Maffeo, return from their long journey abroad. Marco has grown up since they last met, and they decide to travel together.

== Preservation status ==
The original Japanese video tape masters were wiped after the original broadcast. The Japanese version has been reconstructed from various materials including film footage, music & effects audio tapes, off-air TV recordings made by fans, and sparse replacement stock footage. This reconstruction is being broadcast in 2025.
