= Cinderella Boy =

Monkey Punch one-shot manga (1980)

シンデレラボーイ (Shinderera Bōi)
- Manga
- Written by: Monkey Punch
- Published by: Kobunsha
- Magazine: Popcorn; Anime DO
- Published: 1980, 1982
- Anime television series
- Directed by: Tsuneo Tominaga
- Produced by: Tetsuya Dobashi; Tetsuo Kanno; Hiroaki Shigematsu
- Written by: Michihiro Tsuchiya
- Music by: Kensaku Tanikawa
- Studio: Magic Bus
- Licensed by: NA: Discotek Media
- Original network: WOWOW, AT-X, Television Niigata Network
- Original run: 21 June 2003 – 13 September 2003
- Episodes: 13

Cinderella Boy (Japanese: シンデレラボーイ, Hepburn: Shinderera Bōi) is a one-shot manga created by Monkey Punch. It was originally published in the Kobunsha magazine Popcorn in 1980. An alternate version was published in Anime DO in 1982. The plot follows the adventures of impoverished private detective Ranma Hinamatsuri and his thrill-seeking rich girl partner Rella "Cindy" Shirayuki in a futuristic city named "Kirin Town". Kirin Town is a lawless European city-state with its own currency with the name of the city being a pun on the English word for "killing". The two are badly injured when they stumble across an organised crime operation and are put back together into the same body by a mysterious doctor. Every night the stroke of midnight, their shared body changes both form and identity. Ranma becomes Rella, or vice versa. Neither is aware of any actions or situations their partner is involved in, completely losing consciousness until twenty-four hours later, when the change comes around to them again.

The names of the story's protagonists both reflect the nature of their change.

- Ranma shares a name with Ranma Saotome, the title character of Ranma ½, who also changes into a girl under certain conditions. However, the original Cinderella Boy manga predates Ranma ½ by several years.
- Rella is named after Cinderella, who is known for undergoing a major change at the stroke of midnight. Her last name "Shirayuki" translates into "Snow White" and the episode titles also evoke fairytales.

Discotek Media have licensed the anime for a North American release.

== Characters ==
Ranma Hinamatsuri (雛祭 乱馬, Hinamatsuri Ranma)
The acrophobic and technologically illiterate hero, he's constantly struggling to keep his agency self-supporting, partly because he regularly takes poorly paying cases out of a sense of chivalry. He also has no head for alcohol and collected model cars. Before becoming a detective, he was a local gangster who developed scruples.

Rella Cindy Shirayuki (レラ・シンディ・白雪, Rera Shindi Shirayuki)
A wealthy and adventurous woman who joined with Ranma to create the R&R Agency. She has an enormous capacity for alcohol and loves gadgets and computers. She also has an eye for jewellery and can expertly distinguish real from fake at a glance. Her father is a major organised crime figure in Japan, and she is estranged from him.

Son Tai Jin (孫 大人; Pinyin: Sūn Dàren)
Top mobster in the city, whenever he sees Ranma he orders his men to kill him. However, he has a good reputation as a pillar of the community with the public at large.

Alice (アリス, Arisu)
Mysterious woman who spies on Ranma and alternately saves him and sets him up to see what will happen.

Alamis de Panini (アラミス・デ・パニーニ, Aramisu de Panīni)
Wealthy buffoon who appears on every one of Rella's days to try to woo her. He is the son of a wealthy pharmaceutical manufacturer who Rella suspects of having poisoned her in Episode 5.

Dorothy (ドロシー・小津, Doroshī Ozu)
Rella's elderly and maternal maid who dislikes Ranma for his lack of class and leading her mistress into danger. She makes gadgets for her mistress.

Dr. Grimm (Dr.グリム, Dr. Gurimu)
The scientist who fused Ranma and Rella's bodies into one using his Personality Fusion theory.

Pinocchio (ピノキオ, Pinokio)
All-knowing underworld informant who enjoys making Ranma meet him on a window-washer's platform to do business.

Tinker Bell (ティンカーベル, Tinkāberu)
A net informant whose identity is unknown, Rella relies on her to gather information, it searches any information on the net.

Wendy (ウェンディ, Wendi)
Bar owner who is enthusiastically attracted to Ranma but is also one of Son Tai Jin's many girlfriends.

== Episodes ==
No.	Title	Original release date
1	"A Fable of a Never-Sleeping Town"; Transliteration: "Nemuranu Machi no Gūwa" (Japanese: 眠らぬ街の寓話)	June 24, 2003
Ranma and Rella are investigating a client's spouse when they learn that the casino where he is losing money is a front for an arms dealing operation. Their car crashes, apparently killing both of them, but Ranma reappears after a week, only to have the gangsters try to finish him off.
2	"The Fairy In the Back Alley"; Transliteration: "Rodijura no Yōsei" (Japanese: 路地裏の妖精)	June 30, 2003
Rella reappears at midnight with no memory of how she ended up naked and falling into the hotel pool (as Ranma escaped from the gangsters). She takes on a missing persons case only to discover her employer is out to murder the missing teenager, and then Ranma reappears, wearing a dress in a women's locker room.
3	"A Sweet Trap In the Toy Country"; Transliteration: "Omocha no Kuni no Amai Wana" (Japanese: オモチャの国の甘い罠)	July 9, 2003
Concerned about his missing day while Rella was in control, Ranma goes to the hospital for a check-up, but stumbles across a dying man and ends up wanted for the murder.
4	"The Sea Where the Beauty and the Beast Play"; Transliteration: "Bijo to Yajū no Asobu Umi" (Japanese: 美女と野獣のあそぶ海)	July 16, 2003
Rella finds herself in a sewer where Ranma was looking for a lost pet but quickly finds herself hired by a jeweller to use her uncanny resemblance to a foreign monarch to replace a fake piece of jewellery with the genuine article before their mistake is discovered, only to be caught up in schemes to kidnap and kill the real Queen Natasha.
5	"Countdown of the Poisoned Apple"; Transliteration: "Tokei Shikake no Doku Ringo" (Japanese: 時計仕掛けの毒リンゴ)	July 23, 2003
Dorothy witnesses the transformation and informs her mistress who goes out to eat and gets a note telling her the dish is poisoned. She spends the rest of the day looking for the antidote only to have to hand the problem over to Ranma at midnight.
6	"How to Cook Three Little Pigs"; Transliteration: "Ko Buts no Kyōdai no Ryōri-hō" (Japanese: 子ブタの兄弟の料理法)	July 28, 2003
Alice's organisation is after three killers known as the Mad Pig Brothers who stole information from them, so she hires Ranma then tells the Mad Pigs he's coming.
7	"Once Upon a Time, In a Dirty Town"; Transliteration: "Mukashimukashi, Gomi-darake no Machi de" (Japanese: 昔々、ゴミだらけの街で)	August 6, 2003
In a retrospective, Ranma meets Rella for the first time when he's hired to find out where she lives, only to discover he's pointed the way for her to be killed and he needs to save her and his best friend.
8	"An Angel In a Country of Gold"; Transliteration: "Kogane no Kuni no Enjeru" (Japanese: 黄金の国のエンジェル)	August 11, 2003
9	"A Bouquet for the Killer Angel"; Transliteration: "Koroshi no Tenshi ni Hanataba o" (Japanese: 殺しの天使に花束を)	August 18, 2003
10	"A Lying Red Riding Hood and an Honest Wolf"; Transliteration: "Usotsuki Akazukin no Honto no Ōkami" (Japanese: ウソつき赤ずきんとホントの狼)	August 25, 2003
11	"The Lost Magician"; Transliteration: "Yukue Fumei no Mahōtsukai" (Japanese: 行方不明の魔法使い)	September 3, 2003
12	"Who Has the Blue Bird?"; Transliteration: "Aoi Tori wa Dare no Te ni?" (Japanese: 青い鳥は誰の手に？)	September 9, 2003
13	"Cinderella Does Not Sleep"; Transliteration: "Shindarera wa Nemuranai" (Japanese: シンデレラは眠らない)	September 16, 2003
