= List of What Did You Eat Yesterday? characters =

The Japanese manga and live-action television drama series What Did You Eat Yesterday? features a cast of characters by Fumi Yoshinaga.

== Primary characters ==
Shiro Kakei (筧 史朗)
Portrayed by: Hidetoshi Nishijima
A serious and reserved lawyer. At the start of the series, he is 43 years old and living with Kenji, his partner of three years. Shiro's defining character traits are his love of cooking and his frugality: he took a job at a small law firm so that he can leave promptly at 6 o'clock each day to cook dinner for himself and Kenji, delights in purchasing food on sale, and keeps a strict household budget. He developed an interest in cooking while trying to lose weight in his thirties, and has consequently maintained a handsome and youthful appearance well into middle age.
Much of Shiro's internal conflict stems from his belief that he simultaneously does not fit in with the gay community or with straight society. Unlike Kenji, he is not open about his sexuality, remaining closeted at work and keeping a distant relationship with his parents. While he expresses initial unease about perceived as gay in public, over the course of the series he improves his relationship with his parents and becomes more comfortable with being seen as Kenji's partner.
Kenji Yabuki (矢吹 賢二)
Portrayed by: Seiyō Uchino
A cheerful and outgoing hairdresser, and partner to Shiro. He is skilled at managing difficult hairdressing customers, earning the title of "bomb disposal specialist" among his co-workers, and is promoted to manager of the salon in chapter 112. Previously, he worked as a busboy at a host club, where he used the nickname "Joe" in reference to Ashita no Joe.
In contrast to Shiro's stoicism, Kenji is sociable, campy in his personal style and sense of humor, and open about his sexuality. He has a distant relationship with his family, which improves upon the death of his estranged father (see Kenji-associated characters below). After he begins balding in chapter 78, he cuts his formerly permed hair short and dyes it blond.

== Shiro-associated characters ==
Hisae Kakei (筧 久栄)
Portrayed by: Meiko Kaji
Shiro's mother. In the manga, the shock of discovering Shiro's sexuality caused her to join a cult; she has subsequently become accepting of her son's sexuality, often to a fanatic degree, though she frequently confuses homosexuality and gender dysphoria. In the television drama, she is depicted as more reserved in her acceptance.
Goro Kakei (筧 悟朗)
Portrayed by: Kōtarō Shiga (episodes 1–5), Ryôsei Tayama (episodes 11–12) (Note: The television drama role was recast after actor Kotaro Shiga was hospitalized for a cerebral thrombus mid-production.)
Shiro's father. Though accepting of his son, he is largely ignorant in his understanding of homosexuality.
Kayoko Tominaga (富永 佳代子)
Portrayed by: Misako Tanaka
A housewife and friend of Shiro's. They met by chance after purchasing and splitting a watermelon together, and bonded over their shared love of cooking and bargain hunting.
Tominaga (富永)
Portrayed by: Toshihiro Yashiba
Kayoko's husband. His first name is never given.
Michiru Watanabe (née Tominaga) (渡辺 ミチル)
Portrayed by: Marin
Kayoko and Tominaga's adult daughter. She lives near their apartment, and frequently visits.
Yoshie Uemachi (上町 美江)
Portrayed by: Atsuko Takaizumi
The director of Shiro's law firm and expert in bankruptcy law.
Osamu Uemachi (上町 修)
Portrayed by: Chan Kawai
Yoshie's son, and a lawyer at Shiro's firm.
Shino Koyama (片岡 志乃)
Portrayed by: Yurika Nakamura
A paralegal at Shiro's firm.

== Kenji-associated characters ==
Yu Miyake (三宅 祐)
Portrayed by: Makita Sports
Kenji's manager at the hair salon, and former cosmetology school classmate. At the beginning of the series he is married with two children, though he and his wife eventually divorce due to his infidelity. He later moves to Vietnam, and promotes Kenji to be the salon's new manager. In Chapter 140, he returned to Japan after selling his salon business in Vietnam due to economic downturn, and focusing on teaching work. However, he plans to return to Vietnam once everything's settled down.
Reiko Miyake (三宅 玲子)
Portrayed by: Kaoru Okunuki
Yu's esthetician wife. Yu and Reiko divorce later in the series.
Kenichi Yabuki (矢吹 賢一)
Portrayed by: Bungo Uchida
Kenji's estranged father, who appears only through flashbacks. He left the family while Kenji was still a child, returning irregularly to extort money from Kenji's mother Mineko; because Kenichi became violent during these incidents, Mineko was never able to formally divorce him. 20 years prior to the events of the series, the Yabuki family became aware that he was still alive after receiving notice that he had applied for welfare (depicted in Chapter 34). In Chapter 64, Kenji is notified by the police that Kenichi has died.
Mineko Yabuki (矢吹 峰子)
Kenji's mother, who runs a hairdressing salon in Saitama. While her relationship with Kenji became strained after he came out to her, they reunite at Kenichi's funeral and begin to rebuild their relationship.
Masae Yabuki (矢吹 政江)
Kenji's eldest sister. A hairdresser who lives in Saitama.
Chieko Yabuki (矢吹 智恵子)
Kenji's second eldest sister. While trained as a hairdresser, she works as a department store clerk.

== Shiro and Kenji-associated characters ==
Daisaku Kohinata (小日向 大策)
Portrayed by: Koji Yamamoto
A colleague of Kayoko's husband, who later befriends Shiro and Kenji. He is handsome and stern, but becomes docile around his partner Wataru. Works as a director for an entertainment company.
Wataru Inoue (井上 航)
Portrayed by: Hayato Isomura
Kohinata's spoiled and high-maintenance partner. While Kohinata describes him as a "pretty boy like Gilbert," in reality, he is an unkempt slacker. Works from home as a day trader.
Tetsuro Honda (本田 鉄郎)
Portrayed by: Daikichi Sugawara
An older gay man who manages several restaurants, and who is friends with Shiro and Kenji. As his parents are still living and he cannot marry his partner Yoshi, he asks for Shiro's assistance in adopting Yoshi as his heir so that he can pass his estate to him.
Yoshiyuki Nagashima (長嶋 善之)
Portrayed by: Bokuzō Masana
Tetsuro's partner. A skilled cook who specializes in using organic ingredients.
Mami Mitani (三谷まみ)
Portrayed by: Rie Miyazawa
An idol and actress. Long admired by Shiro, he meets her through a meeting set up by Kohinata.
