= Garden Dreams =

Japanese one-shot manga

彼は花園で夢を見る (Kare wa Hanazono de Yume o Miru)
- Genre: Drama, Romance, Historical
- Manga
- Written by: Fumi Yoshinaga
- Published by: Shinshokan
- English publisher: NA: Digital Manga Publishing
- Magazine: Wings
- Published: September 1999
- Volumes: 1

Garden Dreams (彼は花園で夢を見る, Kare wa Hanazono de Yume o Miru) is a one-shot Japanese manga written and illustrated by Fumi Yoshinaga. The manga was serialised in Shinshokan's Wings between 1998 and 1999. Shinshokan released the manga in September 1999.

It is licensed and published in North America by Digital Manga Publishing on October 24, 2007.

== Plot ==
Farhad is a young man who lost his parents during a war and was rescued from the desert by Saud, a wandering bard who adopts him. Together, they travel from place to place, making a living through music and song. Their journey leads them to a distant Western land ruled by the melancholic Baron Bianni, a nobleman burdened by a sorrowful past.

== Analysis ==
Manga critic and scholar Natsume Fusanosuke highlights Garden Dreams as an early example of the artist's distinctive use of ma (beats) and yohaku (white or blank space) to convey subtle emotional transitions. According to Natsume, the story—set in a vaguely medieval European milieu—relies less on action than on understated facial expressions and silent pauses to build tension and emotional resonance. In Garden Dreams, Yoshinaga blends classic shōjo paneling with a restrained yet emotional grammar, setting the stage for the formal and thematic innovations seen in her later works.

A pivotal scene involving the quiet unraveling of a tragic romance unfolds across a two-page spread, composed primarily of facial close-ups and minimal background. The use of visual restraint, including nearly empty panels, evokes the depth of the characters' unspoken emotions. For Natsume, this minimalist approach reflects Yoshinaga's personal sensibility and "shyness", which manifests in the avoidance of overt dramatization.

The story's emotional climax—where the female protagonist silently acknowledges having known a painful truth all along, followed by her suicide—is executed with deliberate pacing and sparse visuals. Yoshinaga cuts between silent architectural shots and fragments like trailing hair, refusing to sensationalize the death.

== Reception ==
Coolstreak Cartoons's Leroy Douresseaux commends the author's on her ability to "emphasize the emotion and mood" by focusing "often a single character" in every frame. Pop Shock Culture's Katherine Dacey comments on the lack of "smut", "engaging talkfests" and detailed artwork in Garden Dreams, that usually peppers Fumi Yoshinaga's works. David Welsh at Comic World News comments on the drop in the author's standards compared to her other works: Antique Bakery, Flower of Life (manga) and Ichigenme... The First Class is Civil Law. Shaenon Garrity, writing for the appendix to Manga: The Complete Guide, felt the yaoi elements were toned down enough for a non-yaoi fan to enjoy the book, and praised Yoshinaga's character designs, calling them "some of the most handsome men in manga".
