= List of What Did You Eat Yesterday? chapters =

What Did You Eat Yesterday? (Japanese: きのう何食べた?, Hepburn: Kinō Nani Tabeta?) is a Japanese manga series written and illustrated by Fumi Yoshinaga. The slice of life series focuses on the relationship between Shiro Kakei and Kenji Yabuki, a middle-aged gay couple living in Tokyo, Japan.

The series premiered in 2007, and is serialized by Kodansha in the seinen manga magazine Weekly Morning. It has also been collected in tankōbon volumes, published by Kodansha in Japan since 2007 and by Vertical in North America since 2014; twenty-four volumes have been released in Japanese, and twenty-three in English.

== Volume list ==
No.	Original release date	Original ISBN	English release date	English ISBN
1	November 22, 2007	978-4-06-372648-0	March 25, 2014	978-1-93-913038-9
001. "Mitsuba"; 002. "Cold Vermicelli with Tuna and Tomatoes"; 003. "Boiled Young Bamboo"; 004. "Strawberry Jam"; 005. "Sardines"; 006. "General Bottomed-Out Prices"; 007. "Mackerel Pike Rice"; 008. "Tosa-Style Sesame Seeds"
2	November 21, 2008	978-4-06-372754-8 (SE); 978-4-06-364744-0 (LE)	May 20, 2014	978-1-93-913039-6
009. "Tuna Salad"; 010. "Chopped Leeks and Mapo Tofu"; 011. "Vegetables"; 012. "Beef"; 013. "Crispy Baby Sardine, Carrot, and Celery Salad"; 014. "Kanten"; 015. "Country-Style Vegetable Chowder"; 016. "Scallop and Daikon Salad"
3	October 23, 2009	978-4-06-372844-6	July 15, 2014	978-1-93-913040-2
017. "Citrus-Dressed Napa"; 018. "Kimchee Ramen"; 019. "Mochi Toppingful Soup"; 020. "Lotus Root Kinpira"; 021. "Sesame-Seasoned Sprouts and Leeks"; 022. "Stewed Hijiki"; 023. "Seasoned Rice with Eel"; 024. "Crêpes"
4	October 22, 2010	978-4-06-372942-9	September 2, 2014	978-1-93-913079-2
025. "Stewed Burgers"; 026. "Shrimp and Shiitake Sauce"; 027. "Tameshite Gatten Rolled Omelet"; 028. "Derring-do!"; 029. "White Leek"; 030. "Caramel-Simmered Apples"; 031. "Cold Tofu with Scallions and Zha Cai"; 032. "Spaghetti Napolitan"
5	September 23, 2011	978-4-06-387040-4	November 4, 2014	978-1-93-913080-8
033. "Stewed String Beans and Potatoes"; 034. "Miso Soup with Tomatoes and Chinese Yam"; 035. "Summer Veggie Curry"; 036. "Canned Corn"; 037. "Minestrone"; 038. "Pancakes"; 039. "Stewed Dried Daikon"; 040. "Chikuwas"
6	May 23, 2012	978-4-06-387116-6	January 6, 2015	978-1-93-913081-5
041. "Minced Napa Cabbage"; 042. "Sashimi Salad"; 043. "Rolled Eggs"; 044. "Curry Udon"; 045. "Squid"; 046. "Tingly Pickled Cucumber"; 047. "Anandamide"; 048. "Miso-Stewed Mackerel"
7	December 3, 2012	978-4-06-387158-6	March 31, 2015	978-1-94-122022-1
049. "Tea Sorbet with Peperoncino-Style Broccoli and Littleneck Clams"; 050. "Lightly Pickled Turnips and Carrots"; 051. "Hot Pot"; 052. "Mapo-Style Cellophane Noodles: 053. "Chili Shrimp with Asparagus and Eggs"; 054. "Kimchee Stew and Udon"; 055. "Eggplant and String Bean Stew"; 056. "Lightly Pickled Cabbage, Cucumbers, and Carrots"
8	December 3, 2013	978-4-06-387271-2 (SE); 978-4-06-362267-6 (LE)	May 5, 2015	978-1-94-122023-8
057. "Plum-Dressed Boiled Spinach"; 058. "White Dashi"; 059. "Hinode Udon"; 060. "Brownies"; 061. "Salted Rice Malt"; 062. "Cabbage Dressed with Plum and Baby Sardines"; 063. "Seafood Salad and Sawani-Style Soup"; 064. "Boiled Snap Peas and Carrot Salad"
9	August 22, 2014	978-4-06-388366-4	July 7, 2015	978-1-94-122050-4
065. "Ratatouille"; 066. "Roast Beef and Acqua Pazza"; 067. "Potato Gratin"; 068. "Fried Cabbage"; 069. "Black Bean and Anko"; 070. "Tabuchi"; 071. "Yellowtail Teriyaki"; 072. "Potato, Ham, and Cheese Pancake"
10	June 23, 2015	978-4-06-388446-3	May 16, 2016	978-1-94-299324-7
073. "Croquette"; 074. "Thai Curry"; 075. "Homestyle Yakiniku"; 076. "Homemade Pancakes"; 077. "Sweet and Sour Sauce"; 078. "Marinated Pork"; 079. "Hot-Pot"; 080. "Tuna and Grated Yam"
11	November 20, 2015	978-4-06-388527-9 (SE); 978-4-06-362316-1 (LE)	November 29, 2016	978-1-94-299375-9
081. "Pork Buns"; 082. "Inari"; 083. "Fried Eggplant"; 084. "Liver"; 085. "Okra"; 086. "Okonomiyaki"; 087. "Clam Chowder"; 088. "Quick Shortcake"
12	October 21, 2016	978-4-06-388647-4	August 22, 2017	978-1-94-505425-9
089. "Sukiyaki"; 090. "Apples"; 091. "Natto and Avocado Rice Bowl"; 092. "Snow Peas"; 093. "Yanagawa Stew"; 094. "Kabocha and Chicken Stew"; 095. "Stir-Fried Eggs and Tomato"; 096. "Sweet Potato Rice"
13	September 22, 2017	978-4-06-510261-9	August 7, 2018	978-1-94-719410-6
097. "Tantan Soup"; 098. "Potato Salad"; 099. "Miso Okayu"; 100. "Chicken Meatballs"; 101. "Tuna Marinade and Tasty Boiled Shrimp"; 102. "Chicken Rice and Sweet Chili Sauce"; 103. "Stewed Fish"; 104. "Stewed Kabocha and Eggplant"
14	July 23, 2018	978-4-06-512028-6	December 31, 2019	978-1-94-719470-0
105. "Porridge"; 106. "Tatsuta'age"; 107. "Mapo Starter"; 108. "Egg Whites"; 109. "Pork Kakuni and Chinese Okowa"; 110. "Pork Cutlet Bowl"; 111. "Butter Teriyaki"; 112. "Dried Baby Sardines"
15	March 22, 2019	978-4-06-514949-2	May 25, 2021	978-1-94-998076-9
113. "Broad Beans"; 114. "Yurinchi"; 115. "Daikon sprouts"; 116. "Chinese-Style Kinpira"; 117. "Stewed Daikon and Tofu"; 118. "Jam Sandwich Cookies"; 119. "Beef Stew"; 120. "Tokoyanabe Hotpot"
16	December 23, 2019	978-4-06-517831-7	August 31, 2021	978-1-64-729053-5
121. "Izuei Umegawa-tei"; 122. "Gyudon"; 123. "Crab and Avocado Salad"; 124. "Dry Curry"; 125. "Summer Pork Soup"; 126. "Frozen Yogurt"; 127. "Horse Mackerel Tempura"; 128. "Century Egg and Tomato Tofu"
17	August 20, 2020	978-4-06-520309-5	November 23, 2021	978-1-64-729068-9
129. "Garlic Chips"; 130. "French Toast"; 131. "Lettuce Shabu-Shabu"; 132. "Black Olives"; 133. "Ajillo and Pot-au-Feu"; 134. "Piccata and Carrot Butter Rice"; 135. "Meat-Wrapped Onigiri"; 136. "Meat Wraps"
18	May 21, 2021	978-4-06-523331-3	June 7, 2022	978-1-64-729090-0
137. "Pan-Fried"; 138. "Avocado Cheese Toast"; 139. "Pork Curry"; 140. "Fried Udon"; 141. "Steamed Chinese-Style Whole Fish"; 142. "Boiled Salted Salmon"; 143. "Mashed Sweet Potatoes with Apples"; 144. "Scrambled Tofu"
19	November 12, 2021	978-4-06-525798-2 (SE); 978-4-06-525820-0 (LE)	December 27, 2022	978-1-64-729091-7
20	October 21, 2022	978-4-06-529053-8 (SE); 978-4-06-529614-1 (LE)	July 25, 2023	978-1-64-729221-8
21	May 23, 2023	978-4-06-531536-1	May 28, 2024	978-1-64-729222-5
22	October 23, 2023	978-4-06-533294-8 (SE); 978-4-06-533537-6 (LE)	March 18, 2025	978-1-64-729412-0
23	September 20, 2024	978-4-06-536727-8	February 17, 2026	978-1-64-729481-6
24	June 23, 2025	978-4-06-539637-7	—	—
25	February 20, 2026	978-4-06-542316-5	—	—
