= Kiyokazu Chiba =

Japanese manga artist

Kiyokazu Chiba (千葉きよかず or 千葉潔和, Chiba Kiyokazu, born April 16, 1961 in Gotenba, Fukuoka Prefecture, Japan) is a Japanese manga artist. In 1981 he was worked as an assistant to Motoka Murakami, and by 1988 he had won the Monthly Young Jump "Rookie of the Year" award. That same year in Shōnen Sunday, his debut serial Akai Pegasus II Sho, the sequel to his master, Motoka Murakami's 1970s Akai Pegasus series. At the beginning of his career he signed his name with kanji, and later changed it to hiragana.

== Works ==
(written under the name Kiyokazu Chiba (千葉きよかず) (hiragana)

- Akai Pegasus II Sho (赤いペガサスII・翔) (written by Motoka Murakami)
- Dancing Thunder (ダンシングサンダー)
- Mari no Emono (マリーの獲物)
- Magnitude (マグニチュード) (written by Kazuya Kudou)
- Kitsune-bi (狐火)
- DAT 13 (written by Kaoru Shintani)
- Battle Freaks (バトルフリークス) (written by Konasu Akane)

(written under the name Kiyokazu Chiba (千葉潔和) (kanji)

- Rose Densetsu (ローズ伝説) (written by Shinichi Ishihara)
- Knight - Kishi no Shōgō (ナイト―騎士の称号) (written by Yasushi Matsuda)
- ODAMARI
- Ryūko (龍子)
- Mask (マスク) (written by Osamu Ichino)
- Gōkyū Shōjo (剛球少女) (written by Seiichi Tanaka)
- Honoo to Koori (炎と氷) (written by Fuyuki Shindou)
- Splash!! (スプラッシュ!!) (written by Yasushi Matsuda)
- Nihonjū Kuni Kaisen (日本中国開戦) (written by Yukio Kiyasu)
- Lady Eagle (レディイーグル) (written by Sho Narumi)
