= Dr. Jin =

2012 South Korean television series

- Promotional poster for Dr. Jin
- Hangul: 닥터 진
- RR: Dakteo Jin
- MR: Takt'ŏ Chin
- Genre: Romance; Time travel; Medical drama
- Based on: Jin by Motoka Murakami
- Written by: Han Ji-hoon; Jeon Hyun-jin
- Directed by: Han Hee
- Starring: Song Seung-heon; Park Min-young; Lee Beom-soo; Kim Jae-joong; Lee So-yeon
- Ending theme: "Living Like a Dream" by Kim Jaejoong
- Country of origin: South Korea
- Original language: Korean
- No. of episodes: 22

Production
- Producer: Cho Yoon-jung
- Camera setup: Multi-camera
- Production companies: Kross Pictures; Victory Contents

Original release
- Network: Munhwa Broadcasting Corporation
- Release: May 26 – August 12, 2012

Related
- Jin (TBS)

Dr. Jin (Korean: 닥터 진; RR: Dakteo jin) is a 2012 South Korean historical television drama series, starring Song Seung-heon in the title role of Dr. Jin, a 21st-century neurosurgeon who travels back in time to the Joseon period. Also starring Park Min-young, Lee Beom-soo, Kim Jae-joong, and Lee So-yeon, it aired on MBC from May 26 to August 12, 2012 on Saturdays and Sundays at 21:50 for 22 episodes.

Based on the Japanese manga series Jin written by Motoka Murakami, the series is the third television adaptation of the manga following the Japanese television drama JIN, starring Takao Osawa which aired on TBS in 2009 and its sequel in 2011. The setting was changed from the original's Edo period to the Joseon period, during the reign of King Cheoljong of Joseon, and real-life Japanese historical figure Sakamoto Ryōma was replaced with Joseon political figure Lee Ha-eung.

== Plot ==
Jin Hyuk (Song Seung-heon) is a gifted neurosurgeon who was born into a family of doctors. His success rate in surgery hovers at 100%, with his ability to quickly analyze any situation, and his extremely steady hands. Due to his personal pursuit of perfection, he has a cold attitude and lacks compassion. He plans to give his girlfriend Yoo Mi-na (Park Min-young), also a doctor, a ring as a gift from their mother. But after an argument, Mi-na gets into a car accident and goes into a coma.

After surgically removing a foetus-shaped tumor from a patient's brain, a mysterious power causes Jin Hyuk to travel 150 years back in time to the year 1860 during the Joseon period, when medical technology was still in its infant stages. He begins treating people of the era, but the lack of necessary implements and rudimentary medical knowledge of the period forces him to develop medical devices and medicine by himself, and seek new ways to aid the sick. He meets young noblewoman Young-rae (who looks like Mi-na), who is betrothed to her childhood friend Kim Kyung-tak (Kim Jae-joong), but is not in love with him. Through this challenging process, and with the help of Young-rae and Lee Ha-eung (Lee Beom-soo), Jin Hyuk becomes a true doctor. But his actions start interfering with history, and Jin Hyuk is faced with hard choices.

== Cast ==
- Song Seung-heon – Jin Hyuk

A 21st century doctor who finds himself trapped in the Joseon era following a tragic accident that puts his girlfriend, Yoo Mi-na, into a coma. After he arrives in Joseon, Jin meets Hong Young-rae, a noblewoman who is an incarnation of his girlfriend.

- Park Min-young – Hong Young-rae (1860) / Yoo Mi-na (2012)

Hong Young-rae comes from a noble family, and she is a kindhearted woman who dreams of becoming a doctor after she meets Jin when he saves her rebel brother.

- Lee Beom-soo – Lee Ha-eung

A nobleman who becomes Jin's trusted friend. He is the future Heungseon Daewongun (Great Prince Regent, Father of King Gojong).

- Kim Jae-joong – Kim Kyung-tak

The illegitimate son of Minister Kim and his concubine, he is a military officer who is in love with Hong Young-rae, the sister of his friend Young-hwi.

- Lee So-yeon – Choon-hong

A mysterious gisaeng. She fell in love with Jin when he saved her as child in the modern era, revealing that she is a time traveler herself. She is the girl with the Rubix Cube.

- Jin Yi-han – Hong Young-hwi

Young-rae's older brother and best friend to Kim Kyung-tak, he is an idealistic nobleman who leads the rebels. He later works with Ha-eung.

- Noeul – Yeon-shim, a gisaeng with Choon-hong
- Kim Eung-soo – Minister Kim Byung-hee, nobleman and head of the powerful Andong Kim clan
- Kim Hye-ok – Young-rae's mother
- Kim Il-woo – Yoo Hong-pil
- Jung Eun-pyo – Heo Gwang, a Joseon doctor
- Lee Seung-joon – Kwon Ik-joo
- Lee Won-jong – Joo Pal, a local gangster
- Kim Kwang-sik – Kkae Bok
- Kim Myung-soo – Kim Dae-gyun, Kim Byung-hee's legitimate son and heir
- Kim Byung-choon
- Jang Young-nam as noblewoman Jo (guest appearance, ep 7–8)
- Jo Woo-jin as Deuk-chil

== Production ==
The early working title was Time Slip Dr. Jin (타임슬립 닥터 진).

The series was filmed at MBC Dramia in Gyeonggi Province. This marked Song's return to television in 15 months since My Princess in 2011. It was also Kim Jaejoong's second drama since Protect the Boss in 2011, as well as his first historical drama. The series was initially planned for 20 episodes, but there were talks of an extension in July as reportedly both the production and actors felt that the 20 episodes were not enough to tell the full story. However this was strongly objected to by the actors' agencies citing low viewership ratings, the story's slow pace, and future schedules.

== Reception ==
According to AGB Nielsen Media Research, the first episode that aired on May 26, 2012 received a nationwide viewership rating of 12.2 percent, which was 1.9 percent behind its rival A Gentleman's Dignity on SBS.

Episode #	Original broadcast date	Average audience share			
Episode #	Original broadcast date	TNmS Ratings		AGB Nielsen	
Episode #	Original broadcast date	Nationwide	Seoul National Capital Area	Nationwide	Seoul National Capital Area
01	May 26, 2012	10.7%	13.5%	12.2%	14.1%
02	May 27, 2012	10.2%	11.4%	11.8%	13.2%
03	June 2, 2012	13.8%	16.1%	14.0%	16.5%
04	June 3, 2012	13.6%	16.5%	14.4%	16.3%
05	June 9, 2012	13.5%	15.6%	13.6%	15.3%
06	June 10, 2012	14.2%	16.5%	13.8%	15.5%
07	June 16, 2012	14.4%	14.7%	14.5%	16.1%
08	June 17, 2012	13.3%	15.1%	14.0%	16.3%
09	June 23, 2012	13.2%	15.6%	13.1%	14.8%
10	June 24, 2012	13.9%	16.1%	12.7%	14.2%
11	June 30, 2012	13.0%	14.3%	13.0%	14.9%
12	July 1, 2012	14.2%	14.8%	12.4%	13.7%
13	July 7, 2012	12.8%	13.7%	12.8%	13.5%
14	July 8, 2012	13.6%	14.2%	13.2%	14.8%
15	July 14, 2012	12.9%	13.6%	12.1%	13.3%
16	July 15, 2012	13.0%	13.8%	11.9%	13.4%
17	July 21, 2012	12.5%	13.0%	11.4%	12.6%
18	July 22, 2012	12.4%	13.7%	11.0%	12.4%
19	July 28, 2012	14.7%	16.3%	13.7%	14.9%
20	July 29, 2012	11.6%	12.4%	11.8%	13.0%
21	August 5, 2012	12.1%	12.2%	13.4%	15.0%
22	August 12, 2012	8.4%	8.7%	8.8%	9.9%

== Remark ==
- Episode 21 wasn't aired on Saturday August 4 due to broadcast of the 2012 Summer Olympics in London, United Kingdom. This episode was aired on Sunday August 5, 2012.
- Episode 22 wasn't aired on Saturday August 11 due to broadcast of the 2012 Summer Olympics in London, United Kingdom. This episode was aired on Sunday August 12, 2012.

== Original soundtrack ==
1. 닥터진
2. 살아도 꿈인 것처럼 (Living Like a Dream) – Kim Jaejoong
3. 그대가 올까요 (Will You Come) – Zia
4. 눈물길 (Road of Tears) – Changmin, Seulong (2AM)
5. 마지막 사랑 (Last Love) – Song Seung-heon
6. 연리지 (Now and Forever) – Ock Joo-hyun
7. 바람에 실려 (Saddle the Wind) – Lee Beom-soo
8. 눈물
9. 고뇌
10. 사랑
11. 인연
12. 바람에 실려 (inst)
13. 마지막 사랑 (inst)
14. 눈물길 (inst)
15. 그대가 올까요 (inst)
16. 살아도 꿈인 것처럼 (inst)

== Awards ==
- 2012 MBC Drama Awards: Best New Actor – Kim Jaejoong
- 2013 Seoul International Drama Awards: Outstanding Korean Drama OST – "Living Like a Dream" by Kim Jaejoong

== International broadcast ==
At the 18th Shanghai Television Festival in June 2012, the broadcast rights of the show were sold to Taiwan and Thailand.

- Taiwan: GTV – September 2012
- Singapore: Channel U – April 1, 2013
- Japan: DATV – May 25, 2013 onwards with Japanese subtitles for 22 episodes. However the relationship between the main characters of Jin Hyuk and Yoo Mi-na in the present (played by Song Seung-heon and Park Min-young respectively) was changed from lovers to siblings. Thus their love scenes were edited out, and to flesh out the sibling relationship, new scenes with child actors as well as narration by Song were added.
- Philippines: It aired on TeleAsia Chinese starting November 21, 2013, with the series dubbed in Hokkien Chinese.
- Thailand: It aired on 3SD starting February 15, 2015, with repeat on 3Family starting February 1, 2016.

== See also ==
- Life on Mars, British miniseries with a similar premise.
