= Great Swordsman =

1984 video game

- Title screen
- Developer(s): Allumer
- Publisher(s): JP: Taito; NA: Romstar
- Platform(s): Arcade
- Release: JP: September 1984; NA: June 1985
- Genre(s): Fighting game
- Mode(s): Up to 2 players simultaneously

Great Swordsman (グレートソードマン) is an arcade fighting game developed by Allumer and published by Taito in 1984. In 2005, it was later included in Taito Legends.

== Gameplay ==
In Great Swordsman, one or two players can play while taking turns. Players control with two-way joystick and three buttons that have varying hit levels which creates different level attacks. Like in Data East's Karate Champ, buttons must be held. If they are released, the characters will revert to their standing animation. Moves can be defended against by intercepting the opponents weapons.

The object of the game is to land a hit on the opponent or push them off the mat to score a point. There are fifteen levels with three different modes. The first three are fencing, the next five are kendo, and the final seven are gladiator-based. After clearing all levels in one mode, the "VICTORY SCORE" will be added to the players scores, even if they were tied with their opponents at the end. After fifteen levels are completed, the players start over in a higher difficulty setting and repeat after the next fifteen levels are also cleared. There are also bonus levels where players must deflect arrows to score extra points.

== Reception ==
In Japan, Game Machine listed Great Swordsman on their September 1, 1984 issue as being the most-successful table arcade unit of the month.

== See also ==
- Musashi no Ken – Tadaima Shugyō Chū
- Gladiator
- Blandia, sequel to Gladiator.
- Internet Archive, browser based playable emulator of classic video games
- MAME emulator used by Internet Archive
