= List of What Did You Eat Yesterday? episodes =

What Did You Eat Yesterday? (Japanese: きのう何食べた?, Hepburn: Kinō Nani Tabeta?) is a Japanese television drama produced by Shochiku. Adapted from the manga of the same name by Fumi Yoshinaga, the series premiered on April 5, 2019, on TV Tokyo.

== Episode list ==
=== Season 1 ===
| No. | Title | Directed by | Original release date |
|---|---|---|---|
| 1 | "Episode 1" | Kazuhito Nakae | April 5, 2019 |
Shiro becomes upset when he learns that Kenji has discussed their relationship and sex life with one of his hairdressing clients.
| 2 | "Episode 2" | Kazuhito Nakae | April 12, 2019 |
Shiro splits the cost of a watermelon with Kayoko, a local housewife, and they bond over their shared love of bargain hunting. Kenji is unsettled when he learns that Shiro buys bread from a woman he was in a relationship with when he was closeted.
| 3 | "Episode 3" | Kazuhito Nakae | April 19, 2019 |
Kayoko's husband introduces Shiro to Kohinata, his gay colleague. Shiro learns that his father Goro must undergo surgery for esophageal cancer.
| 4 | "Episode 4" | Katsumi Nojiri | April 26, 2019 |
Goro's surgery is performed successfully. Over Christmas dinner, the origin of Shiro and Kenji's relationship is revealed through a flashback: they became friends after meeting through Shiro's then-boyfriend at a bar in Ni-chōme, moved in together after Kenji's apartment was damaged by flooding, and began dating thereafter.
| 5 | "Episode 5" | Katsumi Nojiri | May 3, 2019 |
Shiro's mother Hisae urges him to think seriously about settling down as he approaches old age, prompting Shiro to realize he knows little about Kenji's family. Shiro later visits his parents for New Year's.
| 6 | "Episode 6" | Katsumi Nojiri | May 10, 2019 |
Shiro takes on a female apprentice at his law firm. Later, he is later introduced to Kohinata's partner Wataru.
| 7 | "Episode 7" | Kenji Katagiri | May 17, 2019 |
Shiro and Kenji go on a double date with Kohinata and Wataru. Kenji cares for Shiro after he catches a cold.
| 8 | "Episode 8" | Kenji Katagiri | May 24, 2019 |
Shiro feels self-conscious after he and Kenji go to a restaurant with Tetsuro and Yoshi, an older gay couple. They later come to Shiro and Kenji's apartment, where Tetsuro asks for Shiro's assistance in adopting Yoshi as his heir so that he may inherit Tetsuro's estate.
| 9 | "Episode 9" | Kenji Katagiri | June 7, 2019 |
Shiro buys himself and Kenji a pair of wedding rings so that Shiro will not be approached by single women at work events. Kenji's boss Yu admits to him that he has cheated on his wife.
| 10 | "Episode 10" | Kazuhito Nakae | June 14, 2019 |
Kenji receives a welfare notice regarding his estranged father. Shiro's closeness to Kohinata makes Kenji fear that Shiro will leave him.
| 11 | "Episode 11" | Kazuhito Nakae | June 21, 2019 |
Hisae and Goro ask to meet Kenji for New Year's. Shiro and Kenji invite Kohinata and Wataru to their apartment for Christmas dinner.
| 12 | "Episode 12" | Kazuhito Nakae | June 28, 2019 |
Shiro and Kenji visit Hisae and Goro for New Year's, and later visit a cafe together.

=== Special ===
| No. | Title | Directed by | Original release date |
|---|---|---|---|
| 13 | "2020 New Year Special" | Kazuhito Nakae; Katsumi Nojiri; Kenji Katagiri | January 1, 2020 |
Kohinata introduces Shiro to Mami Mitani, an actress he has long admired. Wataru and Kenji unexpectedly bond while shopping together. Kenji is troubled when he discovers he has overspent on the household budget.

=== Season 2 ===
| No. | Title | Directed by | Original release date |
|---|---|---|---|
| 1 | "Episode 1" | TBA | TBA |
| 2 | "Episode 2" | TBA | TBA |
| 3 | "Episode 3" | TBA | TBA |
| 4 | "Episode 4" | TBA | TBA |
| 5 | "Episode 5" | TBA | TBA |
| 6 | "Episode 6" | TBA | TBA |
| 7 | "Episode 7" | TBA | TBA |
| 8 | "Episode 8" | TBA | TBA |
| 9 | "Episode 9" | TBA | TBA |
| 10 | "Episode 10" | TBA | TBA |
| 11 | "Episode 11" | TBA | TBA |
| 12 | "Episode 12" | TBA | TBA |
