= Erotic Comics in Japan: An Introduction to Eromanga =

2006 Japanese book

- Author: Kaoru Nagayama
- Original title: エロマンガ・スタディーズ 「快楽装置」としての漫画入門
- Illustrator: Masaki Kojima; Shindo L (Paperback)
- Language: Japanese (2006); English (2020)
- Published: November 1, 2006
- Publisher: East press Chikuma Shobō; Amsterdam University Press
- Publication place: Japan
- Pages: 290
- ISBN: 978-9-46-372712-9

Erotic Comics in Japan: An Introduction to Eromanga is a 2006 book written by Kaoru Nagayama. In 2014, an expanded paperback edition was released with an additional section on "sex and politics." Kimi Rito is supervising the paperback edition. A Chinese version was released in Taiwan in January 2020. An English version translated by Jessica Bauwens-Sugimoto and Patrick W. Galbraith was published by Amsterdam University Press in November 2020.

== Overview ==
This book defines "eromanga" as manga in which erotic elements are the main theme of the work, and states that the prejudices that the author claims are cast against the genre are irrational. On the other hand, the author himself admits that he has not necessarily escaped those prejudices. He states that it is worthwhile to consider "eromanga," and attempts to explore its characteristics. In his attempt to consider the history of erotic comics, he bases his thinking on Richard Dawkins' meme theory.

The book is divided into chapters and examines topics such as gekiga, bishōjo, lolicon, large breasts, sibling incest, rape, romance, sadomasochism, sexual minorities, and gender, all of which are depicted in eromanga.

Fusanosuke Natsume, Mari Kotani, and Hiroki Azuma have contributed endorsements.

== Reception ==
This book has been described as a "perfect guide" for understanding the overall picture of the erotic comics genre in Japan.Da Vinci's Sato Keisuke has positioned this book alongside Yoshihiro Yonezawa's Postwar Erotic Manga History as a leading research book on "erotic manga research."

Author of The History of Hentai Manga: An Expressionist Examination of EroManga Kimi Rito, states that his experience reading Erotic Comics in Japan was what prompted him to begin serious research into erotic manga.

This book is one of the 30 books listed in Jimbun Shoin's Manga Studies Book Guide Series: 30 Basic Books, edited by Kazuma Yoshimura and Jacqueline Berndt.
