= Jin (TV series) =

- Promotional poster
- Also known as: JIN-仁-
- Genre: Sci-fi medical Drama; Fantasy
- Based on: Jin by Motoka Murakami
- Written by: Murakami Motoka (manga); Morishita Yoshiko
- Directed by: Hirakawa Yuichiro; Yamamuro Daisuke; Kawashima Ryutaro
- Starring: Takao Osawa; Haruka Ayase; Miki Nakatani; Masaaki Uchino
- Country of origin: Japan
- Original language: Japanese
- No. of seasons: 2
- No. of episodes: 22

Production
- Producers: Ishimaru Akihiko; Tsuru Masaaki
- Production location: Japan
- Running time: approximately 60 Minutes

Original release
- Network: TBS
- Release: 11 October 2009 – 26 June 2011

Jin (JIN-仁-) is a Japanese television drama series, first broadcast on TBS in 2009 and a second season in 2011. It is based on the Japanese manga series, Jin, written by Motoka Murakami.

It was one of the most popular dramas of the year and won many major awards. In 2024, the series began streaming internationally on Netflix.

== Plot ==
=== Season 1 ===
The story follows a brain surgeon named Jin Minakata who has spent the last two years in anguish, as his fiancee, Miki, herself a doctor, lies in a vegetative state after an operation he performed. One day, he is knocked unconscious by a panicking patient at the hospital and awakens to find himself transported back in time to the Edo period. He is soon attacked by a samurai, but he escapes with the help of a man named Kyōtarō Tachibana. Kyōtarō suffers a serious injury to the head while trying to protect him, but Jin manages to save his life despite a lack of proper medical equipment. Because of that, Kyōtarō's sister Saki begins taking an interest in Jin and becomes his assistant. Meanwhile, Jin is determined to find a way back to the present.

=== Season 2 ===
Two years after Jin arrives in Edo, he and Saki develop a sweet confectionery that contains medicine for Saki's mother who has a severe case of beriberi. Meanwhile, Ryōma asks Jin to care for Kaishū Katsu's mentor, Shōzan Sakuma. Shōzan is in a critical state after being attacked by the Shinsengumi. Jin is reluctant because curing Shōzan would mean changing the course of history. However, Shōzan tells him that he too is involved in the "present".

== Cast ==
- Takao Osawa as Jin Minakata
- Haruka Ayase as Saki Tachibana
- Miki Nakatani as Miki Tomonaga / Nokaze
- Keisuke Koide as Kyōtarō Tachibana
- Yumi Asō as Ei Tachibana
- Masaaki Uchino as Ryōma Sakamoto
- Fumiyo Kohinata as Rintarō Katsu
- Takahiro Fujimoto as Kichinosuke Saigō
- Kazufumi Miyazawa as Isami Kondō
- Kazuyuki Asano as Hisashige Tanaka
- Tomoka Kurokawa as Princess Kazu
- Tetsuya Takeda as Kōan Ogata
- Masachika Ichimura as Shōzan Sakuma
- Kenta Kiritani as Yūsuke Saburi
- Hiromasa Taguchi as Jun'an Yamada
- Jirō Satō as Genkō Fukuda
- Atsuo Nakamura as Tatsugorō Shinmon

== Music ==
Ending:

- Aitakute Ima (逢いたくていま, Missing You Now) by Misia (Season 1)
- Itoshiki Hibi yo (いとしき日々よ, Oh Sweet Days) by Ken Hirai (Season 2)

== Awards ==
=== Jin 1 ===
Year	Award	Category	Recipients	Result
2010	63rd Television Drama Academy Awards	Best Drama		Won
2010	63rd Television Drama Academy Awards	Best Actor	Takao Osawa	Won
2010	63rd Television Drama Academy Awards	Best Supporting Actor	Uchino Masaaki	Won
2010	63rd Television Drama Academy Awards	Best Supporting Actress	Ayase Haruka	Won
2010	63rd Television Drama Academy Awards	Best Scriptwriter	Morishita Yoshiko	Won
2010	63rd Television Drama Academy Awards	Best Director	Hirakawa Yuichiro, Yamamuro Daisuke, Kawashima Ryutaro	Won
2010	63rd Television Drama Academy Awards	Best Theme song	"Aitakute Ima" by MISIA	Won
2010	3rd Tokyo Drama Awards	Grand Prix		Won
2010	3rd Tokyo Drama Awards	Best Performance by an Actor	Takao Osawa	Won
2010	3rd Tokyo Drama Awards	Best Producer	Akihiko Ishimaru	Won
2010	3rd Tokyo Drama Awards	Asia Award		Won

=== Jin 2 ===
Year	Award	Category	Recipients	Result
2011	4th Tokyo Drama Awards	Best Drama		Won
2011	4th Tokyo Drama Awards	Best Supporting Actor	Masaaki Uchino	Won
2011	4th Tokyo Drama Awards	Asia Award		Won
2011	4th Tokyo Drama Awards	Special Award	Production Staff	Won
2011	69th Television Drama Academy Awards	Best Drama		Won
2011	69th Television Drama Academy Awards	Best Actor	Takao Osawa	Won
2011	69th Television Drama Academy Awards	Best Supporting Actor	Masaaki Uchino	Won
2011	69th Television Drama Academy Awards	Best Supporting Actress	Ayase Haruka	Won
2011	69th Television Drama Academy Awards	Best Screenwriter	Morishita Yoshiko	Won
2011	69th Television Drama Academy Awards	Best Director	Hirakawa Yuichiro, Yamamuro Daisuke, Nasuda Jun	Won
