= The Moon and the Sandals =

Japanese manga series

- Cover of the first volume in the English edition.

月とサンダル (Tsuki to Sandal)
- Genre: Yaoi
- Manga
- Written by: Fumi Yoshinaga
- Published by: Houbunsha
- English publisher: NA: Digital Manga Publishing
- Magazine: Hanaoto
- Original run: March 1996 – February 2000
- Volumes: 2

The Moon and the Sandals (月とサンダル, Tsuki to Sandal) is a Japanese manga series written and illustrated by Fumi Yoshinaga, her debut work. Originally serialized in Hanaoto magazine, the individual chapters were collected and published in two tankōbon volumes by Houbunsha in March 1996 and February 2000, respectively. It follows the romantic relationships of high school teacher Ida, his lover, a student named Kobayashi who develops a crush on Ida and is rejected, and the fellow student whom Kobayashi comes to love afterwards.

The series is licensed and published in English in North America by Digital Manga Publishing. It was nominated as one of the Young Adult Library Services Association 2008 Great Graphic Novels.

== Plot ==
High school student Kobayashi goes to the home of his history teacher, Ida, to confess that he is in love with him. When he arrives, he overhears Ida arguing with his lover Hashizume. A talented chef, Hashizume is planning to move to Kyoto to work at a famous restaurant and wants Ida to come with him. Ida, however, cannot transfer out of the city and would have to quit teaching to go. He debates doing it as he would lose his job anyway if someone found out he was gay, but eventually decides not to as teaching is his life dream. Kobayashi begins visiting Ida regularly and cooking meals for him. Eventually he kisses Ida and asks him to date him, but before Ida can reply Hashizume arrives. He quit the Kyoto job and found one instead there in Tokyo, and asks Ida to live with him. Heartbroken, Kobayashi runs off. Eventually he gets over the rejection and remains friends with Ida, visiting him at school and acting as his confidant about his relationship with Hashizume.

Hashizume and Ida begin searching for a place to live together, but no one wants to rent an apartment to two unrelated men, saying they would be messy and less reliable for payments and renewing. Kobayashi wonders if it's an excuse to avoid renting to a gay couple. Ida suggests one of them adopt the other, which would be the equivalent of gay marriage. This would also allow them to say that they are brothers for the purposes of renting. Hashizume initially rejects the idea, causing Ida to think he does not love him. They have an argument in which Ida accuses Hashizume of having never said "I love you" and Hashizume ends up slapping Ida and running off. Crying alone, Ida remembers how they first became a couple and that Hashizume said the words the first time they kissed. Hashizume returns, bringing the adoption forms as well as an old marriage registry showing he had wanted the same thing for a long time.

Kobayashi's English tutor and friend Naru gets hurt in an accident, so she arranges for her older brother to take her place in exchange for Kobayashi making him lunches. Their initial sessions are very antagonistic, with Toyo complaining about Kobayashi's lack of English skills, and Kobayashi complaining about Toyo's pickiness about food. Eventually they become friendlier, but then Naru confesses her feelings to Kobayashi, though she knows he is gay. He gently rejects her, and despite Kobayashi's worries, Toyo does not get mad at him. Their friendship continues deepening, and Toyo realizes that Kobayashi is always watching him. After confirming with Naru that Kobayashi is gay, Toyo confronts him and Kobayashi confirms that he is in love with him. Due to an incident in his past, Toyo initially rejects his feelings, but one night during a storm Kobayashi is hurt protecting Toyo and they go back to Kobayashi's house to treat the wound. Toyo tells him about a man he was in love with, but rejected publicly out of fear of his friend's reactions and because the man was moving away. Toyo finally accepts Kobayashi's feelings. They initially keep their relationship secret from Naru, afraid of hurting her, but she quickly realizes what is going on. She yells at Kobayashi for lying because they are supposed to be friends, then tells him she is okay with their relationship. After they part ways, she walks along crying and runs into Ida, who comforts her.

A year later, Hashizume's boss aids him in opening his own restaurant, which he names "Ida." Kobayashi is accepted into the same college that Toyo is attending, and Toyo has passed the government test to work in the Ministry of Finance. Naru is continuing to get past her rejection. As more time passes, Hashizume's restaurant grows popular and he hires a single female assistant, Kaori. Ida grows uneasy about his being close to a beautiful woman until Hashizume points out that they are both gay, so why should he care. To ease Ida's mind further, he tells Kaori about him, which does not bother her at all. Two years after Toyo begins working at the Ministry of Finance, Kobayashi is now teaching world history at his old high school alongside Ida. After his supervisor asks him about his box lunches, Toyo demands Kobayashi stop making them out of fear someone will find out that he is gay. Work becomes so busy Toyo does not have time to call Kobayashi for forty days. When he finally has a free day coming up, he confesses to his supervisor that his "girlfriend" is a "boyfriend", then goes to Kobayashi. After they make love, he tells Kobayashi he may quit. Kobayashi tells him he told his students on the first day that he was gay, and says that they cannot fire him from a public job just because he is homosexual. The next working day, Toyo asks his supervisor to "gracefully and tactfully" let people know he is gay. At the end of the series, Ida and Hashizume go to visit Ida's parents to "come out" to them. Kobayashi has already told his parents, and Naru promises to be Toyo's supporter when he's ready.

== Publication ==
Originally serialized in Hanaoto magazine, the individual chapters were collected and published in two tankōbon volumes by Houbunsha in March 1996 and February 2000, respectively. Digital Manga Publishing licensed the series for English language release in North America and released the two volumes on March 14, 2007, and July 4, 2007, respectively. The manga is licensed in Taiwan by Sharp Point Press.

== Reception ==
The Moon and the Sandals was nominated by the Young Adult Library Services Association for inclusion on its list of 2008 Great Graphic Novels for Teens. In 2008, Yoshinaga was nominated for the Eisner Award for her work on The Moon and the Sandals and Flower of Life.

Lyle Masaki of AfterElton.com commends the manga for illustrating "the challenges gay men face in Japanese society", and for not following the traditional mode of student-teacher romantic relationships in "Boys Love" titles, opting instead for a friendship where both characters discover more about what it is to be a gay man. Holly Ellingwood at Active Anime commended the first volume its unique artwork, and praised the plot for its "bittersweet" poignancy, and for showing unrequited love rather than being a simplistic story about "winning the guy". She felt the second volume had "unusual pacing" and came off as "abrupt" peeks into the lives of many different couples. Mania.com's Danielle Van Gorder praised the manga for its characterization and ability to reflect reality. Erin Finnegan of Pop Culture Shock criticized the story for Ida and Hachizume adopting each other, essentially getting married, before having sex, which she regarded as unrealistic. Comic World News's David Welsh says that Yoshinaga's characters, even in this early work, have layers, and that it is enjoyable to see how the frank student inspires the adult characters to communicate better. Coolstreak Cartoons's Leroy Douresseaux criticizes the manga for its inability to focus on one couple. Robin Brenner described the plot as being "an engaging meditation on how crushes are wonderful, but oh, how they can hurt." Jason Thompson regarded the story as having been "padded out", but enjoyed the theme of "love and loss" in the manga. Johanna Draper Carlson felt it was novel for the treatment of sex in the first volume to consist of a character making sure they would be able to satisfy their partner. She felt the second volume was strange for being largely sex scenes.
