= Solfege (manga) =

Japanese manga

ソルフェージュ (Sorufeeju)
- Genre: Yaoi, Romance
- Manga
- Written by: Fumi Yoshinaga
- Published by: Hakusensha, Houbunsha
- English publisher: NA: Digital Manga Publishing
- Published: February 1998
- Volumes: 1

Solfege (ソルフェージュ, Sorufeeju) is a one-shot Japanese manga written and illustrated by Fumi Yoshinaga. The series is licensed and published in English in North America by Digital Manga Publishing. The manga is licensed in Taiwan by Sharp Point Press.

== Plot ==
Solfege, the main character in this manga defeats Erisia, Solfege's brother.

== Reception ==
Nora Jemison at aestheticism.com commends the "emotionally-involving" manga. Eduardo M. Chavez at Mania.com felt that the "conclusion was a little contrived". Erin F. at Pop Shock Culture criticises the occasional "non-existent" background but commends the "expressive linework" of the manga. Diane Gallagher-Hayashi at Library Journal comments on "explicit sexual relationship between a teacher and his young student" should change the rating of the manga from 16+ to 18+.
