= Jin (manga) =

Japanese manga series by Motoka Murakami

- Cover of the first volume

JIN-仁-
- Genre: Historical, medical
- Manga
- Written by: Motoka Murakami
- Published by: Shueisha
- English publisher: Motoka Murakami (Patreon)
- Magazine: Super Jump
- Original run: 2000 – November 24, 2010
- Volumes: 20
- Television drama
- Jin (2009, Japan); Dr. Jin (2012, South Korea)

Jin (Japanese: JIN-仁-) is a Japanese manga series written and illustrated by Motoka Murakami, which was featured on Super Jump during its original run from 2000 to 2010. It was compiled into 20 tankōbon volumes by Shueisha and published between April 4, 2001, and February 4, 2011. The manga series has been adapted into three live-action television drama series: two in Japan in 2009 and 2011; and in South Korea in 2012. In 2017, Motoka Murakami self-published his manga series in English on Patreon.

== Plot ==
Jin Minakata, an ordinary brain surgeon, has an accident after his operation with an unidentified patient, and realizes that he has traveled back in time and reached the end of the Edo period. Through an encounter with various historical characters, Jin sets up a small clinic called Jin'yudo and saves those suffering from disease and injury with his medical skills. Along the way, Jin becomes deeply involved in the history of Japan itself.

== Characters ==
- Jin Minakata: Brain surgeon in the present day. Portrayed by Takao Osawa.
- Saki Tachibana: Daughter of samurai family, a crew of Jin'yudo clinic. Portrayed by Haruka Ayase.
- Miki Tomonaga: Pediatrician, Jin's fiancée. Portrayed by Miki Nakatani. Appeared in the TV drama only.
- Nokaze: Oiran who bears an uncanny resemblance to Jin's fiancée. Portrayed by Miki Nakatani.
- Kyotaro Tachibana: Hatamoto, Saki's elder brother. Portrayed by Keisuke Koide.
- Yusuke Saburi: Western doctor, a crew of Jin'yudo clinic. Portrayed by Kenta Kiritani
- Jun'an Yamada: Western doctor, a crew of Jin'yudo clinic. Portrayed by Hiromasa Taguchi.
- Kōan Ogata: President of Western Medical School. Portrayed by Tetsuya Takeda.
- Tatsugorō Shinmon: President of the fireservice. Portrayed by Atsuo Nakamura.
- Ei Tachibana: Widow of samurai family, Kyotaro and Saki's mother. Portrayed by Yumi Asō.
- Rintaro Katsu: Vassal of the Tokugawa shogunate, Kyotaro and Ryoma's boss. Portrayed by Fumiyo Kohinata.
- Sakamoto Ryōma: Loyalist in Tosa Province. Portrayed by Masaaki Uchino.
- Kichinosuke Saigō: Samurai in Satsuma Province. Portrayed by Takahiro Fujimoto.
- Shusuke Higashi: Samurai in Chōshū Province. Portrayed by Ryuta Sato.
- Shintaro Nakaoka: Loyalist in Tosa Province. Portrayed by Kamejiro Ichikawa II.
- Isami Kondo: President of Shinsengumi. Portrayed by Kazufumi Miyazawa.
- Princess Kazu: Wife of 14th shōgun Iemochi. Portrayed by Tomoka Kurokawa.
- Shozan Sakuma: Politician in Matsushiro Domain, professor of Rintaro and Ryoma. Portrayed by Masachika Ichimura.

== Live-action adaptations ==
The manga was first adapted into a Jidaigeki television series Jin, that aired on Japan's Tokyo Broadcasting System from October 11 to December 20, 2009. This was followed by a second season from April 17 to June 26, 2011. It starred Takao Osawa as Minakata Jin, Haruka Ayase, Miki Nakatani, Masaaki Uchino and Tetsuya Takeda.

A South Korean adaptation, television series Dr. Jin aired on Munhwa Broadcasting Corporation from May 26 to August 12, 2012. It starred Song Seung-heon as Jin Hyuk, Park Min-young, Lee Beom-soo, Kim Jaejoong of JYJ and Lee So-yeon.

== Reception ==
It won the Grand Prize at the 2011 Tezuka Osamu Cultural Prize. The manga has published 8 million copies in Japan.
