= Ichigenme... The First Class is Civil Law =

Manga series

- Cover of the first Japanese volume

1限めはやる気の民法 (Ichigenme wa Yaruki no Minpou)
- Genre: Yaoi
- Manga
- Written by: Fumi Yoshinaga
- Published by: Biblos
- English publisher: NA: 801 Media
- Magazine: Magazine Be × Boy
- Original run: July 1998 – March 2002
- Volumes: 2

Ichigenme... The First Class is Civil Law (Japanese: 1限めはやる気の民法, Hepburn: Ichigenme wa Yaruki no Minpou) is a Japanese manga series written and illustrated by Fumi Yoshinaga, about a hard-working scholarship student in a law school who falls for a rich and carefree student.

The series is licensed and published in English in North America by 801 Media. It was also published in Taiwan by Sharp Point Press.

== Reception ==
Casey Brienza at Anime News Network commends Fumi Yoshinaga's use of her "minimalist style and occasionally awkward character designs to their best advantage."

Mania.com's Danielle Van Gorder commends the first volume of the manga's characterization. Mania.com's Danielle Van Gorder commends the second volume of the manga's parallel relationships with the four characters.

Pop Shock Culture's Kasey Chambers comments that Yoshinaga's use of dialogue in her manga is what sets Ichigenme... The First Class is Civil Law apart from other yaoi work.

Library Journal's Krista Hutley commends the manga on its realistic design of the characters with their "long, skinny bodies, large hands, and detailed faces". Holly Ellingwood of Active Anime described it as a "more mature yaoi romance", noting that the story is not "about seduction".

Ginger Mayerson of Sequential Tart was disappointed that the first volume did not share the "wackiness" of Antique Bakery or Flower of Life, describing Ichigenme as "deadly serious". She also notes that Yoshinaga usually has a sympathetic female character in her titles, which is rare for yaoi, but there is no such character in the first volume.

Christopher Butcher of Xtra! notes that the story in the first volume "will draw you in", and the second volume is much more explicit than the first.

In Jason Thompson's online appendix to Manga: The Complete Guide, he describes Yoshinaga as revelling in "the psychological and social associations of homosexuality—and repressed homosexuality".
