= All My Darling Daughters =

Japanese one-shot manga

- Cover of All My Darling Daughters as published by Hakusensha

愛すべき娘たち (Ai Subeki Musume-tachi)
- Genre: Romance
- Manga
- Written by: Fumi Yoshinaga
- Published by: Hakusensha
- English publisher: NA: Viz Media
- Magazine: Melody
- Published: December 19, 2003
- Volumes: 1

All My Darling Daughters (Japanese: 愛すべき娘たち, Hepburn: Ai Subeki Musume-tachi) is a one-shot Japanese manga written and illustrated by Fumi Yoshinaga. It is published by Hakusensha.

It is licensed and published in North America by Viz Media on January 19, 2010. It is licensed in French by Casterman and in Traditional Chinese by Sharp Point Press.

== Reception ==
All My Darling Daughters was a Jury Recommended Work in the 2004 Japan Media Arts Festival.

M. Natali, for BDGest, says that the manga "shows the evolution of the ideals of young girls of today". M. Natali felt the closeup pictures were effective in showing attitudes and emotions but regretted the at times over-long dialogues. The reviewer for Manga News described the story as "sweet and poignant" but not weepy, as there was humour.

Deb Aoki, writing for About.com, says that "we see the life-changing decisions and the complexities of love and family relationships in modern Japan, as only Fumi Yoshinaga (creator of Ooku and Antique Bakery) can tell them". Shaenon Garrity, writing for The Comics Journal, describes the manga as "three generations of mothers and daughters screwing each other up in new and creative ways", and notes that "what goes on between the ears is much wilder, woolier, and scarier than what goes on between the legs".

Marissa Sammy, writing for Sequential Tart, felt the manga was "a hard book to get through, in a way", describing it as being in a "bruised space, where there are no quick and easy answers but instead the love and frustration and responsibility of real life and real relationships". Holly Ellingwood sums up the manga by saying that it's "five moving tales of the relationships of mothers, daughters, and the love that exists between them." Leroy Douresseaux felt that it sometimes felt like a soap opera but that Yoshinaga's insight made the manga "worth reading". Johanna Draper Carlson felt it was "unusual to see family and relationship conflicts of this type in comics, especially portrayed in such a raw fashion with such insight". Michelle Smith describes Yoshinaga's story as "thoughtful, integrated" and noted Yoshinaga's use of closeups to convey emotion. (Note: Smith, Michelle (January 28, 2010). "All My Darling Daughters". Pop Culture Shock. Archived from the original on March 8, 2012. Archived October 13, 2010, at the Wayback Machine)
