= Childhood (Tetsuya Takeda song) =

"Shōnenki"
- First version single cover in 1985

Single by Tetsuya Takeda

from the album Kaze ni Kiita Hanashi
- Language: Japanese
- English title: Childhood
- B-side: "Yume wa Kōya o"
- Released: 1 March 1985
- Genre: Contemporary folk music; anime song
- Label: Polydor Records
- Composer: Yasuo Sako
- Lyricist: Tetsuya Takeda

Tetsuya Takeda singles chronology
"Kisaragi no Kaze no Naka de" (1985)	"Shōnenki" (1985)	"Cosmos" (1985)

"Childhood" (少年期, Shōnenki) is a song by Japanese singer-songwriter Tetsuya Takeda from his third album and the theme song of Doraemon: Nobita's Little Star Wars in 1985. It was released on 1 March 1985 by Polydor Records as the lead single from the album. The song was inspired by Takeda's childhood and his perspective on adulthood at the time.

== Use of the song ==
Takeda wrote the theme songs for the Doraemon films from Doraemon: Nobita's Dinosaur in 1980 to Doraemon: Nobita and the Galaxy Super-express in 1996, and "Childhood" was the first song whose main vocalist is Takeda. (Note: While "The Magical Wind", the theme song of Doraemon: Nobita's Great Adventure into the Underworld, was written by Reiko Yukawa, it was replaced by "So, With Everyone", the theme song written by Takeda for Doraemon: Nobita and the Haunts of Evil in the VHS and DVD releases due to copyright reasons. Most Doraemon albums omit "Kaze no Magical" as well. The theme songs of Doraemon films from 1980 to 1996 are, therefore, written by Takeda in practice.)

Beyond serving as the theme song, "Childhood" is also famously featured in a scene where a character plays it on a guitar in Doraemon: Nobita's Little Star Wars. Despite that, there are differences between the VHS and DVD releases and the theatrical release because sound effects were converted into stereophonic sound in the VHS and DVD releases. (Note: For example, in the theatrical release, there is only guitar music at the beginning, and the song is introduced in the middle; but in the VHS/DVD releases, the sound of a flute can be heard while the character is playing the guitar.) The song's lyrics appeared in a double-page spread in the latter part of the manga. On the page, Doraemon's gang uses a gadget to become invisible while Shizuka and Suneo were operating modified tanks.

The episode "Goodbye to You" (ためしに さようなら, Tameshi ni sayōnara), a remake of "Farewell Nobita" (さよならのび太, Sayōnara Nobita) of the Doraemon anime series, which aired on 1 October 2004, featured "Childhood" as its insert song during a scene where Nobita is walking around his hometown in self-reflection over the moving situation before stumbling onto Shizuka. It was also used in "The annoyance after 7 years" (7年後のなやみ, 7-Nengo no nayami), which aired 1 March 1996.

While the song was not featured in the movie's modern remake, it was featured in one of the advertisements, alongside "Universe" by Official Hige Dandism. One of its lyrics was also tweeted on 22 November 2021.

== Inspiration ==
Takeda described the song in his commentary as "I believe we all have moments when recalling our childhood, while gradually sinking into a melancholic mood and start losing ourselves for a while; I want to turn these vivid scenes into my song." (Note: Japanese: 子どものときのことをじっとおもいだしているうちにメランコリックな気持ちになり、しばらくの間ひたってしまう時間が誰にでもあると思いますが、そんなときによみがえってくる情景を歌にしたい)

Takeda's difficult childhood inspired the song. He grew up in Hakata, when everything was still poor in post-war times, and his parents "fought about money all the time". Their fight reached its peak on his father's payday, when the drunken father fought about money with his mother. Takeda, who cannot do almost everything at the time, can only go to local parks where he doesn't have to listen to all the fights. When seeing incandescent lamps, which were still rare in his childhood, Takeda saw a kaleidoscope-like rainbow from his tears. According to Takeda, it was his way to comfort himself when he was seven years old. He also realised that he would become a factory worker like his father during that time, and "felt so anxious" that he "wanted to be a child forever". These "personal memories" have therefore formed the song's first part, in addition to express "the intrinsic sorrow well of children". In the second part, he remembered the feeling of waking up to an empty home, and therefore built the part. For the refrain, Takeda commented that:

"Why did we grow up? When did we grow up?" The questions in the lyrics point to the uncertainties we face while growing up. It overlaps with our adolescent wishes – that wanting to grow up while still wanting to remain a child, or even refusing to become an adult. I believe these hesitations align with what Doraemon's world want to convey. (Note: Japanese: どうして大人になるのか、いつ頃大人になるのか、という詞は、成長していく自分の得体のしれなさですよね。早く大きくなりたい、と思うんだけど、子供でいたい、大人を拒否したいという二次成長期の願望に重なる思いですよね。そのような何かがドラえもんの世界と重なるんじゃないかな、と思ったんです。)

== Reception ==
The song received universal acclaim from the Doraemon fandom. In a survey conducted by Shogakukan in the seventh issue of Boku, Doraemon, the song ranked 1st in readers' voting of the best Doraemon film theme songs. Takeda himself expressed that "Childhood" is his favourite theme song among all Doraemon films.

According to his interview in the Sports Hochi, Takeda stated that Fujiko F. Fujio, author of Doraemon, was delighted by the song and praised his talent after reading the lyrics. Takeda believed that his compliment could be traced back to his nostalgia for Hokuriku, where he had a rough childhood as well. The Sports Hochi also praised the song as "The best song that rarely appeared in Doraemon's history."

== Track listing ==
"Shōnenki" track listing
No.	Title	Writer(s)	Length
1.	"Shōnenki" (少年期)	Tetsuya Takeda; Yasuo Sako; Nobuyuki Sakuraba
2.	"Yume wa Kōya o" (夢は荒野を)	Tetsuya Takeda; Yasuo Sako; Toshio Nakamuta

== Other albums ==
On Tetsuya Takeda
Kaze ni Kiita Hanashi (風に聞いた話) (1985)
Tōi Gentō (遠い幻燈) (1986)
Takeda Tetsuya Zenkyoku-shū (武田鉄矢全曲集) (1988)
Takeda Tetsuya Best Selection (1990)
On Doraemon
Kumo ga Yuku no wa (雲がゆくのは) (1992)
Doraemon Eiga Shudaika-shū (ドラえもん映画主題歌集) (1995)
Eiga Doraemon 25-shūnen Doraemon Eiga Shudaika-hen (映画ドラえもん25周年 ドラえもん映画主題歌篇) (2004)
Doraemon Eiga Shudaika-shū + Sōnyū Uta (ドラえもん 映画主題歌集+挿入歌) (2010)
Eiga Doraemon Uta no Taizen-shū (映画 ドラえもん うたの大全集) (2020)

== Covers ==
- Takashi Kondō, listed in A Little Wonder in 2008
- Haruka Tomatsu, as an insert song of Un-Go in 2011. The full version was later listed on its DVD/Blu-ray Disc in 2012.
- M.O.E., (Note: Member: Wataru Hatano and Takuma Terashima) listed in Oretachi no Uta o Kiku CD (俺たちの歌を聴くCD) in 2011
