= Gerard & Jacques =

Japanese manga series

- Cover of the first volume of the English edition

ジェラールとジャック (Gerard to Jacques)
- Genre: Shōnen-ai, Drama, Historical
- Manga
- Written by: Fumi Yoshinaga
- English publisher: NA: Blu Manga
- Magazine: Be × Boy Gold
- Original run: 2000 – 2001
- Volumes: 2

Gerard & Jacques (ジェラールとジャック, Gerard to Jacques) is a Japanese shōnen-ai manga written by Fumi Yoshinaga. It first has been published in English by Blu Manga, the boys love publishing division of Tokyopop.

== Storyline ==
Volume One

The story begins when Jacques, a young man, is sold to a high-class brothel. His first and last patron is an older man named Gerard, a wealthy noble. Soon after, Gerard buys Jacques' freedom to force the boy to live a life that wasn't pampered, as his previous years had been. Jacques surprises Gerard by appearing at the novelist's home (unaware of the owner) and asked for a job on the premises. As the two live together they begin to see something more in each other than previously thought.

Volume Two

Several years later, Jacques has risen from Gerard's houseboy to secretary and assistant. Their relationship also grows with the ups and downs that come from their separate positions in life. But with the possibility of the French Revolution in the air, and Jacques' family coming to claim him, their relationship is in for a rough ride.

== Reception ==
Anime News Network described the first volume as unromantic. A 40-year-old male reviewer for IGN who identifies as straight found the first volume confrontingly graphic in its depiction of sex. Holly Ellingwood for Active Anime stated that the costumes, and setting "captured" the era of Revolutionary France very well. Jason Thompson's 2007 'The Complete Guide: Manga' rated it four out of four stars, stating that "Excellent characterization and dialogue drive the plot..." and that it is "highly recommended"
