= Musashi no Ken =

Japanese manga and anime series

- Cover of the 24th volume

六三四の剣
- Genre: Coming-of-age, sports
- Manga
- Written by: Motoka Murakami
- Published by: Shogakukan
- Imprint: Shōnen Sunday Comics
- Magazine: Weekly Shōnen Sunday
- Original run: April 8, 1981 – September 25, 1985
- Volumes: 24
- Anime television series
- Directed by: Toshitaka Tsunoda
- Produced by: Hyouta Ezu (TV Tokyo)
- Music by: Hidemi Sakashita
- Studio: Eiken (Note: Production assistance provided by Sunshine Corporation and Hadashi Pro)
- Original network: TV Tokyo
- Original run: April 18, 1985 – September 26, 1986
- Episodes: 72
- Video game

Musashi no Ken – Tadaima Shugyō Chū
- Publisher: Taito
- Genre: Platform
- Platform: Famicom
- Released: August 8, 1986
- Video game

Typing Shinken Shoubu: Musashi no Ken
- Publisher: Racjin / Sunsoft
- Genre: Typing / Action
- Platform: PlayStation 2
- Released: January 1, 2002

Musashi no Ken (六三四の剣; lit. 'Musashi's Sword') is a Japanese sports manga series written and illustrated by Motoka Murakami that focuses on kendo. It was serialized by Shogakukan in Weekly Shōnen Sunday between April 1981 and October 1985. Musashi no Ken received the 1984 Shogakukan Manga Award for shōnen manga.

The manga was adapted as a 72-episode anime television series by Eiken.

The manga was also adapted into a Famicom platform game called Musashi no Ken – Tadaima Shugyō Chū (六三四の剣 ただいま修行中; lit. 'Sword of Musashi - Now in the Middle of Training'). The game was developed and published by Taito. It was released in Japan on August 8, 1986.

== Plot ==
The manga tells the story of Musashi Natsuki, an aspired kendō swordsman. He was born to Eiichirō and Kayo Natsuki, in Iwate Prefecture of the Northeast region. Both his parents were acclaimed kendō swordsmen, especially his father Eiichirō who was nationally famous. After Eiichirō's death accidentally caused by his rival Kunihiko Tōdō's tsuki, Musashi vowed to defeat Kunihiko one day. Unfortunately, Kunihiko retired from kendo out of guilt, and Musashi then aimed to beat his son Shura Tōdō instead. There was no hard feeling between them, however, and they remained good friends. Musashi trained hard as a child under the guidance of his mother Kayo, who had retired from professional kendō and now only did her day job as a full-time grade school teacher at Musashi's school, but he also got more practice from the local dojo with Ranko Todoroki, who later became one of his closest friends.

From volume 13, after Musashi finally defeated Shura at the national championship, the story jumped forward to when Musashi was 15 and the "Youth Series" (青春編, Seishunhen; a new "arc" for the time when Musashi was no longer a headstrong kid) started. Musashi went to Kaiyō High and met new friends and stronger fellow kendō swordsmen. But during the time there, he realized his shortcomings, and wanted to be stronger and learn more from various schools of kendō in Japan. Thanks to Kayo's words of encouragement, he made up his mind, halted his high school education, traveled from dojo to dojo and challenged their best swordsmen, just like his legendary namesake Miyamoto Musashi did (he even learned Miyamoto Musashi's double-katana technique from a reclusive old man and tailored it to suit his kendō), until he was ready to face off very strong opponents at the final national championship.

The story takes place in the Northeast region, therefore the characters spoke their local dialect and accent, and furigana is frequently used to gloss obscure dialectal words.

== Characters ==
Musashi Natsuki (夏木 六三四, Natsuki Musashi)
The protagonist. Born on June 3 at 4 (the "sixth" (mu) month, the "third" (sa) day, "four" (shi) AM), he started out as a headstrong and kid who was taught kendo by his beloved father at a very young age. For the most part of his childhood, he never backed down from a duel and refused to give up even when he got beaten up. After his father's death, he was determined to perfect his tsuki in order to beat Shura and become the strongest swordsman in Japan. During the Youth Arc, he traveled to schools of kendo to better his skills and experience various styles of kendo.
Kayo Natsuki (夏木 佳代, Natsuki Kayo)
Musashi's mother. She was known as one of the strongest and most acclaimed swordswomen in the Northeast region. Unlike Musashi's easy-going father, she was strict on his upbringing, especially after his father died. She helped with his practice at times, and coaching his team for the adolescent championship. She taught at Musashi's school as a day job and retired from kendo for a while. She encouraged Musashi to travel in the Youth Arc. With Musashi's encouragement, she practiced kendo again for one last championship, during which Musashi finally approved of her remarrying her coworker and his former teacher, Mikio Yaegashi, which he had hoped her not to do as a kid because of his love for his late father.
Eiichirō Natsuki (夏木 栄一郎, Natsuki Eiichirō)
Musashi's father. He was a full-time salaryman, but also one of the strongest swordsmen nationally. He was easy-going and a bit of an alcoholic, but he sincerely loved his wife and son. He was capable of fending off muggers with just a toothpick as his "sword", and very quickly slicing holes through a waterfall. Despite his various accolades, he was determined to beat his eternal rival Kunihiko Tōdō, whose tsuki proved deadly and cost him his life. But even in death, he never stopped inspiring his son Musashi to be the strongest swordsman.
Toichi (十一)
Musashi's dog. He was an abandoned puppy who seemed to be as headstrong as Musashi, and was adopted by Eiichirō to keep Musashi's company. He somehow got into a fight with feral dogs, but thankfully got saved by Musashi, although the fight resulted in Musashi critically injured and Toichi blind in his right eye forever. Toichi could understand human speak, and always ran along with Musashi for exercise during his childhood. He also had puppies with another dog without his family's knowledge, although one of them froze to death due to Ranko's neglectful adoption.
Shura Tōdō (東堂 修羅, Tōdō Shura)
Musashi's first rival. He was very well-mannered being raised by a strict father. When Musashi tried to challenge his father and failed, he told him that only he could defeat his own father, and also promised to duel Musashi at the championship. He was, unfortunately, beaten twice by Musashi (both times during the final duel of a national championship, the second one is at the end of the series) even though he had really great potential as an almost unbeatable swordsman, and felt guilty that he failed his late mother for whom he fought. Shura is apparently named after Asura (exact same Japanese pronunciation and spelling) for some reason; this fact was highlighted only once, when Mr. Yaegashi's mentioned the title of Kenji Miyazawa's Spring and Asura (Haru to Shura) in his class and caught Musashi's attention while he was otherwise being bored out of his mind.
Kunihiko Tōdō (東堂 国彦, Tōdō Kunihiko)
Shura's strict father and Eiichirō's rival. He was in sharp contrast to Eiichirō's easy-going personality, in that he always appeared stiff and formal. His abusive way of training Shura kept his wife up at night because she always felt sorry for her son, which was the bane of their marriage. Kunihiko's tsuki was deadly, being able to pierce through hard wood at full force, and it is this tsuki that killed Eiichirō, whom he deeply respected.
Asaka Tōdō (東堂 朝香, Tōdō Asaka)
Shura's mother. Shura's memory with his beloved mother was always what kept him going. Despite his stiff demeanor and abusive method, her husband really loved her and accepted her slapping as a punishment for his inability to express sympathy.
Ranko Todoroki (轟 嵐子, Todoroki Ranko)
One of the few notable swordswomen in the series. Ranko had a lot of similarities with Musashi as headstrong kids who refused to back down. She was one of the few lesser swordsmen that could hold up against Musashi, and also his first female opponent ever. When Musashi moved to her town and obliterated her dojo, she was the only one who could fight him for long. After Musashi joined the dojo, she frequently got into fights with Musashi every time she lost, but they made good teammates. As Ranko got older and more feminine in the Youth Arc, she started to develop feelings for Musashi and ended up being with him.
Kensuke Hidaka (日高 剣介, Hidaka Kensuke)
A Kagoshima ("Kagomma" in his accent) resident, who followed the brutal and powerful Jigen style of kendo. Musashi got to know more about the tanned boy who beat him after his exhausting triumph at the national championship during his stay in Kagoshima, where he showed him how tenacious Kagoshima swordsmen could be with their practice routine.
Shun'ichi Inui (乾 俊一, Inui Shun'ichi)
One of Musashi's opponents, who saved Ranko from the gang that got Musha suspended after his fight with them along with Musashi. He was a wealthy boy, but actually a strong swordsman and not a bad, typical spoiled rich boy. However, the duel with Musashi resulted in his left arm broken, and permanently losing strength even if it recovers, which made him hate Musashi, and Musashi feel responsible. When Musashi learned about the dual-wielding technique by the legendary samurai Miyamoto Musashi from a reclusive old man, he told Monami to give Inui a hint. With this technique that doesn't rely on the raw strength of a single arm, Inui was inspired to practice kendo again.
Monami Komiya (小宮 もなみ, Komiya Monami)
Musashi's childhood sweetheart, with a mole on her glabella. As a kid, she crushed on Musashi and wanted to be his future wife. It took a long time since Musashi moved away from Iwate until they met again when he went to high school. She later empathized more and more with Inui (who almost raped her to revenge on Musashi) and his situation, and became more supportive of his determination.
Kiyokazu Musha (武者 潔和, Musha Kiyokazu)
A skilled sophomore swordsman and Musashi's perverted roommate. Despite his skills, he frequently slacked off, and at one time even brought Musashi on a "special crash course" to peep on girls in short skirts playing tennis, which helped Musashi reunite with Monami. He was actually a gangster, but decided to give up the delinquent lifestyle in pursuit of education. He helped Musashi fend off his old gang while they surrounded Musashi and Monami on their date and got suspended as a result, but thanks to Inui's influence, he was forgiven.

== Media ==
=== Manga ===
Musashi no Ken is written and illustrated by Motoka Murakami and serialized in Weekly Shōnen Sunday from April 8, 1981, to September 25, 1985. The individual chapters of the manga were collected into 24 tankōbon volumes published by Shogakukan between October 20, 1981, and November 18, 1985. The series was re-released in 11 volumes between May 16, 1992, and January 14, 1994, then again in 10 tankōbon volumes between November 16, 2000, and July 17, 2001.

=== Anime ===
The manga was adapted into an anime television series by Eiken, directed by Toshitaka Tsunoda. It was broadcast in 72 episodes on TV Tokyo between April 18, 1985, and September 26, 1986. The episodes were released by Geneon Universal Entertainment over 13 DVDs between February 25, 2004, and July 28, 2004. 3 DVD boxes containing all 72 episodes were released by Geneon between February 25, 2004, and July 28, 2004.

The opening theme is "Hadashi no Soldier" (裸足のソルジャー; lit. 'Barefoot Soldier') by Kousuke Shimoyama, and the ending theme "Otoko-tachi no Chizu" (男たちの地図; lit. 'Men's Map') by Kousuke Shinoyama.

=== Video game ===
Game cover art

Musashi no Ken - Tadaima Shugyō Chū (六三四の剣 ただいま修行中, lit. 'Sword of Musashi - Now in the Middle of Training') is a 1986 video game developed and published by Taito in Japan. The gameplay and design in the one-on-one fighting parts resemble Taito's other fighting game, Great Swordsman, especially its kendo mode.

There are two different modes: single player and two player VS. mode. On single player mode, the player depicts Musashi in the middle of his training. He must run through several obstacle courses collecting swords and other items along the way. At the same time, his pet Akita will be running the course behind him. Musashi must not fall too far behind his dog. After completing three courses, Musashi will be entered into a 2D weapon-based versus fighting-style Kendo tournament. He must defeat five competitors to win the tournament. The swords that Musashi collects during the obstacle courses provide him with access to special strike moves if he has collected enough. If the player succeeds in winning, the game will continue from the beginning at a higher level of difficulty. After winning the championship a second time, the game is over.

On two player vs. mode, each player selects from a roster of competitors, and selects them secretly by pressing different inputs on the control pad. The selections are revealed once five selections have been made. Each player then squares off in a Kendo match with each of their selections. Whoever gets three or more victories wins the game.

== Reception ==
Anime News Network's Justin Sevakis commends the unusual realism of the anime, stating "it refuses to sugar-coat the awful, dangerous and sad aspects of life, but attacks them with a smile, a sense of humor, and a resolute strength that's incredibly inspiring." He also commends the setting of the anime in "the idyllic small cities and towns among Iwate Prefecture, the poetry of Kenji Miyazawa is often invoked, giving a strong sense of peace and nature that we seldom think of in anime."
