= Doraemon: Nobita's Little Star Wars =

1985 film by Tsutomu Shibayama

Doraemon the Movie: Nobita's Little Star Wars
- Theatrical release poster

Japanese name
- Kanji: ドラえもん: のび太の宇宙小戦争(リトル スター ウォズ)
Transcriptions
- Revised Hepburn: Doraemon: Nobita no Ritoru Sutā Wōzu
- Directed by: Tsutomu Shibayama
- Screenplay by: Fujiko Fujio
- Based on: Doraemon's Long Tales: Noby's Little Space War by Fujiko Fujio
- Produced by: Junichi Kimura; Masami Hatano; Sōichi Besshi; Yoshiaki Koizumi
- Starring: Nobuyo Ōyama; Noriko Ohara; Michiko Nomura; Kaneta Kimotsuki; Kazuya Tatekabe; Keiko Han; Yuji Mitsuya; Dai Kanai; Nobuo Yana; Yuusaku Yara
- Edited by: Kazuo Inoue
- Music by: Shunsuke Kikuchi
- Production company: Shin-Ei Animation
- Distributed by: Toho
- Release date: 16 March 1985
- Running time: 98 minutes
- Country: Japan
- Language: Japanese
- Box office: $18.7 million

Doraemon: Nobita's Little Star Wars (ドラえもん: のび太の宇宙小戦争(リトル スター ウォズ), Doraemon: Nobita no Ritoru Sutā Wōzu) is a 1985 Japanese animated epic space opera film. It is a feature-length Doraemon film which premiered in Japan on March 16, 1985. As the film's title suggests, it is a parody of George Lucas' original Star Wars trilogy, with a few elements from his 1983 film Return of the Jedi. The film is directed by Tsutomu Shibayama. The theme song of this film, "Shōnenki", is performed by Tetsuya Takeda. It is the 6th Doraemon film. A modern remake of the film, Doraemon: Nobita's Little Star Wars 2021, released in theaters on March 4th, 2022.

== Plot ==
The film begins with a prologue of a battle on a faraway planet, where the president is evacuated on a rocket. The film shifts to the Earth, where Nobita is kicked out by Gian and Suneo after destroying the set of the space movie they are making. Nobita runs to Doraemon and the two recruit Shizuka to make their own film.

During filming, Nobita finds what looks like a toy rocket. Later that night, Nobita and Doraemon discover a tiny smart humanoid alien Papi in their room. Papi explains that there is a dangerous enemy searching for him. Nobita, Doraemon and Shizuka assure him that he will be safe in their home, and they play together using Doraemon's Small Light to shrink themselves to Papi's size.

Meanwhile, a whale-shaped spaceship destroys Suneo's new set and Suneo and Gian confronts Nobita at his house, but Papi explains that it was a battleship sent by PCIA to find him. He reveals that he is the president of his planet Pirika, which has been taken over by the dictator Gilmore. The PCIA is the dictator's intelligence agency, and they have been sent to capture Papi to ensure Gilmore's total victory.

Nobita and friends hide Papi in a secret base made by one of Doraemon's gadget in Shizuka's home. The PCIA battleship manages to infiltrate the base and kidnaps Shizuka, as well as stealing the Small Light and prevent the children from returning to their normal size. Dorakoruru, the head of PCIA, leaves a message demanding Papi in exchange for Shizuka's freedom and life. Papi leaves alone to surrender in while the children rewire Suneo's model tanks for flight and combat. Papi's pet dog Rokoroko arrives, but is too late to save him. The dog and Shizuka return to the others, and together they plan to travel to Pirika using the same rocket in which Papi came to Earth.

Near Pirika, Nobita and friends arrive at a secret base located in the planet's ring. Army chief Genbu explains that Papi is being held in the PCIA's head office, facing a death sentence. Doraemon, Nobita and Gian head to the planet with Rokoroko, while Shizuka and Suneo remain to defend the base from the PCIA space force. Nobita's group meets with a resistance group, but everyone gets captured by PCIA soldiers after being traced down by Gilmore's cameras. After heading to the planet's surface in their tanks, Shizuka and Suneo are shot down as well. While their tanks sink into the ocean, they both suddenly start returning to their normal sizes.

At the PCIA headquarters, Nobita, Doraemon, Gian, Papi and Rokoroko are all about to be executed by firing squad, but suddenly Dorakoruru receives news that giant Earthlings have been spotted. After realizing that the Small Light's effects have expired, Nobita, Doraemon and Gian return to their normal size and reunite with Shizuka and Suneo. They battle with the PCIA forces. Dorakoruru attacks them in his battleship, but Gian single-handedly takes it down and causes it to crash into the ocean. Meanwhile, Gilmore attempts to flee but is stopped by a mass of citizens rallying together, causing him to surrender.

Nobita and his friends say goodbye to the residents of Pirika and head back to Earth. On the way, they talk about going back to visit Pirika again the next week. The ending credits show snippets of their later visits.

== Cast ==
An English version produced and released exclusively in Malaysia by Speedy Video, features an unknown voice cast.

Character	Japanese voice actor
Doraemon	Nobuyo Ōyama
Nobita Nobi	Noriko Ohara
Shizuka Minamoto	Michiko Nomura
Suneo Honekawa	Kaneta Kimotsuki
Takeshi "Gian" Gōda	Kazuya Tatekabe
Tamako Nobi	Sachiko Chijimatsu
Michiko Minamoto	Masako Matsubara
Papi	Keiko Han
Rokoroko	Yuji Mitsuya
Xuanwu	Dai Kanai
Gilmore	Nobuo Yana
Freedom Alliance members	Sho Hayami; Masayuki Katō; Masaharu Satō; Bin Shimada; Yoku Shioya; Junichi Sugawara
Stray Black Cat	Keiko Han
PCIA Soldier	Ryusei Nakao
Dorakoruru	Yuusaku Yara

== See also ==
- List of Doraemon films
