= Don't Say Anymore, Darling =

Japanese manga

- Cover of the English-language edition.

それを言ったらおしまいよ (Sore o Ittara Oshimai Yo)
- Genre: Yaoi, Romance
- Manga
- Written by: Fumi Yoshinaga
- Published by: Ohta Publishing
- English publisher: NA: Digital Manga Publishing
- Published: January 24, 2004
- Volumes: 1

Don't Say Anymore, Darling (それを言ったらおしまいよ, Sore o Ittara Oshimai Yo) is a one-shot Japanese manga written and illustrated by Fumi Yoshinaga.

The series is licensed and published in English in North America by Digital Manga Publishing under its June imprint.

== Manga ==
Ohta Publishing released the manga on January 24, 2004. Digital Manga Publishing, under its June imprint, released the manga on July 25, 2007.

== Reception ==
Holly Ellingwood at Active Anime commends the manga for its "diversity, beautiful artwork, and imaginative romances of various kinds". Pop Culture Shock's Erin F. comments on the increasing "weirder and more depressing" shorts stories as the book progresses. Mania.com's Danielle Van Gorder commends the manga's art and panel layout which are "overall very minimalist, with sparse backgrounds where they are included at all, and fairly simple screentones, but it's a style that is used to great effect".
