= Tamaki & Amane =

Japanese manga series by Fumi Yoshinaga

- Cover of the volume

環と周 (Tamaki to Amane)
- Genre: Historical; Romance
- Manga
- Written by: Fumi Yoshinaga
- Published by: Shueisha
- English publisher: NA: Yen Press
- Imprint: Margaret Comics
- Magazine: Cocohana
- Original run: November 28, 2022 – July 28, 2023
- Volumes: 1

Tamaki & Amane (Japanese: 環と周, Hepburn: Tamaki to Amane) is a Japanese manga series written and illustrated by Fumi Yoshinaga. It was serialized in Shueisha's josei manga magazine Cocohana from November 2022 to July 2023, with its chapters compiled into one volume released in October 2023.

== Synopsis ==
The series is centered around two people, Tamaki and Amane, and their multiple shared past lives together.

== Publication ==
Written and illustrated by Fumi Yoshinaga, Tamaki & Amane was serialized in Shueisha's josei manga magazine Cocohana from November 28, 2022, to July 28, 2023. Its chapters were compiled into a single tankōbon volume on October 23, 2023.

During their panel at New York Comic Con 2024, Yen Press announced that they had licensed the series and would release the volume in April 2025.

No.	Original release date	Original ISBN	North American release date	North American ISBN
1	October 23, 2023	978-4-08-844839-8	April 22, 2025	979-8-8554-0177-6
Stories 1–5; Epilogue

== Reception ==
The series was placed seventh in "The Best Manga 2024 Kono Manga wo Yome!" ranking by Freestyle magazine. The series was nominated for the 17th Manga Taishō and was placed eighth with 49 points. It was also nominated for the Grand Prize at the 28th Tezuka Osamu Cultural Prize. It was also ranked tenth in the 2024 Da Vinci Book of the Year Ranking. It topped the 2025 edition of Takarajimasha's Kono Manga ga Sugoi! guidebook's list of the best manga for female readers. It won in the Best One-Shot Manga Series category at Japan Society and Anime NYC's second American Manga Awards in 2025.
