= Akai Pegasus =

Japanese manga series

- First volume cover

赤いペガサス (Akai Pegasasu)
- Manga
- Written by: Motoka Murakami
- Published by: Shogakukan
- Imprint: Shōnen Sunday Comics
- Magazine: Weekly Shōnen Sunday
- Original run: June 22, 1977 – September 5, 1979
- Volumes: 14

Akai Pegasus (Japanese: 赤いペガサス, Hepburn: Akai Pegasasu; lit. "Red Pegasus"), is a Japanese manga series written and illustrated by Motoka Murakami. It was serialized in Shogakukan's Weekly Shōnen Sunday from June 1975 to September 1977.

== Plot ==
Ken Akaba is a top-rank stock-car driver who was involved in a horrific accident, which killed 6 spectators. He was badly hurt, but he survived and promised his younger sister that he would give up racing. He goes to America to help his father develop a new Formula 1 racer, but in the testing the car runs at speeds that set records—so the pressure is on for him to return to racing, this time in the F-1 circuit. He has supporters, but there are also those who do not want him to come back, including those who caused the original crash.

== Manga ==
Akai Pegasus is written and illustrated by Motoka Murakami. It was serialized in Shogakukan's shōnen manga magazine Weekly Shōnen Sunday from June 22, 1977, to September 5, 1979. The series was collected into fourteen tankōbon volumes published by Shogakukan from October 24, 1977, to January 24, 1980.

=== Volume list ===
No.	Japanese release date	Japanese ISBN
1	October 24, 1977	978-4-09-120261-1
2	February 23, 1978	978-4-09-120262-8
3	April 18, 1978	978-4-09-120263-5
4	July 21, 1978	978-4-09-120264-2
5	September 16, 1978	978-4-09-120265-9
6	December 18, 1978	978-4-09-120266-6
7	March 24, 1979	978-4-09-120267-3
8	May 19, 1979	978-4-09-120268-0
9	August 22, 1979	978-4-09-120269-7
10	September 20, 1979	978-4-09-120270-3
11	October 22, 1979	978-4-09-120371-7
12	November 22, 1979	978-4-09-120372-4
13	December 20, 1979	978-4-09-120373-1
14	January 24, 1980	978-4-09-120374-8
