= Doraemon: Nobita's Little Star Wars 2021 =

2022 film by Susumu Yamaguchi

Doraemon the Movie: Nobita's Little Star Wars 2021
- Theatrical release poster

Japanese name
- Kanji: ドラえもん: のび太 の 宇宙小戦争(リトル スター ウォーズ) 2021
Transcriptions
- Revised Hepburn: Doraemon: Nobita no Ritoru Sutā Wōzu 2021
- Directed by: Susumu Yamaguchi
- Screenplay by: Dai Satō
- Based on: Doraemon Long Stories: Nobita's Little Star Wars by Fujiko F. Fujio
- Produced by: Aarav ogra
- Starring: Wasabi Mizuta; Megumi Ohara; Yumi Kakazu; Tomokazu Seki; Subaru Kimura; Romi Park; Mayu Matsuoka; Yuki Kaji; Junichi Suwabe; Teruyuki Kagawa
- Music by: Takayuki Hattori
- Production company: Shin-Ei Animation
- Distributed by: Toho
- Release date: March 4, 2022
- Running time: 108 minutes
- Country: Japan
- Language: Japanese
- Box office: $22.1 million

Doraemon: Nobita's Little Star Wars 2021 (ドラえもん: のび太の 宇宙小戦争(リトル スター ウォーズ) 2021, Doraemon: Nobita no Ritoru Sutā Wōzu 2021) is a 2022 Japanese animated epic space opera film. It is the 41st Doraemon film and serves as a remake of the 1985 film Doraemon: Nobita's Little Star Wars.

== Plot ==
During summer vacation, Nobita and his friends begin making a sci-fi film on space war using a diorama at Suneo's house. After feeling left out, Nobita discovers a tiny rocket containing Papi, the president of Planet Pirika, who is fleeing a rebel army led by General Gilmore and his agent Dorakoruru. Doraemon and the others befriend Papi and use the "Small Light" to shrink themselves and play with him, deepening their bond. When Papi's location is discovered, they travel to Pirika to help the Freedom Alliance resist the dictatorship. Despite all being captured and separated, the friends reunite when the Small Light's effect wears off, returning to full size and rallying the people. Together, they defeat Dorakoruru, stop Gilmore, and restore peace again to Pirika. Back on Earth, they screen their finished space war film, hinting that it was based on their real adventure.

== Cast ==
Character	Japanese voice actor
Doraemon	Wasabi Mizuta
Nobita Nobi	Megumi Ōhara
Shizuka Minamoto	Yumi Kakazu
Suneo Honekawa	Tomokazu Seki
Takeshi "Gian" Gōda	Subaru Kimura
Papi	Romi Park
Piina	Mayu Matsuoka
Rokoroko	Yuki Kaji
Dorakoruru	Junichi Suwabe
Gilmore	Teruyuki Kagawa
Underground leader	Takashi Utsumi (Milk Boy)
Pilot	Takashi Komaba (Milk Boy)
Tamako Nobi (Nobita's mother)	Kotono Mitsuishi
Michiko Minamoto (Shizuka's mother)	Ai Orikasa
Hidetoshi Dekisugi	Shihoko Hagino

== Soundtrack ==
- Universe: Official Hige Dandism
- Thank you for the heart (ココロありがとう, Kokoro Arigatō) (Insert song): Billy BanBan

== Staff ==
- Original: Fujiko F. Fujio
- Director: Susumu Yamaguchi
- Screenplay: Dai Satō
- Character design: Koichi Maruyama
- Mechanical design: Junya Ishigaki
- Music: Takayuki Hattori
- Production companies: Shin-Ei Animation, Shirogumi, TV Asahi and ADK

== Production ==
=== Development ===
Kazuaki Imai, who directed the previous Doraemon feature film Nobita's New Dinosaur, was replaced by Susumu Yamaguchi. Yamaguchi stated, "I used to participate only in drawing, but it was over. However, I thought, I want to make a Doraemon film before I die. So I took the initiative and acted under the name of the 'five-year plan.'" He had previously worked on the production of TV specials and movies and appealed to the production team to direct this film. As a result, he was eventually chosen. However, because the production of an original film was difficult due to the schedules, Yamaguchi decided to remake Nobita's Little Star Wars. According to Yamaguchi, Nobita and the Castle of the Undersea Devil was also recommended, but was not finalized because of the difficulty to animate underwater scenes.

Dai Satō wrote the screenplay of the film, who has worked on many works including the science fiction anime series Cowboy Bebop. Yamaguchi said that he was glad with the screenplay.

Koichi Maruyama was selected from the TV series for character design, and Junya Ishigaki was in charge of mechanical design.

=== Screenwriting ===
Sato had written his own plot to make the remake compatible to the 2020s age. After that, it had turned out that director Susumu Yamaguchi had also written a plot based on similar changes. Therefore, the two decided to pursue the character of Papi, the guest character of this work. In the original story, Papi was separated from Nobita and others by PCIA in the first half of the story, but since it was not possible to show the interaction between Papi and Nobita and Papi's feeling about it, Sato had consulted with Yamaguchi and had decided to write the first half of the original shorter. For the same reason, Papi's older sister Piina had been introduced as a new character. In addition, the original Papi was depicted as "an intelligent life form far superior to earthlings," which was slightly changed in the remake to make it compatible to the modern times. For this reason, a scene in which Papi becomes emotionally angry was included.

For characters other than Papi, a deep digging of the character was done. For example, in the case of Suneo, he was portrayed as a representative of the majority of people who want to be brave enough to do heroic things, but they only keep things to themselves. Also, in the original work, Suneo showed a war-weary attitude which remained in the remake, but scenes were increased where Suneo was reluctant to fight. Mayu Matsuoka, who voiced Piina, said in a stage greeting on 27 March 2022 that she had been encouraged by Suneo's honest expression of his fear of fighting.

On the other hand, Nobita had been depicted clumsy sometimes because they thought he could be "too heroic".

In addition, in the original manga, the defeat of Gilmore by the public was easily drawn in one page. Sato said that he had focused on Gilmore's coronation ceremony, which had been only mentioned in the original manga, while it had been difficult to come up with a good idea, although it had lacked balance if he followed the depiction of the final stage because he had strengthened other part.

Gilmore's coronation ceremony had been set with Papi's death penalty, and the content of Papi's speech was based on his interaction with Nobita and others. Also Papi's scream to Gilmore in the original was the scene when the death sentence was announced, but since the public did not witness the scene and it looked like a loser's howl, in the remake it was changed to Gilmore's coronation ceremony, which led the public to an uprising.

=== Casting ===
Among the guest voice actors, Mayu Matsuoka was selected as Papi's older sister, Piina. In an interview with Animate Times, Yamaguchi revealed that when he heard Matsuoka's first line, 'Doracoluru', he felt that Matsuoka was a good choice. In addition, the leader of the underground organization and the pilot of the Free Alliance, who were collaborators of Doraemon and others, were played by the comedy duo Milk Boy, Takashi Utsumi and Takashi Komaba respectively. In an interview with the Animate Times, Yamaguchi said that the two characters in the play are not comedy relief, but rather young people who are desperate to save their nation. Teruyuki Kagawa was appointed as Gilmore, the dictator of the planet Pirika. Yamaguchi revealed in an interview with Animate Times that he had asked Kagawa to play "the most hated person" in a letter. He also said that Kagawa was acting with his body and gestures. Romi Park, Yuki Kaji and Junichi Suwabe were selected as Papi, Rokoroko and Dorakoruru respectively.

=== Visual effects ===
Care was taken to keep the character designs close to the original, but not too old-fashioned. Also, in the remake, as a form of respect for special effects films of the 20th century, real miniatures were used as part of the background in some scenes, the first time in the Doraemon film series.

== Promotion ==
On November 16, 2020, it was announced that the film would be released on March 5, 2021. Major staff and the artist of theme song were also announced. On January 9, 2021, the theme song "Universe" by Official Hige Dandism was published on the pop band's YouTube channel. The release date of the film got postponed indefinitely due to the COVID-19 pandemic on January 29, 2021. After almost six months, on July 17, 2021, it was announced that the film would release in early 2022. On November 9, 2021, the new release date of March 4, 2022, was announced and guest voice actors were announced for the characters of Piina and Gilmore. After nine days, on November 18, 2021, a new trailer was published on the official YouTube channel and the voice actors of Papi, Rokoroko and Dorakoruru were announced. On January 17, 2022, the artist of the insert song was announced. Two more guest voice actors were announced on January 25, 2022.

== Release ==
=== Theatrical ===
The film was released in theaters on March 4, 2022, in Japan after being postponed from March 5, 2021, due to the COVID-19 pandemic. Vietnamese film distributor CGV released the film in Vietnam on May 27, 2022. It was released in China on May 28, 2022. The film was released by Odex in Malaysia on June 16, 2022. Odex opened a fan screening of the film on July 9, 2022, and SM Cinema released it in theaters in the Philippines on July 13, 2022. In Taiwan it was released on July 15, 2022. Odex also released the film in Azerbaijan and Mauritius on June 30, 2022, in Bahrain, Oman, Kuwait, Saudi Arabia, United Arab Emirates, Iraq, Qatar, Jordan and Lebanon on July 7, 2022, in Egypt on July 20, 2022, in Cyprus on July 21, 2022, and in South Africa on August 5, 2022. The film was also released in South Korea on August 3, 2022. It got a release in Turkey on August 5, 2022, with a Turkish-language dub. The film was released in Thailand on October 10, 2022.

=== Home media ===
It has been streaming on Amazon Prime Japan since August 2022. It was released on DVD and Blu-ray in Japan on December 7, 2022, with the releases also containing special bonus material.

== Reception ==
=== Box office ===
Doraemon: Nobita's Little Star Wars 2021 debuted at no. 1 in its first weekend, with a sell of about 350,000 tickets in its first three days. According to Box Office Mojo, it grossed $22,060,623 at the box office.

Here is a table which shows the box office of this movie of all the weekends in Japan:

Weekend no.	Rank	Weekend gross	Total gross till current weekend	Ref.
1	1	¥394 million (US$3.41 million)	¥440 million (US$3.81 million)	
2	1	¥281 million (US$2.37 million)	¥800 million (US$6.76 million)	
3	2	¥236 million (US$1.95 million)	¥1.3 billion (US$10.79 million)	
4	3	¥179 million (US$1.44 million)	¥1.6 billion (US$12.92 million)	
5	3	¥149 million (US$1.21 million)	¥2.1 billion (US$17.1 million)	
6	3	¥149 million (US$1.21 million)	¥2.3 billion (US$18.3 million)	
7	4	¥53,923,700 (US$422,600 (equivalent to $464,937 in 2025))	¥2,455,042,800 (US$19.2 million)	
8	8	¥34,660,050 (US$271,000 (equivalent to $298,149 in 2025))	¥2,498,689,600 (US$19.5 million)	
9	8	¥34,522,900 (US$265,600 (equivalent to $292,208 in 2025))	¥2,558,009,800 (US$19.6 million)	
10	10	¥15,258,700 (US$117,200 (equivalent to $128,941 in 2025))	¥2,627,160,350 (US$20.18 million)	

In Vietnam, the movie also debuted at no.1 in its first weekend, grossed 119.8 billion dong ($5115.94) and surpassed Top Gun: Maverick in the Vietnamese box office.

=== Critical response ===
A week before its release, the Russian invasion of Ukraine had begun. As a result, the story of the film is compared with the incident. Among them, RealSound's Kazuma Kubota points out that the pendant Papi wears in the film is the same color as the Ukrainian flag.

Writer Kaeru Inaka, in an article of 'Real Sound', praised the opening scene from Papi's escape to Nobita's movie shooting and also commented about the fast-going events of the first part of the film. Inaka also evaluated that the scene where Nobita and his friends became small, played with Papi and enjoyed the extraordinary life was a good link between the everyday scene and the upcoming war. In addition, Inaka pointed out that recent Doraemon movies tend to exaggerate emotional expressions so that even children can understand, but the animations had been done carefully so that it did not seem to be a joke. He said that the staff had been succeeded in making the film so that even children feel the terror of war.

Writer Hodaka Sugimoto wrote an article on the anime-specialized news site AnimeAnime.jp. He says that the pitifulness of dictatorship can be understood well through the contrast between Dorakoruru and Gilmore. In addition, Sugimoto pointed out that the bravery of the common people of Pirika was emphasized more than the original manga and the 1985 version and highlighted that not an external military force, but the common people living in the planet overthrow the oppressive regime.

== Other media ==
=== Book ===
A novel written by Naohiro Fukushima based on the film was released on February 4, 2022.

=== Video game ===
A Nintendo Switch game based on the film and created by FuRyu was scheduled to be released on March 4, 2021, but along with the film, its release was postponed due to the COVID-19 pandemic. The game was released on March 4, 2022.

== See also ==
- List of Doraemon films
