= Blandia =

1992 video game

- European flyer
- Developer: Allumer
- Publisher: Taito
- Platforms: Arcade, FM Towns, PC-98
- Release: JP: October 1992; EU: 1992
- Genre: Fighting
- Modes: Single-player, multiplayer

Blandia (Note: Japanese: ブランディア, Hepburn: Burandia) is a 1992 fighting video game developed by Allumer and published by Taito for arcades. It was released in Japan in October 1992 and Europe the same year. It is the sequel to Allumer's Gladiator. Along with Strata's Time Killers, Blandia is one of the earliest weapon-based fighting games modeled on the success of Capcom's Street Fighter II, a subgenre later typified by SNK's Samurai Shodown and The Last Blade.

Hamster Corporation acquired the game's rights alongside Allumer's catalogue, releasing the game as part of their Arcade Archives series for the Nintendo Switch and PlayStation 4 in October 2023.

== Plot ==
The plot of Blandia takes place five years after Gladiator, set in the "Great Continent of Eurasia". After the swordsman Gurianos defeated the evil warrior Gildus, peace returned to Eurasia and the people forgot about the darkness sealed by the evil spirit. Five years later, living in the interior of Eurasia, Guarianos learns that Gildus has been resurrected, and returns to the Golden Castle (黄金の城, "Ougon no Jō" (sometimes "Ougon no Shiro")) to investigate.

== Gameplay ==
Blandia drops the side-scrolling feature of its predecessor, but retains its versus segments with the addition of elements of other 2D versus fighting games released at the time. The player's chosen character fights against his or her opponent in two-out-of-three matches in a single player tournament mode with the computer or against another human player. Unlike most other similar fighting games at the time, Blandia combines the style of Capcom's Street Fighter II with the use of weapons in every character. Another feature is the possibility to cause visible damage to the armor of the characters, originally used in Gladiator. However, unlike Gladiator, Blandia requires players to attack the uncovered parts of the opponent's body multiple times to defeat them, instead of one hit like in Gladiator.

In one-player mode, the player must choose one of the "Original Six Warriors" to control. Instead of fighting other characters in a random order like in many contemporary fighting games, the player moves the sword-shaped cursor on a map to choose a region where one of the other characters is located, fight against them in each battle and then advance to the Golden Castle. In both one-player and two-player modes, each round lasts for five minutes, and if neither of the characters are knocked out before then, the one with the most health wins the round; however, if both lifebars are even, the players must fight in a rematch. If both lifebars are even in the rematch, the fight ends with a game over.

=== Characters ===
Guarianos and Irriana in Blandia (arcade version).

- Gurianos (ガリアノス) - the protagonist of the game. Designed for beginners, he is an average, well-balanced fighter with no weak points nor particular strengths. He is armed with a double-edged sword and a shield. His sorcery is light-based. He was originally the player's character in Gladiator, when his name was Guaranos.
- Diokles - a nihilistic fighter who is the rival of the main character Gurianos, and shares similar move sets (albeit with different names). Diokles has better agility and hitting power than Guarianos. His sorcery is fire-based.
- Irriana - a temperamental female warrior who eats when she wishes, and fights only when she wants. She is armed with a short sword and a round shield. While her sorcery is explosive-based, she mainly uses its related tricks. She is also relatively agile and has an intense jumping ability. Like Gurianos, Irriana is a returning character from Gladiator, previously spelled Irene.
- McGill - a male warrior full of confidence. He cuts by power with a longsword. His body stamina and power, compared to his longsword, are far superior. He has no sorcery.
- Jurane - a female fighter, with the longest reach but the least power, due to her weapon of choice being a short lance. Her sorcery utilizes various powerful magic tricks.
- Retsu.Zen - a man who takes a defiant attitude toward his enemies and critical situations. He is the quickest fencer, has repetitively strong offense and is armed with two-swords. His sorcery is referred to as "Zen Oriental Magic".
- Launa - a dark elf with satyr like features. She is the first boss the player faces in the Gold Castle. Fights using a dagger. She is fast but cannot block.
- Xeldus - a knight who serves as the second boss in the Gold Castle. He was apparently brainwashed by Gildus to fight for him using a sword and shield.
- Imageo - a mage who serves as the third boss in the Gold Castle. She fights the player using magic in her chambers.
- Gildus - the main antagonist of the game. He is faster and stronger than Xeldus.

== Ports ==
Blandia was later ported by Ving to two home computers exclusively in Japan: the FM Towns on September 30, 1994, and the NEC PC-9821 on June 22, 1995. Compared to the original arcade version, the FM Towns version (titled Blandia Plus) features an extended, less repetitive soundtrack, plus some exclusive tracks that include a vocal one, but it also has a smaller screen. The PC-9821 version was titled Blandia 98 and has a wider screen than the FM Towns version.
