= Tetsuya Takeda =

Japanese singer and actor (born 1949)

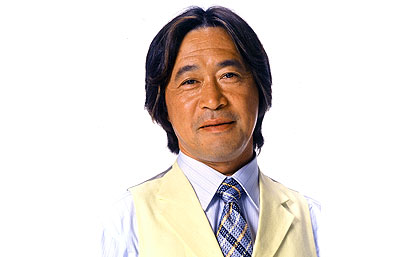

Background information
- Born: April 11, 1949 (age 77); Hakata-ku, Fukuoka, Japan
- Genres: Folk; pop
- Occupations: Singer; composer; actor
- Years active: 1972–present
- Label: Polydor Records / Universal Music Japan
- Website: Official website

Tetsuya Takeda (武田 鉄矢, Takeda Tetsuya; born April 11, 1949) is a Japanese folk singer and actor.

Takeda is perhaps most known in Japan for his starring role in the Tokyo Broadcasting System's long-running, highly rated television drama Mr. Kinpachi of the Third-Year B Class. The program, targeted at junior high and high school-aged adolescents, ran on TBS with Takeda at various times from 1979 until 2011.

Takeda wrote and performed several well-known songs, including "Childhood", the theme song for the 1985 animated film Doraemon: Nobita's Little Star Wars. Takeda's 1980 song, "The Word I Give to You", is often performed at junior high school and high school graduation ceremonies in Japan.

Previous to his appearance on Kinpachi, Takeda studied to be a teacher at Fukuoka University of Education. He later formed a folk music group called Kaientai. The song "Okuru Kotoba", which Takeda wrote and performed with Kaientai, actually had nothing to do with schooling, but is reportedly associated with education because of Takeda's role in Kinpachi.

== Filmography ==
=== Films ===
- The Yellow Handkerchief (1977), Kinya Hanada
- Stage-Struck Tora-san (1978), Tomekichi Gotō
- A Distant Cry from Spring (1980), Tamiko's cousin
- The Return of Godzilla (1984), Homeless Man
- Baby Elephant Story: The Angel Who Descended to Earth (1986), Shota Tanabe
- Bakumatsu Seishun Graffiti: Ronin Sakamoto Ryōma (1986), Sakamoto Ryōma
- Aitsu ni Koishite (1987)
- Sailor Suit and Machine Gun: Graduation (2016)
- Hanagatami (2017)
- Labyrinth of Cinema (2020), Sakamoto Ryōma
- Tang and Me (2022), Professor Masahiko Baba
- The Potentials (2026), Haruo Yoshizumi

=== Television drama ===
- Kinpachi-sensei (1979–2011), Kinpachi Sakamoto
- Kusa Moeru (1979), Adachi Morinaga
- Bakumatsu Seishun Graffiti: Ronin Sakamoto Ryōma (1982), Sakamoto Ryōma
- Tokugawa Ieyasu (1983), Toyotomi Hideyoshi
- Bakumatsu Seishun Graffiti: Fukuzawa Yukichi (1985), Sakamoto Ryōma
- Taiheiki (1991), Kusunoki Masashige
- 101st Marriage Proposal (1991)
- The Man Who Wanted to be Ultraman (1993)
- Kōmyō ga Tsuji (2006), Goto Kichibei
- Journey Under the Midnight Sun (2006), Junzō Sasagaki
- The Family (2007), Ōgame
- Jin (2009), Ogata Kōan
- Ryōmaden (2010), Katsu Kaishū
- Jun and Ai (2012–2013), Zenkō Kanō
- The Partner (2013), Inukai Tsuyoshi
- The Emperor's Cook (2015), Professor Shōgo Kirizuka
- Asa ga Kita (2015), Fukuzawa Yukichi
- Totto TV (2016), Tatsuo Ōoka
- Mito Kōmon (2017), Mito Mitsukuni

=== Other television ===
- Takeda Tetsuya no Shōwa wa kagayaiteita (2013 onwards), the host
