= Gladiator (1986 video game) =

1986 video game

- American arcade flyer
- Developer: Allumer
- Publishers: Taito (Arcade); Encore (Home computer)
- Platforms: Arcade, Amstrad CPC, Commodore 64, ZX Spectrum
- Release: 1986 (arcade); 1991 (home computer)
- Genres: Beat'em up, hack and slash
- Mode: Multiplayer

Gladiator, known in Japan as Ougon no Shiro (黄金の城, lit. "Golden Castle"), is an arcade video game developed by Allumer and published in 1986 by Taito. It was followed by a sequel titled Blandia. Home ports of Gladiator were released for the ZX Spectrum, Amstrad CPC and Commodore 64 as Great Gurianos; the Spectrum version was intentionally made unwinnable.

== Gameplay ==
Screenshot of the ZX Spectrum version, Great Gurianos

The player controls a gladiator/knight named Great Gurianos as he walks through a castle. The joystick direction moves the character left and right and raises his shield up and down. The game's three buttons correspond to a high, medium, and low attack with Great Gurianos's sword. Gladiator consists of four levels. The reward for completing the game is a fifth stage, the "Treasure Place".

Gameplay is split between two modes; in the "obstacle" mode, Great Gurianos walks forward, and the player must use the sword and shield to defend him from bats, fireballs, arrows, shuriken, and other flying hazards. The "obstacle" mode is broken up by a "fight" mode, in which Great Gurianos must fight against another, similarly armored knight. In both modes, an undefended hit to Great Gurianos knocks off part of his armor (his helmet for a high hit, his breastplate for a middle hit, and his leggings for a low hit), and a subsequent hit to the same area kills him. The character can generate a temporary force field during the obstacle course phases (when weapons and bats fly at him) by rapidly moving the shield up and down. During the combat phases, Great Gurianos can become invincible (flashing golden) for a short time.
