= Fusanosuke Natsume =

Japanese manga artist (born 1950)

Fusanosuke Natsume (夏目 房之介, Natsume Fusanosuke; born August 18, 1950) is a Japanese columnist and cartoonist.

== Early life and education ==
Born in Tokyo to Jun'ichi Natsume, grandson of novelist Natsume Sōseki, he attended Aoyama Gakuin University, where he graduated in 1973.

== Award ==
He was awarded the Tezuka Osamu Cultural Prize (Special Award) in 1999 for excellence in criticism of manga.

He has written the book Manga wa ima dō natte oru no ka? (マンガは今どうなっておるのか?) (2005), which was illustrated by Fumi Yoshinaga.
