= Flower of Life (manga) =

Japanese manga series

- Cover of the first volume of the manga as released by Digital Manga Publishing

フラワー·オブ·ライフ (Furawa obu Raifu)
- Genre: Comedy, Slice of life
- Manga
- Written by: Fumi Yoshinaga
- Published by: Shinshokan
- English publisher: NA: Digital Manga Publishing
- Magazine: Wings
- Original run: April 2004 – March 2007
- Volumes: 4

Flower of Life (Japanese: フラワー·オブ·ライフ, Hepburn: Furawa obu Raifu) is a slice of life comedy manga series by Fumi Yoshinaga revolving around a group of friends in a high school. The manga is serialised in Shinshokan's Wings. It was nominated for the first annual Manga Taishō award in 2008 and one of the Young Adult Library Services Association's 2008 Great Graphic Novels. The manga is licensed in North America by Digital Manga Publishing.

== Plot ==
Harutaro Hanazono, a cheerful and outspoken boy, enrolls at his new high school a month late, as he has been recovering from a bone marrow transplant to treat his leukemia. He is befriended by Shota Mikuni, who is also friends with Kai Majima, an otaku. Harutaro finds Kai annoying. The story follows the school life of Harutaro.

== Manga ==
Four bound volumes were released in Japan between April 2004 and March 2007 published by Shinshokan. Digital Manga Publishing released the manga's four tankōbon between January 17, 2007, and May 20, 2009.

No.	Original release date	Original ISBN	English release date	English ISBN
1	April 2004	978-4-40361-749-2	January 17, 2007	978-1-56970-939-9
2	March 25, 2005	978-4-40361-792-8	April 11, 2007	978-1-56970-873-6
3	April 2006	978-4-40361-829-1	July 11, 2007	978-1-56970-829-3
4	March 2007	978-4-40361-867-3	May 20, 2009	978-1-56970-055-6

== Reception ==
Comics Worth Reading's Johanna Draper Carlson criticises the first volume of the manga for its plot which "jumps around a good deal". A later review by Draper Carlson comments on the diversity of personalities in the second volume of the manga. She comments on Fumi Yoshinaga's treatment of the manga like an anthology from her previous work, Antique Bakery.

About.com's Deb Aoki commends the manga for its "charming mix of slice of life comedy and high school romance" but criticises it for the author's assumption that the "reader knows and understands manga culture and otaku slang". She also criticises it for having too much dialogue. Erin Finnegan at Pop Shock Culture comments on her uncertainty of the demographic of the manga. Mania.com's Patricia Beard comments on the manga's realistic "small glimpses of school life". Jason Thompson, writing for the appendix to Manga: The Complete Guide, describes Flower of Life as being Yoshinaga's "take on the high school comedy genre". While there is use of the "same basic elements" in the plot, Thompson regards the characters as being "entirely original" and as being able to "carry the story".

The fourth volume of Flower of Life was ranked 8th on the Tohan charts between May 29 and June 4, 2007. In 2008, Yoshinaga was nominated for the Eisner Award for her work on The Moon and the Sandals and Flower of Life. Flower of Life was nominated by the Young Adult Library Services Association for inclusion on its list of 2008 Great Graphic Novels for Teens. Flower of Life was nominated for the first Manga Taishō award in 2008.
