= Seiyō Uchino =

Japanese actor

- 内野 聖陽
- Born: Masaaki Uchino; September 16, 1968 (age 57); Kōhoku-ku, Yokohama, Kanagawa Prefecture, Japan
- Occupation: Actor
- Years active: 1993–present
- Agent: Stardust Promotion
- Spouse: Maki Ichiro (m. 2006; div. 2011)
- Website: Official website

Seiyō Uchino (内野 聖陽, Uchino Seiyō; born September 16, 1968, in Kōhoku-ku, Yokohama, Kanagawa Prefecture, Japan) is a Japanese actor who is represented by Stardust Promotion. Before taking his current stage name Seiyō Uchino in July 2013, he was known by his birth name Masaaki Uchino (same spelling in Japanese).

== Filmography ==
=== TV series ===
Year	Title	Role	Notes	Ref.
1993	Machikado			
1994	Jū-jihan Nemu Jiken jō			
1995	Hagurekeiji Junjō-ha	Koji Moriya	8th Series, Episode 18	
1995	The Kindaichi Case Files	Kentaro Zenigata		
1996	Tokugawa Kengō-den Sore Kara no Musashi	Hosokawa Tadanao		
1996	Tori Kaeru			
1996	Futari-kko	Shiro Moriyama	Asadora	
1996	Chūshingura	Kinemon Okano		
1997	Mrs. Cinderella	Hikaru Horii		
1997	Love Generation	Soichiro Katagiri		
1998	Tokugawa Yoshinobu	Tokugawa Yoshiatsu	Taiga drama	
1999	Hayate no yō ni	Shigeru Fujita		
2000	Kinō no Teki wa Kyō no Tomo	Takao Ogawa		
2003	The Samurai I Loved	Bunshiro Maki	Lead role	
2004	Aim for the Ace!	Jin Munakata		
2004	Toride Naki Mono	Kenji Kurashina		
2005	Fukigenna Jean	Takashi Nanbara		
2005	Hi Tachi Umanohone	Ginjiro Ishibashi	Lead role	
2007	Fūrin Kazan	Yamamoto Kansuke	Lead role; Taiga drama	
2008	Sirius no Michi	Yusuke Tatsumura	Lead role	
2008	Gonzō Densetsu no Deka	Toshihide Kuroki	Lead role	
2009	Rinjō	Yoshio Kuraishi	Lead role	
2009–11	Jin	Sakamoto Ryōma	2 seasons	
2010	Wagaya no Rekishi	Kōzō Masuda		
2010	10-nen-saki mo Kimi ni Koishite	Hiroshi Maruyama		
2011	Pandora III Kakumei Zenya	Kazumichi Yuda		
2012	Chūshingura: Sono Yoshi Sono Ai	Horibe Yasubei		
2013	Tonbi	Tasuo Ichikawa	Lead role	
2013	Onna Nobunaga	Akechi Mitsuhide		
2014	Matsumoto Seichō Special Jikan no Shūzoku	Kiichi Mihara	Lead role	
2014	Oyaji no Senaka	Masaru Shinjo	Episode 9; Lead role	
2016	Sanada Maru	Tokugawa Ieyasu	Taiga drama	
2017	Leaders 2	Wataru Yamazaki		
2018	Dokonimo nai Kuni	Kunio Maruyama	Lead role	
2018–24	Black Forceps	Seigō Saeki	2 seasons	
2019	Slow na Bushi ni Shitekure	Shigeo "Shige-chan" Murata	Lead role; TV movie	
2019–23	What Did You Eat Yesterday?	Kenji Yabuki	Lead role; 2 seasons	
2020	Bones of Steel	Sōji Ogata		
2021	Welcome Home, Monet	Kōji Nagaura	Asadora	
2025	Asura	Sadaharu		

=== Films ===
Year	Title	Role	Notes	Ref.
1996	A Last Note	Koji Kiyokawa		
1996	Haru	Noboru Hayami (Haru)		
1999	The Black House	Shinji Wakatsuki	Lead role	
2009	Elevator Trap	Saburo Yasui	Lead role	
2009	The Wonderful World of Captain Kuhio	Fujiwara		
2010	13 Assassins	Zusho Mamiya		
2012	The Last Message	Yoshio Kuraishi	Lead role	
2013	Lupin the 3rd vs. Detective Conan: The Movie	Alan Smithee (voice)		
2014	Homeland	Soichi Sawada		
2015	The Edge of Sin	Satoshi Ando	Lead role	
2015	125 Years Memory	Motosada Tamura	Lead role	
2019	First Love	Gondō		
2021	What Did You Eat Yesterday?	Kenji Yabuki	Lead role	
2021	Homunculus	Yakuza boss		
2022	Fullmetal Alchemist: The Revenge of Scar	Van Hohenheim / Father		
2022	Fullmetal Alchemist: The Final Alchemy	Van Hohenheim / Father		
2023	Picture of Spring	Ichirō Haga	Lead role	
2024	Hakkenden: Fiction and Reality	Hokusai		
2024	Angry Squad: The Civil Servant and the Seven Swindlers	Jirō Kumasawa	Lead role	
2026	Never Guilty	Shigeru Todo	Lead role	

== Awards and honours ==
Year	Honor	Ref.
2021	Medal with Purple Ribbon	

Year	Award	Category	Work(s)	Result	Ref.
1997	20th Japan Academy Film Prize	Newcomer of the Year	Haru	Won	
2011	4th Tokyo Drama Awards	Best Supporting Actor	Jin	Won	
2016	39th Japan Academy Film Prize	Best Actor	125 Years Memory	Nominated	
2024	37th Nikkan Sports Film Awards	Best Supporting Actor	Hakkenden: Fiction and Reality	Nominated	
2025	48th Japan Academy Film Prize	Best Supporting Actor	Hakkenden: Fiction and Reality	Nominated	
