= What Did You Eat Yesterday? =

Manga series by Fumi Yoshinaga

- First tankobon volume cover, featuring Shiro Kakei (left) and Kenji Yabuki (right)

きのう何食べた? (Kinō Nani Tabeta?)
- Genre: Cooking, slice of life
- Manga
- Written by: Fumi Yoshinaga
- Published by: Kodansha
- English publisher: NA: Vertical
- Magazine: Morning
- Original run: February 22, 2007 – present
- Volumes: 24
- Television drama
- Directed by: Katsumi Nojiri (S1); Kenji Katagiri (S1); Kana Matsumoto (S2); Daisuke Hirata (S2)
- Produced by: Masashi Abe
- Written by: Naoko Adachi
- Studio: Shochiku
- Original network: TV Tokyo
- Original run: April 6, 2019 – December 23, 2023
- Episodes: 24
- Live-action film
- Directed by: Kazuhito Nakae
- Written by: Naoko Adachi
- Studio: Toho
- Released: November 3, 2021
- icon

What Did You Eat Yesterday? (Japanese: きのう何食べた?, Hepburn: Kinō Nani Tabeta?) is a Japanese manga series written and illustrated by Fumi Yoshinaga. The slice of life series focuses on the relationship between Shiro Kakei and Kenji Yabuki, a middle-aged gay couple living in Tokyo, Japan. The manga has been serialized in Kodansha's seinen manga magazine Morning since February 2007, and was adapted into a live-action television drama by Shochiku that aired on TV Tokyo in 2019; a film sequel to the television drama was released in November 2021.

Both the manga and its live-action adaptation have received widespread critical acclaim, winning a Kodansha Manga Award, a Galaxy Award, and multiple Television Drama Academy Awards.

== Synopsis ==
What Did You Eat Yesterday? follows Shiro Kakei and Kenji Yabuki, a middle aged gay couple living in Tokyo, Japan. Shiro is a serious and reserved lawyer, while Kenji is cheerful and outgoing hairdresser. Each chapter in the series focuses on Shiro and Kenji as they encounter a particular comedic or dramatic scenario, often focused around issues of domestic life, workplace humor, and LGBT rights in Japan.

Many of the chapters depict a sequence in which Shiro, a gourmand, purchases food and prepares a meal for himself and Kenji. Shiro narrates the steps to create each dish through his internal monologue, and frequently prepares meals that have significance in relation to the plot or themes of the chapter. The collected tankobon editions of the series contain the recipe for the main dish prepared in each edition.

The events of the series progress in real time: Shiro and Kenji were respectively 43 and 41 years old when the series began, and as of chapter 101, are 52 and 50 years old.

== Media ==
=== Manga ===
What Did You Eat Yesterday?, written and illustrated by Fumi Yoshinaga, has been serialized in Kodansha's seinen manga magazine Morning since February 22, 2007, and has been collected into tankobon volumes published by Kodansha. In North America, an English language translation of the series has been licensed by Vertical since 2014.

=== Television drama & film ===
A live-action television drama adaptation of What Did You Eat Yesterday? was announced in Morning magazine on January 23, 2019. That same day, TV Tokyo announced that the series would star Hidetoshi Nishijima as Shiro and Seiyō Uchino as Kenji, with Naoko Adachi as screenwriter and Kazuhito Nakae, Katsumi Nojiri, and Kenji Katagiri as directors. The series aired on TV Tokyo's Drama24 programming block from April 5, 2019, to June 28, 2019, with a 90-minute special aired on January 1, 2020. Overground Acoustic Underground performed the series' opening theme song "Kaerimichi" ("The Way Back Home"), while Friends performed the closing theme "i o you".

On March 27, 2020, Toho announced that it would produce a live-action feature film sequel to the television drama, with the original cast of the television drama reprising their roles and Nakae and Adachi returning as director and scriptwriter, respectively. The film was released on November 3, 2021. A second season of the television drama was announced in May 2023, and ran from October to December 2023.

=== Other media ===
A spin-off yaoi doujinshi series, Kenji and Shiro-san (ケンジとシロさん, Kenji to Shiro-san), has been published by Fumi Yoshinaga since 2015. The series depicts scenes alluded to in the original manga, as well as sexual encounters between Kenji and Shiro. Issues of the series have been released by Yoshinaga at Comiket.

A cookbook featuring recipes prepared in the television drama, Official Guidebook & Recipes: What Did You Eat Yesterday? ～Shiro's Simple Recipes～ (公式ガイド＆レシピ きのう何食べた？ ～シロさんの簡単レシピ～), was published by Kodansha in April 2019.

An exhibition featuring sets and props from the television drama, as well as reproductions of pages from the original manga, toured Japan in 2019. The exhibition was displayed in Tokyo from June to July, Nagoya from August to September, and Osaka in September.

== Reception ==
=== Manga ===
Five million copies of the Japanese edition of What Did You Eat Yesterday? were in print as of January 2019 and 8.4 million copies as of October 2022.

The series has received positive reviews from critics, particularly for its realistic depiction of gay life in Japan, and is noted as being one of the first pieces of mainstream Japanese media to substantially portray a cohabiting gay male couple. Writing for Manga Bookshelf, Katherine Dacey praised the series for showcasing "the realities of gay life in Japan depicted in such a matter-of-fact way," while not being "preachy or dreary." Writing for ComicsVerse, Melissa Padilla cited What Did You Eat Yesterday? as a series that subverts typical LGBTQ manga and anime tropes, noting that it includes a "realistic depiction of a gay couple who are adults rather than high school or college students" and that it "tackles gay issues while still maintaining a leisurely, slice-of-life pace."

What Did You Eat Yesterday? was a nominee for the inaugural Manga Taishō Award in 2008, and a jury recommendation at the 13th Japan Media Arts Festival in 2009. In 2019, the series won the Kodansha Manga Award for Best General Manga. It has been listed for Book of the Year three times by Media Factory's Da Vinci, placing sixth in 2014, fiftieth in 2016, and second in 2020.

=== Television drama ===
What Did You Eat Yesterday? was the most-awarded series at the 101st Television Drama Academy Awards awarded by Kadokawa, winning Best TV Series; Best Actor in a Leading Role for Seiyō Uchino (with Hidetoshi Nishijima placing second); Best Screenplay for Naoko Adachi; and Best Director for Kazuhito Nakae, Katsumi Nojiri, and Kenshi Katagiri. The 16th Confidence Award Drama Prize given by Oricon was awarded to What Did You Eat Yesterday? for Best TV Series and Best Actor in a Leading Role, the later of which was won by both Nishijima and Uchino. The series was additionally awarded the July 2019 Galaxy Award, given by the Japan Council for Better Radio and Television.

== Analysis ==
=== Portrayal of gay domestic life ===
Writing for Culture, Society and Masculinities, Katsuhiko Suganuma notes that the relationship between Shiro and Kenji is depicted as largely non-sexual, contrasting stereotypical media portrayals of gay men as hypersexual or sexually deviant. Far from reinforcing equally permissive stereotypes of gay men as emasculated, Suganuma argues that by not depicting Shiro and Kenji's sex life, the series "intentionally ignores the expectations of the curiosity-ridden heteronormative public" to focus on the domestic lives of gay men. Consequently, he cautions against interpreting What Did You Eat Yesterday? as being merely assimilationist or homonormative, arguing that it "provides readers with occasional instances of modification of gender and sexuality norms in contemporary Japanese society."

=== Portrayal of masculinity ===
Xuan Bach Tran has noted that while cooking media featuring men in Japan typically foregrounds competition and pursuits of excellence, as in series such as Iron Chef and Oishinbo, What Did You Eat Yesterday? depicts cooking as merely a hobby and a necessity for life. While Shiro embodies many of the traits of the "herbivore man"—he is unambitious in his career, and largely socially withdrawn—he falls out of this category through his love of cooking, and derives his masculinity from "self-care and expressions of selfhood". Suganuma concurs in Culture, Society and Masculinities that as Shiro's utilitarian cooking style is neither archetypically masculine nor archetypically feminine, it "[distances] itself from a polarized gender binary."
