= Motoka Murakami =

Japanese manga artist (born 1951)

Motoka Murakami (Japanese: 村上 もとか, Hepburn: Murakami Motoka; born June 3, 1951, in Setagaya, Tokyo) is a Japanese manga artist. He won the Kodansha Manga Award for shōnen manga for Gakuto Retsuden 1982 and the Shogakukan Manga Award twice, for shōnen manga for Musashi no Ken in 1984 and for general manga in 1996 for Ron, serialized in Big Comic Original from 1991 to 2006. In 1998, he received an Excellence Prize at the Japan Media Arts Festival for Ron. Jin won the Grand Prize at the 2011 Tezuka Osamu Cultural Prize. On a list published in the beginning of August 2011, he ranked as the 35th best-selling manga artist since January 2010, with 1,901,000 copies sold.

== Works ==
- Akai Pegasus
- Musashi no Ken
- Jin
