= Fumi Yoshinaga =

Japanese manga artist (born 1971)

Fumi Yoshinaga よしなが ふみ
- Born: 1971 (age 54–55) Tokyo, Japan
- Areas: Character designer, writer, manga artist
- Awards: Tezuka Osamu Cultural Prize, Kodansha Manga Award, Shogakukan Manga Award, Japan Media Arts Festival (Excellence Prize), Sense of Gender Award, James Tiptree, Jr. Award

Fumi Yoshinaga (Japanese: よしなが ふみ, Hepburn: Yoshinaga Fumi; born 1971) is a Japanese manga artist known for her shōjo and boys' love works.

== Life ==
Fumi Yoshinaga was born in Tokyo, Japan in 1971. She discovered amateur manga, doujinshi, in junior high school, when a friend showed her a doujinshi depicting a romantic relationship between two male characters of Captain Tsubasa. While still in school, she hid from others that she was an otaku in order to avoid bullying.

She attended Keio University in Tokyo. While at university, she joined a manga club in order to be able to talk to others about manga. When she read the popular manga series Slam Dunk, she was inspired to create a gay love story based on the characters of Kogure and Mitsui. She continued making doujinshi throughout her time as a student and participated in doujinshi conventions.

Her professional career started as an addition to her activities as a doujinshi artist. She made her professional debut as a manga artist in 1994 with The Moon and the Sandals, serialized in the newly-founded boys' love magazine Hanaoto. The editor of the magazine was a friend of hers that she had met through doujinshi.

She continued working for boys' love magazines, but eventually switched to mainstream magazines, as boys' love magazines had policies that artists had to include sex scenes, which she found difficult.

== Style and themes ==
=== Themes ===
Most of her romantic works center male-male romance. At a young age, she read shōjo manga depicting homosexuality, such as Patalliro!, Kaze to Ki no Uta, and Hi Izuru Tokoro no Tenshi. Yoshinaga explains that she is not passionate about normative romantic storylines: "However, I can easily broaden my imagination as to stories starting from 'comradeships,' 'master-slave' relationships or the kind of friendship that becomes too passionate and then turns into romance". When she creates gay storylines, she keeps in mind that gay people might read them. With her series What Did You Eat Yesterday?, she wanted to depict the daily life of a middle-aged gay couple without focusing on romance, instead putting the difficulties of living together as a couple and cooking at the center of the plot.

Yoshinaga's work often challenges traditional gender roles. She creates female characters who behave with emotional clarity and rationality, and male characters who are openly emotional or irrational, reversing stereotypical portrayals. Her manga convey a "gallant" or graceful tone (isagiyoi), balancing emotional restraint with sharp insight into human behavior. In Ōoku: The Inner Chambers, Yoshinaga imagines a matriarchal Edo-period Japan, using the gender-reversed premise to critique societal norms and highlight feminist themes.

In an interview, she said that "I want to show the people who didn't win, whose dreams didn't come true. It is not possible for everybody to get first prize. I want my readers to understand the happiness that people can get from trying hard, going through the process, and getting frustrated".

Outside of her work with Japanese publishers, she also self-publishes original doujinshi on a regular basis, most notably for Antique Bakery. Yoshinaga has also drawn parodies of Slam Dunk, Rose of Versailles, and Legend of Galactic Heroes.

=== Visual style ===
Yoshinaga's manga are characterized by a unique use of pacing and panel composition, drawing on formal techniques traditionally associated with shōjo manga. Natsume Fusanosuke identifies her use of ma (temporal beats or pauses) and mahaku (white or blank space) as central to her narrative style. These techniques help her create emotional resonance, whether in moments of dry humor or intense pathos. Yoshinaga often depicts scenes using minimal background detail, focusing instead on facial expressions and timing. This approach allows jokes to "land" with a delay and emotional scenes to linger subtly across multiple panels. According to Natsume, this minimalist and expressive technique reflects both Yoshinaga's artistic shyness and her formal innovation.

== Reception ==
Manga critic Natsume Fusanosuke views Yoshinaga's approach as a sophisticated extension of shōjo manga expression, while other scholars such as Hikari Hori have emphasized her feminist and deconstructive storytelling.

Of Yoshinaga's many works, several have been licensed internationally. She was also selected and exhibited as one of the "Twenty Major Manga artist Who Contributed to the World of Shōjo Manga (World War II to Present)" for Professor Masami Toku's exhibition, "Shōjo Manga: Girl Power!" at CSU-Chico.

She has received several awards for her works:

Year	Nominated work	Category	Result	Notes
2002	Antique Bakery	Kodansha Manga Award (Shōjo)	Won	
2004	All My Darling Daughters	Japan Media Arts Festival	Longlisted	selected as a Jury Recommended Work (Manga Division)
2005	Ōoku: The Inner Chambers	Sense of Gender Awards (Special Prize)	Won	
2006	Ōoku: The Inner Chambers	Japan Media Arts Festival (Excellence Award)	Won	
2007	Ōoku: The Inner Chambers	Tezuka Osamu Cultural Prize	Nominated	
2007	Antique Bakery	Eisner Award (Best U.S. Edition of International Material – Japan)	Nominated	English-language translation by Digital Manga Publishing
2008	Flower of Life	YALSA Great Graphic Novels for Teens	Won	English-language translation by Digital Manga Publishing
2008	The Moon and the Sandals	YALSA Great Graphic Novels for Teens	Nominated	English-language translation by Digital Manga Publishing
2008	Ōoku: The Inner Chambers	Manga Taishō	Nominated	
2008	Flower of Life	Manga Taishō	Nominated	
2008	What Did You Eat Yesterday?	Manga Taishō	Nominated	
2008	Ōoku: The Inner Chambers	Tezuka Osamu Cultural Prize	Nominated	
2008	—	Eisner Award (Best Writer/Artist).	Nominated	
2009	Ōoku: The Inner Chambers	Tezuka Osamu Cultural Prize (Grand Prize)	Won	
2009	Ōoku: The Inner Chambers	James Tiptree, Jr. Award	Won	English-language translation by Viz Media
2010	Ōoku: The Inner Chambers	YALSA Great Graphic Novels for Teens	Won	English-language translation by Viz Media
2010	Ōoku: The Inner Chambers	Shogakukan Manga Award (Shōjo)	Won	
2019	What Did You Eat Yesterday?	Kodansha Manga Award (General)	Won	
2021	Ōoku: The Inner Chambers	SOG Hall of Fame Award (Hakusensha)	Won	all 19 volumes

== Works ==
=== One-shots ===
- Truly Kindly (本当に、やさしい。, Hontō ni, Yasashii)
- Solfege (ソルフェージュ)
- Kodomo no Taion (こどもの体温; lit. 'A Child's Temperature')
- Lovers in the Night (愛とは夜に気付くもの, Ai Towa Yoru ni Kitzuku Mono)
- Garden Dreams (彼は花園で夢を見る, Kare wa Hanazono de Yume o Miru; lit. 'He Dreams in the Flower Garden')
- All My Darling Daughters (愛すべき娘たち, Ai Subeki Musumetachi)
- Don't Say Anymore, Darling (それを言ったらおしまいよ, Sore o Ittara Oshimai yo; lit. 'If You Say That, It's Over')
- Not Love but Delicious Foods (愛がなくても喰ってゆけます。, Ai ga Nakutemo Kutte Yukemasu)
- Shitsuji no Bunzai (執事の分際; lit. 'A Butler's Place')

=== Series ===
- The Moon and the Sandals (月とサンダル, Tsuki to Sandaru)
- Ichigenme... The First Class is Civil Law (1限めはやる気の民法, Ichigenme wa Yaruki no Minpō)
- Gerard & Jacques (ジェラールとジャック, Jerāru to Jakku)
- Antique Bakery (西洋骨董洋菓子店, Seiyō Kotto Yōgashiten)
- Flower of Life (フラワー・オブ・ライフ, Furawā obu Raifu)
- Ōoku: The Inner Chambers (大奥; lit. 'The Shogun's Harem')
- What Did You Eat Yesterday? (きのう何食べた?)
- Tamaki & Amane (環と周)

=== Illustrations ===
==== Shōnen-ai novels ====
- Garasu Zaiku no Tenshi (硝子細工の天使)
- Kono Ame ga Yuki ni Kawaru Made (この雨が雪にかわるまで)
- Baby Love (ベイビィラヴ)
- Position (ポジション)
- Innocent Sky (イノセント・スカイ)
- Saginuma Yakkyoku de... (サギヌマ薬局で...)
- Second Messenger (セカンドメッセンジャー)
- Hanayakana Meikyū (華やかな迷宮)
- Itsutsu no Oto (五つの音)
- Kamakura saryou koimonogatari (鎌倉茶寮恋物語)
- Usotsuki no Koi (嘘ツキの恋)
- Muzai Sekai (無罪世界)

==== Miscellaneous ====
- Manga wa Ima Dounatte Oru no ka (マンガは今どうなっておるのか) – A book about the state of manga today by famed manga scholar, Fusanosuke Natsume
- Kore ga Watashitachi no DVD Best Selection 70 (これがワタシたちのDVDベストセレクション70) – Mag Garden
- Motto! Kore ga Watashitachi no DVD Best Selection 70 (もっと!これがワタシたちのDVDベストセレクション70) – Mag-Garden
- Unmeironsha Jyakku to Sono Aruji (運命論者ジャックとその主人) – New Japanese edition of Denis Diderot's Jacques the Fatalist and his Master
- Ano hito to Koko Dake no Oshaberi (あのひととここだけのおしゃべり) – Interviews of selected manga artist
