= Sharp Point Press =

Taiwanese publishing company

- Type: Private
- Industry: publication
- Genre: manga, music, military
- Founded: July 1982; 44 years ago
- Founder: Sing Wang
- Headquarters: Zhongshan District, Taipei, Taiwan
- Key people: Sing Wang (Chairman)
- Revenue: 元102 million
- Parent: Cite Publishing Ltd
- Website: http://www.spp.com.tw/

Sharp Point Press (Chinese: 尖端出版) is a Taiwanese publisher of manga and music. It was founded in July 1982.

== History ==
- 1982 - Company established. Mainly publishes military and models related books.
- 1985 - Started publishing annual Zodiac fortune telling handbook.
- 1987 - Created Taiwan's first magazine on TV Games in July, started another TV Game magazine, TV Game Report in October.
- 1990 - Started the Anime, manga, model information magazine, Magic Zone. Also officially started manga publication.
- End of 1990 - Company is listed on the sharemarkets.
- 1991 - Obtained Japanese manga license for Rumiko Takahashi's Urusei Yatsura
- 1992 - Published idol photo albums of Hong Kong singers/movie stars like Leon Lai, Aaron Kwok.
- 1993 - Started other TV games magazine like VV Kids, Game Paradise, and Seinen manga magazine Tempo.
- 1994 - Started publishing a fashion living fortune telling magazine My Birthday.
- 1996 - Imported the trading card game Magic: The Gathering.
- 2001 - TOM Group brought Sharp Point Press
- July 25, 2003 - Due to Da Ran Culture Ltd.'s bankruptcy, Sharp Point Press obtained publishing rights to Ribon's Mon Mon, which became Taiwan's best selling magazine.
- August 12, 2007 - Sharp Point Press obtained license for Shogakukan's Ciao.

== See also ==
- Category:Sharp Point Press titles
