= Shūkan Gendai =

Japanese weekly news magazine

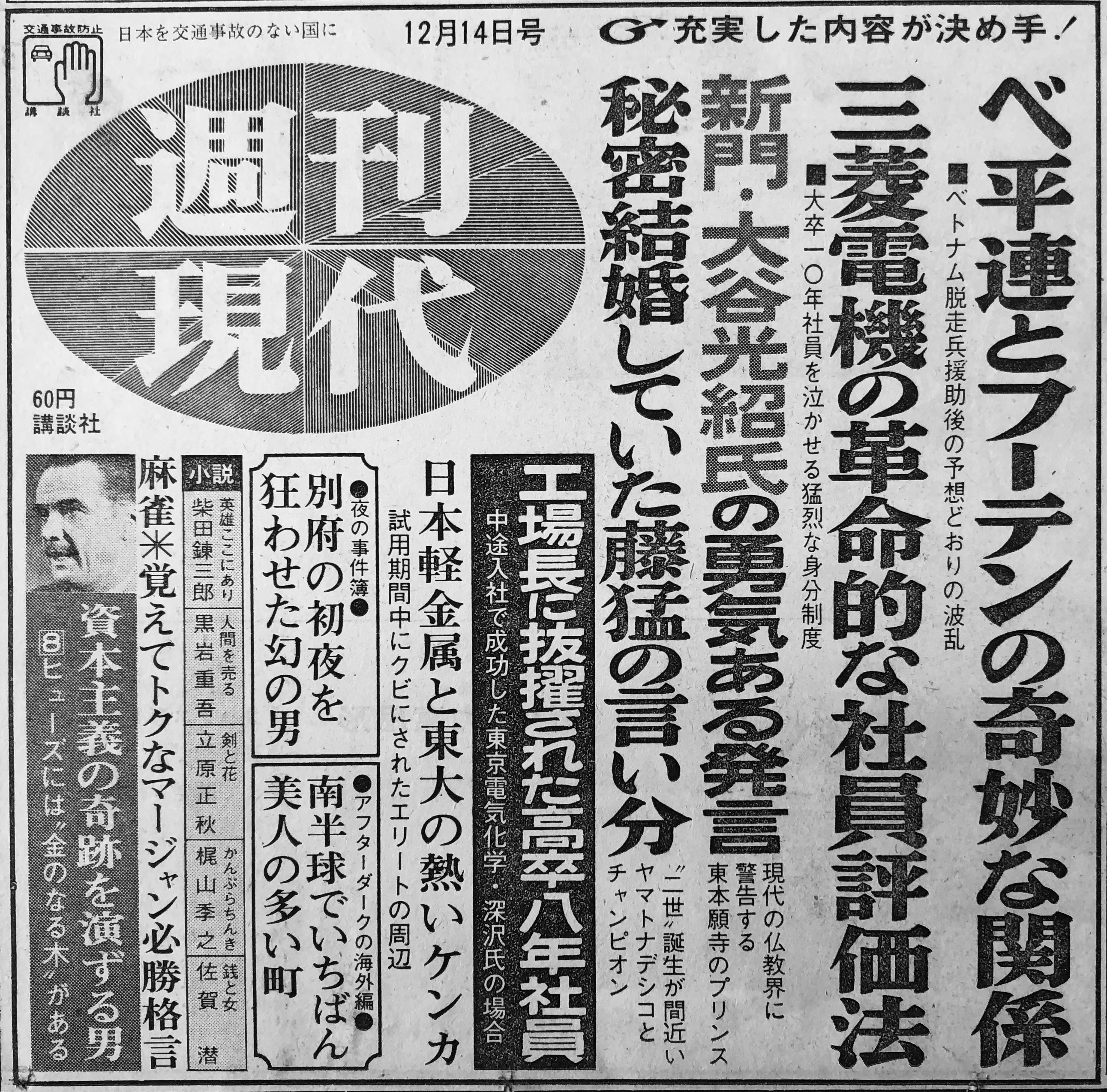
- Categories: General-interest magazine
- Frequency: Weekly
- Founded: 1959
- Company: Kodansha
- Country: Japan
- Based in: Tokyo
- Language: Japanese

Shūkan Gendai (週刊現代, Modern Weekly) is a general-interest weekly magazine published by Kodansha in Tokyo, Japan.

== History and profile ==
Shūkan Gendai was founded in 1959. The magazine has its headquarters in Tokyo. It is published by Kodansha, the largest publishing house in Japan, and covers entertainment news, as well as hard news such as interviews with Prime Minister of Japan and other VIPs in the political and financial world. It also contains essays and opinions by well-known authors in serial form. In its photo section, it runs news photos in both black and white and in color.

The magazine competes primarily with three other weekly magazines: Shūkan Bunshun, Shūkan Shincho and Shūkan Post.

Although the magazine is primarily aimed at businessmen in their 40s to 60s, its female readership has been increasing recently, with 30% of the audience now female, compared to just 10% in the past.

Shūkan Gendai is well known for its anti–nuclear power stance, including its opposition to the restarting of nuclear power stations.

In November 2012, the magazine was verbally warned by the Japanese authorities for publishing obscene photos of female genitalia.

In 2001, Shūkan Gendai had a circulation of 720,000 copies. It was 383,860 copies in 2010 and 407,949 copies in 2011.

== List of manga ==
- Onward Towards Our Noble Deaths, by Shigeru Mizuki
- Path of the Assassin, by Kazuo Koike and Goseki Kojima
- Samurai Executioner, by Kazuo Koike and Goseki Kojima
- Tokumei Kakarichō Tadano Hitoshi, by Kimio Yanagisawa
