= Oretachi ni Asu wa Naissu =

Japanese manga

俺たちに明日はないッス
- Manga
- Written by: Akira Sasō
- Published by: Shogakukan
- Magazine: Big Comic Spirits
- Original run: 1994 – 1996
- Volumes: 2
- Live-action film

Ain't No Tomorrows
- Directed by: Yuki Tanada
- Released: November 22, 2008

Oretachi ni Asu wa Naissu (俺たちに明日はないッス) is a Japanese manga written and illustrated by Akira Sasō. It was adapted into a live action high school coming-of-age comedy drama film titled Ain't No Tomorrows, directed by Yuki Tanada and released on November 22, 2008.

== Cast ==
- Tokio Emoto as Mikio
- Yuya Endo as Akihiro
- Ini Kusano as Anpai
- Miwako as Natsuko
- Tomorowo Taguchi
- Sakura Ando as Chizu
- Ayame Misaki as Akie

== Reception ==
On Midnight Eye, Tom Mes said "the overall impression is one of a freshness and vitality so rarely found in youth-oriented drama."
