= Path of the Assassin =

Japanese manga series

- Cover of the first volume

半蔵の門 (Hanzō no Mon)
- Manga
- Written by: Kazuo Koike
- Illustrated by: Goseki Kojima
- Published by: Kodansha
- English publisher: NA: Dark Horse Comics
- Magazine: Weekly Gendai
- Original run: 1978 – 1984
- Volumes: 20

Path of the Assassin (Japanese: 半蔵の門, Hepburn: Hanzō no Mon; lit. 'Hanzō's Teachings') is a Japanese manga series written by Kazuo Koike and illustrated by Goseki Kojima; it was published in Kodansha's Weekly Gendai magazine. Unlike their previous collaborations on Lone Wolf and Cub and Samurai Executioner, this story focuses on two historical figures from 16th-century Japan.

Path of the Assassin is the story of Hattori Hanzō, the master ninja whose duty it was to protect Tokugawa Ieyasu, who would grow up to become shōgun and unify Japan. The creators poetically describe the story as "Lifelong Friends, with the Same Dreams, Striving to Grow into a Rising River". The 20-volume series has been reprinted by Dark Horse Comics in a thicker 15 volume edition, translated into English and oriented in the original right-to-left reading format.

== Plot ==
Path of the Assassin is the story of Hattori Hanzō, the fabled master ninja whose duty was to protect Tokugawa Ieyasu, the shōgun who would unite Japan into one great nation. But before he could do that, he had to grow up and learn how to love the ladies. As the secret caretaker of such an influential future leader, not only does Hanzo use vast and varied ninja talents, but in living closely with Ieyasu, he forms a close friendship with the young shōgun. The quality of their relationship is unforgettably crystallized by Hanzo's fulfillment of a challenging but enticing task Ieyasu sets him: to demonstrate how to make love to a woman, which neither youngster has ever done. Hanzo succeeds at obliging his master and winning himself a woman whom he pleases, but anticipating that he won't be able to serve both master and wife, Hattori turns away the young woman he won while Ieyasu walks a tactical tightrope between the factions contending for rule—one led by his de facto father, the other by his older brother while Hanzo meets Tsukumo, the female ninja who will be his wife. Ieyasu wins his first battle when his foster father is killed, which simplifies Ieyasu's next choice of an ally, while meanwhile Hanzo and Tsukumo oppose the marriage because two families' lords are potential rivals. Later, Hanzo rescues Ieyasu's wife and children from a sadistic warlord, precipitating an attempt on Hanzo's life and, oddly, estrangement between him and Ieyasu when Hanzo offends Ieyasu's wife. Hanzo's father-in-law is attacked by another ninja who had previously attacked Hanzo, and the dying man charges Hanzo and Tsukumo to avenge him. Ieyasu, awaiting Hanzo's return from his voluntary exile, makes a mistake by attempting to collect rice from Buddhist-monk vassals belonging to a sect that spurns feudal obligations and provokes an uprising that may be taken advantage of by his rivals. Hanzo learns of the situation and with Tsukumo begins a series of subterfuges and impersonations which culminates in him obtaining a secret document that enables Ieyasu to quell the uprising.

== Publication history ==
Dark Horse manga volumes:

- Volume 1. Serving in the Dark (July 2006).
- Volume 2. Sand and Flower (August 2006).
- Volume 3. Comparison of a Man (November 2006).
- Volume 4. The Man Who Altered the River's Flow (December 2006).
- Volume 5. Battle of One Hundred and Eight Days (February 2007).
- Volume 6. Life's Greatest Difficulty (April 2007).
- Volume 7. Center of the World (June 2007).
- Volume 8. Shinobi with Extending Fists (August 2007).
- Volume 9. Battle for Power - Part 1 (October 2007).
- Volume 10. Battle for Power - Part 2 (March 2008).
- Volume 11. Hikuma Castle (April 2008).
- Volume 12. Three Foot Battle (May 2008).
- Volume 13. Hateful Burden (September 2008)
- Volume 14. Bad Blood (January 2009)
- Volume 15. One Who Rules the Dark (May 2009)
