= Kodomo no Kodomo =

Manga series by Akira Sasō

- First volume of Kodomo no Kodomo.

コドモのコドモ
- Manga
- Written by: Akira Sasō
- Published by: Futabasha
- Magazine: Manga Action
- Published: May 20, 2004
- Volumes: 3
- Live-action film
- Directed by: Koji Hagiuda
- Produced by: Picnic
- Music by: Shugo Tokumaru
- Studio: Bitters End
- Released: 27 September 2008
- Runtime: 122 minutes

Kodomo no Kodomo (コドモのコドモ; translation: "A Child's Child") is a manga series by Akira Sasō, published in Manga Action in 2004 before being compiled in three volumes in 2005. It follows an 11-year-old girl named Haruna who becomes pregnant and gives birth with the support of her classmates. A live action adaptation, directed by Koji Hagiuda and starring Haruna Amari, was released in 2008.

== Plot ==
Haruna and her childhood friend Hiroyuki are fifth-grade students who attend an unnamed school in Japan. Their class, taught by the young teacher Ms. Yagi, is a rambunctious one, despite efforts from Yagi and the class representative Mika. One day, when they are playing in the park, Haruna asks Hiroyuki if he wants to "stick it in". They find the experience funny, and Haruna jokes about the "white urine" which came out of Hiroyuki's penis. As they go to their respective homes, Haruna does not suspect that she has become pregnant.

Over the next few months Haruna grows bigger, which her family attributes to her increased appetite, and begins suffering morning sickness. Haruna realizes her pregnancy after Yagi teaches an explicit sex ed class, with dolls illustrating intercourse. She hides this new understanding from her family, trying to keep the pregnancy a secret. After fearing that she's lost her mother and realizing how important a parent can be, Haruna decides to keep the baby, rather than having an abortion.

Haruna's secret slowly gets out. She tells Hiroyuki, as the father, and Daigo, whom she has a crush on. She also accidentally tells Mika, thinking that she is another classmate named Mayu; Mika begins to worry about her pregnant classmate. The entire class learns of Haruna's pregnancy before an athletics competition, when Haruna rebuffs claims that she's fat by yelling "I'm running for two!" As the due date comes closer Haruna's grandmother learns of the pregnancy and gives Haruna cloth diapers and a talisman to ease the birth, but dies before she can tell Haruna's mother.

Meanwhile, Yagi is losing control over her class as she is stalked by her ex-boyfriend, Nomura, with whom she broke up after he was too insistent on sex. The PTA, unaware of the stalking problem and its effect on her home life, find Yagi disorganized and unprepared for classes. They are also outraged over her teaching methods – particularly in sex ed. Towards the end of Haruna's pregnancy, the fifth graders mutiny against Yagi, refusing to listen to her orders or follow her rules.

Ultimately, the child is born a month before expected. Unable to reach Haruna's family or a doctor, the children decide to help Haruna give birth in their hideout, a shack in the middle of a field. Their classmate Mitsuo – whose father is an obstetrician – guides them through the process, and after the birth the children take turns watching the baby – named Hajime, meaning "beginning" – although Haruna is the only one who can feed him. The students try to raise Hajime in secrecy, but after Haruna and the children save Ms. Yagi from her stalker the teacher learns of Hajime's existence. Rather than report the news to Haruna's parents, and thus run the risk of national ridicule for not knowing her own student was pregnant, Yagi decides to teach the children how to take care of babies.

The secret is found out when Haruna's grandfather goes unexpectedly for a walk, taking the baby with him from the hideout. The adults who find him demand to know whose baby he is carrying, and Haruna confesses. Hiroyuki's parents refuse to acknowledge their son as the father, and the press and neighbours' talk drives them to move to Hiroshima; at the last minute Hiroyuki gets off the train to affirm he is the father. Twelve years later, Haruna has raised Hajime alone and become a model. The classmates and their teacher gather at the old hideout, and Hajime meets his father for the first time. A pregnant Ms. Yagi suddenly goes into labour, giving birth to a daughter whom she names Haruna.

== Characters ==
- Haruna Mochida (持田 春菜, Mochida Haruna), a girl who grows up in a household where sexual matters are discussed rarely, if at all. She has a tomboyish nature and unruly hair.
- Hiroyuki (ヒロユキ), a young boy who has been friends with Haruna since childhood. He is mainly interested in insects.
- Hajime (元), the son of Haruna and Hiroyuki
- Maruyama Tama (まるやま たま, Maruyama Tama), a close friend of Haruna's
- Mayu Asakura (朝倉 真由, Asakura Mayu), a close friend of Haruna's
- Mika Yoshida (吉田 美香, Yoshida Mika), a quiet, bespectacled young girl who is respected by adults. She is class representative.
- Kiyoko Yagi (八木 希代子, Yagi Kiyoko), a young, teacher who has progressive ideas. She has a hard time controlling her class and has a stalker. Other teachers look down on her because of the troubles with her class.
- Saeko Ayako (冴子綾子, Ayako Saeko), Haruna's mother
- Yoshiro (ヨシロウ), Haruna's father
- Akimi (秋美), Haruna's sister, older by six years; Her best friend Tomoko has an abortion at the Namatame clinic.
- Haruna's grandfather, a farmer.
- Haruna's grandmother, the first in the family to notice the pregnancy, but suddenly collapses three days before the birth and dies.
- Pigman (ブタマン, Butaman), a large portly friend of Haruna's. His real name is Mansaku (万作).
- Mitsuo Namatame (生田目 ミツオ, Namatame Mitsuo), Pigman's sidekick; his parents run an obstetrics and gynaecology clinic from their home.
- Daigo (ダイゴ), a boy whom Haruna has a crush on

== Publication and reception ==
Kodomo no Kodomo was penned by Akira Sasō and published in Manga Action over twenty issues in 2004. Three volumes were compiled and published by Futabasha in 2005, on 28 January, 28 April, and 27 August respectively. In 2008, Futabasha compiled the whole story in a single volume. While writing the story, Sasō attempted to balance the point of view of the children with that of adults and emphasize the conflict of old and new. He set the story in a suburb of Tokyo.

Minami Nobunaga, reviewing Kodomo no Kodomo for the Asahi Shimbun, wrote that the manga, despite its seemingly simple premise, touched on themes of education, parent–child relationships, community, professionalism, and gender equality. The reviewer described the manga as reaching all of the reader's senses, including through the heat of a dead chicken and the sound of Hajime's heart beating in sync with Haruna's.

== Film adaptation ==
A live-action adaptation of the manga was directed by Kōji Hagiuda, who had previously adapted Sasō's Shindō. The film was shot in Noshiro, Akita, although the city council took issue with the film's themes. It starred Haruna Amari – a new actress chosen from 400 children at an audition – as Haruna. It also featured Kumiko Asō, Juri Ueno, Mitsuki Tanimura, Yoshiko Miyazaki, and Ken Mitsuishi. The subject matter was not unprecedented in Japanese cinema; a TV drama called 14-sai no Haha (14-Year-Old Mother) had been released in 2006; several writers also noted that the film followed the success of the similarly themed American film Juno (2007). The film's soundtrack was handled by Shugo Tokumaru, in his debut as a film composer. Prior to its release there were calls for it to be banned for its themes of teenage pregnancy, though screening went ahead as scheduled and the film debuted on 27 September 2008.

In his review for The Japan Times, Mark Schilling describes the film as an exposure of "the idiocies and hypocrisies of parents and teachers in dealing with the burgeoning sexuality of tweens, while tenderly celebrating the process of pregnancy and birth", adopting a positive view of early pregnancy while still showing the consequences and scandals a young mother faces. He also points out that the movie's realist tone is deceptive, calling it "a serious film about a serious subject that is more wish fulfillment than realism". In his review of the film, Yūichi Maeda gives it 55 out of a 100. He finds it to have abandoned some of the manga's darker elements, such as a class run amok under a powerless feminist teacher. He also notes that the film version changed the athletics meet to a school play, and removed the glasses Mika wore in the manga; he considered these detrimental to the film, which he finds unable to adequately deal with its subject material.

== Works cited ==
- "トクマルシューゴ: バイオグラフィー / BARKS アーティスト" [Biography, Shugo Tokumaru]. Barks. 27 April 2004. Archived from the original on 29 October 2013.
- "上映中止の声も。小学生の妊娠描く「コドモのコドモ」に教育関係者の反応は？" [Against Calls for the Film to be Cancelled, A Child's Child Screened to Find Educators' Reactions]. Eiga.com. 16 September 2014. Archived from the original on 15 June 2013.
- コドモのコドモ [A Child's Child]. Kinema Junpo (in Japanese). Archived from the original on 25 July 2014.
- コドモのコドモ 1 [A Child's Child Vol. 1] (in Japanese). Futabasha.
- コドモのコドモ 2 [A Child's Child Vol. 2] (in Japanese). Futabasha. Archived from the original on 5 March 2016.
- コドモのコドモ 3 完 [A Child's Child Vol. 3] (in Japanese). Futabasha. Archived from the original on 5 March 2016.
- 小說コドモのコドモ [Compilation: A Child's Child]. WorldCat. OCLC 252588357.
- "Kodomo no Kodomo Manga's Live-Action Film in September". Anime News Network. 19 June 2008. Archived from the original on 10 September 2014.
- "Kodomo no Kodomo's Live-Action Film Trailer Streamed". Anime News Network. 28 August 2008. Archived from the original on 6 December 2014.
- Maeda, Yūichi (27 September 2008). 『コドモのコドモ』55点（100点満点中） [A Child's Child 55/100]. 超映画批評 (in Japanese).
- Nobunaga, Minami (11 September 2005). "（南信長さんのコミック教養講座） コドモのコドモ [著]さそうあきら" [A Child's Child, by Akira Sasō]. Asahi Shimbun. Archived from the original on 4 March 2016.
- Sasō, Akira (2005). コドモのコドモ [A Child's Child]. Action Comics (in Japanese). Vol. 2. Tokyo: Futabasha. ISBN 978-4-575-83084-2.
- Sasō, Akira. "原作者のことば" [From the Author]. Official Website of Kodomo no Kodomo (in Japanese). Archived from the original on 26 August 2016.
- Schilling, Mark (19 September 2008). "'Kodomo no Kodomo'". The Japan Times. Archived from the original on 7 October 2016.
