= Maestro! (2015 film) =

2015 Japanese film

- Film poster
- Directed by: Shotaro Kobayashi
- Screenplay by: Satoko Okudera
- Based on: Maestro by Akira Sasō
- Produced by: Miyuki Tanaka; Yoko Ide; Kasumi Yao
- Starring: Toshiyuki Nishida; Tori Matsuzaka; Miwa; Yutaka Matsushige; Kyusaku Shimada
- Cinematography: Motonobu Kiyoku
- Edited by: Ryūji Miyajima
- Music by: Kōji Ueno
- Production companies: Asmik Ace; Wowow; T.Y. Limited; Dentsu; Parco; C&I Entertainment; Tōkai Television Broadcasting; Iwamoto Metal Co.; Futabasha; The Yomiuri Shimbun Holdings
- Distributed by: Shochiku
- Release date: January 31, 2015 (Japan)
- Running time: 129 minutes
- Country: Japan
- Language: Japanese

Maestro! (Japanese: マエストロ！, Hepburn: Maesutoro!) is a Japanese drama film released in 2015, directed by Shotaro Kobayashi and based on the manga of the same name by Akira Sasō. Maestro! stars Toshiyuki Nishida as Tendō and Tori Matsuzaka as Kōsaka, in addition to Miwa, Yutaka Matsushige and Kyusaku Shimada. The film featured as part of the 2015 LA EigaFest.

== Plot ==
An orchestra is reformed, after initially having been disbanded because of money. The group is reformed by a mysterious benefactor, whose management style annoys many of the players. The story centres around the young violinist, Kosaka, who is offered a position in the re-formed prestigious orchestra. However, he is surprised to discover that the rehearsal place is a disused factory and performances of the members is somewhat erratic, as the majority of the best players have found positions elsewhere. Amid the chaos, conductor Tendo Tetsusaburo arrives. The movie explores the relationships between the individual players, friction heightened between them based on their work ethics and egos. Some of the professional egos creates drama, particularly when an amateur (though gifted)flute player, Amane Tachibana (played by singer/songwriter Miwa) arrives. With the orchestra facing continuing financial problems, the erratic conductor continues to push the orchestra, and despite his abnormal ways, starts to get results.

== Cast ==
- Toshiyuki Nishida as Tendō
- Tori Matsuzaka as Kōsaka
- Miwa as Amane Tachibana
- Yutaka Matsushige as Hiroaki Soma
- Kyusaku Shimada as Shuzo Shimaoka
- Satoru Saito as Kaoru Icchouda
- Goro Oishi as Isao Murakami
- Tomoya Nakamura as Hiroshi Tange
- Seminosuke Murasugi as Naoto Kabe
- Moro Morooka as Minoru Suzuki
- Katsuya Kobayashi as Shukei Itami
- Aoba Kawai as Ryoko Sakaki
- Mari Hamada as Yukie Tani
- Tetsuhiro Ikeda as Toru Imaizumi
- Kanji Furutachi as Kentaro Akutsu
- Junko Miyashita
- Yasushi Fuchikami
- Hanta Kinoshita
- Yuri Nakamura
- Toshiki Ayata
- Masanori Ishii
- Denden
- Nobuyuki Tsujii
- Yutaka Sado
- Toshiki Ayata
- Yasushi Fuchikami
