= Omoi (manga publisher) =

Digital manga subscription and volume purchase service

- Website type: Manga platform
- Available in: English
- Founders: Abbas Jaffery; Evan Minto; Adela Chang; Krystyn Neisess; Ken Urata
- Industry: Entertainment
- Parent: KiraKira Media, Inc.
- Website: omoi.com
- Launched: June 28, 2021; 5 years ago
- Current status: Active

Omoi (formerly, Azuki) is digital manga publishing and distribution service that aggregates English-translated manga legally from publishers such as Kodansha, Futabasha, Coamix, and Kaiten Books for reading online. Content is made available to read on the Omoi website, iOS app, or Android app through a single linked account, and readers may either subscribe monthly for access to thousands of chapters, or unlock manga volumes via individual purchases. Omoi also translates manga in-house and publishes series exclusive to its service such as Natsume & Natsume and Turning the Tables on the Seatmate Killer.

== History ==
KiraKira Media Inc. was established in California in early 2020. Three of its four founders are former Crunchyroll employees. The Azuki service officially launched to the public on June 28, 2021.

In March 2022, Azuki received a $500,000 investment from Y Combinator, and officially joined the Y Combinator W22 batch.

In May 2022, Azuki announced that the company would begin licensing and translating series directly from Japan, with the very first exclusive manga license being Hikaru in the Light! by Mai Matsuda. The first chapters of Hikaru in the Light! launched on the Azuki service on June 13, 2022, and serialized weekly until it ended at 4 volumes in December 2022. Later that year, Azuki licensed two new series, My Dear Detective: Mitsuko's Case Files and Turning the Tables on the Seatmate Killer.

In Jan 2023, Azuki announced that the service would no longer be publishing Kodansha's simulpubs in accordance with updated policy from Kodansha and that 13 simulpubs series from Kodansha would be removed from the Azuki catalog. The same simulpub series were removed from all other manga publishing platforms at the same time. Around the same time, Azuki acquired the license for I Fell for a Fujoshi, which began serializing in February.

In March 2023, Azuki began distributing downloadable, DRM-free ebooks of its exclusive series.

During the remainder of 2023, Azuki obtained four more exclusive licenses: Crescent Moon Marching, Mecha-Ude: Mechanical Arms, Our Aimless Nights, and You're So Sloppy, Hotta-sensei. Azuki also finalized deals with publishers MediaDo International and Medibang! to add over 150 new series to its catalog.

In November 2025, Azuki was rebranded as Omoi. Co-founder and marketing director Evan Minto described the new name as representative of "a new phase" for the company, adding that "it also reduces the brand confusion around our old name, which was in use by multiple companies in other industries.

== Titles ==
=== Manga ===
==== Published by Omoi ====
- Crescent Moon Marching
- Delinquent Detective: Sukeban Deka
- The Elf Husband and Dwarf Wife
- Georgie
- Hikaru in the Light!
- I Fell for a Fujoshi
- Love Is the Sweetest Journey
- Mecha-Ude: Mechanical Arms
- My Dear Detective: Mitsuko's Case Files
- Natsume & Natsume
  - Natsume & Natsume: More Perfume
- Our Aimless Nights
- Shonen Racket
- A Snow Fox at the Northern Fort
- The Sword of Paros
- Tsuyo-Girl: Taking Charge
- Turning the Tables on the Seatmate Killer
- Walking Home with You

==== Early Access on Omoi ====
- Gacha Girls Corps
- The Yakuza's Guide to Babysitting

==== Licensed to read on Omoi ====
- A Devotion that Changes Worlds
- A Kiss, For Real
- A Livid Lady's Guide to Getting Even: How I Crushed My Homeland with My Mighty Grimoires
- A Love Story Between My Boss and I
- A Side Character's Love Story
- A Silent Voice
- A Springtime with Ninjas
- A Tempest of Cage
- A Tunnel of Spring Rain
- Ace of the Diamond
- Again!!
- Aho-Girl: A Clueless Girl
- Air Gear
- Ajin: Demi-Human
- Alicia's Diet Quest
- ALIVE
- All Out!!
- All-Rounder Meguru
- Another Love Story Between My Trainee and I
- Ao-chan Can't Study!
- Aoba-kun's Confessions
- Are You Lost?
- Arisa
- ARK
- As the Gods Will The Second Series
- ASHIDAKA – The Iron Hero
- Atsumori-kun's Bride-to-Be
- Attack on Titan
- Attack on Titan: Before the Fall
- Attack on Titan: Junior High
- Ayanashi
- Basilisk
- Battle Angel Alita
- Battle Angel Alita Mars Chronicle
- Battle Angel Alita: Last Order
- Beauty Bunny
- Beware the Kamiki Brothers!
- Black Panther and Sweet 16
- Blame!
- Blame! Academy and So On
- Blitz
- Bloody Monday
- Boarding School Juliet
- Buffalo 5 Girls
- Cagaster
- Cage of Eden
- Can I Kiss You Every Day?
- Can You Just Die, My Darling?
- Cases and Then Some
- Cells at Work!
- Chi's Sweet Home
- Chihayafuru
- Children of Mu-Town
- Clockwork Planet
- Complex Age
- Confessions of a 35 Year Old
- Coppelion
- Country Called America
- Crueler Than Dead
- DAYS
- Deborah is My Rival
- Deathtopia
- Defying Kurosaki-kun
- Descending Stories
- Devils' Line
- Diary of My Daily Failures
- Domestic Girlfriend
- Doomsday Cleaning
- Dragon Daddy Diaries: A Girl Grows to Greatness
- Drifting Net Cafe
- Drowning Love
- EDENS ZERO
- Egwin & Friends
- Ekikoi: The Young Miss Falls for the Station Attendant
- Elegant Yokai Apartment Life
- En Chan's House
- Enchanted Racer
- Fade-Away Bunny
- Fairy Girls
- Fairy Tail
- Fairy Tail Blue Mistral
- Fairy Tail Ice Trail
- Fairy Tail S
- Fairy Tail: 100 Years Quest
- Fairy Tail: City Hero
- Fire Force
- Flower Demon Door of the Sakaimeya
- Flying Witch
- Fort of Apocalypse
- FukuFuku Kitten Tales
- Fuuka
- Gakuen Prince
- Ghost in the Shell Stand Alone Complex
- Giant Killing
- Gleipnir
- Golosseum
- Goodbye! I'm Being Reincarnated!
- Granny Girl Hinata-chan
- Grin, Grin, Grin
- Guardy Girls
- Gourmet Glutton
- Hachi/Ritsu
- Happiness
- Hotaru's Way
- House of the Sun
- Hozuki's Coolheadedness
- I Am Here!
- I Can't Help Falling in Love
- I Fell for a Fujoshi
- I Got Married to a Man I Can't Stand
- I Want to Escape from Princess Lessons
- I Want Kumagaya to Teach Me Everything
- I Want to Hold Aono-kun so Badly I Could Die
- Ikyoudo
- Il Manga Milione
- I'll Quit Traveling...
- I'm a (Fake) Saint Who Was Summoned to Another World, But Apparently I'm Fated to Die If I Don't Marry the Prince
- I'm in Love and It's the End of the World
- I'm Standing on a Million Lives
- In/Spectre
- Insufficient Direction
- Interplanetary Intercourse
- Interviews with Monster Girls
- Inuyashiki
- Invisible Parade
- Itazura na Kiss
- Kakafukaka
- Kakushigoto: My Dad's Secret Ambition
- Kamikamikaeshi
- Karate Heat
- Kasane
- Kira-kun Today
- Kiss Him, Not Me
- Kiss Me at the Stroke of Midnight
- Kitchen Princess
- Knights of Sidonia
- Kokkoku: Moment by Moment
- Kotonoha
- Land of the Lustrous
- L DK
- Leaving Our Truths to the Shooting Star
- Let's Dance a Waltz
- Lily Marble
- Look Into My Eyes
- Love and Lies
- Love Hina
- Love in Focus
- Love Massage: Melting Beauty Treatment
- Love Me, My Knight
- Love Only You
- Loving You When the World Ended
- Lush
- Maga-Tsuki
- Magical Sempai
- Manga Dogs
- Mardock Scramble
- Masuda's Got a Hold on Shibata
- Matching Our Answers
- Memoirs of Amorous Gentlemen
- Missions of Love
- Monthly Shoujo Sunday
- Mr. (Former) Yakuza is in Over His Head with Me, and I Can't Escape Him
- Ms. Itsuya
- My Boss's Kitten
- My Boy in Blue
- My Boyfriend in Orange
- My Dad's the Queen of all VTubers?!
- My Little Monster
- My Sadistic Boyfriend
- My Sweet Girl
- My Wife is Wagatsuma-san
- Myosotis
- Mysterious Girlfriend X
- Natalie and Mysterious Takumi
- Negima!
- Nekogahara
- Ninja Rookie
- Nodame Cantabile
- Noragami: Stray God
- O Maidens in Your Savage Season
- Our Fake Marriage
- Our Precious Conversations
- Parasyte
- Peach Girl
- Peach Heaven
- Pitch-Black Ten
- Playboy
- Pop Life
- Prince of Lan Ling
- Princess Jellyfish
- Princess Resurrection
- Pumpkin Scissors
- Rabbit Game
- Rave Master
- Real Account
- Real Girl
- Reborn to Master the Blade: From Hero-King to Extraordinary Squire
- Red Riding Hood's Wolf Apprentice: False Stars
- Red Riding Hood's Wolf Apprentice: Final Testament to the Moon
- Ripples
- Sammy and Onokoro
- Sankarea
- Savage Garden
- Sawanabe Zombie
- Say I Love You
- Sayonara Zetsubou-Sensei
- School Rumble
- Sherlock Bones
- Shojo Fight
- Shugo Chara Chan!
- Shugo Chara!
- Smile Down the Runway
- Somari and the Guardian of the Forest
- Space Brothers
- Spear
- Spill!
- Spoof on Titan
- Spring Storm
- Stairway to Love
- Starving Anonymous
- Suzuka
- Sweet Seduction: Under the Same Roof with the Guy I Hate
- Sweeter Than Cake
- Sweetness and Lightning
- Thank You, My Mistakes
- That Time I Got Reincarnated as a Slime
- That Wolf-Boy Is Mine!
- The 10 O' Clock Rule
- The Blood Red Boy
- The Diary of Ochibi-san
- The Fantasy Ends Today
- The Flowers of Evil
- The Full-Time Wife Escapist
- The Horrors of Noroi Michiru
- The Key in the Cage
- The Knight Cartoonist and Her Orc Editor
- The Light Conjurer
- The Mermaid Prince
- The Most Tsundere Boss in History
- The Night of No Return
- The Oblivious Saint Can't Contain Her Power: Disgraced No Longer, I'm Finding Happiness with the Prince
- The Prince in His Dark Days
- The Princess' Circumstances
- The Quintessential Quintuplets
- The Sunset of Silver
- The Town You Live In
- The Walls Between Us
- The Western Magic Hall
- The Yagyu Ninja Scrolls
- Three Seconds After Our Eyes Met
- To the Abandoned Sacred Beasts
- To Your Eternity
- Toki
- Tokyo Revengers
- Tokyo Tarareba Girls
- Tsukiko and the Satellite and other stories
- Tsuredure Children
- Until Your Bones Rot
- UQ Holder!
- Wakako Zake
- Wake Up, Sleeping Beauty
- Warm Coffee
- Watari-kun's ****** Is About to Collapse
- Welcome to the Ballroom
- When Pink Rain Falls
- Which Hana?
- Yamada-kun and the Seven Witches
- Your Lie in April
- You're So Sloppy, Hotta-Sensei
- Yozakura Quartet
- ZAN
- Zangi Onden
- Zanmu Labyrinth
- Zombie Makeout Club

== See also ==
- Kodansha USA
- Futabasha
- Coamix
- Kaiten Books
