= Not Me That Went Viral =

2022 novel and its adaptation

- Cover of the tankōbon edition of novel

俺ではない炎上 (Ore Dewanai Enjō)
- Genre: Drama; Suspense; Thriller
- Novel
- Written by: Akinari Asakura
- Published by: Futabasha
- Published: May 19, 2022
- Manga
- Written by: Akinari Asakura
- Illustrated by: Ōtori556
- Published by: Futabasha
- Imprint: Action Comics
- Magazine: Manga Action
- Original run: July 15, 2025 – present
- Volumes: 2
- Live-action film
- Directed by: Atsuhiro Yamada
- Written by: Tamio Hayashi
- Music by: Yoshitaka Fujimoto
- Studio: Amuse Creative Studio; Shochiku
- Released: September 26, 2025
- Runtime: 165 minutes
- icon

Not Me That Went Viral (Japanese: 俺ではない炎上, Hepburn: Ore Dewanai Enjō; lit. 'It's Not Me in Flames') is a Japanese novel written by Akinari Asakura. It was published by Futabasha in May 2022. The novel received a manga adaptation illustrated by Ōtori556 in July 2025 and a live-action film adaptation in September 2025.

== Plot ==
One day, Taisuke Yamagata, who works for a major house builder, is accused of murder, after an image of a female college student's corpse is shared from a social media account that was thought to belong to him. Taisuke, who has no recollection of the incident, pleads his innocence, but no one believes him. In the blink of an eye, all of Taisuke's personal information is exposed, causing a huge uproar on the internet, and Taisuke ends up being chased all over Japan. Taisuke makes a desperate escape as he tries to find the real culprit who committed the crime.

== Characters ==
Taisuke Yamagata (山縣泰介, Yamagata Taisuke)
Portrayed by: Hiroshi Abe
Sakura (サクラ)
Portrayed by: Mana Ashida
Sumiyoshi Hatsuhaba (藤原大祐, Hatsuhaba Sumiyoshi)
Portrayed by: Taiyu Fujiwara

== Media ==
=== Novel ===
Not Me That Went Viral is a novel written by Akinari Asakura. He previously wrote stories about young people in their adolescence. He decided to broaden his readership by choosing the theme "online shaming", a topic he believes that "everyone in modern times could potentially be involved in ". It was published by Futabasha in 2022.

==== Publications ====
- May 19, 2022: Not Me That Went Viral (tankōbon), ISBN 978-4-575-24519-6, Futabasha
- June 12, 2024: Not Me That Went Viral (bunkobon), ISBN 978-4-575-52758-2, Futabasha

=== Manga ===
A manga adaptation of the novel illustrated by Ōtori556 began serialization in Futabasha's Manga Action magazine on July 15, 2025. The first tankōbon volume was released on September 25, 2025, coinciding with the release of the live-action film adaptation. As of October 2026, three volumes have been released.

==== Volumes ====
No.	Release date	ISBN
1	September 25, 2025	978-4-575-86136-5
2	May 28, 2026	978-4-575-86227-0
3	October 29, 2026	978-4-575-86286-7

=== Live-action film ===
Tamio Hayashi wrote the scripted of the film, and Atsuhiro Yamada was then selecter as the director. After reading the script and noticing that the humor is the same as in the original work, Yamada decided to direct the film in a "lighthearted, entertaining style." He then cast Hiroshi Abe as the lead actor, playing the role of Taisuke Yamagata. Many of the scenes were filmed in Hamamatsu. The film's theme song is "🔥Okkanai🔥" (🔥おっかない🔥) performed by Wanima.

A live-action film adaptation was announced in January 2025. The first trailer was released on April 25. As part of the promotion of the film, Shochiku launched a fictional social networking service called "Guaranteed Social Media Virality" (絶対にバズるSNS, Zettai ni Bazuru Esuen'esu), where no matter what photo someone posts, it is guaranteed to go viral. It uses an AI that has been trained to understand the thought process behind "unreasonable fault-finding" on social media; then the AI will thoroughly search for flaws in the image posted by a user, automatically generating a scenario for online outrage.

It was released on September 26, 2025, and was screened in over 300 theaters across Japan.

== Analysis ==
Not Me That Went Viral is told from multiple perspectives. Ossy from Dengeki Online noted that the novel uses "narrative trickery in its writing", while the live-action films "cleverly uses its structure to mislead the audience."

Toshiaki Endo of Real Sound noted that Asakusa has "woven a large mechanism" into the novel's story, adding that he depicts the "selfish way in which individuals think, more than the mechanism of the internet that amplifies and spreads information."

== Reception ==
The book reached 3rd place at The Asahi Shimbun Weekly Top Seller on September 10, 2022. It was nominated for the 37th Yamamoto Shūgorō Prize in 2023. The book was a finalist and won the Excellent Award at the 7th National Middle High School Bibliobattle in 2024.

Kensuke Nonami of The Asahi Shimbun praised the novel, calling it a "cleverly crafted piece". Maki Tomokazu of Sponichi praised the film, stating that it "flows smoothly from beginning to end", and that, "in a good way, it doesn't try to be flashy".
