= 17-sai. =

2004 manga

17-sai. (17歳。, Jūnana-sai.; "17 Years Old") is a manga with the story by Seiji Fujii and art by Yōji Kamata, published in 2004–2005. It depicts the kidnapping and rape of a girl, based on the murder of Junko Furuta. It was published in Japan by Futabasha and serialized in Manga Action.

It was published in Spanish in Spain by Ediciones Mangaline as 17 Años ("17 Years"), in French in France by naBan Editions as 17 ans, une chronique du mal ("17 years, a chronicle of evil"), and in Taiwan by Tong Li Publishing.

== Synopsis ==
In 1996, 25-year-old Hiroki Marukawa, who works as a truck driver, visits the dreaded E-ku, Tokyo, for work and is shocked to find that the house where the tragedy occurred is not there.

Eight years ago, in 1988, 17-year-old Hiroki and his bad friend Takashi were threatened by the head of a gang called Miyamoto and kidnapped and imprisoned 17-year-old high school girl Sachiko Ozawa. In order to search for her missing twin sister, Miki Ozawa, 17, steps up.

== Plot ==
A group of gang members led by Miyamoto capture Sachiko Ozawa, a high school student, in Chiba Prefecture, and after assaulting her at a hotel, confine her at a house in E-Ward, eastern Tokyo, where they commit acts of rape and torture. Her sister Miki frantically attempts to find her and takes the initiative, distributing flyers. Hiroki Marukawa, the main character and a schoolmate of Miki, is so intimidated by the other characters that he outs Sachiko when she attempts to hide, and Hiroki fails to disclose his information to Miki, despite being prompted by Miki. Despite the hazards to her life, Miki is led to the house by gangsters, and, along with Sachiko, is rescued by police following on a tip before the gangsters attempt to kill her. Hiroki, unlike his fellow co-conspirators, is tried as a juvenile and adjudicated delinquent, being incarcerated at a reformatory, instead of being tried as an adult and going to a prison for adults. Hiroki becomes the leader of his dormitory at the reformatory. As fellow gang member Takashi Ikuno is the only murdered victim, ringleader Miyamoto avoids the death penalty. Miki does not forgive Hiroki despite his pleas, as he failed to rescue Sachiko at opportune times. Sachiko ultimately survives her torture and injuries.

== Characters ==
- Hiroki Marukawa (丸川 広木, Marukawa Hiroki) – The main character. He is involved in the kidnapping but never gets the courage to inform Miki when she asks him for information.
- Sachiko Ozawa (大沢 幸子, Ōzawa Sachiko) – The kidnapping victim, who originates from Chiba Prefecture.
- Miki Ozawa (大沢 見聞き, Ōzawa Miki) – The younger twin sister of the kidnapping victim who searches for her. Hiroki attends Miki's school, while Sachiko attends a separate high school.
- Miyamoto (宮本) – The lead kidnapper. He is to likely to avoid the death penalty as Sachiko survives; the death penalty in Japan is unlikely to be granted to a person responsible for the murder of a single individual.
- Takashi Ikuno (逝くの 高し, Ikuno Takashi) – A conspirator with Miyamoto who is killed, as Miyamoto perceives him as betraying the group. He is fatally beaten in an isolated field, and his body is placed in a disused refrigerator. Hiroki fails to get assistance after the gang asks him to help move the body.
- Daisuke Tsuji (辻褄 大助, Tsuji Daisuke) – A conspirator with Miyamoto.
- Katsuya Mizuno (水野 克也, Mizuno Katsuya) – A conspirator with Miyamoto. His house in E-Ward, Tokyo, is the site where the majority of the confinement and acts of torture occur.
- Seiichi Ozawa (大沢 誠一, Ōzawa Seiichi) - The girls' father. He lives apart from his wife due to his job, and Sachiko lives with him as her high school is near his residence.
- Tokiko Ozawa (大沢 時子, Ōzawa Tokiko) - The girls' mother; Miki lives with her.
- Jun Tanaka (田中 淳, Tanaka Jun) - A police officer in Chiba Prefecture at the North Police station who investigates Sachiko's kidnapping.
- Furuya (古屋) - A gangster. Furuya, who is Miyamoto's superior, leads Miki to Sachiko after Miki contacts him. Furuya agrees to let Sachiko go, but Miyamoto disables him by hitting him in the head with a baseball bat.

== See also ==
- Murder of Junko Furuta
