= Shima-san =

Japanese manga series

- First tankōbon volume cover

島さん
- Genre: Drama, slice of life
- Manga
- Written by: Yōbundō Kawano
- Published by: Futabasha
- Imprint: Action Comics
- Magazine: Manga Action
- Original run: April 21, 2020 – present
- Volumes: 8

Shima-san (島さん) is a Japanese manga series written and illustrated by Yōbundō Kawano. It began serialization in Futabasha's Manga Action magazine in April 2020.

== Synopsis ==
The series is centered around Shima-san, an elderly male part-timer at a convenience store, and his interactions with customers.

== Publication ==
Written and illustrated by Yōbundō Kawano, Shima-san began serialization in Futabasha's Manga Action magazine on April 21, 2020. Its chapters have been collected into eight tankōbon volumes as of January 2026.

No.	Release date	ISBN
1	January 28, 2021	978-4-575-85542-5
2	July 28, 2021	978-4-575-85612-5
3	April 27, 2022	978-4-575-85710-8
4	February 28, 2023	978-4-575-85815-0
5	October 26, 2023	978-4-575-85903-4
6	July 25, 2024	978-4-575-85989-8
7	April 24, 2025	978-4-575-86082-5
8	January 29, 2026	978-4-575-86186-0
9	December 24, 2026	978-4-575-86310-9

== Reception ==
By July 2024, the series had over 1 million copies in circulation.
