= Walking Home with You =

Japanese manga series

- First tankōbon volume cover, featuring Naoki Satō (left) and Shun Satō (right)

放課後帰宅びより (Hōkago Kitaku Biyori)
- Genre: Romantic comedy
- Manga
- Written by: Mai Matsuda
- Published by: Futabasha
- English publisher: NA: Omoi
- Imprint: Action Comics
- Magazine: Manga Action
- Original run: August 1, 2023 – present
- Volumes: 7
- Anime television series
- Original network: Nippon TV
- Original run: April 2027 – scheduled
- icon

Walking Home with You (放課後帰宅びより, Hōkago Kitaku Biyori; lit. 'A Fine Day for Going Home After School') is a Japanese manga series written and illustrated by Mai Matsuda. It began serialization in Futabasha's Manga Action magazine in August 2023, and has been compiled into seven volumes as of September 2026. An anime television series adaptation is set to premiere in April 2027.

== Plot ==
The series follows Shun Satō, a first-year high school student who has become annoyed at others constantly requesting him to join a club. He ends up becoming involved with an upperclassman Naoki Satō after she overhears him complaining about his desire not to join a club. The two bond over going home together every day as part of the "Hyper-Epic Head-Home Club".

== Characters ==
Shun Satō (佐藤 瞬, Satō Shun)
One of the two protagonists of the series, he is a freshman at Wasibiyama High. He becomes annoyed that people keep asking him to join athletic clubs due to his exceptional height. He previously played football in junior high school, only for his playing days to end due to an injury. He later develops a crush on Chokki-chan.
Naoki Satō (佐藤 希望, Satō Naoki)
The second protagonist of the series, she is an upperclassman at Shun's school and the founder of the "Hyper-Epic Head-Home Club" (ハイパー帰宅部, Haipā Kitakubu). She invites him to join the club when Shun said Naoki’s signature catchphrase, "I want to go home", next to her. At first, she dragged him around and in the end managed to have him join her club. She is nicknamed after her catchphrase, as "Chokki-chan" (直帰ちゃん), meaning to go straight home.

== Media ==
=== Manga ===
The series is written and illustrated by Mai Matsuda. It began serialization in Futabasha's Manga Action magazine on August 1, 2023. The first tankōbon volume was published on January 26, 2024; seven volumes have been released as of October 2026.

During their panel at Anime Expo 2026 panel, KiraKira Media announced that they had licensed the series and added to their Omoi manga service on August 18, 2026.

No.	Release date	ISBN
1	January 26, 2024	978-4-575-85928-7
1. Walk Home with Me (一緒に帰ろう, Issho ni Kaerō); 2. To the Convenience Store (コンビニ行こう, Konbini Ikō); 3. How Should We Keep in Touch? (連絡手段を考えよう, Renraku Shudan o Kangaeyō); 4. Aim for Victory (勝利を目指そう, Shōri o Mezhasō); 5. Optimizing the Umbrella (傘をうまく使おう, Kasa o Umaku Tsukaō); 6. Time For a Study Sesh (テスト勉強しよう, Tesuto Benkyō Shiyō); 7. Friendly Cooperation (友達と行動しよう, Tomodachi to Kōdō Shiyō); 8. Let's Go to the River (川に行こう, Kawa ni Ikō)
2	June 27, 2024	978-4-575-85981-2
9. Hanging Out at Home (家で遊ぼう, Ie de Asobō); 10. Supernatural Investigation (オカルトを研究しよう, Okaruto o Kenkyū Shiyō); 11. Fireworks Viewing (花火を見よう, Hanabi o Miyō); 12. Superstitions (願掛けしよう, Gankake Shiyō); 13. Making the Most of the Culture Festival (文化祭を楽しもう, Bunkasai o Tanoshimō); 14. Let's Skip the Afterparty (後夜祭を抜け出そう, Kōyasai o Nukedasō); 15. Kako no Koe o Kikō (過去の声を聴こう); 16. Aki o Hiroi ni Ikō (秋を拾いに行こう); 17. Yagi o Mi ni Ikō (ヤギを見に行こう)
3	October 24, 2024	978-4-575-86019-1
18. Ocha Shiyō (お茶しよう); 19. Hitori de Kaerō (一人で帰ろう); 20. Dan o Torō (暖を取ろう); 21. Kazoku to Hanasō (家族と話そう); 22. Kurisumasu o Tanoshimō (クリスマスを楽しもう); 23. Hatsumōde ni Ikō (初詣に行こう); 24. Yukiotoko o Saghasō (雪男を探そう); 25. Okashi o Tsukurō (お菓子を作ろう); 26. Atarashii Koto o Hajimeyō (新しいことを始めよう)
4	March 27, 2025	978-4-575-86072-6
27. Nichijō o Torimodosō (日常を取り戻そう); 28. Shin'nyūsei to Kōryū Shiyō (新入生と交流しよう); 29. Jitensha ni Norō (自転車に乗ろう); 30. Kyūgisai o Tanoshimō (球技祭を楽しもう); 31. Shashin o Torō (写真を撮ろう); 32. Kyūkaku o Togisumaseyō (嗅覚を研ぎ澄ませよう); 33. Himitsu no Chōsa o Shiyō (秘密の調査をしよう); 34. E o Kakō (絵を描こう); 35. Natsu no Keikaku o Tateyō (夏の計画を立てよう)
5	October 23, 2025	978-4-575-86146-4
36. Gasshuku Shiyō (合宿しよう); 37. Hotaru o Mi ni Ikō (ホタルを見に行こう); 38. Suimin o Torō (睡眠を取ろう); 39. Umeshu o Tsukurō (梅酒を作ろう); 40. Natsu no Yoru o Tanoshimō (夏の夜を楽しもう); 40. Omake (おまけ); 41. Bunkasai no Junbi o Shiyō (文化祭の準備をしよう); 42. Akiya o Chōsa Shiyō (空き家を調査しよう); 43. Hanabi Taikai ni Ikō (花火大会に行こう); 44. Natsu no Ato o Nokosō (夏の跡を残そう)
6	June 11, 2026	978-4-575-86234-8
45. Pawā Appu Shiyō (パワーアップしよう); 46. Me o Mitsukeyō (芽を見つけよう); 47. Bunkasai o Seikō Saseyō (文化祭を成功させよう); 48. Gyaru o Manabō (ギャルを学ぼう); 49. Kōyasai o Tanoshimō (後夜祭を楽しもう); 50. Shinboku o Fukameyō (親睦を深めよう); 51. Sankōsho o Kaō (参考書を買おう); 52. Taiikusai o Tanoshimō (体育祭を楽しもう); 53. Kakenukeyō (駆け抜けよう); 54. Omake (おまけ)
7	October 8, 2026	978-4-575-86276-8
54. Sukoshi Mirai no Hanashi o Shiyō (少し未来の話をしよう); 55. Susumu Michi o Erabō (進む道を選ぼう); 56. Omamori o Tsukurō (お守りを作ろう); 57. Ashinami o Soroeyō (足並みを揃えよう); 58. Koneko o Mukaeireyō (子猫を迎え入れよう); 59. Puranetariumu ni Ikō (プラネタリウムに行こう); 60. Shūgaku Ryokō o Tanoshimō (修学旅行を楽しもう); 61. Nami no Oto o Kikō (波の音を聞こう); 62. Minna to Chigau Koto o Shiyō (みんなと違うことをしよう)

==== Chapters not yet in tankōbon format ====
These chapters have yet to be published in a tankōbon volume.

63. Dokidoki Saseyō (ドキドキさせよう)
64. Rāmen Tabeyō (ラーメン食べよう)
65. Omimai ni Ikō (お見舞いに行こう)
66. Shōjiki ni Hanasō (正直に話そう)

=== Anime ===
An anime adaptation was announced in the fourth volume of the manga released on March 27, 2025. It was later revealed to be a television series that is set to premiere on Nippon TV in April 2027.

== Reception ==
The series was nominated for the 11th Next Manga Awards in the print category in 2025, and won the Nichirei Prize. It was nominated for the same award in 2026, and was ranked eighteenth.

== See also ==
- Hikaru in the Light!, another manga series by the same author
