= Shindō (manga) =

Japanese manga by Akira Sasō

- First volume of Shindō written and illustrated by Akira Sasō, published by Futabasha

神童
- Manga
- Written by: Akira Sasō
- Published by: Futabasha
- Magazine: Weekly Manga Action
- Original run: April 16, 1997 – June 9, 1998
- Volumes: 4
- Novel
- Written by: Koji Hagiuda
- Published by: Futabasha
- Published: March 15, 2007
- Live-action film
- Directed by: Koji Hagiuda
- Written by: Kousuke Mukai
- Released: April 27, 2007
- Runtime: 120 minutes

Shindō (Japanese: 神童; "Prodigy") is a Japanese manga written and illustrated by Akira Sasō. The story depicts a 13-year-old piano child prodigy, Uta Naruse, who helps 19-year-old Wao Kikuna, enter a conservatory to study the piano.

== Media ==
The manga was serialized in Futabasha's seinen manga magazine, Weekly Manga Action. The individual chapters were collected into four bound volumes, which Futabasha released from May 28, 1998, to August 28, 1998. Futabasha re-released the manga into three volumes, which were all released on December 19, 2003.

The manga was adapted into a novel by Koji Hagiuda, which Futabasha released on March 15, 2007. Epic/Sony Records released a soundtrack CD on March 21, 2007.

The novel was further adapted into a live action film, with Koji Hagiuda directing his own novel and screenplay written by Kousuke Mukai, which premiered in Japan on April 27, 2007. Riko Narumi was cast as Uta and Kenichi Matsuyama was cast as Wao. The theme music was performed by Mito of Clammbon. VAP released the film's DVD on November 21, 2007.

== Reception ==
The manga received the excellence award in the manga division for the 2nd Japan Media Arts Festival and the award for excellence for the 3rd Tezuka Osamu Cultural Prize in 1999.

The Japan Times' Mark Schilling commends Riko Narumi's performance as Uta, "which is forceful, but somehow mysterious, like the fierce-eyed girls painted by Yoshitomo Nara." Chris Magee commends the film as "a truly touching and surprisingly grown up look at just how difficult it can be for people, young or old, to come to terms with their talents and strengths, but also their faults and their weaknesses."
