= My Dear Detective: Mitsuko's Case Files =

Japanese manga series

- First tankōbon volume cover

きみは謎解きのマシェリ (Kimi wa Nazotoki no Masheri)
- Genre: Historical; Mystery
- Manga
- Written by: Natsumi Ito
- Published by: Futabasha
- English publisher: NA: Omoi (digital) Seven Seas Entertainment (print)
- Imprint: Action Comics
- Magazine: Manga Action; (May 18, 2021–May 21, 2024); Web Comic Action; (October 18, 2024–October 17, 2025)
- Original run: May 18, 2021 – October 17, 2025
- Volumes: 9

My Dear Detective: Mitsuko's Case Files (きみは謎解きのマシェリ, Kimi wa Nazotoki no Masheri) is a Japanese manga series written and illustrated by Natsumi Ito. It was serialized on Futabasha's seinen manga magazine Manga Action and on the Web Comic Action website from May 2021 to October 2025.

== Synopsis ==
Set in Showa era Japan in the 1930s, the series is centered around Mitsuko Hoshino, a female detective in a time where detectives were only male. While at work, Mitsuko deals with constant sexism and calls for her to quit her job, but remains determined to carry out her work. She receives a request from a waiter named Saku Yoshida to solve the case of lost shoes at the café he works at. Saku later joins her to solve future cases.

== Publication ==
Written and illustrated by Natsumi Ito, My Dear Detective: Mitsuko's Case Files began serialization on Futabasha's seinen manga magazine Manga Action on May 18, 2021. The series ended serialization in Manga Action on May 21, 2024, and was transferred to the Web Comic Action website resuming on October 18, 2024, and ending on October 17, 2025. Its chapters were collected in nine tankōbon volumes released from October 28, 2021, to December 25, 2025.

During their panel at Anime Expo 2022, KiraKira Media announced that they added the series to their Azuki website and app. On May 15, 2024, Seven Seas Entertainment announced that they would begin to release volumes of the series in October 2024.

No.	Original release date	Original ISBN	English release date	English ISBN
1	October 28, 2021	978-4-575-85650-7	October 8, 2024	979-8-89160-256-4
1. "The Glass Slipper"; 2. "The Perplexing Picture"; 3. "The Lady on Stage (Part 1)"; 4. "The Lady on Stage (Part 2)"; 5. "The Innocent Monster (Part 1)"
2	March 28, 2022	978-4-575-85704-7	February 4, 2025	979-8-89160-744-6
6. "The Innocent Monster (Part 2)"; 7. "The Innocent Monster (Part 3)"; 8. "A Silent Night for Christmas"; 9. "His Brother's Keeper (Part 1)"; 10. "His Brother's Keeper (Part 2)"
3	September 28, 2022	978-4-575-85764-1	June 10, 2025	979-8-89160-755-2
11. "His Brother's Keeper (Part 3)"; 12. "His Brother's Keeper (Part 4)"; 13. "Little Miss Sawako's First Love"; 14. "The Proof Is in the Pudding"; 15. "Scarlet Fingertips (Part 1)"
4	March 28, 2023	978-4-575-85826-6	October 14, 2025	979-8-89160-758-3
16. "Scarlet Fingertips"; 17. "Secret 'Neath the Organ"; 18. "Delivery Dreamer"; 19. "It Started at Tokyo Station (Part 1)"; 20. "It Started at Tokyo Station (Part 2)"
5	September 28, 2023	978-4-575-85894-5	February 17, 2026	979-8-89373-685-4
21. "A Murky Denouement (Part 1)"; 22. "A Murky Denouement (Part 2)"; 23. "The Turtle Household"; 24. "The Swordsman's Code"; 25. "A Secret on Wings (Part 1)"
6	March 28, 2024	978-4-575-85950-8	June 23, 2026	979-8-89373-686-1
26. "A Secret on Wings (Part 2)"; 27. "Where the Veil Went"; 28. "Mitsuko's Mother Is in Town"; 29. "His Boy and His Billiards"; 30. "The Faux Fox (Part 1)"
7	November 28, 2024	978-4-575-86029-0	November 10, 2026	979-8-89561-540-9
8	May 29, 2025	978-4-575-86096-2	May 25, 2027	979-8-89765-627-1
9	December 25, 2025	978-4-575-86177-8	June 15, 2027	979-8-89863-595-4

== Reception ==
MyAnimeList users recommended the series in 2023 for its unique story and art.
