= Tomodachi × Monster =

Japanese manga series

- Cover of the first volume

トモダチ×モンスター (Tomodachi × Monsutā)
- Genre: Action, horror, parody
- Manga
- Written by: Yoshihiko Inui
- Published by: Futabasha
- English publisher: NA: Seven Seas Entertainment
- Magazine: Manga Action
- Original run: 17 June 2014 – 27 June 2015
- Volumes: 3

Tomodachi × Monster (トモダチ×モンスター, Tomodachi × Monsutā; lit. Friend × Monster) is a Japanese manga series written and illustrated by Yoshihiko Inui. The series began publication in Futabasha's seinen magazine Manga Action on 17 June 2014, and the third and final volume was released in June 2015. Seven Seas Entertainment licensed the manga for publication in North America.

The series is a "dark parody" of "pocket-monster" stories such as Pokémon.

== Volume list ==
No.	Original release date	Original ISBN	English release date	English ISBN
1	27 December 2014	978-4-575-84553-2	23 February 2016	978-1-626923-04-1
2	27 March 2015	978-4-575-84599-0	17 May 2016	978-1-626922-9-69
3	27 June 2015	978-4-575-84636-2	20 September 2016	978-1-626923-31-7
