= Crime and Punishment: A Falsified Romance =

Japanese manga series by Naoyuki Ochiai

- The cover of the first volume of Crime and Punishment: A Falsified Romance, showing the protagonist Miroku Tachi

罪と罰 A Falsified Romance (Tsumi to Batsu: A Falsified Romance)
- Manga
- Written by: Naoyuki Ochiai
- Published by: Futabasha
- English publisher: JManga
- Magazine: Manga Action
- Original run: January 23, 2007 – March 15, 2011
- Volumes: 10
- Television drama
- Directed by: Manabu Aso
- Written by: Yumiko Kamiyama; Tadasuke Fujimoto
- Music by: Kōji Endō
- Original network: WOWOW
- Original run: April 29, 2012 – June 3, 2012
- Episodes: 6

Crime and Punishment: A Falsified Romance (罪と罰 A Falsified Romance, Tsumi to Batsu: A Falsified Romance) is a Japanese seinen manga written and illustrated by Naoyuki Ochiai. A modern adaptation of Fyodor Dostoyevsky's Crime and Punishment, it is about Miroku Tachi, a hikikomori who decides to kill the leader of a student prostitution ring and take her money. The manga was serialized in Futabasha's manga magazine Manga Action from January 23, 2007, to March 15, 2011, and was collected into ten tankōbon volumes. The manga was licensed in North America by JManga and was one of its release titles. In 2012, the manga was adapted into a live-action drama by WOWOW with six episodes.

== Media ==
=== Manga ===
The manga is an adaptation of Fyodor Dostoyevsky's Crime and Punishment by Naoyuki Ochiai. It was serialized in Futabasha's manga magazine Manga Action from January 23, 2007, to March 15, 2011 and was collected into ten tankōbon volumes. The manga was licensed in North America by JManga and was one of its release titles when the website launched on August 17, 2011. JManga published the first five volumes before becoming defunct. The manga was also published in France by Delcourt (under the title Syndrome 1866), in Taiwan by Ever Glory Publishing and in Italy by Goen.

==== Chapter list ====
No.	Release date	ISBN
1	July 3, 2007	978-4-575-83376-8
1. "Horse and Iron Bar" (馬と鉄棒, Uma to Tesubō); 2. "NEET and Whore" (ニートと娼婦, Nīto to Shōfu); 3. "Cola and Coffee" (コーラとコーヒー, Kōra to Kōhī); 4. "News and Glasses" (ニュースとメガネ, Nyūsu to Megane); 5. "Observations and Records" (観察と記録, Kansatsu to Kiroku); 6. "Witch and Writer" (魔女とライター, Majo to Raitā); 7. "Heaven and Hell" (天国と地獄, Tengoku to Jigoku); 8. "Lies and Kisses" (嘘とくちづけ, Uso to Kuchizuke); 9. "Sun" (日輪, Nichirin)
2	November 28, 2007	978-4-575-83429-1
10. "Summer and Indecision" (夏と逡巡, Natsu to Shunjun); 11. "Miko and Tokyo" (ミーコと東京, Mīko to Tōkyō); 12. "Endings and Beginnings" (終わりと始まり, Owari to Hajimari); 13. "Trust and Contempt" (信頼と軽蔑, Shinrai to Keibetsu); 14. "Tricks and Trials" (トリックとトライアル, Torikku to Toraiaru); 15. "Resolute Action" (決行, Kekkō); 16. "Flowers and Honey" (花と蜜蜂, Hana to Mitsubachi); 17. "Dream and Reality" (夢と現実, Yume to Genjitsu); 18. "Blood and Lips" (血と唇, Chi to Kuchibiru)
3	April 28, 2008	978-4-575-83478-9
19. "Cold Steel" (白刃, Hakujin); 20. "Mirror and Key" (鏡と鍵, Kagami to Kagi); 21. "Crime and Investigation" (犯罪と捜査, Hanzai to Sōsa); 22. "Startled Hare and Hunting Dogs" (脱兎と猟犬, Datto to Ryōken); 23. "Gloves and Bicycle" (手袋と自転車, Tebukuro to Jitensha); 24. "Isolation and Stupor" (孤絶と喪神, Kozetsu to Sōshin); 25. "Door and Mailbox" (扉とポスト, Tobira to Posuto); 26. "Confusion and Coma" (混乱と昏睡, Konran to Konsui); 27. "Pride and Shame" (プライドと恥, Puraido to Haji)
4	September 27, 2008	978-4-575-83534-2
28. "Circumstance and Proverb" (情事と箴言, Jōji to Shingen); 29. "Literature and Debauchery" (文学と放蕩, Bungaku to Hōtō); 30. "Eros and Thanatos" (エロスとタナトス, Erosu to Tanatosu); 31. "Reverence and Adoration" (畏れと憧れ, Osore to Akogare); 32. "Big Sister and Little Brother" (姉と弟, Ane to Otōto); 33. "Happiness and Freedom" (幸福と自由, Kōfuku to Jiyū); 34. "Promise and Shadow" (約束と影, Yakusoku to Kage); 35. "Two Revolutions" (二つの革命, Futatsu no Kakumei); 36. "Spring Snow" (春の雪, Haru no Yuki)
5	March 28, 2009	978-4-575-83604-2
37. "Straying and Inebriation" (迷走と酩酊, Meisō to Meitei); 38. "Teacher and Student" (教師と教え子, Kyōshi to Oshiego); 39. "Transgression and Sacrifice" (破戒と犠牲, Hakai to Gisei); 40. "Violence and Bride" (暴力と花嫁, Bōryoku to Hanayome); 41. "The Crime and the Punishment" (その罪と罰, Sono Tsumi to Batsu); 42. "Shinran and Traffic Light" (親鸞と信号, Shinran to Shingō); 43. "Suspicion and Provocation" (疑惑と挑発, Giwaku to Chōhatsu); 44. "This World and Nirvana" (此岸と彼岸, Shigan to Higan); 45. "White Back" (白い背中, Shiroi Senaka)
6	July 28, 2009	978-4-575-83652-3
46. "Tears and Gaze" (涙と眼差し, Namida to Manazashi); 47. "Theme and Variation" (主題と変奏, Shudai to Hensō); 48. "Family and Secret" (家族と秘密, Kazoku to Himitsu); 49. "Determination and Parting" (決意と訣別, Ketsui to Ketsubetsu); 50. "Darkness and Light" (暗がりと灯火, Kuragari to Tomoshibi); 51. "Bible and Iron Fist" (聖書と鉄拳, Seisho to Tekken); 52. "Creature and Creature" (獣と獣, Kemono to Kemono); 53. "Coincidence and Inevitability" (偶然と必然, Gūzen to Hitsuzen); 54. "Scheme and Turnabout" (企みと転回, Takurami to Tenkai)
7	December 26, 2009	978-4-575-83710-0
55. "Malice and Passion" (悪意と受難, Akui to Junan); 56. "Anxiety and Foreboding" (不安と予感, Fuan to Yokan); 57. "Crossing the Road" (車道を渡る, Shadō o Wataru); 58. "Confession" (告白, Kokuhaku); 59. "Hatred" (憎しみ, Nikushimi); 60. "Trial and Error" (試練と躓き, Shiren to Tsumazuki); 61. "A Falsified Romance"; 62. "Contradiction and Conflict" (矛盾と葛藤, Mujun to Kattō); 63. "Apathy and Temptation" (憂鬱と誘惑, Yūutsu to Yūwaku)
8	May 28, 2010	978-4-575-83771-1
64. "Spices and Gasoline" (スパイスとガソリン, Supaisu to Gasorin); 65. "Ghosts and Paradise" (楽園と亡霊, Rakuen to Bōrei); 66. "Love and Betrayal" (愛と裏切り, Ai to Uragiri); 67. "The Flowers of Hell" (地獄に咲く花, Jigoku ni Saku Hana); 68. "Prayer and Oracle" (跪拝と託宣, Kihai to Takusen); 69. "Dusk and a Gentle Breeze" (薄明と微風, Hakumei to Soyokaze); 70. "Question and Oxygen" (空気と問いかけ, Kūki to Toikake); 71. "The Man and the Rock" (石と人間, Ishi to Ningen); 72. "Hope and Despair" (希望と絶望, Kibō to Zetsubō)
9	November 27, 2010	978-4-575-83841-1
73. "Sudo and Echika" (首藤とエチカ, Sudō to Echika); 74. "Hesitation and Phone Call" (迷いと電話, Mayoi to Denwa); 75. "Toy and Captivity" (玩具と略奪, Omocha to Ryakudatsu); 76. "Gun and Abduction" (虜と拳銃, Toriko to Kenjū); 77. "The Young Man and the Smell of Death" (若者と死臭, Wakamono to Shishū); 78. "Good-bye" (告別, Kokubetsu); 79. "The Trigger" (ひきがね, Hikigane); 80. "The End of the Dream" (夢の終わり, Yume no Owari); 81. "The Two Who Can Never Go Back" (帰れない二人, Kaerenai Futari)
10	April 28, 2011	978-4-575-83899-2
82. "Rupture" (決壊, Kekkai); 83. "Sublation" (止揚, Shiyō); 84. "Ethica"; 85. "Parting Gift and Rain" (餞と雨, Hanamuke to Ame); 86. "Ophelia and Orpheus" (オフィーリアとオルフェウス, Ofīria to Orufeusu); 87. "Departure" (旅立ち, Tabidachi); 88. "Mother and Child" (母と子, Haha to Ko); 89. "Friendship and Promise" (友情と願い, Yūjō to Negai); 90. "The Path of Light" (光の道, Hikari no Michi); 91. "Interrogation and Declaration" (誰何と宣明, Suika to Senmei); 92. "Tricks and Consequences" (手品とそれから, Tejina to Sorekara); 93. "Regeneration" (再生, Saisei)

=== Live-action drama ===
In 2012, the manga was adapted into a live-action drama with six episodes airing from April 29 to June 3 on WOWOW. The drama was directed by Manabu Aso, with the screenplay by Yumiko Kamiyama and Tadasuke Fujimoto, and music by Kōji Endō.

==== Cast ====
- Kengo Kora – Miroku Tachi
- Asami Mizukawa – Echika Ameya
- Ayumi Ito – Yoshino Tachi
- Keisuke Horibe – Kikuo Ameya
- Ai Hashimoto – Hikaru Baba
- Akiyoshi Nakao – Masamichi Yazumi
- Shōta Sometani – Haruka Mikoshiba
- Aki Asakura – Akemi Nakagami
- Asuka Ono – Risa Shimazu
- Hisako Manda – Yoshimi Tachi
- Tetsushi Tanaka – Kai Sudo
- Masatō Ibu – Kurodo Goi

== Reception ==
Ed Chavez of Otaku USA called the series a "manga reader's manga" due to the lack of common tropes such as moe or fan service, and its realism-influenced art. Chavez found the characters and visual presentation to challenge him, with the protagonist's duality making him come back to read more. However, referring to the poor sales of Naoki Urasawa's Monster, he doubted that the American market was "interested in dramas of this caliber".

The manga was part of the selection list for "Best Manga Series 2010" at the 18th Anime & Manga Grand Prix.
