= Natsume & Natsume =

Japanese manga series

- First wideban volume cover

なつめとなつめ (Natsume to Natsume)
- Genre: Romantic comedy; Slice of life
- Manga
- Written by: Shunsuke Sorato
- Published by: Micro Magazine
- English publisher: NA: Omoi
- Magazine: Comic Elmo
- Original run: June 30, 2020 – April 22, 2025
- Volumes: 10
- Manga

Natsume & Natsume: more Perfume
- Written by: Shunsuke Sorato
- Published by: Micro Magazine
- English publisher: NA: Omoi
- Magazine: Comic Elmo
- Original run: July 29, 2025 – present
- Volumes: 2

Natsume & Natsume (Japanese: なつめとなつめ, Hepburn: Natsume to Natsume) is a Japanese manga series written and illustrated by Shunsuke Sorato. It was serialized on the Pixiv Comic website under Micro Magazine's Comic Elmo label from June 2020 to April 2025, with its chapters collected in eight volumes. A sequel, titled Natsume & Natsume: more Perfume, began serialization on the same website in July 2025.

== Synopsis ==
Natsume Shiranui is a high school student who scares people off due to his appearance; due to this his childhood friend, the attractive Natsume Minazuki, has to come in and protect Natsume from harm. He strives to be like her and one day, become her hero too.

== Characters ==
Natsume Shiranui (不知火棗, Shiranui Natsume)
Voiced by: Yūichirō Umehara (voice comic)
Natsume Minazuki (水無月夏目, Minazuki Natsume)
Voiced by: Azumi Waki (voice comic)

== Media ==
=== Manga ===
Written and illustrated by Shunsuke Sorato, Natsume & Natsume was serialized on the Pixiv Comic website under Micro Magazine's Comic Elmo label from June 30, 2020, to April 22, 2025. Its chapters were compiled into ten tankōbon volumes released from December 10, 2020, to May 10, 2025.

During their panel at Anime NYC 2022, KiraKira Media announced that they had licensed the series and added it to their Azuki manga service on December 2, 2022. During their panel at Anime Expo 2023, KiraKira Media announced that they would begin releasing ebook volumes of the series on August 25, 2023.

A sequel, titled Natsume & Natsume: more Perfume, began serialization on the same website on July 29, 2025. The sequel's chapters have been collected into two tankōbon volumes as of September 2026. During their panel at Anime Expo 2026, KiraKira Media announced that they had also licensed the sequel and will add it to their Omoi manga service in the near future.

==== Volumes ====
No.	Original release date	Original ISBN	North American release date	North American ISBN
1	December 10, 2020	978-4-86716-091-6	August 25, 2023	978-1-96018-607-2
1. "My Hero"; 2. "A Day in My Life"; 3. "The Cat, the Boy, and I"; 4. "A Hero's Smile"; 5. "Studying and I"; 6. "The Cheer Squad and I"; 7. "My Classmate"; 8. "Summer and I"; Bonus: Special collaboration with The Yakuza's Guide to Babysitting; Bonus: "My Childhood Friend"
2	April 9, 2021	978-4-86716-127-2	September 22, 2023	978-1-96018-608-9
9. "The Captain of the Cheer Squad and I"; 10. "Shopping and I"; 11. "The Beach and I"; 12. "Captain Yakusa and I"; Bonus: "My Other Grandmother"
3	September 10, 2021	978-4-86716-181-4	October 20, 2023	978-1-96018-609-6
13. "Gum Day"; 14. "The Naming and I"; 15. "A Mystery and I"; 16. "My Resolution"; 17. "The Sports Festival and I"; 18. "The Championship Flag and I"; Bonus
4	January 12, 2022	978-4-86716-230-9	February 13, 2024	978-1-96018-620-1
19. "My Hero"; 20. "Karaoke and I"; 21. "The Class Trip and I"; 19.5. "A Marvelous Smile"; 22. "The Skytree and I"; 23. "Mouseland and I"; 24. "Natsume and I"; Bonus: "Natsume's Piercings"
5	July 11, 2022	978-4-86716-313-9	April 17, 2024	978-1-96018-621-8
25. "Natsume and Iroha"; 26. "Memories and I"; Intermission 1: "The Real Demon"; Intermission 2: "Wish I Was There"; 27. "Me and Senpai"; 28. "Natsume and Meowboy"; 29. "Haruki Kitakado"; Bonus: "Mayumi and Natsume"
6	January 11, 2023	978-4-86716-380-1	July 26, 2024	978-1-96018-622-5
30. "A Hero and a Heroine"; 31. "Fantastic Friends"; 32. "I Will, I Will, I Absolutely Will!"; 33. "Utterly Cute and Wunderbar"; 34. "The Bracelets"; Bonus: "A Little Love"
7	August 10, 2023	978-4-86716-455-6	December 17, 2024	978-1-96018-623-2
35. "Keep Moving Ahead"; 36. "Me and Senpai"; 37. "I Don't See a Future Like That"; 38. "The Great Valentine's Day Plan"; 39. "Then from Whom?"; Bonus: "Little Red Riding Hood and the Nice Wolf"
8	February 13, 2024	978-4-86716-531-7	December 15, 2025	978-1-96018-624-9
40. "Thoughts"; 41. "A Girl's Thoughts Laid Bare..."; 42. "A Small Ask"; 43. "A Hero Complex"; Another Story: K&A 01. "A Bud Yet to Bloom"
9	October 10, 2024	978-4-86716-641-3	May 7, 2026	978-1-96018-625-6
44. "The New First Years"; 45. "Wavering"; 46. "Future Siblings"; 47. "Our Roles at the Culture Festival"; Another Story with K&A 02. "Her Flushed Cheeks"; Another Story with K&A 03. "Kusakabe Evolution"; Another Story with K&A 04. "I Want to Call You by Your Name Too"
10	May 10, 2025	978-4-86716-755-7	June 4, 2026	978-1-96018-640-9
48. "So I Can Face You"; 49. "Conscious of Love"; 50. "Timing"; 51. "The Last Page"; 52. "The First Page"; Bonus: "Exclusive Extra"

==== Natsume & Natsume: more Perfume ====
No.	Original release date	Original ISBN	North American release date	North American ISBN
1	February 20, 2026	978-4-86716-912-4	—	—
2	September 10, 2026	978-4-82500-034-6	—	—

=== Other ===
In commemoration of the release of the series' fifth volume on July 11, 2022, a voice comic adaptation was uploaded to the Micro Magazine YouTube channel that same day. The voice comic featured performances from Yūichirō Umehara and Azumi Waki.
