= Hikaru in the Light! =

Japanese manga series

- First tankōbon volume cover, featuring Hikaru Ogino

ひかるイン・ザ・ライト！ (Hikaru in za Raito!)
- Genre: Comedy-drama; Slice of life
- Manga
- Written by: Mai Matsuda
- Published by: Futabasha
- English publisher: NA: Azuki (digital); Scholastic (print)
- Imprint: Action Comics
- Magazine: Manga Action
- Original run: May 1, 2021 – August 2, 2022
- Volumes: 4
- icon

Hikaru in the Light! (Japanese: ひかるイン・ザ・ライト！, Hepburn: Hikaru in za Raito!) is a Japanese manga series written and illustrated by Mai Matsuda. It was serialized in Futabasha's seinen manga magazine Manga Action from May 2021 to August 2022, with its chapters collected in four tankōbon volumes.

== Plot ==
Hikaru Ogino is a fourteen-year-old girl who sings oldies while mopping the floors of her grandfather's bathhouse. She is persuaded by her friend, a former idol named Ran Nishikawa, to audition for a demanding idol survival camp. She enters the intensely competitive program, which is designed to identify new musical talent through a series of challenging evaluations. In this rigorous environment, Hikaru must quickly adapt to professional training while facing accomplished rivals, a process that tests her innate talent and personal determination.

== Publication ==
Written and illustrated by Mai Matsuda, Hikaru in the Light! was serialized in Futabasha's seinen manga magazine Manga Action from May 1, 2021, to August 2, 2022. Futabasha collected its chapters in four tankōbon volumes, released from September 28, 2021, to September 28, 2022.

The manga has been licensed in English by KiraKira's digital manga service Azuki and started publishing the series on June 13, 2022. In August 2024, Azuki announced a partnership with Scholastic's imprint Graphix to release the series in print starting in March 2025.

=== Volumes ===
No.	Original release date	Original ISBN	English release date	English ISBN
1	September 28, 2021	978-4-575-85643-9	March 4, 2025	978-1-5461-4098-6
2	February 28, 2022	978-4-575-85695-8	November 4, 2025	978-1-5461-4101-3
3	June 28, 2022	978-4-575-85729-0	March 3, 2026	978-1-5461-4105-1
4	September 28, 2022	978-4-575-85765-8	July 7, 2026	978-1-5461-4107-5

== Reception ==
The series was nominated at the Japan Society and Anime NYC's second American Manga Awards for Best New Manga in 2025. The series was included in the American Library Association's 2025 Best Fiction Graphic Novels for Middle Readers.

== See also ==
- Walking Home with You, another manga series by the same author
