= Maestro (manga) =

Japanese manga series

マエストロ (Maesutoro)
- Genre: Music, slice of life
- Manga
- Written by: Akira Sasō
- Published by: Futabasha
- Magazine: Manga Action; Futabasha Web Magazine (website)
- Original run: 2003 – 2007
- Volumes: 3
- Live-action film

Maestro! マエストロ!
- Directed by: Shōtarō Kobayashi
- Written by: Satoko Okudera
- Released: January 31, 2015

Maestro (マエストロ, Maesutoro) is a Japanese music slice of life seinen manga series written and illustrated by Akira Sasō. It was published by Futabasha, with serialization from 2003 to 2007, first on the manga magazine Manga Action and later on the website Futabasha Web Magazine. It was compiled in three volumes published between 2004 and 2008. It was adapted into a live action drama film titled Maestro!, directed by Shōtarō Kobayashi and released on January 31, 2015.

== Characters ==
- Tendō (Toshiyuki Nishida)
- Kōsaka (Tori Matsuzaka)
- (miwa)

== Volumes ==
- 1 (July 17, 2004)
- 2 (January 27, 2007)
- 3 (March 28, 2008)

== Reception ==
It won an Excellence Prize in the Manga Division at the 12th Japan Media Arts Awards. It was also nominated for the 13th Tezuka Osamu Cultural Prize.
