= Manga Action =

Japanese manga magazine

- Categories: Seinen manga
- Frequency: Weekly (until 2003); Bi-weekly (since 2003)
- First issue: July 7, 1967
- Company: Futabasha
- Country: Japan
- Language: Japanese
- Website: Official site

Manga Action (Japanese: 漫画アクション, Hepburn: Manga Akushon) is a Japanese seinen manga magazine published by Futabasha. It is currently published twice a month, on the first and third Thursday. The magazine was originally formed as Weekly Manga Action (WEEKLY漫画アクション) and began publishing weekly from July 7, 1967. It is considered the first true seinen magazine. In 2003 it changed to its current publishing format and dropped the Weekly part of its name to reflect its new schedule.

Circulation numbers between October 2009 and September 2010 was 200,000.

== Manga titles ==
=== Currently serialized ===
Listed chronologically.

- Koroshiya-san: The Hired Gun (since 2004, Tamachiku)
- Suzuki-sensei (since 2005, Kenji Taketomi)
- Even If You Don't Do It (since 2017, Haru Haruno)
- Shima-san (since 2020, Yōbundō Kawano)
- My Dear Detective: Mitsuko's Case Files (since 2021, Natsumi Ito)
- Outsider Paradise (since 2023, Rin Suzukawa)
- Walking Home with You (since 2023, Mai Matsuda)
- Miss Kobayashi's Dragon Maid (since 2024, Coolkyousinnjya)
- Not Me That Went Viral (since 2025, Sakuratori556)

=== Previously serialized ===
Listed by order of appearance.

- The New Dinosaurs: An Alternative Evolution (?-?, Takaaki Ogawa (artist), Dougal Dixon (writer))
- 009-1 (1967–1970, Shotaro Ishinomori)
- Lupin III (1967–1972, Monkey Punch)
- Lone Wolf and Cub (1970–1976, Kazuo Koike, Goseki Kojima)
- Short Peace (1976–1977, Katsuhiro Otomo)
- Ganbare!! Tabuchi-kun!! (1978–1979, Hisaichi Ishii)
- Kei no Seishun (1978–1980, Kazuo Koike, Goseki Kojima)
- Jarinko Chie (1978–1997, Etsumi Haruki)
- Bar Lemon Heart (1986–2021, Mitsutoshi Furuya)
- Judge (1989–1991, Fujihiko Hosono)
- All Purpose Cultural Cat Girl Nuku Nuku (1990–1991, Yuzo Takada)
- Crayon Shin-chan (1990–2000, Yoshito Usui)
- Acacia no Michi (1995, Yōko Kondō)
- Old Boy (1996–1998, Garon Tsuchiya & Nobuaki Minegishi)
- Shiawase no Jikan (1997–2001, Yasuyuki Kunitomo)
  - Shin Shiawase no Jikan (2005–2014, Yasuyumi Kunitomo)
- Shamo (1998–2007, Izo Hashimoto & Akio Tanaka)
- High School Girls (2001–2004, Towa Oshima)
- Cutie Honey Tennyo Densetsu (2001–2003, Go Nagai)
- Sky Hawk (2002, Jiro Taniguchi)
- Town of Evening Calm, Country of Cherry Blossoms (2003, Fumiyo Kōno)
- Maestro (2003–2007, Akira Sasō)
- Kodomo no Kodomo (2004, Akira Sasō)
- 17-sai. (2004–2005, (story by Seiji Fujii and art by Yōji Kamata)
- Ochiken (2005–2008, Yoshio Kawashima)
- Ekiben Hitoritabi (since 2006–2011, Jun Hayase (art & story), Kan Sakurai (editor))
- Ninja Papa (2006–2009, Yasuhito Yamamoto)
- In This Corner of the World (2006–2009, Fumiyo Kōno)
- Hinotama Love (2006–2007, Maya Koikeda)
- Gokudō Meshi (2006–2013, Shigeru Tsuchiyama)
- My Pure Lady: Onegai Suppleman (2006–2015, Kaoru Hazuki (artist), Chinatsu Tomisawa (creator))
- Uchi no Tsumatte Dō Deshō? (2007–2015, Shigeyuki Fukumitsu)
- Crime and Punishment: A Falsified Romance (January 23, 2007 – March 15, 2011, Naoyuki Ochiai)
- Nōnai Kakutō Akiba Shoot (since 2008–2009, Shingo Yamada)
- Porno Graffiti (2008–2010, Chinatsu Tomisawa)
- Samayoi Zakura (2008, Mamora Gōda)
- Sensei no Kaban (2008, Jiro Taniguchi (artist), Hiromi Kawakami (creator))
- Mitsubachi no Kiss (2008–2009, Tōru Izu)
- Stargazing Dog (August 5, 2008 – February 3, 2009, Takashi Murakami)
- Drifting Net Cafe (February 28, 2009 – June 28, 2011, Shūzō Oshimi)
- Fujiyama-san wa Shishunki (November 2012 - December 2015, Makoto Ojiro)
- Inside Mari (March 2012 - September 2016, Shūzō Oshimi)
- Tomodachi × Monster (June 2014 – 27 June 2015, Yoshihiko Inui)
- Hikaru in the Light! (May 2021 – August 2022, Mai Matsuda)
