= Kei no Seishun =

Japanese manga series

- First tankōbon volume cover

ケイの凄春
- Genre: Historical drama
- Manga
- Written by: Kazuo Koike
- Illustrated by: Goseki Kojima
- Published by: Futabasha; Koike Shoin (print)
- Magazine: Weekly Manga Action
- Original run: April 13, 1978 – December 18, 1980
- Volumes: 14

Kei no Seishun (Japanese: ケイの凄春) is a Japanese manga series written by Kazuo Koike and illustrated by Goseki Kojima. It was serialized in Futabasha's Seinen manga magazine Weekly Manga Action from April 1978 to December 1980, with its chapters collected in fourteen tankōbon volumes.

== Publication ==
Written by Kazuo Koike and illustrated by Goseki Kojima, Kei no Seishun was serialized in Futabasha's Seinen manga magazine Weekly Manga Action from April 13, 1978, to December 18, 1980. Futabasha collected its chapters in fourteen tankōbon volumes, published from November 1978 to March 1981.

Futabasha republished the series in ten aizōban volumes from April to August 1989. Koike Shoin published the series fourteen volumes in bunkoban from September 1993 to May 1995, and republished it in a new edition from May to December 2013, in ten volumes.
