= Akira Sasō =

Japanese manga artist and educator (born 1961)

Akira Sasō (Japanese: さそう あきら, Hepburn: Sasō Akira; born 1961) is a Japanese manga artist and educator. He has won a Tezuka Osamu Cultural Prize and two Japan Media Arts Awards, the latter for his manga Shindō (1997–98) and Maestro (2003–07).

== Biography ==
Sasō was born in Takarazuka, Hyōgo, Japan, in 1961. He completed his secondary education at Ikeda Senior High School in Osaka, then attended the Faculty of Literature at Waseda University, graduating in 1984. That year he made his debut in manga with Shiroi shiroi natsu yanen, which was published in seinen oriented Young Magazine in 1984. By the late 1990s he had finished such works as Busy Love (Ai ga isogashii) and There is No Tomorrow for Us (Oretachi ni Asu wa Naissu).

Between 1997 and 1998 Sasō wrote Shindō (The Prodigy), which was published in Manga Action in four volumes. It follow Uta, a young musical prodigy who rejects her gifts in her grief over her father's disappearance. For this manga, Sasō received the 3rd Tezuka Osamu Cultural Prize, as well as a Japan Media Arts Award for Excellence. Receiving the latter award, Sasō stated that he had attempted to convey sound through his narrative. The Japan Media Arts Council stated that the manga's "delicate illustrations express the tempestuous emotions of the young girl and boy, while also creating a rhythm for the piano music". A film version of the manga, directed by Koji Hagiuda and starring Riko Narumi and Kenichi Matsuyama, was released in 2007.

In early 2004 Sasō began publishing Kodomo no Kodomo (Child's Child) in Manga Action. The manga's three volumes followed Haruna, an 11-year-old fifth grader who became pregnant after having sex with her childhood friend Hiroyuki. In 2008 the story was adapted to film, with Haruna Amari in the lead role.

Sasō's Maestro (マエストロ) won a Japan Media Arts Award for Excellence in 2008, and was nominated for the Tezuka Osamu Cultural Prize. Published in Futabasha's Manga Action, and later its website, from 2003 to 2007, the comic follows an unorthodox conductor named Tendō who leads an orchestra and restores its members confidence. A film adaptation, directed by Shōtarō Kobayashi and starring Tori Matsuzaka and Toshiyuki Nishida, is scheduled for 2015.

From February to August 2008, Sasō published an adaptation of Yōjirō Takita's film Departures, serialized in twelve instalments in the bi-weekly Big Comic Superior. He agreed to take on the adaptation as he was impressed by Kundō Koyama's script. Sasō had the opportunity to view the film before beginning the adaptation, and came to feel that a too-literal adaptation would not be appropriate. He made changes to the settings and physical appearances of the characters, and increased the focus on the role of music in the story. Later in 2008 the serial was compiled in a 280-page volume released by Shogakukan.

Sasō has written a variety of manga, including Toto's World (about a child who is unable to speak) and Fujisan. Toto's World was adapted to film by NHK. In June 2014 he was one of twenty artists to collaborate on a special Godzilla manga, published by Big Comic Original in commemoration of the 60th anniversary of the title character. Sasō became a professor at the Department of Manga at Kyoto Seika University in 2006.

== Works cited ==
- 第3回 マンガ優秀賞 さそうあきら 『神童』 [3rd Tezuka Osamu Cultural Prize]. Asahi Shimbun (in Japanese). Archived from the original on 25 May 2013.
- "さそう あきら" [Akira Sasō] (in Japanese). Kyoto Seika University. Archived from the original on 10 October 2014.
- ""ゴジラ漫画"を高橋留美子・北見けんいち・吉田戦車ら人気作家20名が描き下ろし！" [Twenty Popular Writers Collaborate on Godzilla Manga!]. MSN News (in Japanese). 22 July 2014. Archived from the original on 28 July 2014.
- "2008 Japan Media Arts Festival Awards" (in Japanese). Japan Media Arts Plaza, Agency for Cultural Affairs. Archived from the original on 24 August 2011.
- "Kodomo no Kodomo Manga's Live-Action Film in September". Anime News Network. 19 June 2008. Archived from the original on 10 September 2014.
- Okuribito. WorldCat. OCLC 271435675.
- "Shindo". Japan Media Arts Plaza, Agency for Cultural Affairs. Archived from the original on 5 September 2010.
- Schilling, Mark (27 April 2007). "Shindo". The Japan Times. Archived from the original on 13 April 2012.
- Takahashi, Masahiro (10 September 2008). 映画で企画、漫画を作る 「コミカライズ」が隆盛 [In the Movies, Planning for Comics, Komikaraizu is Flourishing]. Asahi Shimbun (in Japanese).
- "Tori Matsuzaka Stars in Film of Akira Saso's Maestro Manga". Anime News Network. 30 January 2014. Archived from the original on 6 March 2014.
