= Miwako =

- Gender: Female

Origin
- Origin: Japanese
- Meaning: Different meanings depending on the kanji used

Miwako (written: 美和子, 三和子 or 実和子) is a feminine Japanese given name. Notable people with the name include:

- Miwako Date (伊達 美和子; born 1971), Japanese businesswoman, and the president and CEO
- Miwako Doi (土井 美和子), Japanese electrical engineer
- Miwako Ichikawa (市川 実和子; born 1976), Japanese actress
- Miwako Kakei (筧 美和子; born 1994), Japanese model, actress and television personality
- Miwako Kobayashi (小林 美和子; born 1952), Japanese swimmer
- Miwako Motoyoshi (元好 三和子; born 1960), Japanese synchronized swimmer
- Miwako Okuda (奥田 美和子; born 1982), Japanese singer
- Miwako Okamura (岡村 美和子; born 1963), Japanese actress
- Miwako Shimada (嶋田 美和子; born 1972), Japanese fencer
- Miwako Wagatsuma (我妻 三輪子; born 1991), Japanese former idol of idol group 9nine
- Miwako Yamanaka (山中 美和子; born 1978), Japanese long-distance runner
