= List of Fairy Tail volumes =

The cover of the first volume of Fairy Tail as published by Kodansha on December 15, 2006, in Japan

Fairy Tail is a Japanese shōnen manga series written and illustrated by Hiro Mashima. The first chapter premiered in Kodansha's Weekly Shōnen Magazine on August 2, 2006, and it was serialized weekly until July 26, 2017. Fairy Tail follows the adventures of Natsu Dragneel, a teenage wizard (魔導士, madōshi) (Note: According to the Fairy Tail Volume 2 Del Rey edition Translation Notes, General Notes, Wizard: So this translation has taken that as its inspiration and translated the word madôshi as "wizard". But madôshi's meaning is similar to certain Japanese words that have been borrowed by the English language, such as judo (the soft way) and kendo (the way of the sword). Madô is the way of magic, and madôshi are those who follow the way of magic. So although the word "wizard" is used in the original dialogue, a Japanese reader would be likely to think not of traditional Western wizards such as Merlin or Gandalf, but of martial artists.) who is a member of the popular wizards' guild Fairy Tail, as he searches for the dragon Igneel. On their journey, they are tasked with completing missions requested by people and collect money for rewards, such as hunting monsters and fighting illegal guilds called dark guilds.

The 545 chapters were collected into 63 tankōbon volumes between December 15, 2006, and December 26, 2017. The manga was adapted into an anime series by A-1 Pictures and Satelight, and aired on TV Tokyo from October 12, 2009, to March 30, 2013. On July 20, 2017, Mashima confirmed on Twitter that the final season of Fairy Tail will air in 2018. The series is licensed for regional language releases by Star Comics in Italy, Pika in France and Norma Editorial in Spain.

In North America, Kodansha USA, under the Kodansha Comics imprint, publishes its English language adaptation of the series, chapterwise in Crunchyroll Manga since October 2013. The tankōbon were first published by Del Rey Manga beginning on March 25, 2008, until Kodansha USA took over with the thirteenth volume in May 2011, reprinting the earlier 12 volumes under their name. At the New York Comic Con in October 2012, Kodansha announced an accelerated tankōbon release schedule after the 24th volume in March 2013. Their English release concluded with the 63rd volume on January 23, 2018.

== Volume list ==
=== Volumes 1–15 ===
| No. | Original release date | Original ISBN | North American release date | North American ISBN |
|---|---|---|---|---|
| 1 | December 15, 2006 | 978-4-06-363771-7 | March 25, 2008 | 978-0-345-50133-2 |
| 2 | January 17, 2007 | 978-4-06-363782-3 | March 25, 2008 | 978-0-345-50330-5 |
| 3 | March 16, 2007 | 978-4-06-363810-3 | June 24, 2008 | 978-0-345-50556-9 |
| 4 | May 17, 2007 | 978-4-06-363832-5 | September 16, 2008 | 978-0-345-50557-6 |
| 5 | July 17, 2007 | 978-4-06-363857-8 | January 27, 2009 | 978-0-345-50558-3 |
| 6 | September 14, 2007 | 978-4-06-363890-5 | April 28, 2009 | 978-0-345-50681-8 |
| 7 | November 16, 2007 | 978-4-06-363914-8 | July 7, 2009 | 978-0-345-51039-6 |
| 8 | January 17, 2008 | 978-4-06-363940-7 | October 27, 2009 | 978-0-345-51040-2 |
| 9 | March 17, 2008 | 978-4-06-363965-0 | December 29, 2009 | 978-0-345-51233-8 |
| 10 | May 16, 2008 | 978-4-06-363986-5 | March 23, 2010 | 978-0-345-51457-8 |
| 11 | August 12, 2008 | 978-4-06-384023-0 | June 22, 2010 | 978-0-345-51992-4 |
| 12 | October 17, 2008 | 978-4-06-384050-6 | September 28, 2010 | 978-0-345-51993-1 |
| 13 | December 17, 2008 | 978-4-06-384075-9 | May 10, 2011 | 978-1-935429-32-6 |
| 14 | March 17, 2009 | 978-4-06-384098-8 | July 12, 2011 | 978-1-935429-33-3 |
| 15 | May 15, 2009 | 978-4-06-384136-7 | September 27, 2011 | 978-1-935429-34-0 |

=== Volumes 16–30 ===
| No. | Original release date | Original ISBN | North American release date | North American ISBN |
|---|---|---|---|---|
| 16 | July 17, 2009 | 978-4-06-384158-9 | November 8, 2011 | 978-1-935429-35-7 |
| 17 | September 17, 2009 | 978-4-06-384185-5 | January 24, 2012 | 978-1-61262-054-1 |
| 18 | November 17, 2009 | 978-4-06-384211-1 | March 6, 2012 | 978-1-61262-055-8 |
| 19 | January 15, 2010 | 978-4-06-384233-3 | May 29, 2012 | 978-1-61262-056-5 |
| 20 | March 17, 2010 | 978-4-06-384266-1 | July 10, 2012 | 978-1-61262-057-2 |
| 21 | May 17, 2010 | 978-4-06-384296-8 | September 25, 2012 | 978-1-61262-058-9 |
| 22 | August 17, 2010 | 978-4-06-384346-0 | November 27, 2012 | 978-1-61262-059-6 |
| 23 | October 15, 2010 | 978-4-06-384379-8 | January 29, 2013 | 978-1-61262-060-2 |
| 24 | December 17, 2010 | 978-4-06-384416-0 | March 26, 2013 | 978-1-61262-266-8 |
| 25 | February 17, 2011 | 978-4-06-384442-9 | April 23, 2013 | 978-1-61262-267-5 |
| 26 | April 15, 2011 | 978-4-06-384473-3 | May 28, 2013 | 978-1-61262-268-2 |
| 27 | June 17, 2011 | 978-4-06-384502-0 | June 25, 2013 | 978-1-61262-269-9 |
| 28 | August 17, 2011 | 978-4-06-384533-4 | July 30, 2013 | 978-1-61262-270-5 |
| 29 | October 17, 2011 | 978-4-06-384563-1 | August 27, 2013 | 978-1-61262-406-8 |
| 30 | December 16, 2011 | 978-4-06-384597-6 | September 24, 2013 | 978-1-61262-407-5 |

=== Volumes 31–45 ===
| No. | Original release date | Original ISBN | North American release date | North American ISBN |
|---|---|---|---|---|
| 31 | February 17, 2012 | 978-4-06-384628-7 | October 29, 2013 | 978-1-61262-408-2 |
| 32 | April 17, 2012 | 978-4-06-384654-6 | November 19, 2013 | 978-1-61262-409-9 |
| 33 | June 15, 2012 | 978-4-06-384686-7 | December 3, 2013 | 978-1-61262-410-5 |
| 34 | August 17, 2012 | 978-4-06-384719-2 | January 7, 2014 | 978-1-61262-411-2 |
| 35 | November 16, 2012 | 978-4-06-384765-9 | February 25, 2014 | 978-1-61262-412-9 |
| 36 | February 15, 2013 | 978-4-06-384810-6 | March 25, 2014 | 978-1-61262-432-7 |
| 37 | April 17, 2013 | 978-4-06-384845-8 | April 15, 2014 | 978-1-61262-433-4 |
| 38 | June 17, 2013 | 978-4-06-384876-2 | May 13, 2014 | 978-1-61262-434-1 |
| 39 | August 16, 2013 | 978-4-06-394908-7 | June 4, 2014 | 978-1-61262-435-8 |
| 40 | October 17, 2013 | 978-4-06-394941-4 | July 15, 2014 | 978-1-61262-417-4 |
| 41 | December 17, 2013 | 978-4-06-394982-7 | August 12, 2014 | 978-1-61262-437-2 |
| 42 | March 17, 2014 | 978-4-06-395009-0 | September 30, 2014 | 978-1-61262-561-4 |
| 43 | May 16, 2014 | 978-4-06-395077-9 | October 28, 2014 | 978-1-61262-562-1 |
| 44 | July 17, 2014 | 978-4-06-395124-0 | November 25, 2014 | 978-1-61262-563-8 |
| 45 | September 17, 2014 | 978-4-06-395186-8 | December 30, 2014 | 978-1-61262-564-5 |

=== Volumes 46–63 ===
| No. | Original release date | Original ISBN | North American release date | North American ISBN |
|---|---|---|---|---|
| 46 | November 17, 2014 | 978-4-06-395241-4 | January 27, 2015 | 978-1-61262-797-7 |
| 47 | January 16, 2015 | 978-4-06-395-287-2 | March 31, 2015 | 978-1-61262-798-4 |
| 48 | March 17, 2015 | 978-4-06-395343-5 | May 26, 2015 | 978-1-61262-819-6 |
| 49 | May 15, 2015 | 978-4-06-395406-7 | July 28, 2015 | 978-1-61262-985-8 |
| 50 | July 17, 2015 | 978-4-06-395435-7 | September 29, 2015 | 978-1-61262-986-5 |
| 51 | September 17, 2015 | 978-4-06-395489-0 | November 24, 2015 | 978-1-63236-114-1 |
| 52 | November 17, 2015 | 978-4-06-395538-5 | January 26, 2016 | 978-1-63236-115-8 |
| 53 | January 15, 2016 | 978-4-06-395577-4 | April 12, 2016 | 978-1-63236-126-4 |
| 54 | March 17, 2016 | 978-4-06-395626-9 | June 21, 2016 | 978-1-63236-215-5 |
| 55 | May 17, 2016 | 978-4-06-395675-7 | August 9, 2016 | 978-1-63236-262-9 |
| 56 | July 15, 2016 | 978-4-06-395715-0 | September 27, 2016 | 978-1-63236-290-2 |
| 57 | September 16, 2016 | 978-4-06-395761-7 | November 29, 2016 | 978-1-63236-291-9 |
| 58 | November 17, 2016 | 978-4-06-395804-1 | February 28, 2017 | 978-1-63236-334-3 |
| 59 | December 16, 2016 | 978-4-06-395831-7 | March 28, 2017 | 978-1-63236-335-0 |
| 60 | March 17, 2017 | 978-4-06-395897-3 | May 30, 2017 | 978-1-63236-336-7 |
| 61 | May 17, 2017 | 978-4-06-395945-1 | July 25, 2017 | 978-1-63236-430-2 |
| 62 | September 15, 2017 | 978-4-06-510034-9 | November 14, 2017 | 978-1-63236-475-3 |
| 63 | November 17, 2017 | 978-4-06-510390-6 | January 23, 2018 | 978-1-63236-476-0 |

== Spin-offs ==
=== Fairy Tail: Ice Trail ===
Fairy Tail: Ice Trail, titled Tale of Fairy Tail: Ice Trail (TALE OF FAIRY TAIL ICE TRAIL ～氷の軌跡～, Teiru obu Fearī Teiru: Aisu Toreiru – Kōri no Kiseki) in Japan, is a prequel spin-off by Yūsuke Shirato that focuses on a young version of the character Gray Fullbuster on his adventures leading to his membership in Fairy Tail. It was published simultaneously with Fairy Tail Zero in Monthly Fairy Tail Magazine from July 17, 2014, through July 17, 2015, and was collected into two tankōbon volumes on September 17, 2015, in Japan, and between December 19, 2015, and June 28, 2016, in North America.

| No. | Original release date | Original ISBN | North American release date | North American ISBN |
|---|---|---|---|---|
| 1 | September 17, 2015 | 978-4-06-395502-6 | December 29, 2015 | 978-1-63236-283-4 |
1. "And That Boy's Name Is..." (その少年の名は, Sono Shōnen no Na wa); 2. "First Battle"; 3. "Black Vox"; 4. "Fleeting Glimpses" (垣間見えるモノ, Kaima Mieru Mono); 5. "Meetings and Memories" (邂逅と回想, Kaikō to Kaisō); 6. "River"; 7. "And Its Name Is..." (その場所の名は, Sono Bashō no Na wa); Omake. "Another Trail: Friends in Snowy Places" (another trail: 雪原の仲間たち, Setsugen no Nakama-tachi)
| 2 | September 17, 2015 | 978-4-06-395503-3 | June 28, 2016 | 978-1-63236-285-8 |
8. "Sunny with Occasional Showers" (晴れ時々雨, Hare Tokidoki Ame); 9. "In the Train"; 10. "A Forest Adventure" (森での出来事, Mori de no Dekigoto); 11. "Closer"; 12. "True Identity" (正体, Shōtai); 13. "Start Again"; Omake. "Another Trail: Spring, When Snow Blooms" (another trail: 雪咲く春, Yukisaku Haru)

=== Fairy Tail Blue Mistral ===
Fairy Tail Blue Mistral (FAIRY TAIL ブルー・ミストラル, Fearī Teiru Burū Misutoraru) is a spin-off by Rui Watanabe that focuses on the character Wendy Marvell and her early adventures within Fairy Tail. It ran in Kodansha's shōjo manga magazine Nakayoshi from August 2, 2014, to December 1, 2015, with the chapters collected into four tankōbon volumes between January 16, 2015, and January 15, 2016, in Japan, and from August 25, 2015, through August 7, 2018, in North America.

| No. | Original release date | Original ISBN | North American release date | North American ISBN |
|---|---|---|---|---|
| 1 | January 16, 2015 | 978-4-06-364456-2 | August 25, 2015 | 978-1-63236-133-2 |
1. "Departure" (出発, Shuppatsu); 2. "Dragon Treasure" (竜の宝, Ryū no Takara); 3. "The Ghost's Identity" (亡霊の正体, Bōrei no Shōtai); 4. "Night Butterfly" (夜に舞う蝶, Yoru ni Mau Chō)
| 2 | May 15, 2015 | 978-4-06-364470-8 | February 16, 2016 | 978-1-63236-275-9 |
5. "Treasure from a Dragon" (竜からの宝物, Ryū kara no Hōmotsu); 6. "The Big Plan for Escape" (脱出大作戦, Dasshutsu Daisakusen); 7. "The Forest Wizard" (森の魔導士, Mori no Madōshi); 8. "True Strength" (ほんとうの強さ, Hontō no Tsuyosa); Omake. "Side Story: The Lost Ribbon" (番外編: 消えたリボン, Bangai-hen: Kieta Ribon)
| 3 | September 17, 2015 | 978-4-06-364485-2 | August 23, 2016 | 978-1-63236-318-3 |
9. "The Adventures of Wendell: Arrival at Aiya Village" (ウェンデルの冒険1 到着! アイアーの町, Wenderu no Bōken 1: Tōchaku! Aiā no Machi); 10. "The Adventures of Wendell: Where's Carla...?" (ウェンデルの冒険2 シャルルはどこ...?, Wenderu no Bōken 2: Sharuru wa Doko...?); 11. "The Adventures of Wendell: The Secret of the Treasure House" (ウェンデルの冒険3 宝物庫のヒミツ, Wenderu no Bōken 3: Hōmotsuko no Himitsu); 12. "The Adventures of Wendell: Viola and Sera" (ウェンデルの冒険4 ビオラとセラ, Wenderu no Bōken 4: Biora to Sera)
| 4 | January 15, 2016 | 978-4-06-364498-2 | August 7, 2018 | 978-1-63236-530-9 |
13. "The Angel's Adventure 1: The Angel's Descent" (天使の冒険1 舞い降りた天使, Tenshi no Bōken 1: Maiorita Tenshi); 14. "The Angel's Adventure 2: The Devil's Child" (天使の冒険2 悪魔の子, Tenshi no Bōken 2: Akuma no Ko); 15. "The Angel's Adventure 3: God's Wrath" (天使の冒険3 神さまの怒り, Tenshi no Bōken 3: Kami-sama no Ikari); 16. "The Angel's Adventure 4: Nothing Short of a Miracle" (天使の冒険4 まさに奇跡だ, Tenshi no Bōken 4: Masani Kiseki da)

=== Fairy Girls ===
Fairy Girls (stylized in all caps) is a spin-off by Boku that focuses on the series' primary female protagonists, which was released in Kodansha's Magazine Special from November 20, 2014, to August 20, 2016. The chapters were collected into four tankōbon volumes from May 15, 2015, through September 16, 2016, in Japan, and from November 10, 2015, through April 25, 2017, in North America.

| No. | Original release date | Original ISBN | North American release date | North American ISBN |
|---|---|---|---|---|
| 1 | May 15, 2015 | 978-4-06-395407-4 | November 10, 2015 | 978-1-63236-184-4 |
1. "Four Fairies" (4人の妖精, Yonin no Yōsei-tachi); 2. "Charge! Palace-ing • Bathing • Flying?!" (出撃! 王城・フロ・空中!, Shutsugeki! Ōjō, Furo, Kūchū!); 3. "A Grizzly Fight!" (激闘! クマったちゃん!, Gekitō! Kumatta-chan!); 4. "Teddy's Secret" ("クマさん"の秘密, "Kuma-san" no Himitsu); 5. "What a Wizard Is Prepared For" (魔導士の覚悟, Madōshi no Kakugo)
| 2 | November 17, 2015 | 978-4-06-395539-2 | April 26, 2016 | 978-1-63236-317-6 |
6. "Fairies Love Resorts?!" (妖精はリゾートがお好き!?, Yōsei wa Rizōto ga Osuki!?); 7. "Is This...a First for Wendy?!" (ウェンディの...初めて!?, Wendi no...Hajimete!?); 8. "With an Unbreakable Spirit..." (折れない心で..., Orenai Kokoro de...); 9. "Light That Pierces the Depths of the Heart" (心の奥に射す光, Kokoro no Oku ni Sasu Hikari); 10. "The Ultimate Girl Power" ("女子力"の極み, "Joshiryoku" no Kiwami)
| 3 | March 17, 2016 | 978-4-06-395627-6 | October 18, 2016 | 978-1-63236-332-9 |
11. "The Whereabouts of Great Service" ("おもてなし"の行方, "Omotenashi" no Yukue); 12. "Fairies vs. Mermaids" (妖精 vs. 人魚, Yōsei vs. Ningyo); 13. "Mermaid's Miscalculation" (人魚の誤算, Ningyo no Gosan); 14. "The Splendid 'Punishment'" (華麗なる"おしおき", Karei naru "Oshioki"); 15. "Save the Stray Angel!!" (はぐれそうな"天使"を救え!!, Hagure Sōna "Tenshi" o Sukue); 16. "The Smell of Truth?!" (真実の匂い!?, Shinjitsu no Nioi!?)
| 4 | September 16, 2016 | 978-4-06-395760-0 | April 25, 2017 | 978-1-63236-333-6 |
17. "Scoop Is a Dangerous Investigation" (スクープは危険な調べ, Sukūpu wa Kiken na Shirabe); 18. "Magic Smile" (笑顔の魔法, Egao no Mahō); 19. "Invisible Crime"; 20. "Fairies' Counterattack" (妖精たちの逆襲, Yōsei-tachi no Gyakushū); 21. "Fairy Girls"

=== Fairy Tail Side Stories ===
Fairy Tail Side Stories (FAIRY TAIL外伝, Fearī Teiru Gaiden) is a meta-series of spin-offs by Kyōta Shibano that launched in Kodansha's free weekly Magazine Pocket mobile app on July 30, 2015. Side Stories consists of three installments: Twin Dragons of Saber Tooth (剣咬の双竜, Kengami no Sōryū), focusing on Sting Eucliffe and Rogue Cheney, which ended on November 4; Rhodonite (ロードナイト, Rōdonaito), focusing on Gajeel Redfox, which ran from November 18, 2015, to March 30, 2016; and Lightning Gods (雷豪一閃, Raigō Issen), focusing on Laxus Dreyar, which ran from May 4 to September 14, concluding the series' run. Each series is collected into a single tankōbon, for a total of three volumes published between January 15 and November 17, 2016, in Japan, and between December 6, 2016, and October 23, 2018, in North America.

| No. | Title | Original release date | North American release date |
|---|---|---|---|
| 1 | Fairy Tail: Twin Dragons of Saber Tooth; Fearī Teiru Gaiden: Kengami no Sōryū (フェアリーテイル外伝 剣咬の双竜) | January 15, 2016; 978-4-06-395578-1 | December 6, 2016; 978-1-63236-359-6 |
1. "Melancholy Master" (マスターのゆううつ, Masutā no Yūutsu); 2. "The Ancient Magic Weapon" (古代魔法兵器, Kodai Mahō Heiki); 3. "Family" (家族, Kazoku); 4. "Nobody Can Stop It" (誰にも止められない, Dare ni mo Tomararenai); 5. "Broken Partnership" (コンビ解消!?, Konbi Kaishō!?); 6. "The Mystery of Rock Town" (石の街の謎, Ichi no Machi no Nazo); 7. "A Tiger's Cage" (虎の檻, Tora no Ori); 8. "The One Who Wants Dragon Power" (竜の力を欲す者, Ryū no Chikara o Horisu Mono); 9. "I Hate You, Miss" (お姉ちゃんは嫌い, Onee-chan wa Kirai); 10. "The Battle Between the Woman and the Girl" (女と女の子の戦い, Onna to Onna no Ko no Tatakai); 11. "A World of Overflowing Warmth" (満ち足りる世界, Michitariru Sekai); 12. "It Isn't Going to End Here" (このままじゃ終われない, Kono Mama ja Owarenai); 13. "Rock Dragon" (岩の竜, Iwa no Ryū); 14. "Strength" (ストレングス, Sutorengusu); 15. "Twin Dragons" (双竜, Sōryū); Omake. "Side Story: White Flower" (番外編: 白い花, Bangai-hen: Shiroi Hana)
| 2 | Fairy Tail: Rhodonite; Fearī Teiru Gaiden: Rōdonaito (フェアリーテイル外伝 ロードナイト) | May 17, 2016; 978-4-06-395676-4 | June 6, 2017; 978-1-63236-524-8 |
1. "Where Is Gajeel" (ガジルはどこだ, Gajiru wa Doko da); 2. "My Town" (オレの町だ, Ore no Machi da); 3. "The Meeting in Denish" (デニッシュの出会い, Denisshu no Deai); 4. "Illegal Magic Drug" (違法魔法薬物, Ihō Mahō Yakubutsu); 5. "The Road Knight" (夜道の騎士, Yomichi no Kishi); 6. "The Gajeel I Never Knew" (私の知らないガジル, Watashi no Shiranai Gajiru); 7. "Will You Just Shut Up" (うるせえよ おまえは, Urusee yo, Omae wa); 8. "His Fight" (彼の決闘, Kare no Kettō); 9. "Man Behind the Curtain" (黒幕, Kuromaku); 10. "Friend" (友, Tomo); 11. "Rhodonite" (ロードナイト, Rōdonaito); 12. "First Bout"; 13. "Slave Trade" (奴隷売り, Dorei Uri); 14. "The Infallible Counter-plan" (絶対の対策, Zettai no Taisaku); 15. "Effective Use" (有効活用, Yūkō Katsuyō); 16. "A Wish and a Prepared Soul" (覚悟という名の願い, Kakugo Toiu Na no Negai); 17. "A Place to Go Home To" (帰る場所, Kaeru Bashō); Omake. "Side Story: Intermission" (番外編: Intermission, Bangai-hen: Intermission)
| 3 | Fairy Tail: Lightning Gods; Fearī Teiru Gaiden: Raigō Issen (フェアリーテイル外伝 雷豪一閃) | November 17, 2016; 978-4-06-395805-8 | October 23, 2018; 978-1-63236-692-4 |
1. "Lightning Craves Power" (雷は強さを求める, Ikazuchi wa Tsuyosa o Motomeru); 2. "Rose-Colored Anguish" (薔薇色の憂鬱, Barairo no Yūutsu); 3. "The Maiden Quartet" (乙女四重奏(カルテット), Otome Karutetto); 4. "Lightning Magic" (雷の使い手, Ikazuchi no Tsukaite); 5. "No Encores" (アンコールはできない, Ankōru wa Dekinai); 6. "A Blue Toast" (青い祝杯, Aoi Shukuhai); 7. "A Specific Request" (指定依頼, Shitei Irai); 8. "A Mirror, a Reflection, and a Man" (鏡と反射とある男, Kagami to Hansha Toaru Otoko); 9. "The Tribe of the Vesper Blockade" (夕断の一族, Yūdan no Ichizoku); 10. "Duty" (義務, Gimu); 11. "Sunset Showdown" (暮れの戦い, Kure no Tatakai); 12. "Just Another Quest" (ただの依頼(クエスト)の一つだろう, Tada no Kuesuto no Hitotsu Darō); 13. "The God of Nightfall" (ヒグレノカミ, Higure no Kami); 14. "Deceit" (邪, Yokoshima); 15. "The Truth Revealed" (暴かれた真実, Abakareta Shinjitsu); 16. "The Raijin Tribe" (雷神衆, Raijinshū); 17. "Support" (背中, Senaka); 18. "Unwavering" (迷いなく, Mayoinaku); 19. "The End of the Story" (外伝の終わり, Gaiden no Owari)

=== Fairy Tail S ===
Fairy Tail S: Tales from Fairy Tail, simply titled Fairy Tail S (stylized in all caps) in Japan, is a collection of omake manga by Hiro Mashima created across the main series' run. Two tankōbon volumes were released in Japan on September 16, 2016, and in North America on October 24, 2017, and April 17, 2018.

| No. | Original release date | Original ISBN | English release date | English ISBN |
|---|---|---|---|---|
| 1 | September 16, 2016 | 978-4-06-395758-7 | October 24, 2017 | 978-1-63236-609-2 |
1. "Happy the Blue Cat" (あおネコハッピー, Ao Neko Happī); 2. "The Fairies' Booby Prizes" (妖精たちの罰ゲーム, Yōsei-tachi no Batsu Gēmu); 3. "Welcome Home, Frosch" (おかえり､ フロッシュ, Okaeri, Furosshu); 4. "413 Days"; 5. "That Woman, Erza" (その女､ エルザ!!, Sono Onna, Eruza!!); 6. "Natsu vs. Mavis" (ナツ vs. メイビス, Natsu vs. Meibisu); 7. "Fairy Tail of the Dead Meeeeeeeen"; 8. "A Merry, Fairy Christmas" (妖精たちのクリスマス, Yōsei-tachi no Kurisumasu); 9. "Special Mission: Beware of Guys Who Show a Keen Interest!" (特別依頼｡ 気になる彼に注意せよ!, Tokubetsu Irai. Kininaru Kare ni Chūi Seyo!)
| 2 | September 16, 2016 | 978-4-06-395759-4 | April 17, 2018 | 978-1-63236-610-8 |
1. "Gangsta Guys and Gangsta Girls" (ヤンキー君とやんキーちゃん, Yankī-kun to Yankī-chan); 2. "Welcome to Fairy Hills" (ようこそ フェアリーヒルズ!!, Yōkoso, Fearī Hiruzu!!); 3. "Rainbow Cherry Blossoms" (虹の桜, Niji no Sakura); 4. "Fairy Tail x Rave Master" (FAIRYTAIL × RAVE); 5. "Fairy Woman" (フェアリーウーマン, Fearī Ūman); 6. "Natsu and Asuka" (ナツとアスカ, Natsu to Asuka); 7. "Lucy and Migi" (ルーシィとミギー, Rūshii to Migī); 8. "Fairy Tail Stone Age"; 9. "Coca-Cola Collab Side-story" (Note: Chapter not included in English release) (Coca-Cola コラボ番外編, Coca-Cola Korabo Bangai-hen)

=== Fairy Tail: Happy's Heroic Adventure ===
Fairy Tail: Happy's Heroic Adventure, titled Fairy Tail: Happy Adventure (FAIRY TAIL ハッピーの大冒険, Fearī Teiru: Happī no Daibōken) in Japan, is a spin-off written and illustrated by Kenshirō Sakamoto that focuses on Happy becoming separated from Natsu Dragneel and trapped in a parallel universe inhabited by animals. It was first launched on Magazine Pocket on July 26, 2018, and ended publication on April 2, 2020. After its fourth tankōbon volume, which Sakamoto described as the end of the manga's "first part", the manga switched to exclusively digital publication for the remainder of its run.

| No. | Original release date | Original ISBN | English release date | English ISBN |
|---|---|---|---|---|
| 1 | December 7, 2018 | 978-4-06-514275-2 | September 17, 2019 (digital) | 978-1-64659-002-5 |
1. "Happy Goes to Another World?!" (ハッピー異世界へ!?, Happī Isekai e!?); 2. "Happy the Hero!" (ハッピー勇者になる!, Happī Yūsha ni Naru!); 3. "Luna the Fox" (キツネのルナ, Kitsune no Runa); 4. "Showdown with Dori Dorin (対決ドリドリン, Taiketsu Dori Dorin); 5. "The Real Luna" (ルナの正体, Runa no Shōtai); 6. "Smile Heart" (スマイルハート, Sumairu Hāto); 7. "The Strength to Change" (変われる強さ, Kawareru Tsuyosa); 8. "The Blue Warrior" (青の戦士, Ao no Senshi); 9. "The Heroes' Race Begins!" (勇者レース開催!, Yūsha Rēsu Kaisai!); 10. "What Makes a Hero" (勇者の資質, Yūsha no Shishitsu)
| 2 | February 15, 2019 | 978-4-06-514938-6 | October 29, 2019 (digital) | 978-1-64659-092-6 |
11. "The South Forest" (南の森, Minami no Mori); 12. "Happy vs. Agi" (ハッピー vs. アギ, Happī vs. Agi); 13. "Deep Into the Forest" (森の奥へ, Mori no Oku e); 14. "Tower in the Big Tree" (大樹の塔, Taiju no Tō); 15. "Machine" (キカイ, Kikai); 16. "With Swift Wings and Powerful Fists" (翼と拳で, Tsubasa to Kobushi de); 17. "A Girl's Voice Calls" (少女の呼び声, Shōjo no Yobi Koe); 18. "A New Friend" (新しい友達, Atarashii Tomodashi); 19. "Happy the Liar" (嘘つきハッピー, Usotsuki Happī); 20. "Luna's Past" (ルナの過去, Runa no Kako)
| 3 | April 17, 2019 | 978-4-06-516040-4 | November 26, 2019 (digital) | 978-1-64659-123-7 |
21. "The Big Four of Wild Town" (ワイルドタウンの四天王, Wairudo Taun no Shitennō); 22. "Because We're Friends" (友達だから, Tomodachi Dakara); 23. "The Animal Villagers' Resolve" (アニマール村の覚悟, Animāru Mura no Kakugo); 24. "Eleph vs. Tigre" (エレフ vs. ティーグル, Erefu vs. Tīguru); 25. "Three Against Three" (三対三, San tai San); 26. "The Fight Begins! Dori Dorin vs. Rhino" (決勝開始! ドリドリン vs. ライノ, Kettō Kaishi! Dori Dorin vs. Raino); 27. "The Legendary Hundred-Man Slayer" (伝説の100人切り, Densetsu no Hyaku-nin-giri); 28. "Happy vs. Chee" (ハッピー vs. チィ, Happī vs. Chii); 29. "Poison" (毒, Doku); 30. "Ether Moon" (エーテルムーン, Ēteru Mūn)
| 4 | October 9, 2019 | 978-4-06-517562-0 | June 9, 2020 (digital) | 978-1-64659-384-2 |
31. "Out-of-Control Power" (暴走する力, Bōsō suru Chikara); 32. "Happy the Hero" (勇者ハッピー, Yūsha Happī); 33. "The Banquet" (宴, Utage); 34. "Eleph vs. Agi" (エレフ vs. アギ, Erefu vs. Agi); 35. "Helping Wild Town" (ワイルドタウンでお手伝い, Wairudo Taun de Otetsudai); 36. "To Cool Land!" (クールランドへ!, Kūru Rando e!); 37. "The Monster in the Frozen Village" (凍える村の怪物, Kogoeru Mura no Kaibutsu); 38. "Fire and Ice" (炎と氷, Honō to Kōri); 39. "Trembling Ground" (震える大地, Furueru Daichi); 40. "Whom the Machine Serves" (誰が為の機械, Dare ga Tame no Kikai)
| 5 | January 17, 2020 | — | August 18, 2020 (digital) | 978-1-64659-647-8 |
41. "Envoys from a Faraway Land" (遠い国からの使者, Tōi Kuni kara no Shisha); 42. "The Holy Kingdom" (ホーリーキングダム, Hōrī Kingudamu); 43. "Dark Clouds" (暗雲, An'un); 44. "The Devil's Messenger" (悪魔の使者, Akuma no Shisha); 45. "A Guiding Voice" (導きの声, Michibiki no Koe); 46. "The Healthy Crystal's Friend" (ヘルシークリスタルの友達, Herushī Kurisutaru no Tomodachi); 47. "Cinq Exorcistes" (五獣祓魔師(サンクエクソシスト), Sanku Ekusoshisuto); 48. "The Secret of the Crystal" (クリスタルの秘密, Kurisutaru no Himitsu); 49. "The Power to Protect the Faithful" (信じるものを守る力を, Shinjiru Mono o Mamoru Chikara o); 50. "Helping Hand" (救いの手, Sukui no Te)
| 6 | March 9, 2020 | — | October 20, 2020 (digital) | 978-1-64659-415-3 |
51. "Mental Battle" (心の戦い, Kokoro no Tatakai); 52. "The Flame of Hope" (希望の炎, Kibō no Honō); 53. "Shadow" (シャドー, Shadō); 54. "Living Together" (共に生きる, Tomo ni Ikiru); 55. "The Secret of the Tower" (塔の秘密, Tō no Himitsu); 56. "Marice and the Three Beast Musketeers" (メアリスと三銃士, Mearisu to Sanjūshi); 57. "Evolution Magic" (進化の魔法, Shinka no Mahō); 58. "The Secret Garden" (シークレット・ガーデン, Shīkuretto Gāden); 59. "False Paradise" (偽りの楽園, Itsuwari no Rakuen); 60. "The Way to Paradise" (楽園への道, Rakuen e no Michi)
| 7 | May 8, 2020 | — | December 29, 2020 (digital) | 978-1-64659-882-3 |
61. "The Way to Paradise" (楽園への道, Rakuen e no Michi); 62. "A Weapon Birthing Weapons" (兵器を生む兵器, Heiki o Umu Heiki); 63. "The Three Treasures" (3つの宝, Mittsu no Takara); 64. "Summoned Purpose" (呼ばれた理由, Yobareta Riyū); 65. "Awaiting the Beginning" (始まりを待つ, Hajimari o Matsu); 66. "Several Thousand Nights and Mornings Later" (数十万の夜と朝の果て, Sū-jūman no Yoru to Asa no Hate); 67. "Awakening" (目覚め, Mezame); 68. "Their Own Power" (自らの力で, Mizukara no Chikara de); 69. "In a True Paradise" (本当の楽園で, Hontō no Rakuen de); 70. "Searching for a Way Home" (帰り道を探して, Kaeri Michi o Sagashite)
| 8 | June 9, 2020 | — | February 16, 2021 (digital) | 978-1-64659-961-5 |
71. "Calamity Strikes" (厄災襲来, Yakusai Shūrai); 72. "The Three Mythical Beasts" (三幻獣, Sangenjū); 73. "Agi's Wish" (アギの願い, Agi no Negai); 74. "Fighting Tough Enemies" (強敵の戦い, Kyōteki no Tatakai); 75. "Star of Despair" (絶望の星, Zetsubō no Hoshi); 76. "The Hero's Protectors" (勇者を守る者, Yūsha o Mamoru Mono); 77. "The Little Ones' Fight" (小さき者の戦い, Chiisaki Mono no Tatakai); 78. "Motherly Love and Protection" (子を慈しみ守るもの, Ko o Itsukushimi Mamoru Mono); 79. "Dragon Slayer" (滅竜魔導士(ドラゴンスレイヤー), Doragon Sureiyā); 80. "Our Story Here" (ここにある物語, Koko ni Aru Monogatari)

=== Fairy Tail City Hero ===
Fairy Tail City Hero (stylized in all caps) is a spin-off written and illustrated by Ushio Andō that reimagines characters from Fairy Tail as members of a modern day police force. It was first launched on Magazine Pocket on October 26, 2018, and ended on November 22, 2019.

| No. | Original release date | Original ISBN | English release date | English ISBN |
|---|---|---|---|---|
| 1 | March 8, 2019 | 978-4-06-514784-9 | September 24, 2019 (digital) | 978-1-64659-013-1 |
1. "Team Fairy Tail" (特別班(チーム) 妖精の尻尾(フェアリーテイル), Chīmu Fearī Teiru); 2. "Crack Down on the Motorcycle Gang!" (取り締まれ! 暴走族!!, Torishimare! Bōsōzoku); 3. "No Mercy for Panty Thieves!" (下着ドロ､ 許すまじ!, Shitagidoro, Yurusumaji!); 4. "Bank Robbers 1" (バンクラバー①, Banku Rabā 1); 5. "Bank Robbers 2" (バンクラバー②, Banku Rabā 2); 6. "Hunky Detective Meeen" (イケメェーン探偵, Ikemeēn Tantei); 7. "The Masked Thief Comes to Call 1" (怪盗仮面参上①, Kaitō Kamen Sanjō 1)
| 2 | July 9, 2019 | 978-4-06-515722-0 | November 5, 2019 (digital) | 978-1-64659-101-5 |
8. "The Masked Thief Comes to Call 2" (怪盗仮面参上②, Kaitō Kamen Sanjō 2); 9. "The Masked Thief Comes to Call 3" (怪盗仮面参上③, Kaitō Kamen Sanjō 3); 10. "The Sky Sisters 1" (天空シスターズ①, Tenkū Shisutāzu 1); 11. "The Sky Sisters 2" (天空シスターズ②, Tenkū Shisutāzu 2); 12. "The Sky Sisters 3" (天空シスターズ③, Tenkū Shisutāzu 3); 13. "The Princess and the Thunder Beast 1" (姫と雷獣①, Hime to Raijū 1); 14. "The Princess and the Thunder Beast 2" (姫と雷獣②, Hime to Raijū 2); 15. "The Princess and the Thunder Beast 3" (姫と雷獣③, Hime to Raijū 3); 16. "Ten Thousand Hostages 1" (1万人の人質①, Ichiman-nin no Hitojichi 1); 17. "Ten Thousand Hostages 2" (1万人の人質②, Ichiman-nin no Hitojichi 2); 18. "Ten Thousand Hostages 3" (1万人の人質③, Ichiman-nin no Hitojichi 3); 19. "Master Ziemma (マスター・ジエンマ, Masutā Jienma); 20. "Rookie Officer Mavis 1" (新人警察官メイビス①, Shinjin Keisatsukan Meibisu 1)
| 3 | October 9, 2019 | 978-4-06-517209-4 | July 7, 2020 (digital) | 978-1-64659-401-6 |
21. "Rookie Officer Mavis 2" (新人警察官メイビス②, Shinjin Keisatsukan Meibisu 2); 22. "Rookie Officer Mavis 3" (新人警察官メイビス③, Shinjin Keisatsukan Meibisu 3); 23. "Middle Manager Invel" (中間管理職インベル, Chūkan Kanrishoku Inberu); 24. "Our Dear Christina" (愛しのクリスティーナ, Itoshi no Kurisutīna); 25. "The Special Arms Department" (特殊武装部隊, Tokusha Busō Butai); 26. "Up Close and Personal! 24 Hours with Team Fairy Tail 1" (密着! 妖精の尻尾(フェアリーテイル)24時①, Mitchaku! Fearī Teiru Nijūyon-ji 1); 27. "Up Close and Personal! 24 Hours with Team Fairy Tail 2" (密着! 妖精の尻尾(フェアリーテイル)24時②, Mitchaku! Fearī Teiru Nijūyon-ji 2); 28. "Slayer Love School Festival 1" (滅LOVE学園祭①, Metsu Rabu Gakuensai 1); 29. "Slayer Love School Festival 1" (滅LOVE学園祭②, Metsu Rabu Gakuensai 2); 30. "Happy Birthday" (ハッピーバースデー, Happī Bāsudē); 31. "The Dragon King Takes a Stroll" (竜王散歩, Ryūō Sanpo); 32. "Battle of the Beasts" (怪獣大戦争, Kaijū Daisensō); 33. "The Professional" (プロフェッショナル, Purofesshonaru)
| 4 | February 2, 2020 | 978-4-06-517879-9 | August 11, 2020 (digital) | 978-1-64659-634-8 |
34. "White Bliss" (白の快楽, Shiro no Kairaku); 35. "Boy Meets Girl" (ボーイ ミーツ ガール, Bōi Mītsu Gāru); 36. "Master Director Erza" (巨匠エルザ監督, Kyoshō Eruza Kantoku); 37. "Cats in Danger" (あぶない猫, Abunai Neko); 38. "Do You Remember?" (記憶している?, Kioku Shiteiru?); 39. "Always Together" (ずっと一緒, Zutto Issho); 40. "Sweet Camouflage 1" (甘い偽装①, Amai Gisō 1); 41. "Sweet Camouflage 2" (甘い偽装②, Amai Gisō 2); 42. "No Recollection 1" (記憶にございません①, Kioku ni Gozaimasen 1); 43. "No Recollection 2" (記憶にございません②, Kioku ni Gozaimasen 2); 44. "Eclipse" (エクリプス, Ekuripusu); 45. "When Eclipse Opens" (エクリプスが開く時, Ekuripusu ga Hiraku Toki)

=== Fairy Tail Re:Fantasia ===
Fairy Tail Re:Fantasia (stylized in all caps) is a miniseries written and illustrated by Hiro Mashima to celebrate the 20th anniversary of the series' publication. It began serialization in Weekly Shōnen Magazine on July 29, 2026.

| No. | Release date | ISBN |
|---|---|---|
| 1 | October 16, 2026 | 978-4-06-545326-1 |
1. "Words Aren't Enough" (言葉じゃ足りなくて, Kotoba ja Tarinakute); 2. "The Pair at the Cathedral" (礼拝堂の二人, Reihaidō no Futari); 3. "Kal Eraser" (カル・イレイサー, Karu Ireisā); 4. "Laxus Drops In!" (ラクサス参上!, Rakusasu Sanjō!); 5. "Moratorium" (モラトリアム, Moratoriamu); 6. "Fairies Dance" (妖精が舞う, Yōsei ga Mau); 7. "Lost Fairy" (ロストフェアリー, Rosuto Fearī); 8. "The Harvest Festival" (収穫祭, Shūkaku-sai); 9. "Kiss" (くちづけ, Kuchizuke)

== See also ==
- Fairy Tail Zero, a prequel series written by Hiro Mashima
- Fairy Tail: 100 Years Quest, a sequel series written by Hiro Mashima and illustrated by Atsuo Ueda
