= Kazuo Koike =

Japanese manga writer (1936–2019)

Kazuo Koike 小池 一夫
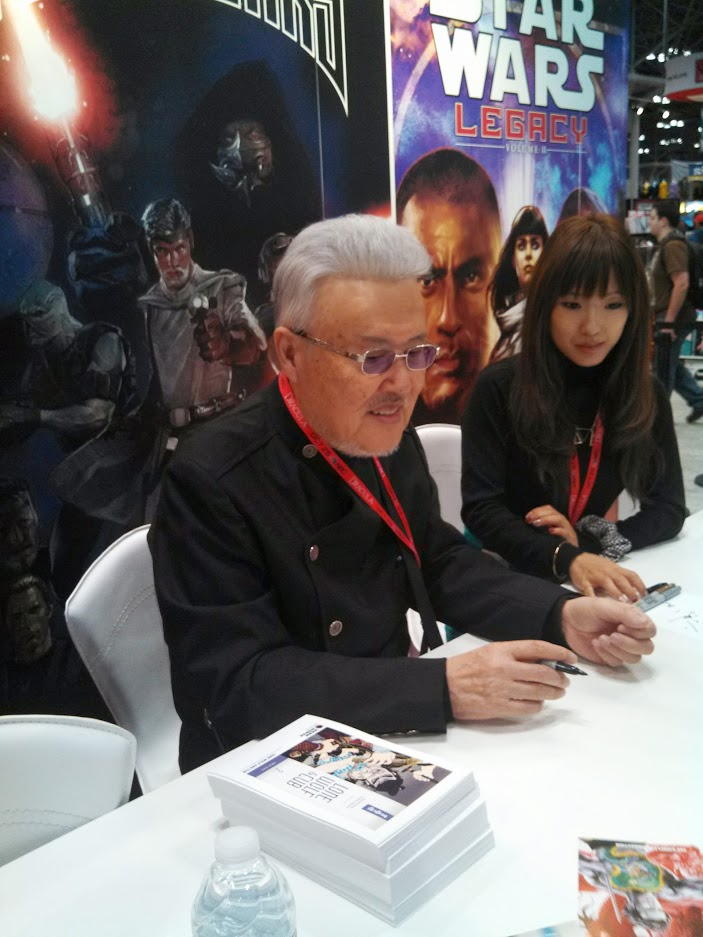
- Koike at New York Comic Con, 2013
- Born: May 8, 1936 Daisen, Akita, Japan
- Died: April 17, 2019 (aged 82)
- Area: Writer
- Notable works: Lone Wolf and Cub; Lady Snowblood; Crying Freeman
- Awards: Hall of Fame Eisner Award (2004)

Kazuo Koike (Japanese: 小池 一夫, Hepburn: Koike Kazuo; May 8, 1936 – April 17, 2019) was a Japanese manga writer (gensakusha), novelist, screenwriter, lyricist and entrepreneur. He is best known for his violent, artful seinen manga, notably Lone Wolf and Cub (with Goseki Kojima, 1970–6), Lady Snowblood (with Kazuo Kamimura, 1972–3) and Crying Freeman (with Ryoichi Ikegami, 1986–8), which – along with their numerous media adaptations − have been credited for their influence on the international growth of Japanese popular culture.

== Life and career ==
Early in Koike's career, he studied under Takao Saito. He began his manga career at Saito Production in 1968, working on series such as Muyōnosuke and as a founding scriptwriter for Golgo 13.

Koike, along with artist Goseki Kojima, made the manga Lone Wolf and Cub, and Koike also contributed to the scripts for the 1970s film adaptations of the series, which starred famous Japanese actor Tomisaburo Wakayama. In 1992 he himself produced a Lone Wolf and Cub film, Lone Wolf and Cub: Final Conflict which starred Masakazu Tamura. Koike and Kojima became known as the "Golden Duo" because of the success of Lone Wolf and Cub.

In the 1970s, Koike was exceptionally prolific, working on dozens of manga series. Notable collaborations from this period include Secretary Bird with Monkey Punch (1970), a story with Kazuo Umezu (1973), and Hanappe Bazooka with Go Nagai (1979-82). He also founded Studio Ship (later Koike Shoin) in 1972 as a production house and publisher.

Another series written by Koike, Crying Freeman, which was illustrated by Ryoichi Ikegami, was adapted into a 1995 live-action film by French director Christophe Gans. In addition to his more violent, action-oriented manga, Koike, an avid golfer, has also written golf manga. He has also written mahjong manga, as he himself is a former professional mahjong player.

Koike's later works included the long-running Auction House (with Seisaku Kano) and Yume Genji Tsurugi No Saimon, a novel serialized in the Mainichi Shimbun with illustrations by Rumiko Takahashi. His manga output slowed in the 21st century as he focused on teaching and writing theoretical books on character creation. In the early 2000s, he wrote a Wolverine story for Marvel Comics. In 2011, Koike announced his intention to write a magical girl manga series titled Maho Shojo Mimitsuki Mimi no QED.

On April 17, 2019, Kazuo Koike died due to pneumonia at the age of 82. His death happened just five days after the death of fellow prolific manga artist Monkey Punch on April 11, who also died of pneumonia and who Koike considered his rival in the Weekly Manga Action magazine.

== Themes ==
Koike's work is characterized by hyper-violence and choreographed action; his stories are known for graphic, meticulously detailed depictions of violence where fights and assassinations are treated as brutal, artful ballets, most famously realized in the swordplay of Lone Wolf and Cub and the gunplay of Crying Freeman. This violence is frequently contextualized by a deep exploration of existential codes and personal honor. Many of Koike's protagonists, such as Ogami Ittō in Lone Wolf and Cub or Yo Hinomura in Crying Freeman, operate under a strict, personal code that justifies their actions, placing them in constant conflict with societal laws and morality.

Sexuality and eroticism are frank and frequent elements in Koike's narratives, ranging from consensual passion to depictions of sexual violence. Series like Wounded Man and I Ueo Boy are, as scholar Joe McCulloch writes, noted for their fusion of rage and eroticized intensity, while Lady Snowblood uses its protagonist's sexuality as a calculated weapon for vengeance.

His content often served a larger purpose of social critique. Works like I Ueo Boy and Mad Bull 34 are infused with a spirit of social anger and anarchic rebellion, featuring anti-heroes who violently reject corrupt systems of power, reflecting, according to McCulloch, the tense, protest-heavy atmosphere of 1970s Japan in which Koike rose to prominence.

== Gekiga Sonjuku ==
In 1977, Koike founded the Gekiga Sonjuku (劇画村塾), a vocational school to teach manga artists, manga writers (or gensakusha), and screenwriters. The school's pedagogy was built on Koike's belief that compelling character creation was the foundation of storytelling, rather than plotting a narrative from the outset.In 2009, the school became independent from Koike and renamed itself Manga Rak (漫画楽).

Notable graduates:

- Marley Caribu – manga writer: Old Boy
- Hideyuki Kikuchi – horror writer: Vampire Hunter D
- Akira Sakuma – game designer, freelance writer: Momotaro Densetsu series
- Rumiko Takahashi – manga artist: Urusei Yatsura, Ranma ½, InuYasha
- Hiroshi Miyaoka – game designer: Metal Max series
- Atsuji Yamamoto – manga artist: Ultimate Teacher
- Tetsuo Hara – manga artist: Fist of the North Star
- Yuji Horii – game designer, freelance writer: Dragon Quest series
- Naoki Yamamoto – manga artist: Dance till Tomorrow
- Takayuki Yamaguchi – manga artist: Apocalypse Zero and Shigurui
- Keisuke Itagaki – manga artist: Baki the Grappler
- Hiroshi Takashige – manga writer: Spriggan
- Hiroshi Shiibashi – manga artist: Nura: Rise of the Yokai Clan
- Bingo Morihashi – author and video game writer: Devil May Cry series
- Yoshio Sawai – manga artist: Bobobo-bo Bo-bobo
- Aoi Nanase – manga artist: Angel/Dust

== Bibliography ==
- Lone Wolf and Cub, with artist Goseki Kojima, 1970–1976
- Goyōkiba, also known as Hanzo the Razor, with artist Takeshi Kanda, 1970 - 1976
- Hulk: The Manga, with artist Yoshihiro Morifuji, November 24, 1970 – January 6, 1971
- Lady Snowblood, with artist Kazuo Kamimura, 1972–1973
- Samurai Executioner, with artist Goseki Kojima, 1972–1976
- Musashi, with artist Noboru Kawasaki, 1974–1977
- Kei no Seishun, with artist Goseki Kojima, 1978–1980
- Adolescent Zoo, with artist Hiromi Yamasaki, 1978–1981
- Nijitte Monogatari, with artist Satomi Koe, 1978–2003
- Path of the Assassin, with artist Goseki Kojima, 1978–1984
- Hanappe Bazooka, with artist Go Nagai, June 7, 1979 – January 7, 1982
- Wounded Man, with artist Ryoichi Ikegami, 1983–1986
- Mad Bull 34, with artist Noriyoshi Inoue, 1985–1991
- Crying Freeman, with artist Ryoichi Ikegami, 1986–1988
- Kawaite sōrō, with artist Goseki Kojima, 1995–1999
- X-Men Unlimited #50, 2003
- Kajō, with artist Hideki Mori, 2003–2006
- New Lone Wolf and Cub, with artist Hideki Mori, 2003–2006
- Yume Genji Tsurugi no Saimon, with artist Natsuki Sumeragi, 2006–?
- Shura Yukihime Gaiden, with artist Ryoichi Ikegami, 2009–?
- Oda Nobunaga, with artist Goseki Kojima, ?-?
- Offered, with artist Ryoichi Ikegami, ?-?
- Color of Rage, with artist Seisaku Kano, ?-?

== Awards ==
- 2004: Won the Hall of Fame Eisner Award
