= Samurai Executioner =

1972–1976 manga

- Samurai Executioner Volume 1

首斬り朝 (Kubikiri Asa)
- Genre: Drama, Historical
- Manga
- Written by: Kazuo Koike
- Illustrated by: Goseki Kojima
- Published by: Kodansha
- English publisher: NA: Dark Horse Comics
- Original run: 1972 – 1976
- Volumes: 10
- icon

Samurai Executioner, known in Japan as Kubikiri Asa (首斬り朝), is a 10-volume manga created by writer Kazuo Koike and artist Goseki Kojima, the same team that created the popular Lone Wolf and Cub series. The series was first serialized in Japan, from 1972 to 1976. Samurai Executioner is set earlier than Lone Wolf and Cub, with the main character of the former series appearing in a chapter of the latter.

The story is set in the Edo period of feudal Japan. It revolves around Yamada Asaemon (山田 朝右衞門, Yamada Asaemon), nicknamed Kubikiri-Asa (literally "Neck-chopper Asa", often translated as "Decapitator Asaemon"), a rōnin who is responsible for testing new swords for the shogun. The character is based on a real-life line of sword-testers who served the Tokugawa Shogunate up to the early 19th century. He is also frequently called upon to perform executions.

Many of the stories focus not on Asaemon, but on several of the people he meets in the course of his work. More often than not they are the stories of the criminals he executes, told as their last words before receiving the fatal stroke. As with Lone Wolf and Cub's Ogami Itto, such encounters often give Asa pause for thought.

== Overview ==
Each volume is written with historical accuracy, set in the Edo period of feudal Japan, although the characters themselves are fictional.

Although composed largely of unrelated anthology stories, the series follows Yamada Asaemon (also called Yamada Yoshitsugu and nicknamed Kubikiri Asa), a young rōnin who assumes the post of sword-tester during the 1700s. Asaemon's reputation is fearsome among the populace because he killed both his father and his first love. He performed the former at his father's insistence, as the terminally ill man wanted to test his successor's swordsmanship in an act of seppuku; the latter was his first execution: a criminal who had seduced him as a boy years earlier. He is atypical of portrayals of rōnin in that he has a governmental post, owns a substantial house, and does not normally roam the countryside. He refuses to marry and have a family, but in one story, marries and immediately divorces a woman, but tells her that she will always be the wife of his spirit.

=== Recurring characters ===
- Sakane Kasajiro (坂根 傘次郎), nicknamed Catcher Kasajiro (畳捕り傘次郎): Introduced in the story "Spark Umbrella" (Volume 5: Ten Fingers, One Life); one of Edo's best policemen, who often uses a hook and rope to capture those he arrests. A lower-caste samurai, he looks up to Asaemon as a teacher and colleague and is the person closest to Asaemon. He is married to former criminal "Shinko the Kappa".
- Sakane Shinko (坂根 新子), nicknamed Shinko the Kappa (河童の新子): Kasajiro's wife, named for the kappa tattooed on her back. Daughter of executed yakuza Yaheiji (弥兵次), she is a criminal who crosses paths with policeman Kasajiro. After Kasajiro decides to marry Shinko in an attempt at reforming the criminal, Asaemon adopts her and acts in the place of the father-in-law at the wedding. Though her and Kasajiro's relationship is often toxic, they grow closer and she joins him on the police force. The single story not to feature Asaemon, "A Couple of Jitte", focuses on them.

=== Crossover with Lone Wolf and Cub ===
Not long after the series' debut, creators Kazuo Koike and Goseki Kojima depicted Asaemon's fate in their popular series Lone Wolf and Cub. Years after the events of Samurai Executioner, Asaemon is ordered by his superiors to kill Ogami Ittō, thrusting him into conflict with the Yagyū clan, who are already at war with Ittō. The two men meet and agree to test their swords on stone-cut Buddhist statues. Ittō thrusts his sword at Asaemon, breaking the latter's sword and resulting in his death. Ittō observes that the statues had iron collars placed on them by the Yagyū, but which rōnin they intended to sabotage is unclear. This story is collected in the fifth trade paperback published by Dark Horse Comics, Black Wind. One reviewer notes that Asaemon looks different in this series, possibly due to Ogami Ittō being designed so similarly to the original Asaemon.

The character is also portrayed by actor Gō Wakabayashi in the "Headhunter Asaemon" episode of the Lone Wolf and Cub television series.

== Publication ==
There are a total of 54 stories. An English translation of the series by Dana Lewis and Marc Miyake was published in the United States by Dark Horse Comics from 2004 to 2006. In the back of each volume is a glossary of Japanese terms not translated into English for lack of an equivalent word.

In 2014, Dark Horse re-released the series, collecting the stories into four larger format "Omnibus" volumes.

== List of volumes ==
The ten volumes are as follows (in English from Dark Horse Comics):

1. When the Demon Knife Weeps
2. Two Bodies, Two Minds
3. The Hell Stick
4. Portrait of Death
5. Ten Fingers, One Life
6. Shinko the Kappa
7. The Bamboo Splitter
8. The Death Sign of Spring
9. Facing Life and Death
10. A Couple of Jitte
