= Goseki Kojima =

Japanese manga artist (1928–2000)

- Born: November 3, 1928 Yokkaichi, Mie, Japan
- Died: January 5, 2000 (aged 71)
- Areas: Penciller, Inker
- Notable works: Lone Wolf and Cub
- Awards: Hall of Fame Eisner Award (2004)

Goseki Kojima (小島 剛夕, Kojima Gōseki; November 3, 1928 – January 5, 2000) was a Japanese manga artist. He is known for his collaborations with manga writer Kazuo Koike, the most famous of them being Lone Wolf and Cub.

== Biography ==
Kojima was born in Yokkaichi, Mie, on the same day as Osamu Tezuka. After getting out of junior high school, Kojima painted advertising posters for movie theaters as his source of income.

In 1950, he moved to Tokyo. The post-World War II environment led to forms of manga meant for impoverished audiences. Kojima created art for kamishibai or "paper play" narrators. Kojima then started to create works for the kashi-bon market but soon started working as an assistant of manga artist Sanpei Shirato. In 1957, he made his manga artist debut with Onmitsu Kuroyoden.

In 1967, Kojima created the ninja adventure Dojinki, his first manga for a magazine. In 1970, he and writer Kazuo Koike created Kozure Okami (Lone Wolf and Cub), the first and most famous of their four major collaborations. Koike and Kojima were dubbed "the Golden Duo".

In his later years, Kojima adapted some of the films of his favorite director, Akira Kurosawa, into graphic novels. Kojima died on January 5, 2000, at the age of 71.

== Awards ==
- 2004: Won the Hall of Fame Eisner Award

== Bibliography ==
Comics work includes:

- Kozure Okami (Lone Wolf and Cub), with writer Kazuo Koike, 1970–1976
- Kogarashi Monjirō, with writer Saho Sasazawa
- Kubikiri Asa (Samurai Executioner), with writer Kazuo Koike, 1972–1976
- Kei no Seishun, with writer Kazuo Koike, 1978–1980
- Hanzo no Mon (Path of the Assassin), with writer Kazuo Koike, 1978–1984
- Kawaite sōrō, with writer Kazuo Koike, 1981–82
