= Akasaka Station (Tokyo) =

Metro station in Tokyo, Japan

Akasaka Station 赤坂駅

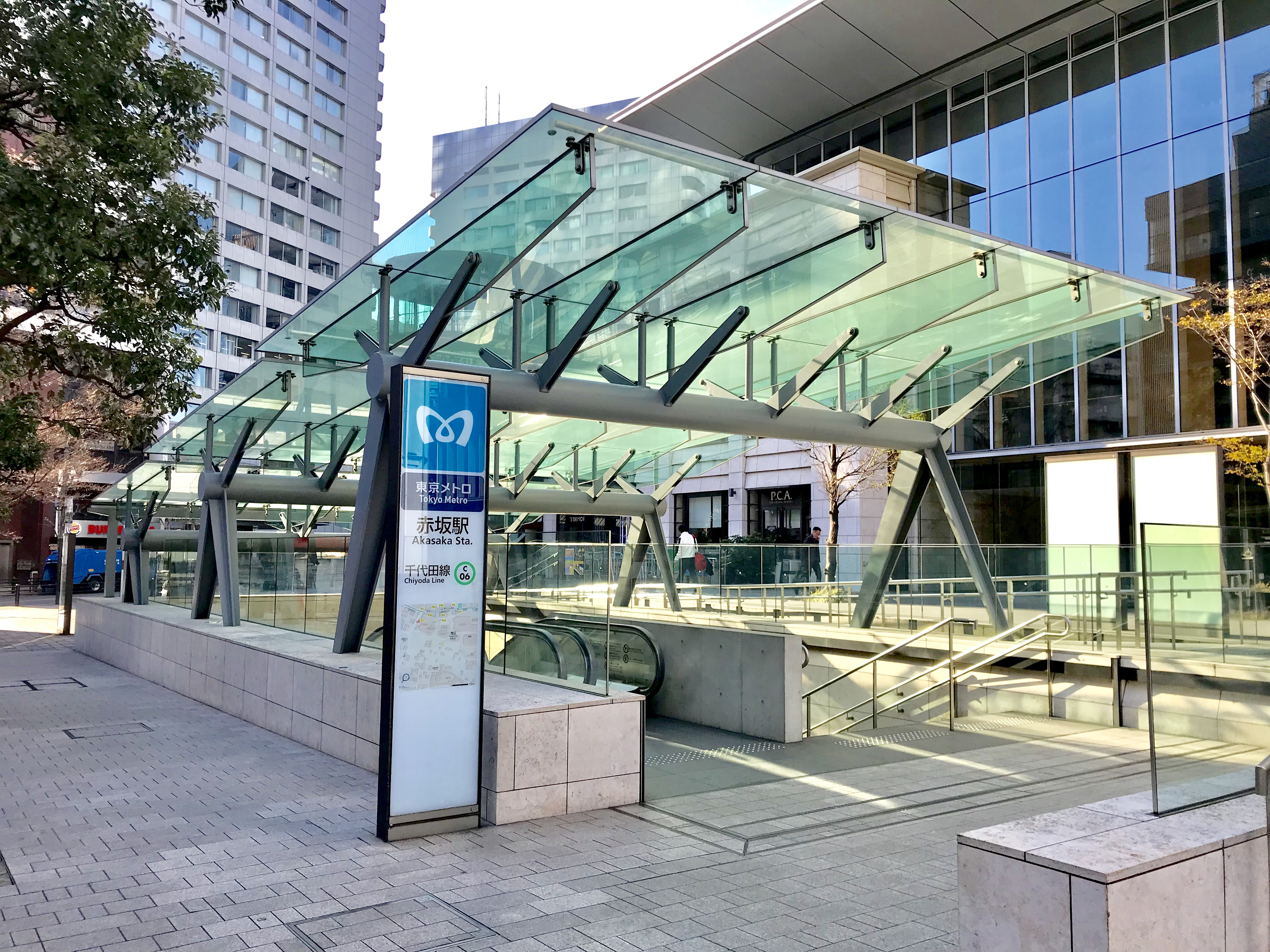
- Akasaka Station entrance, January 2019

General information
- Location: 5-4-5 Akasaka, Minato, Tokyo （東京都港区赤坂5-4-5） Japan
- Coordinates: 35°40′21″N 139°44′12″E
- Operator: Tokyo Metro
- Line: Chiyoda Line
- Platforms: 1 island platform
- Tracks: 2
- Connections: Bus stop

Construction
- Structure type: Underground

Other information
- Station code: C-06

History
- Opened: 20 October 1972; 53 years ago

Services
Preceding station	Tokyo Metro	Following station
Nogizaka towards Yoyogi-Uehara	Chiyoda Line	Kokkai-gijidō-mae towards Kita-Ayase
Location
- Location within Tokyo Yamanote Loop Location within Tokyo wards area Location within Japan

Akasaka Station (赤坂駅, Akasaka-eki) is a subway station on the Tokyo Metro Chiyoda Line in the Akasaka district of Minato, Tokyo, Japan, operated by Tokyo Metro.

== Lines ==
Akasaka Station is served by the Tokyo Metro Chiyoda Line, and is numbered C-06.

== Station layout ==
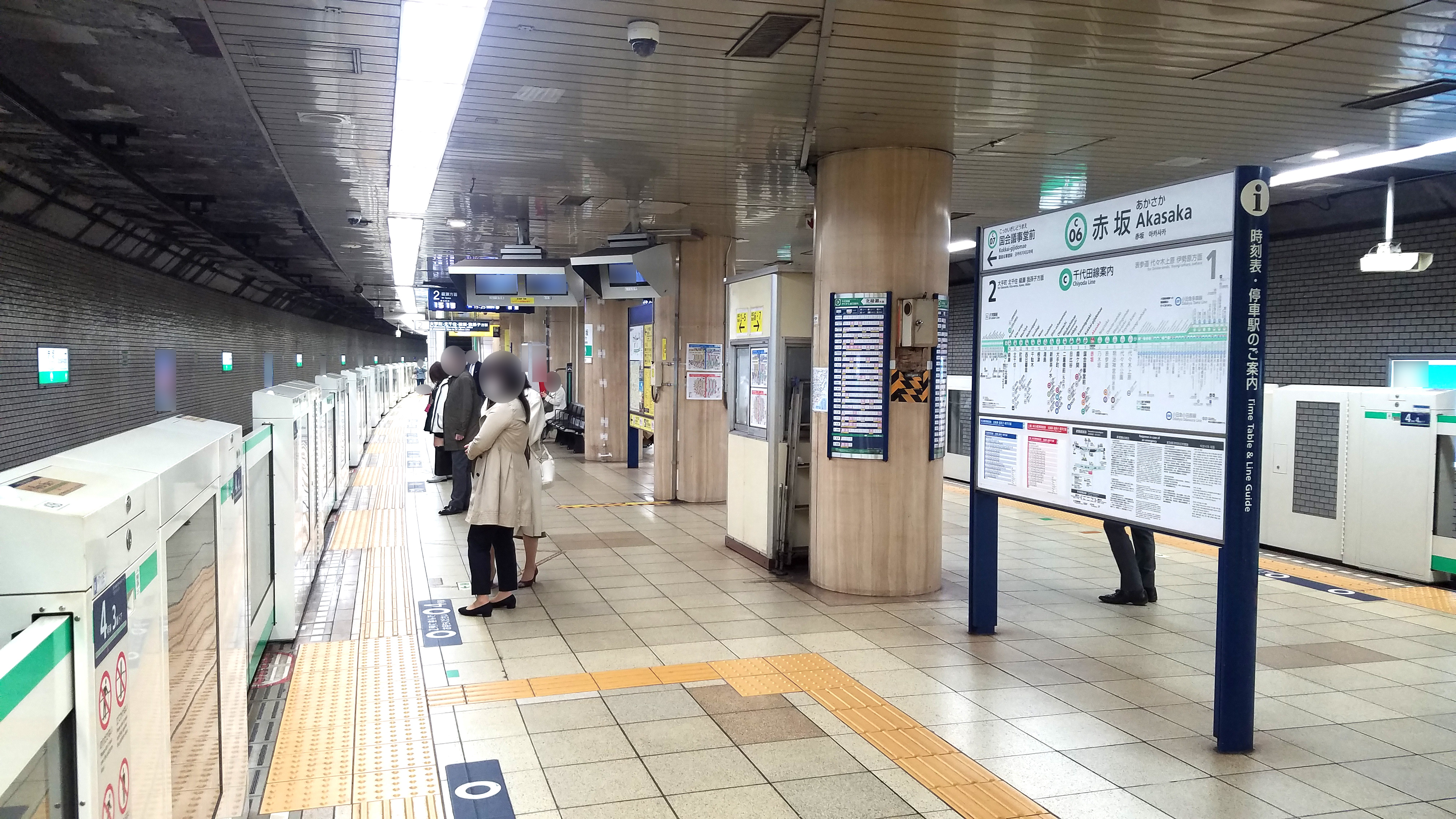
The platform in March 2022

The station consists of a single island platform serving two tracks.

=== Platforms ===
1	Chiyoda Line	for Omote-sando and Yoyogi-uehara; Odakyu Odawara Line for Hon-Atsugi and Isehara
2	Chiyoda Line	for Otemachi, Kita-senju, Ayase, and Kita-ayase; Joban Line (Local) for Abiko and Toride

== History ==
The station was opened on 20 October 1972 by the Teito Rapid Transit Authority (TRTA).

The station facilities were inherited by Tokyo Metro after the privatization of the TRTA in 2004.

== Surrounding area ==
The station is located adjacent to the headquarters of Tokyo Broadcasting System Holdings, Inc. Automated platform and on-board announcements identify the station as Akasaka, Akasaka, TBS-mae.

- Akasaka Sacas
  - TBS Broadcasting Center (the headquarters of TBS Holdings, Inc., TBS Television, Inc., TBS Radio, Inc., etc.)
  - Akasaka Biz Tower
  - Akasaka Blitz
  - Akasaka Act Theatre
