= Hakuhodo DY Holdings =

Japanese advertising holding company

Hakuhodo DY Holdings Inc.

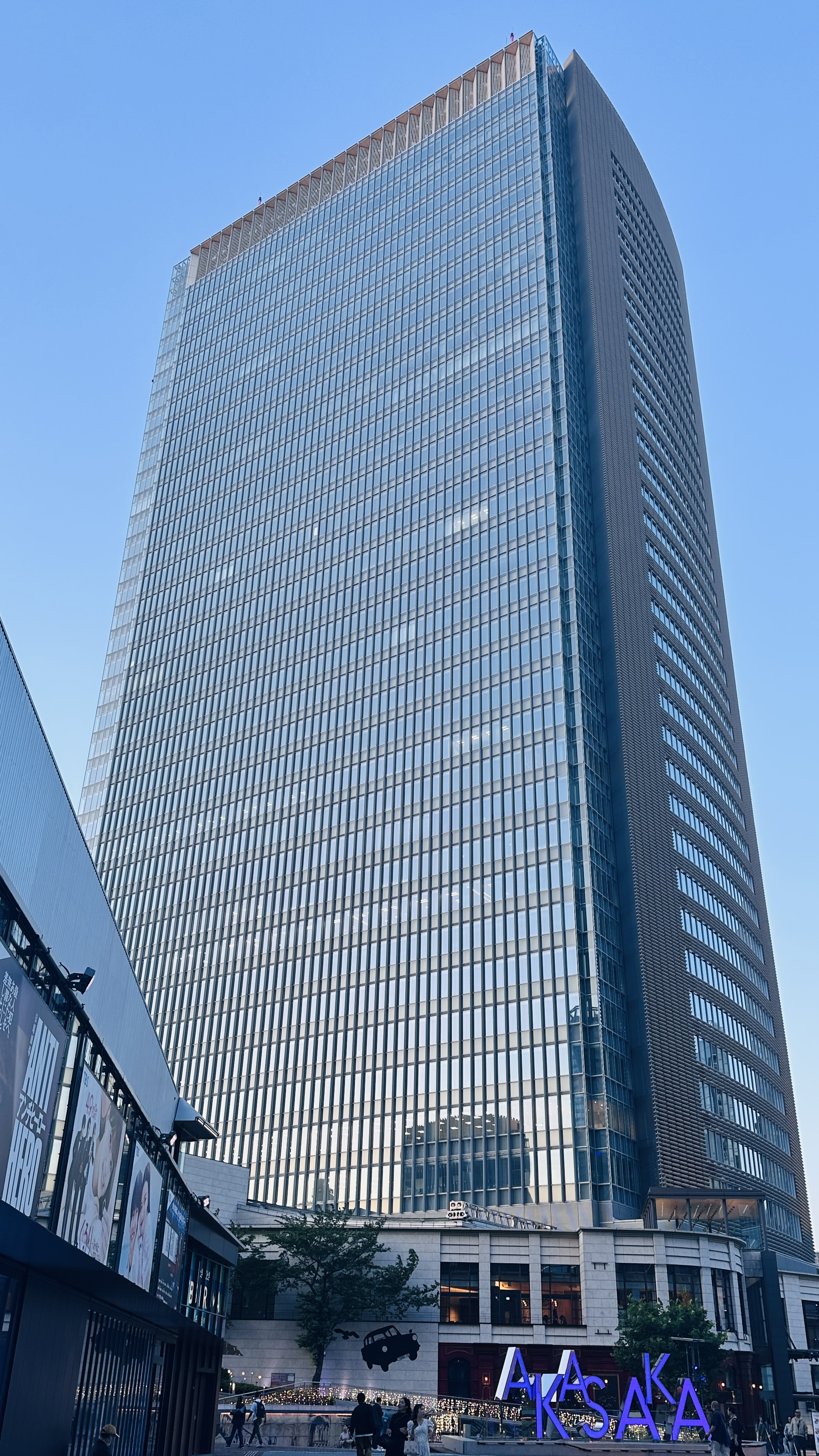
- Hakuhodo DY's headquarters in Minato, Tokyo
- Native name: 株式会社博報堂DYホールディングス
- Company type: Public
- Traded as: TYO: 2433
- Industry: Advertising
- Founded: October 1, 2003; 22 years ago
- Headquarters: Akasaka, Minato, Tokyo, Japan
- Key people: Yūichi Toda (CEO); Masayuki Mizushima (President)
- Revenue: ▲¥32.926 billion yen (2022)
- Operating income: ▲¥71.642 billion yen (2022)
- Net income: ▲¥75.74 billion yen (2022)
- Number of employees: 301 (linking to 27,413) (2022)
- Subsidiaries: Hakuhodo; Daiko; Yomiko Advertising; IREP; Kyu Investment; Hakuhodo DY Total Support; Hakuhodo DY Capco; Hakuhodo DY IO
- Website: www.hakuhodody-holdings.co.jp

Hakuhodo DY Holdings Inc. (株式会社博報堂DYホールディングス) is a Japanese advertising holding company that owns Hakuhodo, Daiko, and Yomiko Advertising. It is the second largest advertising company in Japan, following Dentsu. Its headquarters are located in Akasaka, Minato, Tokyo.

== History ==
On December 3, 2002, the second-largest advertising agency, Hakuhodo, along with the fifth-largest, Daiko, and the sixth-largest, Yomiko, announced that they had agreed to establish a holding company and integrate their management by October 2003. This was the first integration of Japanese advertising companies, with the aim of pursuing the expansion of their business and competing with their largest domestic rival, Dentsu. The combined revenue of the three companies reached about 1 trillion yen, and they became the eighth largest advertising company in the world. According to the agreement, the three companies will enter the holding company as they are. After the establishment of the holding company, the companies will separate their media purchase businesses and content (program, project) development businesses from their existing structures and integrate them under a newly established media business company.

On March 7, the name of the holding company was announced as Hakuhodo DY Holdings Inc and its president was announced as Tomio Miyagawa, the president of Hakuhodo. Ryuichi Tokai, the chairman of Hakuhodo, Ken Adachi, the chairman of Daiko, and Makoto Toriyama, the president of Yomiko Advertising, were appointed as chairman and vice chairmen of the holding company, respectively. The new company name for the consolidation of the business of buying advertising space from television, newspapers, and other media is Hakuhodo DY Media Partners (Hakuhodo DYM).

On April 17, 2003, the three companies decided to list the planned holding company on the first section of the Tokyo Stock Exchange in October 2004. Following Dentsu's listing in November 2001, Hakuhodo had initially announced plans to list independently in the autumn of 2003, but had changed its direction in December of the previous year to list the holding company formed by the integration of the three companies.

On August 5, 2003, the three companies announced that the management integration and establishment of the holding company would be carried out on October 1. The capital of the holding company was 10 billion yen, and it had about 70 employees. In addition, one share of the holding company's stock was exchanged for each share of Hakuhodo stock, 0.341 shares for each share of Daiko stock, and 0.276 shares for each share of Yomiko stock.

On September 29, the three companies announced the management plan of Hakuhodo DY Holdings. The holding company will start with a capital of 10 billion yen and 86 employees, with the goal of listing its shares in the fall of 2004. The plan is to increase the combined sales of the three companies from 985.4 billion yen in fiscal year 2002 to 1.1 trillion yen in fiscal year 2005, and to raise their share of domestic advertising expenses from the current 17% to over 18% by fiscal year 2005. Tomio Miyagawa, who will become the president of the holding company, stated that "we will challenge Dentsu, which is the industry leader. The three companies under the holding company umbrella will continue to compete as before, and we want to demonstrate the effect of integration as a whole."

On October 1, 2003, the management integration and establishment of the holding company were completed.

On December 1, 2003, Hakuhodo DY Holdings announced the establishment of a wholly owned subsidiary, Hakuhodo DYM. The new subsidiary consolidated the purchasing of advertising space and planning of sports events that Hakuhodo, Daiko, and Yomiko Advertising had previously done independently.

On June 30, Hakuhodo DY Holdings announced its first settlement, the consolidated financial results for the fiscal year ending March 2004, with net sales of 906.6 billion yen, operating income of 18 billion yen, and net income of 7.1 billion yen.

On January 16, 2005, it was announced that Hakuhodo DY Holdings would go public on the Tokyo Stock Exchange in mid-February. The TSE is expected to approve the listing soon, and there is a high likelihood of being listed on the first section of the TSE. It is the first advertising giant to go public since Dentsu in November 2001, and the lead underwriter is Nikko Citigroup Securities. On January 17, the Tokyo Stock Exchange announced that it has approved the listing of Hakuhodo DY Holdings on February 16. The company is expected to be listed on the first section of the Tokyo Stock Exchange. The number of shares to be offered for sale is 4,198,300. On February 7, Hakuhodo DY Holdings announced that the offering price for its own shares in conjunction with its listing had been set at 6,500 yen. The company's shares were listed on the first section of the Tokyo Stock Exchange on February 16. The shares opened at 7,360 yen, exceeding the offering price. The company offered approximately 10% of its issued shares, or 4,198,300 shares, with a market capitalization of 252.5 billion yen based on the offering price.

In March 2006, it was announced that Hakuhodo DYM would participate in a capital investment along with other advertising companies such as ADK and Tokyu Agency in PresentCast, a new company established in April by Dentsu and the five Tokyo-based commercial broadcasters for the internet distribution of TV programs. PresentCast launched the TV program distribution site Dogatch in June 2006.

On April 26, 2006, Hakuhodo DY Holdings announced that Hirokazu Toda would be promoted from Managing Director to President, and Toshio Miyagawa would become Chairman with representative rights.

On June 15, 2006, Hakuhodo DY Holdings announced that it would relocate its headquarters from Higashi-Shinbashi in Minato, Tokyo to Akasaka, in Minato by the end of 2008. Hakuhodo would also move to the same building from Shibaura in the same ward.

On April 16, 2007, Hakuhodo DYM announced that they would acquire all the shares of Toshiba Entertainment, a wholly owned subsidiary of Toshiba engaged in the movie business, in May. Toshiba Entertainment changed its name to Showgate as of June 1, 2007.

On December 3, 2009, Hakuhodo DYM announced that they would open a new Chūbu branch office in Nagoya in April of the following year. The Nagoya branch offices of Hakuhodo, Daiko, and Yomiko Advertising would also move to the same building as the Hakuhodo DYM Chubu branch in May of the same year.

On October 27, 2010, Hakuhodo DYM announced that it had acquired a 20% stake in the advertising company Asahi Advertising with which they had cooperated in advertising transactions. Asahi Advertising bought back the shares held by its employees and sold them to Hakuhodo DYM on October 26. With this acquisition, Hakuhodo DYM became the second largest shareholder in Asahi Advertising, following Asahi Shimbun with a 30.5% stake.

On July 7, 2012, it was revealed that five subsidiaries of Hakuhodo DY Holdings, along with the holding company itself, were subjected to a tax investigation by the Tokyo Regional Taxation Bureau, and were found to have underreported approximately 1 billion yen in taxable income for the two years ending in March 2010. The six companies were charged a total of around 440 million yen, including additional taxes and penalties. According to Hakuhodo DY Holdings, the investigation found errors in the timing of recording expenses related to a computer system implemented by the holding company and its subsidiaries, as well as a mistake in the calculation of received dividend income. The tax bureau also determined that about 1 million yen of the timing errors constituted a fraudulent concealment of income, as the companies had instructed an external company to issue an invoice in March 2009 for work that had actually been completed the following month. While there were disagreements between the tax bureau and the company, the Hakuhodo DY Holdings IR department explained that they had followed the bureau's instructions.

On May 23, 2017, Hakuhodo DYM announced the establishment of a new company called Premium Platform Japan, together with TBS Holdings, TV Tokyo Holdings, Wowow, Nikkei and Dentsu, to provide video content for streaming services. The new company launched the video streaming service Paravi in April of the following year.

On November 16, 2020, the Tokyo Metropolitan Police Department arrested four individuals, including a former department head at Hakuhodo DYM, on suspicion of fraudulently obtaining cash by fictitiously ordering part of the production work for TV commercials and receiving payments from the company where they worked. According to the police, in November 2018, the four individuals ordered part of the production work to two other advertising companies in addition to the external advertising agency to which Hakuhodo DYM had ordered a TV commercial for a major corporation, and tricked the company into transferring a total of about 32 million yen to the two companies. It is suspected that they repeated fictitious orders dozens of times since May 2016, totaling about 700 million yen. According to Hakuhodo DYM, the suspect department head was dismissed for misconduct in a company internal investigation in September of last year. On May 31, 2021, the former department head defendant was sentenced to six years in prison (prosecution sought a sentence of seven years) by the Tokyo District Court for the charge of fraud.

On February 28, 2023, the Fair Trade Commission announced that Hakuhodo, along with six other companies including Dentsu and Tokyu Agency, had been charged with violating the Antimonopoly Act (unfair restraint of trade) by pre-determining the winning companies for the management of test and main games ordered by the Tokyo Organising Committee of the Olympic and Paralympic Games between February and July 2018. Additionally, Kenichiro Yokomizo, the former head of Hakuhodo DYM' Sports Business Bureau, was individually indicted.
