= Risako =

- Gender: Female

Origin
- Origin: Japanese
- Meaning: Different meanings depending on the kanji used

Risako (written: 梨紗子, 梨沙子 or 理紗子) is a feminine Japanese given name. Notable people with the name include:

- Risako Itō (伊藤 梨沙子; born 1996), Japanese actress, model and gravure idol
- Risako Kawai (川井 梨紗子; born 1994), Japanese sport wrestler
- Risako Mitsui (三井 梨紗子; born 1993), Japanese synchronized swimmer
- Risako Oga (大賀 理紗子; born 1997), Japanese women's footballer
- Risako Sugaya (菅谷 梨沙子; born 1994), Japanese singer and idol
