= Hakuhodo DY Music & Pictures =

Japanese production company and distributor

Hakuhodo DY Music & Pictures Inc.
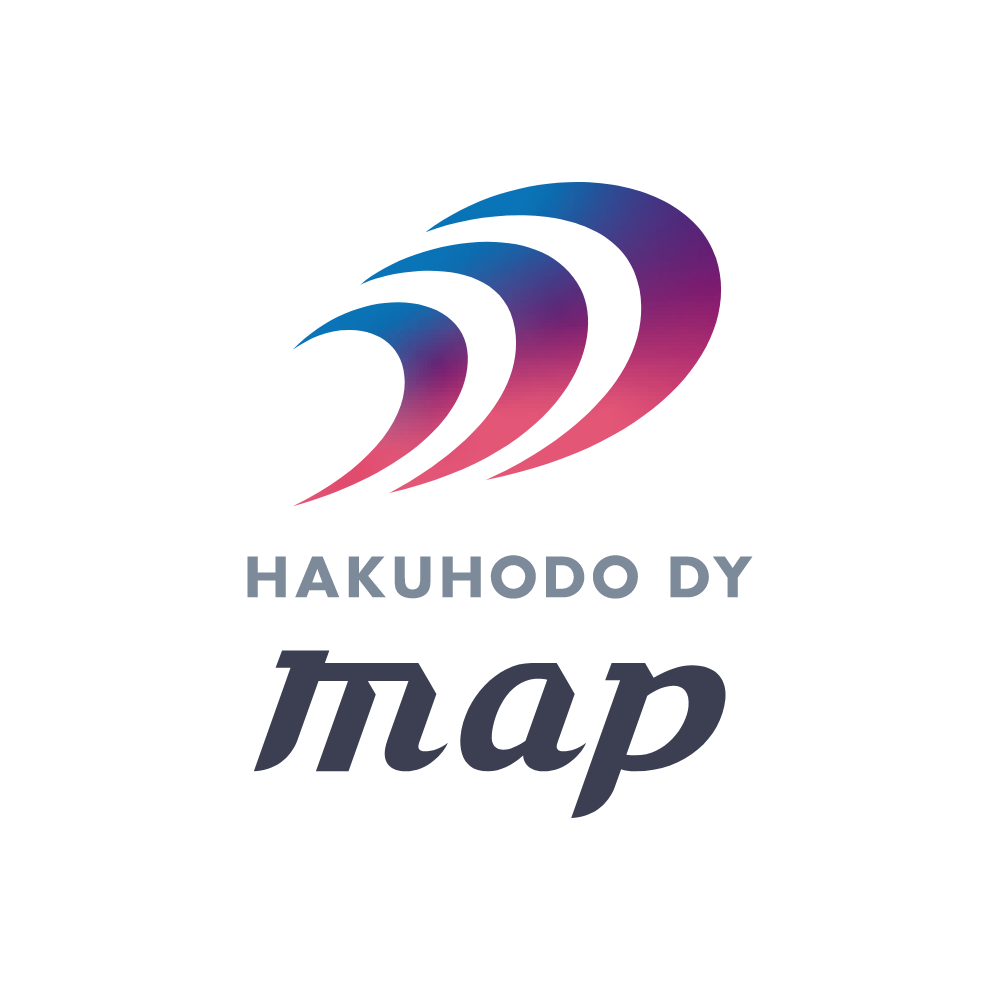

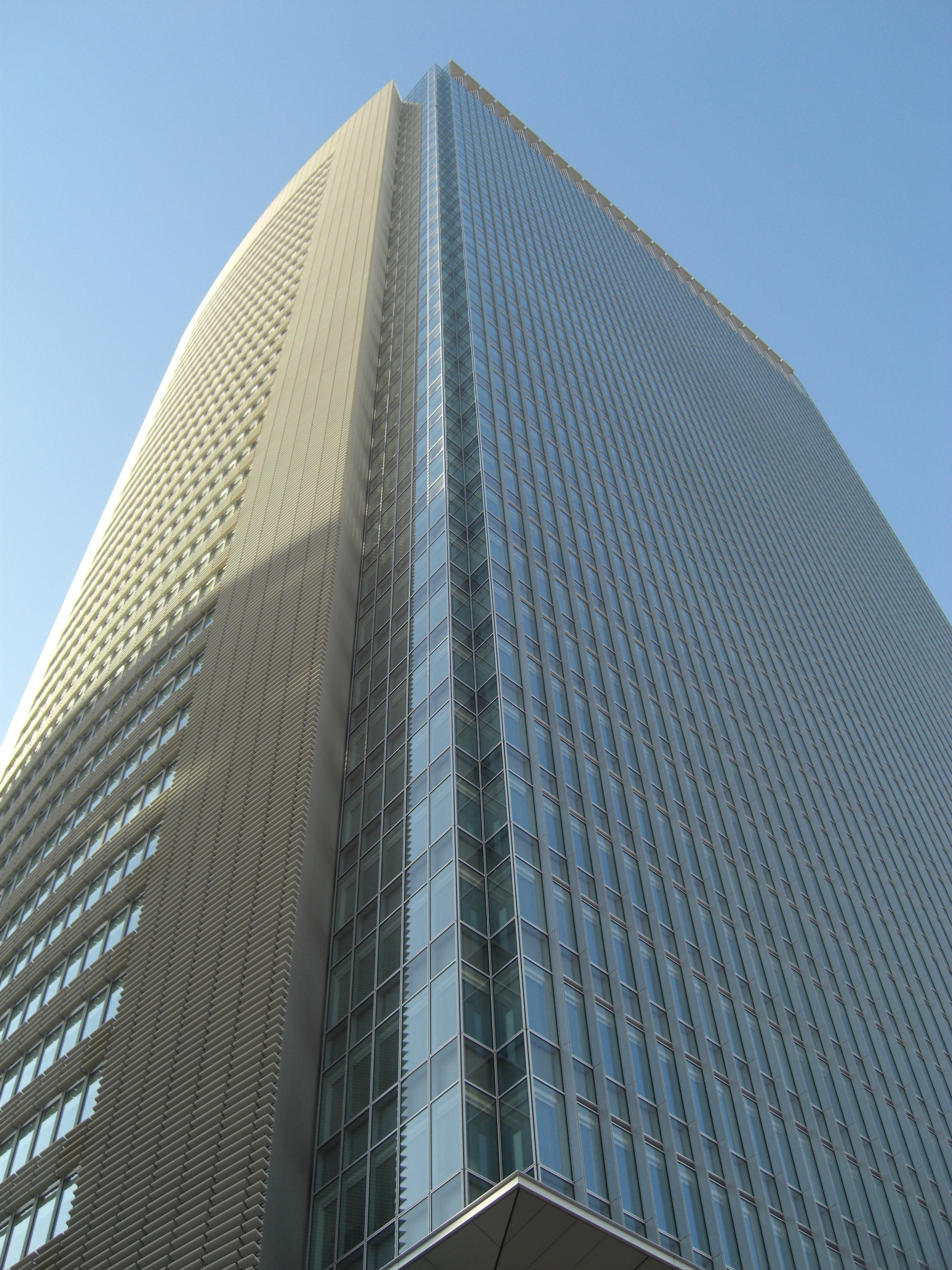
- Headquarters in Minato, Tokyo
- Native name: 株式会社博報堂DYミュージック&ピクチャーズ
- Romanized name: Kabushiki-gaisha Hakuhōdō DY myūjikku & pikuchāzu
- Formerly: Amuse Video, Inc. (1990-2000); Amuse Pictures, Inc. (2000-2003); Toshiba Entertainment Inc. (2003-2007); Showgate, Inc. (2007-2015)
- Type: Kabushiki gaisha
- Industry: Entertainment
- Founded: October 16, 1990; 36 years ago
- Headquarters: Akasaka, Minato, Tokyo, Japan
- Area served: Japan
- Key people: Yoshikuni Murata (President)
- Services: Production and distribution of films and series
- Parent: Hakuhodo
- Website: hakuhodody-map.jp

Hakuhodo DY Music & Pictures Inc. (株式会社博報堂DYミュージック&ピクチャーズ), formerly and still commonly known as Showgate Inc. (株式会社ショウゲート), is a Japanese entertainment company. It is a subsidiary of Hakuhodo, a subsidiary of Hakuhodo DY Holdings. The company engages in the domestic acquisition of foreign films and dramas in Japan, as well as the production and distribution of anime and movies.

The company was established as Amuse Video by the entertainment agency Amuse. It was later renamed Amuse Pictures, then became a subsidiary of Toshiba and was known as Toshiba Entertainment. Finally, as a subsidiary of Hakuhodo DY Media Partners, it became Showgate and is now Hakuhodo DY Music & Pictures.

== Works ==
- CB Chara Go Nagai World (1990)
- Burn Up (1991)
- Giant Robo: The Day the Earth Stood Still (1992)
  - GinRei Specials (1994-1995)
- Street Fighter II V (1996)
- Those Who Hunt Elves (1996)
- Night Warriors: Darkstalkers' Revenge (1997)
- Ninja Resurrection (1998)
- Getter Robo Armageddon (1998)
- Shin Getter Robo vs Neo Getter Robo (2000)
- Mazinkaiser (2001)
- Mazinkaiser vs. The Great General of Darkness (2003)
- New Getter Robo (2004)
- Burn Up Scramble (2004)
- Destiny of the Shrine Maiden (2004)
- Grenadier (2004)
- Ninja Nonsense (2004)
- Final Approach (2004)
- W Wish (2004)
- Embracing Love (2004)
- Uta Kata (2004)
- Elemental Gelade (2005)
- Moeyo Ken TV (2005)
- Eureka Seven (2005)
- Demon Prince Enma (2006)
- Shakugan no Shana II (2007-2008)
- Gake no Ue no Ponyo (2008)
- Hyakka Ryōran (2010)
- Usagi Drop (2011)
- Black Bullet (2014)
- The Comic Artist and His Assistants (2014)
- Daimidaler Prince vs. Penguin Empire (2014)
- Is the Order a Rabbit? (2014)
- Kamigami no Asobi (2014)
- Selector Infected Wixoss (2014)
- Suisei no Gargantia: Meguru Kōro, Haruka (2014)
- Girls und Panzer der Film (2015)
- World of Delight (2015)
- Mars ~Tada, Kimi wo Aishiteru! (2016)
- Ankoku Joshi (2017)
- Maquia: When the Promised Flower Blooms (2018)
- Mirrorliar Films (2021-24)
- Aimitagai (2024)
