= Dina Triyoso =

American materials scientist

Dina H. Triyoso is an American materials scientist, and an expert on high-κ dielectrics and their applications in semiconductor-based electronics, and more generally on materials and processes for electronic devices. She works for Tokyo Electron (TEL), in New York.

Triyoso was a student of chemical engineering at Texas A&M University, where she received her Ph.D. in 2000, advised by Cellular engineer Theresa Good. She worked for Motorola Semiconductor Products and its spin-off Freescale Semiconductor, and then for GlobalFoundries, before taking her present position at Tokyo Electron in 2019.

She was named to the 2025 class of IEEE Fellows "for contributions to high-k metal gate complementary metal-oxide-semiconductor technology".
