= High Kick Angels =

- Film poster
- Directed by: Kazuhiro Yokoyama
- Written by: Fuyuhiko Nishi
- Starring: Kanon Miyahara; Risako Itō; Mayu Kawamoto; Hirona Nagashima; Kaede Aono; Ryu Nakatani; Nana Shirai; Chisato Morishita; Shingo Koyasu
- Release date: June 14, 2014
- Running time: 90 minutes
- Country: Japan
- Language: Japanese

High Kick Angels (ハイキック・エンジェルス) is a 2014 Japanese martial arts film directed by Kazuhiro Yokoyama.

== Cast ==
- Kanon Miyahara as Sakura Yamanami
- Risako Itō as Fuyumi Igarashi
- Mayu Kawamoto as Asuka Gondo
- Hirona Nagashima as Miku
- Kaede Aono as Maki Akagi
- Ryu Nakatani as Teacher Tanaka
- Chisato Morishita as J Rose
- Nana Shirai as Fuega/J Kid
- Shingo Koyasu as Owashi
