= Hikawa Shrine =

Hikawa Shrine may refer to:

- Hikawa Shrine (Saitama), the main Shinto shrine in Saitama Prefecture, which has several branch shrines, including:
  - Hikawa Shrine (Akasaka), in Akasaka, Minato, Tokyo
  - Hikawa Shrine (Kawagoe)
