= Long Long Man =

Japanese television advertisement series

- Long Long Man crashes Chi-chan and Tooru-san's wedding
- Agency: Hakuhodo
- Client: UHA Mikakuto Co. Ltd.
- Language: Japanese
- Running time: 0:30
- Product: Sakeru Gummy
- Release date: 2017
- Directed by: Mitsuaki Imura
- Starring: Risako Itō; Seiji Suzuki; Yukiyoshi Ozawa
- Country: Japan

Sakeru Gummy vs. Long Sakeru Gummy (さけるグミVSなが～いさけるグミ, Sakeru Gumi tai Nagāi Sakeru Gumi), commonly known as Long Long Man, is a 2017 series of television commercials produced in Japan by Hakuhodo for UHA Mikakuto Co. Ltd., the manufacturer of Sakeru Gummy and Long Sakeru Gummy. The 11-part series of commercials follow a couple that loves Sakeru Gummy and their conflict with a mysterious man who eats a longer version of the candy.

== Plot ==
Chi-chan and Tooru-san love Sakeru Gummy, but one day, they see "Long Long Man", a mysterious mustached man tearing off a strip of Long Sakeru Gummy as seductive jazz music plays in the background. From that day, Chi-chan becomes obsessed with Long Long Man and anything of great length. Her relationship with Tooru-san is strained when he discovers a pack of Long Sakeru Gummy in her apartment, and he concludes Chi-chan has been cheating on him with Long Long Man. During their argument, Chi-chan passes out and lies to Tooru-san that she has a short life, and looking at long things relieves her of her worries. When Chi-chan's friend explains that regular Sakeru Gummy is simply Long Sakeru Gummy cut into smaller bites, Chi-chan reconciles with Tooru-san, despite her persistent obsession with Long Long Man. On the day of their wedding, they once again encounter Long Long Man, and Chi-chan tries to leave Tooru-san for him, only for Long Long Man to reveal that he was in love with Tooru-san all along.

== Cast ==
- Risako Itō as Chi-chan (ちーちゃん, Chī-chan)
- Seiji Suzuki as Tooru-san (トオルさん)
- Yukiyoshi Ozawa as Long Long Man (長い男, Nagai Otoko)

== Episodes ==
1. Date (デート, Dēto)
2. Zoo (動物園, Dōbutsuen)
3. Bike Courier (バイク便, Baiku-bin)
4. Entrance (玄関, Genkan)
5. Jealousy (嫉妬, Shitto)
6. Secret (秘密, Himitsu)
7. Lie (嘘, Uso)
8. Proposal (プロポーズ, Puropōzu)
9. Taxi (タクシー, Takushī)
10. Long Long Limousine: The Bride's Real Intention (ロングロングリムジン ～花嫁の本音～, Rongu Rongu Rimujin: Hanayome no Hon'ne)
11. True Love (さける2人 ～愛について～, Sakeru Futari: Ai ni Tsuite; lit. "Two Sakerus: About Love")

== Awards ==
The commercial series won the Silver Lion at the 2018 Cannes Lions International Festival of Creativity, the Bronze Award at the 2019 AdFest, the ACC Grand Prix, Minister of Internal Affairs and Communications Award at ACC Tokyo Creativity Awards 2018, and the 2018 TCC Advertising Award Grand Prix.
