= Akasaka Biz Tower =

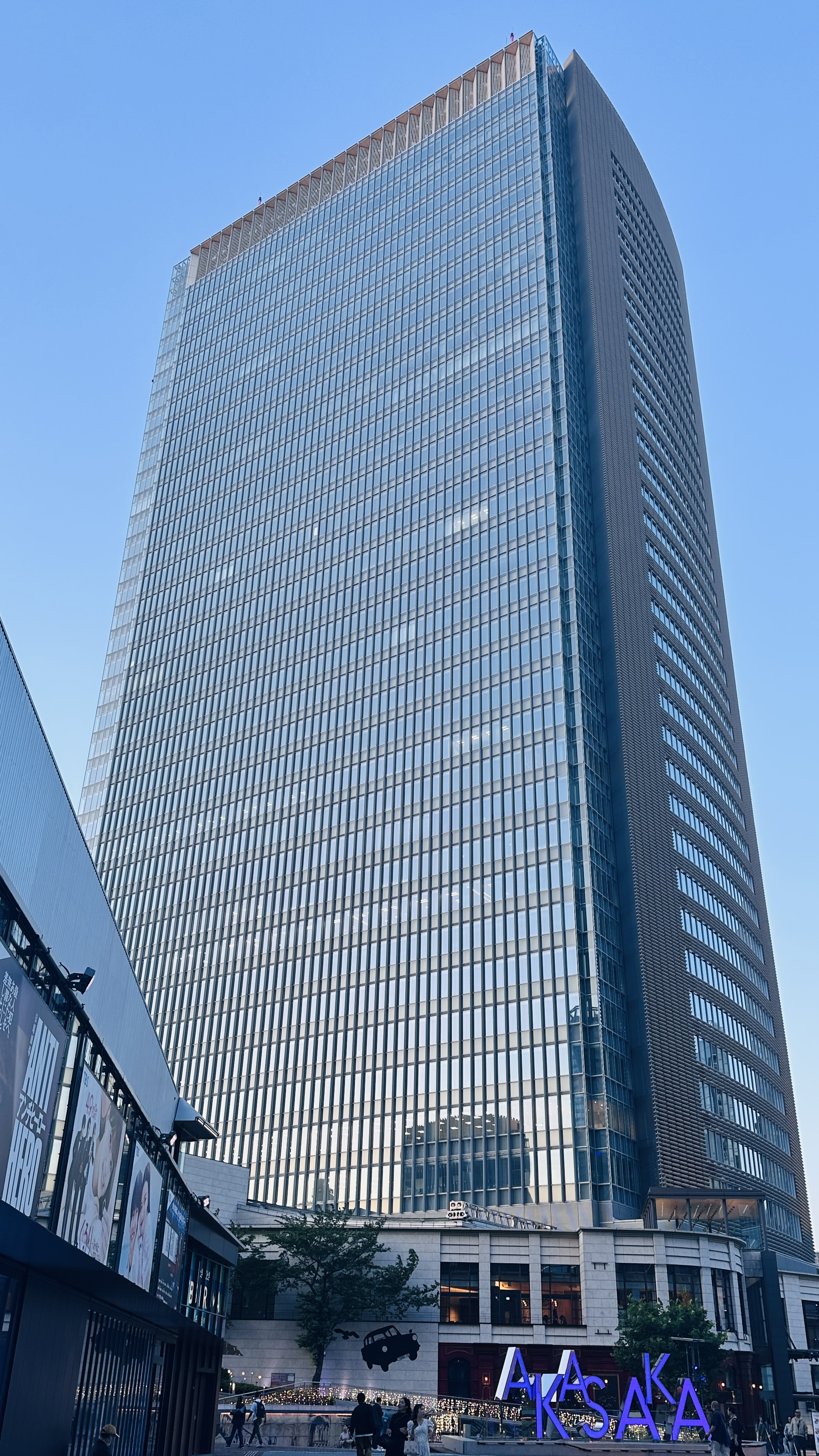
- Interactive map of the Akasaka Biz Tower area

General information
- Status: Completed
- Type: Offices, shops
- Location: Akasaka, Minato, Tokyo, Japan
- Coordinates: 35.673329°N 139.736611°E
- Construction started: 2005
- Completed: 2008

Height
- Roof: 179.3 m (588 ft)
- Top floor: 39

Technical details
- Floor count: 42 (39 above ground, 3 underground)
- Floor area: 187,194 m^{2} (2,014,940 sq ft)

The Akasaka Biz Tower (赤坂Bizタワー) is a skyscraper located in Akasaka, Tokyo, Japan.

The super high-rise is a result of the "Akasaka 5-chome TBS Development Project" into the Akasaka Sacas (赤坂サカス) complex together with the TBS Broadcasting Center, the Akasaka Blitz music venue, and the Akasaka ACT Theater. It is home to the headquarters of Hakuhodo, Inpex and Tokyo Electron.
