= Shiawase no Jikan =

Japanese manga series

- Cover of the first manga volume

幸せの時間
- Manga
- Written by: Yasuyuki Kunitomo
- Published by: Futabasha
- Imprint: Action Comics
- Magazine: Manga Action
- Original run: 1997 – 2001
- Television drama
- Studio: Tōkai Television Broadcasting
- Original network: FNS (THK, Fuji TV)
- Original run: 5 November 2012 – December 2012

Shiawase no Jikan (Japanese: 幸せの時間; lit. "A Happy Time") is a Japanese manga series written and illustrated by Yasuyuki Kunitomo. It was adapted into a Japanese television drama series in 2012.

== Characters ==
- Chieko Asakura (Minako Tanaka)
- Katsuhiko Asakura (Kazuhiko Nishimura)
- Yōko Takamura (Megumi Kagurazaka)
- Yōsuke (Taiko Katono)
- Kaori (Risako Itō)
