= Akasaka Sacas =

Commercial complex in Japan

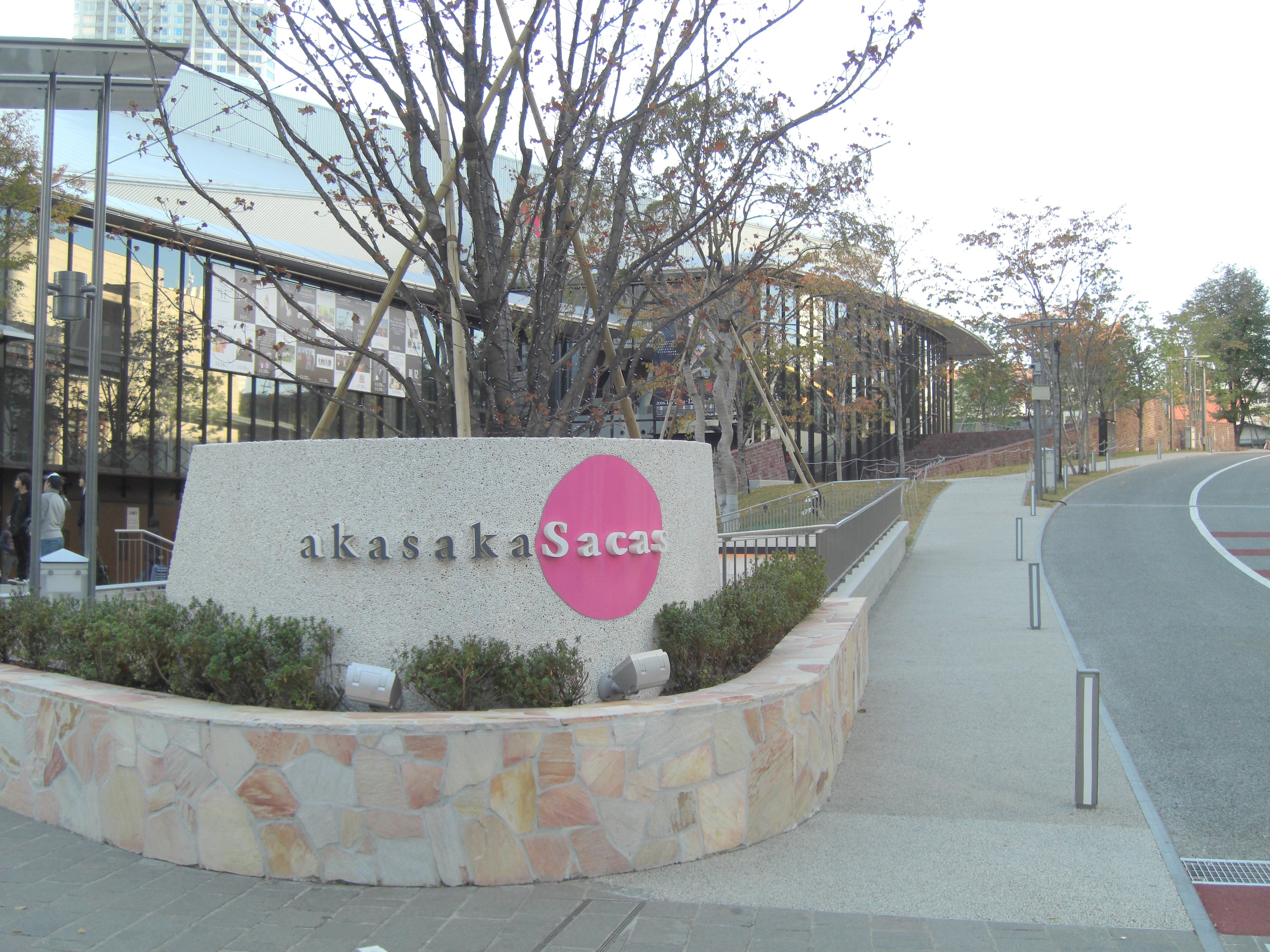
akasaka Sacas

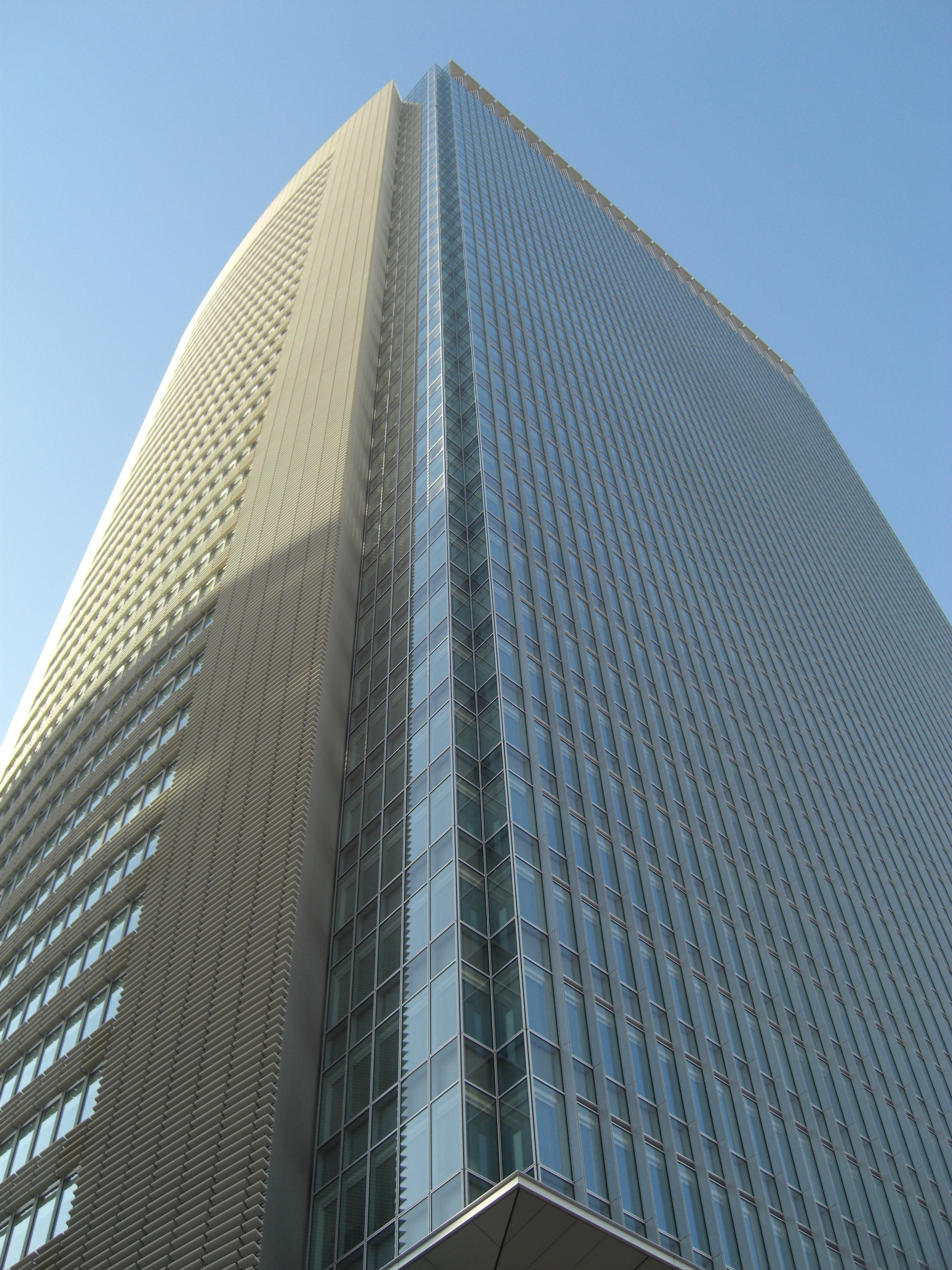
Akasaka Biz Tower

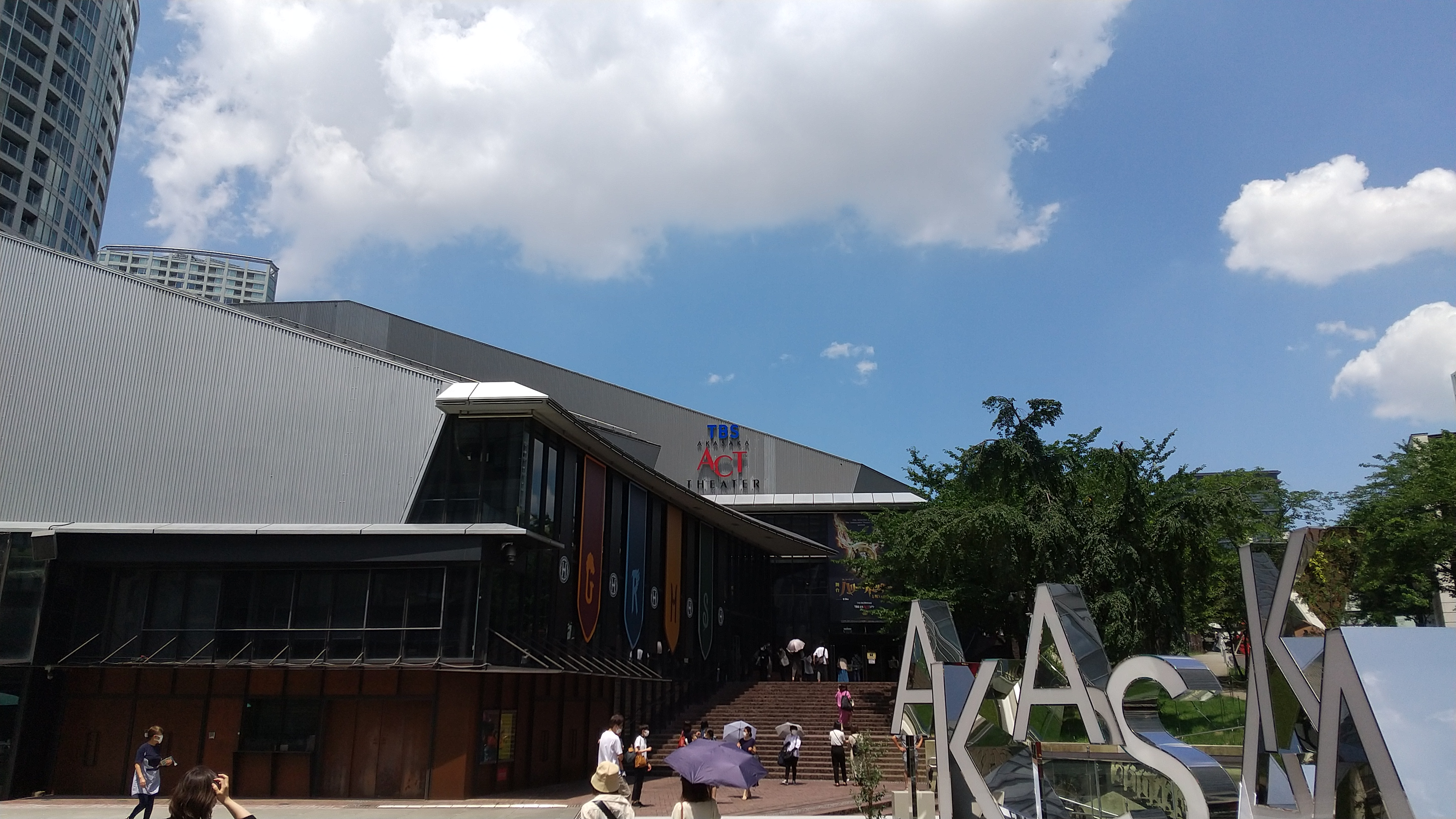
TBS Akasaka Act Theatre

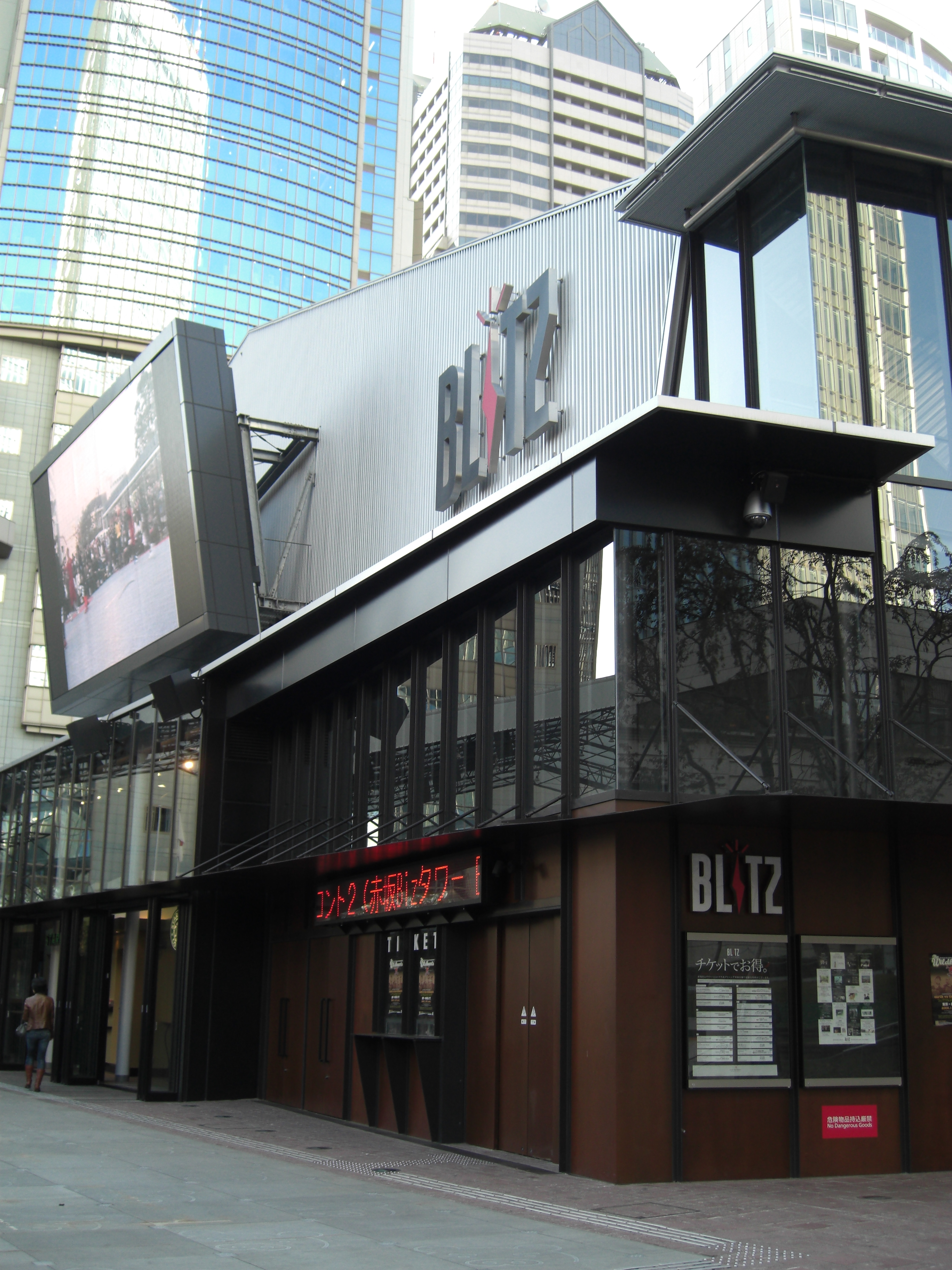
Akasaka Blitz

akasaka Sacas (赤坂サカス, Akasaka Sakasu) is a commercial complex in Akasaka, Tokyo, Japan, where the TBS Broadcasting Center and the site of the "Akasaka 5-chome TBS Development Project" stand.

== Overview ==
Construction began in February 2005 and the buildings were completed in January 2008. akasaka Sacas was opened on March 20, 2008, following Akasaka Biz Tower Shops&Dining. It was created for the recreation of the area around the TBS station. Following the creation of TBS Broadcasting Center in 1994, the akasaka Sacas project was finally completed after 17 years for the 40th anniversary in 1991. "Sacas Opening Fes" was held from March 20 until April 4, 2008.

== Facilities and buildings ==
- TBS Broadcasting Center

  - the headquarters of Tokyo Broadcasting System Holdings, Inc. (TBS HD)
  - the headquarters and studio of Tokyo Broadcasting System Television, Inc. (TBS)
  - the headquarters and studio of TBS Radio & Communications, Inc. (TBS Radio)
  - the headquarters and studio of BS-TBS, Inc.
  - the headquarters and studio of C-TBS, Inc.
- Sacas Hiroba (Sacas広場)
- Akasaka Biz Tower 35°40′24″N 139°44′12″E
  - the headquarters of Hakuhodo DY Group Companies (Hakuhodo DY Holdings, Inc., Hakuhodo, Inc., Hakuhodo DY Media Partners, Inc.)
  - the Akasaka headquarters of Universal Music Japan (once the headquarters of EMI Music Japan until 2013)
  - Mainichi Broadcasting System, Inc. Tokyo Branch Office
  - the headquarters of Tokyo Electron Limited
  - SMT Tokyo restaurant by Ikyu Group
  - Akasaka Biz Tower Shops&Dining
- Akasaka BLITZ (operated by Tokyo Broadcasting System Television, Inc.)
- TBS Akasaka ACT Theater (operated by Tokyo Broadcasting System Television, Inc.)
- Akasaka The Residence

== See also ==
- Roppongi Hills
- Omotesando Hills
