= Hikawa Shrine (Akasaka) =

Shinto shrine in Japan

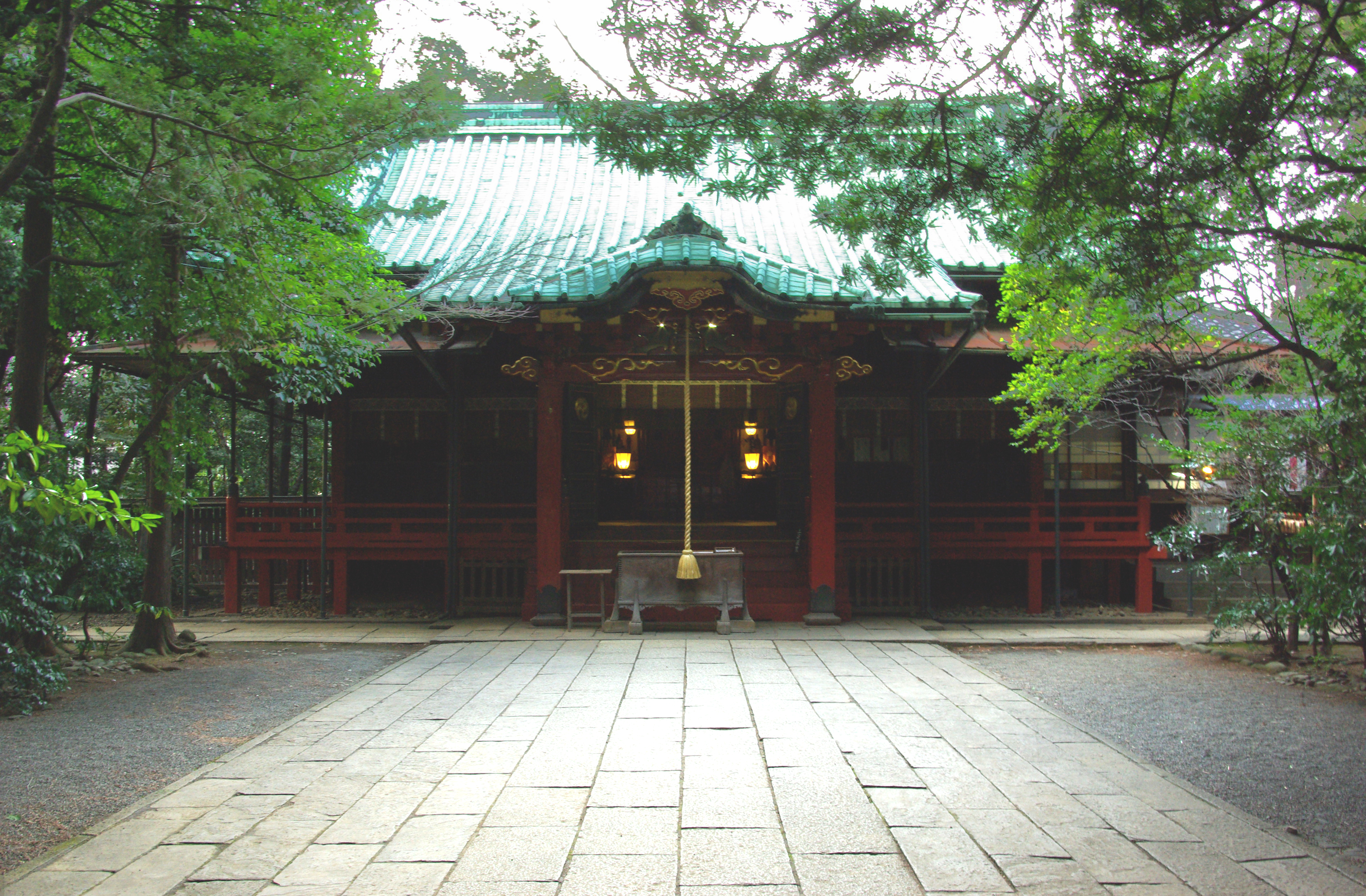

- Location within Japan

Religion
- Affiliation: Shinto

Location
- Location: 6-10-12, Akasaka, Minato, Tokyo 107-0052
- Coordinates: 35°40′5.57″N 139°44′8″E

Architecture
- Founder: Tokugawa Yoshimune
- Established: 1730

Website
- www.akasakahikawa.or.jp

Hikawa Shrine (氷川神社, Hikawa-jinja) is a Shinto shrine in Akasaka, Tokyo, Japan. In Tokyo, it is the best known of the 59 branch shrines of the Hikawa-jinja, which was designated as the chief Shinto shrine (ichinomiya) for the former Musashi Province.

== History ==
The shrine structures were constructed in 1730 under the patronage of Tokugawa Yoshimune. This became Yoshimune's personal shrine.

== Notes ==
Hikawa Shrine, 2021
