= Hakuhodo =

Japanese advertising and holding company

Hakuhodo Inc.
- Logo used since 2026

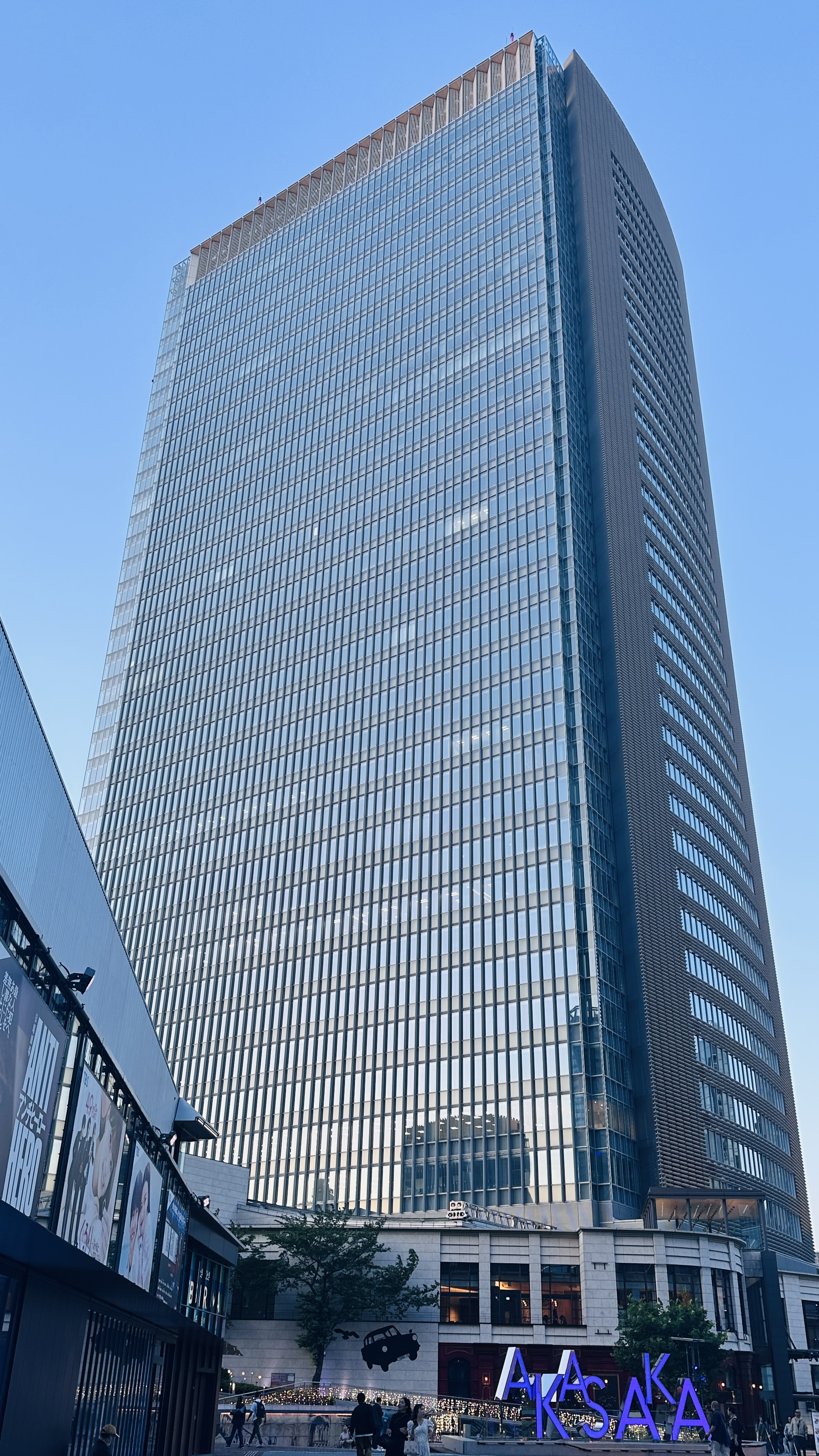
- Hakuhodo's headquarters in Minato, Tokyo
- Native name: 株式会社博報堂
- Romanized name: Kabushiki gaisha Hakuhōdō
- Type: Subsidiary
- Industry: Advertising; Public relations
- Founded: October 6, 1895; 130 years ago
- Founder: Hironao Seki
- Headquarters: Akasaka Biz Tower, 3-1, Akasaka, Minato, Tokyo, Japan
- Key people: Junji Narita: Chairman & CEO, Kirokazu Toda: President & CEO
- Products: Branding & identity Consumer insights Design; Digital; Marketing; Market research Media planning and buying Public relations Relationship marketing
- Number of employees: 3,107 (2011)
- Parent: Hakuhodo DY Holdings
- Subsidiaries: Hakuhodo DY Music & Pictures
- Website: https://www.hakuhodo.co.jp/

Hakuhodo Inc. (株式会社博報堂, Kabushiki-gaisha Hakuhōdō) is a Japanese advertising and public relations company owned by Hakuhodo DY Holdings. It is headquartered at Akasaka Biz Tower in Akasaka, Minato, Tokyo.

== History ==
Hakuhodo is one of the oldest advertising agencies in Japan and was founded by Hironao Seki at Nihonbashi-Honshiroganecho, Tokyo, as an advertising space broker and wholesale distributor for educational magazines in October 1895.

In 1910 the company broke from its obscurity by contracting to place front-page newspaper ads.

Their growth over the next few decades came from:

- 1937 to 1944: grew by absorbing other agencies.
- 1951: they created a radio advertising department
- 1953: a TV group.

In 1996, Hakuhodo cofounded the DAC Consortium, a consolidated group of Japanese global media players investing in digital innovation.

In 2000, Hakuhodo created the joint-venture Hakuhodo-Percept with the Indian agency Percept to target the Indian advertising market. In December 2002, Hakuhodo launched the first advertising campaign where the Beckhams appeared together (displayed on billboard screens in Tokyo).

In October 2003 the company became part of the Hakuhodo DY Holdings after merging with other companies. Hakuhodo DY Holdings launched a unique media and entertainment company, Hakuhodo DY Media Partners Inc., in 2003. In February 2009, Hakuhodo announced a partnership with US global public relations firm Ketchum.

Hakuhodo acquired the US-based companies SYPartners LLC and Red Peak Group LLC in May 2014, the US-based marketing company Digital Kitchen in June 2015, the Montreal-based creative agency Sid Lee in July 2015, and the Singapore-based agency Integrated Communications Group (ICG) in February 2017. The Japanese company purchased 30% of Palo Alto–based IDEO in February 2016.

On 28 February 2023 prosecutors formally indicted Hakuhodo, rival ad agency Dentsu, and four other companies on suspicion of bid rigging of contracts worth approximately ¥43.7 billion for the 2020 Summer Olympics. They were accused of lowering the competitiveness of their tenders. Dentsu had admitted to liability in voluntary questioning a few days earlier. The companies allegedly colluded with Yasuo Mori, a former senior Olympic official, who was arrested along with other suspects.

On April 1, 2025, Hakuhodo and Hakuhodo DY Media Partners underwent an absorption-type company split, with Hakuhodo serving as the successor company.

== Description ==
Hakuhodo has a large international footprint with offices in many major cities across Asia, Europe & the Americas In Japan and in offices around the world.

== Awards and recognition ==
- 1993: Grand Prix at the Cannes Lions International Festival of Creativity for Hungry? (client: Cup Noodles)
- 2007: Silver Lion at the Cannes Lions International Festival of Creativity for Humanity (client: Toyota)
- 2018: Silver Lion at the Cannes Lions International Festival of Creativity for Long Long Man (client: UHA Mikakuto)
