= EMI Music Japan =

Japanese record company (2007–2013)

EMI Music Japan Inc.

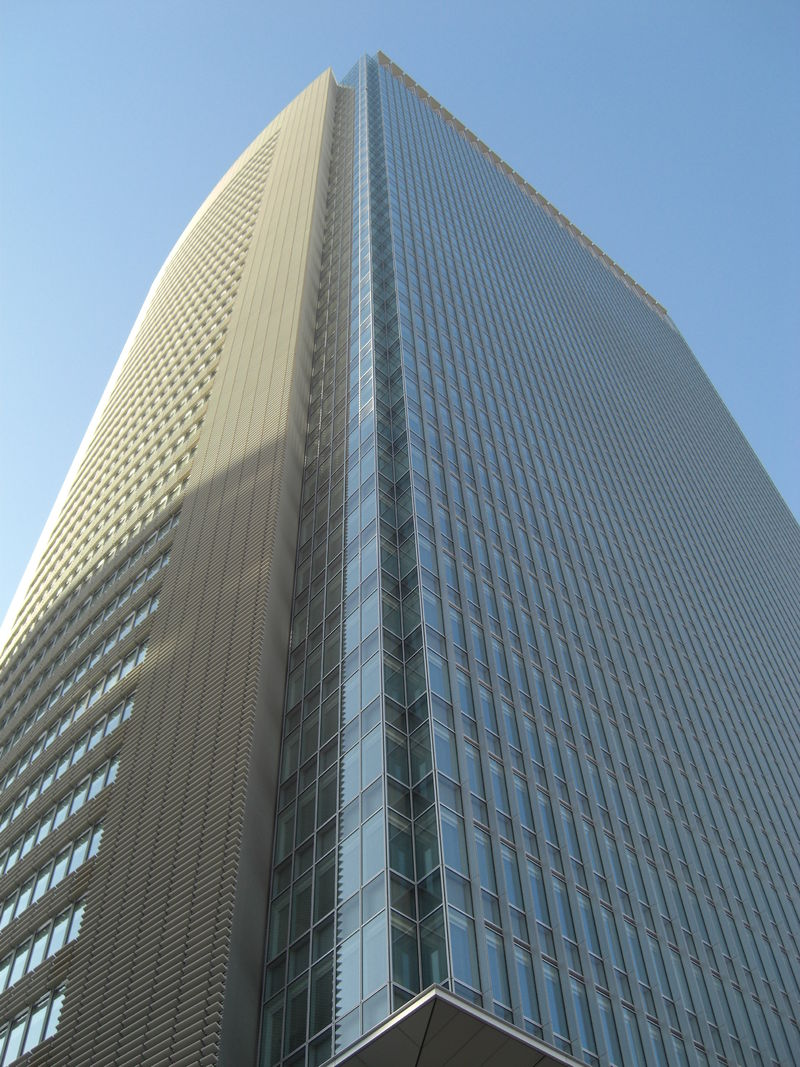
- Akasaka Biz Tower where the company was headquartered
- Native name: 株式会社EMIミュージック・ジャパン
- Formerly: Toshiba Musical Industries (1960–1973); Toshiba EMI (1973–2007)
- Company type: Subsidiary
- Industry: Music
- Founded: October 1, 1960 in Tokyo, Japan
- Defunct: April 1, 2013 (as a company)
- Fate: Dissolved; carried into Universal Music Japan
- Successor: EMI Records Japan
- Headquarters: Akasaka Biz Tower, 3-1, Akasaka Gochome, Minato, Tokyo, Japan
- Key people: Kazuhiko Koike: President and CEO; Junya Nakasone: Senior Managing Director; Hitoshi Namekata: Managing Director
- Revenue: see Universal Music Group
- Number of employees: 327
- Parent: Toshiba (1960–2007); EMI (2007–2012); Universal Music Group (2012–2013)
- Website: "http://emimusic.jp/". Archived from the original on 2012-09-30.

EMI Music Japan Inc. (Japanese: 株式会社EMIミュージック・ジャパン, Hepburn: Kabushiki-gaisha EMI Music Japan), formerly Toshiba EMI (東芝イーエムアイ株式会社, Tōshiba EMI Kabushiki-gaisha), was one of Japan's leading music companies. It became a wholly owned subsidiary of British music company EMI Group Ltd. on June 30, 2007, after Toshiba sold off its previous 45% stake. Its CEO and president was Kazuhiko Koike. When EMI Music Japan was trading as Toshiba-EMI, it was involved with the production of anime. On April 1, 2013, the company became defunct, following its absorption into Universal Music Japan as a sublabel under the name EMI Records Japan.

== History ==
The company was founded on October 1, 1960, as Toshiba Musical Industries (東芝音楽工業株式会社, Tōshiba Ongaku Kōgyō Kabushiki Kaisha). From 1962, it licensed Columbia (UK) titles for release in Japan. After an injection of capital by Capitol EMI, EMI acquired 50% of the company in October 1973, and the name was changed to Toshiba EMI Limited. On October 3, 1994, the equity ratio of the company was changed, in which EMI obtained 55% with Toshiba owning the remaining 45%. On June 30, 2007, Toshiba Corporation sold the remaining 45% stake in the company to EMI, giving EMI full ownership of the company. The name was then changed to EMI Music Japan, reflecting Toshiba's divestiture from the business. In 2012, EMI Music Japan and Universal Music Group's Japanese branch was scheduled to hold a corporate swap in response to the merger by January 15, 2013, with Kazuhiko Koike serving as EMIJ's president. On April 1, 2013, EMI Music Japan was officially absorbed into Universal Music Japan, became defunct as a company and was renamed to EMI Records Japan. The label continued to use the TOCT catalog code until October 2013, when it started to use the TYCT catalog code. The official website was shut down as of October 23, 2013.

After the dissolution and absorption, some of the former EMI staff and executives have been into different companies away from Universal Music. Then-executive producer San-e Ichii was named the managing director of Japan Content Expansion Department. Kazuhiko Koike (also former CEO of Universal Music Japan) has stepped down from his position as CEO by the end of 2013, nine months after the merger, and became non-executive chairman by the beginning of 2014. He was replaced by Naoshi Fujikura.

=== Advertising slogan ===
EMI Music Japan's present slogan is "Music for all, All for music".

== Labels ==
- Awake Sounds
- EMI Records (Japan)
  - Apple Records
  - Capitol Records
    - Capitol Music (Japan)
  - Virgin Records
    - Virgin Music (Japan) - not to be confused with Media Remoras, a Pony Canyon label formerly known as "Virgin Japan"
- Eastworld
- Express
- Foozay Music
- i-Dance
- Reservotion Records
- SakuraStar Records
- SoundTown (EMI Strategic Marketing)
- Suite Supuesto!
- TM Factory
- Unlimited Records

== See also ==
- List of record labels
- Youmex
