= Naaboudoufu@nana =

naaboudoufu@nana
- Also known as: Nābō, Nana
- Born: Nana Shirai (前田 希美); June 17, 1994 (age 32); Tokyo, Japan
- Genres: J-pop
- Occupations: Singer; model
- Years active: 2011–2020
- Label: King Records
- Website: www.naaboudoufu.com

Nana Shirai (白井 那奈, Shirai Nana), better known under her stage name Nābō Dōfu @ Nana or naaboudoufu@nana (なあ坊豆腐@那奈, Nābōdōfu atto Nana; "@" is pronounced as "at") is a Japanese former actress and model. She was a member of the idol duo Nananon (ななのん) (with actress and model Nozomi Maeda).

She resigned from show business on June 14, 2020, citing accusations of slander, sexual crimes, and escape with salary as the reason.

== Discography ==
=== Singles ===
No.	Title	Release date	Charts
No.	Title	Release date	JPN Oricon
1	"Kunekune Bravo!!" (クネクネ☆ブラボー!!)	May 23, 2012	43
2	"Magical Lip Kiss" (マジカルリップKISS)	November 7, 2012	59
—	"Nananananonnon" (ななななのんのん) (with Nozomi Maeda, under the group name of Nananon)	August 12, 2014	60
—	"Rock Nananon / Android1617" (ROCK NANANON/Android1617) (with Nozomi Maeda, under the group name of Nananon)	March 24, 2015	19

Note: "Kunekune Bravo!!" and "Magical Lip Kiss" were released on King Records, "Nananananonnon" and "Rock Nananon / Android1617" on Tsubasa Records.

=== DVD ===
- Nābō Tōfu @ 7chan neru (なあ坊豆腐@7ちゃんねる) (25 May 2013, Wani Books)

=== Music videos ===
Year	Title
2012	"Kunekune Bravo!!"
2012	"Zunzun Yume Kaikaku"
2012	"Magical Lip Kiss"
2014	"Nananananonnon" (by Nananon)
2015	"Nananon no Baby Portable Rock" (by Nananon)
2015	"Rock Nanananon" (by Nananon)

== Bibliography ==
=== Photobooks ===
- Nābō Doll @ Nana (なあ坊DOLL@那奈) (27 February 2013, Wani Books)

== Filmography ==
=== TV dramas ===
- Toshi Densetsu no Onna (都市伝説の女) (Episode 5, 8 November 2013, TV Asahi) – in the role of Reiko Shimizu

=== Movies ===
- Sadako 3D
- Kane ga Narishi, Shōjotachi wa Jū o Utsu (鐘が鳴りし、少女達は銃を撃つ) (2014, Alice in Project)– a film shown at the Yubari International Fantastic Film Festival
- High Kick Angels (ハイキックエンジェルス)
