= Tokyo Electron =

Japanese semiconductor equipment manufacturer

Tokyo Electron Limited

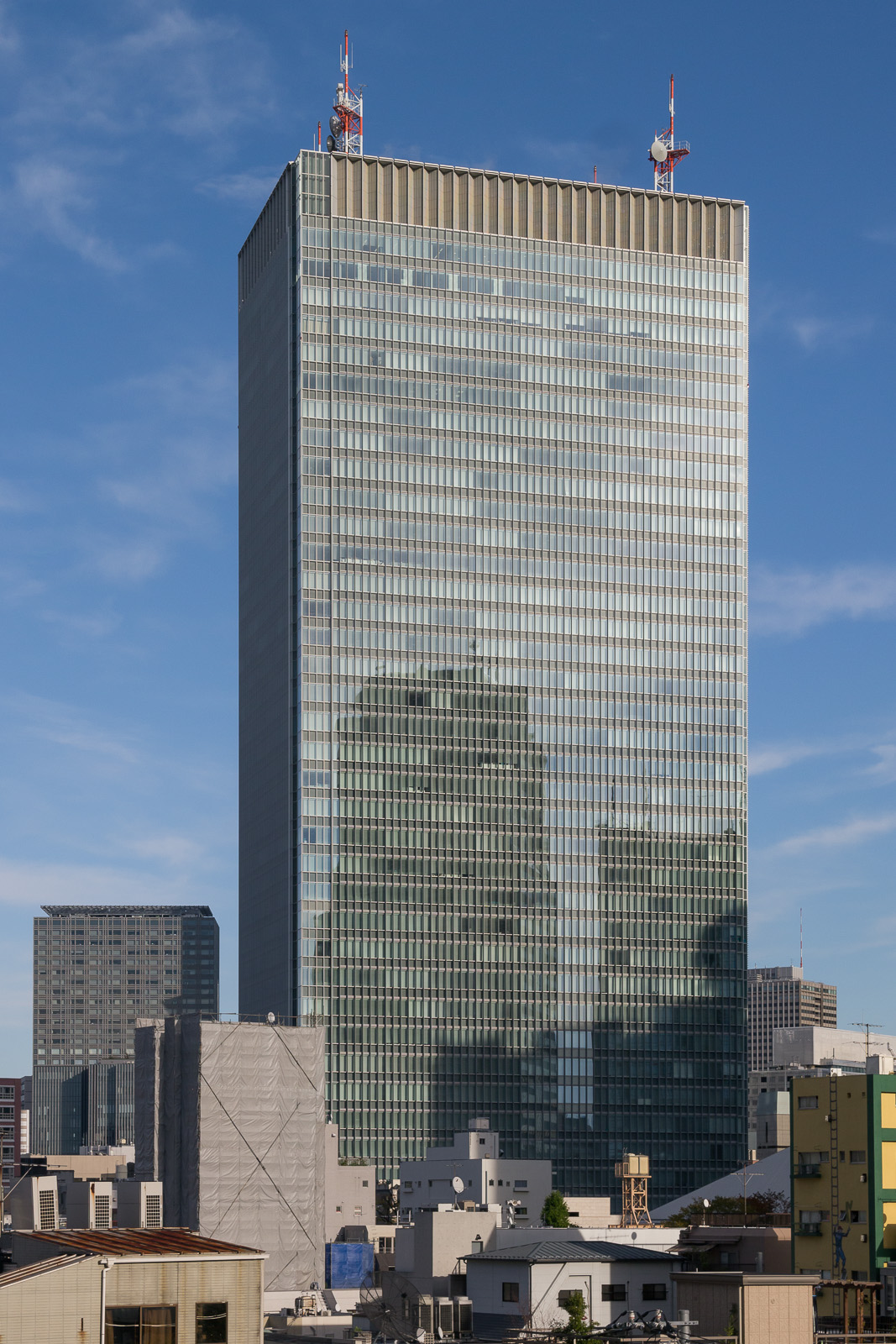
- Akasaka Biz Tower
- Native name: 東京エレクトロン株式会社
- Romanized name: Tōkyō Erekutoron kabushiki gaisha
- Formerly: Tokyo Electron Laboratories, Inc. (1963–1978)
- Type: Public
- Traded as: TYO: 8035; Nikkei 225 component; TOPIX Core 30 component
- Industry: Electronics; Semiconductors
- Predecessor: Sakura Yoko KK founded on April 6, 1951
- Founded: November 11, 1963; 62 years ago (as Tokyo Electron Laboratories, Inc.)
- Founder: Tokuo Kub, Toshio Kodaka, Tokyo Broadcasting System, Inc.
- Headquarters: Akasaka Biz Tower, Minato-ku, Tokyo, Japan
- Area served: Japan, Taiwan, North America, South Korea, Europe, Southeast Asia, China
- Key people: Yoshikazu Nunokawa (chairman), Toshiki Kawai (president & CEO)
- Products: Networking devices, electronic components, production equipment for integrated circuits, flat panel displays and photovoltaic cells
- Revenue: ▲¥2.44 trillion (US$22.26 billion) (FY2026)
- Operating income: ▼¥624.94 billion (US$5.69 billion) (FY2026)
- Net income: ▲¥574.45 billion (US$5.23 billion) (FY2026)
- Total assets: ▲¥2.86 trillion (US$26.07 billion) (FY2026)
- Total equity: ▲¥2.07 trillion (US$18.86 billion) (FY2026)
- Number of employees: 20,236 (2026)
- Parent: TBS Holdings, Inc. (4.67%)
- Subsidiaries: 26 Group companies, including Tokyo Electron Device (TYO: 2760)
- Website: tel.com

Tokyo Electron Limited (Japanese: 東京エレクトロン株式会社, Hepburn: Tokyo Erekutoron Kabushiki-gaisha), or TEL, is a Japanese electronics and semiconductor company headquartered in Akasaka, Minato-ku, Tokyo, Japan. Founded as Tokyo Electron Laboratories, Inc. in 1963, TEL is best known as a supplier of equipment to fabricate integrated circuits (IC), flat panel displays (FPD), and photovoltaic cells (PV). Its subsidiary, Tokyo Electron Device (東京エレクトロンデバイス株式会社, Tokyo Erekutoron Debaisu Kabushiki-gaisha; TYO: 2760), or TED, specializes in semiconductor devices, electronic components, and networking devices. As of 2011, TEL was the largest manufacturer of IC and FPD production equipment. Listed on the Nikkei 225, in 2024, Tokyo Electron had a market cap of US$114.6 billion, making it the third-most valuable company in Japan in terms of market cap, and the 12th ranked semiconductor-related company worldwide.

== Company history ==
=== 1963-1979 ===
On 11 November 1963 Tokyo Electron Laboratories Incorporated was founded by Tokuo Kubo and Toshio Kodaka, largely funded by Tokyo Broadcasting System (TBS), with a capital of over five million yen. Later that year, their office opened in the TBS main building and began selling diffusion furnaces, IC production systems, and other equipment. The following year, it began selling diffusion furnaces made by Thermco Products Corp.

In 1965 the company approached a rapidly growing business in the market, Fairchild Semiconductor Corporation, and agreed to serve as a sales agency for them, increasing their capital to twenty million yen. Tokyo Electron began exporting IC testers, IC sockets, IC connectors, and other similar computer components.

The company opened an office in San Francisco, California and their new branch, Pan Electron, in 1968, establishing themselves as the only stocking distributor of imported electronic components in the region. One year later, they opened their Yokohama office and established Teltron, a major manufacturer and distributor of car stereos, expanding their headquarters to fill the entire TBS-2 building and raising their capital to 100 million yen.

=== 1980-1999 ===
The American electronics company Genrad Inc. and Tokyo Electron Ltd. in 1981 formed a joint venture manufacturing unit, Tel-Genrad Ltd., to make in-circuit board test systems in Japan. Tokyo Electron in 1986 was described by The New York Times as a maker of semiconductor manufacturing equipment.

In 1990, Tokyo Electron was competing with the Japanese company Dai Nippon Screen and the American company Silicon Valley Group as the largest producer of equipment to make semiconductors. In 1991, Tokyo Electron was one of five Japanese companies criticized by the SEMATECH consortium for allegedly withholding new technology from the United States, specifically "precision heating equipment" made by Tokyo Electron Ltd. and Kokusai. By the early 1990s, Tokyo Electron's American rival Applied Materials was losing market share, and "sought U.S. government help in the form of an import quota" to the American market. In May 1995, Tokyo Electron Ltd. was Japan's largest vendor of equipment to make semiconductors.

=== 2000-2026 ===
After import controls, Applied Materials by 2001 was double the size of Tokyo Electron, which was its next nearest competitor. In 2001, TEL acquired Timbre Technologies Inc. in Fremont, California, which developed measurement software technology. In 2004, TEL announced improvements to its plasma etch chamber products. In 2005, Tokyo Electron was still the second-largest maker of chip manufacturing gear after Applied Materials, and above ASML. In 2006, Tokyo Electron had a research center at the Albany NanoTech complex, a nanotechnology center in New York. The company started a venture capital unit in 2006, TEL Venture Capital, based in California.

As of 2011, TEL was the largest manufacturer of IC and FPD production equipment. On September 24, 2013, Tokyo Electron and Applied Materials announced a merger, forming a new company to be called Eteris. Eteris would have been the world's largest supplier of semiconductor processing equipment, with a total market value of approximately $29 billion. On 26 April 2015, the $10 billion merger was cancelled due to antitrust concerns in the United States.

In June 2023, Tokyo Electron was ranked among the Forbes Global 2000 list of the world's largest companies, at which point it had around 12,742 employees. In late 2023, it was the largest semiconductor equipment maker in Asia. It was generating 43 percent of its revenue from China. In October 2023, the company announced it had developed new technology to improve advanced 3D NAND flash memory, making it the only competitor to Lam Research.

In early 2024 the company said it would raise its employees' starting salaries by 40% to secure talent and compete with the payrates of foreign companies. In February 2024, Tokyo Electron's market cap closed at US$114.6 billion, making it the third-most valuable company in Japan in terms of market cap, beating Sony Group. It also become the 12th ranked among semiconductor-related companies worldwide in terms of market cap. It continues to be listed on the Nikkei 225. In 2024, Toshiki Kawai was president and CEO, while Yoshikazu Nunokawa was chairman of the board. Tokyo Electron cut its ties with China Head Jay Chen in 2026, after it discovered his connections to Chinese competitors

== Products and services ==
Supplying equipment to fabricate integrated circuits (IC), flat panel displays (FPD), and photovoltaic cells (PV), according to Barron's in 2024, Tokyo Electron Ltd. is engaged in the "development, manufacture, and sale of semiconductor production equipment and industrial electronics products for flat panel display manufacturing equipment." It has three segments: Semiconductor Production Equipment (SPE), Flat Panel Display (FPD) Production Equipment and Others. Others includes logistics, facilities management, and insurance. In 2023, it was reported that the company's FPD business had become "minor" in its earnings, while its SPE segment was steadily growing. TEL's SPE segment develops and sells SPE such as coaters/developers, plasma etch systems, thermal processing systems, single wafer deposition systems, cleaning systems, and wafer probers. The FPD segment focuses on SPE for flat panel displays. In 2024, services listed by the company included field solutions, engineering services, repairs and spare parts, upgrades and modifications, and overhauling used products.

In 2012, TEL produced SPE for multiple purposes. Among those purposes was thermal processing, involving the deposition of thin layers of dielectric material between transistors onto the silicon wafer surface, using a heated low-pressure chemical vapor deposition (LPCVD) or oxidation process. Also in 2012, products involved photoresist coating and developing to project a microscopic circuitry pattern on the wafer in photolithography. There was also plasma etching, and products focused on wet surface preparation, using cleaning to remove contaminants such as dust. Other product areas in 2012 included single wafer chemical vapor deposition, involving the deposition of thin layers of various materials, such as tungsten, tungsten silicide, titanium, titanium nitride, and tantalum oxide. TEL's wafer probers tested the functionality and performance of each die on the wafer, while other products allowed corrective etching and trimming of thin films such as silicon, silicon nitride, silicon dioxide, aluminum nitride, and metals. It also sold integrated metrology (co-developed by TEL and KLA Tencor) in 2012, and products for material and surface modification and doping using gas cluster ion beam (GCIB) technology. In 2016, it was involved in selling Advanced Packaging.

== Group companies ==
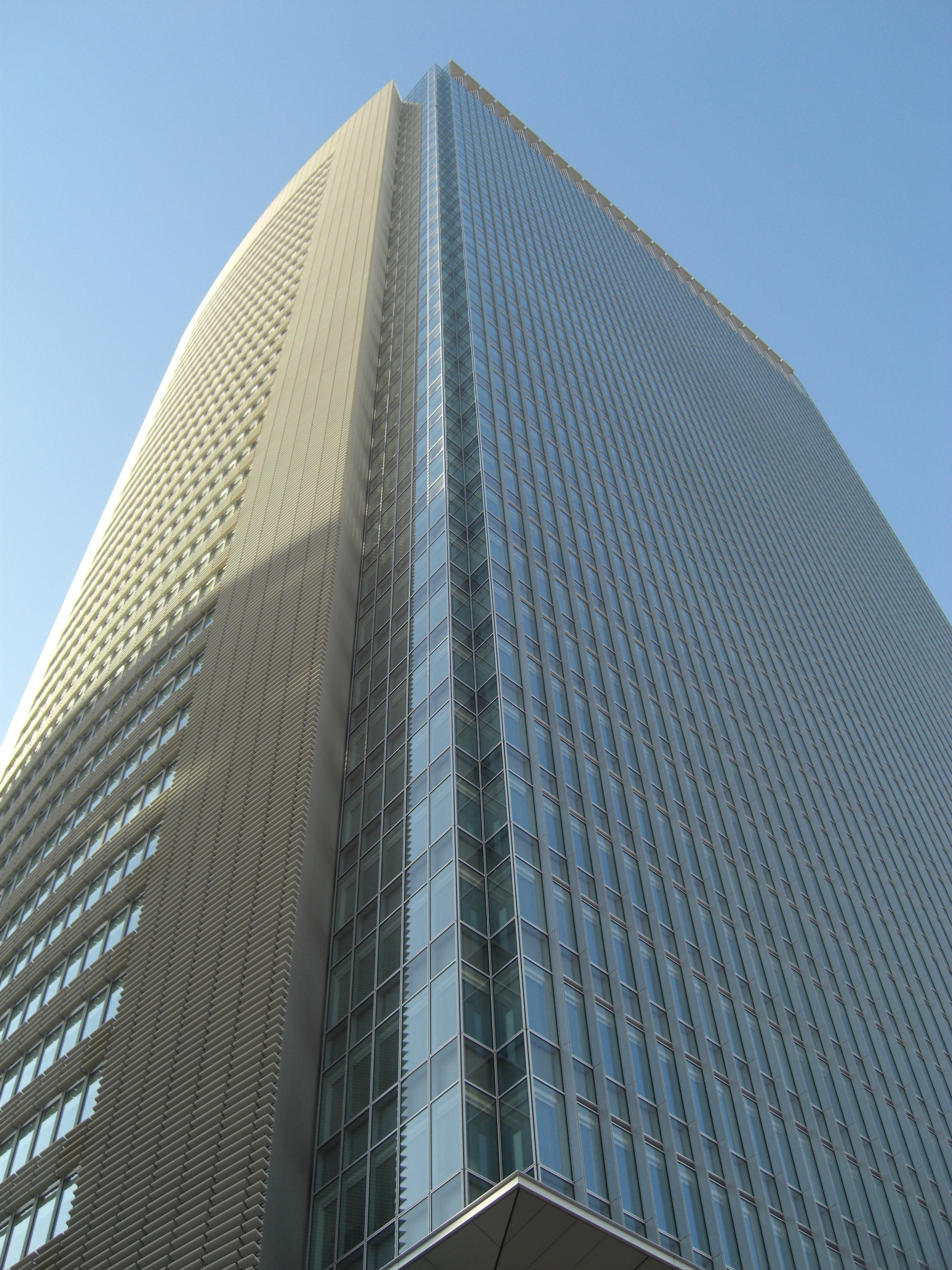
TEL headquarters in akasaka Sacas, Tokyo

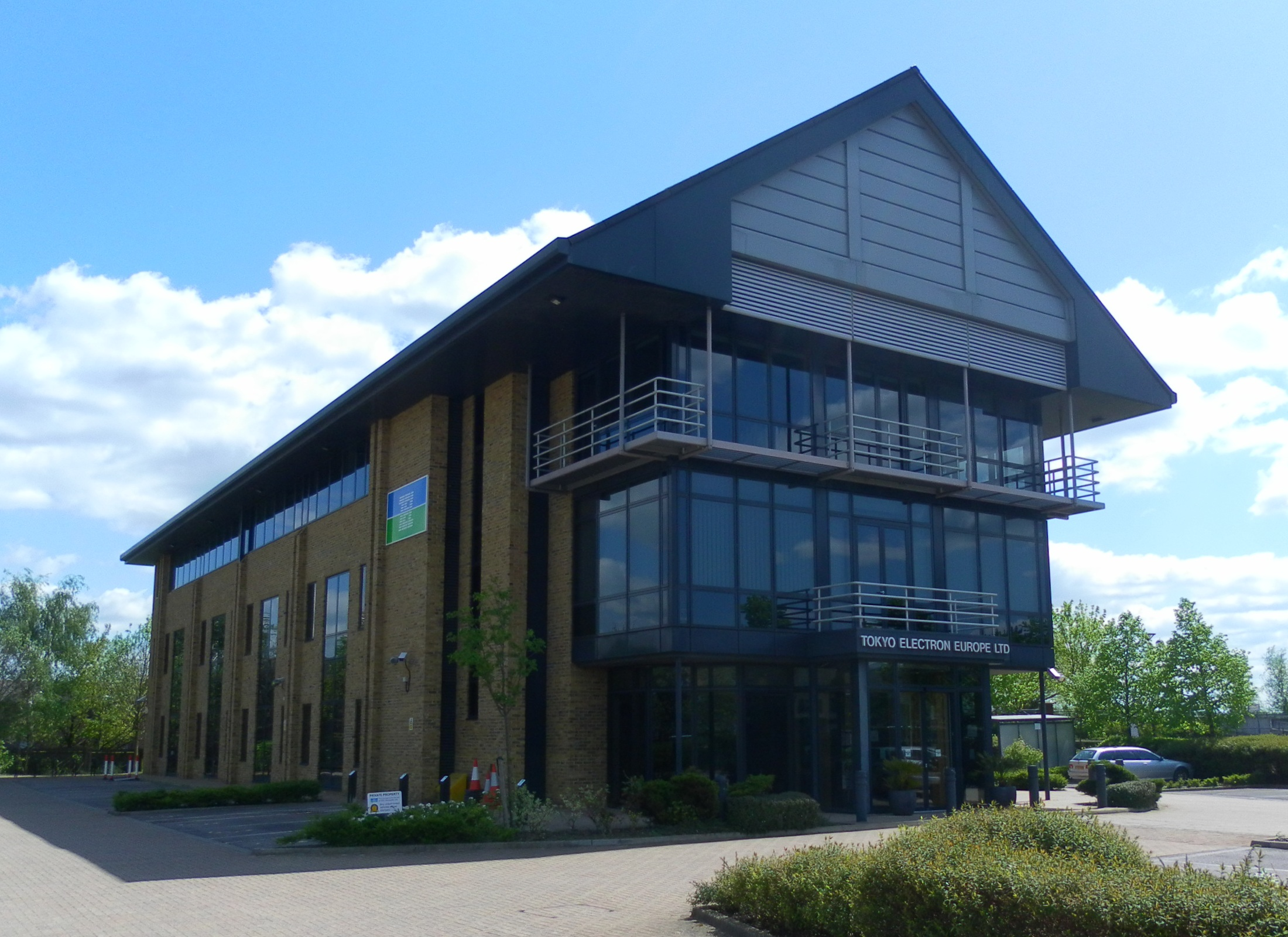
TEL Europe Ltd headquarters in Crawley, England

The Tokyo Electron Group consists of TEL and the following subsidiaries:

- TEL Epion Inc.
- TEL FSI, Inc.
- TEL Solar
- TEL Technology Center, America, LLC
- TEL Venture Capital, Inc.
- Tokyo Electron Device Limited
- Tokyo Electron Yamanashi Limited
- Tokyo Electron Tohoku Limited
- Tokyo Electron Kyushu Limited
- Tokyo Electron Miyagi Limited
- Tokyo Electron Technology Development Institute, Inc.
- Tokyo Electron Software Technologies Limited
- Tokyo Electron FE Limited
- Tokyo Electron BP Limited
- Tokyo Electron PV Limited
- Tokyo Electron TS Limited
- Tokyo Electron Agency Limited
- Tokyo Electron U.S. Holdings, Inc.
- Tokyo Electron America, Inc.
- Tokyo Electron Europe Limited — Head Office (Crawley, England)
  German Branch
  Italian Branch
  Netherlands Branch
  Irish Branch
  French Branch
- Tokyo Electron Israel Limited
- Tokyo Electron Korea Limited
- Tokyo Electron Korea Solution Limited
- Tokyo Electron Taiwan Limited
- Tokyo Electron (Shanghai) Limited
- Tokyo Electron (Shanghai) Logistic Center Limited
- Tokyo Electron (Kunshan) Limited
- Tokyo Electron Malaysia Sdn. Bhd.
- Tokyo Electron Singapore Pte. Ltd.
- Timbre Technologies, Inc.

== Research and development ==
TEL's Leading-edge Process Development Center is located in Nirasaki, Yamanashi Prefecture. TEL also has the Kansai Technology Center in Amagasaki, Hyogo Prefecture and the Sendai Design and Development Center in Sendai, Miyagi Prefecture. TEL Technology Center, America, LLC in Albany, New York is the R&D center in the United States. TEL is one of the partners of IMEC, a microelectronics and nanoelectronics research center in Leuven, Belgium.

In July 2014 TEL announced the establishment of joint assembly lab with the Institute of Microelectronics in Singapore. The lab is focused on the research and development of Wafer Level Packaging and assembly, to address the need of Internet of Things with devices of high performance and low power consumption.

In 2023 it was selling its US headquarters in Southeast Austin, Texas, under CEO Toshiki Kawai. In 2024, it leased a new American headquarters in Austin. In 2025, Tokyo Electron Technology Solutions, the company's manufacturing subsidiary, is expected to build a $170 million chip equipment plant in Oshu, Iwate Prefecture.

== Sponsorships ==
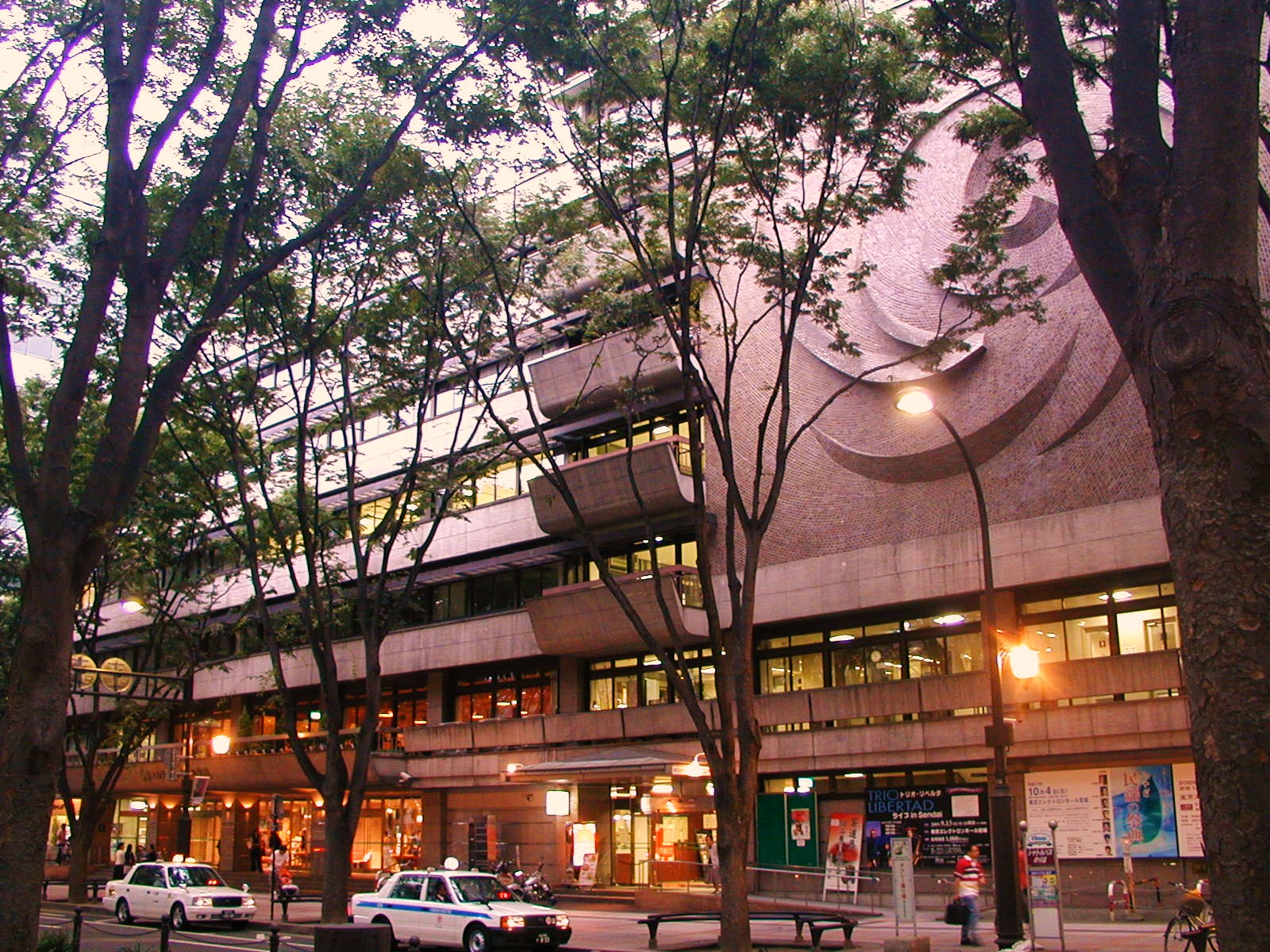
Tokyo Electron Hall Miyagi in downtown Sendai

TEL supports association football in Japan by sponsoring the J. League as a whole and the football club Ventforet Kofu based in Kofu and Nirasaki as well as the rest of Yamanashi Prefecture.

The company has acquired naming rights of two multipurpose halls:

- "Tokyo Electron Nirasaki Ars Hall" (ja:韮崎市文化ホール) owned by Nirasaki City
- "Tokyo Electron Hall Miyagi" (ja:宮城県民会館) owned by Miyagi Prefecture (currently closed due to the heavy earthquake damage)

== See also ==
- Semiconductor device fabrication
- Semiconductor equipment sales leaders by year
- Tokyo Broadcasting System
- List of companies of Japan
- List of largest technology companies by revenue
