= Risako Itō =

Japanese actress and model

- 伊藤 梨沙子
- Born: February 20, 1996 (age 30); Tokyo, Japan
- Other name: Risako (りさこ)
- Education: Sunrise Junior and Senior High School; Nihon University College of Art
- Occupations: Actress; model
- Years active: 2005–present
- Agents: Ever Green Entertainment (2005–16); Cube (2016–)
- Height: 1.565 m (5 ft 2 in) (2014)
- Awards: Shogaku Go-nensei Model Audition Quasi-Grand Prix; Ribon Girl Quasi-Grand Prix

Risako Itō (伊藤 梨沙子, Itō Risako; born February 20, 1996 in Tokyo) is a Japanese actress, fashion model and gravure model.

Itō was once represented by Ever Green Entertainment. She gained notable fame near the end of 2017 for her involvement in the Long Long Man commercials produced by UHA for their Sakeru Gummy brand.

== Biography ==
By the time she was in fourth grade, Itō started working as a magazine model. In 2005, she joined Ever Green Entertainment. Itō made regular appearances in "Oha Girl" of Oha Suta along with Mayu Matsuoka and Hidemi Hikita from 7 April 2008 until 26 March 2010. In November 2011, she was chosen as the Miss Weekly Young Jump (Note: During the year there was no Grand Prix, the award was decided by the magazines.) of Gravure Japan co-hosted by Weekly Young Jump and Weekly Playboy.

Itō left Ever Green Entertainment in April 2016. In June 2016, she joined the talent agency Cube.

== Filmography ==
Year	Title	Role	Network	Notes	Ref.
2006	Ultraman Mebius		CBC	Episode 23	
2007	Kiseki no Dōbutsuen 2007: Asahiyama Dōbutsuen Monogatari	Chisato	Fuji TV		
2009	Ijiwaru bāsan	Sanae Ichiwari	Fuji TV		
2009	Shōnen Jidai	Yukino Hayami	THK		
2010	Yume no Mitsuke-kata Oshietaru! 2		Fuji TV		
2011	Sengoku Otoko-shi	Megohime	TVK, Chiba TV, TV Saitama, Sun TV		
2011	Hunter: Sono Onna-tachi, Shōkin Kasegi	Akane Isaka (teenager)	KTV	Episode 1	
2012	Shiawase no Jikan	Kaori Asakura	THK		
2013	ST: Keishichō Kagaku Tokusō Han		NTV		
2013	35-sai no Koukousei		NTV	Episode 4	
2013	Kakushō: Keishichō Sōsa 3-ka	Ayano Sasaki	TBS	Episode 10	
2013	Real Dasshutsu Game: Misshitsu Bishōjo	Mirai Otori	TV Tokyo		
2014	Mischievous Kiss 2: Love in Tokyo	Tomoko Ogura	Fuji TV		
2015	Jōryū Kaikyū: Fukumaru Hyakkaten Gaishō-bu		Fuji TV		
2015	3-ttsu no Machi no Monogatari		TBS		
2017	Kamen Rider Build	Kasumi Ogura	EX	Episode 2	

=== Films ===
Year	Title	Role	Ref.
2006	Akiba		
2007	South Bound	Nanae Shirai	
2008	Kodomo no Kodomo	Mika Yoshida	
2012	Graffreeter Toki		
2013	Gachiban Supremacy		
2014	High Kick Angels	Fuyumi Igarashi	
2014	Shishunki-gokko	Sonoko Miura	

=== Stage ===
Year	Title	Role	Notes	Ref.
2012	Itsunomanika, Kimi wa	Misaki		
2012	Jikū Keisatsu Wecker Kai: Hōkō no Etoranze	Jikū Keiji Rita / Kaminagi Rita	(Note: Alice In Project production performance.)	
2012	Lodi Musical	Shirley		
2012	Natsu Genei	Arisa		
2013	Aoi Kisetsu			
2013	Abaddon no Sōkutsu			
2014	Jōryoku Kōkō Engeki-bu			
2014	Legend: Kaze no Naka no Chiri			
2015	Puyo Puyo	Arle Nadja		
2015	Fushigi Yûgi	Miaka Yuuki		

=== Internet ===
Year	Title	Role	Website	Notes	Ref.
2011	Shōnan Natsu Koi Monogatari	Sakura	BeeTV		
2011	Nikkan Tobidasu: 45 Girl	Mei	Itsunomani TV	(Note: Fuji Television production.) (Note: Every Tuesdays and Fridays.)	
2011	Nikkan Tobidasu: NDS48	Fukuro	Itsunomani TV	(Note: Fuji Television production.) (Note: Every Wednesdays and Saturdays.)	
2012	Tobidasu Z: 45 Girl Z	Mei	Nintendo Video		
2014	Danmaku Hero: Nico Busters	Natsuko / Nico Mizutama	Niconico Live		

=== Variety series ===
Year	Title	Network	Notes
2008	Oha Suta	TV Tokyo	As Oha Girl Risako
2010	Suiensaa	NHK-E	As a Suiensaa Girl
2012	Test no Hanamichi	NHK-E	As a Benbu staff (Note: Staff number was A-0033.)
2014	Sansuu Inu Wan	NHK-E	As Tenko (Note: Pilot aired in the 14 August 2013.)

=== Magazines ===
Year	Title	Notes
2005	Shogaku Shi-nensei	Exclusive model
2006	Shogaku Go-nensei	Exclusive model (Note: Shogaku Go-nensei Model Audition finalist.)
	Ribon	Exclusive model (Note: Ribon Girl finalist.)
2008	Pichi Lemon	Exclusive model

=== Advertisements ===
Year	Title	Ref.
2006	J:Com Mobile	
2006	J:Com HDR	
2006	Benesse Inu no kimochi	
2006	Tomy Won! Tertainment Idol Puppy	
2007	J:Com Kigyō	
2007	Benesse Tokuten-ryoku Gakushū DS	
2007	Propia	
2008	Electronic Arts Boom Box	
2008	Electronic Arts MySims Kingdom	
2010	Minami Nihon Rakuno Kyodo Ai no Skal	
2011	Bandai Tamagotchi iD L	
2011	The Asahi Shimbun Company Asahi Shimbun Digital	
2012	Yellow Hat Kigyō	
2013	NHK Mirai TV 60 Renzoku TV Shōsetsu	
2013	Kagome Kakeru Tomato	
2013	Adidas Soccer Nihon Daihyō Uniform	
2014	McDonald's Shaka Shaka Chicken	
2014	Tokyo Gas Anzen	
2014	NTT Directory Services Town page	
2017	UHA Mikakuto "Long Long Man"	

=== Advertising ===
Year	Title	Notes
2012	Adidas Bag Collection	Image model
2014	Ace World Traveler	Image character

=== Music videos ===
Year	Title
2013	miwa "Whistle: Kimi to Sugoshita Hibi"
2013	Code-V "Yakusoku"

== Publications ==
=== Videos ===
Year	Title
2012	Veil
2012	Funwari-sa-ko
