= Akasaka, Tokyo =

Akasaka 赤坂
- District
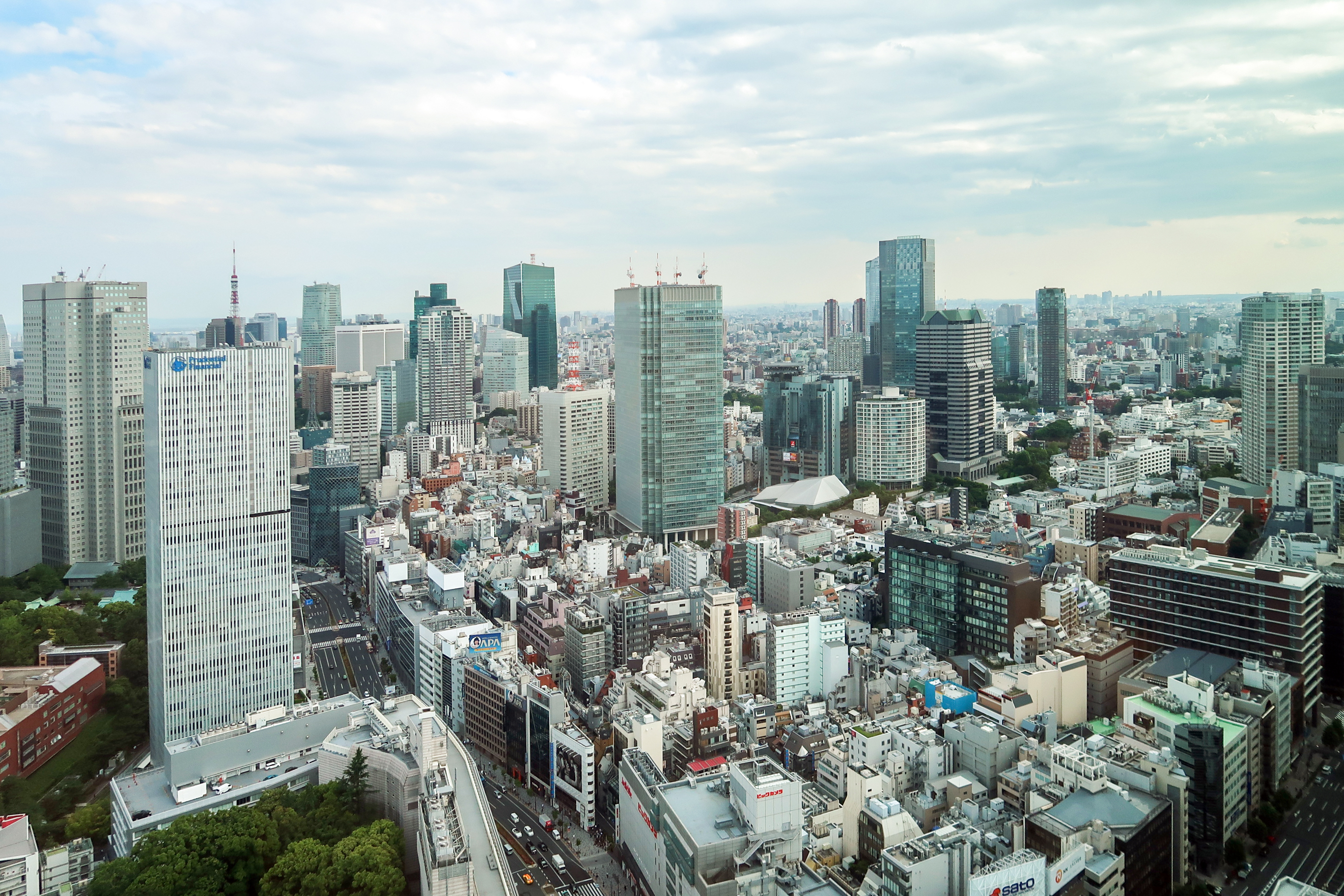
- Akasaka in 2018

- Location in Tokyo Location in Japan
- Coordinates: 35°40′29″N 139°43′54″E
- Country: Japan
- City: Tokyo
- Ward: Minato
- Area: Akasaka Area

Population (January 1, 2016)
  - Total: 17,603
- Time zone: UTC+9 (JST)
- Postal code: 107-0052
- Area code: 03

Akasaka (赤坂) is a residential and commercial district of Minato, Tokyo, Japan, located west of the government center in Nagatachō and north of the Roppongi district.

Akasaka (including the neighboring area of Aoyama) was a ward of Tokyo City from 1878 to 1947, and maintains a branch office of the Minato City government.

== Notable sites ==
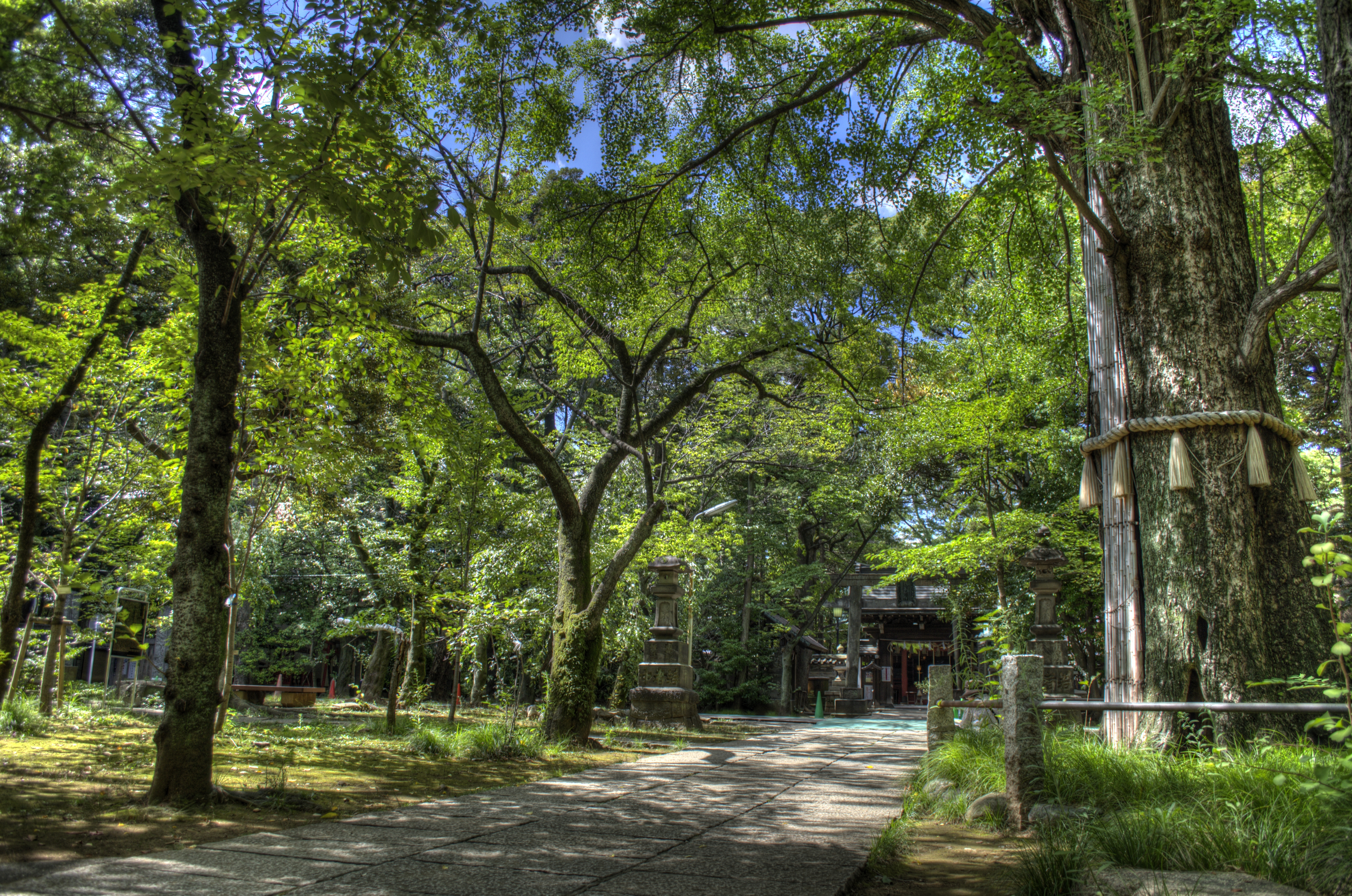
Hikawa Shrine

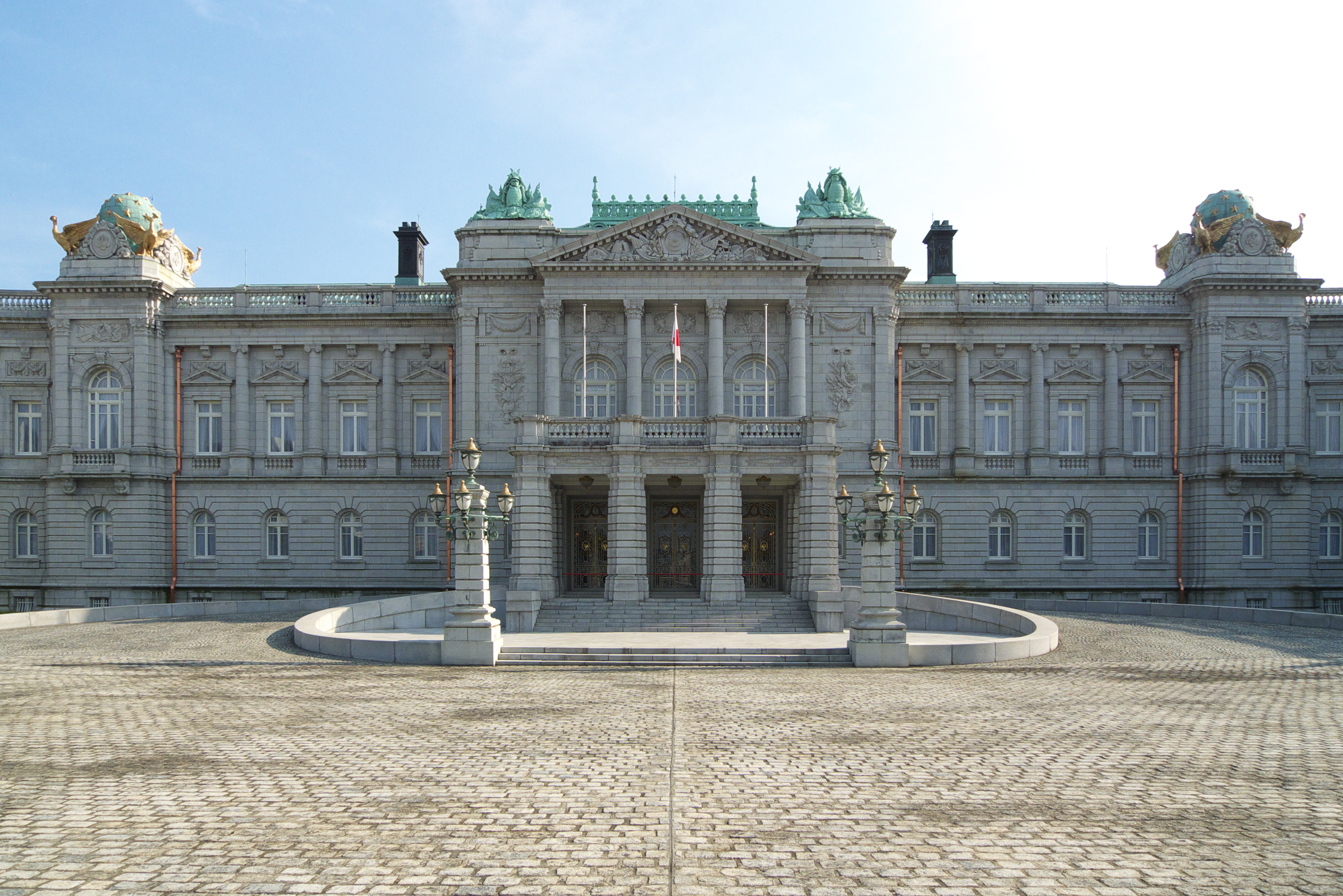
State Guest House, Akasaka Palace

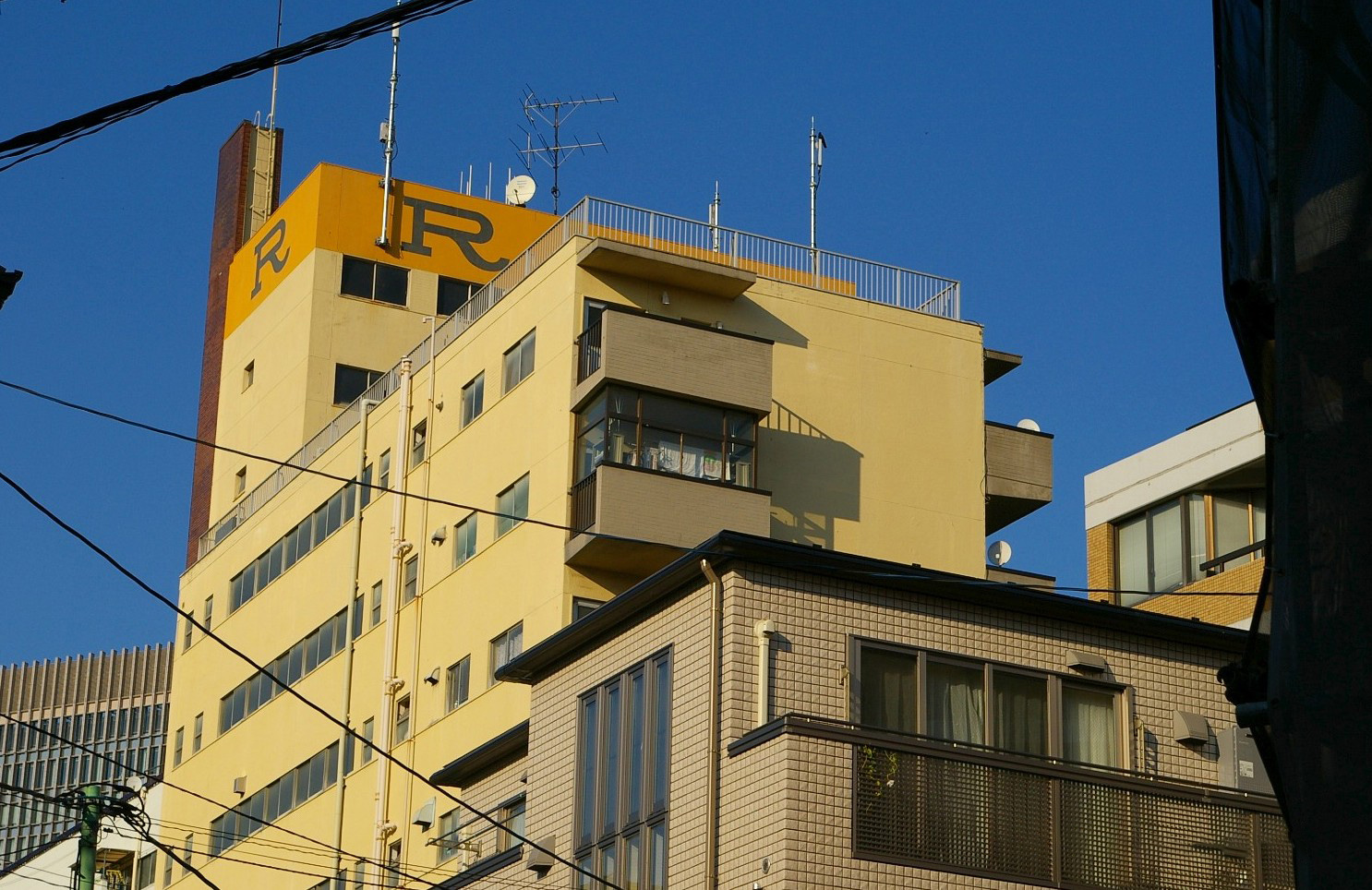
Rikidōzan's expensive apartment in Japan, called "the Riki Mansion", as it existed in 2007

- Akasaka Sacas
- Embassy of the United States, Mexico, Cambodia, Canada, Iraq, Spain and Syria as well as San Marino
- Ark Hills and Suntory Hall
- Hikawa Shrine
- Nogi Shrine
- Tokyo Midtown
- Takahashi Korekiyo's residence and memorial park
- Riki Mansion home of Rikidōzan

In neighbouring Moto-Akasaka (literally "original Akasaka") to the North:

- Akasaka Palace (State Guest House)
- Togu Palace Residence of the Crown Prince of Japan

== Companies based in Akasaka ==
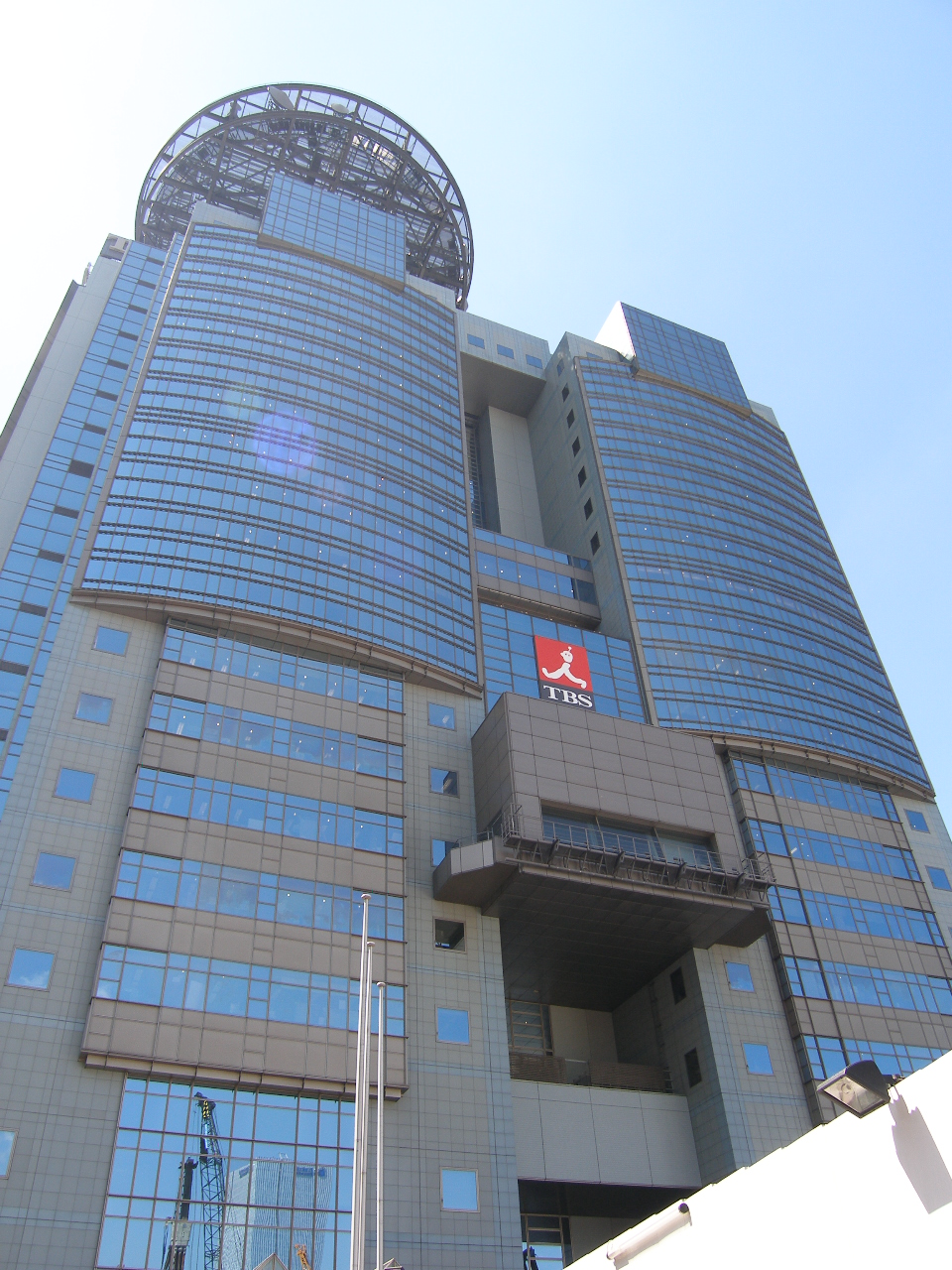
TBS Broadcasting Center in Akasaka

- Anycolor 9-7-2, Akasaka
- DefSTAR Records 4-5 Akasaka
- EMI Music Japan 5-3-1 Akasaka
- Epic Records Japan 9-6-35 Akasaka
- Fujifilm
- Fuji Xerox
- Hazama Ando
- Hudson Soft
- JETRO (Japan External Trade Organization)-1-12-32 Akasaka
- Johnny & Associates 8-11-20 Akasaka
- Ki/oon Records: Same as Epic Records Japan
- Kaneka Corporation
- Komatsu 2-3-6 Akasaka
- Sigma Seven 2-16-8 Akasaka
- Tokyo Broadcasting System Holdings, Inc. 5-3-6 Akasaka
  - Tokyo Broadcasting System Television, Inc.
  - TBS Radio & Communications, Inc.
  - BS-TBS, Inc.
  - C-TBS, Inc.
- Tokyo Electron Ltd. 3-1-5 Akasaka
- Toraya Confectionery
- Universal Music Japan LLC 8-5-30 Akasaka
- Wa Group Japan 4-3-27 Akasaka
- Geneon Universal Entertainment 5-2-20 Akasaka
- WOWOW (Akasaka Park Building)

Previously Jaleco Holding had its headquarters in the Akasaka DS Building (赤坂DSビル, Akasaka DS Biru) in Akasaka.

The Japanese offices of the following are based in Akasaka:

- Becton, Dickinson and Company 4-15-1 Akasaka
- Clifford Chance
- Iran Air
- ING 4-1 Akasaka
- Milbank Tweed
- Thomson Reuters
- GlaxoSmithKline Japan

== Subway stations ==
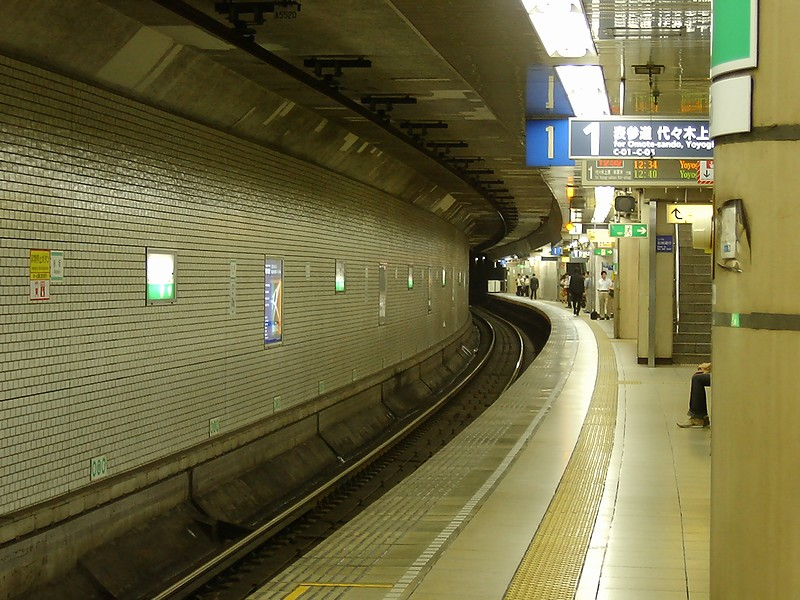
A platform of Akasaka Station

- Akasaka Station (Tokyo Metro Chiyoda Line)
- Akasaka-mitsuke Station (Tokyo Metro: Ginza Line, Marunouchi Line, connected to Nagatacho Station via underpasses)
- Nagatacho Station (Tokyo Metro Hanzōmon Line, Tokyo Metro Yurakucho Line, Tokyo Metro Namboku Line, connected to Akasaka-mitsuke Station via passageways)
- Aoyama-itchōme Station (Tokyo Metro Hanzomon Line, Tokyo Metro Ginza Line, Toei Oedo Line)
- Nogizaka Station (Tokyo Metro Chiyoda Line)
- Tameike-Sannō Station (Tokyo Metro: Ginza Line, Namboku Line, connected to Kokkai-gijidomae Station via passageways)

== Education ==
=== Schools ===
Akasaka's public elementary and junior high schools are operated by the Minato City Board of Education ( in English, in Japanese).

Akasaka 1-9-chōme are zoned to Akasaka Elementary School (赤坂小学校) and Akasaka Junior High School (赤坂中学校).

Akasaka High School was operated by the Tokyo Metropolitan Government Board of Education. It closed down in March 2009. It reopened the next month as the Aoyama campus of Ōta Sakuradai High School .

Third Junior & Senior High School of Nihon University was previously in Akasaka, but it moved to Machida in 1976.

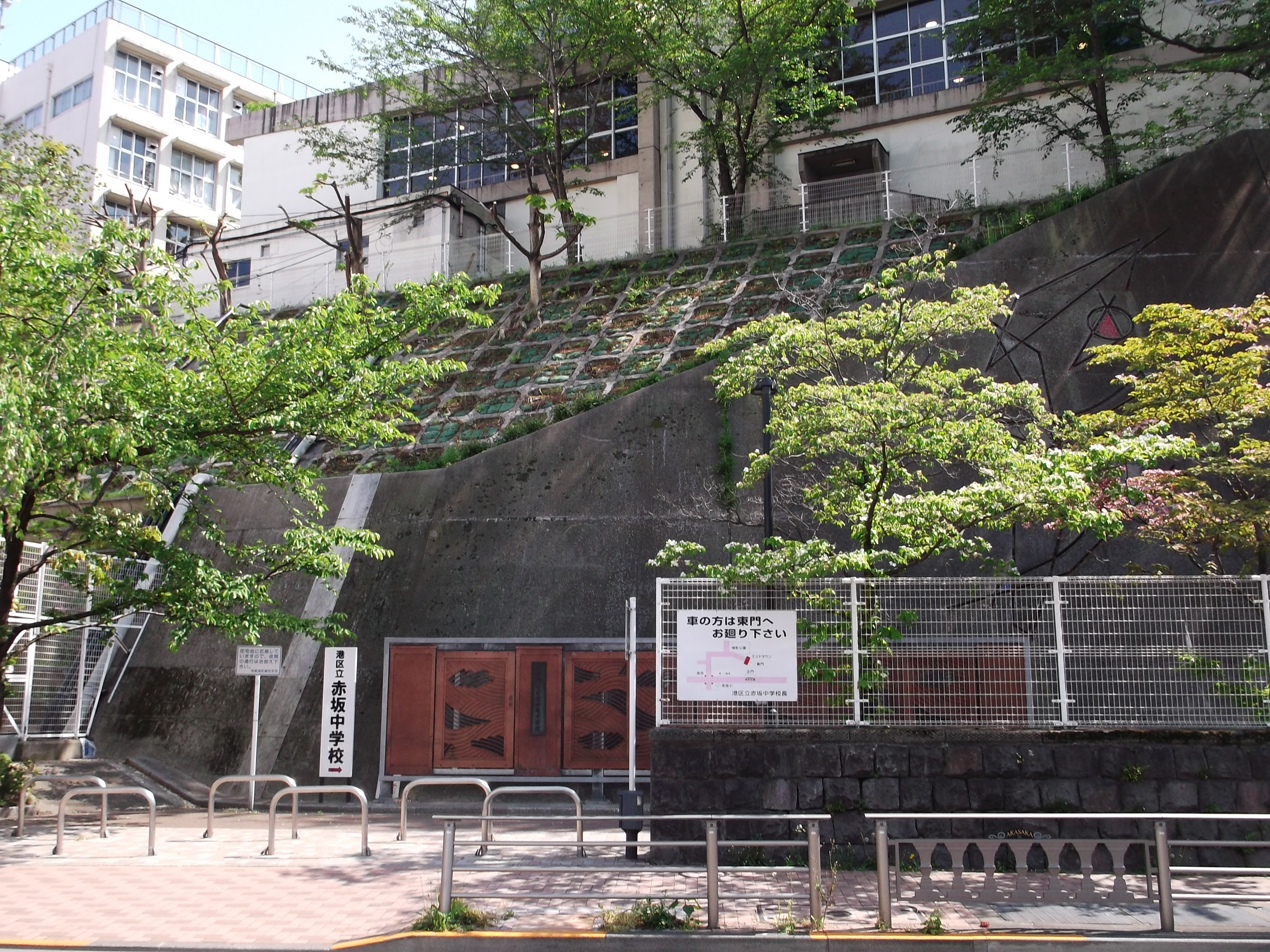
Akasaka Junior High School (赤坂中学校)

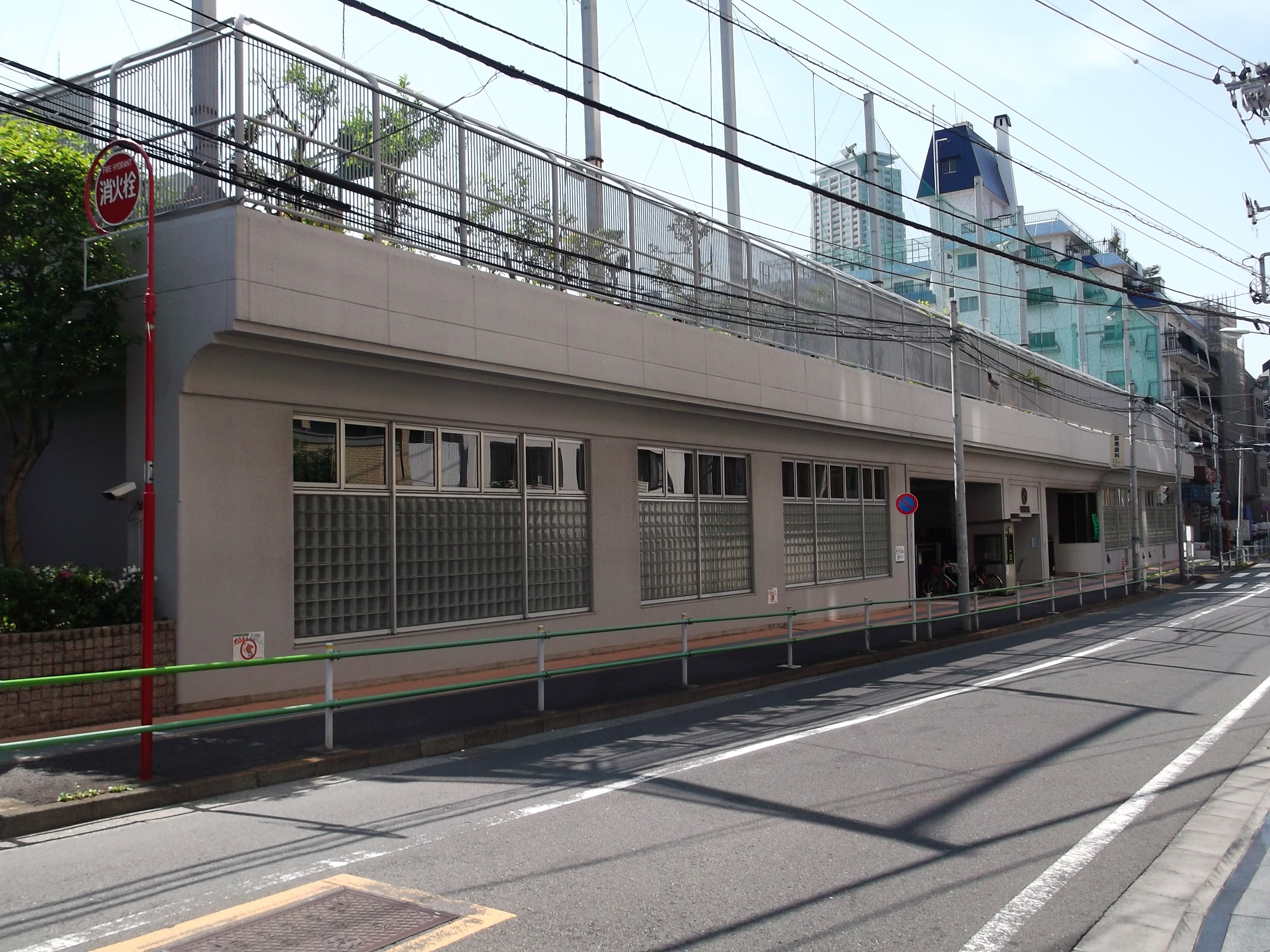
Akasaka Elementary School (赤坂小学校)

=== Libraries ===
The Akasaka Library has moved to a new building in 2007, near the Aoba Park and the Aoyama-itchōme subway station.
