= Gacha Girls Corps =

Japanese light novel series

- First light novel volume cover

ガチャを回して仲間を増やす 最強の美少女軍団を作り上げろ (Gacha o Mawashite Nakama o Fuyasu: Saikyō no Bishōjo Gundan o Tsukuriagero)
- Genre: Adventure, fantasy, isekai
- Novel series
- Written by: Chinkururi
- Published by: Shōsetsuka ni Narō
- Original run: January 25, 2016 – present
- Light novel
- Written by: Chinkururi
- Illustrated by: Yasutaka Isekawa
- Published by: Micro Magazine
- Imprint: GC Novels
- Original run: November 30, 2016 – August 31, 2020
- Volumes: 9
- Manga
- Written by: Chinkururi
- Illustrated by: Syuu Haruno
- Published by: Micro Magazine
- English publisher: NA: Kaiten Books
- Imprint: Ride Comics
- Magazine: Comic Ride
- Original run: March 30, 2018 – present
- Volumes: 14
- Anime television series
- Directed by: Masahiro Takata (chief); Takashi Asami
- Produced by: Ryō Aizawa
- Written by: Deko Akao
- Music by: Hiroaki Tsutsumi; George King
- Studio: Zero-G; Saber Works
- Licensed by: Crunchyroll
- Original network: Tokyo MX, BS11, HBC, RKB, AT-X
- Original run: January 7, 2027 – scheduled
- icon

Gacha Girls Corps (Japanese: ガチャを回して仲間を増やす 最強の美少女軍団を作り上げろ, Hepburn: Gacha o Mawashite Nakama o Fuyasu Saikyō no Bishōjo Gundan o Tsukuriagero) is a Japanese light novel series written by Chinkururi and illustrated by Yasutaka Isekawa. It originally began serialization as a web novel on the Shōsetsuka ni Narō website in January 2016, before Micro Magazine published nine volumes in print under their GC Novels imprint from November 2016 to August 2020. A manga adaptation illustrated by Syuu Haruno began serialization in Micro Magazine's Comic Ride online magazine in March 2018 and has been compiled into fourteen volumes as of June 2026. The manga is licensed in English by Kaiten Books. An anime television series adaptation produced by Zero-G and Saber Works is set to premiere in January 2027.

== Plot ==
Heihachi Okura, a man addicted to gacha games, is a fan of the mobile game Girls Corps. One day, while playing the game, he receives an item that claims to be an invitation to be sent to another world. Initially being skeptical about rolling this ultra rare item, he is suddenly summoned to another world, where he is immediately attacked by a monster. After escaping, he summons Norl Fanya, a helmeted knight who thrusts him into a tutorial scenario. Upon beating the tutorial, he starts traveling with Norl, with Norl being thankful for him summoning her.

== Characters ==
Heihachi Okura (大倉 平八, Ōkura Heihachi)
Voiced by: Daisuke Sakaguchi
A mobile gamer who spends most of his money on the game Girls Corps. He finds himself summoned to another world through the game, vowing to create his own team of cute girls. Having brought his phone with him to the other world, he uses it to summon girls, much like a gacha game.
Norl Fanya (ノール・ファニャ, Nōru Fanya)
Voiced by: Miyu Tomita
A female knight that Heihachi summoned shortly after arriving in the other world. She wears a helmet that hides her face. Despite appearance, she can show a cheerful side. She is attached to Heihachi due to him being her first master. She is particular about hiding her face, even going as far as to wear a mask when not wearing her helmet.
Estelle (エステル, Esuteru)
Voiced by: Iori Noguchi
A red-haired skilled magician and an UR girl. She has a little sister-like personality, to the point that she is attached to Heihachi and calls him "onii-san".
Shisuha Alvy (シスハ・アルヴィ, Shisuha Aruvi)
Voiced by: Ai Kayano
Luna Varedas (ルーナ・ヴァラド, Rūna Varado)
Voiced by: Rie Kugimiya
Migle (ミグル, Miguru)
Voiced by: Aimi Ozawa
Lennon (レノン, Renon)
Voiced by: Renon Esumi
Mofutto (モフット)
Voiced by: Momo Sakurai (≠Me)

== Media ==
=== Light novel ===
Written by Chinkururi, Gacha Girls Corps initially began serialization on the user-generated novel publishing website Shōsetsuka ni Narō on January 25, 2016. It was later acquired by Micro Magazine who published nine volumes with illustrations by Yasutaka Isekawa under their GC Novels light novel imprint from November 30, 2016, to August 31, 2020.

No.	Release date	ISBN
1	November 30, 2016	978-4-89637-602-9
2	March 31, 2017	978-4-89637-625-8
3	September 29, 2017	978-4-89637-652-4
4	March 30, 2018	978-4-89637-699-9
5	September 28, 2018	978-4-89637-817-7
6	April 27, 2019	978-4-89637-873-3
7	August 30, 2019	978-4-89637-910-5
8	January 30, 2020	978-4-89637-954-9
9	August 31, 2020	978-4-86716-044-2

=== Manga ===
A manga adaptation illustrated by Syuu Haruno began serialization in Micro Magazine's Comic Ride online magazine on March 30, 2018. The manga's chapters have been compiled into fourteen tankōbon volumes as of June 2026.

In December 2020, Kaiten Books announced that they had licensed the manga adaptation for English publication. The series was added to Azuki in June 2021 as a launch title.

No.	Original release date	Original ISBN	North American release date	North American ISBN
1	September 28, 2018	978-4-89637-821-4	January 8, 2021 (digital); July 20, 2021 (print)	978-1-952241-14-7 (digital); 978-1-952241-15-4 (print)
2	April 27, 2019	978-4-89637-878-8	August 6, 2021 (digital); January 27, 2023 (print)	978-1-952241-26-0 (digital); 978-1-952241-27-7 (print)
3	December 26, 2019	978-4-89637-959-4	December 17, 2021 (digital); April 7, 2023 (print)	978-1-952241-30-7 (digital); 978-1-952241-31-4 (print)
4	August 31, 2020	978-4-86716-050-3	January 27, 2023 (digital); January 5, 2024 (print)	978-1-952241-48-2 (digital); 978-1-952241-49-9 (print)
5	March 27, 2021	978-4-86716-118-0	June 23, 2023 (digital); TBA (print)	978-1-952241-56-7 (digital); 978-1-952241-57-4 (print)
6	October 28, 2021	978-4-86716-200-2	March 8, 2024 (digital); TBA (print)	978-1-952241-68-0 (digital); 978-1-952241-69-7 (print)
7	May 31, 2022	978-4-86716-293-4	September 6, 2024 (digital); TBA (print)	978-1-952241-72-7 (digital); 978-1-952241-73-4 (print)
8	December 28, 2022	978-4-86716-376-4	—	—
9	July 28, 2023	978-4-86716-449-5	—	—
10	February 28, 2024	978-4-86716-536-2	—	—
11	October 31, 2024	978-4-86716-649-9	—	—
12	May 29, 2025	978-4-86716-763-2	—	—
13	December 25, 2025	978-4-86716-885-1	—	—
14	June 29, 2026	978-4-86716-984-1	—	—

=== Anime ===
An anime adaptation was announced on May 29, 2025. It was later confirmed to be a television series that will be produced by Zero-G and Saber Works and directed by Takashi Asami, with Masahiro Takata serving as chief director, Deko Akao handling series composition, Miori Suzuki designing the characters, and Hiroaki Tsutsumi and George King composing the music. It is set to premiere on January 7, 2027, on Tokyo MX and other networks. The ending theme song is "Mofu-kyun Heart♡" (もふきゅんハート♡), performed by Momo Sakurai as her character Mofutto. Crunchyroll will stream the series.

== See also ==
- Bogus Skill "Fruitmaster", another light novel series with the same illustrator
