= Shed that Skin, Ryugasaki-san! =

Japanese manga series

- First tankōbon volume cover

剥かせて！竜ケ崎さん (Mukasete! Ryūgasaki-san)
- Genre: Romantic comedy
- Manga
- Written by: Kazutomo Ichitomo
- Published by: Overlap
- English publisher: NA: Kaiten Books
- Imprint: Gardo Comics
- Magazine: Comic Gardo
- Original run: February 13, 2019 – present
- Volumes: 6

Shed that Skin, Ryugasaki-san! (剥かせて！竜ケ崎さん, Mukasete! Ryūgasaki-san) is a Japanese manga series written and illustrated by Kazutomo Ichitomo. It was initially published as a webcomic on the Nico Nico Seiga manga website in November 2018. It was later acquired by Overlap began serialization on its Comic Gardo manga website in February 2019.

== Synopsis ==
The series is centered around Ryugasaki, a high school girl with reptilian features, and Yugami, a boy in her class with an obsession with her reptilian features; particularly with her shed skin.

== Publication ==
Written and illustrated by Kazutomo Ichitomo, Shed that Skin, Ryugasaki-san! was initially published as a webcomic on the Nico Nico Seiga manga website on November 27, 2018. It was later acquired by Overlap and began serialization on its Comic Gardo manga website on February 13, 2019. Its chapters have been compiled into six tankōbon volumes as of October 2025. The series is licensed in North America by Kaiten Books.

No.	Original release date	Original ISBN	North American release date	North American ISBN
1	May 25, 2019	978-4-86554-500-5	November 30, 2020	978-1-952241-02-4
Chapters 0–21; Chapters 9.5 and 21.5
2	June 25, 2020	978-4-86554-689-7	July 20, 2021	978-1-952241-10-9
Chapters 22–51
3	March 25, 2021	978-4-86554-877-8	—	—
4	August 25, 2022	978-4-8240-0281-5	—	—
5	March 25, 2024	978-4-8240-0775-9	—	—
6	October 25, 2025	978-4-8240-1388-0	—	—

== See also ==
- Handyman Saitou in Another World, another manga series by Kazutomo Ichitomo
