= Handyman Saitou in Another World =

Japanese manga series

- First tankōbon volume cover

便利屋斎藤さん、異世界に行く (Benriya Saitō-san, Isekai ni Iku)
- Genre: Fantasy; Isekai
- Manga
- Written by: Kazutomo Ichitomo
- Published by: Kadokawa Shoten
- English publisher: NA: Yen Press
- Imprint: MF Comics
- Magazine: ComicWalker
- Original run: October 12, 2018 – present
- Volumes: 15
- Anime television series
- Directed by: Toshiyuki Kubooka
- Written by: Kenta Ihara
- Music by: Tomotaka Ōsumi
- Studio: C2C
- Licensed by: Crunchyroll
- Original network: AT-X, Tokyo MX, SUN, KBS Kyoto, BS NTV
- Original run: January 8, 2023 – March 26, 2023
- Episodes: 12
- icon

Handyman Saitou in Another World (便利屋斎藤さん、異世界に行く, Benriya Saitō-san, Isekai ni Iku) is a Japanese web manga series written and illustrated by Kazutomo Ichitomo. It has been serialized on Kadokawa Shoten's ComicWalker website since October 2018 and has been collected in fifteen tankōbon volumes. An anime television series adaptation produced by C2C aired from January to March 2023.

== Plot ==
Saitou, a young handyman from Japan, had been feeling unappreciated in his job, despite his skills. Dejected over getting unfairly fired, he accidentally walked in front of a speeding truck and was subsequently displaced into a fantasy world, where he was taken in by an adventuring party. With the party members' personal quirks hindering their performance, Saitou begins lending them a helping hand, carrying essentials, picking locks and giving them vital reminders, thus making him indispensable to his new friends.

== Characters ==
Saitou (サイトウ, Saitō)
Voiced by: Ryōhei Kimura (Japanese); Blake McNamara (English)
A Japanese handyman who suffers from a slight insecurity complex, but is more capable than he realizes. Professionally skilled in appraising and repairing items and picking locks, he becomes the effective thief of his adventuring party.
Raelza (ラエルザ, Raeruza)
Voiced by: Fairouz Ai (Japanese); Sarah Roach (English)
Morlock's adopted daughter is a warrior and the main fighter of Saitou's adventuring party. A former slave girl, she lost her parents while they were living in the wilderness, and was living alone, then later with a single wolf pup until Morlock found and took her into his care. She is very self-conscious and also has a fear of long, slimy creatures, including eels. She develops feelings for Saitou after witnessing his skills and personality in action, but is too shy to admit this to him.
Lafanpan (ラファンパン, Rafanpan)
Voiced by: Nao Tōyama (Japanese); Krystal LaPorte (English)
A female moonlight fairy cleric. However, while her healing magic and her ability to turn undead are highly appreciated, she charges fees for her services, even from her friends and allies. She uses the gold coins thus gained as sacrifices to the Goddess of the Moon, who had cursed her race to shrink in size if not receiving such regular offerings.
Morlock (モーロック, Mōrokku) / Bergheim Chrome (ベルクハイム・クローム, Berukuhaimu Kurōmu)
Voiced by: Chō (Japanese); Bradley Campbell (English)
The mage of Saitou's adventuring party. While capable in terms of magical power, he suffers dementia, often even forgetting which side he is actually on or the correct incantations for his spell repertoire. It is hinted that his actual name is Bergheim Chrome and he lost his memorial capacities due to a curse when he went to investigate some old magic over twenty years ago. He also suffers from a chronically bad back and likes to woo any pretty female he meets.
Mevena (メヴェナ)
Voiced by: Ayaka Ōhashi (Japanese); Kelly Greenshield (English)
The female human proprietor of a shop providing weapons and equipment for adventurers. Despite looking naïve, she is a shrewd businessgirl who recognizes the true worth of any merchandise she gets offered.
Gibungle (ギブングル, Gibunguru)
Voiced by: Kōichi Sōma (Japanese); Chris Guerrero (English)
A dwarf who, most unusual for his race, possesses the capability of using arcane magic, making him a natural mage. He claims to be a former student of Morlock, before the latter apparently lost his memories. Despite his tough appearance, he has a soft spot for cute animals such as puppies.
Lilyza Lassenpop (リリーザ・ラッセンポップ, Rirīza Rassenpoppu)
Voiced by: Yumiri Hanamori (Japanese); Jalitza Delgado (English)
A female magical beast hunter.
Gible (ギーブル, Gīburu)
Voiced by: Hinata Tadokoro (Japanese); Matthew David Rudd (English)
An openly bisexual scarred dual-classed thief/mage and Lilyza's partner who develops a crush on Saitou.
Franlil (フランリル, Furanriru)
Voiced by: Ruriko Aoki (Japanese); Corey Pettit (English)
Franlil Nil Arnil is a high elf with - unlike most of her kind - underdeveloped magical abilities; hence she has chosen a career as a fighter. Highly confrontational, she likes to leap into close combat with her trademark taloned gauntlets.
Ninia (ニニア)
Voiced by: Azusa Tadokoro (Japanese); Macy Anne Johnson (English)
Franlil's companion, a female cleric with rather weak magical abilities. She is a blood fetishist, and cares for Franlil both as a love interest and means of satisfying her cravings.
Cains (カインズ, Kainzu)
Voiced by: Yoshitsugu Matsuoka (Japanese); Kieran Flitton (English)
A rather plain fighter who is labeled by the kingdom's officials as an idol hero.
Lychee (ライチ, Raichi)
Voiced by: Yu Serizawa (Japanese); Hannah Alyea (English)
An average-level sorceress with a dislike for reptiles who is labeled by the kingdom's officials as an idol hero.
Monpui (モンプイ)
Voiced by: Chikara Honda
A round-faced, cowardly and deceitful cleric and the nephew of the king's high priest who is labeled by the kingdom's officials as an idol hero. His actual name is Montil Puitt (モンティル・ピュイット, Montiru Pyuitto), which is, however, commonly abbreviated to the form given above. He later turns over a new leaf after befriending Saitou and the Hero.
Kisurugi (キスルギ)
Voiced by: Jun Kasama
A powerful ninja assassin who has the ability of "shadow-binding", i.e. to paralyze anyone whose shadow he steps on.
Primas (プリマス, Purimasu)
Voiced by: Shiori Izawa (Japanese); Celeste Perez (English)
A chubby black crystal fairy mage, Lavella's best friend and Kisurugi's partner.
Lavella (ラーヴェラ, Rāvera)
Voiced by: Chiwa Saitō (Japanese); Morgan Garrett (English)
A 400-year-old witch who falls in love with Kisurugi. Originally kept young through a demon's curse, she has begun to age again after she falls in love with Kisurugi.
King Maderaka
Voiced by: Katsuji Mori
The King of the realm which includes the Great Labyrinth. Despite his age, he is immensely powerful, as he succeeded in defeating the demon king by himself.
Demon King Dorg (魔王 ドルグ)
Voiced by: Shigeru Chiba (Japanese); Chris Rager (English)
A Demon King who was defeated by King Maderaka, down to his still-living head, and thereafter became friends with him. He continues adventuring, mostly in the King's interest, using an artificial body which allows him to pass as a human knight.

== Media ==
=== Manga ===
Handyman Saitou in Another World is written and illustrated by Kazutomo Ichitomo. The series began serialization online via Kadokawa Shoten's ComicWalker website in October 2018. It has been collected in fifteen volumes as of September 18, 2026. At Anime NYC 2022, Yen Press announced that they licensed the manga for English publication.

No.	Original release date	Original ISBN	English release date	English ISBN
1	July 22, 2019	978-4-04-065896-4	June 20, 2023	978-1-9753-6467-0
2	December 23, 2019	978-4-04-064332-8	September 19, 2023	978-1-9753-6469-4
3	August 21, 2020	978-4-04-064932-0	January 23, 2024	978-1-9753-6472-4
4	January 22, 2021	978-4-04-680144-9	May 21, 2024	978-1-9753-6473-1
5	June 23, 2021	978-4-04-680525-6	August 20, 2024	978-1-9753-8863-8
6	January 21, 2022	978-4-04-680927-8	February 18, 2025	978-1-9753-9126-3
7	July 23, 2022	978-4-04-681642-9	June 24, 2025	978-1-9753-9128-7
8	December 23, 2022	978-4-04-682043-3	October 28, 2025	978-1-9753-9130-0
9	June 23, 2023	978-4-04-682415-8	May 26, 2026	978-1-9753-9132-4
10	December 22, 2023	978-4-04-683057-9	November 24, 2026	979-8-8554-0128-8
11	July 22, 2024	978-4-04-683671-7	February 23, 2027	979-8-8554-4877-1
12	December 23, 2024	978-4-04-684296-1	—	—
13	July 23, 2025	978-4-04-684898-7	—	—
14	January 23, 2026	978-4-04-685512-1	—	—
15	September 18, 2026	978-4-04-660345-6	—	—
Gaiden	September 18, 2026	978-4-04-660346-3	—	—

=== Anime ===
On January 19, 2022, an anime television series adaptation was announced. It is produced by C2C and directed by Toshiyuki Kubooka, with scripts written by Kenta Ihara, character designs handled by Yōko Tanabe, and music composed by Tomotaka Ōsumi. The series aired from January 8 to March 26, 2023, on AT-X and other networks. The opening theme song, "kaleidoscope", is performed by Teary Planet, while the ending theme song, "Hidamari no Saido" (ひだまりの彩度; "Sunny Spot's Saturation"), is performed by Konoco. Crunchyroll has licensed the series.

No.	Title	Directed by	Written by	Storyboarded by	Original release date
1	"Handyman, Saitou"; Transliteration: "Benriya, Saitō-san" (Japanese: 便利屋、斎藤さん)	Kōji Nagatomi	Kenta Ihara	Toshiyuki Kubooka	January 8, 2023
Saitou, a handyman from Japan displaced into another world, proves his helpfulness to the adventuring party he has joined, which includes Raelza the fighter, fairy priestess Lafanpan, and the aged wizard Morlock. The rest of the episode includes brief descriptions of the other party members and the world he has landed into.
2	"What Saitou Can Do"; Transliteration: "Saitō-san ga Dekiru Koto" (Japanese: 斎藤さんが出来ること)	Tsutomu Yabuki	Kenta Ihara	Hiroki Ikeshita	January 15, 2023
As Saitou continues adventuring, he finds that even a new life in another world is not without mishaps and quirky events. He ends up killing - and cooking - a hydra eel after Raelza's phobia of slimy creatures prevents her from fighting it; Franlil and Ninia are introduced; Maderaka, the King of the realm ends up friends with Demon King Dorg's decapitated but still-living head; Saitou learns about the curse the Moon Goddess has put on Lafanpan's people, and is saved from dying by Raelza after helping to vanquish an iron golem.
3	"Adventurers in the Great Labyrinth"; Transliteration: "Dai Meikyū no Bōkensha-tachi" (Japanese: 大迷宮の冒険者たち)	Satoshi Saga	Kenta Ihara	Toshiyuki Kubooka, Hiroki Ikeshita, Kōji Nagatomi	January 22, 2023
This episode is a collection of short stories detailing certain quirks about the other world and its inhabitants, including how adventuring in a peaceful kingdom has affected social and political dynamics. The king's advisors form a party of idol heroes. The assassin Kisurugi and the witch Lavella are introduced. Saitou makes the acquaintance of Donbain, a reclusive dwarven mastersmith, after easily breaking through his 108-lock door. In the Great Labyrinth, the kingdom's main adventuring grounds, Saitou finds both a vacuum robot from Earth and a hidden passage which leads to an as yet unexplored part of the dungeons, thus reviving the kingdom's flagging adventuring business.
4	"The Dawn of a New Era"; Transliteration: "Atarashii Jidai no Makuake" (Japanese: 新しい時代の幕開け)	Tadahito Matsubayashi	Kenta Ihara	Yoriyasu Kogawa	January 29, 2023
Dorg and Maderaka's Minister are two of the first to delve into the revitalized Labyrinth, but are later attacked and temporarily killed by Kisurugi. Saitou's group meets the kingdom's idol party and the adventuring duo Lilyza and Gible, and Raelza develops a rivalry with Franlil. While delving deeper into the Labyrinth, Saitou comes upon a cave filled with artefacts from all over Earth's eras and cultures; they are attacked by Kisurugi and Primas, but are saved by Gibungle, who then addresses Morlock as his former mentor.
5	"Ninja and Witch"; Transliteration: "Ninja to Majo" (Japanese: 忍者と魔女)	Yūsaku Saotome	Kenta Ihara	Hiroki Ikeshita, Shinpei Nagai	February 5, 2023
Morlock is shown to suffer from apparent amnesia, possibly due to the influence of forbidden magic he tried to investigate 20 years ago. Before Gibungle can rouse the mage's memory further, the party is attacked by Kisurugi, who desperately seeks ancient time magic hidden inside the Labyrinth to save Lavella from dying of old age. The ninja is thwarted by Lilyza, Gible, Franlil, Ninia and the idol adventurers. To help Lavella, Primas rips off her own wings to release the magic stored within, thus turning them all into a powerful dark spirit.
6	"Memories of an Old Sorcerer"; Transliteration: "Rō Majutsushi no Kioku" (Japanese: 老魔術師の記憶)	Tsutomu Yabuki	Kenta Ihara	Tsutomu Yabuki	February 12, 2023
The adventurers team up to combat the common threat, but are unable to damage the dark spirit. Saitou remembers finding a secret magic formula which can manipulate time in one of Morlock's books. It is revealed that Morlock, in his ambition to be recognized as a great mage, lost his daughter to a heavy fever after neglecting her. He then entered the Great Labyrinth to find Crom, a legendary mage who created time magic, in order to bring his daughter back to life, but lost his challenge, whereupon Crom stripped him off his memories. Theorizing that it was Morlock who had called him into this world, Saitou helps the old wizard in casting the spell, which freezes everyone but Morlock in time.
7	"Extreme Contact"; Transliteration: "Kyokugen no Sesshoku" (Japanese: 極限の接触)	Kōji Nagatomi	Kenta Ihara	Kagetsu Aizawa	February 19, 2023
In the 100 seconds the time-stop spell has granted him, Morlock tries to destroy the dark spirit, but instead has an insight into its motive and cancels the magic upon them, separating them into their individual entities and giving them the chance to atone. The revived Dorg and Royal Minister join them, and Morlock is forced to crush Kisurugi's ambitions when he explains that Crom had left this world after growing tired of it. The Minister explains that King Maderaka can restore Lavella's youth if a life connected to her is sacrificed. Knowing he will face the death penalty for his slayings anyway, Kisurugi volunteers his own, and with the agreement of the other adventurers, the Minister and Dorg take Kisurugi with them.
8	"What I Gained from the Battle"; Transliteration: "Tatakai de Eta Mono" (Japanese: 戦いで得たもの)	Hiroki Ikeshita	Kenta Ihara	Tetsuya Endō	February 26, 2023
Instead of getting killed, Kisurugi and Primasse are crippled until their sacrificed life essence restores Lavella youth, but she loses her memory. About to leave her alone, Kisurugi is reprimanded by Primasse, inspiring him to start his life anew at Lavella's side. In the Labyrinth, the other-worldly artefacts conjured by Crom are confiscated by the crown, but Morlock has regained part of his memories, including how he had accidentally called Saitou into this world. With the chances of returning him to Earth being very slim, and having nothing to return for anyway, Saitou decides to stay in this world, and Raelza confesses her affection for him. Right afterwards, however, Morlock is bitten by a venomous monster and dies soon after.
9	"Sad Dog Warrior"; Transliteration: "Kanashiki Inu no Senshi" (Japanese: 悲しき犬の戦士)	Yūsaku Saotome	Kenta Ihara	Kagetsu Aizawa	March 5, 2023
After having fallen in love with a female white wolf, who was killed by his master's orders after leaving a single cub as their offspring, a demon wolf has exiled himself to the mortal world. Morlock surprisingly rises from his grave due to a one-time revival spell he had cast on himself long ago, but he returns in an undead form because the demon wolf has devoured one of his body parts, making the magic incomplete. Gibungle helps out with his former master's magical journal, which states that the body part must be retrieved to make the spell successful. As they look for the demon wolf, Morlock reveals how Raelza had lost her parents and she came to him, and asks Saitou to take care of her if he does not make it.
10	"Tracker of the Demon World"; Transliteration: "Makai no Tsuisekisha" (Japanese: 魔界の追跡者)	Kazunobu Shimizu	Kenta Ihara	Shinpei Nagai	March 12, 2023
Maddened by the magical energy in Morlock's flesh, the demon wolf attacks and wounds Saitou and Morlock. Raelza manages to injure it, but the appearance of its pup brings it back to its senses, and it asks Raelza to kill it. A minion of the wolf's former master arrives to bring it back to the netherrealm, but Saitou, Raelza and Lafanpan fight it until the demon lord itself arrives to claim Morlock's magic for its own. When Raelza engages it and is imperiled, Saitou carries Morlock's body close to the demon wolf and then intervenes to save her. Morlock asks the wolf to return of his magic in exchange for looking after the wolf's pup. Fully restored, Morlock beats the demon; but as he appears before his companions, he suddenly sports a pair of dog ears and a tail.
11	"The Final Battle"; Transliteration: "Saishū Kessen" (Japanese: 最終決戦)	Hiro Ōki	Kenta Ihara	Takayuki Inagaki	March 19, 2023
With his magic combined with the demon wolf's essence, Morlock temporarily regains his youth and engages the demon lord when the latter promptly returns for revenge. The demon proves too tough even for the mightiest magic Morlock can summon, but before it can attack the companions, the wolf pup intervenes and slays it. Unwilling to leave the pup fatherless, Morlock returns the wolf's essence to free it from its bondage to the demon lord, giving up his life force to restore him. In gratitude, the demon wolf offers to settle the debt one day, which the grieving Raelza refuses.
12	"The One Who Needs It Most"; Transliteration: "Ichiban Hitsuyō Toshite Iru Hito" (Japanese: いちばん必要としている人)	Kōji Nagatomi	Kenta Ihara	Shinji Ishihira	March 26, 2023
The next day, Saitou awakes from his injuries to find that Morlock has completely recovered, and he finally acknowledges his own feelings for Raelza. Otherwise, his life as an adventurer returns pretty much to normal, except for a few unexpected new developments. The most important ones are that Saitou has finally won more confidence in himself, and that his exploits have made him so famous that all his friends and the people in the kingdom begin approaching him and asking him for his skills as a handyman, making him feel fulfilled at last.

== See also ==
- Shed that Skin, Ryugasaki-san!, another manga series by Kazutomo Ichitomo
