= I May Be a Guild Receptionist, But I'll Solo Any Boss to Clock Out on Time =

Japanese light novel series

- First light novel volume cover of the original edition

ギルドの受付嬢ですが、残業は嫌なのでボスをソロ討伐しようと思います (Guild no Uketsukejō desu ga, Zangyō wa Iya na node Boss o Solo Tōbatsu Shiyō to Omoi masu)
- Genre: Adventure; Fantasy comedy
- Light novel
- Written by: Mato Kousaka
- Illustrated by: Gaou (original edition); Icomochi (new edition)
- Published by: ASCII Media Works
- English publisher: NA: Yen Press
- Imprint: Dengeki Bunko
- Original run: March 10, 2021 – present
- Volumes: 8
- Manga
- Written by: Mato Kousaka
- Illustrated by: Suzu Yūki
- Published by: ASCII Media Works
- English publisher: NA: Yen Press
- Magazine: Dengeki Daioh
- Original run: June 28, 2021 – present
- Volumes: 7
- Anime television series
- Directed by: Tsuyoshi Nagasawa
- Written by: Misuzu Chiba
- Music by: Tsubasa Ito
- Studio: CloverWorks (Note: Animation production assistance (アニメーション制作協力) for all episodes provided by Sakura Create.)
- Licensed by: Crunchyroll; SA/SEA: Medialink
- Original network: Tokyo MX, GYT, GTV, BS11, ABC, TVA, AT-X
- Original run: January 11, 2025 – March 29, 2025
- Episodes: 12
- icon

I May Be a Guild Receptionist, But I'll Solo Any Boss to Clock Out on Time (Japanese: ギルドの受付嬢ですが、残業は嫌なのでボスをソロ討伐しようと思います, Hepburn: Guild no Uketsukejō desu ga, Zangyō wa Iya na node Boss o Solo Tōbatsu Shiyō to Omoi masu), also known as Girumasu (ギルます) for short, is a Japanese light novel series written by Mato Kousaka and illustrated by Gaou (original edition) and Icomochi (new edition). ASCII Media Works began publishing the series under their Dengeki Bunko imprint in March 2021. A manga adaptation illustrated by Suzu Yūki began serialization in Dengeki Daioh magazine in June 2021. An anime television series adaptation produced by CloverWorks aired from January to March 2025.

== Plot ==
Alina Clover became an adventurer guild receptionist because she thought it would be an easy and secure job, but unfortunately for her she also now has the vexing task of dealing with meatheads and egotists, having to remind them of regulations; plus her coworkers constantly dump their unfinished share of the work on her, causing her to work unpaid overtime. It does not help that Dungeon bosses are unbeatable for long periods of time, which leads to more paperwork. Secretly, Alina has moments when she unintentionally snaps and, with a recently-acquired divine skill which allows her to summon a powerful hammer, disguises herself to go after the bosses herself, venting all her frustrations on the monster.

The leader of an adventurer group takes notice of her and is determined to recruit her into his party. However, facing potential dismissal from her stable job due to unauthorized outside work, Alina must find a way to avoid involvement.

== Characters ==
=== Main ===
Alina Clover (アリナ・クローバー, Arina Kurōbā)
Voiced by: Rie Takahashi (Japanese); Jill Harris (English)
A young receptionist at the Iffole Counter, having worked there for three years. She has a first-class license, given to the top 10% of those with powers. Though she herself does not understand why she can use her divine realm skills, she has the power to destroy relics with one hand, which makes her an extremely powerful fighter; it is later revealed that she was granted a Dia skill, which matches the level of a god. However, Dark Gods are strong enough to fight back against her as they also possess Dia skills.
In order to live a carefree life, Alina finishes overtime work the same day, as she grew tired of rolling it over to the next day. She always thinks about eliminating her overtime work and even directly negotiates with the guild master Glen. She is constantly annoyed by Jade's support and willingness to help her out in any way he can, resenting the fact that he seems more competent than her, but is unaware of his romantic feelings for her; nevertheless, she eventually grows to respect and care for him as the story progresses. She also attracts the attention of many other male characters throughout the series due to her good looks, much to Jade's dismay and jealousy.
Also known as the "Executioner", though she uses the alias "Rovelc Anila" on paperwork. So far, Jade, Laila (she does not find out in the anime), the Silver Sword, Glen, Fili, and the guild guards are the only people who know her secret.
Jade Scrade (ジェイド・スクレイド, Jeido Sukureido)
Voiced by: Kentarō Kumagai (Japanese); Kamen Casey (English)
Leader and shield/tank of the Silver Sword. He is dexterous and helps Alina with her overtime work. The first adventurer to develop multiple super-range skills, he can also double activate his own skills. He falls in love with Alina at first sight, and constantly tries to woo her and get her to join his team as he knows of her secret identity, though she always refuses and avoids him. He is also shown to get very jealous whenever other men approach Alina in attempts to flirt with or woo her. Despite this, he is nevertheless supportive of her as he does not tell anyone of her secret. He did succeed in getting her to join his team at one point, but it was only temporarily as he was forced to dismiss her by Rufus.
Laila (ライラ, Raira)
Voiced by: Yū Serizawa (Japanese); Sarah Wiedenheft (English)
Alina's junior and a new receptionist. She has a crush on the Executioner, but is later shocked to find out it is actually Alina. There is a magic circle carved into her arm. In the anime, she never learns of Alina's secret.

=== Supporting ===
==== Silver Sword ====
An adventurer party, hailed as the strongest. If results are not achieved, members are replaced. There are currently three people led by Jade. They also own a private inn. Like their leader, they know that Alina is the Executioner.

Lowe Losblender (ロウ・ロズブレンダ, Rou Rozuburenda)
Voiced by: Rikuya Yasuda (Japanese); Dakota Farnsworth (English)
A black mage who can use powerful attack magic, and serves as the rear guard/back attacker of the Silver Sword. He is a good friend of Jade, and it is hinted he might have feelings for Lululee, but never acknowledges them.
Lululee Ashford (ルルリ・アシュフォード, Rururi Ashufōdo)
Voiced by: Aoi Koga (Japanese); Kate Bristol (English)
A young healer with a traumatic past. Two members of her previous party were wiped out by a floor boss. When both members of the vanguard were gravely injured, due to the tank losing the boss' aggression, she could not bear the thought she could only save one of them, so she insufficiently attempted to heal both of them. Since she failed to fully heal them, the tank of the party lost an arm and an eye to the floor boss with the vanguard losing their lives. The tank resents her to the point of calling her a murderer, while taking no responsibility for failing to keep the boss's aggression.
Ganz (ガンズ, Ganzu)
Voiced by: Shōhei Tabuchi (Japanese); Mike Smith (English)
Former attacker who retired after seeing the Executioner's skills. He has a second-class adventurer license.
Lynn Leeche (リン・リーチェ, Rin Rīche)
Voiced by: Ari Ozawa (Japanese); Nia Celeste (English)
Healer for Glen when he was a member of the Silver Sword, and his adopted daughter. After clearing the ground floor of the Fortress of Ashes, she was burned alive in the basement room, right in front of Glen.

==== Guild members ====
The Adventurers' Guild is a guild that mainly accepts dungeon orders. The guild headquarters used to be the S-class dungeon Fortress of Ashes before being cleared by Silver Sword led by Glen. Alongside Glen and Fili, the guards also know that Alina is the Executioner, but are ordered to not tell anyone by their boss.

Glen Garia (グレン・ガリア, Guren Garia)
Voiced by: Kenichirou Matsuda (Japanese); Brian Mathis (English)
Guild master. Former member of the Silver Sword. Can use the super-range skill Time Observer, which leads him to discover that Alina is the Executioner, who is also immune to his skill. While active, he was shunned by fellow adventurers and was cold, stubborn, and selfish, but the presence of his adopted daughter changed his personality. At one point, his party members and daughter were reduced to ashes after being killed by a boss. He retired when he was 25 and became guild master soon after. In order to revive his deceased daughter, he planned to travel back in time and manipulates Rufus, Heitz, Silver Sword, and Alina to help him obtain a dark god’s core. Once that is done, he steals and fits the core into his left hand, which mutated his super-range skill; however, this corrupts and transforms him into a dark god. Although he overpowers Silver Sword and Alina, the latter eventually defeats him and turns him back to normal. It is later discovered that he was a pawn to a mysterious individual who can also use a Dia skill.
Fili (フィリ, Firi)
Voiced by: Ryōka Yuzuki
Glen's secretary. Like her boss, she also learns that Alina is the Executioner.
Shelley (シェリー, Sherī)
Voiced by: Aya Hisakawa (Japanese); Mallorie Rodak (English)
Member of the guild's research group. She is a leading expert in relic research and has invented guiding crystal shards and virtual image construction devices.

==== Dark Gods ====
Evil humanoid beings that possess many Dia skills, making them very powerful individuals. They feed on human souls to incarnate and get stronger. Should one be killed, another will be reborn to take its place. They are one of the only monsters that even Alina struggles to defeat on her own as their capabilities matched hers. It is later revealed that they were once humans, who were corrupted by the dark god's cores.

Silha (シルハ, Shiruha)
Voiced by: Ryōta Takeuchi (Japanese); Nic Hamill (English)
The first Dark God that Alina and Silver Sword encounters. He was freed by Rufus, who slayed his own group and tricked Silver Sword into helping him with the intention of feeding their souls to him in return for a Dia skill, but Silha kills Rufus instead, revealing that he never intended to help him at all. Although he overwhelms Silver Sword and Alina, he meets his end at the hands of Alina and Jade.
Viena (ヴィエナ) and Fiena (フィエナ)
Voiced by: Maria Naganawa (Viena) and Misaki Watada (Fiena) (Japanese); Molly Zhang (Viena) and Monica Flatley (Fiena) (English)
Although they look like young girls, they are very powerful and their bodies are made of slime-like substances that enables them to quickly regenerate. They can also merge into a more powerful being called Vilfina, which makes them stronger, but also weakens their intelligence. They were unleashed by Heitz, whom they then kill. Although they manage to overpower Alina and Silver Sword, they are ultimately killed by Alina while merged since they must be killed at the same time to defeat them for good.

==== Others ====
Slay Ghost (スレイ・ゴースト, Surei Gōsuto)
Voiced by: Jun Fukushima (Japanese); Spencer Liles (English)
A very antagonistic adventurer. Following a confrontation with Jade and Alina, he revives Clay Golem to get revenge on them, but is defeated by Alina.
Rufus (ルーフェス, Rūfesu)
Voiced by: Yūga Satō (Japanese); Kristian Eros (English)
A power-hungry adventurer who seeks to gain a Dia skill. He kills his own party members and manipulates Silver Sword into helping him free Silha in hopes of feeding their souls to him in exchange for a Dia skill while ensuring that Alina cannot interfere, but this backfires when he is killed by Silha instead, who then eats his soul. It is later discovered that he was manipulated by Glen.
Shroud (シュラウド, Shuraudo)
Voiced by: Yōhei Azakami (Japanese); Nicholas Markgraf (English)
An adventurer that Alina met in the past, who also died at one point.
Clay Golem
Voiced by: Masafumi Kobatake
A boss monster that Slay revived and tamed to get revenge on Jade and Alina, but they are both defeated by Alina.
Cybil (シビル, Shibiru)
Voiced by: Yūdai Mino (Japanese); Tom Cullum (English)
An adventurer who briefly became a member of Silver Sword, but quit the team to improve himself after his overconfidence and recklessness got him hurt during training.
Heitz (ハイツ, Haitsu)
Voiced by: Wataru Komada (Japanese); Jordan Dash Cruz (English)
A wicked adventurer who has been spreading rumors of secret quests with the intention of creating a new dark god so he can destroy the world after believing that it has been consumed into chaos by humanity, having been manipulated into doing this by a man in black, later revealed to be Glen. He is killed by Viena and Fiena.
Aiden (エイデン, Eiden)
Voiced by: Daisuke Nagumo
An adventurer who was once in the same party as Lululee, falsely accusing her for murder when she failed to heal their comrades properly due to her weak magic. He now works for Heitz.
Ricaide (リカイド, Rikaido)
Voiced by: Kazuya Saji (Japanese); Adam Rowe (English)
One of Heitz's men.
Jessica (ジェシカ, Jeshika)
Voiced by: Sayaka Ōhara (Japanese); Morgan Garrett (English)
A member of the Information Broker's Guild.
Rosetta Rhuberry (ロゼッタ・ルーベリー, Rozetta Rūberī)
Voiced by: Mami Horikoshi (Japanese); Erin Nicole Lundquist (English)
The woman who founded the modern guild receptionist business.

== Media ==
=== Light novel ===
The series began publication under ASCII Media Works's Dengeki Bunko imprint in March 2021; eight volumes have been released as of August 2024. During their panel at Sakura-Con 2023, Yen Press announced that they licensed the light novel. In July 2025, it was announced illustrator Gaou had been replaced due to him admitting to having a sexual relationship with a minor. On October 3, 2026, it was announced Icomochi replaced Gaou as the illustrator. It was also announced a new edition of the series would be released in early 2027.

No.	Original release date	Original ISBN	English release date	English ISBN
1	March 10, 2021	978-4-04-913688-3	September 19, 2023	978-1-9753-6946-0
2	July 9, 2021	978-4-04-913871-9	January 30, 2024	978-1-9753-6948-4
3	November 10, 2021	978-4-04-913937-2	June 18, 2024	978-1-9753-6950-7
4	March 10, 2022	978-4-04-914144-3	November 5, 2024	978-1-9753-6952-1
5	July 8, 2022	978-4-04-914534-2	September 16, 2025 (canceled)	979-8-8554-0727-3
6	January 7, 2023	978-4-04-914813-8	—	—
7	June 9, 2023	978-4-04-915121-3	—	—
8	August 9, 2024	978-4-04-915345-3	—	—

=== Manga ===
A manga adaptation illustrated by Suzu Yūki began serialization in ASCII Media Works' Dengeki Daioh magazine on June 28, 2021. The manga adaptation is also licensed by Yen Press.

No.	Original release date	Original ISBN	English release date	English ISBN
1	February 10, 2022	978-4-04-914263-1	October 17, 2023	978-1-9753-6576-9
2	October 7, 2022	978-4-04-914652-3	February 20, 2024	978-1-9753-7137-1
3	June 9, 2023	978-4-04-915105-3	June 18, 2024	978-1-9753-9460-8
4	February 9, 2024	978-4-04-915500-6	February 18, 2025	979-8-8554-0783-9
5	October 10, 2024	978-4-04-915971-4	December 16, 2025	979-8-8554-2029-6
6	June 10, 2025	978-4-04-916456-5	February 23, 2027	979-8-8554-3520-7
7	February 27, 2026	978-4-04-916986-7	—	—
8	November 27, 2026	978-4-04-952567-0	—	—

=== Anime ===
An anime adaptation was announced at the Dengeki Bunko 30th anniversary event on July 15, 2023. It was later revealed to be a television series produced by CloverWorks and directed by Tsuyoshi Nagasawa, with series composition by Misuzu Chiba, and character designs by Yoshihiro Osada and Shinichi Machida, and music composed by Tsubasa Ito. The series, initially scheduled for 2024, was later delayed, and eventually aired from January 11 to March 29, 2025, on Tokyo MX and other networks. (Note: Tokyo MX lists the series premiere on January 10, 2025, at 24:00, which is effectively January 11 at midnight JST.) The opening theme song is "Perfect Day", performed by 310, while the ending theme song is "Ashita no Watashi ni Sachi Are" (明日の私に幸あれ; May the Future Me Be Happy), performed by Akari Nanawo. Crunchyroll streamed the series. Medialink licensed the series in South and Southeast Asia.

==== Episodes ====
No.	Title	Directed by	Written by	Storyboarded by	Original release date
1	"I'm a Guild Receptionist, so I Want a Peaceful Life"; Transliteration: "Girudo no Uketsukejō nano de, Heion na Seikatsu o Shitai to Omoi masu" (Japanese: ギルドの受付嬢なので、平穏な生活をしたいと思います)	Masahiko Matsunaga	Misuzu Chiba	Tsuyoshi Nagasawa	January 11, 2025
Alina is a young guild receptionist at Iffole Counter, a job she took for the working hours that let her go home on time every day. Unfortunately, adventurers often take too long to complete quests, causing her to work overtime. Recently, a Hellflame Dragon has appeared as a dungeon boss that no one can defeat, adding to Alina's workload. Losing her temper, Alina enters the dungeon as her secret adventurer persona, "The Executioner". Wielding an impossibly large hammer, she kills the dragon, hoping this will reduce her workload. Unfortunately, her actions cause the adventurer Gans to retire. In response, the guild opens an investigation to find Executioner and force her to replace Gans by joining Silver Sword. Alina panics since discovery would mean losing her comfortable job for issuing herself a fake adventurer license. Silver Sword's leader Jade recognizes her due to his sharp senses and gifts her the dragon's Relic, a crystal containing a skill bestowed by the Dia Gods in ancient times. Despite Relics being famously indestructible, Alina crushes it and threatens Jade not to interfere with her peaceful job or ability to go home on time, refusing to join his team while also warning him to not tell anyone about her secret identity. Jade is determined not to give up trying to recruit her. Alina looks forward to going home, until a bullying adventurer starts causing trouble and bullying Alina's apprentice Laila, making Alina fear that she will have to work overtime again.
2	"I May Be the Executioner, but I'll Be Fired if People Find Out, so I'll Have to Use Force"; Transliteration: "Shōkei-nin desu ga, Shōtai ga Bareru to Kubi nano de Jitsuryoku Kōshi Shiyō to Omoi masu" (Japanese: 処刑人ですが、正体がバレるとクビなので実力行使しようと思います)	Katsuhiko Bizen	Misuzu Chiba	Yui Miura	January 18, 2025
The bully, Slay, demands access to the guilds rumoured "secret quests", and begins to harass Alina. An enraged Jade throws him out and explains to Alina that her unusual hammer is a Dia skill; a God bestowed ability. Though she will not tell Jade of her past, Alina recalls two years previously while working overtime she missed Iffole's Centennial Festival. Angry at the guild, useless adventurers and boss monsters, she prayed for the power to avoid overtime and was miraculously granted the hammer. Slay decides to get revenge on Jade and Alina by reactivating a captured boss monster, Clay Golem, who overwhelms Jade. Alina is enraged when her house is destroyed and as the Executioner, she crushes Golem and almost kills Slay. Guild-master Glen uses a time manipulation skill at where the Executioner defeated Golem. While helping Alina with her work, Jade discovers the Relic Alina crushed contained a secret quest to defeat every boss monster at the Chalk Tower. Alina refuses to acknowledge the quest, seeing it as more work. Jade decides to investigate. Alina is disturbed that Laila believes Executioner is a man, and has a crush on "him". Glen summons Alina to the guild headquarters, having discovered her identity as the Executioner. Alina blames Jade for her identity being revealed and begins to resent him even more, much to Jade's heartbreak and despair. Jade's teammates Lowe and Lululee realize Jade has a crush on Alina, which leaves them dumbfounded. Instead of talking, Glen challenges Alina to a duel, leaving her baffled.
3	"I May Be Silver Sword's Tank, but I Want to Take On a Really Tough Dungeon"; Transliteration: "Hakugin no Tanku desu ga, Yabai Danjon ni Idomō to Omoi masu" (Japanese: 白銀の盾役(タンク)ですが、ヤバいダンジョンに挑もうと思います)	Rintarō Ogawa	Misaki Morie	Kazuya Komai	January 25, 2025
Glen demands if he wins, Alina will join Silver Sword, but if she wins, her identity will remain secret. Alina attacks, so he freezes time for an easy victory, but when Alina is unaffected, he admits defeat. Alina reminds him to leave her alone like he agreed. Glen reveals they found the Chalk Tower dungeon. Alina is furious as a new dungeon means more work for her. Seeing that she hates working overtime, Glen offers to hire more receptionists if she helps defeat the Chalk Tower dungeon. Alina reluctantly agrees and moves into Silver Sword headquarters with Jade, Lululee, and Lowe. Inside Chalk Tower, they discover the adventurer Rufus whose teammates were all killed. He yells at Alina as the human-looking monster that killed his friends used a Dia skill like hers, although he does not know that she is the Executioner. Glen considers sealing the Tower, but Rufus threatens to tell everyone that the Executioner is the human-shaped monster unless they kick her out of Silver Sword, defeat the Tower, and give him the dungeon relic that he is sure contains a Dia skill. Forced to agree, Jade tells Alina she is out of Silver Sword. Alina is unhappy and that night dreams of an adventurer named Shroud she knew as a child, who died despite his promise to always come back. Silver Sword find the human-shaped monster, who reveals himself as the Dark God Silha. Rufus traps Jade, Lowe, and Lululee, revealing he killed his own party to awaken Silha and got rid of Alina so he could give Silha their souls in exchange for a Dia skill without any interference. Silha devours Rufus’ soul instead, freeing Silver Sword, and prepares to devour their souls too.
4	"Relics, Secret Quests, or Dark Gods Will Get in the Way of My Work, so I'll Beat Them Up"; Transliteration: "Rerikku toka Ura-kuesuto toka Majin toka Gyōmu no Jama nano de, Buttobasō to Omoi masu" (Japanese: 遺物(レリック)とか裏クエストとか魔神とか業務の邪魔なので、ブッ飛ばそうと思います)	Masahiko Matsunaga	Misuzu Chiba	Kazuya Komai	February 1, 2025
Silha reveals he has several Dia skills, including one that can steal skills from others, so he takes Lululee's healing skill. Jade challenges Silha to duel while his comrades flee, but they are confronted by a monster. A relic Jade gave Alina warns her Jade is close to death. Knowing he will die soon, Jade remembers everything about Alina he loves. When she is denied access to the dungeon by the guild guards, Alina summons her hammer in front of the guards and forces her way into the Tower, saving Silver Sword along the way, but finds Jade already seemly dead. Furious, she attacks Silha, who is surprised a human possesses a Dia skill as powerful as his own. He injures Alina, who is saved from death by the still-alive Jade, who was just playing dead. Silha reveals it was himself that killed the ancient humans and devoured their souls, so there are none who can surpass him. Determined that all adventurers be allowed to return home safely, Alina activates a power that covers her in golden flames. She obliterates Silha in one blow so he has no time to heal. Before disappearing completely, Silha warns that another Dark God will simply rise to replace him. Lululee gets her healing back following Silha's death, and she heals her teammates. Alina fears she will be fired for revealing her identity, but Glen hushes everything up, having ordered the guards to not tell anyone about her secret, and Alina returns to work as though nothing happened. Jade is thrilled when Alina lets him help with paperwork, even if it is just so she can go home on time.
5	"I May Be Silver Sword's Healer, but Even I Could Use Some Healing"; Transliteration: "Hakugin no Hīrā desu ga, Watashi ni mo Iyashi ga Hoshii to Omō no desu" (Japanese: 白銀の回復役(ヒーラー)ですが、私にも癒やしが欲しいと思うのです)	Rintarō Ogawa	Misaki Morie	Noriyuki Nakamura	February 8, 2025
Alina reveals during the festival the guild offers extra compensation for quests, so adventurers always swarm the guild, making it impossible to avoid overtime. Lululee takes time to thank Alina for saving them from Silha. As Lululee heads back, a mysterious man wearing an eyepatch watches her. Laila, who hopes for a date with the Executioner, believes Alina's enthusiasm for the festival is because it is popular with couples, and is shocked that Alina actually plans to go alone. Alina and Laila become swamped when adventurers swarm the guild despite the festival still being days away. Silver Sword begins training their reckless new swordsman Cybil, but when he is injured, Lululee suffers a panic attack from the memory of Silha. Alina interrupts their training as the Executioner, accidentally causing Cybil to quit to get stronger, and demands to know why the adventurers are already so busy. Glen reveals a rumor that one of the guilds supposed "secret quests" will reward a relic that grants a Dia skill, but they are doing their best to deny the rumor. Jade asks Lululee about her panic attack, but she claims it was just nerves from using a new magic staff. Lowe reveals he and Jade had her original staff repaired after Silha destroyed it. Glen concludes someone started the rumor so adventurers would seek out new dungeons and accidentally become sacrifices to revive a new Dark God to replace Silha. Jade offers to help Alina finish her work in exchange for a date to the festival. Facing a mountain of paperwork and overtime, Alina unwillingly agrees.
6	"I May Be Silver Sword's Back Attacker, but I'm Gonna Catch the Jerk Who Started That Rumor"; Transliteration: "Hakugin no Bakku Atakkā desu ga, Dema Yarō o Tottsukamaeyō to Omoi masu" (Japanese: 白銀の後衛役(バックアタッカー)ですが、デマ野郎を取っ捕まえようと思います)	Katsuhiko Bizen	Mio Inoue	Katsuhiko Bizen	February 15, 2025
Alina and Silver Sword disguise themselves as beginners and head to the area where most adventurers heard the rumor. The group stop at a lake to rest. They are approached by a party led by Heitz, who tells them the rumor of relics granting Dia skills, but Silver Sword and Alina reveal themselves. Alina loses her temper and Heitz and most of his group escape, except for the eyepatch man from earlier. Lululee recognizes him as Aiden, a former teammate who accuses her of murdering her old team. Alina beats him up and Jade exposes Heitz for creating the rumor. Laila is thrilled Jade is romantically pursuing Alina. The Guild Council are interested in the Executioner, but Glen respects Alina’s privacy and refuses to reveal who she is. Lululee confesses to Lowe the first team she ever joined were all fatally wounded by a boss monster. As she was still inexperienced she attempted to heal everyone, but without enough magic to share, everyone died except for Aidan. Jade begins a dangerous training regimen to activate multiple skills at once, but becomes ill. Guild researcher Shelley reveals that she has been studying Silha's dark god core and found it contains an infinite number of Dia Skills that can only be unlocked by devouring souls. She also reveals that someone else is still spreading rumors, a man in black wearing a mask. Alina finishes her paperwork, meaning she can attend the festival. To celebrate, she drags Jade to a bar. Becoming drunk, she mistakes Jade for Shroud before passing out. Jade wonders who Shroud is and why Alina claims to still be waiting for him to come back.
7	"I've Waited Forever for the Centennial Festival, So I'm Gonna Enjoy It, No Matter What"; Transliteration: "Machi ni Matta Hyakunen-sai nano de, Zettai ni Zettai ni Tanoshimō to Omoi masu" (Japanese: 待ちに待った百年祭なので、絶対に絶対に楽しもうと思います)	Rintarō Ogawa	Misuzu Chiba	Hirofumi Ogura	February 22, 2025
Glen is approached by Jessica of the Information Broker's Guild, who offers him a book containing a Secret Quest. Glen hides the book in the guild's labyrinth, the Archive. Meanwhile, the festival opens and Alina attends it with Jade. Lululee visits Aiden in prison, accompanied by Lowe. Jade and Alina get in an argument over Jade wanting to hold her hand and Alina eventually lets him, since he helped her avoid overtime. Aiden continues to blame Lululee for their party's deaths and swears to kill her once he has his own Dia skill, but Lowe comes to her defense as they leave. Aiden is broken out of prison by Heitz. The festival is disturbed by a performer, actually one of Heitz's goons in disguise, ambushes the guests, leading Alina to attack him in retaliation. Heitz retrieves the book from the Archive and accepts the Secret Quest, daring Silver Sword to come after him. Silver Sword is mobilized to prevent him from resurrecting another Dark God. Despite missing the festival, Alina volunteers to go with them. They enter the dungeon in the Forest of Eternity, where one of Heitz's men commits suicide to prevent Heitz from being captured. Aiden is horrified by this act. Heitz admits he hates the insane skill system, which dispenses good and bad skills at random, ruining people's lives, so he will resurrect a Dark God to destroy the unfair world; he was advised to do this by a man in black. Heitz is suddenly murdered by the Dark Gods, childlike twin sisters Viena and Fiena. Alina crushes both of them, but finds their bodies as soft as slimes and capable of regenerating instantly.
8	"I May Be a Useless Healer, but I'm Going to Do Everything I Can"; Transliteration: "Fugainai Hīrā desu ga, Watashi no Dekiru Koto o Mattō Shiyō to Omō no desu" (Japanese: ふがいない回復役(ヒーラー)ですが、私のできることを全うしようと思うのです)	Masahiko Matsunaga	Misaki Morie	Nao Kise	March 1, 2025
Jade deduces both Gods must be destroyed at the same time. He also shows that his dangerous training allows him to block skills with his shield. Viena and Fiena attempt to consume Aiden to begin unlocking Dia skills, but Lowe carries Aiden to safety. Both Gods combine into one God, Vilfina, who injures Alina with a curse. Lululee's healing has no effect and the Gods gloat Alina's death will unlock their first Dia skill. Jade insults them, pointing out they both only possess half the power of a Dark God, and even when they become Vilfina, they only gain strength by losing intelligence. Viena loses her temper at the insult. Feeling useless, Lululee desperately uses her healing multiple times. Lowe dumps Aiden outside the dungeon and threatens to murder him if he ever comes back to antagonize Lululee. Despite some struggles, Lululee eventually heals Alina's wound, which wears her out, allowing Alina to save Jade from death. Outraged that Alina is still alive, the Gods combine into Vilfina again, so Alina activates her golden flames and crushes her. As both Gods were in one body, they are destroyed at the exact same time and die permanently. Lululee is happy she saved someone and is able to move on from her guilt. Alina is able to return to the festival, where she tells Jade about Shroud and reminds him that he is not allowed to die. Other adventurers praise Alina as their favorite receptionist, though Alina realizes this is why she has so much work, because the adventurers ignore the other receptionists, giving Alina the most work. Having realized this, she yells at them about her overtime. At the end of the festival, everyone takes part in Soul's Rest, remembering deceased adventurers by releasing lanterns into the sky. Alina realizes she has not felt lonely in a long time.
9	"I May Be in My Third Year as a Guild Receptionist, but I'm Starting New-Employee Training"; Transliteration: "Uketsukejō San-nen Me desu ga, Shinjin-kenshū ni Ikō to Omoi masu" (Japanese: 受付嬢3年目ですが、新人研修に行こうと思います)	Masato Uchibori	Misaki Morie	Keisuke Ōnishi	March 8, 2025
Glen announces he will grant a holiday on their birthday to any receptionist who finds a way to reduce everyone's overtime. A training course is announced with Rosetta Rhuberry, the woman who inspired the modern receptionist career. Alina is determined to learn Rosetta's legendary paperwork processing ability as she helps Silver Sword clear another dungeon. Jade decides to attend the training without annoying Alina, hoping to impress her. Glen thanks Alina for defeating Vilfina, but she yells at him for delaying hiring the extra receptionists he promised. Jade gives a speech to the receptionists and Alina is impressed he did not embarrass her. For the training, the receptionists move into the guild's training hall rumored to be haunted. Laila wants Alina to win the holiday so Jade can plan her birthday party. She also expresses her desire for the Executioner to join Silver Sword and still has feelings for “him”; Alina urges Lululee to not tell her. Lululee suspects Alina actually misses Jade, though she denies it. Jade starts to wonder how Heitz got into the Archive and concludes someone in the guild is a traitor. Meeting Rosetta, Alina desperately asks how to avoid overtime. Rosetta reveals her trick is to not think of overtime as work, but as a joyful experience that makes the lives of hardworking adventurers easier, that way any receptionist can easily work 100 hours of overtime every month. Realizing Rosetta is not a fellow enemy of overtime, but a standard workaholic, Alina has a severe mental breakdown as she contemplates her future career filled with unavoidable overtime, leading her to believe going home on time is completely impossible.
10	"A Ghost May Show Up During Training, but Nobody Told Me About It"; Transliteration: "Kenshū-chū ni Obake ga deru no desu ga, Son'na no Kii te nai yotte Omoi masu" (Japanese: 研修中におばけが出るのですが、そんなの聞いてないよって思います)	Yūichi Nihei, Yui Miura	Misaki Morie	Rintarō Ogawa, Masahiko Matsunaga	March 15, 2025
Alina finds herself thinking about Jade, and how impressed she is of him not calling her by name throughout training. Jade is worried a Court of Inquiry believes he is not living up to the Silver Sword legacy. Glen, who led the previous Silver Sword until his daughter Lynn was killed, wants Jade to become the next Guild Master. Fili, Glen's secretary, deduces Jade suspects Glen of being the man in black, but assures Jade that Glen would not be so foolish, unless it had something to do with Lynn. Alina is accosted by a lecherous guild official, who appears to be attracted to her, until a jealous Jade gets rid of him. Alina demands Jade return to normal since she misses having reasons to be mad at him, making Jade believe she is warming up to him. Laila interrupts with rumors of a Reaper haunting the training hall. News arrives of another new dungeon, the Civi Cathedral. Despite still training with Rosetta, Alina and Laila are both swamped with paperwork they are expected to complete at night. Jade informs Lowe and Lululee that the man in black and the Reaper might be the same person. That night, the Reaper breaks into the Guild Research Centre and steals Silha's Dark God Core. At the same time, Alina and Laila are accosted in their room by the lecherous official possessed by a spirit, though Alina simply exorcizes it by punching him unconscious. They fetch Jade and his party, who is certain it is just a weak Ghost. On their way back, they spot and chase the Reaper into the Training Hall, leaving Laila behind in the process, where he activates a trap built into the hall itself, dropping Alina and Silver Sword into an abyss.
11	"It May Be a Trap, But I Have to Keep Moving Forward"; Transliteration: "Wana ka mo Shire nai desu ga, Mae e Susumu shika nai to Omoi masu" (Japanese: 罠かもしれないですが、前へ進むしかないと思います)	Katsuhiko Bizen	Misaki Morie	Katsuhiko Bizen	March 22, 2025
The Reaper admits he is Glen (proving Jade's suspicions correct, though Alina and Lululee find this hard to believe) and they are in a secret floor of the Guild's private labyrinth. A flashback shows that in his youth, Glen was renowned for being arrogant, selfish, and cruel, so the Guildmaster asked him to raise an orphan named Lynn so he would learn how to love. Glen leads them to the labyrinth's boss room where his teammates were all killed, including Lynn. Glen claims he can resurrect them by reversing time inside the room, but to do so, he needed a resurrected Dark God's core. For years, he thought it was impossible to defeat a Dark God, until he met Alina and immediately began manipulating her and Silver Sword so they would kill a Dark God for him, also using Rufus and Heitz as pawns for his scheme. Glen reveals that he has implanted Silha's core into his left hand, sacrificing his soul to become a dark God himself. Alina insists that resurrecting the dead is impossible, but Glen insists he has to tell Lynn he loves her, something he was always too proud to say when she was alive. Aware that becoming a Dark God might corrupt him, he asks Alina to kill him if that happens. Glen activates the core and Alina sees a vision of a younger Glen with Lynn's body and an unseen man who told Glen how he could resurrect her. Glen continues to mutate, furious that even with the core, he cannot rewind time even a few minutes more to when Lynn was alive. Desperate, he allows the core to consume him completely, planning to devour Alina and Silver Sword to increase his power.
12	"I May Be a Guild Receptionist, But I’ll Fight to the Bitter End to Get Out of Working Overtime"; Transliteration: "Girudo no Uketsukejō desu ga, Zangyō Kaihi no tame ni Saigo made Tatakaō to Omoi masu" (Japanese: ギルドの受付嬢ですが、残業回避のため最後まで戦おうと思います)	Takeshi Nagasawa	Misuzu Chiba	Hatsuki Tsuji	March 29, 2025
Jade plans to destroy the core and hopefully return Glen's humanity. By activating his skills twice and with Lululee's healing magic preventing brain damage, Jade manages to see a fraction of a second into the future and just barely dodge Glen's attacks. Alina activates her golden flames, becomes immune to Glen pausing time and disarms him. Glen offers to resurrect Shroud, but Alina refuses to sacrifice her new friends for her old friend. Glen realizes he was so obsessed with bringing Lynn back, he almost gave up his precious memories of her. Alina severs his arm, separating him from the core. Several days later, Glen awakens and is furious to be alive, having hoped his death would atone for betraying the guild. Alina furiously reminds him he is not allowed to die until he hires more receptionists so she does not have to work overtime. Jade demands to know about the man who told Glen how to resurrect Lynn, but a curse activates that forces Glen to forget the man or what he looked like; the group deduct that the man also has a Dia skill. Alina's plan to reduce overtime loses the competition, so she does not win the day off on her birthday. Jade gifts her another relic, but reveals this one is broken and cannot warn her if Jade is close to death. Instead, he hopes it will remind her of his promise to never die. Alina accepts the necklace and returns to work, only to find her stack of paperwork has somehow grown. Furious, she dons her Executioner outfit and rushes to the Civi Cathedral alongside Silver Sword to defeat the boss, whom she blames for her still having to work overtime.

=== Other ===
The series has had illustration collaborations with Sword Art Online Alternative Gun Gale Online and Hololive-affiliated VTuber Minato Aqua, who was also illustrated by the light novel illustrator Gaou.

== Reception ==
In 2021, the series won the gold prize at the 27th Dengeki Novel Prize.

== See also ==
- Welcome to the Outcast's Restaurant!, another light novel series with the same illustrator
