= Kaiten Books =

American publishing company

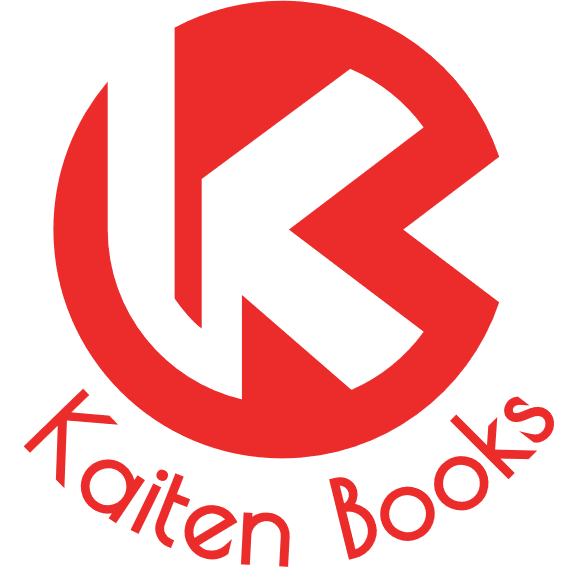
- Status: Active
- Founded: 2019; 6 years ago
- Founder: Garrison Denim
- Country of origin: United States
- Headquarters location: Torrance, California
- Distribution: International
- Publication types: Manga
- Official website: www.kaitenbooks.com

Kaiten Books LLC is an independent American language localization and publishing company located in Southern California. The company focuses on the translation of Japanese Manga into English and publishes a wide variety of genres. It has licensed titles from Japanese publishers such as Overlap, Micro Magazine, and Futabasha.

== History ==
Kaiten Books was founded in 2019 and became active in March 2020. The company's first announced partnership was with the Japanese publisher Overlap which included the debut manga licenses Loner Life in Another World and Shed that Skin, Ryugasaki-san!

In June 2020, Kaiten Books founders made an appearance on the Manga Monthly podcast, hosted by New York Public Librarian Joe Pascullo, and discussed their latest license acquisitions and motivations behind starting the company.

Shortly after, Kaiten Books announced a partnership with Futabasha in July 2020 with the licensing of the manga My Dad's the Queen of All VTubers?! and Uchi no Maid ga Uzasugiru!, as well as a partnership with Micro Magazine after announcing it had acquired the licenses for The Yakuza's Guide to Babysitting and Gacha Girls Corps in December 2020.

In March 2021, Kaiten Books formally announced it would be expanding its physical distribution capabilities through a partnership with Pathway Book Service to make its releases more widely available in traditional brick-and-mortar storefronts and internationally.

Later in December 2021 Kaiten Books announced a partnership with the digital manga subscription service Azuki as the exclusive streaming home for select titles.

Kaiten Books announced in its May 2022 press release that it would be attending Anime Expo 2022, marking the company's first convention appearance.

== Publications ==
=== Manga titles ===
- The Bottom-Tier Baron's Accidental Rise to the Top
- Gacha Girls Corps
- Loner Life in Another World
- My Dad's the Queen of All VTubers?!
- Shed that Skin, Ryugasaki-san!
- UzaMaid – Our Maid is Way Too Annoying!
- The Yakuza's Guide to Babysitting
- Welcome to the Outcast's Restaurant!
