= Welcome to the Outcast's Restaurant! =

Japanese light novel series

- First light novel volume cover (original edition)

追放者食堂へようこそ！ (Tsuihōsha Shokudō e Yōkoso!)
- Genre: Cooking; Fantasy
- Novel series
- Written by: Yūki Kimikawa
- Published by: Shōsetsuka ni Narō
- Original run: October 22, 2018 – September 5, 2020
- Light novel
- Written by: Yūki Kimikawa
- Illustrated by: Gaou (original edition); Tsumumi (new edition)
- Published by: Overlap
- English publisher: NA: Tentai Books (defunct)
- Imprint: Overlap Novels
- Original run: June 25, 2019 – present
- Volumes: 3
- Manga
- Written by: Yūki Kimikawa
- Illustrated by: Tsumumi
- Published by: Overlap
- English publisher: NA: Kaiten Books
- Imprint: Gardo Comics
- Magazine: Comic Gardo
- Original run: September 27, 2019 – present
- Volumes: 11
- Anime television series
- Directed by: Jōji Shimura
- Written by: Deko Akao
- Music by: Masato Kōda
- Studio: OLM Team Yoshioka
- Licensed by: Crunchyroll; SEA: Tropics Entertainment
- Original network: AT-X, Tokyo MX, CBC, BS11
- Original run: July 3, 2025 – September 18, 2025
- Episodes: 12

Welcome to the Outcast's Restaurant! (Japanese: 追放者食堂へようこそ！, Hepburn: Tsuihōsha Shokudō e Yōkoso!) is a Japanese light novel series written by Yūki Kimikawa and illustrated by Gaou. It was serialized online between October 2018 to September 2020 on the user-generated novel publishing website Shōsetsuka ni Narō. It was later acquired by Overlap, who have published three volumes since June 2019 under their Overlap Novels imprint. A manga adaptation with art by Tsumumi has been serialized online via Overlap's Comic Gardo website since September 2019 and has been collected in eleven tankōbon volumes. An anime television series adaptation produced by OLM aried from July to September 2025.

== Characters ==
Dennis (デニス, Denisu)
Voiced by: Shunsuke Takeuchi
A level 99 chef who was exiled from the Silver Wing Battalion. Specializing in alchemy, metallurgy, knives, and more due to his focus on cooking, he provided support for most of Silver Wing's members in and out of battle. Opens a restaurant in a small town after his exile, called the Adventurer's Restaurant, where he serves his various regulars.
Atelier (アトリエ, Atorie)
Voiced by: Marika Tachibana
A young girl who was sold into slavery after being cast out of the noble Workstatt family. She is bought by Dennis, who sets her free shortly afterwards. She uses her newfound freedom to help out at the Adventurer's Restaurant, becoming known as its poster girl.
Henrietta (ヘンリエッタ)
Voiced by: Sayumi Suzushiro
A swordswoman who used to hide her gender by wearing full-plate armor due to her insecurity, and Dennis's first customer. One of Dennis's regulars, she is frequently allowed to eat for free due to not being able to find work easily. Her impoverished background where her family used to eat leather made her not picky with regards to her choices of food.
Vivia (ビビア, Bibia)
Voiced by: Mariya Ise
A rookie mage and one of Dennis' regular who is initially self-centered and thought highly of himself, causing him to frequently argue with his party and kicked out of it as a result. After joining Night Fog and suffers a near-death experience during the initiation test, he humbled down and strived to be the best magician in the world.
Bachel (バチェル, Bacheru)
Voiced by: Satsumi Matsuda
One of Dennis regular. A country girl who is a prodigy in magic. She joined Night Fog, who overworks and abuses her, and made her sign a contract that would not allow her to leave without legal repercussions. Severely depressed, she attempted suicide but was saved by Henrietta and Vivia. Dennis then helped her negotiate with the Night Fog leader, which led to her contract being voided, allowing her to leave the party.
Vigo (ヴィゴー, Vigō)
Voiced by: Ryōta Suzuki
A level 99 swordsman who is known as the "Azure Rendsword" due to his destructive power and full-body blue armor. The leader of Silver Wing and its most fearsome fighter. He is a ruthless, psychopathic, and power-hungry man driven by ambition who exiled Dennis to begin his plan to usurp power, and to have Katie to himself. Frequently acts on his own and views others as a stepping stone, using his power to deter dissenting voices in Silver Wing.
Katie (ケイティ, Keiti)
Voiced by: Chika Anzai
A level 84 swordswoman who is known as the "Crimson Swiftsword" due to her agile fighting style and red armor. The vice-captain of Silver Wing, she wears very revealing bikini armor due to her immense pride in her body, which has the added effect of seducing nobles. Was the one who recruited Dennis, and remained his sole friend while he was in the Battalion. Their closeness made others think they were dating when they were not. Continues to support Dennis after his exile.

== Media ==
=== Light novels ===
Written by Yūki Kimikawa, Welcome to the Outcast's Restaurant! was serialized on the user-generated novel publishing website Shōsetsuka ni Narō from October 22, 2018, to September 5, 2020. It was later acquired by Overlap who began releasing it with illustrations by Gaou under their Overlap Novels light novel imprint on June 25, 2019. Three volumes have been released as of June 25, 2020. The series was licensed in English by Tentai Books, which released two volumes before the publisher shut down in 2024. In July 2025, it was announced illustrator Gaou had been replaced due to him admitting to having a sexual relationship with a minor. A new edition of all three volumes, with illustrations by Tsumumi, was released by Overlap on July 20, 2026.

==== First edition ====
No.	Original release date	Original ISBN	North American release date	North American ISBN
1	June 25, 2019	978-4-86554-513-5	August 7, 2020	978-84-122008-3-6
2	November 25, 2019	978-4-86554-574-6	January 5, 2023	978-84-123546-8-3
3	June 25, 2020	978-4-86554-682-8	—	—

==== New edition ====
No.	Japanese release date	Japanese ISBN
1	July 20, 2026	978-4-8240-1734-5
2	July 20, 2026	978-4-8240-1735-2
3	July 20, 2026	978-4-8240-1736-9

=== Manga ===
A manga adaptation illustrated by Tsumumi, with some character designs by Bad Girl creator Nikumaru, began serialization on Overlap's Comic Gardo manga service on September 27, 2019. The manga's chapters have been compiled into eleven tankōbon volumes as of August 2026. The manga adaptation is licensed in English by Kaiten Books.

No.	Original release date	Original ISBN	North American release date	North American ISBN
1	May 25, 2020	978-4-86554-668-2	March 12, 2021 (digital); January 4, 2022 (print)	978-1-952241-18-5 (digital); 978-1-952241-19-2 (print)
2	September 25, 2020	978-4-86554-750-4	June 10, 2022 (digital); July 7, 2023 (print)	978-1-952241-36-9 (digital); 978-1-952241-37-6 (print)
3	March 25, 2021	978-4-86554-875-4	September 1, 2023 (digital); September 20, 2024 (print)	978-1-952241-60-4 (digital); 978-1-952241-61-1 (print)
4	September 25, 2021	978-4-8240-0008-8	April 25, 2025 (digital); TBA (print)	978-1-952241-78-9 (digital); 978-1-952241-79-6 (print)
5	April 25, 2022	978-4-8240-0173-3	July 11, 2025 (digital); TBA (print)	978-1-952241-82-6 (digital); 978-1-952241-83-3 (print)
6	December 25, 2022	978-4-8240-0371-3	—	—
7	September 25, 2023	978-4-8240-0617-2	—	—
8	June 25, 2024	978-4-8240-0868-8	—	—
9	March 25, 2025	978-4-8240-1098-8	—	—
10	July 25, 2025	978-4-8240-1275-3	—	—
11	August 20, 2026	978-4-8240-1812-0	—	—

=== Anime ===
An anime television series adaptation was announced at the Overlap Bunko 10th anniversary event on December 15, 2024. It is produced by OLM and directed by Jōji Shimura, with series composition handled by Deko Akao, characters designed by Aoi Yamato, and music composed by Masato Kōda. The series aired from July 3 to September 18, 2025, on AT-X and other networks. The opening theme song is "Unique" (ユニーク, Yunīku), performed by Dannie May, while the ending theme song is "Magokoro My Heart" (まごころMy Heart; Sincerely My Heart), performed by Chō Tokimeki Sendenbu. Crunchyroll is streaming the series. Tropics Entertainment licensed the series in Southeast Asia for streaming on the Tropics Anime Asia YouTube channel.

==== Episodes ====
No.	Title	Directed by (Note: Production staff information is taken from the ending credits of each episode.)	Written by	Storyboarded by	Original release date
1	"You Are Free"; Transliteration: "Omae wa Jiyūda" (Japanese: お前は自由だ)	Nozomi Ishii	Deko Akao	Jōji Shimura; Nozomi Ishii	July 3, 2025
The adventuring party Silver Wing fail to defeat a cave dragon. Captain Vigo blames their cook Dennis for his skill Dread Voice scaring the dragon away, even though it was Vigo who told him to use it. Despite their both being level 99 Vigo looks down on Dennis for being a cook and pressures the other party members to kick Dennis out. Dennis willingly leaves, actually grateful they are no longer his problem. Vice-captain Katie chases after Dennis, begging him not to leave since she knows Dennis has been vital to their victories in his supporting roles as cook, alchemist and healer, and without him Silver Wing are actually pretty useless. Dennis chooses to leave anyway, planning to open a restaurant. After obtaining a run-down shop Dennis comes across a slave-trader with a little girl supposedly the only survivor of a ruined noble family. Dennis is compelled to buy her to save her from the merchant Polvo, a known pervert. Traumatised from her past, the girl Atelier is surprised Dennis grants her freedom, but she decides to stay after trying his food. After a few weeks preparing Dennis opens The Adventurer's Restaurant, with Atelier as his waitress. Their first customer keeps their identity hidden behind a suit of armour.
2	"It's Crazy Delicious!"; Transliteration: "Meccha Oishī desu!" (Japanese: めっちゃおいしいです！)	Mayu Numayama	Deko Akao	Mayu Numayama	July 10, 2025
The customer chooses the cheapest meal due to lack of money, so Dennis decides to just make a more expensive dish for free. The customer accidentally reveals she is a female adventurer named Henrietta. She explains despite her skills she was kicked from her all-male party just for being a woman and hopes to find work hiding her gender under male armour. Dennis asks around and finds a party of male adventurers willing to hire her. Later, Dennis hears a rumour an all-male party has been hiring female adventurers in order to take them into dungeons, rape them and leave them to be killed by monsters. Henrietta is thrilled her new party values her skills with a sword but after a full day of monster-slaying she is so tired she is easily paralysed by the party mage, revealing their contempt for female warriors. Dennis furiously appears with twin meat cleavers with a paper bag hiding his face, thus knocking out the rapists. Henrietta awakens at the adventurer's guild with no idea how she got there but grateful the rapists have been found and arrested. She returns to Dennis' restaurant and learns he had mysteriously closed the restaurant for the last two days. Looking closely of Dennis, she realises he somewhat resembles the paper bag man. Before she can ask about it she is interrupted by another customer's arrival.
3	"It's an Adventurer!"; Transliteration: "Sore ga Bōkensha da!" (Japanese: それが冒険者だ！)	Norio Nitta	Takashi Ifukube	Norio Nitta; Akiko Nagashima	July 17, 2025
Henrietta decides to get rid of her male armour when Dennis tells her to be herself as an adventurer, while reminding her she needs to start paying for her meals. Adventurer Vivia Strange comes in complaining local adventurers are too inferior to form a party with. Dennis realizes his last party probably kicked him out. Vivia eventually joins the Night Mist party for a job on the labyrinth's fifth floor. Dennis worries as Vivia is too weak for the fifth floor. He confronts two members of Night Mist who admit they left Vivia alone on the fifth floor as a cruel test to see if he can survive. In the labyrinth, Vivia runs from goblins and his panic makes him forget all his spells. He is rescued by a young adventurer named Cynthia, whose party also abandoned her. Vivia realizes he has been an arrogant idiot and decides to help Cynthia escape. He draws the goblins to himself but is saved by Dennis, who scolds his idiocy. Accompanied by Dennis, Vivia tries to retrieve Cynthia but devastatingly finds only her skeleton in the hole where he was hiding. At the adventurers guild, Vivia learns Cynthia went missing 13 years ago when her party abandoned her in the labyrinth. Dennis explains lost adventurer's spirits sometimes appear to help others who become lost in labyrinths. With help from Dennis, Vivia makes a grave for Cynthia and buried her properly. Heartbroken and ashamed, Vivia promises to visit Cynthia's grave whenever he's free, to become a great wizard and rescue others who get lost in labyrinths.
4	"Then, I'll Have the Daily Special"; Transliteration: "Jā, Higawari Teishoku de" (Japanese: じゃあ、日替わり定食で)	Nozomi Ishii	Masanao Akahoshi	Tomoko Akiyama	July 24, 2025
Night Mist member Bachel is overworked by her lazy party members. Hungry, she visits Dennis' restaurant where the friendly atmosphere remind her how miserable her life has become. Atelier hopes Dennis can help, but Dennis insist if Bachel wants to be happy it is better she do it herself. On a quest Bachel rescues a senior but is blamed for embarrassing him. Depressed, Bachel jumps from the clock-tower to kill herself but is saved by Henrietta and Vivia. Dennis meets Night Mist's leader Hopper and learns Bachel was tricked into signing an employment contract allowing Hopper to work her like a slave. Atelier admits to Bachel she once considered suicide to escape slavery, until she met Dennis. She also admits it is Bachel's choice to die, but she hopes she chooses to live. Dennis and Hopper are interrupted by Katie, whom Hopper recognises as the Silver Wing's vice-captain. When Katie blurts out Dennis is a former Silver Wing member (and almost her boyfriend) Hopper quickly burns Bachel's contract and flees with his men, hoping to never see Dennis again. Henrietta and Vivia are astounded Dennis is on casual terms with someone as famous as Katie. Bachel starts to recover and enjoys another of Dennis' meals.
5	"It's Too Soon for a Marriage Proposal!"; Transliteration: "Puropōzu Nante Hayasugiruda ro!" (Japanese: プロポーズなんて早すぎるだろ！)	Lee Ki-sup	Takashi Ifukube	Norio Nitta; Akiko Nagashima	July 31, 2025
Katie reveals Silver Wings have begun failing quests since Dennis' departure. Dennis refuses to return and Vigo also refuses to invite Dennis back. The restaurant becomes more popular so Dennis hires Bachel as second waitress. Henrietta's food bill continues to increase, worrying her Dennis might stop feeding her until she can pay. Dennis shares with Vivia his fear Atelier has a secret boyfriend as he recently saw her talking with a boy. Atelier leaves to go shopping so Dennis drags Vivia with him to follow her. He sees Atelier meet the same boy then go to a jewellers. Dennis panics they might be buying wedding rings. Henrietta is upset that despite working constantly she never has money spare to pay Dennis. She and Bachel learn Night Mist might be planning revenge on Dennis. Dennis is forced to stop following Atelier to chase a purse thief. He is eventually caught by Henrietta who is relieved Dennis isn't planning to ban her from the restaurant. Atelier reveals the boy works at the jewellers and helped her buy a bracelet for Dennis the same colour as his eyes to thank him for everything. Dennis feels considerable relief there is no boyfriend. Meanwhile, Vigo is summoned by an important man.
6	"I've Come for Lady Atelier"; Transliteration: "Aatorie-ojōsama Omukae ni Agarimashita" (Japanese: アトリエお嬢様お迎えに上がりました)	Mayu Numayama	Masanao Akahoshi	Kanako Watanabe	August 7, 2025
Atelier's family butler Stevens tracks her down, revealing she is daughter of the Workstatt family, the greatest wizards in the kingdom. Atelier's uncle Joseph stole her inheritance when her father Lord Famas died, so the Royal Court of Justice wishes to investigate whether she or Joseph is the rightful heir. At the Workstatt mansion they meet Atelier's lawyer Sestavitch who retrieves Atelier's blood and uses a device to prove Atelier is daughter of Famas and his wife Eliza. Vivia is surprised to learn Dennis' surname is Blacks. Unfortunately, at the tribunal a second blood test proves Atelier is daughter of Famas' unidentified mistress. As such Joseph is awarded the family wealth while Atelier only receives Famas' book collection. Dennis is able to expose Stevens contaminated Eliza's blood so Atelier would appear not to be Eliza's daughter. Stevens admits Joseph bribed him and the magistrate to further discredit Atelier. Dennis is furious but legally cannot do anything. Instead they visit Famas library where Sestavitch discovers thousands of national treasure level books, collectively worth hundreds of times what Joseph inherited. Dennis is amused Famas probably meant for Atelier to inherit the library the entire time, leaving Joseph with almost nothing in comparison. Atelier decides to move the library to the restaurant where anyone can read them. Vivia encounters Heath, an intense man with a similar face to Dennis.
7	"Get Better Soon"; Transliteration: "Hayaku, Yoku Natte ne" (Japanese: 早く、良くなってね)	Norio Nitta	Deko Akao	Norio Nitta; Akiko Nagashima	August 14, 2025
Due to the rare books on magic the restaurant is swarmed by wizards desperate to read them, pushing Dennis to his limit trying to feed them all. Atelier allows a visitor to borrow one of the books, hoping the spells can cure his wife's illness. Dennis overworks and faints, dreaming of his childhood when he was homeless. He returned a purse a woman named Jean dropped in the street and in gratitude she took him in at Black's Restaurant where she was head chef. Atelier blames herself for causing Dennis so much extra work. Sestavitch visits to read one of Atelier's books but catches Henrietta almost destroying the kitchen trying to make food for Dennis. Dennis dreams of making fried rice that disgusted a customer due to his improper use of magic. Rather than yell at him Jean decided to teach him how to use magic in the kitchen. Sestavitch walks them through cooking rice using magic, though his technical descriptions confuse Henrietta. Polvo visits, offering to sell them a magic rice cooker that does the job automatically. Atelier assists and uses the rice for egg Okayu. Dennis enjoys the meal but is surprised Atelier let Polvo help with the rice.
8	"Today, We Are Closed for Business Reasons"; Transliteration: "Honjitsu, Shoyō Nitsuki Rinji Kyūgyō" (Japanese: 本日、所用につき臨時休業)	Lee Ki-sup	Masanao Akahoshi	Hideki Ohba	August 21, 2025
Dennis takes everyone to a hot springs inn to celebrate Henrietta getting a steady job with the knights and Vivia finding a new adventuring party. Bachel also announces she is leaving to the royal capitol where she has been hired as a magic instructor. Polvo interrupts their party, first to flirt with Atelier, for which he is punished, then to offer thanks for being such good customers by providing A5 Haagen meat for a feast. Vivia asks Dennis if he is affiliated with the Blacks Restaurant. Dennis admits the chef who raised him let him use her family name, but the last time he saw her they argued about his desire to reach level 100, so he left and now feels uncomfortable using her name. They return to the restaurant to find it on fire; regular customers having apprehended two members of Night Mist who admit it was revenge arranged by Atelier's uncle Joseph, Captain Vigo and Hopper. Knowing they can't realistically defend themselves against such powerful enemies Dennis decides to leave with Atelier and open a restaurant somewhere far away, though promises to bring her back to visit everyone once it is safer. While they are packing more men approach the restaurant outside.
9	"If It's Important to You, Then Please Don't Let Go of It!"; Transliteration: "Daijina Mononara, Tebana Sanaide Kudasai!" (Japanese: 大事なものなら、手放さないでください！)	Nozomi Ishii	Takashi Ifukube	Norio Nitta; Akiko Nagashima	August 28, 2025
The men, and women and children, turn out to be Dennis' regular customers and many others he has met since opening the restaurant, all there to support him. Dennis realises he can't disappoint them and decides to stay, renaming his restaurant The Outcast's Restaurant. Katie arrives with news Vigo orchestrated the arson, but as Silver Wing's vice-captain she can't do anything except to reveal an interesting fact. Dennis decides to visit his foster mother, Jeane Blacks, revealing to everyone that Jeane is secretly one of the few living humans to have reached level 100 and earn the title Rank Sovereign. Everyone else begins contacting the greatest wizards and sages in the country. Henrietta visits Sestavitch for legal advice. Polvo puts his merchant skills to use. Atelier encounters the man to whom she leant one of her books to cure his wife's illness. The man returns the book, now the only remaining book of Atelier's collection after the fire, and offers his services as a powerful wind magic user. Dennis admits to Jeane he is no longer obsessed with reaching level 100. He then asks for her help as Katie had told him Vigo, Joseph, Hopper, a judge of the Royal Court of Law and many other influential people are scheduled to attend a dinner. As the kingdom's most influential chef, Dennis asks Jeane to find out where and when this dinner is taking place.
10	"The Higher and Further Away a Place Is, the More I Aim to Reach It"; Transliteration: "Yori Tōku, Harukani Takai Tokorokoso, Ore no Mezasu Basho da" (Japanese: より遠く、遥かに高いところこそ、俺の目指す場所だ)	Mayu Numayama	Masanao Akahoshi	Hiroaki Yoshikawa	September 4, 2025
Jeane provides the location of the dinner and a secret hint about reaching level 100, which Dennis fails to understand. Vigo recalls as children his father died and his mother remarried, leaving Vigo and his sick brother alone. Vigo gained sympathy from local nobles but his feelings of inferiority caused him to set fire to their mansion. He then fled, leaving his brother behind and determined to surpass everyone in the entire world. First he joined the Silver Fang and secretly murdered Captain Gadeus to replace him. Afterwards he changed the party name to Silver Wings and began hiring powerful adventurers like Katie with the aim of controlling the kingdom. Now, Vigo attends the secret dinner with Joseph, Hopper and the Senior Judge of the Royal Court to discuss ruling the kingdom in secret using their influence over the law, military and politicians. Vigo plans to eventually murder all three of them so he can be the hero who exposed their crimes and saved the kingdom. From there he can be promoted to nobility, usurp the king and build an empire. Dennis appears and terrifies Joseph, Hopper and the judge with his Dread Voice so they admit to their crimes before Vigo can stop them. Atelier's wind magic mage projects their confession to a temporary restaurant Dennis set up in the courtyard below, filled with the kingdoms nobility and its most senior wizards and sages.
11	"The Last Piece?"; Transliteration: "Saigo no Pīsu?" (Japanese: 最後のピース?)	Norio Nitta	Deko Akao	Jōji Shimura; Norio Nitta	September 11, 2025
The nobles and mages are outraged, especially at the burning of Atelier's books, which can never be replaced. Sestavitch and dozens of other lawyers in the crowd prepare to immediately bring charges of treason. Vigo decides to kill Dennis then take over the kingdom by force and form a military dictatorship. Dennis proves Vigo's equal using his Chef Magic. They both recall the day Dennis joined Silver Wing and Vigo looked down on him for only wanting to achieve being a level 100 chef, whereas Vigo wanted the whole world to acknowledge him. Vigo's hatred of the nobility continued to grow, as did his frustration that Dennis didn't hate them as well, despite all the reasons he should do. Vigo pushes Dennis back and accuses him of taking the noble's side just because he was adopted by Jeanne and raised in a rich family. Dennis recalls Jeanne telling him he is too half-hearted to reach level 100. Dennis suddenly realises he became a chef because of the happiness he felt the first time Jeanne made him fried rice, a feeling he has tried to share with others through his own food. He also recalls what Jeanne recently told him; level 100 isn't something you become, it's something you already are without knowing it. Finally understanding what she meant Dennis unlocks the level 100 potential he always had in his heart and declares himself the Strongest Chef.
12	"Welcome to the Outcast's Restaurant!"; Transliteration: "Tsuihōsha Shokudō e Yōkoso!" (Japanese: 追放者食堂へようこそ！)	Nozomi Ishii	Deko Akao	Jōji Shimura; Tomoko Akiyama	September 18, 2025
Dennis declares Vigo is permanently banned from his restaurant and unleashes his Level 100 unique skill "Forced Shop Exit Strike", burying Vigo deep into the earth. Vigo and his accomplices are arrested while Katie is made Captain of the Silver Wing. She asks Jeanne how Dennis achieved level 100 and Jeanne believes it comes from discovering the reason why you exist in the first place. For Dennis, it was protecting his customers from anyone who threatened them, though she also admits "Forced Shop Exit Strike" is a silly skill for a chef. Elsewhere, a man named Heath learns of Vigo's defeat but is unconcerned as it doesn't majorly affect his plans. He is also proud of his brother, Dennis, for his victory. The royal government begins arresting everybody that ever helped Vigo with his illegal activities. Even with Joseph arrested Atelier refuses to become head of the Workstatt family. The kingdom's mages begin a massive research project to invent a spell that can restore Atelier's fire damaged books. Everyone cooperates to rebuild the Outcast's Restaurant. Henrietta joins the knights and Bachel begins teaching at a magic academy. Vivia promises Cynthia he will return once he is a great wizard. Dennis reopens the restaurant and resumes cooking for all his friends.

== Reception ==
By December 2024, the series had over 850,000 copies in circulation.

== See also ==
- I May Be a Guild Receptionist, But I'll Solo Any Boss to Clock Out on Time, another light novel series with the same illustrator
