= The Yakuza's Guide to Babysitting =

Japanese manga and anime series

- First tankōbon volume cover, featuring Tōru Kirishima (left) and Yaeka Sakuragi (right)

組長娘と世話係 (Kumichō Musume to Sewagakari)
- Genre: Comedy; Slice of life; Yakuza
- Manga
- Written by: Tsukiya
- Published by: Micro Magazine
- English publisher: NA: Kaiten Books
- Magazine: Comic Ride pixiv; Comic Elmo
- Original run: June 5, 2018 – present
- Volumes: 16
- Anime television series
- Directed by: Itsuro Kawasaki
- Written by: Keiichirō Ōchi
- Music by: Takurō Iga
- Studio: Feel; Gaina
- Licensed by: Crunchyroll
- Original network: Tokyo MX, RKB, BS NTV, TSS
- Original run: July 7, 2022 – September 22, 2022
- Episodes: 12
- icon

The Yakuza's Guide to Babysitting (Japanese: 組長娘と世話係, Hepburn: Kumichō Musume to Sewagakari; transl. "The Yakuza Boss's Daughter and her Caretaker") is a Japanese web manga series written and illustrated by Tsukiya. It began serialization in the Comic Ride pixiv website in June 2018, and later transferred to Micro Magazine's Comic Elmo manga service in May 2020. It has been collected in 16 tankōbon volumes as of July 2026. An anime television series adaptation produced by Feel and Gaina aired from July to September 2022.

== Plot ==
Tōru Kirishima, the violent and feared lieutenant of the Sakuragi crime family, is known in the underworld as the "Demon of Sakuragi." After his recklessness nearly disrupts a peace agreement, family boss Kazuhiko Sakuragi assigns him a new responsibility, caring for his seven-year-old daughter, Yaeka. Initially unable to understand one another, Kirishima and Yaeka gradually form a close bond as he learns patience, restraint, and responsibility while protecting her and helping her navigate everyday life.

== Characters ==
Tōru Kirishima (霧島 透, Kirishima Tōru)
Voiced by: Yoshimasa Hosoya (drama CD, anime) (Japanese); Jonah Scott (English)
An enforcer in the Sakuragi family branch of yakuza, Kirishima is tasked by his boss to watch over his 7-year-old daughter Yaeka. Kirishima has known Yaeka since she was a baby. Unbeknownst to Yaeka, Kirishima was once known as Sakuragi's Demon, a notoriously cold-blooded contract killer.
Yaeka Sakuragi (桜樹 八重花, Sakuragi Yaeka)
Voiced by: Misaki Watada (drama CD, anime) (Japanese); Emi Lo (English)
A quiet, shy, kind and gentle 7-year-old, she is the daughter of Kazuhiko Sakuragi. Her father conscripted Kirishima to be her babysitter as his wife is currently hospitalized, when his mother was left in a coma after the car accident. While initially cold and unresponsive, particularly to Kirishima, she begins to warm to him and other members of her family as the series progresses. She has a very honest personality.
Kei Sugihara (杉原 恵, Sugihara Kei)
Voiced by: Kaito Ishikawa (drama CD, anime) (Japanese); Nazeeh Tarsha (English)
The subordinate of Kirishima. Originally a shoplifter who later become a member of the gang after he returns the stolen cup with lotus design from the yakuza-protected antique store and apologized to the shop owner, who is a very old lady.
Kazuhiko Sakuragi (桜樹 一彦, Sakuragi Kazuhiko)
Voiced by: Ryōta Takeuchi (drama CD, anime) (Japanese); Christopher Sabat (English)
The boss of the gang and Yaeka's father.
Kanami Kurosaki (黒崎 香菜美, Kurosaki Kanami)
Voiced by: Misa Kobayashi (drama CD, anime) (Japanese); Cherami Leigh (English)

A sister of Miyuki, sister-in-law of Kazuhiko and aunt of Yaeka. She is the owner of the restaurant

Miyuki Sakuragi (桜樹 美幸, Sakuragi Miyuki)
Voiced by: Mai Nakahara (anime)

Yaeka's mother and wife of the gang leader, Kazuhiko. She is currently hospitalized due to car crash for over 4 years.

Tōichirō Aoi (葵 塔一郎, Aoi Tōichirō)
Voiced by: Tomoaki Maeno (anime) (Japanese); Aleks Le (English)
Rei Hojo (北条 零, Hōjō Rei)
Voiced by: Wataru Hatano (anime)

The former high school friend of Toru Kirishima.

Masaya Hayami (速水 雅也, Hayami Masaya)
Voiced by: Jun Fukuyama (anime)
Yuri Mashiro (真白 悠莉, Mashiro Yūri)
Voiced by: Hiroshi Kamiya (anime) (Japanese); Y. Chang (English)
A former acquaintance of Kirishima who desires to return him to his persona as "Sakuragi's Demon." Mashiro is a sociopath, often displaying signs of mental instability, especially when inflicting pain or watching others suffer.

== Media ==
=== Manga ===
The Yakuza's Guide to Babysitting is written and illustrated by Tsukiya. The series began serialization in the Comic Ride pixiv website on June 5, 2018. In May 2020, it transferred to Micro Magazine's Comic Elmo manga service. The first tankōbon volume was released on December 24, 2018. As of July 10, 2026, 16 volumes have been released.

In December 2020, Kaiten Books announced that it had licensed the series for English publication. The first volume was released digitally on February 12, 2021, and in print format on July 20. The series was added to Azuki in June 2021 as a launch title.

==== Volumes ====
No.	Original release date	Original ISBN	English release date	English ISBN
1	December 24, 2018	978-4-89-637849-8	February 12, 2021 (digital); July 20, 2021 (print)	978-1-952241-17-8
2	July 19, 2019	978-4-89-637900-6	July 23, 2021 (digital); March 22, 2022 (print)	978-1-952241-25-3
3	January 24, 2020	978-4-89-637967-9; 978-4-89-637968-6 (SE)	January 28, 2022 (digital); August 16, 2022 (print)	978-1-952241-33-8
4	July 22, 2020	978-4-86-716032-9	June 24, 2022 (digital); December 2, 2022 (print)	978-1-952241-39-0
5	December 10, 2020	978-4-86-716090-9	August 26, 2022 (digital); December 8, 2023 (print)	978-1-952241-43-7
6	September 10, 2021	978-4-86-716165-4; 978-4-86-716166-1 (SE)	March 24, 2023 (digital); TBA (print)	978-1-952241-51-2
7	February 10, 2022	978-4-86-716245-3	February 2, 2024 (digital); TBA (print)	—
8	July 11, 2022	978-4-86-716301-6; 978-4-86-716302-3 (SE)	—	—
9	January 11, 2023	978-4-86-716379-5	—	—
10	July 10, 2023	978-4-86-716443-3; 978-4-86-716444-0 (SE)	—	—
11	December 11, 2023	978-4-86-716503-4; 978-4-86-716504-1 (SE)	—	—
12	July 10, 2024	978-4-86-716602-4; 978-4-86-716603-1 (SE)	—	—
13	December 11, 2024	978-4-86-716676-5; 978-4-86-716677-2 (SE)	—	—
14	July 10, 2025	978-4-86-716789-2; 978-4-86-716790-8 (SE)	—	—
15	December 10, 2025	978-4-86-716878-3; 978-4-86-716879-0 (SE)	—	—
16	July 10, 2026	978-4-86-716996-4; 978-4-86-716997-1 (SE)	—	—

=== Anime ===
An anime television series adaptation was announced on September 8, 2021. It is produced by Feel and Gaina and directed by Itsuro Kawasaki, with scripts written by Keiichirō Ōchi, character designs by Hiromi Ogata, and music composed by Takurō Iga. The series aired from July 7 to September 22, 2022, on Tokyo MX and other channels. The opening theme song is "Mirai no Hero Tachi e" (未来のヒーローたちへ; lit. 'To Tomorrow's Heroes'), performed by Shō Takeyaki, and the ending theme song is "Kaerimichi no Iro" (かえりみちの色; lit. 'The Color of the Road Home'), performed by VTuber Shibuya HAL. Crunchyroll has licensed the series, and have streamed an English dub starting on October 20, 2022.

==== Episodes ====
No.	Title	Directed by (Note: Information is taken from the ending credits of each episode.)	Written by	Storyboarded by	Original release date
1	"The Yakuza's Guide to Babysitting"; Transliteration: "Kumichō Musume to Sewagakari" (Japanese: 組長娘と世話係)	Shūhei Matsushita	Keiichirō Ōchi	Itsuro Kawasaki	July 7, 2022
Toru Kirishima is a 28 year old Lieutenant for the Sakuragi Yakuza, known as Sakuragi's Demon for his brutality. After letting a business meeting descend into a fight, his employer, Kazuhiko Sakuragi, decides to teach him responsibility and makes Kirishima guardian for his 7-year-old daughter, Yaeka. Kirishima has no experience of children, so he takes his frustration out on his long-suffering subordinate, Kei Sugihara. While walking Yaeka to school, they are followed by men from the meeting, but Kirishima is able to beat them without Yaeka noticing. Yaeka becomes noticeably sadder, even when visited by her aunt Kanami. Worried, Kirishima searches her room and finds an invitation for parents to visit the school and realizes, since Kanami has work and Kazuhiko can't be seen in public, Yaeka has no family she can invite. Convinced by Kanami, Kirishima visits the school as her guardian, cheering her up and she starts being able to talk to him normally. Yaeka wants to give Kazuhiko a picture she drew of their family crest, but she is unsure, until Kirishima tells her he was unsure about visiting the school, but he is glad he did. Reassured, Yaeka gives Kazuhiko the picture, making him very happy and bringing Kirishima and Yaeka closer together. Kazuhiko reminisces about Yaeka's mother, Miyuki, who is in the hospital.
2	"A Kind Person"; Transliteration: "Yasashii Hito" (Japanese: やさしいひと)	Tetsuya Watanabe	Keiichirō Ōchi	Itsuro Kawasaki	July 14, 2022
Yaeka misses her mother. Kazuhiko plans on visiting Miyuki in the hospital but two thugs pretending to be Kirishima and Sugihara have been causing trouble around the hospital. Kirishima discovers the imposters were hired by another rival Yakuza family. Yaeka asks Kirishima and Sugihara to attend a fireworks festival where Kirishima wins her a toy rabbit. Kirishima locates the thugs, but due to worrying about Yaeka, releases them with a minor beating. Returning home Kirishima finds Yaeka asleep, having tried to stay awake until he came home. Kirishima finds he actually likes someone waiting for him. Kirishima is surprised when Yaeka asks him what his mother was like. Kazuhiko reveals Miyuki has been in a coma for years and he stopped taking Yaeka to visit her mother as she would cry every time. Yaeka insists she doesn't want to see Miyuki. So using simple language Kirishima is able to convince Yaeka her mother loves her so much she refuses to go to heaven. Yaeka agrees to visit and Kirishima remembers that, before falling into her coma, Miyuki asked him to care for both Yaeka and Kazuhiko until she woke up. Yaeka learns Kirishima is called Sakuragi's Demon and refuses to believe it, claiming he is too nice and she wants to be like him, though Kirishima is sure Kazuhiko wouldn't be happy if she did.
3	"A Visit and a Reunion"; Transliteration: "Omimai to Saikai" (Japanese: おみまいと再会)	Naka Yamato	Keiichirō Ōchi	Hiromitsu Kanazawa	July 21, 2022
At the hospital Yaeka is able to apologize to Miyuki for not visiting and hopes she can wake up soon. She also gives her a picture of everyone, including Kirishima, so she won't be lonely. After Yaeka and Kirishima leave to get food, Kazuhiko apologizes to Miyuki for being a bad father without her. In the hospital shop, Kirishima spots Toichiro Aoi, a former yakuza member who quit after becoming a parent. Toichiro's 6-year-old son, Koki, develops a crush on Yaeka. Worried, Yaeka claims Kazuhiko isn't mad at Toichiro for leaving the family, Toichiro tearfully promises to visit some time. Kanami is amused as she knows Toichiro trained Kirishima and Kirishima has unconsciously followed Toichiro's parenting style by caring for Yaeka. Returning home, they come across a stray kitten and a girl named Hanada Ayumu, a runaway who stopped to care for the kitten. Yaeka decides to adopt the cat and names it Ohagi. Ayumu can return home. Ohagi causes chaos when she causes two Yakuza members to break a valuable antique. Kazuhiko is furious but relents when Yaeka and Ohagi ask him to. He is reminded of how Miyuki would intervene when he was furious at Kirishima, and decides Yaeka look just like Miyuki. A dangerous man who has been spying on Kirishima believes he should not be stuck in the role of a parent and decides to do something about it.
4	"Why Don't We Start Streaming?"; Transliteration: "Dōga Haishin Hajimeru ka" (Japanese: 動画配信始めるか)	Shin'ichi Tatsuta & Daichi Yoshizawa	Itsuro Kawasaki	Itsuro Kawasaki	July 28, 2022
Kazuhiko orders Kirishima to produce videos with Sugihara, explaining the changes in society now they are struggling to make money, so he wants social media videos which will make the Yakuza popular. He also demands this be kept secret from other Yakuza families since admitting they need help making money would shame the family name. Yaeka notices Kirishima is upset. In the end they create numerous videos under the name Team Cherry portraying typical Yakuza activities as amusing pastimes. Sugihara frets when other video makers start trying to discover their identities, so they post a video claiming they are fake yakuza who work for a film company, apologise for misleading their viewers, and stop posting new videos. This backfires when their supposed honesty makes them even more popular. Kazuhiko insists they start recording songs which turns into a live concert, appearing on television and even attending official functions to meet foreign royalty. Kirishima becomes so busy he can't take Yaeka to and from school anymore and she misses him. Awakening from a nightmare of neglecting Yaeka to become a popstar Kirishima swears to never make another video again and returns to caring for Yaeka, even punishing Sugihara when he tries to show him another video.
5	"Kirishima's Day Off"; Transliteration: "Kirishima no Oyasumi" (Japanese: 霧島のおやすみ)	Nao Miyoshi	Itsuro Kawasaki	Kazuya Tanaka	August 4, 2022
The news that Kirishima is a babysitter spreads, making some believe he is no longer Sakuragi's Demon, like Yanagi, a lieutenant from Kusagami Yakuza. On his day off Kirishima bumps into old classmate Rei Hojo, who comments he looks happy for once. Yanagi starts trouble at a restaurant owned by the Sakuragi family where Kirishima and Hojo are drinking, so Kirishima forces him to leave. Hojo is surprised Kirishima restrained his temper. Yanagi comes up with an idea for revenge. Yaeka and Kanami run into Ayumu and invite her over to bake cakes. Kazuhiko asks Kirishima to call and book a table at the restaurant but over the phone Kirishima hears Yanagi at the restaurant again. Yanagi announces the Kusagami family has taken over the restaurant from the Sakuragi family, bragging that Kirishima is no longer a threat, but Kirishima arrives and easily beats up Yanagi. On his way home, Kirishima meets the dangerous man spying on him, Yuri Mashiro, lieutenant of the Momoyama Yakuza, but ignores him and returns home where Yaeka has baked him a cake. Sugihara is told to bury Yanagi and his friend up to their necks as punishment. Later, Mashiro approaches the buried Yanagi and his friend and is surprised Kirishima left them alive. It is implied Mashiro murders both men.
6	"First Friend"; Transliteration: "Hajimete no Otomodachi" (Japanese: はじめてのおともだち)	Shōta Imai & Riri Honma	Itsuro Kawasaki	Shōta Imai	August 11, 2022
Kirishima is reminded it is Yaeka's birthday soon but is disappointed when Yaeka avoids the topic. On their way home they meet Hojo who informs Kirishima that Masaya Hanami, Kirishima's violent rival from high school, has finally been released from prison. Kirishima learns since Yaeka's mother entered hospital her birthdays have only been with Kazuhiko and Kanami, and because they are Yakuza she could never invite friends. Unsure what gift to get Kirishima decides to help Kanami with cooking for the party since cooking is what he remembers most about birthdays with his mother. At the park with Sugihara, Yaeka meets a young girl named Sara and they become friends. Returning home Yaeka discovers Sara and her father Leon moved in next door and are now neighbors, so she invites them to her birthday. To hide they are Yakuza Kirishima poses as Kazuhiko's butler. Meanwhile Leon has a very outgoing personality and insists he and Kazuhiko be friendly neighbors, which Kazuhiko is forced to agree to keep up their charade of normalcy. After the party Kirishima reveals he made omurice for Yaeka as it was his favourite birthday meal. Meanwhile, to celebrate leaving prison, Masaya decides to find and kill Kirishima.
7	"The Ultimate Target"; Transliteration: "Saikō no Hyōteki" (Japanese: 最高の標的)	Tetsuya Watanabe	Itsuro Kawasaki	Tetsuya Watanabe	August 18, 2022
Masaya refuses to believe Sakuragi's Demon has become a babysitter, until he sees Kirishima with Yaeka and is disappointed. Masaya reveals the only reason he joined a Yakuza family was because Kirishima did, and he hoped they would naturally meet again to fight, but he went to prison before that happened. Irritated, Kirishima reveals just a little of his suppressed Demon, before Yaeka calms him down. Masaya is collected by his boss, head of the Kakihara Yakuza, who doesn't want conflict with the Sakuragi. The whole thing is witnessed by Mashiro. Sugihara attends a business meeting with a developer named Kono, who tries to take advantage of him without Kirishima present, to pay the Sakuragi less money. However, Sugihara reveals he is still a formidable Yakuza by himself, exposes Kono's criminal activities in Sakuragi territory, cancels their deal and punishes Kono violently. Sugihara remembers being a shoplifter, until Kirishima caught him stealing from a Yakuza protected shop and then hired him for his impressive tea making skills. Mashiro visits Kono, revealing he arranged for Kono to antagonise Sugihara and was impressed at Sugihara's response. As he doesn't want his boss to know what he is doing. It is implied Mashiro murders Kono. Sugihara returns home where he is happy when Kirishima requests a cup of tea.
8	"It's Been a While"; Transliteration: "Ohisashiburi Desu" (Japanese: お久し振りです)	Shin'ichi Tatsuta	Itsuro Kawasaki	Itsuro Kawasaki & Shin'ichi Tatsuta	August 25, 2022
Sara begins attending Yaeka's school and makes several friends. Toichiro visits Kazuhiko and brings Koki to play with Yaeka. As they have not met in years Toichiro and Kazuhiko end up reminiscing. Eight years ago, before Miyuki was hospitalised, Toichiro was Kazuhiko's lieutenant and Kirishima was still an irresponsible young yakuza who hadn't earned his nickname yet. Toichiro was grateful to have found a family in the Sakuragi yakuza and was even more grateful when he met his wife Sanae and they had Koki together. Unfortunately, when he was almost killed on a job Sanae developed Hyperpnea and even a little stress could make her very ill, so Touichiro retired with Kazuhiko's blessing. His retirement allowed Kirishima to be promoted and eventually become Sakuragi's Demon. Now in the present Touichiro is glad to see everyone is happier and is not surprised that Kirishima enjoys looking after Yaeka as he also used to do it when she was a newborn. At school Yaeka becomes friends with a girl named Kaede and Kirishima is glad to see Yaeka becoming happier.
9	"The Kirishima [ ] Plan"; Transliteration: "Kirishima Marumaru Keikaku" (Japanese: 霧島◯◯計画)	Naka Yamato	Itsuro Kawasaki	Hiromitsu Kanazawa	September 1, 2022
Kirishima notices Yaeka, Sugihara and the other subordinates conspiring to hide something from him. Kazuhiko interrupts the commotion and Kirishima explains everyone's secretive behaviour. Kazuhiko scolds Kirishima for almost losing his temper, but then begins acting strangely himself to keep Kirishima distracted. The secret is abruptly revealed to be a surprise party for Kirishima's birthday which Yaeka had planned while everyone else conspired to distract Kirishima. Kirishima is touched as he had actually forgotten his own birthday. At the party Yaeka learns Kirishima actually has a favourite meal, Agedashi tofu. Kanami reminisces about how useless Kirishima was as a young man, but his absent mindedness actually led to him buying one of Yaeka's favourite toys, a stuffed sheep called Meme. They also reminisce about how Kazuhiko first met Miyuki when she was working in a flower shop. They realised they both had an interest in flower arranging and Miyuki asked Kazuhiko on a date without even realising. Despite his stern demeanour Miyuki realised Kazuhiko was a kind man and had so much fun they agreed to a second date. Kanami realised that everyone used to be happy together, but after Miyuki entered hospital it felt like everyone she cared about had drifted apart, so she is very happy Yaeka has been bringing them back together.
10	"A Bad Person"; Transliteration: "Warui Hito" (Japanese: わるいひと)	Taichi Yoshizawa & Riri Honma	Keiichirō Ōchi	Shōta Imai	September 8, 2022
A man secretly takes pictures of Yaeka. The next day Kirishima is stopped by three men; one named Shinmoto, who have kidnapped Yaeka. Kirishima is forced to submit to being beaten, until Shinmoto also hits Yaeka. Kirishima breaks Shinmoto's arm, beats him severely and almost shoots him in the head, but Yaeka wakes up. Kirishima rushes Yaeka to hospital where she is diagnosed with concussion. Kirishima is desperate for revenge, but Kazuhiko reminds him it is his job to care for Yaeka, and since it was his daughter who was attacked it is Kazuhiko's responsibility to find the culprits. Kirishima disobeys orders and leaves. Masaya bumps into him and tries to goad Kirishima into a fight, but he is thrown aside. As he passes out Masaya sees madness in Kirishima's eyes. Having orchestrated Yaeka's kidnapping, Mashiro hopes he is about to witness something fun. Sugihara learns Shinmoto used to be an Amaya Yakuza, and his associates, Igawa and Yano, used to be Shirakawa Yakuza, both families Kirishima helped destroy. Kazuhiko realises the attack on Yaeka wasn't against the Sakuragi, it was against Kirishima personally. Kirishima systematically targets former members of the Amaya and Shirakawa. From the shadows Mashiro watches with extreme pleasure as Sakuragi's Demon finally returns.
11	"Fireworks and Promises"; Transliteration: "Hanabi to Yakusoku to" (Japanese: 花火と約束と)	Tetsuya Watanabe	Keiichirō Ōchi	Itsuro Kawasaki	September 15, 2022
Kazuhiko is able to stop Kirishima. Kirishima apologizes but Kazuhiko informs him he is Yaeka's babysitter, and Sakuragi's Demon should remain in the past. Kirishima rushes back to hospital where Yaeka is awake. Days later, Yaeka asks to go to a fireworks display, but as there are no public ones. Kirishima arranges a private display instead. After the fireworks, Sugihara receives a strange text from Kirishima to look after Yaeka. Kazuhiko reveals Kirishima quit the Yakuza so he wouldn't cause them more trouble. Yaeka is heartbroken. Elsewhere, Kirishima plays Russian roulette by himself, and is disappointed when he survives. Sugihara decides to drag Kirishima back home. Mashiro locates Kirishima and boasts he knew Sakuragi's Demon was still alive deep in Kirishima's soul. He hints he orchestrated Kirishima's current situation. Kirishima almost shoots him, but misses. Toichiro sees Kirishima in a park and, even though he doesn't know what happened, advises Kirishima to go home. Sugihara and Yaeka arrive at the park. Sugihara confronts Kirishima over his selfishness demanding he apologize for making a mistake and get over it and return to normal. Kirishima realizes Sugihara is right and agrees to return. Yaeka forbids Kirishima from running away from home again.
12	"The Little Lady's Babysitter"; Transliteration: "Ojō no Sewagakari" (Japanese: お嬢の世話係)	Shin'ichi Tatsuta & Taichi Yoshizawa	Itsuro Kawasaki	Itsuro Kawasaki	September 22, 2022
Kirishima decides to atone by cutting off one of his fingers; with Sugihara trying to stop him, though they cause so much noise Kazuhiko punishes them both. Yaeka is upset that Kirishima knew her as a baby but she has no idea what he was like back then. Yaeka decides Kirishima's atonement is to tell her a story from his youth. At Toichiro's house Yaeka meets his wife Sanae and baby daughter Hina. Yaeka gets to see Kirishima with Toichiro and Sanae explains they have always acted the same, even as young men. Toichiro shows Yaeka a picture of her as a baby with Kirishima. Toichiro explains after Kirishima had gotten in yet another fight Kazuhiko put him under house arrest. During that time Kirishima began spending time with baby Yaeka, and the photograph of them was actually taken by her mother Miyuki. Yaeka decides she wants to take Miyuki flowers in hospital. Kirishima spots flowers called Kalanchoe which were his mother's favorites while pregnant with him, so Yaeka decides Kirishima should buy them. Elsewhere, Mashiro continues plotting. Kirishima takes the flowers to his mother's grave and remembers the language of flowers the Kalanchoe represents the protecting of happy memories. He promises his mother he will keep working to be a better man. Yaeka narrates the ways her life has gotten better since Kirishima became her babysitter.

== Reception ==
In 2019, The Yakuza's Guide to Babysitting was nominated for the 5th Next Manga Awards in the digital category and placed 15th out of 50 nominees.
