= Loner Life in Another World =

Japanese light novel series and its adaptations

- First light novel volume cover, featuring Touka Tsuyuri

ひとりぼっちの異世界攻略 (Hitoribotchi no Isekai Kōryaku)
- Genre: Isekai
- Novel series
- Written by: Shoji Goji
- Published by: Shōsetsuka ni Narō
- Original run: October 12, 2016 – present
- Light novel
- Written by: Shoji Goji
- Illustrated by: Booota (volume 1-2); Saku Enokimaru (volume 3+)
- Published by: Overlap
- English publisher: NA: Seven Seas Entertainment
- Imprint: Overlap Bunko
- Original run: January 25, 2018 – present
- Volumes: 19
- Manga
- Written by: Shoji Goji
- Illustrated by: Bibi
- Published by: Overlap
- English publisher: NA: Kaiten Books
- Magazine: Comic Gardo
- Original run: January 25, 2019 – present
- Volumes: 29
- Anime television series
- Directed by: Akio Kazumi
- Written by: Kenta Ihara
- Music by: Shūji Katayama
- Studio: Hayabusa Film; Passione (Note: Animation production assistance (アニメーション制作協力) for all episodes provided by Frontier Engine.)
- Licensed by: Sentai Filmworks: SA/SEA: Muse Communication
- Original network: Tokyo MX, BS Fuji, AT-X
- Original run: October 4, 2024 – present
- Episodes: 12
- icon

Loner Life in Another World (Japanese: ひとりぼっちの異世界攻略, Hepburn: Hitoribotchi no Isekai Kōryaku) is a Japanese light novel series written by Shoji Goji. The series originated on the Shōsetsuka ni Narō website in October 2016, before being published in print with illustrations by Booota and Saku Enokimaru by Overlap beginning in January 2018. A manga adaptation, illustrated by Bibi, began serialization on the Comic Gardo website in January 2019. An anime television series adaptation produced by Hayabusa Film and Passione aired from October to December 2024. A second season has been announced.

== Plot ==
An entire class of high school students is summoned to another world by its god, who selected them to become heroes. The god allowed each of the students to pick a special skill of their choice, but one of the students, Haruka, a loner student, tried to escape the selection ritual but got dragged along anyway. Since he had arrived later than the others the god allowed him to keep all the remaining skills the other students did not pick. Despite not having a single powerful skill, Haruka makes use of his multiple abilities and his ingenuity in using them to live a comfortable life by himself in the other world, until his classmates start having trouble trying to deal with their new environment and conflicts between them, forcing him to take action, leave his loner existence and help them.

== Characters ==
=== Main characters ===
Haruka (遥)
Voiced by: Shūichirō Umeda (Japanese); Nathan Wilson (English)
The main protagonist. Self-isolated in his class, he manages to thrive as a "loner" in his new world using the skills thrust upon him. After being transported to the other world, he refers to his former classmates via the cliques they had formed in their original world, e.g. "Mean Girls", "Nerds", "Delinquents", etc., being either ignorant or uncaring of their actual names (which tends to constantly exasperate the girls, especially the Class Rep). One of his Skills is "Master of None", which means although he can pick up other Skills with almost incredible ease, he levels up very slowly compared to the other students; however, despite the apparent uselessness of his acquired Skills, he is able to use and combine them in such a way as to overcome almost any situation. Because of his low levels and preferring his "Loner" status, he refuses to join any of the student parties.
Touka Tsuyuri (ツユリトウカ, Tsuyuri Touka)
Voiced by: Haruka Shiraishi (Japanese); Monica Rial (English)
The class representative, she is responsible and reliable, always trying to keep the other students together and in line, and is constantly worried about Haruka, who is her childhood friend and for whom she has feelings for despite his "antics". Even though she (and all of the other girls) are exasperated by Haruka's poor communication skills and his constantly getting into dangerous situations, she and the other class members come to rely on and trust him for his strength and resourcefulness (plus the fact that he is far safer to be around than the Delinquents who had tried to dominate them). She also has the Skill "Hijack" (which can only be used by killing another Skill-owner), but will never use it; only Haruka and the Nerds know about her possessing this Skill. Another possible source of exasperation and frustration for her is that although she and the other girls (because of their higher/stronger Levels) assert that it's their duty to protect Haruka because of his low Level, he ends up protecting them instead.
Angelica
Voiced by: Saori Hayami (Japanese); Annie Wild (English)
A female knight who was afflicted with a curse, turning her into a skeleton and becoming the final boss of the dungeon, the Dungeon Emperor, where she remained for possibly centuries, alone and effectively immortal. After Haruka breaks the curse and frees her by using his Subjugate Skill, he also manages to restore her humanity and she becomes one of his closest friends and companions. She also has feelings for Haruka.

=== Students ===
Shield Girl
Voiced by: Nozomi Furuki (Japanese); Allison Sumrall (English)
Library Commission
Voiced by: Haruna Terada (Japanese); Olivia Swasey (English)
Handicraft Girl
Voiced by: Manami Uchida (Japanese); Shannon Emerick (English)
Cooking Girl
Voiced by: Arisa Nakada (Japanese); Alyssa Marek (English)
Nagisa Fukunuki (福貫 凪紗)
Voiced by: Maria Sashide (Japanese); Brittney Karbowski (English)
Referred to by Haruka as "Nudist Girl" because of her tendency to want to strip down at very inappropriate times.
Chika Chinami (千波 千佳)
Voiced by: Asuka Shiori (Japanese); Elissa Cuellar (English)
Referred to by Haruka as "Fish Girl" after she appears in his tent one morning telling him that there will be grilled fish for breakfast.
Vice Chairwomen
Voiced by: Rika Abe (Vice A), Kanon Takao (Vice B), Mari Takahashi (Vice C) (Japanese); Genevieve Simmons (Vice A), Christina Kelly (Vice B), Luci Christian (Vice C) (English)
Class Rep's closest friends who help her keep the rest of the class in check.
Wakana Shimazaki (島崎 若菜)
Voiced by: Hina Suguta (Japanese); Kira Vincent-Davis (English)
The leader of the Gals (Haruka keeps referring to them as "the mean girls"). In the light novels, Haruka keeps calling her "Queen Bee". She was foremost in driving the Nerds away, but now (along with her subordinates) wants to find them and sincerely apologize. In Volume One of the light novels, it is revealed that she had been a magazine model.
Gals
Voiced by: Mai Kanno (Gal A), Yuki Nakashima (Gal D) (Japanese); Karlii Hoch (Gal A), Natalie Rial (Gal D) (English)
Gal Leader Shimazaki's subordinates.
Volleyball Club Girls
Voiced by: Yuka Iwahashi, (Volleyball Club Girl A), Haruna Mikawa (Volleyball Club Girl B) (Japanese); Juliet Simmons (Volleyball Club Girl A), Emi Lo (English)
Members of the Volleyball Club
Nerds (オタ, Ota)
Voiced by: Kyōhei Natsume (Tatsuya Oda/Nerd A), Taichi Ichikawa (Nerd B), Yū Okano (Nerd C), Shinnosuke Tokudome (Nerd D) (Japanese); Blake Shepard (Tatsuya Oda/Nerd A), Joshua Swasey (Nerd B), Greg Ayres (Nerd C), Joe Daniels (Nerd D) (English)
Avid fans of anime and games, they are amongst the strongest students due to their knowledge of isekai, which allowed them to choose magic skills. While they were originally helping the rest of the class, a series of mistaken events causes their classmates to drive them away. While the Nerds seem to be the group Haruka is closest to, he declines to join them, thinking that his low Level status will hold them back.
Jocks (脳筋莫迦, Nōkin Baka)
Voiced by: Hiromu Mineta (Haruomi Kakizaki/Jock A), Kento Hama (Jock B), Haruki Ishiya (Jock C), Keisuke Iwamura (Jock E), (Japanese); Jack Stansbury (Haruomi Kakizaki/Jock A), Blake Weir (Jock B), Jovan Jackson (Jock C), John Gremillion (Jock E) (English)
Sports enthusiasts who are the physically strongest amongst the students. While Haruka refers to them as "meatheads", they are basically decent and honorable.
Delinquents (不良, Furyō)
Voiced by: Tomohiro Yamaguchi (Delinquent A), Fumiya Imai (Delinquent B), Yōhei Matsuoka (Delinquent E), Kōdai Sakai (Delinquent F) (Japanese); Ben McLaughlin (Delinquent A), Andrew Love (Delinquent B), James Marler (Delinquent E), Shane Fenimore (Delinquent F) (English)
Troublemaking students who intend to use their powers against their classmates in order to rule over them (especially to create a harem out of their female classmates). However, their arrogance proves to be their fatal undoing.
Tanaka
Voiced by: Shota Hayama (Japanese); Adam Gibbs (English)
A mathematical genius, but another loner like Haruka; he attaches himself to the Delinquents and teaches them how to use their powers while secretly having an agenda of his own.

=== Residents of Omui ===
Merielle
Voiced by: Aguri Ōnishi
The daughter of the local Duke. Haruka rescues her from bandits, but (true to form and much to her annoyance) keeps forgetting her name.
Gatek
Voiced by: Shohei Yamaguchi (Japanese); John Hallmark (English)
An Adventurer.
Ofter
Voiced by: Atsushi Imaruoka (Japanese); Scott Gibbs (English)
An Adventurer.
Guild Boss
Voiced by: Tetsu Inada
The head of the town of Omui's Adventurers' Guild.

== Media ==
=== Light novels ===
Written by Shoji Goji, the series began publication on the novel posting website Shōsetsuka ni Narō on October 12, 2016. The series was later acquired by Overlap, who began publishing the series in print with illustrations by Booota and Saku Enokimaru on January 25, 2018. As of October 2026, nineteen volumes have been released.

In February 2021, Seven Seas Entertainment announced that they licensed the series for English publication.

==== Volume list ====
No.	Original release date	Original ISBN	English release date	English ISBN
1	January 25, 2018	978-4-86554-302-5	August 3, 2021 (print); July 1, 2021 (digital)	978-1-64827-419-0
2	June 25, 2018	978-4-86554-362-9	July 5, 2022 (print); May 26, 2022 (digital)	978-1-64827-438-1
3	February 25, 2020	978-4-86554-478-7	October 25, 2022 (print); September 15, 2022 (digital)	978-1-64827-457-2
4	May 25, 2020	978-4-86554-661-3	January 31, 2023 (print); December 15, 2022 (digital)	978-1-63858-165-9
5	October 25, 2020	978-4-86554-761-0	June 20, 2023 (print); May 11, 2023 (digital)	978-1-63858-299-1
6	January 25, 2021	978-4-86554-824-2	August 22, 2023 (print); July 13, 2023 (digital)	978-1-63858-647-0
7	May 25, 2021	978-4-86554-910-2	November 7, 2023	978-1-63858-880-1
8	October 25, 2021	978-4-8240-0001-9	March 5, 2024 (print); February 8, 2024 (digital)	979-8-88843-434-5
9	March 25, 2022	978-4-8240-0130-6	July 9, 2024 (print); June 20, 2024 (digital)	979-8-88843-469-7
10	August 25, 2022	978-4-8240-0270-9	November 12, 2024 (print); October 17, 2024 (digital)	979-8-88843-750-6
11	February 25, 2023	978-4-8240-0414-7	March 11, 2025 (print); February 13, 2025 (digital)	979-8-89160-578-7
12	June 25, 2023	978-4-8240-0501-4	July 8, 2025 (print); June 5, 2025 (digital)	979-8-89160-862-7
13	January 25, 2024	978-4-8240-0712-4	November 18, 2025	979-8-89373-382-2
14	April 25, 2024	978-4-8240-0796-4	April 21, 2026 (print); March 26, 2026 (digital)	979-8-89373-665-6
15	October 25, 2024	978-4-8240-0971-5	September 29, 2026 (print); August 20, 2026 (digital)	979-8-89561-214-9
16	April 25, 2025	978-4-8240-1151-0	April 13, 2027	979-8-89765-620-2
17	October 25, 2025	978-4-8240-1339-2	—	—
18	April 20, 2026	978-4-8240-1564-8	—	—
19	October 20, 2026	978-4-8240-1887-8	—	—

=== Manga ===
A manga adaptation, illustrated by Bibi, began serialization on the Comic Gardo manga website on January 25, 2019. As of October 2026, the manga's individual chapters have been collected into twenty-nine tankōbon volumes.

In March 2020, Kaiten Books announced that they had licensed the manga for English publication.

==== Volume list ====
No.	Original release date	Original ISBN	English release date	English ISBN
1	September 25, 2019	978-4-8655-4550-0	March 31, 2020 (digital); August 19, 2020 (print)	978-1-952241-00-0
2	February 25, 2020	978-4-8655-4617-0	July 10, 2020 (digital); November 30, 2020 (print)	978-1-952241-05-5
3	May 25, 2020	978-4-8655-4670-5	November 20, 2020 (digital); June 15, 2021 (print)	978-1-952241-13-0
4	July 25, 2020	978-4-8655-4709-2	May 7, 2021 (digital); January 4, 2022 (print)	978-1-952241-23-9
5	October 25, 2020	978-4-8655-4773-3	September 10, 2021 (digital); June 23, 2022 (print)	978-1-952241-29-1
6	January 25, 2021	978-4-8655-4837-2	May 27, 2022 (digital); December 9, 2022 (print)	978-1-952241-41-3
7	May 25, 2021	978-4-8655-4924-9	September 16, 2022 (digital); June 9, 2023 (print)	978-1-952241-45-1
8	August 25, 2021	978-4-8655-4991-1	February 14, 2023 (digital); February 9, 2024 (print)	978-1-952241-55-0
9	October 25, 2021	978-4-8240-0035-4	August 11, 2023 (digital); January 31, 2025 (print)	978-1-952241-59-8
10	January 25, 2022	978-4-8240-0099-6	December 22, 2023 (digital); TBA (print)	978-1-952241-65-9
11	March 25, 2022	978-4-8240-0143-6	November 22, 2024 (digital); TBA (print)	978-1-952241-75-8
12	May 25, 2022	978-4-8240-0202-0	June 20, 2025 (digital); TBA (print)	978-1-952241-81-9
13	August 25, 2022	978-4-8240-0284-6	—	—
14	November 25, 2022	978-4-8240-0348-5	—	—
15	February 25, 2023	978-4-8240-0429-1	—	—
16	June 25, 2023	978-4-8240-0540-3	—	—
17	August 25, 2023	978-4-8240-0596-0	—	—
18	January 25, 2024	978-4-8240-0724-7	—	—
19	April 25, 2024	978-4-8240-0814-5	—	—
20	September 25, 2024	978-4-8240-0958-6	—	—
21	October 25, 2024	978-4-8240-0989-0	—	—
22	November 25, 2024	978-4-8240-1006-3	—	—
23	February 25, 2025	978-4-8240-1103-9	—	—
24	June 25, 2025	978-4-8240-1237-1	—	—
25	September 25, 2025	978-4-8240-1355-2	—	—
26	January 25, 2026	978-4-8240-1505-1	—	—
27	July 20, 2026	978-4-8240-1758-1	—	—
28	August 20, 2026	978-4-8240-1817-5	—	—
29	October 20, 2026	978-4-8240-1906-6	—	—

=== Anime ===
An anime television series adaptation was announced during the second livestream for the "10th Anniversary Memorial Overlap Bunko All-Star Assemble Special" event on January 21, 2024. It is produced by Hayabusa Film and Passione (in cooperation with Frontier Engine) and directed by Akio Kazumi, with scripts written by Kenta Ihara, characters designed by Keiya Nakano, and music composed by Shūji Katayama. The series aired from October 4 to December 20, 2024, on Tokyo MX and BS Fuji. (Note: Tokyo MX lists the series premiere on October 3, 2024, at 24:00, which is effectively October 4 at midnight JST.) The opening theme song is "ODD NUMBER", performed by Yoshino, while the ending theme song is "Hello to Goodbye" (ハローとグッバイ; Hello and Goodbye), performed by Kujiraki. Sentai Filmworks licensed the series in North America, Australia and British Isles for streaming on Hidive. Muse Communication licensed the series in South and Southeast Asia.

A second season was announced during the "Great Overlap Bunko All-Star Gathering Special 2026" second livestream on July 4, 2026.

==== Episodes ====
No.	Title	Directed by	Written by	Storyboarded by	Original release date (Note: Episodes are released on ABEMA, HIDIVE and simulcast platforms by Muse a week before their televised airings.)
1	"Loner with the Worst Skills"; Transliteration: "Bocchi to Baddo Sukiru" (Japanese: ぼっちとバッドスキル)	Yuta Kida	Kenta Ihara	Akio Kazumi	October 4, 2024
At a school, a magic circle appears, transporting everyone in one classroom to an alternate world, with class loner Haruka (the only one who tried to escape) ending up being the last person transported. An eccentric-looking God reveals that his classmates have already selected the best skills and equipment, so Haruka's only choices are useless skills nobody else wanted. Tired by his complaining, the God gives him all the useless skills and equipment left. Arriving in a forest, Haruka applies all his available skill points to Luck and begins experimenting with what he has. He discovers a Loner skill that enables him to survive alone. He also relies on Contact Lenses that give him appraisal abilities. Discovering a cave, he sets up camp and discovers Loner keeps monsters away. Discovering goblins, he defeats them with the only weapon he can use, a Wooden Staff. Realizing he could live comfortably by upgrading his skills properly, he sets about training and levelling up. On Day Five, he detects his classmates wandering around in their various groups, including the Class Rep (on whom he has a crush), but avoids them.
2	"Reunion"; Transliteration: "Saikai" (Japanese: 再会)	Chikayo Nakamura	Kenta Ihara	Akio Kazumi	October 11, 2024
Haruka continues his levelling up, which has stalled at level 3 due to the useless skill Master of None. He eventually encounters the class Nerds, who have already reached level 16 as magicians and warriors due to their familiarity with Isekai media, but are now on their own. After he takes them in and feeds them, they explain that the Delinquents (another student class clique) attempted to use the skills Charm and Puppeteer to hypnotize all of the girls into a harem; the Nerds used Magic Seal to prevent the Delinquents from using those skills, causing them to later return and destroy the camp (which the Nerds had been primarily responsible for constructing). Everyone blamed the Nerds for provoking the Delinquents and drove them away. The Nerds leave to reach the nearest town and start lives as Adventurers. Haruka visits the destroyed and now-deserted camp and finds another clique, the Gals, regretting their actions. Haruka advises them to learn to survive and then find the Nerds to apologize. He agrees to help them, but accidentally activates his skill Subjugate, turning the Gals into mindless slaves. Haruka panics at what the Class Rep will do to him if she finds out, only for her to appear. Elsewhere, the Delinquents plan to take the girls by force.
3	"Life With The Girls"; Transliteration: "Joshi-tachi to no Seikatsu" (Japanese: 女子たちとの生活)	Yū Yabuuchi	Kenta Ihara	Akio Kazumi	October 18, 2024
The effect of Haruka's Subjugation soon wears off. Haruka admits his renovated cave is large enough to house everybody, and agrees to the Class Rep's request that she and the rest of the girls temporarily stay with him. When they arrive at his "house" (where Haruka has built bedrooms, a kitchen and bathroom), Haruka is horrified when everyone except the Class Rep strips naked and takes over the bath. That night, the Class Rep admits to having failed as a leader, but Haruka assures her nobody (except the Nerds) could have prepared for such an extreme situation. The next morning, the girls cook fish (which so far Haruka has been unable to catch). His Packing skill, which can capture objects within a 3D space, is able capture one girl's Lightning magic and unlock it permanently as one of his own skills. The girls plan to leave to find a town, but Haruka decides to help them train first (which gets off to a rocky start, but ends with the girls eventually learning how to successfully fight monsters). The Class Rep then tells Haruka that he is coming with them to the town, much to his annoyance as he wants to remain in the forest and resume his Loner life. Elsewhere, one of the class boys is murdered by a hooded student.
4	"Headed to Town"; Transliteration: "Machi o Mezashite" (Japanese: 街を目指して)	Ryo Yasumura	Kenta Ihara	Akio Kazumi	October 25, 2024
Fighting orcs along the way while escorting the girls, Haruka encounters the Jocks, who warn him about the dangerous skill Hijack; since the Delinquents do not possess Hijack, it is possible that one of the girls does. After the Jocks leave, the Class Rep admits to Haruka that she's the one with Hijack, which enables the stealing of another person's skills via murder. Haruka reveals that he already knew and is not afraid of the Class Rep. Haruka combines skills attempting to fly and invents Air Walk, which allows him to walk on steps of air. After they leave the forest, Haruka spots a band of people being attacked by wolves and is convinced by the Class Rep to rescue them. Defeating the wolves, he meets Ofter and his adventuring party. Everyone travels together to the nearby town of Omui. Elsewhere, the Delinquents decide to hunt down the Nerds to get back their Charm and Puppeteer skills before going after the girls. Spying on them, the Jocks are worried.
5	"Life in Town"; Transliteration: "Machi no Kurashi" (Japanese: 街の暮らし)	Yusuke Onoda	Kenta Ihara	Ichizo Kobayashi	November 1, 2024
The Class Rep takes everyone to register at the Adventurer's Guild. As they are all above level 30, the girls register without issue, but because new adventurers must be level 10 and in a party, level 9 Haruka with his Loner skill cannot register. Haruka attempts to sell his monster crystals but has so many the guild runs out of money, so the Guild Boss offers a down payment of 8 million. While shopping at a rare items caravan, Haruka finds a Combine-Seven necklace that allows him to combine the effects of seven items onto 1 normal item. However, he is startled by the Class Rep and falls onto the display, combining items at random. The furious merchant demands payment for everything he combined. Penniless again and missing the forest, Haruka uses his new Invisibility Cloak to slip out of town (as only adventurers with ID passes are allowed to leave town); however, he witnesses a carriage being attacked by bandits, whom he defeats. The carriage belongs to Merielle, and while escorting her home Haruka complains about Omui, realising too late that she is the daughter of the Lord of Omui. Insulted, she refuses to let him escape until she has proven Omui's value. Elsewhere, the Jocks and Delinquents prepare to fight, when the hooded student suddenly stabs a Delinquent in the back.
6	"Alone Again"; Transliteration: "Futatabi Bocchi e" (Japanese: 再びぼっちへ)	Chikayo Nakamura	Kenta Ihara	Chikayo Nakamura & Akio Kazumi	November 8, 2024
The hooded student kills all four Delinquents. Merielle drags Haruka to her father's mansion to reward him with money and an Omui citizenship ID. However, he keeps ignoring her, so she eventually lets him leave. The Class Rep confines him to the inn, unaware that his ID allows him to leave Omui. The next day, reaching his cave, he discovers the Jocks all badly wounded. They tell him that the hooded student attacked them, stole their weapons and is going after the Class Rep to acquire Hijack. Haruka uses his healing mushroom potions to restore the Jocks, sends them to Omui, then experiments with randomly combining skills, hoping to invent something useful. After defeating a Goblin Emperor, he reaches level 11 and names his new skill Made Up: a lightning-fast attack with instant activation. He confronts the hooded student: Tanaka, a mathematical genius who, like Haruka, didn't fit into any of the groups. Tanaka had been manipulating the Delinquents and had caused the class to split up, planning his murders so that the only classmates left are girls, Jocks and Nerds. Haruka challenges him to fight.
7	"Haruka & the Hooded Man"; Transliteration: "Haruka to Fūdo no Otoko" (Japanese: 遥とフードの男)	Yuta Kida	Satoshi Ozaki	Toshikatsu Tokoro	November 15, 2024
Tanaka uses Meddle on Haruka, which slows down his movements. While Tanaka tries to burn him, Haruka absorbs his magic with a combined magic staff. Tanaka has weapon skills from the Delinquents and has Copycat, which lets him copy skills; however, Copycat only lets him use a skill three times. Tanaka unleashes Death, but Haruka recovers (his Well-Being skill making him resistant to health-based attacks; plus maxing out his Luck gave him a chance to avoid dying). Tanaka demands to know how Haruka can resist Meddle, and Haruka reveals that the whole time he had been using Dummy to move his own body like a puppet. After Tanaka runs out of moves, Haruka tells him that Tanaka can never win because he only stole other people's skills and never really Levelled himself up, then, using Made Up, he kills Tanaka. Severely injured, Haruka is recovered by the Nerds and escorted back to Omui, where The Gals apologize to The Nerds. Haruka again tries to sneak away, only for the Class Rep to stop him with a hug. She then turns him over to the rest of the girls, who forcibly escort him back into town and subject him to a group scolding that lasts until sunrise.
8	"Dungeon Exploration"; Transliteration: "Meikyū Tansaku" (Japanese: 迷宮探索)	Hiroto Kato	Kenta Ihara	Hiroto Kato	November 22, 2024
The Nerds secretly plan to look for an artifact that will make them irresistible to women, inspiring Haruka to go after it himself (primarily to keep the girls from constantly scolding him). En route to the dungeon, he encounters and annihilates a horde of Orcs, then spends the rest of the day searching the dungeon's upper floor without success. Returning to town, he finds everyone on high alert because of a warning about an attacking horde; when he reveals that he killed them all, everyone scolds him for being reckless. The next day, he questions the Rare Item shop keeper about the artifact; the shop keeper mentions a Charisma-boosting Ring on the dungeon's lowest level. The Nerds overhear Haruka's plan to find it and report this to the Class Rep; the next day when Haruka heads to the dungeon he finds himself tailed by all of his classmates, who are determined to stop him. Fleeing into the dungeon, he accidentally falls through a wall and all the way down to its 101st level. Uninjured, he enters the Final Boss Room, only to face the Dungeon Emperor, an armed skeleton.
9	"The Loner & the Dungeon Emperor"; Transliteration: "Bocchi to Meikyū-kō" (Japanese: ぼっちと迷宮皇)	Hiroto Kato	Kenta Ihara	Hiroto Kato	November 29, 2024
Merielle's father puts the guild on high alert as storm clouds surround the dungeon. While the Dungeon Emperor has superior skills, Haruka notices that it possesses no bloodlust and realizes that the Emperor is being controlled by the dark miasma surrounding it. Realizing that the Emperor wants to die, Haruka banishes the miasma with holy magic, then tries to mercy-kill the Emperor, only to accidentally use Subjugate on it. This resets the grateful Emperor to Level 1 and reveals her name: Angelica. Trying to leave, Haruka and Angelica move up to Floor 100. Now, Haruka must beat the Floor 100 Dungeon King, then every floor boss from Floor 99 back up to the surface. Haruka beats the King by accident with his maxed-out Luck, and Angelica loots its armor, gaining a more feminine body, finding out after the fact that the armor is actually cursed. The Class Rep and the others reach Floor 50. The guild realize that Haruka and the others are missing. Haruka and Angelica continue beating the floor bosses; in Floor 95, they encounter a Living Sword Boss, which Angelica defeats. Working together, the class defeats the Floor 50 boss. Haruka and Angelica reach Floor 85, but the dungeon begins shaking as a monster army begins moving nearby.
10	"Stampede"; Transliteration: "Sutanpīdo" (Japanese: スタンピード)	Yusuke Onoda	Satoshi Ozaki	Takashi Kamei	December 6, 2024
Haruka and Angelica continue fighting their way up floors, defeating the Floor Bosses and collecting rare magical items along the way, while the students make their way down. Back at Omui, after the adventurers beat off two attack waves, the Guild Boss sends Gatak and a very reluctant Merielle to the dungeon warn the students about the stampede and get Haruka, who may be the only one who can save Omui. Haruka gives three powerful magical items to Angelica and they seem to have a powerful effect on her. While making their way through a particularly brutal fire plain floor, Haruka and Angelica stop to rest on a ledge above the plain where it is slightly cooler. Gatak and Merielle arrive on the floor the students have reached and tell them about the monster attack. Haruka and the Class Rep heard each others voices through the passage in the wall he fell down and she tells him about the attack on Omui. Gatak tells Haruka that the only way to stop the Stampede is to kill the Dungeon Emperor, but Haruka becomes determined to not only find a way to stop the rampaging monsters but also save Angelica.
11	"Dungeon Escape"; Transliteration: "Meikyū Dasshutsu" (Japanese: 迷宮脱出)	Yu Yabuuchi	Kenta Ihara	Akio Kazumi	December 13, 2024
The final humungous wave of monsters bear down on Omui and the adventurers, who have barely managed to beat back two waves, prepare for the final assault. Back at the dungeon, the students are on the point of being annihilated by the Sphinx floor boss when Haruka and Angelica arrive just in time to defeat it. Haruka assures everyone that he has a plan to save Omui, and they all use the floor's teleport portal to reach the surface. They manage to reach Omui just as the monsters appear, and Haruka sends out Angelica. Using her Dungeon Emperor power, she transports all of the attacking monsters back into the dungeon. Everyone is stunned at the monsters' disappearance, but Haruka provides a basic explanation, assures them that the monsters will not be stampeding again and introduces Angelica as the Dungeon Emperor (to everyone's shock); however, Omui has been saved and everyone rejoices. Back at the inn, Haruka sets out all of the rare and powerful items he had earned and collected in the dungeon and announces a massive sale, which sends the girls into such a buying frenzy that the boys can't stand against them (however, Haruka provides them with consolation items). As everyone inspects their new purchases, Haruka wonders whether or not Angelica (a loner not unlike himself) will be able to survive in this new world she has entered.
12	"Loner & Loner"; Transliteration: "Botchi to Botchi" (Japanese: ぼっちとぼっち)	Takahide Ejiri	Kenta Ihara	Akio Kazumi	December 20, 2024
Following Haruka's sale and after learning that Haruka had used his Subjugation Skill to free Angelica, the Class Rep and the girls drag her off to learn her story and then to the bath, where they find out when they help her remove her armor that her body has been restored! After checking his updated Skill stats, Haruka decides to return to the forest for training in his new abilities, with Angelica accompanying him (which makes the Class Rep a touch uneasy). Once back at his cave home, Haruka discovers that Angelica now has a human form again, thanks to the blessed items from the dungeon that he gave her which broke the curses on her, but that she is still unable to speak and that she wants to stay with him. After a few days, they return to Omui, where she is welcomed back by the girls (naturally, the other boys are dying to hear from Haruka what he and Angelica had been up top during their alone time). Seeing her no longer alone, Haruka is about to leave when she comes up to him and speaks for the first time, thanking him. Seeing how everyone is adjusting to their new life in this new world, Haruka is now determined to become stronger and conquer this world...as a Loner.

== Reception ==
Rebecca Silverman from Anime News Network praised the humor and illustrations, though she had mixed feelings on the character Haruka. Demelza from Anime UK News praised the story, especially its action and comedy elements.

The series has 1.9 million copies in circulation between its digital and print releases.

== See also ==
- Higehiro: Light novel series illustrated by the illustrator of volume 1 and volume 2 of Loner Life in Another World's light novels.
