= Ego-Wrappin' discography =

- Studio albums: 9
- EPs: 7
- Compilation albums: 2
- Singles: 9
- Video albums: 5

The discography of Japanese band Ego-Wrappin' includes nine studio albums, two compilation albums, seven extended plays and nine singles. Ego-Wrappin' was formed in 1996, and originally released music through independent labels Metro Crew Records and RD Records, while later distributing through Universal Music Japan and Toy's Factory.

== Discography ==
=== Studio albums ===
List of albums, with selected chart positions
Title	Album details	Peak positions			Sales	Certifications
Title	Album details	JPN Oricon (Note: Sources for chart positions are as follows: Shikisai no Blues, Michishio no Romance, "Kuchibashi ni Cherry", Night Food, Merry Merry, "Vermouth Flowers", Ego-Wrappin' and the Gossip of Jaxx, Sure Shot, "Micro Boy to Macro Girl".)	JPN Billboard (Note: Sources for chart positions are as follows: Route 20 Hit the Road.)	KOR Overseas	Sales	Certifications
Blue Speaker	Released: June 25, 1998; Label: RD Records; Formats: CD, digital download	—	—	—		
Michishio no Romance (満ち汐のロマンス; "Tide Flow Romance")	Released: May 30, 2001; Label: Minor Swing; Formats: CD, LP, digital download	8	—	—	JPN: 153,000	RIAJ: Gold
Night Food	Released: July 5, 2002; Label: Minor Swing; Formats: CD, LP, digital download	5	—	—	JPN: 334,000	RIAJ: Gold
Merry Merry	Released: September 8, 2004; Label: Minor Swing; Formats: CD, LP, digital download	4	—	—	JPN: 87,000	RIAJ: Gold
On the Rocks!	Released: May 17, 2006; Label: Minor Swing; Formats: CD, digital download	9	—	—	JPN: 39,000	
Ego-Wrappin' and the Gossip of Jaxx	Released: February 18, 2009; Label: Minor Swing; Formats: CD, digital download	14	— (Note: The album charted at number 17 on the Top Albums Sales chart.)	—	JPN: 18,000	
Naimono Nedari no Deadheat (ないものねだりのデッドヒート; "Asking-for-Too-Much Deadheat")	Released: September 15, 2010; Label: Minor Swing; Formats: CD, LP, digital download	13	— (Note: The album charted at number 15 on the Top Albums Sales chart.)	30	JPN: 17,000	
Steal a Person's Heart	Released: April 10, 2013; Label: Toy's Factory; Formats: CD, digital download	14	— (Note: The album charted at number 13 on the Top Albums Sales chart.)	—		
Dream Baby Dream	Released: May 22, 2019; Label: Toy's Factory; Formats: CD, digital download	6	—	—	JPN: 6,252	
"—" denotes items which did not chart, or were not released in this region.

=== Extended plays ===
List of extended plays, with selected chart positions
Title	Album details	Peak positions	Sales
Title	Album details	JPN Oricon	Sales
Calling Me	Released: October 15, 1996; Label: Metro Crew Records; Formats: CD	—	
Calling Me Remix	Released: November 1997; Label: Metro Crew Records; Formats: CD	—	
His Choice of Shoes Is Ill!	Released: February 20, 1999; Label: RD Records; Formats: CD, LP, digital download	—	
Swing for Joy	Released: November 13, 1999; Label: RD Records; Formats: CD, LP, digital download	—	
Shikisai no Blues (色彩のブルース, Shikisai no Burūsu; "Blues of Color")	Released: September 2, 2000; Label: RD Records; Formats: CD, LP, digital download	66	JPN: 49,000
Track Scorcher	Released: February 11, 2005; Label: Minor Swing; Formats: LP	—	
Buzz Tracks	Released: February 11, 2005; Label: Minor Swing; Formats: LP	—	
"—" denotes items which did not chart.

=== Compilation albums ===
List of compilation albums, with selected chart positions
Title	Album details	Peak positions				Sales
Title	Album details	JPN Oricon	JPN Billboard	KOR	KOR Overseas	Sales
Best Wrappin' 1996–2008 (ベストラッピン, Besutorappin)	Released: October 15, 2008; Label: Minor Swing; Formats: CD, digital download	4	— (Note: The album charted at number 3 on the Top Albums Sales chart.)	67	19	JPN: 71,000
Route 20 Hit the Road	Released: April 20, 2016; Label: Toy's Factory; Formats: CD, digital download	9	11	—	—	
"—" denotes items which did not chart, or were not released in this region.

=== Singles ===
==== As lead artist ====
List of singles, with selected chart positions
Title	Year	Peak chart positions		Sales	Album
Title	Year	JPN Oricon	JPN Billboard (Note: Sources for chart positions are as follows: "Go Action", "We Are Here", "Brand New Day", "Mekon no Tsuki", "Neon Sign Stomp".)	Sales	Album
"Midnight Dejavu (Shikisai no Blues)" (～Midnight Dejavu～色彩のブルース; "Blues of Color")	2001	15	—	JPN: 193,000	Shikisai no Blues
"Kuchibashi ni Cherry" (くちばしにチェリー; "Beaks and Cherries")	2002	9	—	JPN: 85,000	Night Food
"Go Action"	2008	19	44	JPN: 9,000	Best Wrappin' 1996–2008 / Ego Wrappin' and the Gossip of Jaxx
Sure Shot (Note: A split single between Brahman and Ego-Wrappin', who collaborated on the leading song "We Are Here".) (Brahman+Ego-Wrappin')	2010	12	— (Note: The single charted at number 10 on the Top Single Sales chart.)		Non-album single
"Brand New Day"	2010	37	40	JPN: 4,000	Naimono Nedari no Deadheat
"Love Scene"	2010	37	—	JPN: 4,000	Naimono Nedari no Deadheat
Bright Time (Note: Four track single featuring music from the soundtrack of Reverse Edge: Ōkawabata Tanteisha, led by the song "Neon Sign Stomp".)	2014	21	— (Note: The single charted at number 17 on the Top Single Sales chart.)		Route 20 Hit the Road
"—" denotes items that were released before the creation of the Billboard Japan Hot 100 in February 2008, or items that did not chart.

==== As featured artist ====
List of singles, with selected chart positions
Title	Year	Peak chart positions		Album
Title	Year	JPN Oricon	JPN Billboard	Album
"Vermouth Flowers" (ヴェルモット・フラワーズ) (Katteni-Shiyagare+Ego-Wrappin')	2006	70	—	Black Magic Voodoo Cafe
"Heat" (Pushim featuring Ego-Wrappin')	2013	—	70	It's a Drama
"Micro Boy to Macro Girl" (ミクロボーイとマクロガール) (Scha Dara Parr to Ego-Wrappin')	2017	—	— (Note: The single charted at number 31 on the Billboard Radio Songs chart.)	Non-album single
"—" denotes items that were released before the creation of the Billboard Japan Hot 100 in February 2008, or items that did not chart.

=== Promotional singles ===
List of singles, with selected chart positions
Title	Year	Peak chart positions	Album
Title	Year	JPN Billboard	Album
"A Love Song" (featuring Determinations)	1999	—	Swing for Joy
"Flowers"	2000	—	Shikisai no Blues
"Samba de Orfeu (Black Sunday)"	2000	—	Justa Record Presents: Ska Stock, Tribute to the Skatalites
"Psychoanalysis" (サイコアナルシス)	2001	—	Michishio no Romance
"Paranoia"	2001	—	Michishio no Romance
"Cassavetes" (カサヴェテス)	2004	—	Merry Merry
"Mother Ship"	2006	—	On the Rocks!
"Tengoku to Shiroi Pierrot" (天国と白いピエロ; "Heaven and a White Clown")	2006	—	On the Rocks!
"Darui" (だるい; "Sluggish")	2009	—	Ego Wrappin' and the Gossip of Jaxx
"We Are Here" (Brahman+Ego-Wrappin')	2010	31	Sure Shot
"Hakobune" (方舟; "Ark")	2010	—	Naimono Nedari no Deadheat
"Mekon no Tsuki" (女根の月; "Feminine Faculty Moon")	2013	96	Steal a Person's Heart
"Suichū no Hikari" (水中の光; "Light Through Water")	2013	— (Note: "Suichū no Hikari" charted at number 57 on the Adult Contemporary Airplay chart.)	Steal a Person's Heart
"Neon Sign Stomp"	2014	34	Bright Time / Route 20 Hit the Road
"Ihōjin" (異邦人; "Foreigner")	2016	—	Route 20 Hit the Road
"That's What I Need" (Note: "That's What I Need" was originally released on Calling Me (1996), and compiled on a special release of Route 20 Hit the Road (2016). It was later released digitally in the same year, due to its use as the drama Kichijōji Dake ga Sumitai Machi desu ka (2016)'s theme song.)	2016	— (Note: "That's What I Need" charted at number 62 on the Radio Songs chart.)	Non-album single
"—" denotes items that were ineligible to chart on Oricon singles chart, or items that did not chart.

== Video albums ==
List of media, with selected chart positions
Title	Album details	Peak positions	
Title	Album details	JPN DVD	JPN Blu-ray
Midnight Dejavu at Tokyo Cinema Club	Released: March 29, 2006; Label: Toy's Factory; Formats: DVD	36	—
Midnight Dejavu Special: 2006.12.13 at NHK Hall	Released: December 13, 2007; Label: Toy's Factory; Formats: DVD	58	—
Brahman/Ego-Wrappin' Special Live Sure Shot	Released: October 27, 2010; Label: Toy's Factory; Formats: DVD	36	—
Midnight Dejavu 10th Anniversary at Tokyo Cinema Club	Released: April 27, 2011; Label: Toy's Factory; Formats: DVD	55	—
Route 20 Hit the Budokan: Live at Nippon Budokan	Released: March 15, 2017; Label: Toy's Factory; Formats: DVD, Blu-ray	34	23
"—" denotes items that were not released in Blu-Ray format.

== Guest appearances ==
List of non-single guest appearances with other performing artists
Title	Year	Other artist(s)	Album
"Disney Girls"	1998		Kirakira Hikaru Soundtrack
"Theme 2 Noraneko no Theme" (THEME 2 野良猫のテーマ; "Stray Cat theme")	2001	Kazufumi Kodama meets Ego-Wrappin'	Pistol Opera
"Suzhou Yakuoku" (蘇州夜曲; "Suzhou Nocturne")	2009	Ego-Wrappin' with Little Tempo	Little Tempo Shuku Jūgoshū Kinen Manatsu no Waiwai Matsuri Special Hibiya Yagai Dai Ongakudō Live
"African Lullaby"	2009	Ego-Wrappin' with Little Tempo	Little Tempo Shuku Jūgoshū Kinen Manatsu no Waiwai Matsuri Special Hibiya Yagai Dai Ongakudō Live
"Lupin Sansei Ai no Theme" (ルパン三世・愛のテーマ; "Lupin the Third Love Theme")	2010	Ego-Wrappin' and the Gossip of Jaxx	Club Jazz Digs Lupin the Third
