= Oldboy (2013 film) =

American film by Spike Lee

- Theatrical release poster
- Directed by: Spike Lee
- Screenplay by: Mark Protosevich
- Based on: Oldboy (Note: Misspelled as Old Boy in the opening credits. Additionally, the South Korean film is based on the Japanese manga Old Boy by Garon Tsuchiya and Nobuaki Minegishi.) by: Hwang Jo-yun; Lim Jun-hyung; Park Chan-wook
- Produced by: Roy Lee; Doug Davison; Nathan Kahane
- Starring: Josh Brolin; Elizabeth Olsen; Sharlto Copley
- Cinematography: Sean Bobbitt
- Edited by: Barry Alexander Brown
- Music by: Roque Baños
- Production companies: Good Universe; Vertigo Entertainment; 40 Acres and a Mule Filmworks
- Distributed by: FilmDistrict
- Release date: November 27, 2013
- Running time: 104 minutes
- Country: United States
- Language: English
- Budget: $30 million
- Box office: $5.2 million

Oldboy is a 2013 American neo-noir action thriller film directed by Spike Lee, written by Mark Protosevich, and starring Josh Brolin, Elizabeth Olsen, and Sharlto Copley. It is a remake of the 2003 South Korean film of the same name, which itself is loosely based on the Japanese manga of the same name. It follows a man (Brolin) who searches for his captors after being mysteriously imprisoned for twenty years.

Oldboy was released theatrically in the United States on November 27, 2013, by FilmDistrict. It received negative reviews, with many critics deeming it inferior to the original, and was a box-office bomb.

== Plot ==
In 1993, alcoholic advertising executive Joe Doucett gets drunk after losing a major account. Before he passes out, he sees a woman with a yellow umbrella. When he awakes, he finds himself locked within a hotel room. His unseen captors provide him with food, alcohol and hygiene items, but do not explain why he is captive. He sees a news report that says his ex-wife Donna was raped and murdered and that he is the prime suspect, and that their infant daughter Mia was adopted.

Over the next 20 years, he quits drinking and works himself into shape, intent on escaping and getting revenge. He compiles a list of all those who would want to imprison him, and writes letters to eventually give to Mia. One day he sees an interview with Mia, who says she would forgive her father if she ever saw him.

Joe is drugged shortly thereafter, and wakes to find himself outside with a cell phone and several thousand dollars. He sees the woman with the yellow umbrella and gives chase, but ends up running into Marie Sebastian, a nurse who offers to help him. He refuses but takes her business card. He goes to his bar-owner friend Chucky, and explains what has transpired. While there, Joe gets a call on the cell phone from a man calling himself the Stranger, mocking him. Joe spends a great deal of time to determine if any of the men on his list are the Stranger, but they all prove to be innocent. He collapses from dehydration, and Chucky calls Marie to help. While Joe recovers, Marie is taken emotionally by Joe's letters to Mia, and offers to help him further. She helps him identify the Chinese restaurant where some of his food came from while he was imprisoned.

Joe follows a delivery from the restaurant to the warehouse where he was imprisoned, and meets Chaney, its owner, whom Joe tortures into confessing that the Stranger arranged for his imprisonment. On his return to Chucky's bar, Joe finds the Stranger there with the woman with the yellow umbrella, his bodyguard Haeng-Bok. The Stranger tells Joe they have kidnapped Mia. He says that if Joe can determine the Stranger's identity within 46 hours, he'll free Mia, give Joe $20 million in diamonds and proof of his innocence in Donna's murder, and that he will commit suicide.

Joe learns that Chaney and his men are seeking revenge by attacking Marie, and he races there, only to be captured by Chaney. Just as Chaney is about to beat him savagely, the Stranger calls Chaney, and tells him a large sum of cash has just been left on the doorstep in exchange for Joe's release. They let Joe go.

Marie identifies the Stranger's ringtone as the anthem of Evergreen Academy, where Joe attended. They learn that many years prior, the school was bought by an anonymous corporation and closed. They break into its office and look through yearbooks. Joe recognizes one student, Adrian Doyle Pryce, and recalls tormenting his sister, Amanda, for her promiscuity, which led to the revelation that their father, Arthur, had incestuous relations with them both. As a result, Arthur moved them to Luxembourg, but later killed his family and himself in a murder-suicide; Adrian was the only survivor.

Joe calls Chucky with the name, and Chucky confirms Joe's guess that the Stranger is Adrian. However, when Chucky insults Amanda, Adrian, who is listening on a cloned cell phone, kills him before Joe can arrive. Joe hides Marie in a hotel for her safety, where they have sex, unaware Adrian is watching them through hidden cameras.

Joe goes to Adrian's penthouse, defeats and kills Haeng-Bok, and confronts Adrian. Adrian congratulates him, giving him the diamonds and escorting him to where Mia is. However, Adrian asks Joe to think why he had let Joe go in the first place, and shows that the interview with Mia was all a set-up, and "Mia" was a paid actress. Adrian shows Joe that Marie is really his daughter and that he had engineered events to this point to make Joe feel what it is like to lose everything. Adrian then fulfills his promise and commits suicide. Horrified, Joe writes Marie a letter saying they can never see each other again, and leaves her most of the diamonds, using the rest to pay Chaney to return him to the captivity of the hotel room.

== Cast ==
- Josh Brolin as Joe Doucett
  - Grey Damon as Young Joe Doucett
- Elizabeth Olsen as Marie Sebastian
- Sharlto Copley as Adrian Doyle Pryce ('The Stranger')
  - Erik Gersovitz as Young Adrian Doyle Pryce
- Samuel L. Jackson as Chaney
- Michael Imperioli as Chucky
  - Brett Lapeyrouse as Young Chucky
- James Ransone as Dr. Tom Melby
- Max Casella as James Prestley
- Linda Emond as Edwina Burke
- Pom Klementieff as Haeng-bok
- Elvis Nolasco as Cortez
- Lance Reddick as Daniel Newcombe
- Hannah Ware as Donna Hawthorne
- Richard Portnow as Bernie Sharkey
- Hannah Simone as Stephanie Lee
- Rami Malek as Browning
- Ciera Payton as Capri
- Elvy Yost as "Mia Doucett"
- Lizzy DeClement as Amanda Pryce
- Caitlin Dulany as Emma Pryce
- Steven Hauck as Arthur Pryce
- Cinqué Lee as Bellhop

== Production ==
=== Early development ===
An American remake of Oldboy (2003) previously had director Justin Lin attached, with Ernesto M. Foronda and Fabian Marquez writing the screenplay after previously collaborating with Lin on Better Luck Tomorrow (2002). In November 2008, DreamWorks Pictures and Universal Pictures were securing the rights to the remake, producing and distributing respectively, which Will Smith had expressed interest in starring, with Steven Spielberg as director. Mark Protosevich was in talks to write the script, although the acquisition to the remake rights were not finalized. Smith later clarified that Spielberg would not be remaking the film, instead adapting the Old Boy manga itself, which is considerably different from the original film. In June 2009, the manga's publisher launched a lawsuit against the Korean film's producers for giving the film rights to Spielberg without their permission. Later in November 2009, it was reported that DreamWorks, Spielberg, and Smith had stepped back from the project. The producing team announced in November 2009 that the project was dead.

=== Director and casting ===
On July 11, 2011, Mandate Pictures sent a press release stating that Spike Lee would direct a remake of the South Korean film (ignoring the earlier version's adaptation of the manga) with a screenplay written by Protosevich. Josh Brolin was cast to star in the remake as the lead character, while Christian Bale was reportedly in talks to portray the antagonist character, but it was later reported that Colin Firth had been offered the role. Firth later passed on the role, which was later offered to Clive Owen. In May 2012, Deadline Hollywood reported that Sharlto Copley had officially been cast as the villain Adrian Pryce. Elizabeth Olsen, Samuel L. Jackson and Nate Parker were all later announced to have joined the cast. Parker was later replaced by James Ransone, due to a scheduling conflict. The film marked Jackson's first time working with director Lee since 1991's Jungle Fever.

Principal photography began in October 2012.

=== Final cut editing ===
Spike Lee's version was 140 minutes long, but the producers heavily re-edited the film to 105 minutes (re-edits by producers also included the "one-shot hammer" scene); Lee and Josh Brolin were unhappy with it. Lee even removed his trademark "A Spike Lee Joint" credit for a more impersonal "A Spike Lee Film" during the editing process. Brolin has also said in an interview with the Los Angeles Times that he prefers Lee's version of the film, though it is not clear if this cut will ever be released. Later he said: "I thought Spike's cut was actually way better than the studio's, but the studio took it away and I thought they'd cut it very poorly and I thought it ended up having the opposite effect. That's what happens when you start cutting to this idea of pandering for an audience, and how testing can bite you in the ass. You don't know what the audience is going to want."

== Release ==
=== Theatrical ===
Oldboy was released theatrically in the United States on November 23, 2013, by FilmDistrict. It was the last film to be distributed by the company, before Focus Features absorbed the company in October 2013.

The film grossed $885,000 in its first five days, one of the weakest Thanksgiving openings of all time, according to Variety. It opened in 18th place at the box office and finished with a worldwide gross of $5.2 million.

=== Home media ===
The film was released in the United States on DVD and Blu-ray on March 4, 2014, by Sony Pictures Home Entertainment.

=== Critical reception ===
Oldboy received negative reviews from critics. IndieWire reported that the film garnered a "C-" rating on the A+ to F scale as evaluated by critics, who stated that it "doesn't measure up" to the original film. On Rotten Tomatoes, 39% of 152 reviews are positive, with an average rating of 5.1/10. The website's critical consensus reads, "Suitably grim and bloody yet disappointingly safe and shallow, Spike Lee's Oldboy remake neither surpasses the original nor adds anything new to its impressive legacy." On Metacritic, the film has a weighted average score of 49 out of 100, based on 41 critics, indicating "mixed or average reviews".

Justin Chang of Variety said that "Lee and Protosevich have made a picture that, although several shades edgier than the average Hollywood thriller, feels content to shadow its predecessor's every move while falling short of its unhinged, balls-out delirium." Michael Phillips of The Chicago Tribune, in a one and a half star review noted that "The revenge in Oldboy is neither sweet nor sour; it's just drab".

In a more positive review, Matt Zoller Seitz of RogerEbert.com gives three of four stars, saying: "Because the Internet moves with the speed and ferocity of a hornet swarm, there's a chance that by the time you read this, Spike Lee's American remake of Oldboy will already have been stung to death. If so, too bad. This American version of Park Chan-Wook's Korean thriller is Lee's most exciting movie since Inside Man—not a masterpiece by any stretch, but a lively commercial genre picture with a hypnotic, obsessive quality, and an utter indifference to being liked, much less approved of."

Eric Kohn, in a largely positive review at IndieWire said: "It's been so long since Lee made such a thoroughly amusing work that fans should have no problem excusing its messiness. But make no mistake... Oldboy is all over the place, sometimes playing like a subdued melodrama and elsewhere erupting into flamboyance and gore."

== See also ==
- The Count of Monte Cristo, an 1844 novel with a similar premise, referenced briefly in the film.
