= Zinda (film) =

2006 Indian film by Sanjay Gupta

- Theatrical release poster
- Directed by: Sanjay Gupta
- Screenplay by: Sanjay Gupta; Suresh Nair
- Produced by: Sanjay Gupta
- Starring: Sanjay Dutt; John Abraham; Lara Dutta; Celina Jaitly
- Cinematography: Sanjay F. Gupta
- Edited by: Bunty Nagi
- Music by: Songs: Vishal–Shekhar; Nikhil Chinapa; Dj Nawed; Kinky Ronald; Strings; Background Score: Sanjoy Chowdhury
- Release date: 13 January 2006
- Running time: 116 minutes
- Country: India
- Language: Hindi

Zinda (English: Alive) is a 2006 Indian Hindi-language neo-noir action thriller film written and directed by Sanjay Gupta, who co-wrote the film with Suresh Nair. It stars Sanjay Dutt, John Abraham, Lara Dutta and Celina Jaitly. Vishal–Shekhar composed the film's thematic music, while the background score was composed by Sanjoy Chowdhury. Dutt suggested the script to Gupta post the release of their previous film Musafir, following which the film went into production. Set in Thailand, the plot centers on Balajeet "Bala" Roy, who gets kidnapped and held hostage in a cell. After getting released without any explanation, Bala sets out to find his captor and the reason behind his captivity.

Zinda was released on 13 January 2006, and has been identified as an unauthorized adaptation of the South Korean film Oldboy, which itself is an official adaptation of the Japanese manga of the same name. Show East, the producers of Oldboy, who had already sold the remake rights to DreamWorks in 2004 had initially expressed legal concerns, but no legal action was taken as the studio had shut down. The film was a box-office flop, grossing ₹17.6 crore worldwide against a budget of ₹13 crore.

== Plot ==
Software engineer Balajeet "Bala" Roy, is happily married to Nisha Roy. But before Nisha can inform him that she is pregnant with their child, Bala is captured by unseen assailants and imprisoned in a cell. After one year, Bala finds out that Nisha was brutally murdered. Bala is kept in total isolation for 14 years without knowing who imprisoned him and why. While in captivity, he learns martial arts from television, with the intention of using it against the people who captured him. He is finally released, again without explanation, and sets out attempts for revenge.

He befriends a Bangkok taxi driver named Jenny, who helps him track his kidnappers. Bala tracks down the restaurant that served him food during his entire captivity and follows a delivery moped to his captors. He discovers that he was held in a private prison where people can pay to have others incarcerated. Bala tortures the owner Wong Foo for answers by pulling out his teeth with a claw hammer; he then finds out he was imprisoned for "talking too much", and fights his way out of the building. He is injured during the fight, but a mysterious hooded man saves him and takes him to a taxi, the hooded man turns out to be Rohit Chopra. Soon Wong Foo kidnaps Jenny and tortures her. He threatens to remove Bala's teeth with his own claw hammer but is interrupted by Rohit. Bala takes refuge with Jenny, and they have sex. Bala is informed that his daughter is alive. Bala's friend Joy is killed, and he learns that his kidnapper is none other than Rohit.

Rohit reveals his reason for kidnapping Bala. They went to high school together, where Bala had lusted after Rohit's elder sister Reema. After Reema rejected him, Bala spread a rumour that she was promiscuous. She became the laughing stock of their school and committed suicide by setting herself on fire. Rohit blamed Bala for her death and engineered his imprisonment as revenge. Rohit tells Bala that he killed Nisha, and sent his daughter, who is actually now 14, to a brothel. Bala beats Rohit up and shoves him off a balcony, but grabs his hand and pleads with him to tell him where his daughter is. Defiantly, Rohit lets go of Bala's hands and stabbed falls to his death. Bala then kills Rohit's goons and Wong Foo.

In the end, Bala learns that his daughter is safe; and Rohit had lied to him about selling her to a brothel to torment him. He finds her sitting on a riverbank, and goes to meet her. He then happily lives with his daughter.

== Cast ==
- Sanjay Dutt as Balajeet "Bala" Roy
- John Abraham as Rohit Chopra
- Celina Jaitly as Nisha Roy
- Mahesh Manjrekar as Joy Fernandes
- Lara Dutta as Jenny Singh
- Rajendranath Zutshi as Woo Fong (as Raj Zutshi)
- Alisha Baig as Reema Chopra

== Reception ==
=== Critical reception ===
Derek Elley from Variety praised the performances and noted that the film was very dark and violent by Bollywood standards, diverged from the Korean original in several instances, and its desaturated colors gave it a relentlessly bleak look. Subhash K. Jha gave it 2.5/5 and stated that "the film belongs to Sanjay Dutt.... If the adventure-action genre in Hindi cinema needed a wake-up call, this is it". Taran Adarsh from Bollywood Hungama gave the film 2 stars out of 5, finding it "too dark and gruesome for an average Indian moviegoer to stomach." Jaspreet Pandohar from BBC compared it unfavourably to Oldboy and felt that Gupta's attempt to make the film more palatable for Indian audiences by omitting or replacing comically gruesome incidents from the original left behind a "bleak vendetta flick with a pointless Thai backdrop." Sukanya Verma from Rediff.com also noted that the film was "pretty much an identical twin of Oldboy" but went on to praise Dutt's performance, the cinematography and editing.

=== Awards ===
52nd Filmfare Awards:
Nomination
Best Villain – John Abraham

== Soundtrack ==
Zinda

Soundtrack album by Vishal–Shekhar
- Released: 9 December 2005
- Genre: Feature film soundtrack
- Label: T-Series

The songs were composed by duo Vishal–Shekhar and released by T-Series.

- "Ye Hai Meri Kahani" – Strings, Shehzad Roy and Atif Aslam
- "Zinda Hoon Main" – Shibani Kashyap
- "Har Saans" – Krishna Beura & Abrar-ul-Haq
- "Kya Main Zinda Hoon" – Krishna Beura
- "Maula" – Vinod Rathod and Zoheb Hassan
- "Zinda Hoon Main Y" – Shibani Kashyap
- "Chal Rahi Hai Saanse" – Kailash Kher and Jawad Ahmad
- "Har Saans (Black Mamba Mix)" – Krishna Beura and 21 Pilots w / Palash Sen and Sudesh Bhosle
- "Ye Hai Meri Kahani (K Rap Mix)" – Strings & Jamie xx
- "Kabhi Muskura ke" – Sanjay Dutt

== Similarities with Oldboy ==
At a November 2005 press conference, representatives of Show East, the production company that released Oldboy, expressed concern Zinda was similar to their film, and said they were investigating the similarities. They noted that at the time, they did not have the final version of Zinda available to compare Oldboy with. They stated that if they found there was "strong similarity between the two [films]", they would be contacting their lawyers."

The Hindu reviewer Sudhish Kamath in his review of Zinda, found the two films to be very similar in terms of plot, as well as in the depiction of specific scenes. Rediff.com reviewer Raja Sen wrote an open letter to Gupta, declaring he would not watch the film due to the plagiarism, and further revealed Gupta plagiarized the whole film in spite of categorically telling him he had lifted one scene from Oldboy and claiming the rest was original. Rajeev Masand labeled it a "shameless rip-off" of Oldboy where Gupta "steals not only the plot and characters but entire sequences, and pretty much the whole treatment of the original film." CNN-News18 refused to term it a remake since no rights were officially purchased, and went on to criticize its performances, storytelling and the blue tint. The website pointed out that while the film could be notable to the Indian audience for its experimental storyline around that time, this has not been the case over the years.

Gupta continued to deny any of this when questioned during an interview. He later claimed it was not entirely inspired by Oldboy, and mentioned how the latter was also inspired by The Count of Monte Cristo instead.
