= Aoyama, Tokyo =

Neighborhood of Tokyo, Japan

Coordinates: 35.672°N 139.723°E

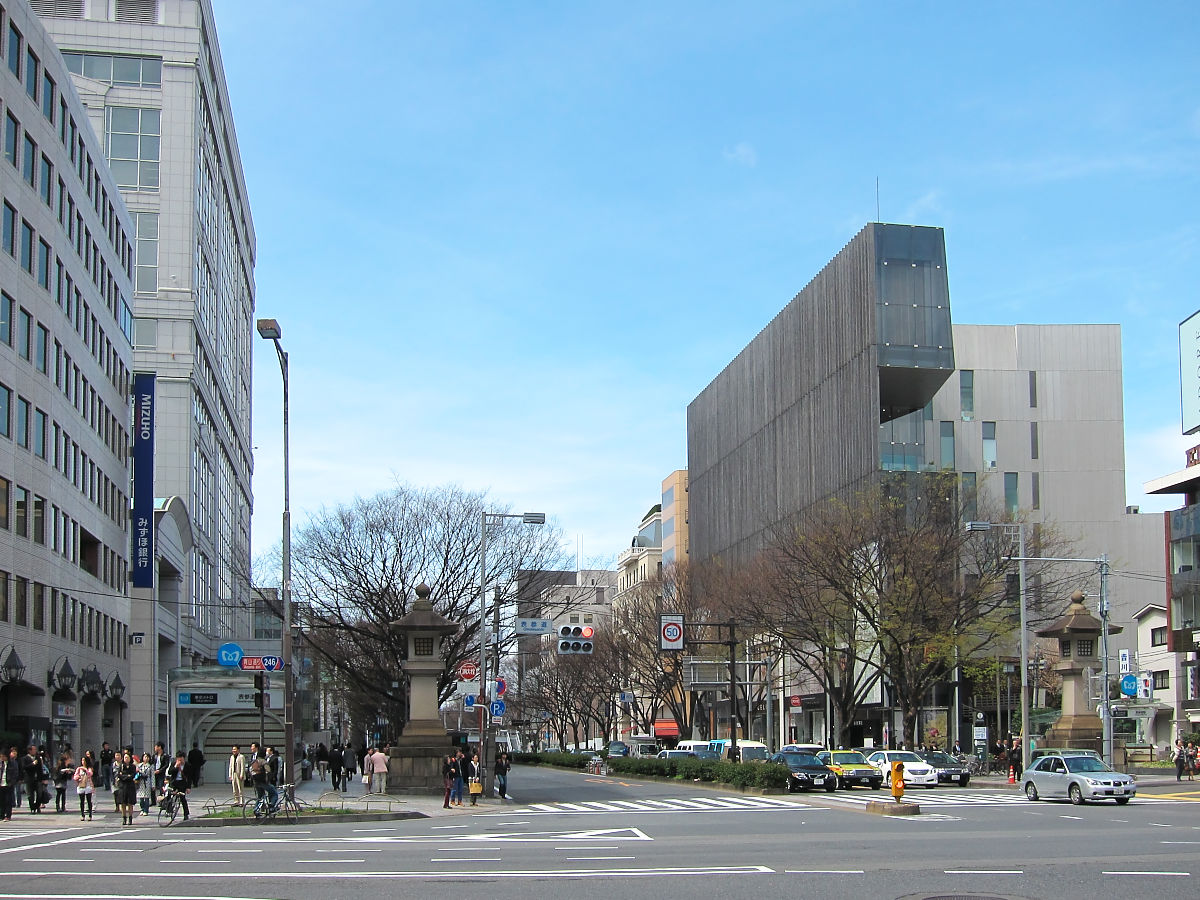
Omotesando intersection on Aoyama-dori

Aoyama (青山) is a neighborhood in Tokyo, located in the northwest portion of Minato Ward. The area is known for its international fashion houses, cafes and restaurants.

Kita-Aoyama (北青山; "North Aoyama") refers to the area on the north side of Aoyama-dori (Aoyama Street) between the Akasaka Palace and Aoyama Gakuin University, while Minami-Aoyama (南青山; "South Aoyama") refers to the area to the south of Aoyama-dori and extends to the northern edge of Roppongi, Azabu and Hiroo.

During the Edo period, Aoyama was home to various temples, shrines, and samurai residences. The name Aoyama is derived from a samurai named Aoyama Tadanari who served the Tokugawa shogunate and held his mansion in the area. Today, along with Shibuya and Harajuku, Omotesandō is one of the most popular entertainment and shopping areas for young people in Tokyo. It is well known for its fashion houses, restaurants, and shopping. Chichibunomiya Rugby Stadium is located in the north part of Aoyama.

== Places in Aoyama ==
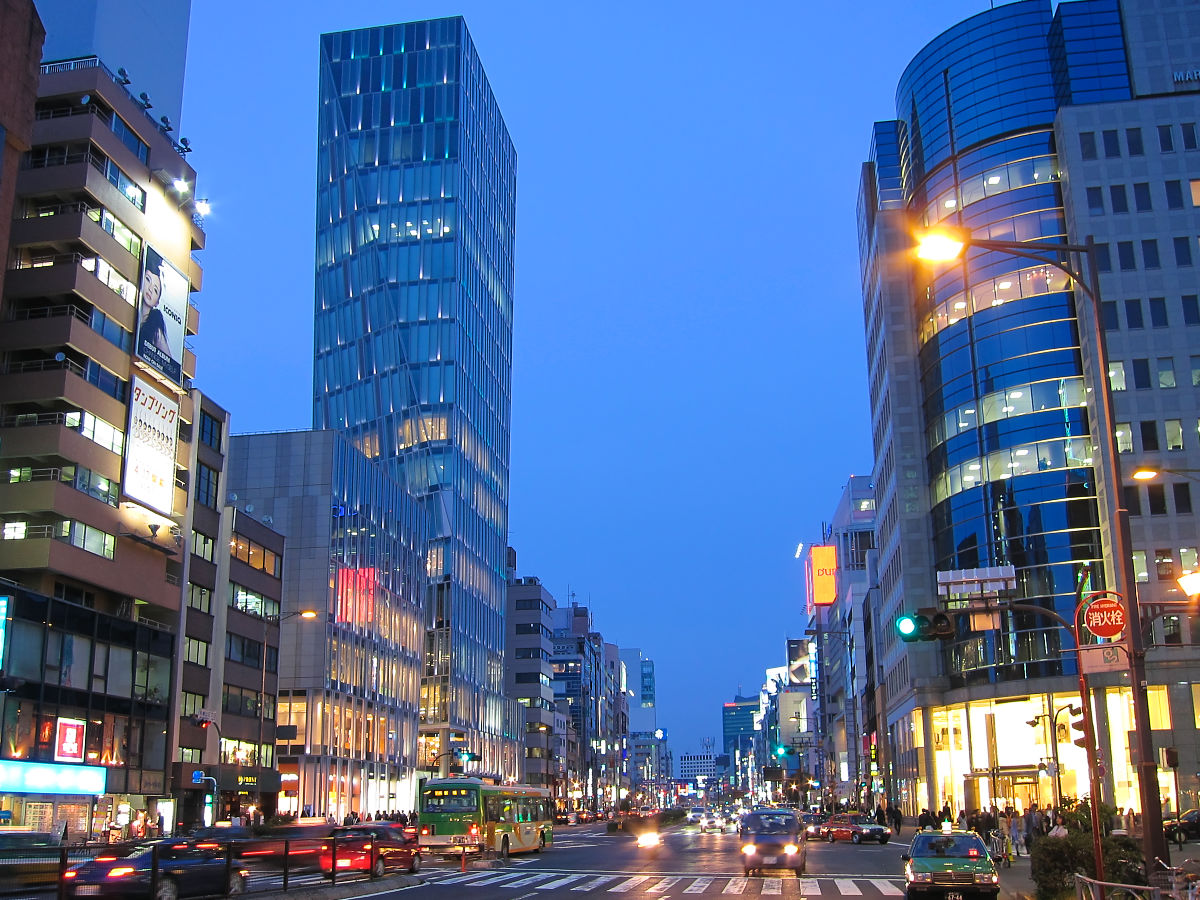
5 Minami-Aoyama intersection, on Aoyama-dori

- Aoyama Cemetery
- Aoyama Elementary School (public school)
- Aoyama Junior High School (public school)
- Blue Note Tokyo
- Chichibunomiya Rugby Stadium
- Clarence International School (preschool)
- Meiji Shrine Outer Gardens (明治神宮外苑, Meiji Jingu Gaien)
- Nezu Museum
- Seinan Elementary School (public school)
- Spiral
- Xbox 360 Lounge
- Zenkō-ji Aoyama-Betsuin, a branch temple of the Shinano Zenkō-ji located on Omotesandō and managed by the Jōdo-shū branch of Pure Land Buddhism

== Companies and organizations based in Aoyama ==
- Acne Studios
- Avex Group
- Berlitz (Asia Headquarters)
- Comme des Garçons
- Embassy of Brazil in Tokyo
- Embassy of Canada to Japan
- Embassy of Morocco in Tokyo
- Hip Land Music Corp.
- Honda Motor
- Italian Trade Commission Tokyo Office
- Italian State Tourist Board Tokyo Office
- Itochu
- JCB
- Nikka Whisky Distilling
- Oracle Corporation Japan
- RIAJ
- Sony Financial Holdings
  - Sony Life Insurance
- Teikoku Databank
- Victor Entertainment

== Gallery ==
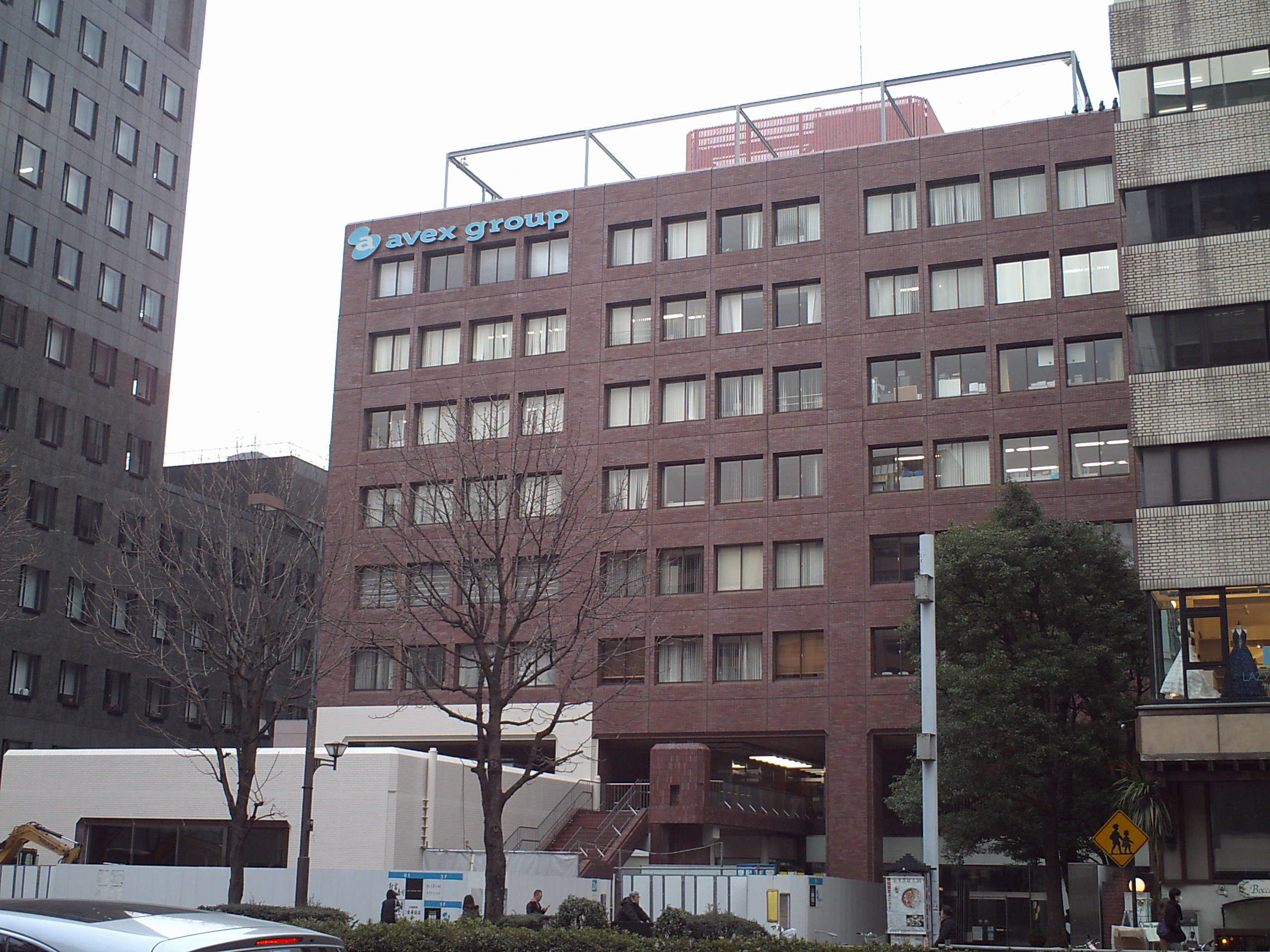
Avex Group's headquarters building before its renovation in 2016.

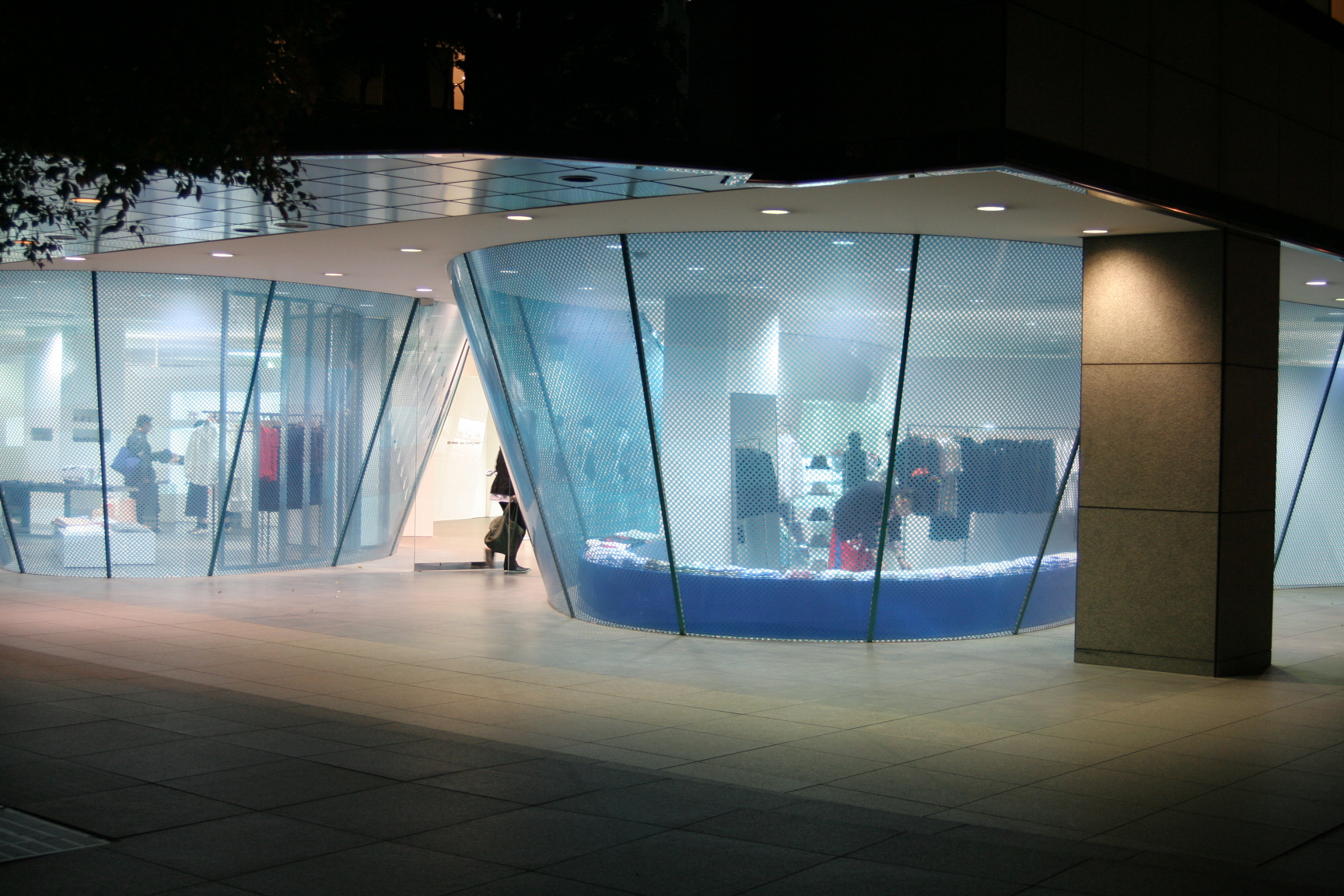
Comme des Garçons main branch in Minami-Aoyama.

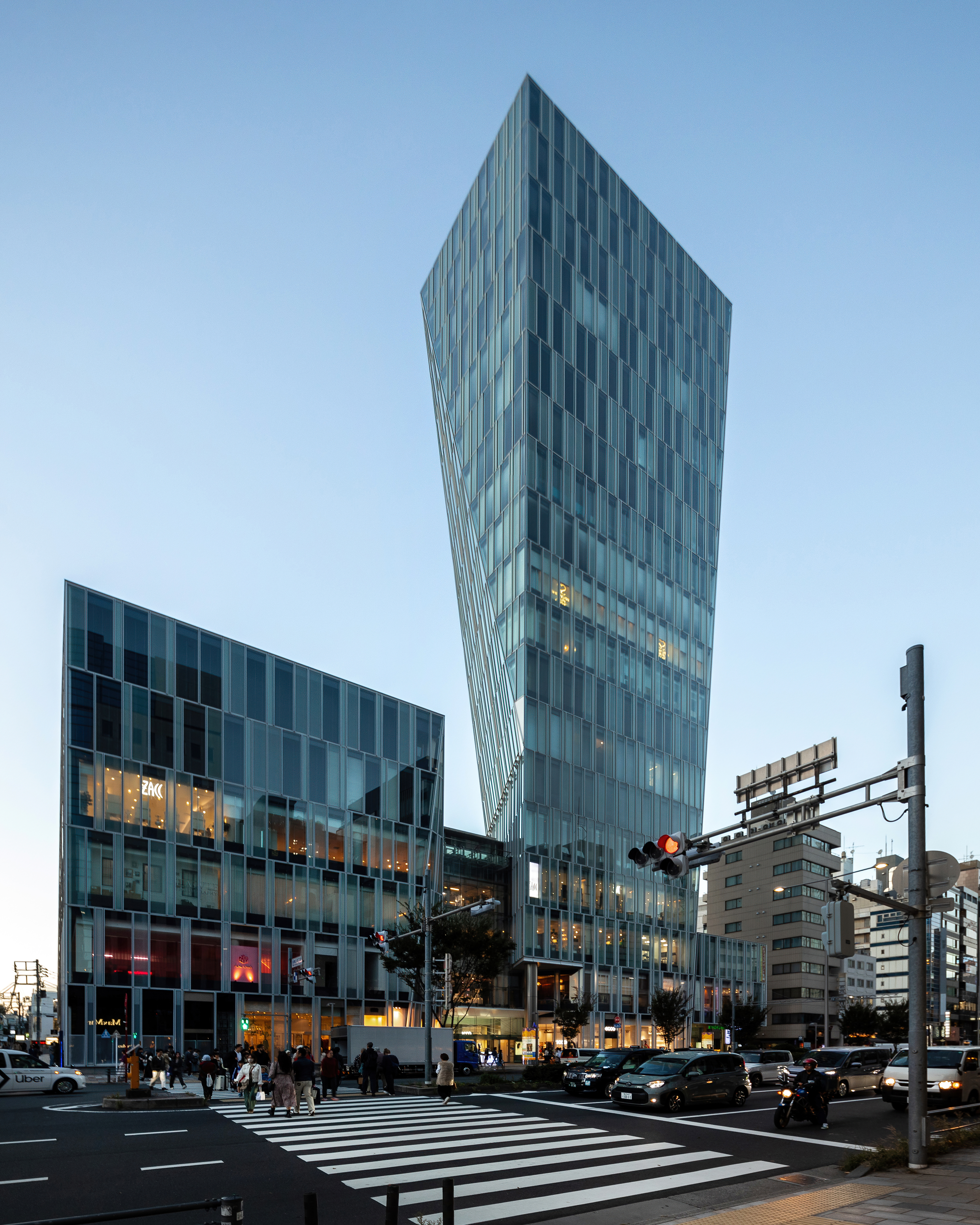
Ao building in Kita-Aoyama.

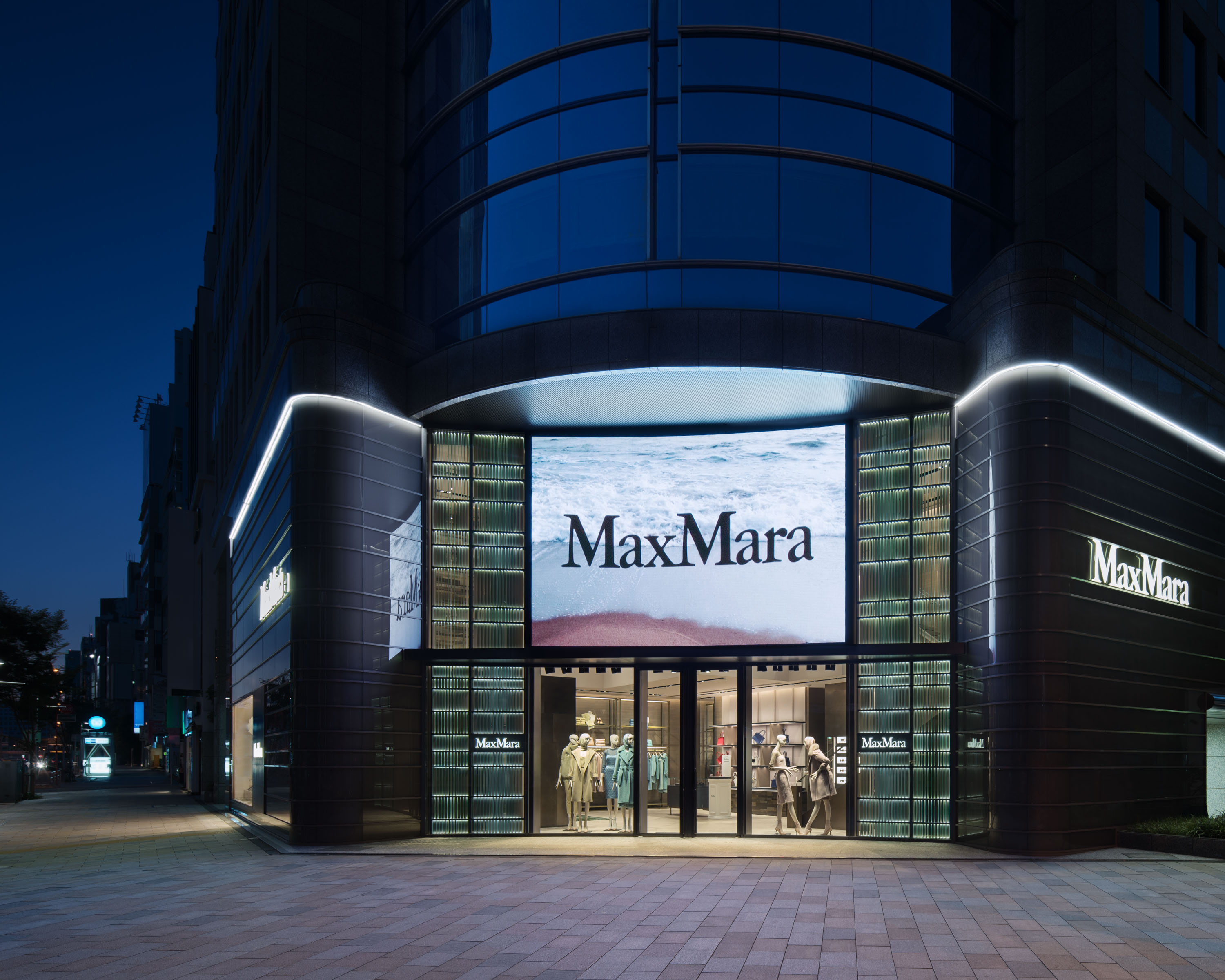
Max Mara boutique in 5 Minami-Aoyama

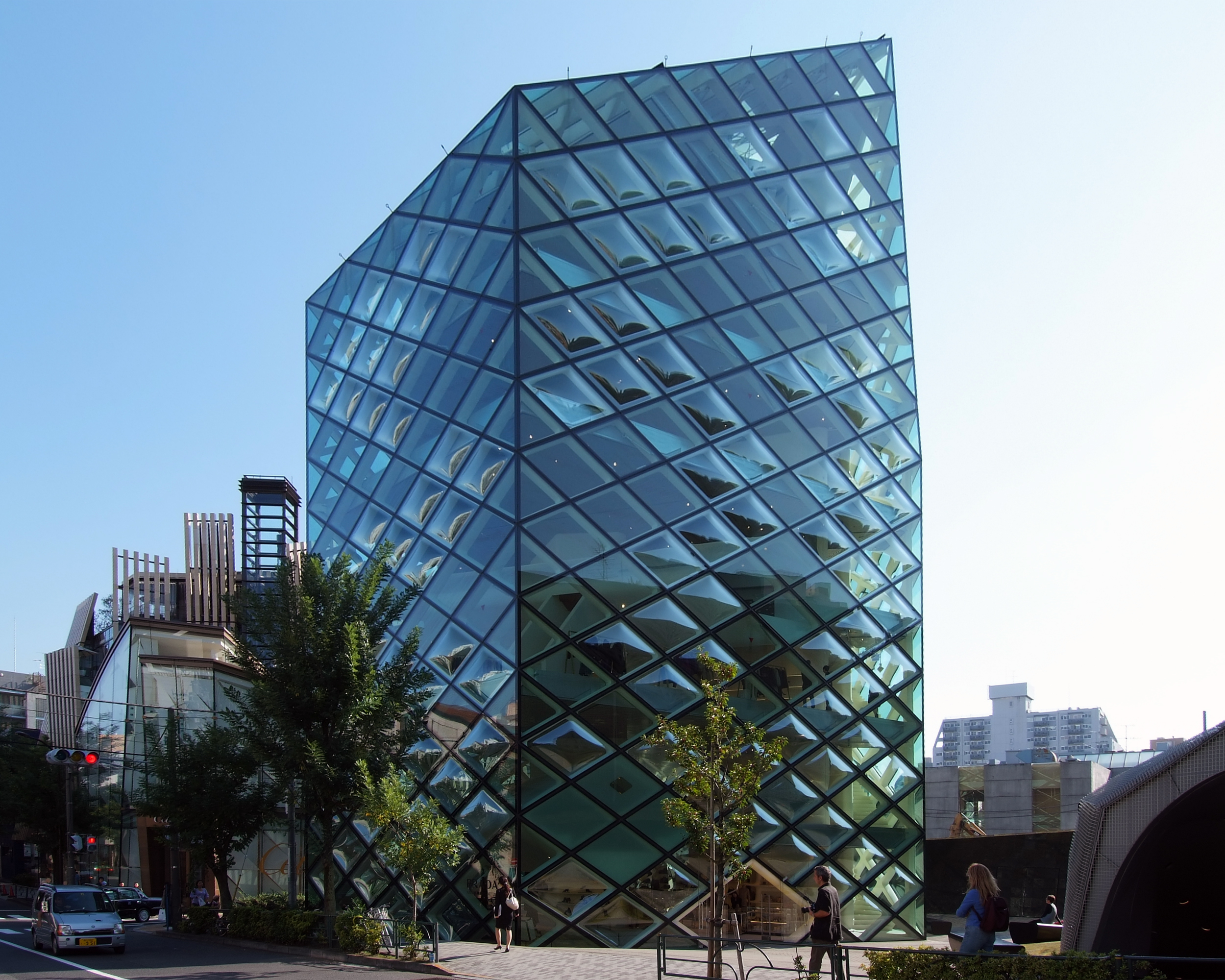
Prada boutique at Miyuki-dori in Minami-Aoyama.

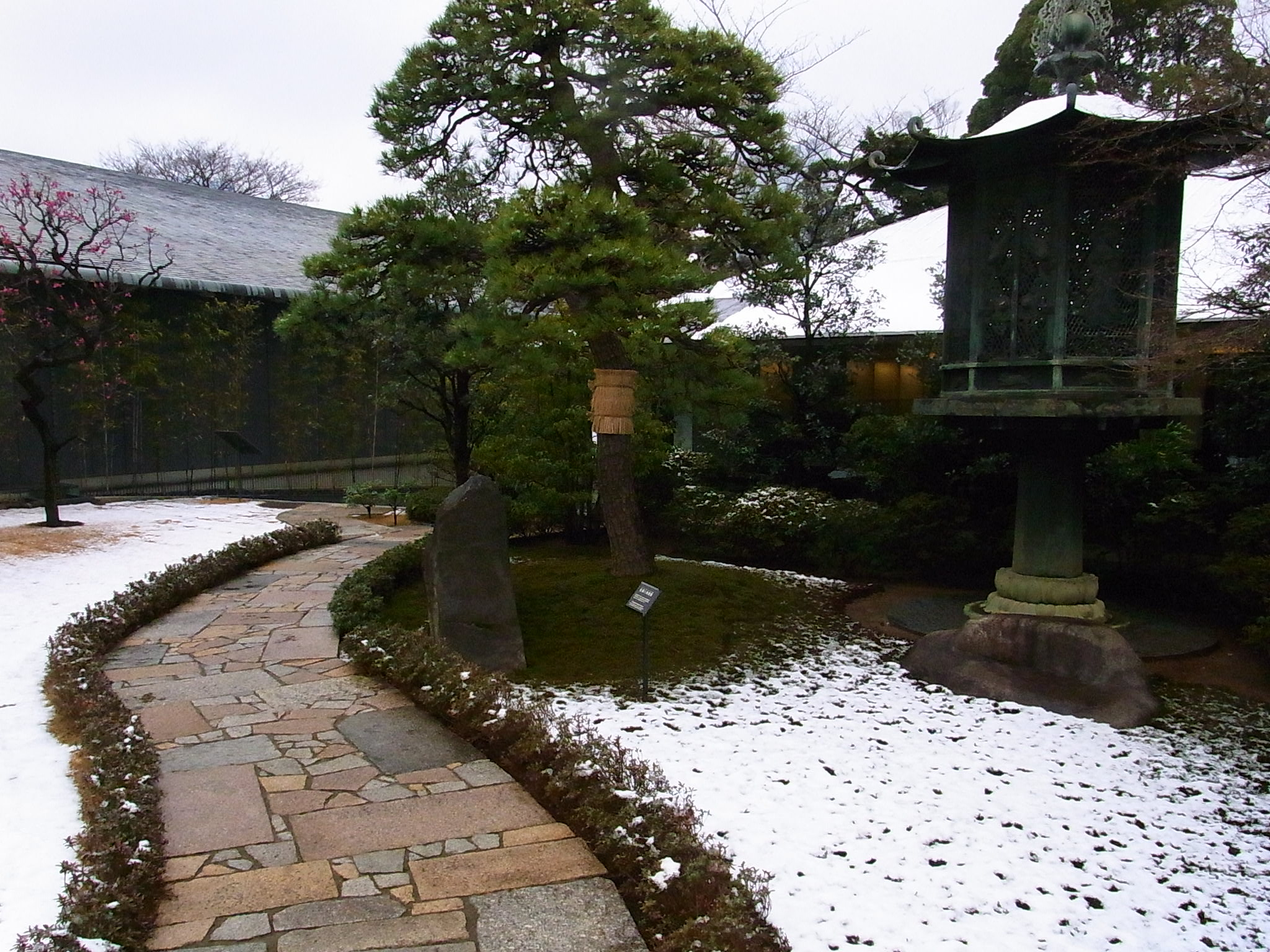
Nezu museum in Minami-Aoyama.

== Subway stations ==
- Aoyama-itchōme Station (Ginza Line, Hanzōmon Line, Toei Ōedo Line)
- Omotesandō Station (Chiyoda Line, Ginza Line, Hanzōmon Line)
- Gaiemmae Station (Ginza Line)
- Nogizaka Station (Chiyoda Line) – located in the southeastern corner of Minami-Aoyama adjacent to Roppongi and Akasaka

== Education ==
The Minato City Board of Education operates public elementary and junior high schools. Kita-Aoyama and Minami-Aoyama are zoned to different school districts.

== In popular culture ==
- A section of Aoyama-dori on which the Honda headquarters is located is part of the fictional Tokyo Route 246 street circuit in the Gran Turismo video game series.
- Shujin Academy, the school in which the protagonist Ren Amamiya and his friends attend in Persona 5, is located in Aoyama. The player can take a train to Aoyama-itchōme Station to arrive in Aoyama.
- A large plot point of the anime and manga series Death Note takes place in Aoyama.
