= Tadanari =

- Gender: Male

Origin
- Origin: Japanese
- Meaning: Different meanings depending on the kanji used

Tadanari (written: 忠成) is a masculine Japanese given name. Notable people with the name include:

- Aoyama Tadanari (青山 忠成) (1551–1613), Japanese daimyō
- Tadanari Lee (李 忠成) (born 1985), Japanese footballer
- Nishio Tadanari (西尾 忠成) (1653–1713), Japanese daimyō
- Tadanari Okamoto (岡本 忠成) (1932–1990), Japanese animator
