= Oldboy (2003 film) =

2003 South Korean film by Park Chan-wook

- Theatrical release poster
- Hangul: 올드보이
- RR: Oldeuboi
- MR: Oldŭboi
- Directed by: Park Chan-wook
- Screenplay by: Hwang Jo-yun; Lim Jun-hyung; Park Chan-wook
- Based on: Old Boy by: Garon Tsuchiya; Nobuaki Minegishi
- Produced by: Lim Seung-yong
- Starring: Choi Min-sik; Yoo Ji-tae; Kang Hye-jung
- Cinematography: Chung Chung-hoon
- Edited by: Kim Sang-bum
- Music by: Jo Yeong-wook
- Production companies: Egg Film; CJ Entertainment
- Distributed by: Show East
- Release dates: 21 November 2003 (South Korea); 25 March 2005 (North America)
- Running time: 120 minutes
- Country: South Korea
- Language: Korean
- Budget: $3 million
- Box office: $17.6 million

Oldboy (Korean: 올드보이) is a 2003 South Korean action thriller film directed and co-written by Park Chan-wook. A loose adaptation of the Japanese manga Old Boy by Garon Tsuchiya and Nobuaki Minegishi, the film follows Oh Dae-su (Choi Min-sik), who is imprisoned for 15 years without knowing the identity of his captor or his captor's motives. When he is released, Dae-su finds himself trapped in a web of conspiracy and violence as he seeks revenge against his captor and falls in love with a young sushi chef, Mi-do (Kang Hye-jung).

Oldboy attained critical acclaim and accolades worldwide, including winning the Grand Prix at the 2004 Cannes Film Festival, where it garnered high praise from Quentin Tarantino, the president of the jury. In the United States, film critic Roger Ebert stated that Oldboy is a "powerful film not because of what it depicts, but because of the depths of the human heart which it strips bare". The film's action sequences, particularly the single shot corridor fight sequence, also received commendation for their impressive execution.

The film's success led to two adaptations: an unauthorized Hindi remake in 2006 and an official American adaptation in 2013. As part of Park Chan-wook's The Vengeance Trilogy, it serves as the second installment, following Sympathy for Mr. Vengeance (2002) and preceding Lady Vengeance (2005).

The film is regarded as one of the greatest films of all time and has been included in numerous "best-of" lists by many publications. In 2008, Oldboy was placed 64th on an Empire list of the top 500 movies of all time. In 2020, The Guardian ranked it number three among the classics of modern South Korean cinema.

== Plot ==
In 1988, businessman Oh Dae-su is arrested for assault and drunkenness, consequently missing his daughter's fourth birthday. Shortly after being collected by his friend Joo-hwan, Dae-su is abducted. He awakens in a sealed room with a television, from which he learns that he has been framed for his wife's murder. Growing deranged from the solitude as years pass, Dae-su theorizes about the identity of his captor, trains himself in martial arts, creates a hole in the wall with chopsticks to attempt to escape through, and attempts suicide by slitting his wrists (after which he is resuscitated).

In 2003, Dae-su is sedated, hypnotized, and released. He encounters a suicidal man about to jump off a rooftop with his dog. Dae-su relays his story to the man, allowing him to jump upon finishing. Dae-su enters a sushi restaurant and collapses after receiving a call from his captor. The chef, Mi-do, takes him in.

Dae-su and Mi-do attempt to track down Dae-su's daughter, but relent after being informed that she has been adopted by a foreign family. After identifying the restaurant that prepared his prison meals and following a delivery driver, Dae-su locates his former prison, which he discovers is a private facility where people pay to have others incarcerated. He tortures and interrogates the warden, Park, who claims Dae-su was imprisoned for "talking too much." Dae-su escapes after fighting off Park's thugs.

Dae-su's captor, calling himself "Evergreen", sets up a meeting with Dae-su and promises to commit suicide by remotely deactivating his pacemaker if Dae-su uncovers his motive within five days; otherwise, Evergreen will kill Mi-do. Dae-su returns to Mi-do's apartment to find Park and his thugs molesting her. Park prepares to torture Dae-su, but stops when Evergreen sends a briefcase of cash. Dae-su threatens to cut off Park's hand before the latter leaves.

Dae-su and Mi-do gradually grow closer, eventually becoming sexually intimate. Dae-su awakens the following morning to find Park's severed hand in a box. Remembering his high school slogan, "Evergreen Old Boys", he identifies Evergreen as his former schoolmate Lee Woo-jin. He calls Joo-hwan, who recounts that his late classmate Lee Soo-ah—Woo-jin's sister—was a "slut"; an eavesdropping Woo-jin angrily stabs him to death.

After seeking out and consulting Soo-ah's friends, Dae-su recalls having seen Soo-ah and Woo-jin have sex in high school. Unaware that he was witnessing incest, Dae-su casually mentioned the incident to Joo-hwan, who subsequently spread gossip about Soo-ah's promiscuity, culminating in a rumor that she was pregnant and driving her to suicide.

Dae-su confronts Woo-jin at the latter's penthouse. He infers that Woo-jin killed Soo-ah, fearing the consequences of impregnating her, and shifted the blame to Dae-su to alleviate himself of the guilt. Woo-jin maintains that Soo-ah was merely experiencing phantom pregnancy as a result of the rumors. He then gives Dae-su a photo album, which reveals that Mi-do is Dae-su's daughter, and explains that he orchestrated Dae-su and Mi-do's meeting and relationship via hypnosis. A horrified Dae-su desperately pleads for forgiveness and begs Woo-jin not to tell Mi-do the truth; when Woo-jin is unmoved, Dae-su cuts out his own tongue as penance. Woo-jin finally agrees not to contact Mi-do and gives Dae-su the pacemaker remote. When Dae-su tries to use it, it only plays a recording of his tryst with Mi-do, making him collapse in despair. In the elevator, Woo-jin smiles smugly, but begins to hallucinate his sister's suicide. Realizing his vengeance has fixed nothing, a distraught Woo-jin fatally shoots himself in the head.

Dae-su locates the hypnotist and asks her to erase his knowledge of Mi-do being his daughter. Touched by a specific line in his letter—"Even though I'm no better than a beast, don't I have the right to live too?"—she guides him to envision the part of himself that knows the truth dying. Mi-do finds Dae-su lying alone in the snow and professes her love for him. The two embrace while Dae-su smiles, which soon turns into a tortured grimace.

== Cast ==
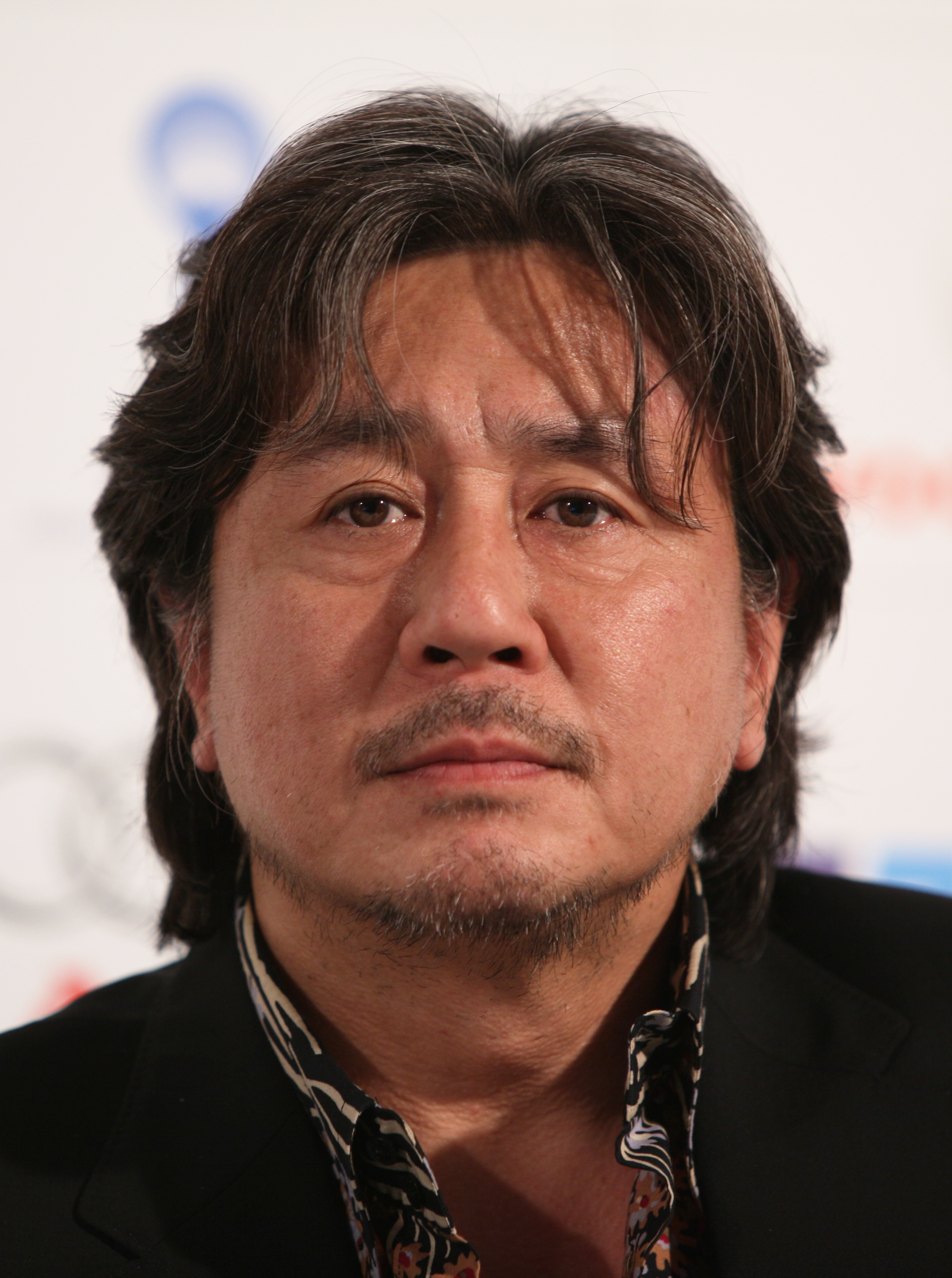
Choi Min-sik played the lead role in Oldboy as Oh Dae-su.

- Choi Min-sik as Oh Dae-su, a businessman who seeks revenge after being held in a mysterious prison for 15 years. Choi Min-sik lost and gained weight for his role depending on the filming schedule, trained for six weeks, and did most of his own stunt work.
  - Oh Tae-kyung as young Dae-su.
- Yoo Ji-tae as Lee Woo-jin, the man behind Oh Dae-su's imprisonment. Park Chan-wook's ideal choice for Woo-jin had been actor Han Suk-kyu, who previously played a rival to Choi Min-sik in Shiri and No. 3. Choi then suggested Yoo Ji-tae for the role, despite Park believing he was too young for the part.
  - Yoo Yeon-seok as young Woo-jin.
- Kang Hye-jung as Mi-do, Dae-su's love interest.
- Ji Dae-han as No Joo-hwan, Dae-su's friend and the owner of an internet café.
  - Woo Il-han as young Joo-hwan.
- Kim Byeong-ok as Mr. Han, Woo-jin's bodyguard.
- Yoon Jin-seo as Lee Soo-ah, Woo-jin's sister.
- Oh Dal-su as Mr. Park Cheol-woong, warden of the private prison.
- Oh Kwang-rok as Suicidal man.

== Production ==
The corridor fight scene took seventeen takes in three days to perfect and was one continuous take; there was no editing of any sort except for the knife stabbed in Oh Dae-su's back, which was computer-generated imagery.

The script originally called for full male frontal nudity, but Yoo Ji-tae changed his mind after the scenes had been shot.

Other computer-generated imagery in the film includes the ant coming out of Dae-su's arm and the ants crawling over him afterwards. The octopus being eaten alive was not computer-generated; four were used during the filming of this scene. The eating of squirming octopuses (called san-nakji (산낙지) in Korean) as a delicacy exists in East Asia, although it is usually killed and cut, not eaten whole and alive; the squirming is a result of postmortem nerve activity in the octopus' tentacles. When asked in DVD commentary if he felt sorry for Choi, director Park Chan-wook stated he felt more sorry for the octopuses.

The final scene's snowy landscape was filmed in New Zealand. The ending is deliberately ambiguous, and the audience is left with several questions: specifically, how much time has passed, if Dae-su's meeting with the hypnotist really took place, whether he successfully lost the knowledge of Mi-do's identity, and whether he will continue his relationship with Mi-do. In an interview with Park (included with the European release of the film), he says that the ambiguous ending was deliberate and intended to generate discussion; it is completely up to each individual viewer to interpret what is not shown.

== Soundtrack ==
Original Motion Picture Soundtrack from Oldboy

Soundtrack album by Jo Yeong-wook
- Released: 9 December 2003
- Recorded: 2003 Seoul
- Genre: Contemporary classical
- Length: 60:00
- Label: EMI Music Korea Ltd.
- Producers: Jo Yeong-wook; Shim Hyeon-jeong; Lee Ji-soo; Choi Seung-hyun

Nearly all the music cues that are composed by Shim Hyeon-jeong, Lee Ji-soo and Choi Seung-hyun are titled after films, many of them film noirs.

No.	Title	Length
1.	"Look Who's Talking" (opening song)	1:41
2.	"Somewhere in the Night"	1:29
3.	"The Count of Monte Cristo"	2:34
4.	"Jailhouse Rock"	1:57
5.	"In a Lonely Place" (Oh Dae-su's theme)	3:29
6.	"It's Alive"	2:36
7.	"The Searchers"	3:29
8.	"Look Back in Anger"	2:11
9.	""Vivaldi" – Four Seasons Concerto Concerto No. 4 in F minor, Op. 8, RV 297, "L'inverno" (Winter)"	3:03
10.	"Room at the Top"	1:36
11.	"Cries and Whispers" (Lee Woo-jin's theme)	3:32
12.	"Out of Sight"	1:00
13.	"For Whom the Bell Tolls"	2:45
14.	"Out of the Past"	1:25
15.	"Breathless" (Lee Woo-jin's theme [reprise])	4:21
16.	"The Old Boy" (Oh Dae-su's theme [reprise])	3:44
17.	"Dressed to Kill"	2:00
18.	"Frantic"	3:28
19.	"Cul-de-Sac"	1:32
20.	"Kiss Me Deadly"	3:57
21.	"Point Blank"	0:27
22.	"Farewell, My Lovely" (Lee Woo-jin's theme [reprise])	2:47
23.	"The Big Sleep"	1:34
24.	"The Last Waltz" (Mi-do's theme)	3:23
Total length:		60:00

== Reception and analysis ==
=== Box office ===
In South Korea, the film was seen by 3,260,000 filmgoers and ranks fifth for the highest-grossing film of 2003. In North America, the Film opened to a limited release on March 25, 2005, 2 years after it released in South Korea. It was shown in a maximum of 28 theaters.

Oldboy grossed a total of US$17,617,021 worldwide, of which US$14,980,005 came from its original release and the remainder from re-releases between 2006 and 2025.

=== 20th anniversary re-release ===
The film was theatrically re-released in the United States by Neon for its 20th anniversary on 16 August 2023, remastered in 4K, featuring bonus commentary by Park Chan-wook.

In 2025, the film was showcased in the section 'Decisive Moments in Asian Cinema' at the 30th Busan International Film Festival, as part of the special "Asian Cinema 100", being the signature work of the director Park Chan-wook.

=== Critical response ===
Oldboy received critical acclaim, and is considered an influential cult classic. Praise was also given to the film's action sequences, specifically highlighting the "all-timer" single shot hallway fight sequence. On the review aggregator website Rotten Tomatoes, the film has an approval rating of 82% based on 160 reviews. The site's critics consensus reads: "Violent and definitely not for the squeamish, Park Chan-Wook's visceral Oldboy is a strange, powerful tale of revenge." On Metacritic, the film has a weighted average score of 78 out of 100 based on 33 critics, indicating "generally favorable reviews".

Roger Ebert of the Chicago Sun-Times gave the film four out of four stars and remarked: "We are so accustomed to 'thrillers' that exist only as machines for creating diversion that it's a shock to find a movie in which the action, however violent, makes a statement and has a purpose." James Berardinelli of ReelViews gave the film three out of four stars, saying that it "isn't for everyone, but it offers a breath of fresh air to anyone gasping on the fumes of too many traditional Hollywood thrillers."

Stephanie Zacharek of Salon.com praised the film, calling it "anguished, beautiful, and desperately alive" and "a dazzling work of pop-culture artistry." Peter Bradshaw gave it 5 out of 5 stars, commenting that this is the first time in which he could actually identify with a small live octopus. Bradshaw summarizes his review by referring to Oldboy as "cinema that holds an edge of cold steel to your throat." David Dylan Thomas points out that rather than simply trying to "gross us out", Oldboy is "much more interested in playing with the conventions of the revenge fantasy and taking us on a very entertaining ride to places that, conceptually, we might not want to go." Sean Axmaker of the Seattle Post-Intelligencer gave Oldboy a score of "B−", calling it "a bloody and brutal revenge film immersed in madness and directed with operatic intensity," but felt that the questions raised by the film are "lost in the battering assault of lovingly crafted brutality."

Jamie Russell of the BBC movie review calls it a "sadistic masterpiece that confirms Korea's current status as producer of some of the world's most exciting cinema." In 2019 on The Hankyoreh, Kim Hyeong-seok said that Oldboy was the 'zeitgeist of the vigorous Korean cinema in early 2000s', and a 'boiling point that led history of Korean cinema to new state'. Manohla Dargis of the New York Times called the film "a trivial genre movie," writing, "The fact that Oldboy is embraced by some cinephiles is symptomatic of a bankrupt, reductive postmodernism: one that promotes a spurious aesthetic relativism (it's all good) and finds its crudest expression in the hermetically sealed world of fan boys." J.R. Jones of the Chicago Reader was also not impressed, saying that "there's a lot less here than meets the eye."

The film is regarded as one of the best films ever made and has been included in numerous "best-of" lists by many publications. In 2008, Oldboy was placed 64th on an Empire list of the top 500 movies of all time. The same year, voters on CNN named it one of the ten best Asian films ever made. It was ranked #18 in the same magazine's "The 100 Best Films of World Cinema" in 2010. In a 2016 BBC poll, critics voted the film the 30th greatest since 2000. In 2020, The Guardian ranked it number 3 among the classics of modern South Korean Cinema. In 2025, the film ranked number 43 on The New York Times' list of "The 100 Best Movies of the 21st Century" and number 40 on the "Readers' Choice" edition of the list.

=== Oedipus Rex inspiration ===
Park Chan-wook stated that he named the main character Oh Dae-su "to remind the viewer of Oedipus." In one of the film's iconic shots, Yoo Ji-tae, who played Woo-jin, strikes an extraordinary yoga pose. Park Chan-wook said he designed this pose to convey "the image of Apollo." It was Apollo's prophecy that revealed Oedipus' fate in the Sophocles play Oedipus Rex. The link to Oedipus Rex is only a minor element in most English-language criticism of the movie, while Koreans have made it a central theme. Sung Hee Kim wrote "Family seen through Greek tragedy and Korean movie – Oedipus [Rex] and Old Boy." Kim Kyungae offers a different analysis, with Dae-su and Woo-jin both representing Oedipus.

=== Park Chan-wook's focus on the irrational ===
Park Chan-wook has said there is a deep influence from author Franz Kafka in this movie, and that this provides the absurdity and surrealism. In interviews, Park Chan-wook has also spoken about his movies "portraying something irrational: a phenomenon that cannot be explained logically. A portrait of humanity as neither good nor evil but rather as a complex existence." This is not only evident in Oldboy but also other movies made by Park and Bong Joon-ho. For example, Parasite, Memories of Murder, and Decision to Leave do not contain archetypal good characters. There is no moral protagonist for the audience to follow. Korean Studies professor and cultural critic David Tizzard has described this as a quality of Asian cinema: "Gone are the simple ideas of good and evil. Erased are the ideas of a moral protagonist and their immoral antagonist. But because they are not good, or at least defined as such by their creators, they become something much larger, realer, and more complete than the archetypes we are spoon-fed elsewhere."

=== Accolades ===
Award	Category	Nominee(s)	Result
Asia-Pacific Film Festival	Best Director	Park Chan-wook	Won
Asia-Pacific Film Festival	Best Actor	Choi Min-sik	Won
Austin Film Critics Association	Best Film	Oldboy	Nominated
Austin Film Critics Association	Best Foreign Film	Oldboy	Won
Bangkok International Film Festival	Best Film	Oldboy	Nominated
Bangkok International Film Festival	Best Director (tied with Christophe Barratier for Les Choristes)	Park Chan-wook	Won
Belgian Film Critics Association	Grand Prix	Oldboy	Won
Bergen International Film Festival	Audience Award	Oldboy	Won
Blue Dragon Film Awards	Best Director	Park Chan-wook	Won
Blue Dragon Film Awards	Best Actor	Choi Min-sik	Won
Blue Dragon Film Awards	Best Supporting Actress	Kang Hye-jung	Won
British Independent Film Awards	Best Foreign Independent Film	Oldboy	Won
Cannes Film Festival	Palme d'Or	Oldboy	Nominated
Cannes Film Festival	Grand Prix	Oldboy	Won
Chicago Film Critics Association	Best Foreign Language Film	Oldboy	Nominated
Critics' Choice Movie Award	Best Foreign Language Film	Oldboy	Nominated
Director's Cut Awards	Best Director	Park Chan-wook	Won
Director's Cut Awards	Best Actor	Choi Min-sik	Won
Director's Cut Awards	Best Producer	Kim Dong-joo	Won
European Film Awards	Best Non-European Film	Park Chan-wook	Nominated
Golden Trailer Awards	Best Foreign Action Trailer (tied with District 13)	Oldboy	Won
Grand Bell Awards	Best Film	Oldboy	Nominated
Grand Bell Awards	Best Director	Park Chan-wook	Won
Grand Bell Awards	Best Actor	Choi Min-sik	Won
Grand Bell Awards	Best New Actress	Kang Hye-jung	Nominated
Grand Bell Awards	Best Adapted Screenplay	Park Chan-wook	Nominated
Grand Bell Awards	Best Cinematography	Chung Chung-hoon	Nominated
Grand Bell Awards	Best Editing	Kim Sang-bum	Won
Grand Bell Awards	Best Art Direction	Ryu Seong-hie	Nominated
Grand Bell Awards	Best Lighting	Park Hyun-won	Won
Grand Bell Awards	Best Music	Jo Yeong-wook	Won
Grand Bell Awards	Best Visual Effects	Lee Jeon-hyeong, Shin Jae-ho, Jeong Do-an	Nominated
Hong Kong Film Awards	Best Asian Film	Oldboy	Won
Korean Film Awards	Best Film	Oldboy	Won
Korean Film Awards	Best Director	Park Chan-wook	Won
Korean Film Awards	Best Actor	Choi Min-sik	Won
Korean Film Awards	Best Actress	Kang Hye-jung	Nominated
Korean Film Awards	Best Supporting Actress	Yoon Jin-seo	Nominated
Korean Film Awards	Best Cinematography	Chung Chung-hoon	Nominated
Korean Film Awards	Best Editing	Kim Sang-bum	Nominated
Korean Film Awards	Best Art Direction	Ryu Seong-hie	Nominated
Korean Film Awards	Best Music	Jo Yeong-wook	Won
Korean Film Awards	Best Sound	Oldboy	Nominated
Online Film Critics Society	Best Foreign Language Film	Oldboy	Nominated
Saturn Awards	Best Action or Adventure Film	Oldboy	Nominated
Saturn Awards	Best DVD or Blu-ray Special Edition Release	Oldboy: Ultimate Collector's Edition	Nominated
Sitges Film Festival	Best Film	Oldboy	Won
Sitges Film Festival	José Luis Guarner Critic's Award	Oldboy	Won
Stockholm International Film Festival	Audience Award	Oldboy	Won

== Home media ==
In the United Kingdom, the film was watched by 300,000 television viewers on Channel 4 in 2011. This made it the year's most-watched foreign-language film on a non-BBC television channel in the UK.

== Remakes ==
=== Bollywood controversy ===
Zinda, a Bollywood film directed by writer-director Sanjay Gupta, bears a striking resemblance to Oldboy and is not an officially sanctioned remake. It was reported in 2005 that Zinda was under investigation for copyright violation. A spokesman for original distributor Show East said, "If we find out there's indeed a strong similarity between the two, it looks like we'll have to talk with our lawyers." Show East had already sold the film's rights to DreamWorks in 2004, and initially expressed legal concerns but no legal action was taken as the studio had shut down.

=== American remake ===
Steven Spielberg originally intended to produce a remake starring Will Smith in 2008. He commissioned screenwriter Mark Protosevich to adapt the screenplay. Spielberg pulled out in 2009.

An official remake directed by Spike Lee was released on 27 November 2013. 39 percent of critic reviews on Rotten Tomatoes were positive for the remake, indicating mostly negative reviews. It was also a box office bomb, grossing $5.2 million worldwide against a production budget of $30 million.

== See also ==
- Revenge play
- List of cult films
