= Ao (building) =

Building in Minato-ku, Tokyo, Japan

Coordinates: 35.66375°N 139.710722°E

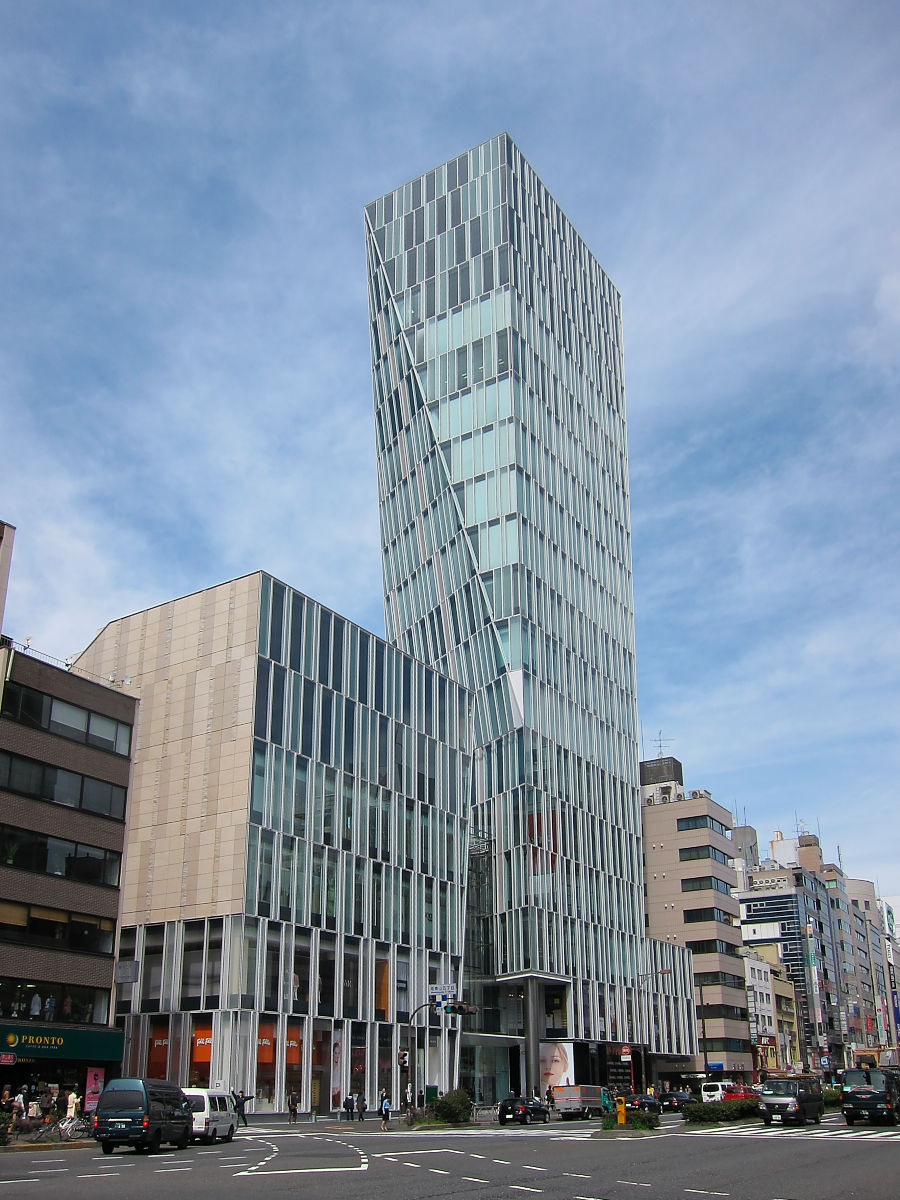
Ao Building

Ao or Ao Building, is a commercial building located in Kita-Aoyama 3-chome, Minato-ku, Tokyo.

Ao was designed by architectural firm Nihon Sekkei, which also designed Ghibli Museum and Toranomon Hills.

The 16-story reinforced concrete building is asymmetrical and thus the upper floors are larger than lower floors.

It has 2 basement floors and 16 floors above ground, and consists of a low-rise building and a high-rise building, the latter of which is approximately 90m tall. It opened on March 26, 2009. It is lit up with LEDs at night. The name comes from "Aoyama" and also is a homophone of "let's meet" (会おう) in Japanese. The building cost approximately $200 million to construct and develop.

The high-rise building houses office tenants, and the low-rise building houses commercial facilities such as fashion brand stores such as Cinéma Quanon from France and Momotaro Jeans from Kurashiki, beauty salons, restaurants serving Italian, Austrian, and Hungarian cuisine, as well as cafes and cafe bars. The building was built on the site of the former Kinokuniya, which has reopened in the basement. CHANEL had a street-level store selling perfumes and cosmetics, now closed.
