= Sunaokuwahara =

Japanese womenswear line

SUNAOKUWAHARA
- Company type: Private
- Industry: Fashion
- Founded: 1994
- Founder: Sunao Kuwahara
- Website: sunaokuwahara-store.jp

Sunaokuwahara (stylized in caps) is a Japanese womenswear brand founded by designer Sunao Kuwahara.

== History ==
=== Sunao Kuwahara ===
In 1989, Kuwahara joined Issey Miyake's design studio. Five years later, in 1994, he debuted IS Sunao Kuwahara, his own brand, which then was subsumed by the group A-Net in 1996.

=== sunaokuwahara ===
In 2003, the name was changed to sunaokuwahara. In 2011, it launched its cheaper Pink Line series, and in 2012, it launched kuskus, another series of cheaper items. Such were conceptualized in wake of market problems and increasing demand for fast fashion. Starting in the 2012–13 autumn/winter season, kuskus became its own brand and began opening its own storefronts.

After the 2015 spring/summer season, sunaokuwahara ceased operations with A-Net, leading to the closure of its Daikanyama store and others. During the brand's activities with A-Net, there were upwards of 30 stores in operation and over 100 employees.

=== SUNAOKUWAHARA ===
Shortly after, Kuwahara founded SUNAOKUWAHARA DESIGNS, with only a team of three, including Kuwahara himself, and relaunched SUNAOKUWAHARA in all capital letters starting with the 2016 spring/summer season. Right away, it sold out of three pop-ups: Kokura Izutsuya, Mitsukoshi Nihonbashi, and Matsuya Ginza.

In its independent era, SUNAOKUWAHARA released new products at one-sixth the quantity it had in the A-Net era and operated through made-to-order production. Its official storefront, which also functions as a press room, opened in Kita-Aoyama in 2018.
