= Xbox 360 Lounge =

Video game venue in Tokyo, Japan

Xbox 360 lounge
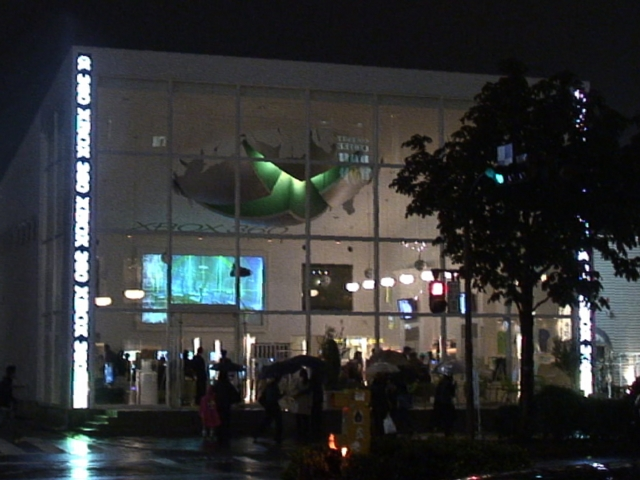
- Entrance of the Xbox 360 Lounge
- Interactive map of the Xbox 360 lounge area

General information
- Location: Aoyama, Tokyo, Japan
- Construction started: November 1, 2005

Design and construction
- Architect: Microsoft

The Xbox 360 Lounge was a venue in Aoyama, Tokyo, close to the upscale Omotesandō, Tokyo, shopping area. It was opened on November 1, 2005, to boost Xbox 360 awareness in Japan, several weeks before the Xbox 360 release on November 22, 2005.

The lounge was composed of three main areas: a 256 m^{2} (2,760 sq ft) event space equipped with five large display screens, an area containing Xbox 360 game kiosks, and a 70-seat café. It was open daily from November 1, 2005, to February 12, 2006.

== Opening night ==
Microsoft gathered Japanese celebrities from inside and outside the gaming industry on opening night. Big-name game creators like Keiji Inafune (Capcom), Yuji Naka (Sega), Hideo Kojima (Konami), Yoichi Okamoto (Game Republic) and Hiromichi Tanaka (Square Enix) took the stage first and gave brief statements about the Xbox 360. Naka stated "I hope the industry is spurred by the appearance of the Xbox 360," with Kojima simply stating "I've been waiting!"

Many of the stars are big in Japan, but unknown in America: Hitomi Nagasawa, Ishikawa Asami, Kazuhi Sakuraba (the Pride fighter), Otoha (future Gaming Life in Japan young idol). Olympic swimmer Kosuke Kitajima, when clued in on the fact that there are not any swimming games, pointed out that it is hard to make such a game because you can't see the swimmer's face. Many of these stars, including track and field star Dai Tamesue, had designed a face plate.
