= Astral Project (manga) =

Japanese manga series

- North American cover the first volume

月の光 (Tsuki No Hikari)
- Genre: Mystery, supernatural
- Manga
- Written by: Marginal
- Illustrated by: Syuji Takeya
- Published by: Enterbrain
- English publisher: NA: CMX Manga
- Magazine: Comic Beam
- Original run: 2005 – 2007
- Volumes: 4

Astral Project (Japanese: 月の光, Hepburn: Tsuki No Hikari) is a Japanese manga series written by Marginal and illustrated by Takeya Syuji. It began serialization in 2005 issue of the monthly seinen manga magazine Comic Beam. It was published in English by CMX Manga, in French by Casterman, in German by Carlsen Manga, and in Portuguese by Panini Comics.

== Reception ==
Ed Sizemore found the art in the first part of the first volume distracting, and the lead character to be unsympathetic, but felt that the manga was well written. Deb Aoki described the manga as a "glass onion of a mystery". Katherine Dacey found the story "immersive".
