= Hip Land Music Corp. =

Hip Land Music Corporation (Limited)
- Parent company: Hip Land Group
- Founded: July 19, 1988
- Genre: Pop, rock, contemporary R&B, blues
- Location: 2-20-4 Minami-Aoyama, Minato, Tokyo, Japan 107-0062
- Official website: http://www.hipland.co.jp/

Hip Land Music Corporation (Limited) (株式会社ヒップランドミュージックコーポレーション, Kabushiki Gaisha Hippu Rando Myūjikku), a subsidiary of small entertainment conglomerate Hip Land Group, is a Japanese record label formed in 1988.

== Sublabels ==
Its sublabels include:

- RD Records,
- Monte Bleu,
- on the beach,
- basque,
- GrindHouse Recordings,
- MirrorBall,
- Plants Label,
- nest,
- Minor Swing,
- Middle Tempo Production,
- In the Garden,
- HLM Label,
- I Want the Moon,
- Parabolica, and
- we are

== Hip Land Group ==
- Greens Corporation
- Kiss Corporation
- Sweet Boon Music, Inc.
- Longfellow Agency (Bump of Chicken's agency)

== Artists ==
Past and present artists on the label include Gontiti, Misako Odani, Ego-Wrappin', Clazziquai, Sakanaction, Bump of Chicken, Lena Park, cutman-booche, Small Circle of Friends, Britain, Naomi and Goro, Lamp, Improve, copa salvo, Bamboo Swing, Studio Apartment, The Little Elephant, K.P.M., Ohta-San, J'ouvert, Steve and Teresa, Blindspott, Lacuna Coil, A Static Lullaby, Aphesia, Yourness, Yesterday's Rising and Shellshock.

== Talents ==
- Lena Park (Japan)
- Shirley Tomioka (radio DJ, FM802)
- Mayumi Chiwaki (radio DJ, FM Cocolo)
- Sakanaction
- Bump of Chicken (through Longfellow Agency)
- Ego-Wrappin' (through Sweet Boon Music)
- Gontiti (through Sweet Boon Music)
- Avengers in Sci-Fi
- Misako Odani

== See also ==
- List of record labels
