= Mark Protosevich =

American screenwriter

Mark Protosevich is an American screenwriter. He is best known for his screenplays for the films The Cell (2000), I Am Legend (2007) and Thor (2011).

He has also written two remakes: Poseidon (2006), an update of The Poseidon Adventure (1972) for director Wolfgang Petersen, and Oldboy (2013), an adaptation of the 2003 South Korean film of the same name for Spike Lee.

== Life and career ==
Protosevich was born in Chicago, Illinois and is an alumnus of Columbia College.

In late 1996, he wrote the script for the unproduced Batman Unchained, a mooted third film in the superhero franchise to be directed by Joel Schumacher. In 2011, Steven Spielberg met with Protosevich to discuss story ideas for a fourth film in the Jurassic Park franchise. Protosevich wrote two story treatments for the film, neither of which were produced.

He recently created the Apple TV+ series Sugar, which premiered on April 5, 2024, his first foray into television. He wrote or co-wrote the majority of the episodes, as well as serving as executive producer.

Protosevich currently lives on Cape Cod with his wife, the painter Robena Malicoat.

== Filmography ==
Film

| Year | Title | Writer | Co-producer |
|---|---|---|---|
| 2000 | The Cell | Yes | Yes |
| 2006 | Poseidon | Yes | No |
| 2007 | I Am Legend | Yes | No |
| 2011 | Thor | Story | No |
| 2013 | Oldboy | Yes | Yes |

Television

| Year | Title | Writer | Executive producer |
|---|---|---|---|
| 2024 | Sugar | Yes | Yes |
