= Old Boy (manga) =

Manga written by Garon Tsuchiya and Nobuaki Minegishi

- Cover to Vol. 1

オールドボーイ―ルーズ戦記 (Ōrudo Bōi Rūzu Senki)
- Genre: Action; Psychological thriller
- Manga
- Written by: Garon Tsuchiya
- Illustrated by: Nobuaki Minegishi
- Published by: Futabasha
- English publisher: NA: Dark Horse Comics
- Imprint: Action Comics
- Magazine: Manga Action
- Original run: 1996 – 1998
- Volumes: 8
- Live-action films
- Oldboy (2003); Zinda (2006); Oldboy (2013)

Old Boy (Japanese: オールド・ボーイ, Hepburn: Ōrudo Bōi) is a Japanese manga series written by Garon Tsuchiya and illustrated by Nobuaki Minegishi. The narrative follows the protagonist Shinichi Gotō, a man who, after a decade of incarceration in a private prison, is suddenly freed. After his release, Gotō must find his captors and discover the reason for his confinement.

Old Boy was serialized in the Futabasha magazine Weekly Manga Action from 1996 to 1998, with a total of 79 chapters among eight collected volumes released during that time. The series was picked up for North American localization by Dark Horse Comics and released between 2006 and 2007. The manga was also adapted into an award-winning South Korean film, directed by Park Chan-wook in 2003. In 2013, Spike Lee directed an American remake of the 2003 film.

== Plot ==
Intoxicated and confused, 25-year-old Shinichi Gotō finds himself in a small room inside a private jail after being kidnapped and imprisoned during one fateful night for unknown reasons. Despite his pleadings, none of the guards will tell him who kidnapped him or why he is being held captive. As the days go by, his forced isolation slowly takes a toll on his sanity. He finds an outlet through training his mind and body for the day he will be able to wreak vengeance.

After ten years of solitary confinement in a maximum security cell, with only a television for company, he is suddenly released. Once outside, he encounters a much changed world. His long imprisonment ripped him from society and kept him from having the normal life he desired. With nothing to lose, he begins his mission to hunt down the identities of his captors and uncover the reason behind his imprisonment. However, it seems that the unidentified person behind Shinichi's captivity is not finished with him just yet, and thus begins a twisted game where only the winner survives.

=== Characters ===
Shinichi Gotō (五島 慎一, Gotō Shin'ichi)
The protagonist who was mysteriously captured and held hostage in solitary confinement for a decade.
Takāki Kakinuma
The villain, Gotō's 6th grade classmate who now seeks revenge for Gotō inadvertently shattering his sense of self-worth.
Yoko Kurata
Gotō and Kakinuma's 6th grade teacher who has become a writer using the pen name Yayoi Kusama.
Eri
A lady who became Gotō's girlfriend. She is actually a paid actress under hypnosis placed upon her by Kakinuma.
Kyoko Kataoka
Kakinuma's henchwoman.

== Media ==
=== Manga ===
Old Boy was serialized in the Futabasha magazine Weekly Manga Action from 1996 to 1998. A total of 79 chapters among eight tankōbon (collected volumes) were released in Japan from May 28, 1997, to October 28, 1998. Between June 19 and July 17, 2007, Futabasha re-released the entire series in five, larger volumes. In 2005, Dark Horse Comics bought the rights to make an English translation of the book for its customers worldwide. All eight volumes were released from July 5, 2006, to October 10, 2007. In 2025 and 2026, Dark Horse rereleased the complete series in two deluxe hardcovers.

==== Volumes ====
No.	Original release date	Original ISBN	English release date	English ISBN
1	May 28, 1997	4-575-82240-X	July 5, 2006	1-59307-568-5
2	September 12, 1997	4-575-82274-4	October 4, 2006	1-59307-569-3
3	March 24, 1998	4-575-82320-1	December 4, 2006	1-59307-570-7
4	May 24, 1998	4-575-82332-5	February 7, 2007	1-59307-703-3
5	July 27, 1998	4-575-82353-8	April 4, 2007	1-59307-714-9
6	August 28, 1998	4-575-82362-7	June 6, 2007	1-59307-720-3
7	September 28, 1998	4-575-82369-4	August 1, 2007	1-59307-721-1
8	October 28, 1998	4-575-82378-3	October 10, 2007	1-59307-722-X

=== Films ===
In 2003, it was adapted into the award-winning Korean film Oldboy by South Korean director Park Chan-wook. The film was a huge international success and went on to win various awards including the Grand Prix of the Jury at the 57th Cannes Film Festival awards ceremony. Oldboy is regarded as one of the greatest films of all time and has been included in numerous "best-of" lists by many publications. In 2008, Oldboy was placed 64th on an Empire list of the top 500 movies of all time. In 2020, The Guardian ranked it number 3 among the classics of modern South Korean cinema.

In 2006, an Indian unauthorized adaptation titled Zinda directed by Sanjay Gupta was released. Show East, the producers of the 2003 Oldboy film, who had already sold the remake rights to DreamWorks in 2004 had initially expressed legal concerns, but no legal action was taken as the studio had shut down.

A subsequent American film remake of the Korean film was directed by Spike Lee in 2013.

== Reception ==
In 2007, the Old Boy manga won an Eisner Award in the category of Best U.S. Edition of International Material – Japan. Eduardo Chavez of Mania.com noted that "titles like Old Boy... take their time to create a wonderful of paranoia and drama". Anime News Network's Carlo Santos praised the artwork, which "fits the tone of the series well" and the pacing of the story, but mentioned poorly developed characters.
