= Marley Caribu =

Japanese manga writer (1947–2018)

- 狩撫 麻礼
- Born: Garon Tsuchiya; 1947; Tokyo, Japan
- Died: January 7, 2018 (aged 70–71)
- Other names: Marley Carib, Marginal, Yuuhou Hijikata
- Occupation: Manga writer
- Known for: Old Boy; Astral Project; Reverse Edge: Ōkawabata Tanteisha

Garon Tsuchiya (Japanese: 土屋 ガロン, Hepburn: Tsuchiya Garon; 1947 – January 7, 2018), also known as Marley Caribu (狩撫 麻礼, Karibu Marei) and Marginal (in Astral Project), was a Japanese manga writer.

In 1986 he completed his first major works in collaboration with Akyo Makata in Ahomansu and Meisouou Boodaa. Afterwards, Tsuchiya collaborated with draftsman Kaiji Kawaguchi (Zipang, Spirit of The Sun) for the title, Tokishozo Disturbs and Losses. In 1992–1993 he collaborated with Jiro Taniguchi for the manga Blue Fighter (青の戦士, Ao no Senshi), Knuckle Wars (ナックル・ウォーズ, Nakkuru) and Live! Odyssey (LIVE! オデッセイ).

He also collaborated with Takashi Imashiro for the manga Takopon. He has collaborated with manga artist Nobuaki Minegishi for the manga Old Boy, upon which Park Chan-wook's 2003 film Oldboy is based.

Tsuchiya died on January 7, 2018.

== Works ==
- Old Boy (1996–1998)
- Astral Project (2005–2007)
- Reverse Edge: Ōkawabata Tanteisha (2008–2018; his death) (as Yuuhou Hijikata)

== See also ==
- A Homansu, a film based on his comic.
