= Kinokuniya =

High-end Japanese supermarket chain

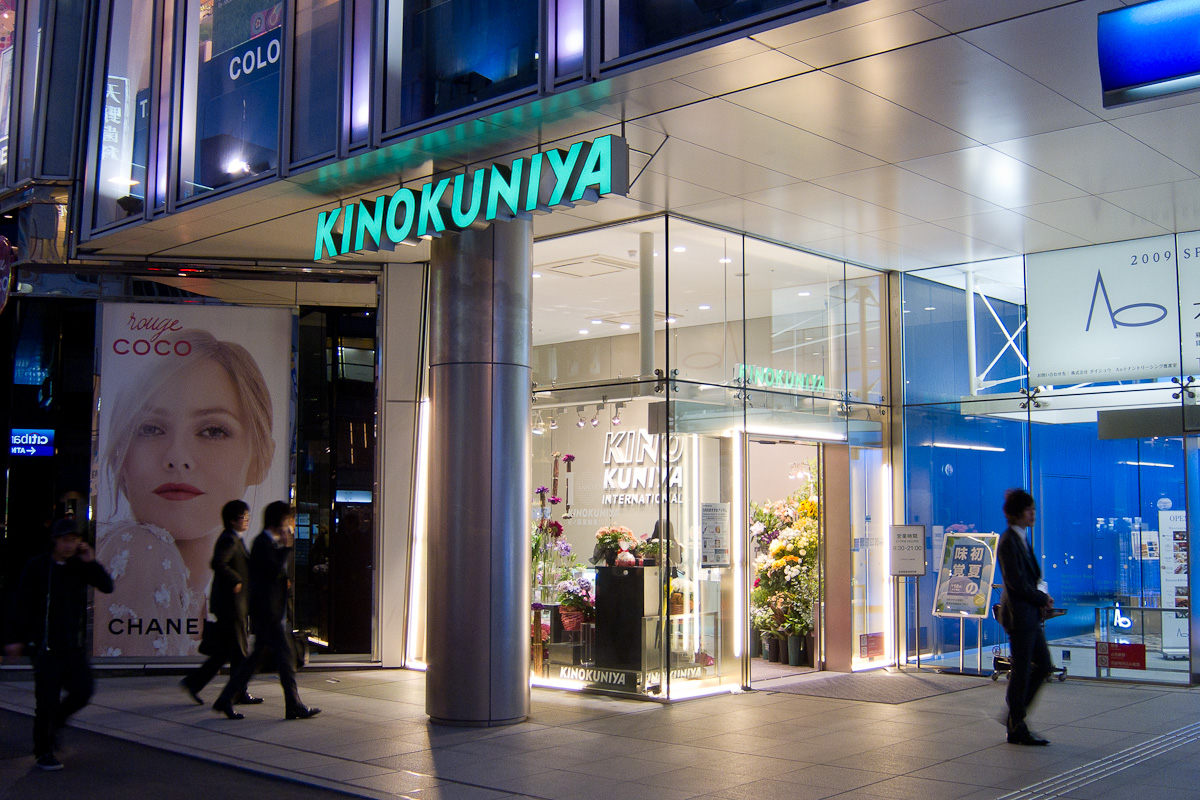
Kinokuniya in Ao Building

Kinokuniya (紀ノ国屋) is a high-end Japanese supermarket chain headquartered in Shinjuku Ward, Tokyo. It is a subsidiary of East Japan Railway Company (JR East).

There is no relationship with retailer and publisher Kinokuniya Books, which too has its head office in Tokyo.

== History ==
Kinokuniya was founded in 1910 (Meiji 43) as a fresh fruit store in Tokyo. Masui Norio, who helped out in the family business, closed the Aoyama fruit store after the material control orders during the Pacific War meant that he could no longer sell high-end fruit, and rebuilt it as a fruit and vegetable store after the war in 1949. Modeled after American supermarkets, the Aoyama store then changed its model from a face-to-face fruit store to a self-service supermarket. The company and the National Supermarket Association claim it as "Japan's first self-service supermarket."

In November 2008 the Aoyama store reopened on the basement floor of the Ao Building, which was built on the site of the old store.

Kinokuniya Co., Ltd. became a wholly owned subsidiary of East Japan Railway Company on April 1, 2010. As of 2021, it had 34 outlets, mainly located in Greater Tokyo.
