= Ego-Wrappin' =

Japanese jazz and rock musical duo

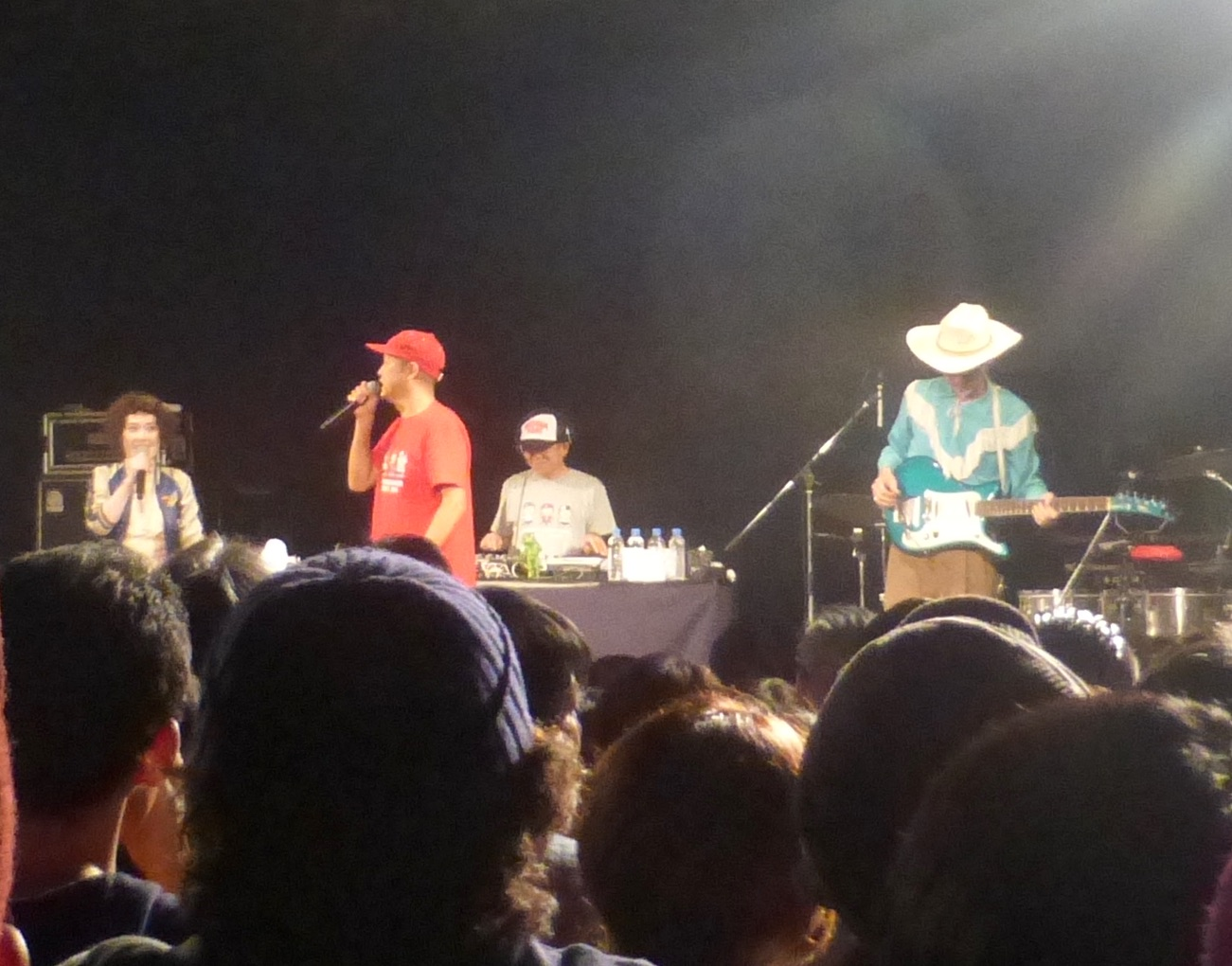
- On stage with Scha Dara Parr, 2017

Background information
- Origin: Osaka, Japan
- Genres: Jazz, rock, cabaret, kayōkyoku
- Years active: 1996–present
- Labels: Metro Crew; RD Records; Polydor; Universal Music Japan; Toy's Factory
- Members: Yoshie Nakano; Masaki Mori
- Website: egowrappin.com

Ego-Wrappin' (stylised as EGO-WRAPPIN') is a Japanese jazz and rock musical duo, composed of vocalist Yoshie Nakano and guitarist Masaki Mori. The group formed in Osaka in 1996, releasing their debut album Blue Speaker in 1998. The band gained national recognition with their cabaret and kayōkyoku inspired song "Midnight Dejavu (Shikisai no Blues)" (2000).

== Biography ==
Ego-Wrappin' was formed in 1996 in Osaka. Originally the band focused their activities in the Kansai region, performing at live houses alongside acts such as Mondo Grosso and Attica Blues. Initially, the group released music through the independent label Metro Crew Records, including their debut extended play Calling Me (1996).

In 1998, the band were featured in the soundtrack for the Eri Fukatsu-starring drama Kirakira Hikaru, covering The Beach Boys' "Disney Girls (1957)". In June of the same year, the band released their debut album, the English language Blue Speaker, through independent label RD Records, an Osaka-based subsidiary of Hip Land Music Corp. The album was successful on local Osaka area independent music charts, and was praised by musician Seiichi Yamamoto.

In 1999, the band released two extended plays: their first Japanese language extended play His Choice of Shoes Is Ill! in February, followed by Swing for Joy in November. A song from the extended play, "A Love Song", which featured Osaka ska band Determinations, received strong airplay on regional radio stations such as FM Ishikawa and FM North Wave (Hokkaido). From 2000, the band began performing concerts in Tokyo and other regions of Japan, outside of Kansai.

In 2000, the band came to national attention with their song "Shikisai no Blues", a cabaret and kayōkyoku song written in the style of 1960s jazz singer Mina Aoe. Originally the song was released as a part of the extended play Shikisai no Blues. When it was later released as a stand-alone single/extended play in 2001, it sold over 193,000 copies in Japan.

In May 2001, Ego-Wrappin' established their own sub-label of Toy's Factory called Minor Swing, and released their third album Michishio no Romance. This album, as well as Night Food (2002) and Merry Merry (2004) were commercially successful, all being certified gold by the Recording Industry Association of Japan. Night Food featured the song "Kuchibashi ni Cherry" (2002), which was the theme song of the Nippon TV drama Shiritsu Tantei Hama Mike.

In 2006, Ego-Wrappin' released their fifth album On the Rocks!, and toured Europe for the first time, performing concerts in Denmark and Sweden as a part of the Tokyo Sound Revolution event. During the tour, Ego-Wrappin' formed a support band, The Gossip of Jaxx, who performed during the album's tour. In 2009, the band released Ego-Wrappin' and the Gossip of Jaxx: an album featuring music recorded with this support band. In 2010, the band released Sure Shot, a split single with rock band Brahman.

In 2014, Ego-Wrappin' performed the theme songs for the drama Reverse Edge: Ōkawabata Tanteisha.

== Discography ==
- Blue Speaker (1998)
- Michishio no Romance (2001)
- Night Food (2002)
- Merry Merry (2004)
- On the Rocks! (2006)
- Ego-Wrappin' and the Gossip of Jaxx (2009)
- Naimono Nedari no Deadheat (2010)
- Steal a Person's Heart (2013)
- Dream Baby Dream (2019)
