= Misako Odani =

Japanese singer, pianist and songwriter

Misako Odani

Misako Odani (小谷美紗子) (born November 4, 1976, in Miyazu, Kyoto-fu), is a Japanese singer, songwriter, and pianist. Misako, whose songs make heavy use of the piano, began playing the instrument at age seven, and studied abroad in Australia in 1994. Since entering the music industry in 1996, she has released eight albums, and many singles. Her most recent album, Koto no Ha (ことの は), was released in May 2010.

== Discography ==
| October 23, 1996 | 嘆さの雪 single (en. Sighing Snow), MCA: MVCD-1001 |
| February 21, 1997 | 自分 single, MCA: MVDD-49 |
| February 21, 1997 | PROFILE -too early to tell-, MCA: MVCD-43 |
| April 23, 1997 | 永遠にねむる single, MCA: MVDH-1 |
| October 22, 1997 | The Stone single, MCA: MVDH-6 |
| November 21, 1997 | あなたはやって来る ～Dear Santa～ single, MCA: MVDH-9 |
| December 3, 1997 | I, MCA/Universal: MVCH-29009 |
| October 21, 1998 | こんな風にして終わるもの single, MCA/Universal: MVDH-18 |
| February 24, 1999 | 火の川 single (en. River of Fire), MCA/Universal: MVDH-21 |
| March 25, 1999 | Utaki (うたき) (Utaki), MCA/Universal: MVCH-29030 |
| September 20, 2000 | 眠りのうた single (en. Song of Sleep), Universal: UUCH-5002 |
| November 1, 2000 | Edelweiss single, Universal: UUCH-5005 |
| November 11, 2000 | Uchu no Mama ja:宇宙のママ (Uchu no Mama), Universal: UUCH-1006 |
| February 6, 2002 | 街灯の下で single (en. Under the Streetlight), Universal: UUCH-5051 |
| February 6, 2002 | Quarternote – THE BEST OF ODANI MISAKO 1996–2000 (compilation), Universal: UUCH-1043 |
| March 21, 2002 | ハル single (en. Hull), Universal: UUCH-5053 |
| March 21, 2002 | Then, Universal: UUCH-1049 |
| March 26, 2003 | Off You Go single, Toshiba/EMI: TOCT-4464 |
| May 14, 2003 | Night, Toshiba/EMI: TOCT-25027 |
| October 15, 2003 | featured on track 11 of Sing Like Talking's Renscence, Universal: UPCH-1290 |
| October 29, 2003 | Feather, Toshiba/EMI: TOCT-22229 |
| November 27, 2003 | 虹色の吹雪 single (en. Rainbow-Coloured Snowstorm), Toshiba/EMI: TOCT-4637 |
| April 13, 2005 | Adore, Hip Land Music: HLMCD-0001 |
| March 22, 2006 | Who single, Hip Land Music: HLMCD-0002 |
| May 17, 2006 | Catch, Hip Land Music: HLMCD-0003 |
| March 7, 2007 | Quarternote 2nd − THE BEST OF ODANI MISAKO 1996–2003 best album, Universal: UPCH-1536 |
| June 13, 2007 | Out, Hip Land Music: HLMCD-0005 |
| August 27, 2008 | Odani Misako Trio, Universal: UMCK-1271 |
| May 12, 2010 | Koto no Ha, Hip Land Music: RDCA-1014 |

== Filmography ==
- April 21, 1999 弾き語る (Hikigataru), a compilation of music videos and behind-the-scenes clips of recording sessions.
