= Aoyama Tadanari =

Japanese general (1551–1613)

Aoyama Tadanari (青山 忠成; September 6, 1551 – April 10, 1613) was a Tokugawa general and chief retainer at the end of the Sengoku and start of the Edo period. He was the father of Aoyama Tadatoshi, and the Aoyama region of Shibuya is named after him.

== History ==
The Aoyama clan were provincial lords of Dōdo village, Nukata District in Mikawa Province (present Okazaki, Aichi). Aoyama Tadakado, Tadanari's father, served both Matsudaira Hirotada and Tokugawa Ieyasu, and thus Tadanari served near Ieyasu since he was young. In 1572, his father died in battle with Takeda Shingen and Tadanari inherited the estate.

Tadanari was highly trusted by Ieyasu, and in 1585 he commanded him to guard his son Hidetada. In 1588, Tadanari accompanied Hidetada to the capital where he was granted Junior Fifth Rank, Lower Grade of Hitachi Province by Toyotomi Hideyoshi. In 1590 Ieyasu relocates to Kantō and promotes Tadanari to magistrate of Edo with lands worth 5,000 koku (increased by 2,000 koku in 1593). His estates centered on Harajuku village and extended from part of Akasaka to Shibuya. Present day Aoyama is so named because one of Tadanari's mansions was located there.

In 1600, Tadanari joined Hidetada's army at the Battle of Sekigahara and obtained 15,000 koku of lands between Kazusa Province and Shimōsa Province. In addition to being the Edo magistrate, he also served as the general magistrate for the entire Kantō region. After the start of the Edo shogunate, he was heavily involved in shogunate policy along with Honda Masanobu and Naitō Kiyonari. Along with Naitō in 1606, he is temporarily sentenced to house arrest but is soon pardoned.
