= Reverse Edge: Ōkawabata Tanteisha =

Japanese manga and television series

- Cover of the first volume as published by Nihon Bungeisha

リバースエッジ 大川端探偵社 (Ribāsu Ejji Ōkawabata Tanteisha)
- Manga
- Written by: Garon Tsuchiya
- Illustrated by: Akio Tanaka
- Published by: Nihon Bungeisha
- Magazine: Weekly Manga Goraku
- Original run: 2008 – 2022
- Volumes: 11
- Television drama
- Directed by: Hitoshi Ohne
- Written by: Hitoshi Ohne
- Original network: TV Tokyo
- Original run: April 19, 2014 – July 12, 2014
- Episodes: 12

Reverse Edge: Ōkawabata Tanteisha (Japanese: リバースエッジ 大川端探偵社, Hepburn: Ribāsu Ejji Ōkawabata Tanteisha; lit. "Reverse Edge: Ōkawabata Detective Agency") is a Japanese manga series by Garon Tsuchiya and Akio Tanaka. Its chapters are serialized in the manga magazine Weekly Manga Goraku and published in tankōbon volumes by Nihon Bungeisha. The series was compiled into 11 volumes.

In January 2014, it was announced it would be adapted into a Japanese television drama series starring Joe Odagiri. TV Tokyo aired twelve episodes between April 19, and July 12, 2014.

== Manga volumes ==
No.	Japanese release date	Japanese ISBN
1	October 19, 2009	978-4-537-12505-4
2	November 27, 2010	978-4-537-12672-3
3	May 28, 2011	978-4-537-12745-4
4	September 28, 2012	978-4-537-12937-3
5	July 4, 2014	978-4-537-13184-0
6	January 29, 2016	978-4-537-13398-1
7	May 9, 2016	978-4-537-13440-7
8	October 8, 2016	978-4-537-13494-0
9	November 29, 2017	978-4-537-13658-6
10	April 27, 2019	978-4-537-13909-9
11	October 28, 2022	978-4-537-14558-8

== Drama episodes ==
No.	Title	Original release date (Note: Reverse Edge: Ōkawabata Tanteisha aired in TV Tokyo's 24:12 (00:12 JST) time slot, which means the episodes aired the days following the ones showed by the sources.)
1	"The Last Supper" "Saigo no Bansan" (最後の晩餐)	April 19, 2014
2	"Sex Fantasy" "Sekkusu Fantajī" (セックスファンタジー)	April 26, 2014
3	"A Marriage" "Aru Kekkon" (ある結婚)	May 3, 2014
4	"Idol Momonoki Marin" "Aidoru Momonoki Marin" (アイドル・桃ノ木マリン)	May 10, 2014
5	"Scary Face Grand Prix" "Kowai Kao Guran Puri" (怖い顔グランプリ)	May 17, 2014
6	"Go for it, Bento" "Ganbare Bentō" (がんばれ弁当)	May 24, 2014
7	"Summer's Yuki-onna" "Natsu no Yuki-onna" (夏の雪女)	May 31, 2014
8	"Female Gang Leader" "Onna Banchō" (女番長)	July 7, 2014
9	"I'll Take your Life" "Inochi Moraimasu" (命もらいます)	July 7, 2014
10	"Reveiving Milk / Duel Substitute" "Morai Chichi / Kettō Dai Uchi" (もらい乳 / 決闘代打ち)	June 21, 2014
11	"Top Runner" "Toppu Rannā" (トップランナー)	June 28, 2014
12	"The Client is the Director" "Irai-sha wa Shochō" (依頼者は所長)	July 12, 2014
