= Kita-Aoyama =

Kita-Aoyama 北青山
- District
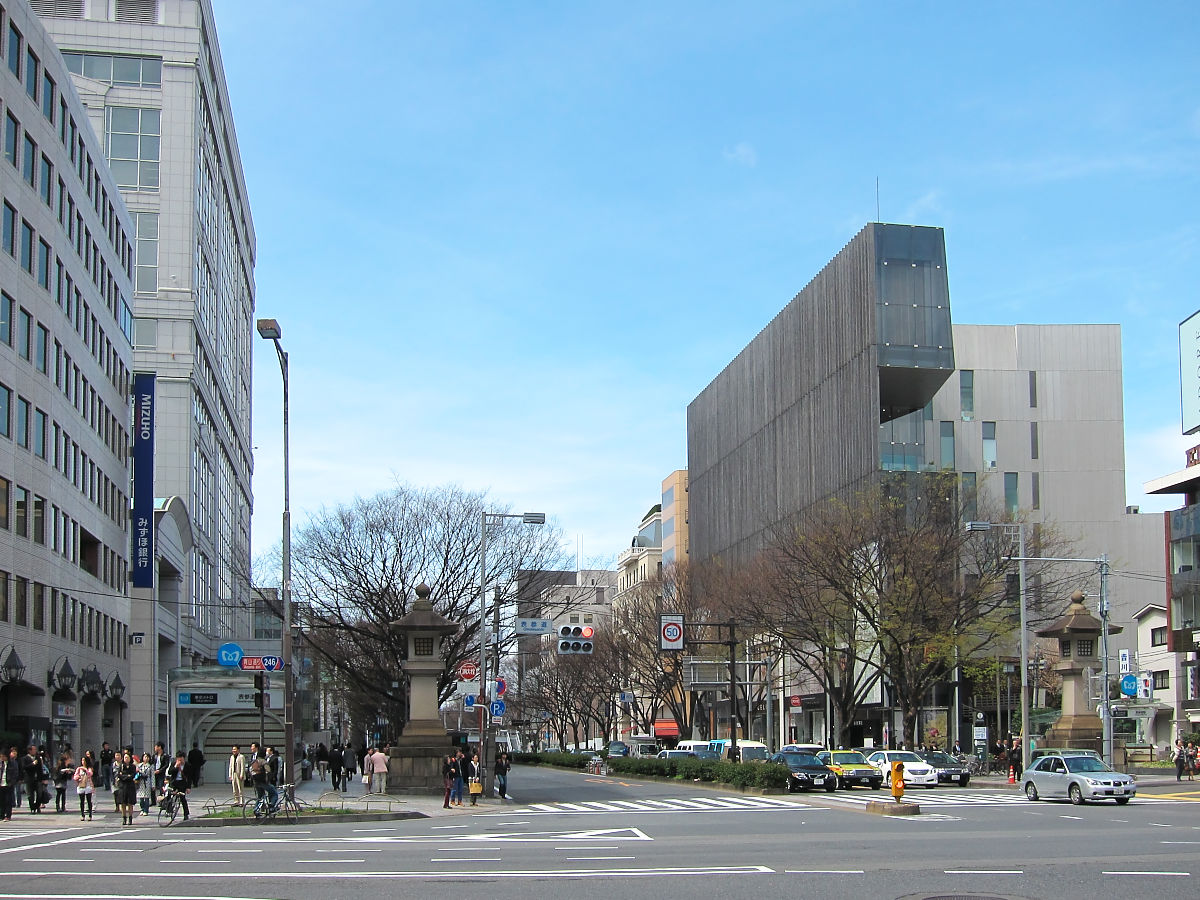

- Location of Kita-Aoyama within Tokyo Location of Kita-Aoyama within Tokyo Bay
- Coordinates: 35°40′21.39″N 139°43′5.43″E
- Country: Japan
- City: Tokyo
- Ward: Minato

Area
  - Total: 0.50 km^{2} (0.19 sq mi)

Population (August 1, 2019)
  - Total: 2,633
  - Density: 5,300/km^{2} (14,000/sq mi)
- Time zone: UTC+9 (JST)
- Postal code: 107-0061
- Area code: 03

Kita-Aoyama (北青山, Kitaaoyama) is a district of Minato, Tokyo, Japan.

== Education ==
Minato City Board of Education operates public elementary and junior high schools.

Kita-Aoyama 1-2-chōme and 3-chōme 1-4-ban are zoned to Aoyama Elementary School (青山小学校). 3-chōme 5-15-ban are zoned to Seinan Elementary School (青南小学校). All of Kita Aoyama is zoned to Aoyama Junior High School (青山中学校)

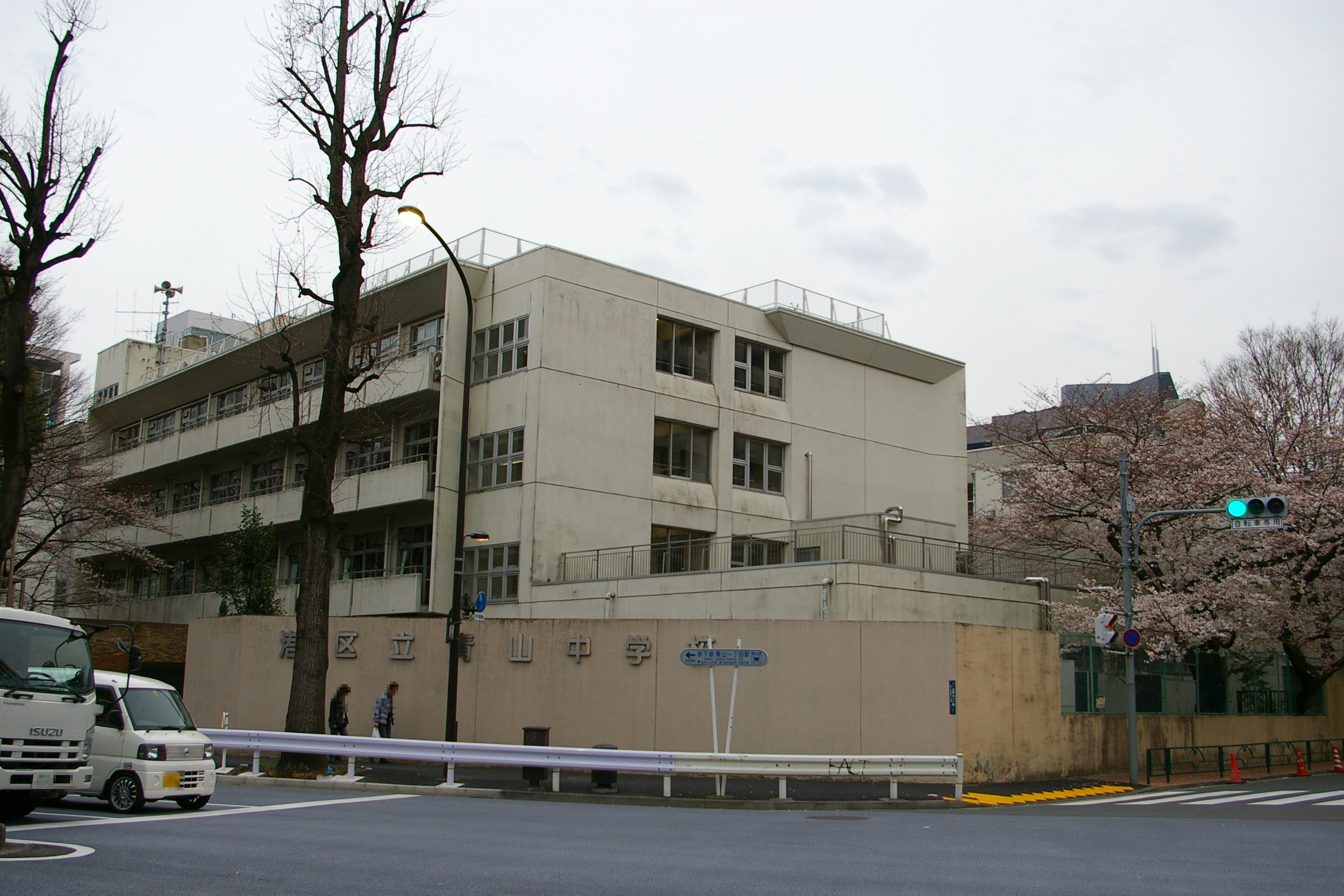
Aoyama Junior High School (青山中学校)
