= Nobuaki Minegishi =

Japanese manga artist and illustrator (born 1959)

- Born: June 15, 1959 (aged 65); Miyagi Prefecture, Japan
- Occupation: Manga artist
- Awards: 2007 Eisner Award

Nobuaki Minegishi (Japanese: 嶺岸信明, Hepburn: Minegishi Nobuaki) is a Japanese manga artist and illustrator, whose works include Old Boy, Aburemon, Jungle, Tenpai, Hoozuki, Joi Reika, and Maboroshi No Kakero.

Minegishi's series Old Boy won the 2007 Eisner Award for Best U.S. Edition of International Material - Japan.
