= Tetsujin 28: The Movie =

- Promotional poster
- Directed by: Shin Togashi
- Screenplay by: Hiroshi Saitō; Kota Yamada
- Based on: Tetsujin 28-go by Mitsuteru Yokoyama
- Produced by: Sakura Kanjiro
- Starring: Sousuke Ikematsu; Yu Aoi; Hiroko Yakushimaru
- Cinematography: Hideo Yamamoto
- Edited by: Soichi Ueno
- Music by: Akira Senju
- Production companies: Crossmedia; Media Wave
- Distributed by: Shochiku
- Release date: March 19, 2005 (Japan)
- Running time: 114 minutes
- Country: Japan
- Language: Japanese

Tetsujin 28: The Movie (Japanese: 鉄人28号) is a 2005 Japanese live-action film based on the 1956 manga Tetsujin 28-go by Mitsuteru Yokoyama. Directed by Shin Togashi, it was the first original film based on the series, as well as the first to be released theatrically.

== Plot ==
Shotaro Kaneda is a young boy living in Tokyo with his widowed mother, Yoko. He is haunted by the death of his scientist father, Dr. Shoichiro Kaneda, and is frequently bullied at school. One day, a giant robot called Black Ox wreaks havoc on the city. Shotaro receives a phone call from his father's former assistant, who tells Shotaro that he is destined to save the world. He guides Shotaro to the location of Tetsujin 28, a giant robot developed by the Japanese during World War II and hidden away by Dr. Kaneda for Shotaro to find. With the help of Chief Otsuka and classmate Mami Tachibana, Shotaro learns to control Tetsujin and does battle with the villainous Dr. Reiji Takumi and Black Ox.

== Cast ==
- Sousuke Ikematsu as Shotaro Kaneda
- Yu Aoi as Mami Tachibana
- Akira Emoto as Chief Yunosuke Otsuka
- Teruyuki Kagawa as Dr. Reiji Takumi
- Hiroko Yakushimaru as Yoko Kaneda
- Hiroshi Abe as Dr. Shoichiro Kaneda
- Ayako Kawahara as Layla Neilson Kijima
- Katsuo Nakamura as Tatsuzo Ayabe
- Masato Ibu as Keitaro Tanoura
- Megumi Hayashibara as Black Ox (voice)
- Naomi Nishida as Yumiko Yashiro
- Rena Tanaka as Asuka Serizawa
- Ryūshi Mizukami as Hideyuki Kawai
- Sousuke Takaoka as Kenji Murasame
- Tomoko Kitagawa as Shizue Kato
- Toshifumi Muramatsu as Seijiro Takahashi
- Yuko Nakazawa as Kana Ejima
- Satoshi Tsumabuki as Windchime Seller
- Shin Yazawa as Reporter

== Development ==
Tetsujin 28-go was originally adapted into a live action television drama in 1960, and later as an anime in 1963, which became popular in North America under the title of Gigantor.

There were talks of a live-action Gigantor adaptation around 1994 by Fox Family Films, a subsidiary of 20th Century Fox, planned with a budget of roughly $35 million to $50 million. Wanting Gigantor to become a major blockbuster franchise, Fox hired writers Steve Meerson and Peter Krikes to pen the script, which would have downsized the robot's height from 50 feet to just 12 feet, as well as updating and modernizing the design, using morphing effects made with CGI. Manga creator Mitsuteru Yokoyama would have been credited as Executive Producer on the project, along with Fred Ladd (a screenwriter who wrote the dubbing for the original anime), and Aeiji Katayama. For unexplained reasons, it never went into production.

Unlike the original manga and previous adaptations (excluding the 1980 anime and Tetsujin 28-go FX), the film is set in modern-day while still based on the original story, with emphasis placed on Shotaro Kaneda's coming-of-age subplot. The mecha were rendered entirely with CGI. Open auditions were held for the roles of Shotaro and Mami. Sousuke Ikematsu and Yu Aoi were each selected from among 10,000 applicants.

== Reception ==
The film garnered indifferent reviews from critics.
