= 23rd Yokohama Film Festival =

2002 film festival edition

- Location: Kannai Hall, Yokohama, Kanagawa, Japan
- Founded: 1980
- Festival date: 3 February 2002

The 23rd Yokohama Film Festival (第23回ヨコハマ映画祭) was held on 3 February 2002 in Kannai Hall, Yokohama, Kanagawa.

== Awards ==
- Best Film: Go
- Best Actor: Yōsuke Kubozuka – Go, Drowning Fish
- Best Supporting Actor: Tsutomu Yamazaki – Go, The Guys from Paradise, Go Heat Man!, Jo gakusei no tomo
- Best Supporting Actress:
  - Kou Shibasaki – Go, Battle Royale
  - Yūki Amami – Quartet for Two, Inugami
- Best Director: Isao Yukisada – Go
- Best New Director:
  - Masahiko Nagasawa – Koko ni Iru Koto
  - Shin Togashi – Off-Balance
- Best Screenplay: Kankurō Kudō – Go
- Best Cinematography: Naoki Kayano – Onmyoji
- Best New Talent:
  - Takato Hosoyamada – Go, All About Lily Chou-Chou
  - Hitomi Manaka – Koko ni Iru Koto
  - Megumi Hatachiya – Off-Balance
- Special Prize: Shinji Sōmai (Career)

== Best 10 ==
1. Go
2. Waterboys
3. Battle Royale
4. Spirited Away
5. All About Lily Chou-Chou
6. Kaza-hana
7. Eureka
8. Crayon Shin-chan: The Storm Called: The Adult Empire Strikes Back
9. Quartet for Two
10. Koko ni Iru Koto, Off-Balance, Turn
