= Angel's Egg (disambiguation) =

Angel's Egg is a Japanese original video animation by Mamoru Oshii and Yoshitaka Amano.

Angel's Egg may also refer to:

- Angel's Egg (album), a 1973 album by Gong
- The Angel's Egg, a 1993 novel by Yuka Murayama
  - The Angel's Egg, a 2006 Japanese film directed by Shin Togashi
