= 11th Japan Film Professional Awards =

Japanese film awards in 2002

- Date: April 6, 2002
- Site: Shin-Bungeiza, Tokyo, Japan

The 11th Japan Film Professional Awards (第11回日本映画プロフェッショナル大賞) is the 11th edition of the Japan Film Professional Awards. It awarded the best of 2001 in film. The ceremony took place on April 6, 2002 at Shin-Bungeiza in Tokyo.

== Awards ==
- Best Film: Ichi the Killer
- Best Director: Takashi Miike (Ichi the Killer, Visitor Q, The Guys from Paradise)
- Best Actress: Kumiko Asō (Pulse, Zeitaku na Hone, 0cm4)
- Best Actor: Susumu Terajima (Sora no Ana, Misuzu)
- Best New Encouragement: Aoi Miyazaki (Eureka)
- Best New Director: Shin Togashi (Off-Balance)
- Special: Satoshi Tsumabuki & boys (Waterboys)

== 10 best films ==
1. Ichi the Killer (Takashi Miike)
2. Eureka (Shinji Aoyama)
3. Pulse (Kiyoshi Kurosawa)
4. All About Lily Chou-Chou (Shunji Iwai)
5. Kazahana (Shinji Sōmai)
6. Pistol Opera (Seijun Suzuki)
7. Off-Balance (Shin Togashi)
8. Waterboys (Shinobu Yaguchi)
9. Visitor Q (Takashi Miike)
10. Tokyo X Erotica (Takahisa Zeze)
10. Not Forgotten (Makoto Shinozaki)
