= Tetsujin 28-go =

Japanese manga series and its adaptations

- Tetsujin 28

鉄人28号 (Tetsujin Nijūhachi-gō)
- Genre: Mecha, dieselpunk
- Manga
- Written by: Mitsuteru Yokoyama
- Published by: Kobunsha
- Magazine: Shōnen
- Original run: July 1956 – May 1966
- Volumes: 24
- Television drama
- Directed by: Santaro Marune
- Studio: Matsuzaki Production
- Original network: NTV
- Original run: February 1, 1960 – April 25, 1960
- Episodes: 13
- Anime television series

Tetsujin 28 FX
- Directed by: Tetsuo Imazawa
- Produced by: Jin Totani; Mikihiro Iwata; Toru Horikoshi; Yuko Sagawa
- Written by: Hideki Sonoda
- Music by: Hiroaki Kondo
- Studio: Tokyo Movie Shinsha
- Licensed by: NA: Discotek Media
- Original network: NNS (NTV)
- Original run: April 5, 1992 – March 30, 1993
- Episodes: 47
- Anime television series

Tetsujin 28 Gao!
- Directed by: Tatsuji Yamazaki
- Produced by: Shotaro Muroji; Daisuke Hara
- Written by: Mitsutaka Hirota; Tatsuji Yamazaki
- Music by: Futoshi Sato
- Studio: Eiken
- Original network: FNS (Fuji TV)
- Original run: April 6, 2013 – March 26, 2016
- Episodes: 151
- Manga
- Written by: Atsushi Oba
- Published by: Shueisha
- Magazine: Saikyō Jump
- Original run: June 2013 – August 2014
- Anime television series
- Gigantor (1963); The New Adventures of Gigantor (1980); Tetsujin 28 (2004)
- Live-action film
- Tetsujin 28: The Movie (2005)

Tetsujin 28-gō (Japanese: 鉄人28号, Hepburn: Tetsujin Nijūhachi-gō; lit. "Iron Man No. 28"), known as simply Tetsujin 28 in international releases, is a 1956 manga written and illustrated by Mitsuteru Yokoyama, who would also create Giant Robo. The series centers on the adventures of a young boy named Shotaro Kaneda, who controls a giant robot named "Tetsujin 28", built by his late father.

The manga was later adapted into four anime television series, a Japanese television drama and two films, one live action and one animated. Released in 1963, the series was among the first Japanese anime series to feature a giant robot. It was later released in the United States as Gigantor. A live-action movie with heavy use of CGI was produced in Japan in 2005.

The series is credited with featuring the first humanoid giant robot controlled externally via remote control by an operator, making Tetsujin 28-go the first to popularize the mecha genre in Japan, prior to Mazinger Z in 1972.

== Plot ==
In the final phase of the Pacific War during World War II, the Imperial Japanese Army were working on a top-secret project involving the development of the "Tetsujin" (鉄人, Tetsujin; lit. "Iron Man") line of gigantic war-machines as the secret weapon to fight against the invading Allied forces. However, the fall of the Third Reich and Japan's unconditional surrender following the bombing of Hiroshima and Nagasaki causes the Tetsujin project to be mothballed and hidden away in specialized bunkers, fearing that such power could destroy the world at the wrong hands.

Fortunately, Dr. Kaneda, one of the developers behind the Tetsujin project, created "Tetsujin 28", the 28th and last of the Tetsujin war-machines, its remote controller was passed on years later to his 10-year-old son, Shotaro Kaneda. With his analytical prowess as a young boy detective, and with the assistance from his many allies, Shotaro takes control of Tetsujin 28 as he and his trusted robot combat against various crimes, even taking on other robots as powerful as Tetsujin 28.

== Characters ==
Shotaro Kaneda (金田 正太郎, Kaneda Shōtarō)
The ten-year-old son of Dr. Kaneda. He is Tetsujin's assigned controller, with a deep emotional attachment to the robot. Shotaro is a boy detective famous throughout Tokyo, and in the manga, 1963 series, and 2004 series, can be seen frequently driving a car.
Professor Shikishima (敷島 博士, Shikishima-hakase)
Dr. Kaneda's assistant, later Shotaro's mentor and guardian. He is caring and very dedicated to his work, but usually looks serious and deadpan. He is married, and has a son named Tetsuo.
Inspector Ootsuka (大塚 署長, Ōtsuka-shochō)
The Chief of Tokyo Police. He is warm in personality and very enthusiastic, which isn't to say he doesn't take his job seriously. He is very close to Shikishima and also takes care of Shotaro, even acting as a surrogate father in the 2004 series.
Kenji Murasame (村雨 健次, Murasame Kenji)
A former intelligence officer who begins to help Otsuka and Shotaro's work. His appearances in the 1960s and 2004 series are starkly different; he is immediately Shotaro's ally in the 1960s, but in the 2004 series, his brothers Ryūsaku and Tatsu are killed during Tetsujin's revival, causing him to seek revenge for several episodes. In the original manga, he and Ryūsaku are the leaders of a criminal organization.
Professor Shutain Franken (不乱拳酒多飲 博士, Furanken Shutain-hakase)
A reclusive mad scientist who created the robot Black Ox. He is calm and very knowledgeable, but unfortunately uses his talents to create dangerous robots. In the original version of the 1960s series, his name is Dr. Black Dog.
Superhuman Kelly (超人間 ケリー, Chōningen Kerī)
An American man who volunteered himself to be turned into an android as part of a wartime experiment. As a result, his body is entirely robotic with the exception of his brain, and is often covered in bandages. In the 2004 series, he steals his brother Johnson's identity in order to kill the doctor that made him this way.

== Production ==
Yokoyama's Tetsujin, much like Osamu Tezuka's Astro Boy, was influenced by the artist's wartime experiences. In Yokoyama's case, this was through the bombing of Kobe in World War II.

As he had written in Ushio magazine in 1995, "When I was a fifth-grader, the war ended and I returned home from Tottori Prefecture, where I had been evacuated. The city of Kobe had been totally flattened, reduced to ashes. People said it was because of the B-29 bombers...as a child, I was astonished by their terrifying, destructive power." Another influence on Tetsujin's creation was the Vergeltungswaffen, a set of wonder weapons designed for long-range strategic bombing during World War II, and the idea that Nazi Germany possessed an "ace in the hole to reverse [its] waning fortunes". The third work to inspire Yokoyama's creation was the 1931 film Frankenstein, which shaped Yokoyama's belief that the monster itself is neither good or evil.

== Release ==
Tetsujin 28-go was serialized in Kobunsha's Shōnen magazine from July 1956 to May 1966, for a total of 97 chapters. The series was collected into 12 tankōbon volumes, which are re-released every ten years.

== Adaptations ==
=== 1963 television series ===
The 1963 television incarnation of Tetsujin 28-go aired on Fuji TV from 20 October 1963 to 25 May 1966. The series initially ended with 84 episodes, but then returned for 13 more, for a total of 97 episodes. The series had mostly short plots that never took up more than three episodes, but was generally more light-hearted than the anime that would succeed it. Shotaro, Otsuka, Shikishima and Murasame functioned as a team in this version.

In North America, due to the Marvel Comics character Iron Man appearing in that market before Tetsujin 28-go (which literally means "Iron Man No. 28"), the series was renamed Gigantor for the American version. The dub was done by Fred Ladd, all of the character names were changed, and the wartime setting removed. Shotaro Kaneda became Jimmy Sparks, Dr. Shikishima became Dr. Bob Brilliant, Inspector Otsuka became Inspector Ignatz J. Blooper, and Kenji Murasame became Dick Strong. The series' setting was pushed forward to the year 2000. Only 52 of the 97 episodes were ever dubbed in English.

=== 1980 television series ===
The 1980-81 New Tetsujin 28 series was created with 51 color episodes based on a modernized take upon the original concept art. In 1993, Fred Ladd and the TMS animation studio converted the series into The New Adventures of Gigantor and had it broadcast on America's Sci-Fi Channel from September 9, 1993, to June 30, 1997.

=== Tetsujin 28 FX ===
Chō Dendō Robo Tetsujin 28-go FX is a sequel to Tetsujin 28-go directed by Tetsuo Imazawa and produced at the Tokyo Movie Shinsha studio. It ran on Nippon Television from April 5, 1992, to March 30, 1993, totaling 47 episodes. It has been brought over to Latin America, but never released in English-speaking countries.

The show follows Shotaro's son, Masato, who controls a new edition of Tetsujin and works at a detective agency with other children. Among them are Shiori Nishina, granddaughter of Chief Otsuka. The Tetsujin FX (Iron Hero 28 Future X) is controlled by a remote control gun, which has to be aimed at the robot for it to take commands.

Cast

- Yūsuke Numata as Masato Kaneda
- Hideyuki Tanaka as Shotaro Kaneda (adult)
- Ai Orikasa as Shotaro Kaneda (child)
- Ai Orikasa as Yoko Kaneda
- Fumihiko Tachiki as Ken'ichi Tsukasa
- Etsuko Kozakura as Futaba Mitsue
- Takeshi Kusao as Saburo Natsuki
- Akiko Hiramatsu as Shiori Nishina

=== 2004 television series ===
Written and directed by Yasuhiro Imagawa, the 2004 remake takes place ten years after World War II, approximately the same time as the manga debuted. The new television series has been released in the United States under its original name Tetsujin-28 by Geneon and in the United Kingdom by Manga Entertainment, the first time a Tetsujin-28 property has not been localized to "Gigantor" in America or other English speaking nations. The television series focused mainly on Shotaro's pursuit to control and fully understand Tetsujin's capabilities, all the while encountering previous creations and scientists from the Tetsujin Project. While not fully based on the original manga, it followed an extremely different storyline than in the 1960s series.

On July 1, 2004, a video game was released for the PlayStation 2 developed by Sandlot and published by Bandai. The game uses the same voice actors as the animation, though it takes presentation cues from the anime, the manga, as well as the kaiju film genre.

On March 31, 2007, a feature-length film, entitled "Tetsujin 28-go: Hakuchu no Zangetsu" (which translates as "Tetsujin #28: The Daytime Moon") was released in Japanese theaters. The film used the same character designs and scenery as the 2004 television series, albeit the film remade the series from the beginning. Among the changes, a new character "Shoutarou" debuted, Shotaro's older half-brother who was in the same airforce troop as Ryūsaku Murasame. Also a character named Tsuki, with a heavily bandaged body, attempts to murder Shotaro.

=== 2005 live-action film ===
A live-action adaptation of the series, directed by Shin Togashi, was released in Japan on March 19, 2005. It was later released on DVD in the US by Geneon Entertainment and by Manga Entertainment in the UK. The film centers on Shotaro (Sosuke Ikematsu), who is living in the modern age with his widowed mother. He discovers Tetsujin 28, a giant robot left for him by his father (Hiroshi Abe). With the help of Chief Otsuka and classmate Mami Tachibana, Shotaro learns to control Tetsujin and does battle with the villainous Dr. Reiji Takumi and Black Ox.

=== Cancelled films ===
On December 26, 2008, Felix Ip, the creative director of Imagi Animation Studios, revealed screenshots from a computer-animated teaser trailer featuring Tetsujin and Black Ox. On January 9, 2009, the Japanese animation company Hikari Productions and Imagi launched the projects website, as well as the full teaser featuring Shotaro and Dr. Franken. The film was subsequently cancelled, along with several other projects, when Imagi went defunct in 2010.

Idlewild director Bryan Barber reportedly acquired the rights to Gigantor in 2011, with plans to adapt it into a feature film. The project never came to fruition, however, and no further developments have been made since.

== Legacy ==
- The shotacon genre of Japanese fiction, which focuses on a sexual attraction to young boys, is said to be linked to Tetsujin 28-go's Shotaro as an early example of the archetypal boys the genre focuses on; indeed, the term "shotacon" is said to be short for "Shotaro Complex".
- Guillermo del Toro has cited the series as an influence on his movie Pacific Rim, depicting a series of battles between human-controlled giant robots and giant alien monsters.
- Shotaro's name was borrowed by Katsuhiro Otomo for the protagonist of his manga, Akira. He also borrowed the name Shikishima for the colonel and the name of Shikishima's son, Tetsuo, for the character Tetsuo Shima; he has stated in the Akira Club book that it could be said that Akira is based on Tetsujin 28-go (Akira himself is referred to as "No. 28" by the scientists experimenting on the espers).
- The U.S. edition of the show, Gigantor, was spoofed in Saturday Night Live's "Torboto" sketch.
