= Tetsujin 28-go (1963 TV series) =

1960s Japanese animated TV show featuring a giant robot

- Gigantor
- Gigantor Part 1 DVD

鉄人28号 (Tetsujin Nijūhachi-gō)
- Genre: Action, Adventure, Dieselpunk, Mecha, Crime Fiction, Children's anime, Sci-Fi
- Anime television series
- Directed by: Yonehiko Watanabe
- Produced by: Kazuo Iohara
- Written by: Kinzo Okamoto
- Music by: Toriro Miki; Nobuyoshi Koshibe; Hidehiko Arashino
- Studio: TCJ
- Licensed by: AUS: Siren Visual (former) Madman Entertainment (2010–present); NA: Delphi Associates (former) Trans-Lux Television (former) The Right Stuf (2009–2023) Crunchyroll, LLC (2023-present); NZ: Siren Visual (former) Madman Entertainment (2010–present)
- Original network: Fuji TV
- English network: AU: ATV-0 (1968) TEN-10 (1968) SAS-10 (1968–1969); US: Syndication (original run) Adult Swim (2005–2007)
- Original run: October 20, 1963 – May 25, 1966
- Episodes: 97 (original version); 52 (English dub)

Tetsujin 28-go (Japanese: 鉄人28号, Hepburn: Tetsujin Nijūhachi-gō; lit. "Iron Man No. 28") also known as Gigantor in the United States, is a 1963 anime adaptation of Tetsujin 28-go, a manga by Mitsuteru Yokoyama released in 1956. It debuted on US television in January 1966. As with Speed Racer, the characters' original names were altered and the original series' violence was toned down for American viewers. The dub was created by Fred Ladd distributed in the US by Peter Rodgers Organization.

A new series was produced in Japan in 1980 and was later shown as The New Adventures of Gigantor, on the Sci Fi Channel from 1993 to 1997.

== Plot ==
Gigantor is set in the then distant year of 2000. The show follows the exploits of Jimmy Sparks, a 12-year-old boy who controls Gigantor, a huge flying robot, with a remote control. The robot is made of steel and has a rocket-powered backpack for flight, a pointy nose, eyes that never move and incredible strength, but no intelligence (although he started to tap his head as if trying to think in one episode). Whoever has the remote control controls Gigantor.

Originally developed as a weapon by Jimmy's father, Gigantor was later reprogrammed to act as a guardian of peace. Jimmy Sparks lives with his uncle, Dr. Bob Brilliant, on a remote island. Jimmy usually wears shorts and a jacket, carries a firearm and occasionally drives a car. Together, Jimmy and Gigantor battle crime around the world and clash with the many villains who are always trying to steal or undermine the giant robot.

== History ==
In 1963, Fred Ladd, while working on the animated feature Pinocchio in Outer Space and on the animated TV series The Big World of Little Adam had seen artwork of Mitsuteru Yokoyama presenting a giant robot remote-controlled by a young boy. The Tokyo-based artist had designed the robot for a Japanese shōnen manga series Tetsujin-28 and later a black-and-white animated TV series called Tetsujin 28-go.

Ladd, who had produced the successful international English-language adaptation of Astro Boy, joined with Al Singer to form a corporation called Delphi Associates, Inc. to produce and distribute an English-language version of Tetsujin 28-gō. They took only 52 episodes of the black-and-white Japanese series for the American market and renamed the series Gigantor. Peter Fernandez wrote much of the English script and participated in the dubbing. Delphi then sub-licensed worldwide distribution rights to Trans-Lux Television. The series became an immediate hit with juvenile audiences, though adult reactions were sometimes hostile.

Despite the fact that the Tetsujin 28-go manga (which debuted in 1956) predates the Marvel Comics character Iron Man (who debuted in 1963), Tetsujin 28-go (which literally means "Iron Man No. 28") could not be released as Iron Man in North America due to the Marvel character Iron Man appearing in that market before Tetsujin debuted there, so the series was renamed Gigantor for the American version.

Gigantor premiered in the United States in syndication in January 1966. It was playing at 7:00 p.m. on New York's WPIX-TV when Variety gave it a particularly scathing review, calling it a "loud, violent, tasteless and cheerless cartoon" which was "strictly in the retarded babysitter class". The reviewer added that Gigantor was popular; he said, "Ratings so far are reportedly good, but strictly pity the tikes and their misguided folks."

Gigantor became a popular Japanese export during this time. The series was shown in Australia on Melbourne television in January 1968 through Trans-Lux, on ATV-0 at 5:00 pm. It was described by the TV Week as an "animated science fiction series about the world's mightiest robot, and 12-year-old Jimmy Sparks who controls the jet-propelled giant". The series aired in other markets around Australia, including Sydney on TEN-10, and in Adelaide, South Australia on SAS-10, (its debut on Monday October 28, 1968, at 5.55 pm). It was also screened in New Zealand around the same time.

Gigantor was one of a number of Japanese TV series that enjoyed strong popularity with young viewers in Australia during the 1960s. The first and undoubtedly the most successful of these was the hugely successful live-action historical adventure series The Samurai, the first Japanese TV series ever screened in Australia, which premiered in late 1964. It was followed by a contemporary ninja-based live action espionage series, Phantom Agents, and a number of popular Japanese animated series including Astro Boy, Ken The Wolf Boy, Prince Planet and Marine Boy.

In July 1994, Fox Family Films, a division of 20th Century Fox, acquired the rights to "Gigantor" for a live-action motion picture. Anticipating that Gigantor would become a franchise for the studio, Fox tapped screenwriters Steve Meerson and Peter Krikes to prepare the script and budgeted between $35 million and $50 million for the film. Executive producers Fred Ladd and Aeiji Katayama indicated that Mitsuteru Yokoyama would get an executive producer credit and that the 50-foot robot would be updated and modernized for the 1990s with a 12-foot height and morphed and computer-generated features. However, the project has yet to come to fruition and Mitsuteru Yokoyama has since died.

== Characters ==
Whimsical English names were given to the show's characters, such as "Dick Strong", a secret agent; a funny policeman named "Inspector Blooper"; and enemies, such as, "The Spider", "Dubble Trubble", and "Dr. Katzmeow". Other characters included Bob Brilliant's teenage son, Button, as well as his housekeeper, Lotus.

Jimmy Spark's voice was that of Billie Lou Watt. The voice of Inspector Blooper was that of Ray Owens. Old time radio listeners might find the Inspector Blooper sounds a lot like the Willard Waterman/Harold Peary-voiced character "The Great Gildersleeve". Gilbert Mack voiced Dick Strong. Peter Fernandez provided the voices of other Gigantor characters.

== Episodes ==
Below is the list of the English dubbed episodes.

No.	Title
1	"Struggle at the South Pole"
2	"Battle at the Bottom of the World"
3	"Sting of the Spider"
4	"Return of the Spider"
5	"Spider's Revenge"
6	"The Secret Valley"
7	"The Diamond Smugglers"
8	"Dangerous Doctor Diamond"
9	"Force of Terror"
10	"World in Danger"
11	"Badge of Danger"
12	"The Smoke Robots"
13	"The Freezer Ray"
14	"The Magic Multiplier"
15	"The Submarine Base"
16	"Treasure Mountain"
17	"The Mystery Missile"
18	"The Giant Cobra"
19	"The Great Hunt"
20	"The Deadly Web"
21	"The Atomic Flame"
22	"The Incredible Speed Machine"
23	"The Monster Magnet"
24	"Target: Jupiter"
25	"Trap at 20 Fathoms"
26	"Monsters from the Deep"
27	"Will the Real Gigantor Stand Up?"
28	"Ten Thousand Gigantors"
29	"The Plot to Seize Gigantor"
30	"The Space Submarine"
31	"Gigantor Who?"
32	"The Robot Olympics"
33	"The Crossbones Caper"
34	"Ransom at Point X"
35	"The Gypsy Spaceship"
36	"The Space Cats"
37	"Return of Magnaman"
38	"Vanishing Mountain"
39	"The Insect Monsters"
40	"The City Smashers"
41	"The Robot Firebird"
42	"Magnaman of Outer Space"
43	"The Robot Albatross"
44	"Battle of the Robot Giants"
45	"The Deadly Sting Rays"
46	"Gigantor and the Desert Fire"
47	"The Atomic Whale"
48	"The Secret Formula Robbery"
49	"The Evil Robot Brain"
50	"The Devil Gantry"
51	"The Robot Arsenal"
52	"Danger's Dinosaurs"

== Sequels and spin-offs ==
The 1980–81 New Iron Man #28 (Shin Tetsujin-nijuhachi-go) series was created with 51 episodes based on a modernized take upon the original concept art. In 1993, Ladd and the TMS animation studio converted the series into The New Adventures of Gigantor and broadcast it on America's Sci-Fi Channel from September 9, 1993, to June 30, 1997.

During this time, the series was shown on Spanish television under the name Iron-Man 28.

There was also a sequel series, Tetsujin 28 FX, about the son of the original controller operating a new robot (with his father and the original FX-less No. 28 appearing from time to time to help), which ran in Japan in 1992.

In 2004, a new Tetsujin 28-go series was made which returned to the original story established by the manga and original anime series. This version was released in the United States on DVD under the original Japanese title of Tetsujin 28. Unlike Gigantor, however, the English translation of this series is closer to the original Japanese version, with all Japanese names retained.

A number of characters and robots from the Tetsujin 28 series appeared (albeit with altered backgrounds) in Giant Robo: The Animation, an OAV series that drew on Mitsuteru Yokoyama's entire body of work. In one of the Giant Robo parodic spin-off OAVs, "Mighty GinRei" (Tetsuwan GinRei), a version of the original Tetsujin appears under the name "Jintetsu".

A comic version of Gigantor ran in the Triple Action anthology series from Eternity Comics from issues #1–4.

An American-made Gigantor comic book series was released in 2000 by Antarctic Press. The comic lasted for 12 issues and was later collected in 2005 in trade paperback form. The comic used elements from the anime Giant Robo as well as Marvel Comics references, though the later issues became closer to the original animation.

The creators of Gigantor have unveiled plans for another updated design, a "Gigantor for the New Millennium." This newest form of the giant robot is called G3 and differs from past designs. The new Gigantor is a meld of robot and cyborg. According to the main site: "Driven by a complex neuro-system of DNA-impregnated neurochips, Gigantor G3 is a living Cybot!".

== Theme song and miscellany ==
- The title song "Gigantor" was written by Louis C. Singer and Eugene Raskin. A cover version, performed by The Dickies, reached #72 in the U.K in 1982. It can be also found on their re-release of Dawn of the Dickies 2000 Captain Oi! Records A cover version of the theme song "Gigantor", performed by Helmet, is included on the 1995 tribute album Saturday Morning: Cartoons' Greatest Hits, produced by Ralph Sall for MCA Records. The Australian Japanese punk band Mach Pelican also released a cover of the song on their 1999 self-titled album.
- The Gigantor theme is parodied in the Pinky, Elmyra & the Brain episode "How I Spent My Weekend".
- The Gigantour music festival, created by Megadeth frontman Dave Mustaine, is named after Gigantor.
- MC Esoteric's 2008 release Esoteric vs. Japan – Pterodactyl Takes Tokyo extensively samples both the theme song and various episodes.
- In the film Night at the Museum and its sequel, Jedediah calls Larry Daley "Gigantor".
- In the film Speed, a man on the bus refers to another man on the bus as "Gigantor".
- Styles of Beyond sampled the original theme song for the hidden track "Gigantor" from the album Megadef.
- The series was parodied as Torboto in a 2007 Saturday Night Live TV Funhouse sketch.

== See also ==
- The Iron Giant
