= Super Robot - Suffer Reboot =

- Artist: Toym Leon Imao
- Year: 2014-2016
- Type: Sculpture
- Medium: Fiberglass, brass, galvanized iron
- Subject: Mecha, Martial law under Ferdinand Marcos
- Location: Quezon City

Super Robot - Suffer Reboot is the name given to a series of three sculptures by Filipino artist Toym Leon Imao. The sculptures, made from 2014 to 2016, are each inspired by a specific Japanese mecha animated television series which were popular in the Philippines in the 1970s.

== Sculptures ==
Super Robot - Suffer Reboot is the collective name for three separate sculptures. The names of each sculpture are alliterations. All of them were first exhibited at the steps of the Palma Hall at the University of the Philippines Diliman.

Super Robot - Suffer Reboot sculptures
Sculpture	Based on	Date of creation	Ref.
Last, Lost, Lust for Four Forgotten Episodes	Voltes V (Chōdenji Machine Voltes V)	September 2014.	
Coping with a Couple's Copious Cupboard of Curios, Cops, Cuffs and Corpses	Mazinger Z	July 2015	
The Fright to Fight or Flight with Freights of Plights	Daimos (Tōshō Daimos)	February 2016	

== Symbolism ==
The sculptures were made to symbolize the sufferings and injustices experienced by Filipinos, with an emphasis towards the time of martial law during Ferdinand Marcos' presidency, when many Japanese mecha animated series became popular among Filipino children. By 1979, Marcos banned every mecha series considered to have violent content inappropriate for children. Imao, who used to watch Voltes V and other mecha series, made the sculptures to symbolize his anger when those series' broadcasts were halted by Marcos: "At first it was only because he deprived me of a favorite TV character. And then a sort of political awakening happened. Suddenly, I was affected by what grownups were talking about: Martial law."
