= Tadao Nagahama =

Japanese anime director

- 長浜忠夫
- Born: 26 September 1932; Kagoshima, Kagoshima Prefecture, Japan
- Died: 4 November 1980 (aged 48)
- Occupations: Animation director; stage director
- Years active: 1963–1980
- Employer: A Production (1963–1974)
- Notable work: Combattler V; Fighting General Daimos; Star of the Giants; Voltes V

Tadao Nagahama (長浜 忠夫, Nagahama Tadao; September 26, 1932 – November 4, 1980 in Kagoshima) was a Japanese director of anime and puppet shows. He also wrote the lyrics for the anime's theme song under the name Akira Aoi (あおい あきら, Aoi Akira).

Nagahama has produced hits in a wide variety of genres, including super robot, sports, and comedy. He is best known as the director of Sunrise and Toei's Robot Romance Trilogy, which added human drama to the Super Robot genre. He is also known as the director of several popular anime series that are still well known among Japanese viewers. His most famous work is the national hit, (Note: The TV ratings consistently hovered around 20%, with the highest rating of 36.7%, and the show was popular for its long broadcast period of about three and a half years.) Star of the Giants, which contributed to the popularity of baseball in Japan.

== Biography ==
Nagahama began his theatrical career in the drama club of his junior high school, and not only directed but also acted on stage himself. After entering the Department of Drama at Nihon University College of Art, he studied theater at Butai Geijyutsu Gakuin, Kirin-za, Seinen Haiyū Club, and Mingei Theatre Company, while working part-time in the editorial department of theater magazine Theaterux.

In the early 1960s, while working in the production department of the puppet theater troupe Hitomi-za, he was assigned to direct puppet shows for television.

In 1965, he joined A Production, which was contracted to produce anime for Tokyo Movie, an animation studio founded by Yutaka Fujioka, a colleague at Hitomi-za and producer of the TV puppet show Iga no Kagemaru, where he began directing TV anime. The TV series he directed, Star of Giants, which began airing in 1968, was a huge hit and raged at the time. However, he gave up on anime after working on Samurai Giants and left A Production to start a company, where he worked on commercial production for about a year.

In 1975, he returned to the anime industry as the director of Reideen The Brave, replacing Yoshiyuki Tomino, who was dropped midway through the show. This was his first robot anime.

In 1976, he took on the job of director for Toei (not Toei Animation)'s robot anime, Combattler V and was involved from the planning stage with the Raiden staff. From this work, he began teaching acting to voice actors and handling sound effects, which led to his being credited as sound director. He went on to direct two more Toei's robot anime, Voltes V and Tōshō Daimos. These three works later became known as the Robot Romance Trilogy. Voltes V, in particular, became so popular in the Philippines that after more than 45 years, a live-action remake of the TV series was produced by the Philippines' largest terrestrial television station in 2023. In Daimos, Toei's Sword Fight Arranger directed the action at the suggestion of Toei's producer, and Nagahama had animators draw action scenes based on a video of his movements. Meanwhile, the same producer brought anime elements from these works to Toei's live-action tokusatsu productions, including giant robots made of multiple mechas combined into one, beautiful enemy characters and anime-style designs. (Note: He recruited designer Yutaka Izubuchi, who Nagahama led into the anime industry, to design Tokusatsu's monsters and character costumes.)

In 1979, he directed Future Robot Daltanious, which was produced under the same structure as the previous three works, albeit with a different broadcaster. However, he left the show midway through to direct The Rose of Versailles at his old home, Tokyo Movies. However, he dropped out of that show as well due to a conflict with a voice actor over a difference in acting policy.

During the production of the joint anime between Japan and France, Ulysses 31, he contracted fulminant hepatitis and died suddenly from the disease at the age of 43. (Note: His wife developed the disease a little later than him but survived.)

== Filmography ==
=== Puppetry ===
- Iga no Kagemaru (1963-1964) Episode director
- Hyokkori Hyōtanjima (1964–1969) Puppet performance director
- Terrahawks (Japan-UK co-production) (canceled (Note: This was a joint project between Japan and the UK that was cancelled for various reasons. The British side then proceeded with the project without Japan, and a puppet show with the same title was broadcast in the U.K. in 1983.))

=== Anime ===
- Obake no Q-tarō (1965) Episode director/Storyboard
- Perman (1967-1968)
- Star of the Giants (1968-1971) Composition (Note: De facto director.) (episodes 1-85) → Episode director (episodes 86-final episode)
- Chingō Muchabē (1971) Episode director
- Shin Obake no Q-tarō (1971-1972) Director/Script
- The Gutsy Frog (1972-1974) Episode Director (9th-80th), Chief Director (81st-final), Storyboard
- Samurai Giants (1973-1974) Director
- Brave Raideen (1975-1976) General Director (Episode 27-Final episode (Note: He took over Yoshiyuki Tomino.))/Storyboard
- Combattler V (1976-1977) General director/Sound director
- Voltes V (1977-1978) General director/Sound director/Voice actor (Note: He made a cameo appearance (non-credit) in the final episode as the computer voice of the guardian Godl.)
- Ore wa Teppei (1977-1978) Episode director (Note: De facto director of the first half of the series.)
- Tōshō Daimos (1978-1979) General director/Sound director
- Future Robot Daltanious (1979-1980) General director/Sound director (Episodes 1-26 (Note: He dropped out midway through the series, and Katsushi Sasaki replaced him. However, from episodes 28 to 33, he is involved in the role of script supervisor.))
- The Rose of Versailles (1979-1980) General director/Sound director (Episodes 1-13 (Note: He dropped out midway through the series, and Osamu Dezaki succeeded him as chief director.))
- Zukkoke Knight - Don De La Mancha (anime adaptation of Don Quixote) (1980)
- Ulysses 31 (Japan-France co-production) (1981) Chief director on the Japanese side, his last work (Note: He suddenly passed away due to disease when the first episode was completed.)

== Music ==
=== Lyrics ===
- Voltes V Ending theme
- Tōshō Daimos Ending theme
- Future Robot Daltanious Ending theme

== Sources ==
- Iwasa, Yoichi, ed. (July 15, 2003). Combatler V/Voltes V/Daimos/Daltanious Complete Work - Tadao Nagahama Romance Robot Anime World. Futabasha. ISBN 4-5752-9575-2.
