= Future Robot Daltanious =

Japanese anime television series

- Future Robot Daltanious cover released by Discotek.
- 未来ロボ ダルタニアス
- Genre: Mecha
- Creator: Saburō Yatsude
- Director: Katsutoshi Sasaki
- Character designers: Yuki Hijiri (original); Akihiro Kanayama (original/animation)
- Music: Hiroshi Tsutsui
- Country of origin: Japan
- Original language: Japanese
- No. of episodes: 47

Production
- Studio: Nippon Sunrise
- Producers: Hyota Ezu (Tokyo Channel 12); Takashi Iijima (Toei); Takayuki Suzuki (Toei)
- Production companies: Tokyo Channel 12; Toei Company; Toei Advertising

Original release
- Network: Tokyo Channel 12
- Release: March 21, 1979 – March 5, 1980

Future Robot Daltanious (未来ロボ ダルタニアス, Mirai Robo Darutaniasu) is an anime television series which aired on Tokyo Channel 12 from March 21, 1979, to March 5, 1980. Produced by Toei Company and animated by Nippon Sunrise, consisting of 47 episodes.

== Plot ==
In 1995, Earth has been conquered by the Zaar Empire from the planet Akron in the star system of Zaar. All Earth's cities have been destroyed by the alien invasion, and humanity's survivors live in shanty towns and villages. Kento, a war orphan, and his companions hide in a cave to escape the villagers from whom they stole food.

In the cave, they find the secret base of Doctor Earl from the planet Helios, another planet conquered by the Zaar. Doctor Earl had fled to Earth, bringing with him the greatest achievement of Helian technology: the super-robot Atlaus, whose power increases in combination with the intelligent lion robot Beralios. When the robots combine with the Helian fighter Gunper, they form the mighty robot Daltanious. Doctor Earl entrusts the fight for Earth to Kento, a descendant of the Helian royal family.

== Voice actors ==
Character	Voice actor
Kento Tate	Toshio Furukawa
Sanae Shiratori	Keiko Han
Tanosuke Hata	Tomomichi Nishimura
Danji Hiiragi	Yoshito Yasuhara
Manabu	You Inoue
Ochame	Yūko Mita

== Production ==
Crew	Crew members
Director	Katsusoshi Sasaki
Assistant directors	Norio Kashima; Akira Suzuki
Screenwriters	Fuyunori Gobu; Masaki Tsuji
Character design	Yuki Hijiri; Akihiro Kanayama
Mechanical design	Submarine
Music	Hiroshi Tsutsui
Original creator	Saburo Yatsude

== Concept ==
Tadao Nagahama influenced the series' artistry and direction, and its style resembles those of Voltes V and Combattler V.

The super robot Daltanious was formed from three components: Atlaus (the main robot), Gunper (the spaceship) and Beralios, the mechanical lion who was recovered after the first battle with Akron. The robot is named after D'Artagnan, the hero of The Three Musketeers. Daltanious is 56 metres (184 ft) tall and weighs 678 short tons (615,000 kg). Daltanious was the first combining super-robot with an animal component and the first with a lion's head on its chest. The lion's head motif would be incorporated into several Brave series robots, including GaoGaiGar.

== Toys ==
Like all Super Robot anime titles, Daltanious had a die-cast toy replica produced by Popy during its run. In 2011, a Daltanious toy was released by Bandai in their Soul of Chogokin line.

== Weapons ==
- Tran Saber (トランセイバー, Toran Seibā)
  A single handed sword is summoned by the disk on Daltanious' right hip.
- Tran Shield (トランシールド, Toran Shīrudo)
  A metal shield is summoned by the disk on Daltanious' left hip.
- Double Knuckle (ダブルナックル, Daburu Nakkuru)
  Daltanious' punches are launched like rockets against opponents.
- Gyro Spinner (ジャイロスピンナー, Jairo Supinnā)
  Metal blades appear from the golden metal rings on Daltanious' forearms, and can be launched or combined with the Double Knuckle.
- Lysander (ライサンダー, Raisandā)
  A crossbow appears on Daltanious' right forearm, which shoots metal arrows.
- Sigma Beam (シグマビーム, Shiguma Bīmu)
  From the four crosses on Daltanious' shoulders and knees, four purple beams combine to form a cross-shaped laser beam.
- Super Electromagnetic Eraser (超電磁イレーサー, Chōdenji Irēsā)
  From the Beralios' mouth, a ball of fire is shot against opponents.
- Kaenken: Cross Slash - Flaming Sword: Cross Slash (火炎剣・火炎十文字斬り, Kaenken: Kaen jū moji kiri)
  From Beralios' mouth or eyes, a flamberge is summoned for Daltanious to attack.
- Cannon Cubic (キャノンキュービック, Kyanon Kyūbikku)
  From Daltanious' arms, a double pair of cannons fire repeated shots.
- Chain Slicer (チェーンスライサー, Chēn Suraisā)
  From the right metal disk on Daltanious' right hip, a chain with a hook and sickle is summoned to grab opponents.
- Kaenken: Flame Attack - Flaming Sword: Flame Attack (火炎アタック, Kaen Atakku)
  When the Flaming Sword is summoned, a flaming beam stops opponents and Daltanious performs the Cross Slash.
- Kaenken: Full Power (火炎剣・フルパワー, Furu Powa)
  The Flame Sword is summoned with Daltanius' available power. He glows and flame appears above the sword, from which a larger Flame Sword is drawn.

== Zaar Forces ==
=== Bemborgs ===
- Daranche
  Its powers include flight, sickle arms and face tentacles.
- Gofun
  Its powers include a statue disguise, a cutlass and eye lasers.
- Garnis
  Its powers include swimming, flight and electric hair.
- Gogondoru
  Its powers include flight, two missiles in each foot and mouth wind gusts.
- Gerzom
  Its powers include flight, green antennae energy bolts and torso energy beams.
- Gagan Parasite form
  Its powers include energy absorbing mouth webs and eye electric lasers.
- Gagan Bemborg form
  Its powers include eye lasers, flight and sonic waves from the wings.
- Utsuboras
  Its powers include flight, limb retraction and head spikes.
- Gaigar
  Its powers include flight, green energy balls and pink electric bolts from the torso eye and five cable spears from the waist.
- Garugadon
  Its powers include dividing into meteors, body spikes and a sword stored in the left hand.
- Garugan
  Its powers include swimming, a slime-based body and six missile launchers in each forearm.
- Guruzon
  Its powers include flight, a mace tail and finger missiles.
- Garadago
  Its powers include a neck drill, tentacles that emit electric shocks from the remote rock and burrowing.
- Ganira
  Its powers include a wrecking ball, a crab claw for the left hand and flight.
- Zurudoo
  Its powers include flight, an electromagnetic beam from the head horn and lasers from its seven torso eyes.
- Dryzer
  Its powers include rockets from both mouths, flight and finger missiles.
- Zasoris
  Its powers include burrowing, flight and head whirlwinds.
- Krag
  Its powers include turning into purple toxic gas, flight and regeneration.
- Zeminal Form 1
  Its powers include a cicada form, flight and energy absorption.
- Zeminal Form 2
  Its powers include three antennae rays, two abdomen missile launchers and pink eye lasers.
- Asterioclone Form 1
  Its powers include dividing into starfish, a purple heat ray from the eye and regeneration.
- Asterioclone Form 2
  Its powers include pectoral missiles, swimming and electric shocks from the hands.
- Vakyura
  Its powers include flight, emitting radar waves to predict attacks and a spear.
- Brian
  Its powers include burrowing, dividing into robot cats and a blue laser blade in the torso.
- Zarus
  Its powers include flight, pectoral missiles and purple lasers from both torso eyes.
- Meralian
  Its powers include mouth flames, eye lasers and high-jumping.
- Setra
  Its powers include burrowing, four thorny tentacles and ice beams from the side mouths.
- Qukong Form 1
  Its powers include a plant pod form, six fly-trap arms which emit electric shocks and burrowing.
- Qukong Form 2
  Its powers include sword hands on chains, torso missiles and pink eye lasers.
- Teragamedon
  Its powers include mouth flames, flight and heat resistance.
- Damura
  Its powers include flight and pectoral missiles.
- Degu
  Its powers include flight, green lasers from the mammary glands and eyes and back-throwing daggers.
- Shuruga
  Its powers include flight, two scythe blades on each wrist and electric tentacles from the hips.
- Gurozaurus
  Its powers include flight, a mace and a freezing cannon and drill in the mouth of the lizard lower half.

=== Twinborgs ===
- Unitogeras
  Its powers include pectoral lasers and machine guns, flight, a double-headed chariot horse with spiked wheels and mouth lasers and a constricting, bladed tail.
- Qum
  Its powers include flight, a machine gun for the right arm and rotating spikes in the torso.
- Garufua
  Its powers include flight, a lance for the right arm and a round shield for the left arm.
- Baroom
  Its powers include swimming, a green laser from the eye and torso missiles.
- Gyaraba
  Its powers include flight, crescent energy blasts from the pincer claws and waist jaws.
- Joruka
  Its powers include flight, green energy beams from the abdomen and eyes and mouth flames.
- Charade
  Its powers include toxic gas and energy beams from the abdomen mouth, flight and eye lasers.
- Darara
  Its powers include flight, swimming and a whip.
- Zaar Dan and Zaara
  Its powers include both include flight, a round shield and a trident.
- Balga
  Its powers include a tank for the lower half armed with missiles and a dragon headed flamethrower, two laser guns at the waist and three laser guns in each shoulder.
- Ginger
  Its powers include flight, a double-sided lance and pink mouth flames.
- Zobyu
  Its powers include flight, torso mines and foot missiles.
- Bronzor
  Its powers include flight, two missile launchers in the abdomen, an extendable arm in each hip which emits electricity, and twin broadswords.

=== Zaar Mecha leaders ===
- Deathark 1
  Its powers include a cutlass and a round skull shield which fires lasers from the eye sockets.
- Deathark 2
  Its powers include a pair of broadswords, flight and eye lasers.
- Deathark 3
  Its powers include a sword, high-jumping and a round skull shield.
- Dormen 1
  Its powers include a sword and a mouth energy beam.
- Dormen 2
  Its powers include a yellow laser sword, green electric lasers from the eyes and flight.
