= Aga Khan Museum of Islamic Arts =

Islamic museum in Lanao del Sur, Philippines

- Established: June 13, 1962
- Location: Marawi, Lanao del Sur
- Coordinates: 7°59′53″N 124°15′23″E
- Type: Islamic art, Moro and Lumad culture
- Director: Linang Cabugatan
- Owner: Mindanao State University

The Aga Khan Museum of Islamic Arts is a museum of Islamic art and Moro culture situated in Marawi, Lanao del Sur, Philippines.

== Background ==
Mamitua Saber opened the museum on June 13, 1962, which was initially hosted in a single room and was inaugurated on March 23, 1969. The museum moved to its present site and was renamed to its current name in 1963 after Aga Khan IV made a donation for the current museum building's construction.

The Aga Khan Museum which is housed inside a building with a white facade, hosts the biggest Filipino Muslim collection in the Philippines.

== Exhibits ==
The museum seek to preserve folk art of the Moro and Lumad people of Mindanao, Sulu archipelago and Palawan. The Aga Khan Museum features implements used in combat during the Moro wars against the Spanish and Americans such as the lantaka, kris, and kampilan.

Minitiurized pagoda-type mosques, replicas or portions of the torogan, musical instruments, farm implements are also among the displayed cultural items in the museum.

In December 2016, it was reported that more than 300 of Abdulmari Imao's calligraphic sculpture of the name of Allah is found in the Aga Khan Museum.
