= Yuka Murayama =

Japanese writer (born 1964)

- 村山由佳
- Born: 1964 (age 61–62); Tokyo, Japan
- Education: Rikkyo University
- Occupations: Writer, novelist
- Writing career
- Genre: Fiction
- Notable works: The Angel's Egg; Hoshiboshi no fune; Double Fantasy
- Notable awards: Subaru Literary Newcomer Prize; Naoki Prize; Shibata Renzaburo

Yuka Murayama (村山由佳, Murayama Yuka) (born 1964) is a Japanese writer. She has won the Subaru Literary Newcomer Prize, the Naoki Prize, and the Shibata Renzaburo Prize.

== Biography ==
Born in 1964 in Tokyo, Japan, Murayama graduated from Rikkyo University and majored in Japanese literature. Before becoming a writer she worked at as a real-estate agent and a teacher at a cram school.

In 1993 her first novel, The Angel's Egg (天使の卵 (エンジェルス・エッグ), Enjerusu eggu), won the Subaru Literary Newcomer Prize in Japan. After garnering the prize, she produced many other novels: Wild Winds, Bad Kids, Delicious Coffee Series, among others. The Angel's Egg was adapted to film in 2006 as The Angel's Egg, directed by Shin Togashi. In 2003 Murayama won the 129th Naoki Prize for Voyage Through Stars (星々の舟, Hoshiboshi no fune). In 2009 she won the 22nd Shibata Renzaburo Prize and the 4th Chuokoron Literary Prize for Double Fantasy (ダブル ファンタジー, Daburu fantaji), a story about a housewife seeking new sexual experiences. Double Fantasy was adapted into a 2018 Wowow television drama starring Asami Mizukawa.

Yuka Murayama lives in Chiba Prefecture near Tokyo.

== Recognition ==
- 1993 6th Subaru Literary Newcomer Prize
- 2003 129th Naoki Prize (2003上)
- 2009 4th Chuokoron Literary Prize
- 2009 22nd Shibata Renzaburo Prize

== Bibliography ==
- Enjerusu eggu (天使の卵 (エンジェルス・エッグ), The Angel's Egg), Shueisha, 1994, ISBN 9784087740516
- Hoshiboshi no fune (星々の舟, Voyage Through Stars), Bungeishunjū, 2003, ISBN 9784163216508
- Daburu fantaji (ダブル ファンタジー, Double Fantasy), Bungeishunjū, 2009, ISBN 9784163275307
- Prize, Bungeishunjū, 2025, ISBN 978-4163919300
