= Yūki Amami =

Japanese actress (born 1967)

- 天海 祐希
- Born: Yuri Nakano (中野 祐里); 8 August 1967 (age 59); Taitō, Tokyo, Japan
- Occupation: Actress
- Years active: 1987–present
- Agent: Ken-On
- Website: www.ken-on.co.jp/amami

Yūki Amami (天海 祐希, Amami Yūki; born August 8, 1967) is a Japanese actress and former leading otokoyaku (男役, "male role") of Takarazuka Revue.

== Career ==
Amami joined the Takarazuka Revue in 1987 and retired from the stage company in 1995. Amami was the youngest actress in the company's history to be cast in a top male role. As an otokoyaku (男役, male role), she belonged to the Moon Troupe (Tsuki).

She was involved in various famous musicals when she was in the company, including Gone With the Wind, where she starred as Rhett Butler, and Me and My Girl. After resigning from the company, she continued to work as a television and film actress, winning awards for her roles in Divorce Lawyer, The Queen's Classroom, and Boss.

In May 2013, Amami suffered a mild heart attack after performing in the stage production L’honneur de Napoleon at the Tokyo Metropolitan Theatre. Although she wanted to return, she decided to bow out of the role on her doctor's advice and wrote a letter of apology to her fans.

== Filmography ==
=== Film ===
| Year | Title | Role | Notes | Ref. |
|---|---|---|---|---|
| 2016 | Case Closed: The Darkest Nightmare | Curaçao (voice) | | |
| 2021 | What Happened to Our Nest Egg!? | Atsuko Gotō | Lead role | |
| 2021 | The Supporting Actors: The Movie | Herself | | |
| 2023 | Baian the Assassin, M.D. | Omi | | |
| 2024 | Fushigi Dagashiya Zenitendō | Beniko | Lead role | |
| 2025 | Climbing for Life | Etsuko Kitayama | | |
| 2025 | Emergency Interrogation Room: The Final Movie | Yukiko Makabe | Lead role | |
| 2026 | The Keeper of the Camphor Tree | Chifune Yanagisawa (voice) | | |
| 2026 | The Hikikomori Extraction | Doctor Akamatsu | | |

=== TV drama ===
| Year | Title | Role | Notes | Ref. |
|---|---|---|---|---|
| 2002 | Toshiie and Matsu | Haru | Taiga drama | |
| 2009 | The Waste Land | Beniko Hamanaka | | |
| 2018 | As a Father of Murderer Son | Kyoko Kanzaki | TV movie | |

=== Japanese dub ===
| Year | Title | Role | Notes | Ref. |
|---|---|---|---|---|
| 2011 | Real Steel | Bailey Tallet | | |
| 2015 | Minions | Scarlett Overkill | | |
| 2018 | Thor: Ragnarok | Hela | | |

== Awards and nominations ==
| Year | Organization | Award | Work | Result | Ref. |
|---|---|---|---|---|---|
| 1997 | 20th Japan Academy Awards | Rookie of the Year | Christmas Apocalypse | Won | |
| 2002 | 25th Japan Academy Film Prize | Best Female Supporting Role | Sennen no Koi: Hikaru Genji Monogatari | Nominated | |
| 2002 | 44th Blue Ribbon Awards | Best Actress | Inugami, Rendan, Sekai no Chūshin de, Ai o Sakebu | Won | |
| 2002 | 23rd Yokohama Film Festival | Best Supporting Actress | Inugami, Rendan | Won | |
| 2002 | 5th Nikkan Sports Drama Grand Prix | Best Supporting Actress | Suiyōbi no Jōji | Won | |
| 2005 | 8th Nikkan Sports Drama Grand Prix | Best Actress | Divorce Lawyer | Won | |
| 2006 | 9th Nikkan Sports Drama Grand Prix | Best Actress | The Queen's Classroom | Won | |
| 2010 | 13th Nikkan Sports Drama Grand Prix | Best Actress | Boss | Won | |
| 2020 | 43rd Japan Academy Film Prize | Best Supporting Actress | The Bucket List | Nominated | |
| 2021 | 34th Nikkan Sports Film Awards | Best Actress | What Happened to Our Nest Egg!? | Won | |
| 2021 | 46th Hochi Film Awards | Best Actress | What Happened to Our Nest Egg!? | Nominated | |
| 2022 | 64th Blue Ribbon Awards | Best Actress | What Happened to Our Nest Egg!? | Nominated | |
| 2022 | 45th Japan Academy Film Prize | Best Actress | What Happened to Our Nest Egg!? | Nominated | |
| 2025 | 28th Nikkan Sports Drama Grand Prix | Best Supporting Actress | Believe: A Bridge to You | Won | |
