= The Space Explorers =

- Created by: Fred Ladd
- Country of origin: United States

Original release
- Release: 1958

The Space Explorers is an American animated film created by Fred Ladd that was later turned into a cartoon serial and spawned a sequel series, New Adventures of the Space Explorers. The film aired in 1958; the sequel series aired the following year. For accuracy, both animated feature films used a consultant from Hayden Planetarium.

== Synopsis ==
The cartoon, which featured Jimmy, Smitty and Professor Leon Nordheim on board the Polaris spaceship, taught space-related concepts.

== Production ==
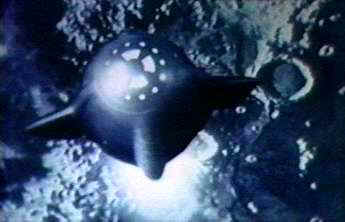
Polaris spaceship

The films were originally created for the education market, to be shown in classrooms. They were made under the technical guidance of Franklyn M. Branley, Associate Astronomer, American Museum of Natural History-Hayden Planetarium. It may have been rushed into production to "capitalize on the Sputnik craze".

The material comes primarily from three foreign films:

- Various animation sequences come from the 1951 Russian film "Universe" by the late Soviet director Pavel Klushantsev.
- Images of the rocket Polaris come from footage of German film "Weltraumschiff 1 Startet" (Anton Kutter, 1937).
- Except for images of the interior of the spaceship, images of the characters and from the walk on planet were extracted from a Russian cartoon film "Polet na lunu" (Flight to the moon), 1953, (Soyuzmultfilm).

== Release ==
The Space Explorers first aired in 1958 on nationwide television shows such as Claude Kirchner's on WWOR-TV, Captain Kangaroo, Captain Video (DuMont), Captain Satellite, Sheriff John, Officer Joe Bolton, and Romper Room. It was followed by the two-hour-long sequel New Adventures of the Space Explorers the following year.

== In popular culture ==
The spaceship from the series, the Polaris, has been featured on the very beginning of Chapter 5 of NOVA's Public Television (PBS) production of The Elegant Universe: Superstrings, Hidden Dimensions, and the Quest for the Ultimate Theory. It has also been seen on Mike Myers Saturday Night Live skit Dieter.

== Reception ==
In a book written by Ladd and Harvey Deneroff, they describe the film as a "cult classic".

According to Jörg Hartmann The Space Explorers instantly became widely distributed in North American TV. It stood out among similar-themed children's series through its impressive special effects. The Space Explorers as well as the New Adventures of the Space Explorers remained very popular for ten years. Hartmann assumed that the popularization of space flight through media like the Space Explorers influenced some members of the Baby boomer generation to take up careers in that field, who put the depicted flight around the Moon into practice in the 1960s.

Telepolis journalist Marcus Hammerschmitt called The Space Explorers an instant hit, and concluded that the climate in late-1950s America must have been favorable for its reception. He counted The Space Explorers among the works by Ladd which contributed to the spread of anime in the West. Hammerschmitt also saw a parallel between the incorporation of film material produced in Nazi Germany into an American piece of media and the careers of some rocket engineers from the German Peenemünde facility who successfully continued to work at NASA.
