= New Tetsujin-28 =

1980 television anime

- Cover for the second DVD box set in Japan

太陽の使者 鉄人28号 (Taiyō no Shisha Tetsujin Nijū-hachi-gō)
- Genre: Mecha
- Created by: Mitsuteru Yokoyama
- Anime television series
- Directed by: Tetsuo Imazawa
- Produced by: Shigeru Akagawa; Toru Horikoshi
- Written by: Hideo Takayashiki; Keisuke Fujikawa; Masaaki Sakurai; Noboru Shiroyama; Yoshihisa Araki; Yutaka Kaneko
- Music by: Yasuaki Shimizu
- Studio: Tokyo Movie Shinsha
- Licensed by: NA: Discotek Media
- Original network: NNS (NTV)
- English network: NA: Sci-Fi Channel
- Original run: October 3, 1980 – September 25, 1981
- Episodes: 51

New Tetsujin-28 (太陽の使者 鉄人28号, Taiyō no Shisha Tetsujin Nijūhachi-gō; lit. Solar Messenger Iron Man #28) is a 1980 Japanese mecha anime television series produced by Tokyo Movie Shinsha, and a modern style remake of Mitsuteru Yokoyama's manga Tetsujin 28-go. It was directed by Tetsuo Imazawa and produced by both Shigeru Akagawa and Toru Horikoshi. It aired on Nippon Television from October 3, 1980, to September 25, 1981, with a total count of 51 episodes.

Fred Ladd and TMS converted the series into The New Adventures of Gigantor, which was broadcast on the Sci-Fi Channel in the United States from September 9, 1993, to June 30, 1997.

== English opening narration ==
At the beginning of the 21st century, scientists found that with new computers and super alloys, they could build an even bigger, faster Gigantor. They built the new Gigantor!

== Plot ==
In 1990s, when solar energy, a pollution-free energy source, has become widespread throughout the world. Shotaro Kaneda is a young boy whose dead scientist father created the giant robot Tetsujin-28 after realizing the chances of attacks from outer galaxies. Shotaro has possession of the only V-controller, kept in an attache case, which enables him to have direct command of the all mighty Tetsujin-28. If the V-controller goes into the hands of the enemy, this could lead Tetsujin-28 to fight for villains who want to destroy the earth. Whenever peace in this world is threatened from Branch, aliens, and others, Shotaro together with his friends, Dr. Shikishima, Detective Otsuka, must unleash the power of our metallic super hero.

== Japanese cast ==
- Eiko Hisamura as Shotaro Kaneda
- Ikuko Tani as Utako Shikishima
- Yoshio Kaneuchi as Dr. Shikishima
- Kousei Tomita as Inspector Ohtsuka
- Kumiko Takizawa as Makiko Shikishima
- Osamu Kobayashi as Branch
- Keiko Toda as Prince Gula
- Kenji Utsumi as Space Demon King
- Ikuo Nishikawa as Robby
- Aiko Konoshima as Gina Hayakawa
- Tamio Ōki as Dr. Franken
- Kazuyuki Sogabe as Narrator

== English cast ==
- Barbara Goodson as Jimmy Sparks, Marana/Lady Shroud, Bonnie Brilliant, Star
- Doug Stone as Bob Brilliant
- Tom Wyner as Inspector Blooper, Dr. Kendamu/Dracula, Moldark, Narrator
- Gregg Berger as Coldark
- Jeff Winkless as Opening Narration

== Broadcast ==
The series was created by Tokyo Movie Shinsha and broadcast on Nippon Television in Japan between October 3, 1980, and September 25, 1981, every Friday from 18:00 to 18:30 (JST). The opening theme was Taiyo no Shisha Tetsujin Nijūhachi-gō (太陽の使者・鉄人28号, Solar Messenger, Iron Man #28) by song Junichi Kawauchi. The first ending theme (episode#1-25) was Kibō ni mukatte 〜 Shōtarō no tēma 〜 (希望にむかって〜正太郎のテーマ〜, Theme of Shotaro: Toward the Hope) and the second ending theme (episode#26-51) was Muteki no Tetsujin Nijūhachi-gō (無敵の鉄人28号, The Invincible: Iron Man #28), both song by Junichi Kawauchi.

The series was adapted for North America by Fred Ladd and broadcast as The New Adventures of Gigantor on the Sci-Fi Channel from September 9, 1993. This broadcast ended on June 30, 1997, after reruns.

The series was also broadcast in the 1980s in Arab countries (as "رعد العملاق" – Thunder Giant), Spanish-speaking countries (as Ironman 28), Italy (as Super Robot 28), Hong Kong and South Korea.

=== Episodes ===
No.	Title	Original release date
1	"The Plot to Steal the Sun" (Japanese: 太陽の使者!鉄人28号)	October 3, 1980
2	"Hands of the Enemy" (Japanese: 奪われた鉄人!)	October 10, 1980
3	"Deadly Doctor Doom" (Japanese: 暴走特急をとめろ!)	October 17, 1980
4	"The Robot Birdman" (Japanese: 恐怖の怪鳥群団)	October 24, 1980
5	"The Phantom Robot" (Japanese: 謎の幽霊ロボット)	October 31, 1980
6	"Monster of the Deep" (Japanese: エーゲ海の大怪獣!)	November 7, 1980
7	"The Crashing Satellite" (Japanese: 死を呼ぶ人工衛星)	November 14, 1980
8	"The Dreaded Double Robot" (Japanese: 恐怖の殺人合体ロボ)	November 21, 1980
9	"Menace from Space" (Japanese: 鉄人対エイリアン!)	November 28, 1980
10	"Bitter Revenge" (Japanese: 鉄人の弱点を見た!)	December 5, 1980
11	"The Invisible Enemy" (Japanese: 鉄人敗れる!)	December 12, 1980
12	"The Robot Runners" (Japanese: 鉄人対鉄人)	December 19, 1980
13	"Will the Real Gigantor Please Stand Up?" (Japanese: 鉄人対正太郎)	December 26, 1980
14	"The Abominable Iceman" (Japanese: 北極の大決戦!)	January 9, 1981
15	"The Dragon Master" (Japanese: 怪!幻のドラゴン)	January 16, 1981
16	"The Guardian of Evil" (Japanese: 復讐ロボ・ギルダー)	January 23, 1981
17	"The Manta Marauders" (Japanese: でた!南海の大魔神)	January 30, 1981
18	"The Pirate Submarine" (Japanese: 巨大戦艦をたたけ!)	February 6, 1981
19	"The Sting of the Scorpion" (Japanese: 地獄のサファリ・パニック!)	February 13, 1981
20	"The Fearsome Pharaoh" (Japanese: 大破壊!スフィンクスロボ)	February 20, 1981
21	"The Shrinking Ray" (Japanese: 恐るべきワナを打ちやぶれ!)	February 27, 1981
22	"Kid Warriors" (Japanese: ピンチ!たたかえない鉄人)	March 6, 1981
23	"Red Devil" (Japanese: 激突!鉄人対ふくしゅう鬼)	March 13, 1981
24	"The Fiery Robosaurus" (Japanese: 正太郎、宇宙からの大逆転!)	March 20, 1981
25	"Invaders from Space" (Japanese: 宇宙魔王現る!)	March 27, 1981
26	"The Master of Space" (Japanese: ブランチの最期)	April 3, 1981
27	"The Great Garkonga" (Japanese: キングコング対鉄人)	April 10, 1981
28	"The Pritheum Plot" (Japanese: 強敵!カンフーロボ)	April 17, 1981
29	"The Crusader Robot" (Japanese: ギネスブックへの挑戦)	April 24, 1981
30	"The Scheme to Scorch the West" (Japanese: 決死のニトロ輸送!!)	May 1, 1981
31	"The Doomsday Comet" (Japanese: 要塞彗星の襲撃!)	May 8, 1981
32	"The Thunder God" (Japanese: 死闘!白夜の対決)	May 15, 1981
33	"The Final Battle" (Japanese: 破壊された鉄人!)	May 22, 1981
34	"The Robot Who Could Think" (Japanese: 最大の敵!ブラックオックス)	May 29, 1981
35	"Blue Danger" (Japanese: 鉄人をとりもどせ!)	June 5, 1981
36	"Robot on a Rampage" (Japanese: 宿命の対決!鉄人対オックス)	June 12, 1981
37	"Fall from the Sky" (Japanese: 伝説の巨人・鉄人28号)	June 19, 1981
38	"The Awesome Alpha-Bot" (Japanese: ㊙（まるひ）指令!コンボイ作戦)	June 26, 1981
39	"The Boy from Second Earth" (Japanese: 魔獣王子めざめる!)	July 3, 1981
40	"The Black Hole" (Japanese: 見た!魔王の正体)	July 10, 1981
41	"The Queen of Time" (Japanese: 鉄人が消えた!?)	July 17, 1981
42	"The Curse of Dracula" (Japanese: スリラーシリーズI 怪奇! ドラキュラのたたり)	July 24, 1981
43	"Z is for Zombie" (Japanese: スリラーシリーズII 死神ゾンビに呪われた鉄人)	July 31, 1981
44	"The Ghastly Ghost" (Japanese: スリラーシリーズIII 幽霊の正体をあばけ!)	August 7, 1981
45	"Skeemer's Demons" (Japanese: 暴走!地獄の天使)	August 14, 1981
46	"Trapped in the Past" (Japanese: 鉄人の不思議な旅)	August 21, 1981
47	"Gigantor for Sale" (Japanese: 鉄人売ります!)	August 28, 1981
48	"The Space Fortress" (Japanese: 地球最大のピンチ!)	September 4, 1981
49	"The Friend Turned Enemy" (Japanese: さらば!ブラックオックス)	September 11, 1981
50	"The Battle to Save the Earth" (Japanese: グーラ王子死す!)	September 18, 1981
51	"The Sun That Never Shines" (Japanese: 銀河の王者!鉄人28号)	September 25, 1981

== Production ==
Original author Mitsuteru Yokoyama was not keen on creating a new Tetsujin-28, but when he saw the design arranged by Katsushi Murakami, who was working on the Chogokin toys at Popy (now Bandai) at the time, he gave the go-ahead on the spot.

The series was produced with a group of creative key animators, such as Eikichi Takahashi, Hajime Kamegaki, Hideyuki Motohashi, Kazuhiro Ochi, Masahito Yamashita, Masakatsu Iijima, Osamu Nabeshima, Yoshinori Kanada and others.

Hayao Miyazaki participated as an uncredited key animator in episode 8 (part A).

== Reception ==
The anime series enjoyed a dedicated fan base and contributed to the legacy of mecha anime. It is often remembered for its charming characters, engaging story lines and impressive animation, with iconic and distinctive background music. It is regarded as a significant entry in the mecha genre, bridging the gap between classic and modern anime. The mechanics animation directors, Hideyuki Motohashi and Hajime Kamegaki, both from Studio Z5, worked hard to make the layout design look cool with dynamic action sequences. As a result, the mecha drawings were featured prominently in the anime magazine Animage.

== Release ==
All 51 episodes span on two DVD box set collections, and were released in Japan by Movic in December 2001 and March 2002, respectively. The Blu-ray version was released in Japan by Warner Bros. Home Entertainment, the first box was released in October 2016 and the second in December 2016. The Japanese version was released by Discotek Media on a 4-disc Blu-ray on January 29, 2019.

== Video games ==
In January 2012 New Tetsujin-28 was announced to appear in Super Robot Wars Z2: Regeneration Chapter.
