= Chōdenji Robo Combattler V =

Japanese anime television series

- Combattler V
- Title card

超電磁ロボ コン・バトラーV (Chōdenji Robo Konbatorā Bui)
- Genre: Mecha
- Created by: Saburo Yatsude
- Anime television series
- Directed by: Tadao Nagahama (series)
- Produced by: Kanetake Ochiai; Kei Iijima
- Written by: Keisuke Fujikawa; Masaki Tsuji; Yoshitake Suzuki; Yu Yamamoto
- Music by: Hiroshi Tsutsui; Asei Kobayashi
- Studio: Soeisha (Note: Animation studio); Toei Company (Note: Production company)
- Licensed by: NA: Discotek Media
- Original network: ANN (NET/TV Asahi)
- Original run: 17 April 1976 – 28 May 1977
- Episodes: 54
- Manga

Chōdenji Taisen Victory Five
- Written by: Yuichi Hasegawa
- Published by: Futabasha
- Magazine: Super Robot Magazine
- Original run: July 2001 – July 2003
- Volumes: 2

Combattler V, full name Chōdenji Robo Combattler V (超電磁(ちょうでんじ)ロボ コン・バトラーV(ブイ), Chōdenji Robo Konbatorā Bui; lit. Super Electromagnetic Robot Combattler V), is a Japanese mecha anime television series produced by Toei Company and animated by Soeisha (later renamed as Nippon Sunrise) that aired from 1976 to 1977. It is the first installment of the Robot Romance Series of super robot series created by Saburo Yatsude and directed by Tadao Nagahama. It aired on NET/TV Asahi in Japan from 17 April 1976 to 28 May 1977.

The show follows the adventures and battles of the Battle Team, a group of young pilots, as they battle against the Campbell Empire from outer space.

== Story ==
Thousands of years ago, the people of the planet Campbell decided to leave their planet and seek out new worlds to inhabit. One group, led by the scientist Oreana, landed on Earth, but was delayed from their mission. In the early 21st century, Oreana's group reawakens and begins their plan to conquer the Earth. The only effective defense against the Campbellians' giant bio-mechanical slave beasts is the super-electromagnetic robot, Combattler V and its pilots.

The entire series follows the then-standard monster-of-the-week format, with the first season featuring Garuda sending various mecha to defeat Combattler V. His tactics range from brute force to cunning and taking hostages. He even duels Hyouma in a sword fight with their feet chained together; though just as Hyouma is about to kill him, he is saved by Oreana. As the series moves on, his trust in Oreana lessens. Garuda eventually discovers that he is in fact a cyborg, and uncovers a robot specifically designed for him. In the final episode of the first season, he defeats Oreana, and duels Combattler V, which eventually leads to his defeat.

The second season features Empress Janera and her generals Dungele and Warchimedes. The second season's structure is quite similar to the first, but involves more serious plot points such as the taking of hostages and plots to kill the team. Eventually, the entire base of the Campbellian empress is deployed, and only through the help of the airborne Nanbara Connection Base is Combattler V able to destroy it, but Janera manages to deploy an "Earth Bomb" which is supposed to destroy the Earth. Notably, the team is not dispirited, but is quite calm and instead happy for having the chance to fight to protect Earth. Just as it looks as though Earth will be destroyed, the "true" leader of the Campbellians, Deus, riding in a golden wagon, informs the team of the coup d'etat at Campbell, and stops the bomb seconds before it burrows into the core of the Earth.

== Characters ==
=== Battle Team ===
- Hyoma Aoi (葵豹馬, Aoi Hyōma) / Voiced by: Yūji Mitsuya
  The hot-blooded leader of the team, dressed in red. Hyoma is an avid motorcyclist and speed freak. He pilots the Battle Jet, which forms the head of Combattler V. After Garuda destroys his arms, he gets cybernetic replacements.
- Juzo Naniwa (浪花十三, Naniwa Jūzō) / Voiced by: Keaton Yamada
  The second member of the team, dressed in blue. Juzo is a cool, level-headed Olympic-class marksman. He pilots the Battle Crusher, which forms the chest and arms of Combattler V. He is the only member of the team whose birthdate is revealed: April 1, 1958.
- Daisaku Nishikawa (西川大作, Nishikawa Daisaku) / Voiced by: Kazuya Tatekabe
  The third member, dressed in brown. Daisaku is a judo master who also enjoys sketching. He pilots the Battle Tank, which forms the torso of Combattler V, and the Battle Tank is also the only Battle Machine that cannot fly under its own power.
- Chizuru Nanbara (なんばら ちずる, Nanbara Chizuru) / Voiced by: Miyuki Ueda
  The fourth member, and only female member of the team, dressed in pink. Chizuru is also the granddaughter of Doctor Nanbara. She pilots the Battle Marine, which forms the legs of Combattler V. Upon learning that she has valvular heart disease, she tries to hide it until it disables her in the middle of a battle. Afterwards, she undergoes surgery to correct the condition and returns to continue the fight against the Campbellians. Eventually, she falls in love with Hyoma.
- Kosuke Kita (北小介, Kita Kosuke) / Voiced by: Sachiko Chijimatsu
  The fifth member, dressed in green. Kosuke is a child genius and inventor. He pilots the Battle Craft, which forms Combattler V's feet.
- Doctor Nanbara (南原博士, Nanbara-hakase) / Voiced by: Goro Naya
  The founder and director of the Nanbara Connection, the Battle Team's base of operations, and creator of Combattler V. He dies shortly into the series, after naming Professor Yotsuya his successor.
- Professor Yotsuya (四ッ谷博士, Yotsuya-hakase) / Voiced by: Kousei Tomita
  After the death of Professor Nanbara, Yotsuya takes over the operation of the Nanbara Connection. A drunkard and misanthrope, he nevertheless vows to defend the earth from the alien invaders.
- Ropet (ロペット, Ropetto) / Voiced by: Masako Nozawa
  A red robot that monitors the emotional state of the Battle Team, and authorizes combination by shouting "Combine O.K.!".
- Kinta and Chie Ichinoki (一木金太 & 一木知恵, Ichinoki Kinta, Ichinoki Chie) / Voiced by: Masako Nozawa and Voiced by: Noriko Tsukase
  The children of Nanbara Connection's cook, who show up after the midpoint of the series. They played the role of comic relief, giving the latter half of the series a much more comedic tone than the serious first half. Along with their pet frog, Keroppe, they sometimes pilot the sidekick machine Kerott into battle.
- Dr. Lawrence Picadelly (ローレンス・ピカデリー博士, Roorensu Pikaderii-hakase) / Voiced by: Jouji Yanami
  The head of the Lawrence Robotics Research Institution in the country of Great Fridden, and the Garganchuwa's developer. He appears in episode 18 but is killed.

=== Campbellians ===
- Oreana (オレアナ, Oreana) / Voiced by: Masako Nozawa
  Garuda's "mother", Oreana orders him to attack the earth. The Campbellians' greatest scientist, she built a giant statue to house her mind in before coming to earth in search of a new home for her people. After her dismissal of Garuda and his discovery of the truth behind his existence, she reveals a mechanical body housed within the statue and attempts to attack Combattler using a 'Null Electromagnetic Ray' from her forehead to drain the robot of its power, but she is ultimately destroyed by Garuda.
- Great General Garuda (大将軍ガルーダ, Dai Shogun Garūda) / Voiced by: Osamu Ichikawa
  The ostensible leader of the Campbellian's attacks on earthling cities, Garuda oversees the deployment of the Slave Monsters (monster of the week). He is able to change his appearance at will from a blue-skinned, blonde-haired human to a humanoid eagle. After numerous failures to destroy Combattler V and the Nanbara Connection, he is stripped of his rank by Oreana. Soon after, he learns the truth of his origin: he is actually the last in a line of androids created by Oreana to be her perfect son and the leader of the invasion force. Consumed by revenge, he finishes building the incomplete slave beast Big Garuda and uses it to destroy half part of Oreana's head. After Oreana gets killed by Combattler V, he ultimately battles it but gets defeated and died.
- Miia (ミーア, Miia) / Voiced by: Sachiko Chizimatsu
  One of Garuda's android assistants. She is secretly in love with Garuda, but he is oblivious to her feelings. In a gambit to save Garuda after he is dismissed, she sacrifices her life piloting the slave beast Demon against Combattler V.
- Narua (ナルア, Narua) / Voiced by: Kazuya Tatekabe
  Another of Garuda's subordinates, he is in charge of training and activating the slave beasts that fight Combattler V.
- Girua (ギルア, Girua) / Voiced by: Ken'ichi Ogata
  Garuda's strategic advisor. After Garuda's dismissal, he is given command of Oreana's forces, only to be killed by Combattler V during the latter's confrontation with Oreana.
- Empress Janera (女帝ジャネラ, Jotei Janera) / Voiced by: Noriko Tsukase
  The final enemy of Combattler V and a very powerful sorceress. She can transform from a beautiful woman into a snakelike creature. She has a eyed-magical cane which can impose orders to Warchimedes and Dungele's helmets for their disobedience. In the penultimate episode, she attempts to destroy the Nanbara Connection and Combattler V with a bomb attached to Combattler's foot. Professor Yotsuya discovers the bomb in time to separate the foot from the rest of Combattler and raise the Choudenji Barrier, sacrificing the Connection and saving Combattler. Upon hearing of the revolt on Campbell, she makes a final attack on the forces of the Earth, but is defeated by Combattler. As her final revenge, she attempts to destroy the earth by sending a thermonuclear explosive into the planet's core. As she attempts to escape earth, Warchimedes confronts her and destroys himself to kill her.
- Warchimedes (ワルキメデス, Warukimedesu) / Voiced by: Osamu Ichikawa
  Janera's scientific and strategic advisor, and Dungele's older brother. He coordinates the building and selection of the Magma Beasts that are sent to fight Combattler V. After the death of Dungele, he pilots a Magma Beast into battle, attacking Combattler V and giving Janera the opportunity to destroy the Nanbara Connection. When he is defeated, his brain is transferred into a robot body, which he then self-destructs to kill Janera. His name, pronounced "Warukimedesu" in Japanese, rather than being partly based on the English word "war", may be better regarded as a portmanteau formed from "waru" (meaning "evil") and "Arukimedesu" (Archimedes), thus epitomising the classic sci-fi concept of a great but evil scientist.
- General Dungele (ダンゲル将軍, Dangeru-shougun) / Voiced by: Ken'ichi Ogata
  Janera's other subordinate, and Warchimedes's younger brother. He pilots the Magma Beasts against Combattler V and the Nanbara Connection. One of his hands is an oversized lobster-like pincer. After numerous defeats at the hands of Combattler V, Janera kills him by detonating a bomb inside his helmet.
- Deus (デウス, Deusu) / Voiced by: Hidekatsu Shibata
  The true leader of the Campbellians. After the coup d'etat which overthrew Janera's supporters on Campbell, he came to Earth to help rebuild the cities damaged by Janera's attacks.

== Development ==
Combattler V was produced by Toei under their Toei Television Division, a new division created to produce works with other animation studios in Japan back in the 70's while being the first collaboration with the animation studio Soeisha. A sizable portion of the staff that worked on the earlier show Reideen The Brave also worked on Combattler V, but according to Tadao Nagahama, there were still efforts to sell a continuation to Reideen even when it looked to be clearly ending, ignoring the demands of Combattler's producer, Takashi Iijima. In the end, right at the point where creating the new program would have been at the last second, Nagahama rejected the continuation of Reideen and its staff finally went over to work on Combattler, putting pressure on their schedule.

Getter Robo also largely influenced the design of Combattler V itself, as toys made of the former were unable to replicate its three-state combination abilities to an extent that satisfied consumers. Thus, Combattler V was designed in such a way that toy makers would be able to include this function more easily. Katsuji Murakami, who was in charge of the design, said that the concept was brought in Toei executive Ryotoku Watanabe on "An idea sketch of a robot that combines like a Daruma Otoshi with a round cut", but Murakami decided to design the individual machines in a distinct matter becoming the base concept for Combattler. However, the original design requires 9 machines to combine, which is later cut down to 5. The same concept would later go on to be used in Voltes V and in the Super Sentai series.

For the character designs, Nagahama invited neighborhood children to each screening of Reideen, but when they left, they saw the designs for the work on his desk and gave them harsh criticism, so he decided to change the designs. According to Yoshikazu Yasuhiko, Murakami was in charge of the robot designs, and Yasuhiko made corrections to the parts that could not be animated to look good in the finished product. However, these arrangements based on the animation production team's own judgment forced the production team to remake the molds to accommodate the changes, resulting in considerable effort and expense, which left the sponsor, Poppy, dissatisfied. For this reason, in the next series Voltes V, Poppy decided on the robot's design early in the planning stages and even told Nagahama, "Please don't change the robot's design at all. We had a lot of trouble with the manufacturing process during the Combattler era. We don't want to go through that again."

== Media ==
=== Anime ===
Combattler V aired on NET/TV Asahi in Japan from 17 April 1976 to 28 May 1977 with a grand total of 54 episodes, and was replaced by Voltes V. Ichiro Mizuki performed both the series' opening and ending themes:"Combattler V no Uta" (コン・バトラーVのテーマ, Konbatorā Bui no Uta; "The Song of Combattler V") (with The Fressun Four) and "Ike! Combattler V" (行け！コン・バトラーV, Ike! Konbatorā Bui; "Go! Combattler V") (alongside Columbia Yurikago Kai). All lyrics are credited to Saburou Yatsude (the pseudonym for the production studio), while the songs were composed by Asei Kobayashi and arranged by Hiroshi Tsutsui.

In Asia, Telesuccess Productions (formerly known as Questor International) holds the Philippine rights to the anime series since its English dub premiered on RPN in 1979. It was later dubbed Filipino and Cebuano and aired on GMA in 1999. In North America, Discotek Media licensed the series and is released on BluRay on August 25, 2020.

Episode list

No.	Title Japanese title	Original release date
1	"Sortie! Defeat the Slave Beast" (Japanese: 出撃！奴隷獣を撃て)	April 17, 1976
2	"The Immortal Slave Beast" (Japanese: 不死身の奴隷獣)	April 24, 1976
3	"Slave Beast Zenda's Trap" (Japanese: 奴隷獣ゼンダの罠)	May 1, 1976
4	"Special Training! Super Electromagnetic Yo-Yo!" (Japanese: 特訓！超電磁ヨーヨー)	May 8, 1976
5	"Combine! Just in Time!" (Japanese: 合体！間一髪)	May 15, 1976
6	"Great General Garuda's Challenge" (Japanese: ガルーダ大将の挑戦)	May 22, 1976
7	"Scream! Give Me Back My Arms!" (Japanese: 叫べ！腕を返せ)	May 29, 1976
8	"Great Reversal! Two Steps Ultimate Technique!" (Japanese: 大逆転！二段必殺技)	June 5, 1976
9	"Slave Beast of Anger, Kiiru" (Japanese: 怒りの奴隷獣キール)	June 12, 1976
10	"Ropet Falls in Love" (Japanese: ロペットが恋をした)	June 19, 1976
11	"Hyouma! Jump in the Flames of Pain!" (Japanese: 燃える痛みへ飛べ豹馬！)	June 26, 1976
12	"Duel! Hyouma versus Garuda!" (Japanese: 決闘！豹馬対ガルーダ)	July 3, 1976
13	"Life-Threatening Friendship" (Japanese: 友情の危機)	July 10, 1976
14	"The Connection's Big Explosion!" (Japanese: コネクション大爆発！)	July 24, 1976
15	"The Beautiful Warrior's Trap!" (Japanese: 美しき戦士の罠！)	July 31, 1976
16	"Emergency! Machine 1's Crash!" (Japanese: 緊急！マシン1墜落)	August 7, 1976
17	"Unexpected! V is the Messenger of Hell!" (Japanese: 怪！Vは地獄の使者)	August 14, 1976
18	"Take Off! Gargantua!" (Japanese: 発進！ガルガンチュア)	August 21, 1976
19	"Shudder! The Red Flower!" (Japanese: 戦慄！赤い花)	August 28, 1976
20	"Cowardly! The Professor is Abducted!" (Japanese: 臆病！教授誘拐！)	September 4, 1976
21	"The Target is The Marine!" (Japanese: 標的はマリーン)	September 11, 1976
22	"Frozen Beast! Return to Your Planet!" (Japanese: 凍る獣！母なる星へ帰れ)	September 18, 1976
23	"Betrayed Friendship" (Japanese: 裏切られた友情)	September 25, 1976
24	"Desperate Effort! Stand, Chizuru!" (Japanese: 決死の努力！立て、チズル！)	October 2, 1976
25	"Great General Garuda's Tragedy" (Japanese: ガルーダ大将の悲劇)	October 9, 1976
26	"Oreana Castle's Collapse!" (Japanese: オレアナ城崩壊！)	October 16, 1976
27	"The Magma Beast's Miraculous Counterattack!" (Japanese: マグマ獣の奇蹟の反撃！)	October 23, 1976
28	"I Did It! Operation New V" (Japanese: やったぞ！新V作戦)	October 30, 1976
29	"Ah! The Magnificent Strange Heroes!" (Japanese: ああ！怪傑奇人軍団！)	November 6, 1976
30	"Strange Mecha Kerot's Great Deed" (Japanese: 奇怪メカ・ケロット大活躍)	November 13, 1976
31	"The Great Electromagnetism Thief, Mogma" (Japanese: 大超電磁泥棒モグマ)	November 20, 1976
32	"Fury! The Terrifying Ice Bullets" (Japanese: 怒号！凍てつく銃弾)	November 27, 1976
33	"Life or Death! The 60 Second Bout!" (Japanese: 生死！60秒勝負)	December 4, 1976
34	"Magma Beast Aiming for V" (Japanese: Vを狙うマグマ獣)	December 11, 1976
35	"No Response From the Connection" (Japanese: コネクション応答なし)	December 18, 1976
36	"Mystery of the Disappearing Enemy, Drone" (Japanese: 消える敵ドローンの謎)	December 25, 1976
37	"The Empress's Trap! Hyouma in Danger" (Japanese: 女帝の罠！豹馬危機)	January 1, 1977
38	"Ropet Isn't Good With Frogs!" (Japanese: ロペット、カエルが苦手？)	January 8, 1977
39	"The Man, Daisaku! Gutsy Strategy" (Japanese: 男だ！大作の豪腕策)	January 15, 1977
40	"Shock! Chizuru is an Imposter" (Japanese: 衝撃！チズルはニセモノ)	January 29, 1977
41	"Cowardice! Demon Hostage Operation" (Japanese: 臆病！デモン人質作戦)	February 5, 1977
42	"Clear-Eyed Assassin" (Japanese: 冷眼の暗殺者)	February 12, 1977
43	"The Empress's Hobby is Hyouma Hunting" (Japanese: 女帝の趣味は豹馬狩り)	February 19, 1977
44	"Excellent! Kerot's Disturbance Strategy" (Japanese: 見事！ケロット攪乱作戦)	March 5, 1977
45	"The Enemy's Secret Plan! Block the Spin" (Japanese: 敵の秘策！スピン封じ)	March 19, 1977
46	"Stench of Death at the Masquerade Ball!" (Japanese: 仮装舞踏会は死の香り)	March 26, 1977
47	"Dungele Captured!" (Japanese: ダンゲル捕虜となる！)	April 2, 1977
48	"The Enemy's Super Powered Robot Appears!" (Japanese: 敵に超強力ロボ出現！)	April 9, 1977
49	"All Out! Jet #2" (Japanese: 体当り！ジェット2号)	April 23, 1977
50	"Three Stage Transforming Monster Snegle" (Japanese: 三段変身獣スネーグル)	April 30, 1977
51	"Clever Scheme! Juuzo Robot Group Invasion" (Japanese: 奇策！十三ロボ群襲来)	May 7, 1977
52	"Dungele Dies With the Setting Sun!" (Japanese: ダンゲル落日に死す！)	May 14, 1977
53	"The End of the Connection!" (Japanese: コネクションの最期！)	May 21, 1977
54	"V the Ambassador of Peace is Indestructible!" (Japanese: 平和の使者Vは不滅なり！)	May 28, 1977

=== Toys ===
Popy released both Popinica, Chogokin and Jumbo Machinder versions of the titular mecha in Japan, with the first two can accurately combine while the Jumbo Machinder version can convert into a ridable Grandasher mode. Combattler V also appeared in the United States during the late 1970s as part of Mattel's Shogun Warriors line of imported Super Robot toys under the name of 'Combattra', and as such was one of the three Super Robots in the Marvel Comics companion series.

Combattler V also became a main staple of Bandai's long running Soul of Chogokin line of collectable adult toys, starting the GX-03 Combattler V.

=== Video Games ===
Combattler V and its storyline have appeared in many entries in the Super Robot Wars franchise of video games, starting with 3rd Super Robot Wars in 1993.

In 2012, a Combattler V pachinko game was released by Kyoraku Sangyo, featuring remade animation clips from the original series.

=== Manga ===
A crossover manga sequel titled "Chōdenji Taisen Victory Five" (超電磁大戦ビクトリーファイブ, Chōdenji Taisen Bikutorī Faibu; "Super Electromagnetic War Victory Five") was written and illustrated by Yuichi Hasegawa, serialized in Futabasha's Super Robot Magazine from July 2001 to July 2003 compiling into two Tankobon volumes. The manga is a crossover between Combattler V and the other two installments of the Robot Romance Series: Voltes V and Tosho Daimos alongside Future Robot Daltanious.

== Legacy ==
The series was influential in the mecha genre, helping to pave the way for further portrayals of transforming robots.
