= Iga no Kagemaru =

Japanese manga series

伊賀の影丸
- Manga
- Written by: Mitsuteru Yokoyama
- Published by: Shogakukan
- Imprint: Shōnen Sunday Comics
- Magazine: Weekly Shōnen Sunday
- Original run: 1961 – 1966
- Volumes: 15
- Live-action film
- Directed by: Noboru Ono
- Produced by: Yoshio Mori; Yasuda Taketo
- Written by: Koji Takada; Mitsuteru Yokoyama
- Music by: Hiroya Abe
- Studio: Toei Company
- Released: July 24, 1963
- Runtime: 70 minutes

Iga no Kagemaru (Japanese: 伊賀の影丸; "Kagemaru of the Iga Clan") is a Japanese manga series written and illustrated by Mitsuteru Yokoyama. It was serialized in Shogakukan's Weekly Shōnen Sunday from 1961 to 1966. The series was collected into fifteen tankōbon volumes released between 1969 and 1976. The manga was adapted into a live-action film by the Toei Company in 1963.

== Cast ==
- Kagemaru of the Iga: Hiroki Matsukata
- Ieyasu Tokugawa: Ryuji Kita
- Ukyo: Kyoko Mikage
- Sandayu Hyakuchi: Kinnosuke Takamatsu
- Daihachi: Nobuo Saito
- Sayamaru: Etsuko Kotani
- Evil Demon Amano: Shingo Yamashiro
- Hansuke: Yoshio Yoshida
- Kumomaru: Dan Tokumaro
- Gorobei: Kenji Kusumoto
- Hantayu: Hiroshi Hatano
- Jubei: Daisuke Awaji
- Inumaru: Mitsuo Asano
