= Abdulmari Imao =

Filipino painter and sculptor

AbdulRahman Ahmad Akesh
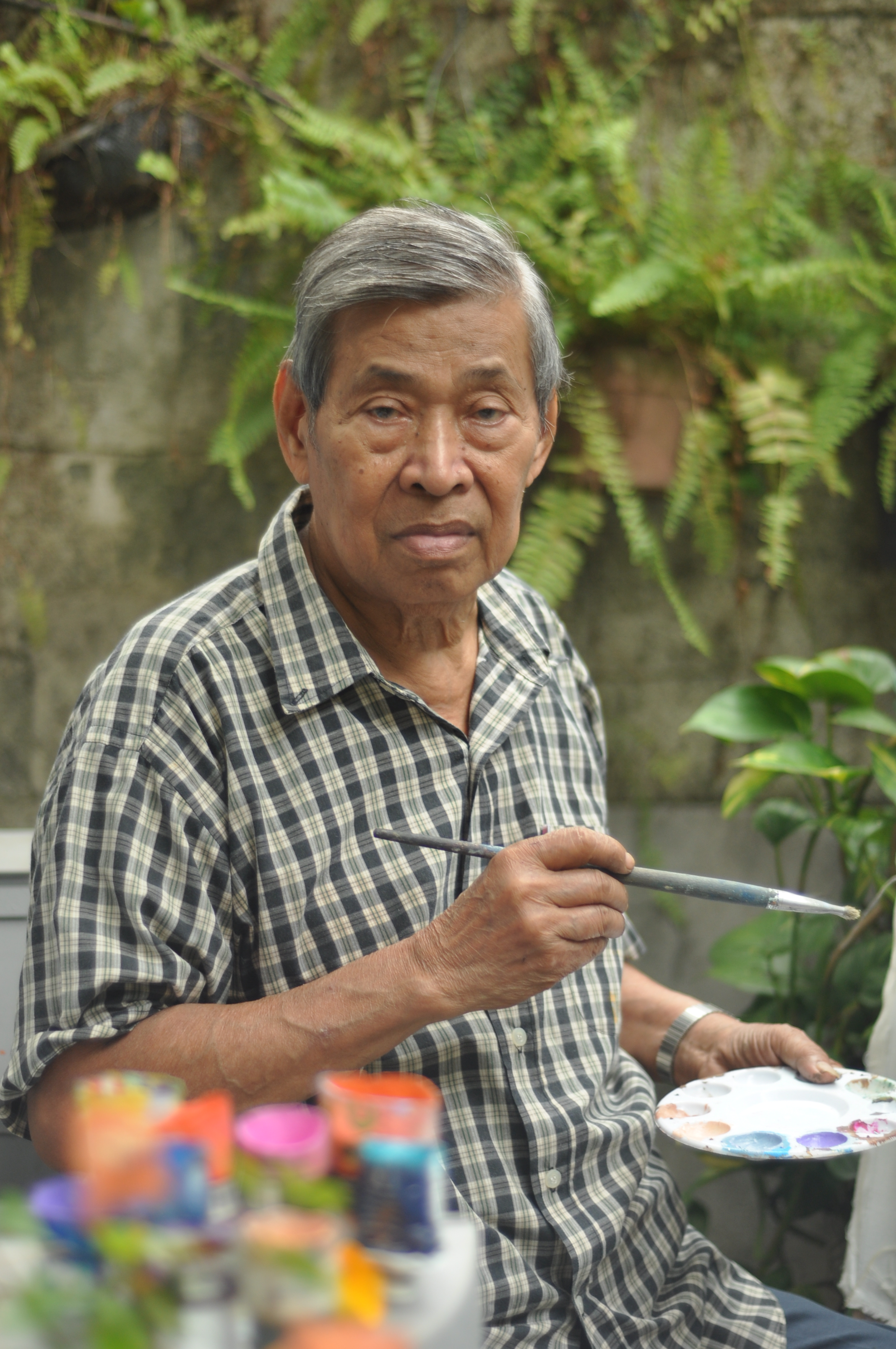
- Born: 14 January 1936; Siasi, Sulu, Philippine Commonwealth
- Died: 16 December 2014 (aged 78); Marikina, Philippines
- Education: University of the Philippines; University of Kansas
- Known for: Sculpture, Painting
- Awards: Order of National Artists of the Philippines

Abdulmari Asia Imao (14 January 1936 – 16 December 2014) was a Filipino painter and sculptor. Imao was named National Artist of the Philippines for Visual Arts in 2006. A Tausūg, Imao is the first Moro to receive the recognition. Aside from being a sculptor, Imao is also a painter, photographer, ceramist, cultural researcher, documentary film maker, writer, and a patron of Philippine Muslim art and culture.

== Early life ==
Imao was born on 14 January 1936 in Siasi, Sulu. Imao spent most of his childhood in the town of Pata, also in Sulu. His family came from a generation of tokang or boat makers dating back to the precolonial era. At the age of nine, Imao began to show interest for the arts.

Imao etched trophies with the shape of a swimmer atop a pedestal for the swimmers in Sulu. At that time, swimmers from Jolo were the best bets of the country for the Olympics.

Imao finished high school in 1956. During the same year, the Philippine Navy held a floating exhibit named LST which hosted works of Filipino artists, Fernando Amorsolo, Botong Francisco and Vicente Manansala. Imao conversed with Tomas Bernardo, who was in-charge of the exhibit, about painting and asked if Imao was into the discipline. Imao presented Bernardo some of his works who later took Imao to Manila.

== Career and education ==
Imao wrote to then President Ramon Magsaysay to seek a study grant. Jose Maria Ansaldo, aide to the President, helped Imao enter college at the University of the Philippines in Diliman, Quezon City. Imao entered as a pensionado of the Commission on National Integration. Among his mentors at the university were Guillermo Tolentino and Napoleon Abueva, who preceded him as National Artists. Imao graduated from the university with the degree Bachelor of Fine Arts in Sculpture.

In 1960, Imao entered the University of Kansas in the United States as a Smith Mundt and Fulbright Scholar. Imao was able to qualify for the top 20 slots of the scholarship. In 1962, Imao earned his Masters of Fine Arts in Sculpture, major in Metal Brass Casting. From 1962–1963 at the Rhode Island School of Design, Imao honed his craft as a scholar taking Creative Sculptor in Ceramic Technology.

Imao also entered the Columbia University in New York City under the Columbia Faculty Scholarship in the tuition of Dr. Lloyd Burden. who developed the first color processing for Kodak. Imao studied documentary motion picture and photography at the university.

In 1963, Imao received the New York Museum of Modern Art Grant to Europe and Scandinavia becoming the first Asian recipient of the grant.

On 9 June 2006, Imao was named with the National Artist of the Philippines for Sculpture. Imao was also recognized as a brass-making consultant of the United Nations.

== Style and technique ==
Imao is known for using the okir, sarimanok and the naga as motifs in his artworks and is credited for popularizing the motifs to the Filipino national consciousness. Imao draws inspiration from Tausūg and Maranao art. Imao's Islamic faith is also a source of inspiration in his art as evidenced in his sculptures composed of elements of Allah's name through Arabic calligraphy.

== Personal life ==
Imao was married to Grace Bondoc de Leon, an art dealer from Santo Tomas, Pampanga. They had four sons, including Toym. ,Juan Sajid, Josemari and AlKarim

== Death ==
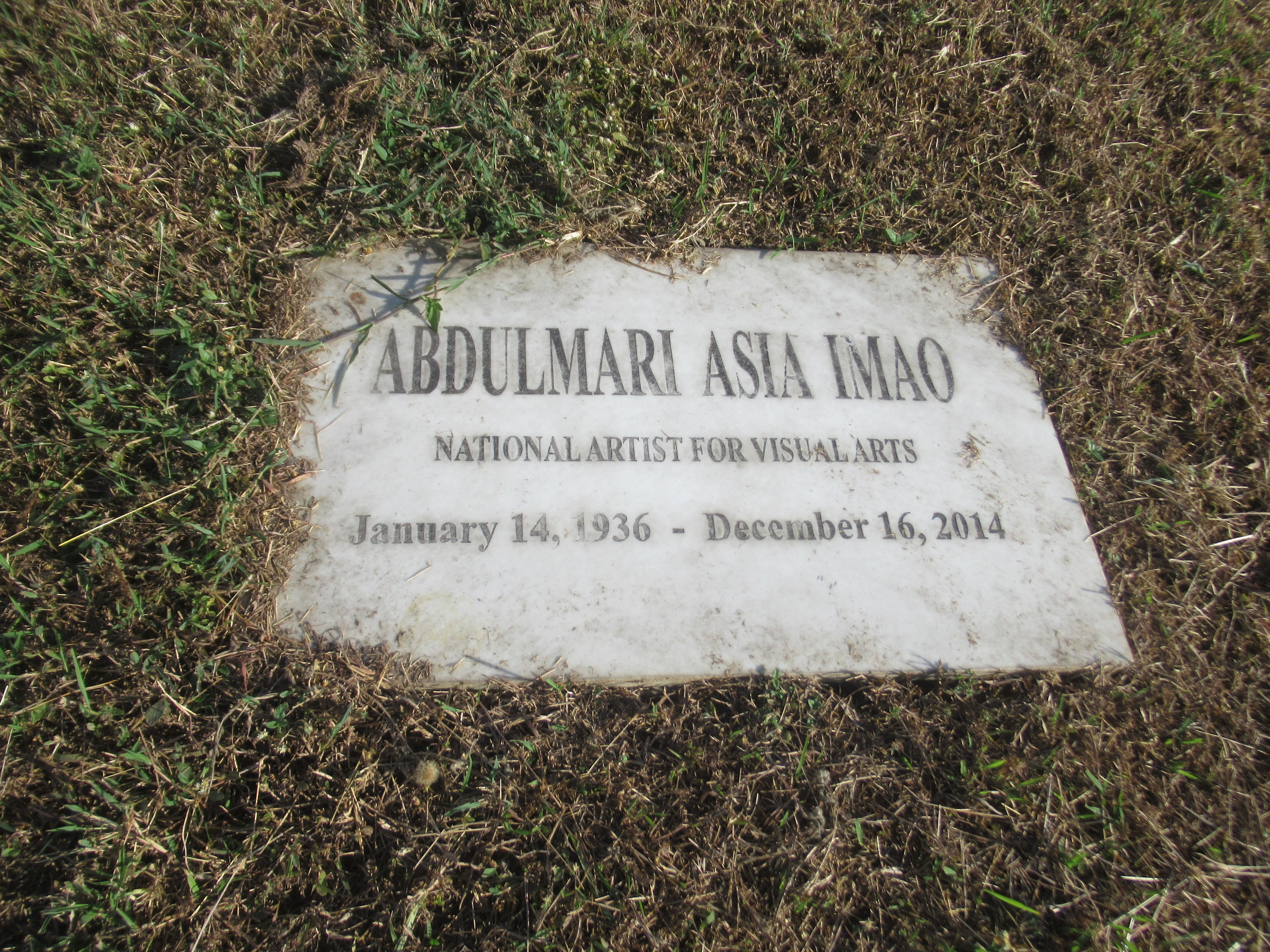
Imao's grave at the Libingan ng mga Bayani.

Imao died on 16 December 2014 at the age of 78 at his home in Marikina. Imao was suspected of dying due to heart attack but his family later released a statement through Imao's daughter-in-law, Cielo Imao, that he died in his sleep.

A traditional state necrological service and tributes, which is usually given to National Artists, was accorded to Imao on 21 December at the Cultural Center of the Philippines' Main Theater. Imao was later interred at the Libingan ng mga Bayani at noon.
