= The Angel's Egg =

- DVD cover
- Directed by: Shin Togashi
- Screenplay by: Masako Imai
- Story by: Yuka Murayama
- Based on: Angel Egg by Yuka Murayama
- Produced by: Kojiro Hashimoto
- Starring: Hayato Ichihara; Manami Konishi; Erika Sawajiri
- Cinematography: Masayuki Nakazawa
- Edited by: Akimasa Kawashima
- Music by: Yoshihide Otomo
- Distributed by: Shochiku
- Release date: October 21, 2006 (Japan)
- Running time: 114 minutes
- Country: Japan
- Language: Japanese

The Angel's Egg (Japanese: 天使の卵, Hepburn: Tenshi no Tamago) is a 2006 Japanese romantic melodrama film directed by Shin Togashi. It was written by Masako Imai, based on a novel by Yuka Murayama.

== Plot ==
On the way to hospital to visit his father, art student Ayuta Ipponyari spots and falls in love with a beautiful woman on the train. He hurriedly draws a sketch of her until she departs the train.

At hospital Ayuta is talking with his father when a new doctor enters the room and introduces herself as Dr. Haruhi Godo. Ayuta immediately recognises her as the beautiful woman from the train. He also learns that she's divorced and an older sister of his long-time girlfriend Natsuki Saito, who wants to be his bride.

Believing Haruhi is the One, Ayuta attempts to woo her into accepting his romantic interest, not realising that their emerging love triangle would carry lasting consequences for all involved.

== Cast ==
- Hayato Ichihara as Ayuta Ipponyari
- Manami Konishi as Dr. Haruhi Godo
- Erika Sawajiri as Natsuki Saito
- Tomokazu Miura as Shibusawa
- Kazuma Suzuki as Hasegawa
- Keiko Toda as Sachie Ipponyari
- So Kitamura as Naoki Ipponyari
