= Pinocchio in Outer Space =

- Belgian theatrical release poster
- Directed by: Ray Goossens
- Written by: Fred Ladd
- Produced by: Fred Ladd; Raymond Leblanc; Norm Prescott; Leonard J. Aronson
- Starring: Arnold Stang; Peter Lazer; Jess Cain; Conrad Jameson; Mavis Mims; Cliff Owens; Minerva Pious; Norman Rose
- Cinematography: Fred Ladd
- Edited by: Norm Prescott
- Music by: Ray Goossens
- Production company: Belvision Studios
- Distributed by: Universal Pictures (USA)
- Release date: 22 December 1965
- Running time: 71 minutes
- Countries: Belgium; United States
- Languages: English; French

Pinocchio in Outer Space is a 1965 animated science-fantasy film which sets Carlo Collodi's Pinocchio character on a rocketship adventure.

== Production ==
Peter Lazer performs the voice of Pinocchio. It was produced by Ray Goossens at Belvision Studios, with American involvement from Norm Prescott (Filmation) and Fred Ladd. The film was released in the US by Universal Pictures as well as the second animated film from Universal.

The French version was titled Pinocchio dans l'espace and the Dutch version was known as Pinocchio in de ruimte.

The Talking Cricket character was not present in this production. Instead, Pinocchio's sidekick was Nurtle, an alien Twertle (voiced by Arnold Stang), sent by his government to investigate an unusual increase of radiation on Mars. Together they battle against Astro, a marauding intergalactic whale who was seeking revenge after being abducted by a mysterious race of Martians.

== Cast ==
- Peter Lazer – Pinocchio
- Arnold Stang – Nurtle the Twurtle
- Ray Owens – Mister Geppetto
- Conrad Jameson – G. Godline/Sharp
- Mavis Mims – The Blue Fairy
- Jess Cain – Groovy
- Norman Rose – Fedora
- Minerva Pious – The Blue Fairy's Mother
- Kevin Kennedy – Astro The Space Whale

== Comic strip adaptation ==
In 1965, the film was adapted into a comic strip by Willy Lateste, which was published in Tintin in Belgium.

== See also ==
- List of American films of 1965
- List of animated feature-length films
