= Toym Imao =

- Born: Abdulmari de Leon Imao, Jr. 1968 (age 57–58)
- Education: University of the Philippines Diliman; Maryland Institute College of Art
- Known for: Sculpture, painting
- Parent(s): Abdulmari Imao; Grace de Leon
- Website: toymimao.com/home.html

Abdulmari de Leon Imao, Jr. (born 1968), better known by either Toym Leon Imao or Toym Imao, is a Filipino educator and multi-media visual artist whose art is known for its commentary on Filipino social conditions, as well as for its pop culture sensibilities.

Among his most notable early sculptures included the Tandang Sora National Shrine in Quezon City; the Andres Bonifacio National Shrine in Maragondon, Cavite; the Dr. Jose P. Rizal statue in Carson City, California. In 2015, his exhibition "Desaparecidos" at the Bantayog ng mga Bayani was widely recognized as an important commemoration of the abuses of Martial law under Ferdinand Marcos.

== Life and education ==
Imao was born in 1968 to painter-sculptor Abdulmari Imao (who would later be conferred as National Artist of the Philippines for Visual Arts) and art collector Grace de Leon. He was nicknamed Toym by his father commemorating his earlier achievement as one of the Ten Outstanding Young Men (TOYM) awardees.

He completed his Bachelor of Science in Architecture from the University of the Philippines Diliman in 1999, and have attained his Master of Fine Arts in Sculpture from the Maryland Institute College of Art - Rinehart School of Sculpture in Baltimore, Maryland in 2012.
