= Off-Balance =

2001 film by Shin Togashi

- Theatrical release poster
- Directed by: Shin Togashi
- Screenplay by: Shiori Kazama
- Based on: Hi-baransu by Naoko Uozumi
- Produced by: Ken Hasegawa; Shigeaki Komatsu; Sadatoshi Fujimine
- Starring: Megumi Hatachiya; Fumiyo Kohinata; Yu Hatano
- Cinematography: Kōzō Shibasaki
- Edited by: Akimasa Kawashima
- Music by: Masahiro Kawasaki
- Distributed by: JVC; Media Box
- Release date: June 2, 2001 (Japan)
- Running time: 95 minutes
- Country: Japan
- Language: Japanese

Off-Balance (Japanese: 非・バランス, Hepburn: Hi-baransu) is a 2001 Japanese film directed by Shin Togashi based on the novel Hi-baransu by Naoko Uozumi, which won the author the Kodansha Award for New Writers of Children's Literature.

== Cast ==
- Megumi Hatachiya as Chiaki
- Fumiyo Kohinata as Kiku-chan
- Yu Hatano as Mizue
- Momoka Nakamura as Yukari
- Shūji Kashiwabara as Heath
- Tomato as Yuri-chan
- Kumiko Tsuchiya as Homeroom Teacher
- Ryūshi Mizukami as Video Store Clerk
- Masayo Umezawa as Mizue's Mother
- Noriko Hayami as Masayoshi's Wife
- Mieko Harada as Chiaki's Mother

== Awards ==
23rd Yokohama Film Festival

- Won: Best New Director - Shin Togashi
- 10th Best Film
