= Mitsuteru Yokoyama =

Japanese manga artist (1934–2004)

- Born: June 18, 1934; Kobe, Japan
- Died: April 15, 2004 (aged 69); Tokyo, Japan
- Occupation: Manga artist
- Known for: Tetsujin 28-go Babel II; Sally the Witch; Sangokushi; Giant Robo
- Website: yokoyama-mitsuteru.com

Mitsuteru Yokoyama (横山 光輝, Yokoyama Mitsuteru; June 18, 1934 – April 15, 2004) was a Japanese manga artist. Considered to be one of the greatest and most influential figures in the history of manga and anime, his works have had a significant impact in the creation and establishment of many genres. These include: mecha (Tetsujin 28-go), magical girl (Sally the Witch), battle manga (Babel II), ninja (Iga no Kagemaru), and literary adaptations (Sangokushi). Some of his other works include Giant Robo, Kamen and Ninja Akakage, Princess Comet, and an adaptation of the Chinese classic Water Margin.

He was born in Suma Ward of Kobe City in Hyōgo Prefecture. His personal name was originally spelled Mitsuteru (光照), with the same pronunciation.

== Biography ==
Yokoyama came out with the first book White Lily Story (白百合物語, Shirayuri monogatari) for his manga artist debut, which caught Osamu Tezuka's attention.

In 1955, Yokoyama had a title serialized in the magazine Shōjo for the first time, "Shirayuri Koushinkyoku (白ゆり行進曲, White Lily March)".

In 1956, Tetsujin 28-go appeared serially in the shōnen magazine after he resigned from the movie company. Tetsujin 28-go became a popular work equal to Tezuka's Astro Boy and its animated adaptation also made a smashing success. This prompted Yokoyama to become a full-time manga artist and to move to Tokyo the same year.

In 1964, he established "Hikari Production", an incorporated company. Making good use of his vast exposure to movies during his previous job, he produced consecutive popular hits in various genres, both in comics and anime, such as Iga no Kagemaru, Akakage, Sally the Witch, Giant Robo, Babel II and so on. With the writing of Suikoden (水滸伝, Water Margin) (1967–1971) and Sangokushi (1971–1987), he began a new chapter in his career as he drew mostly comics based on original stories with material from China's and Japan's histories.

In 1991, Sangokushi won the prize for excellence from the Japan Cartoonist Association and an animated version was broadcast on TV Tokyo.

In July 1997, Yokoyama was hospitalized with myocardial infarction and had an operation. He returned to work in March the next year.

In 2004, while under medical treatment, Yokoyama won the MEXT Prize of the Japan Cartoonist Association.

On the morning of April 15, 2004, Yokoyama suffered burns all over his body due to a fire breaking out in his house. His condition deteriorated and he fell in a coma. Yokoyama died in the hospital near his home at 10:00 P.M. on the same day, aged 69.

== Style ==
The attractions of Yokoyama's works are calculated story deployment and an elaborate setting. On the other hand, Yokoyama liked light characterizations and didn't let characters show their feelings too much. He was better at a serious story manga rather than with comedy, though he nonetheless drew comics in the latter genre.

While Tezuka established the technique to draw Japanese comics, it was Yokoyama who established the format of various genres of current Japanese comics and anime. Whereas many comic artists prefer their original stories not to be changed when adapted, Yokoyama was realistic and tolerant, so many of his works were made into animation or Tokusatsu.

- Tetsujin 28 & Giant Robo began the Mecha anime & manga genre.
- Iga no Kagemaru (伊賀の影丸, Kagemaru of Iga) & Kamen no Ninja Akakage are ninja manga which started a ninja boom. These comics present stories in which ninjas are endowed with superhuman fighting capabilities.
- Yami no Doki (闇の土鬼, Doki (soil ogre) of the darkness) is a Jidaigeki in which people of the real world appear.
- Sally the Witch, one of the first magical girl manga/anime & Princess Comet are shōjo manga.
- Yokoyama Mitsuteru Sangokushi is a historical story based on historical facts and historical novels.
- Babel II is a supernatural power science fiction comic.

== Legacy ==
Katsuhiro Otomo has cited Yokoyama as an influence and said his own series Akira has the "same overall plot" as Tetsujin 28-go. Additionally, some of its characters are also known as numbers 25, 26, 27 and 28 in homage to Tetsujin 28-go. Hirohiko Araki said that he was conscious of Yokoyama's hard-boiled style in that he sticks to suspense and describes hero characters drily. Araki also said that Jotaro Kujo wearing his school uniform in the desert has its roots in Yokoyama's Babel II, and that if he were to draw Stardust Crusaders over again, he would base the Stands on Tetsujin 28-go.
