= Fred Ladd =

American writer (1927–2021)

- Born: Fred Laderman; February 19, 1927; Toledo, Ohio, U.S.
- Died: August 3, 2021 (aged 94); Los Angeles, California, U.S.
- Occupations: Film producer, writer
- Known for: Animations (Writing, Producing, Directing)
- Children: 2

Fred Laderman (February 19, 1927 – August 3, 2021), known professionally as Fred Ladd, was an American television and film writer and producer. He is notable as the first to introduce anime to the Americas.

== Biography ==
Ladd, a Toledo, Ohio, native, graduated from Scott High School in 1945 and from Ohio State University in 1949 with degrees in radio and speech. As a child, he did impersonations of movie stars including Betty Boop. When Ladd was in high school, he liked a radio program for children called Let's Pretend, which dramatized children's stories, which would serve as an inspiration for him producing anime and for the American audiences. Upon moving to the New York City area, Ladd got a year-long job at an FM radio station and then was employed at Cayton, Inc., an advertising agency that dabbled in film production. The agency acquired several nature documentaries, and Ladd was given the job of repackaging them into a feature film. Rather than an outright sale, the film was offered in trade to European distributors (cash exports being limited in post-war Europe), in exchange for marketable local film productions. The deal resulted in the acquisition of animated cartoons, and Ladd was given the job of repackaging and dubbing the films for the American market.

Ladd became the house specialist in the "Westernizing" of overseas animated programming. A 1937 German short film on the future of space travel Weltraumschiff 1 startet was acquired, and the special effects sequences were excised by Ladd. His re-edited footage was augmented by new animated sequences and became part of a series entitled The Space Explorers which was syndicated to local TV stations from the late 1950s through the early 1960s.

Ladd co-operated with William Cayton in producing a film and television serial version of the Czech film Journey to the Beginning of Time.

Producer Norm Prescott employed Ladd to help reformat a 1965 Belgian animated feature Pinocchio dans l'espace, which was released theatrically by Universal in late 1965 as Pinocchio in Outer Space. Prescott later brought Ladd in as co-writer and co-producer on his home-grown 1972 Filmation feature Journey Back to Oz.

But it was an earlier involvement with NBC-TV that helped open a new and enduring market to North America. In 1963, the network's distribution division, NBC Enterprises, had acquired the North American distribution rights to a Japanese animated series entitled Tetsuwan Atomu, and consulted with Ladd on how to market it. Ladd took the footage and created a pilot episode, eventually leading to the long-running series Astro Boy—the inaugural appearance of anime on Western shores. Ladd removed references to Asian religion in favor of Christianity and removed scenes to violence and nudity due to it being to risky for NBC's standard and practices and to the Western audience. One incident happened where a samurai in the series was considered as violent. When Ladd flew to Mushi Productions in 1964 and explained the violent nature, they didn't understand, and they compared it to police brutality in the US. They wanted him to explain it, and Ladd just simply said it's because of cultural differences. Animation like a robber holding a rifle to a poor man's head begging for money and a bachelor seeing pictures of nude women were cut by Ladd by being over the top violence, and he explained to Tezuka about the nude women "Sorry, Mr. Tezuka, we couldn't save that, if I ended up with all those shots, we wound up with a 2 minute program." Tezuka would later dub Ladd "the godfather of Astro Boy", due to the lucrative business of America's involvement in anime after it aired.

Ladd continued his involvement in early anime imports with Gigantor for Delphi Associates and Kimba the White Lion for NBC Enterprises. Later, Ladd was creative consultant for the 1995 English dub of Sailor Moon for DiC Entertainment.

Ladd was also responsible for having various black-and-white cartoons for his company called Color Systems Inc. such as Looney Tunes, Betty Boop, and others to be redrawn colorized in South Korea from 1968 to 1974. He died on August 3, 2021, at the age of 94 from natural causes.

== Screenwriting ==
=== Anime television series dubs ===
- Astro Boy (1963–1965)
- Gigantor (1966)
- Kimba the White Lion (1966–1967)
- The Snow Queen (1981)

=== Original television scripts ===
- The Underseas Explorers (1961)
- Tarzan, Lord of the Jungle (1979)
- Hero High (1981)
- The Kid Super Power Hour with Shazam! (1981)
- The Incredible Hulk (1982)
- M.A.S.K. (1985)
- Ghostbusters (1986)

=== Foreign film dubs ===
- Pippi in the South Seas (1974)
- Pippi Goes on Board (1975)
- Pippi on the Run (1977)

=== Original film scripts ===
- The Space Explorers (1958)
- Pinocchio in Outer Space (1965)
- Journey Back to Oz (1972)

== Bibliography ==
- Fred Ladd with Harvey Deneroff, Astro Boy and Anime Come to the Americas: An Insider's View of the Birth of a Pop Culture Phenomenon (McFarland, Jefferson NC, 2008) ISBN 0-7864-3866-5
