= Shin Togashi =

Japanese film director (born 1960)

- Born: March 1960 (age 66); Fujishima, Yamagata
- Occupation: Film director

Shin Togashi (冨樫森, Togashi Shin) is a Japanese film director.

== Career ==
Born in Fujishima, Yamagata (now part of the city of Tsuruoka), Togashi attended Rikkyō University, where he was inspired by the lectures on cinema by the critic Shigehiko Hasumi. After graduating, he worked as an assistant director for pink films until he got the chance to work with his hero, the director Shinji Sōmai. Assisting on such films as Typhoon Club (1984), he got his first chance to direct a section of the omnibus film Kawaii hito (1998), which was supervised by Sōmai. That helped him make his feature film debut with Off-Balance.

He won the award for best New Director at the 23rd Yokohama Film Festival.

== Filmography ==
- Kawaii hito (1998)
- Off-Balance (2001)
- Sorry (2002)
- Night of the Shooting Stars (2003)
- Tetsujin 28: The Movie (2005)
- The Angel's Egg (2006)
- Wenny Has Wings (2008)
- Oshin (2013)
