= Sumiko Shirakawa =

Japanese actress (1935–2015)

- 白川 澄子
- Born: Sumiko Shiratō (白土 澄子); June 26, 1935; Tokyo Prefecture, Japan
- Died: November 25, 2015 (aged 80); Suginami, Tokyo, Japan
- Occupations: Actress; voice actress
- Years active: 1965–2015
- Family: Mitsuharu Shiratō (brother)

Sumiko Shiratō (白土 澄子, Shiratō Sumiko; June 26, 1935 – November 25, 2015) known professionally as Sumiko Shirakawa (白川 澄子, Shirakawa Sumiko) was a Japanese actress who specialized in voice acting.

She is best known known for her roles as Hiroshi Nakajima in Sazae-san, Hidetoshi Dekisugi in Doraemon, and Ace in Space Ace.

== Biography ==
Shirakawa was born on June 26, 1935, in Tokyo Prefecture, Japan. Being an avid fan of radio dramas, she joined the TBS Radio Drama Troupe after having graduated from the Graduate School of Letters at Keio University. She had been affiliated with Seinen Kobo, Fuji Broadcasting Pro, Tsuchi no Kai, Nanano Kai, and Kawa Troupe throughout her career.

=== Death ===
On November 26, 2015, Shirakawa failed to attend a recording session for Sazae-san. Her body was discovered at her home by family members and Sazae-san anime staff. She reportedly died of a subarachnoid hemorrhage at her home in Tokyo the night before on November 25. She was 80 years old.

=== Tribute and posthumous releases ===
A memorial message for Shirakawa was shown during the November 27 broadcast of Doraemon, with her final appearance on Sazae-san being broadcast on November 29.

Her wake was held on December 4, with her funeral and memorial service held at the Yoyohata Funeral Hall in Shibuya a day later, her brother Mitsuharu Shiratō serving as chief mourner.

Miina Tominaga, the voice of Katsuo Isono on Sazae-san, released a statement on Shirakawa's death, "I am very surprised and saddened by the sudden news of her passing. She always spoke to me so kindly at the studio. I will miss her so, so much." She spoke an in-character response to Hiroshi Nakajima's familiar catchphrase, "Hey Isono!", responding with, "Nakajima! Nakajima! We're best friends forever, right?"

== Personality ==
Her voice range was alto.

== Successors ==
Following Shirakawa's death, the following individuals have taken over her voice acting roles.

Successor	Character	Work	Debut
Rumi Ochiai	Hiroshi Nakajima	Sazae-san	Episode broadcast on December 13, 2015

== Filmography ==
=== Television animation ===
List of voice performances in television animation
Year	Title	Role	Notes	Source
1965	Space Ace	Ace	Lead role	
1965	Space Boy Soran	Fake Soran		
1965	Kaitō Pride	Check		
1965	Astro Boy	Additional voice		
1966	Jump Out! Batchiri	Batchiri	Lead role	
1966	Sally the Witch	Ken-chan, Don, Shibuya, Kenta, Goro, Tsutomu		
1967	Adventures of the Young Shadar	Roko		
1968	GeGeGe no Kitarō	Hyakume Bōya	Episode 1	
1968	Cyborg 009	Bill Curtail, Guy Curtail		
1969	Attack No. 1	Akizuki	Second voice	
1969	Tiger Mask	Jiro Sasaki		
1969	Ninpu Kamui Gaiden	Taikichi		
1969	The Genie Family	Boke-chan, Kaneda, Haruo		
1969	The Secret of Akko-chan	Motoko "Moko" Naniwa		
1969	Mōretsu Atarō	Teru		
1970	Star of the Giants	Jiro Samon		
1971	Sazae-san	Hiroshi Nakajima, Grandma Next Door, Takeo, Ikako, Horikawa	First voice	
1971	Andersen Stories	Chimney Sweep Chris, Peter/Johann, Carl	Chimney Sweep Chris in Episodes 13-14, Peter/Johann in Episodes 27-29, Carl in Episodes 42-43	
1971	Animentary: The Decision	Additional voice	Episode 10	
1971	New Little Ghost Q-Tarō	Hakase, Shinichi Ōhara		
1971	GeGeGe no Kitarō	Additional voice		
1971	Maco the Mermaid	Additional voice		
1972	Science Ninja Team Gatchaman	Chinchiro, Boy		
1972	Pinocchio: The Series	Gino		
1972	Sarutobi Ecchan	Additional voice		
1972	Mahōtsukai Chappy	Ippei Arai		
1973	Demetan Croaker, The Boy Frog	Paasuke	Episode 27	
1973	Jungle Kurobe	Additional voice		
1973	Neo-Human Casshern	Mario		
1974	New Honeybee Hutch	Additional voice		
1975	Tekkaman: The Space Knight	Boy	Episode 7	
1975	Great Mazinger	Yōichi Hamakawa	Episode 46	
1975	Time Bokan	Goemon, Pinocchio, Jim, Boy		
1975	Dog of Flanders	Andre		
1975	Maya the Honey Bee	Snail Mom, Child		
1976	Dino Mech Gaiking	Pera		
1976	First Human Giatrus	Additional voice		
1976	3000 Leagues in Search of Mother	Domenchio		
1976	Blocker Gundan 4 Machine Blaster	Ken	Episode 23	
1976	Paul's Miraculous Adventure	Paul	Lead role	
1976	Cat Eyed Boy	Yori		
1977	Dinosaur War Izenborg	Mamoru, Jirō, Tsutomu		
1977	Yatterman	Gretl, Sushi King, Ken, Tanuki		
1978	Nobody's Boy: Remi	Alexis Acquin		
1978	Gatchaman II	Harry	Episode 7	
1978	Her Majesty's Petite Angie	Tony		
1978	The Story of Perrine	Waldo	Episode 5	
1978	Majokko Tickle	Noboru Iwata		
1978	Wakakusa no Charlotte	Rene		
1979	Shin Kyojin no Hoshi II	Additional voice		
1979	Zenderman	Slim	Episode 37	
1979	Hana no Ko Lunlun	Michelle		
1979	Future Robot Daltanious	Boy		
1980	Doraemon	Hidetoshi Dekisugi		
1980	The Adventures of Tom Sawyer	Sid Sawyer		
1980	The Wonderful Adventures of Nils	Graskin	Episodes 19-20	
1981	Astro Boy	Pula, Mitsuru	Pula in Episode 34, Mitsuru in Episode 35	
1981	Muteking, The Dashing Warrior	Yoshio		
1981	Jarinko Chie	Boy in the Movie		
1983	Fuku-chan	Ichiro-kun		
1986	GeGeGe no Kitarō	Yoshio		
2014	Space Dandy	Hiroshi	Ep. 25	

=== Theatrical animation ===
List of voice performances in theatrical animation
Year	Title	Role(s)	Notes	Source
1982	Doraemon: Nobita and the Haunts of Evil	Hidetoshi Dekisugi		
1984	Doraemon: Nobita's Great Adventure into the Underworld	Hidetoshi Dekisugi		
1985	Doraemon: Nobita's Little Star Wars	Hidetoshi Dekisugi		
1988	Doraemon: The Record of Nobita's Parallel Visit to the West	Hidetoshi Dekisugi		
1995	Doraemon: Nobita's Diary on the Creation of the World	Hidetoshi Dekisugi		
1997	Doraemon: Nobita and the Spiral City	Pupi		
1999	Doraemon: Nobita's the Night Before a Wedding	Hidetoshi Dekisugi, Adult Hidetoshi Dekisugi	Short film	
2001	Doraemon: Nobita and the Winged Braves	Hidetoshi Dekisugi		

=== Video games ===
List of voice performances in video games
Year	Title	Role	Platform	Source
1999	Majokko Daisakusen: Little Witching Mischiefs	Moco	Playstation	
2001	Kids Station: Doraemon: Himitsu no Yojigen Pocket	Hidetoshi Dekisugi	Playstation	
