= The Adventures of Tom Sawyer (1980 TV series) =

1980 Japanese anime television series

- Title card
- トム・ソーヤーの冒険
- Genre: Comedy-drama, historical, adventure, western
- Based on: The Adventures of Tom Sawyer by Mark Twain
- Screenplay by: Akira Miyazaki; Hiroshi Saitō; Mei Kato; Seijirō Kōyama; Shōgo Ōta; Tadahiko Isomi; Yoshirō Tomita
- Directed by: Hiroshi Saitō
- Music by: Katsuhisa Hattori
- Opening theme: Dare yori mo tōku e by Maron Kusaka
- Ending theme: Boku no Mississippi by Maron Kusaka
- Country of origin: Japan
- Original language: Japanese
- No. of episodes: 49

Production
- Executive producer: Kōichi Motohashi
- Producer: Takaji Matsudo
- Production companies: Nippon Animation; Fuji Television

Original release
- Network: FNS (Fuji TV)
- Release: January 6 – December 28, 1980

The Adventures of Tom Sawyer (Japanese: トム・ソーヤーの冒険, Hepburn: Tomu Sōyā no Bōken) is a Japanese anime television series produced by Nippon Animation and directed by Hiroshi Saitō, which premiered on Fuji Television and its affiliates on January 6, 1980, and ended its run on December 28 the same year. It is based on the 1876 novel The Adventures of Tom Sawyer by Mark Twain (and partially on The Adventures of Huckleberry Finn).

The series was broadcast on the World Masterpiece Theater, an animation staple on Fuji TV, that each year showcased an animated version of a classical book or story of Western literature, and was originally titled Tom Sawyer no Bōken. It was the second installment of the series, after Rascal the Raccoon in 1977, to feature the work of an American author.

This series was dubbed into English by Saban International and broadcast on HBO in 1988 under the title The Adventures of Tom Sawyer at 7:30 am. It alternated with the later World Masterpiece Theater version of Tales of Little Women. Celebrity Home Entertainment released videos in the United States under the title All New Adventures of Tom Sawyer. It also aired on The Children's Channel in the UK and Network 10 in Australia and has also been dubbed in other languages, including French, Italian, Arabic, Hebrew, Portuguese, German, Hungarian, Dutch, Filipino and Spanish. In January 2011, it was shown in the United States in the original Japanese on the NHK's cable channel TV Japan. In the Philippines, it was shown on ABS-CBN, Q, Kapamilya Channel, A2Z and TV5.

== Plot ==
Set in the mid-19th century in the rural town of St. Petersburg along the Mississippi River, the story follows Tom Sawyer, a mischievous and adventurous boy who enjoys playing pranks with his best friend, Huck Finn, and their friends. Together, they spend their days embarking on imaginative adventures, including catching wild pigs in the woods, playing pirates on the river, and riding in a hot air balloon.

One night, Tom and Huck witness the outlaw Injun Joe murder Dr. Robinson in a graveyard. Injun Joe frames the innocent Muff Potter for the crime, but Tom later testifies in court and reveals the truth, clearing Muff's name. Before he can be arrested, however, Injun Joe escapes from the courtroom and disappears.

Later, while searching for a place where Huck can live, Tom and Huck visit a supposedly haunted house, where they discover Injun Joe in possession of a large treasure. Near the end of the summer, Tom and Becky Thatcher become lost while exploring a cave and encounter Injun Joe, who has been hiding there. After a tense ordeal, they are rescued by the sheriff and safely return home.

Following Injun Joe's defeat, Tom and Huck recover the treasure he had concealed, making them wealthy. Despite their newfound fortune, Tom and Huck remain as spirited and mischievous as ever, continuing to get into trouble and receiving punishment from their schoolteacher for their antics.

== Characters ==
=== Sawyers ===
Tom Sawyer as he appears in the series

- Tom Sawyer: Masako Nozawa in Japanese, Barbara Goodson in English dub.
- Sid Sawyer: Sumiko Shirakawa in Japanese, Brianne Siddall in English dub.
- Aunt Polly: Haru Endo in Japanese, Philece Sampler in English dub.
- Mary Sawyer: Kaoru Ozawa in Japanese, Melora Harte in English dub.

==== Phelpses ====
- Sally Phelps: Natsuko Kawaji
- Silas Phelps: Minoru Yada
- Penny Phelps: Yoshiko Matsuo
- Oscar Phelps: Kaneto Shiozawa in Japanese, Michael McConnohie in English dub.

=== Finns ===
- Huckleberry Finn: Kazuyo Aoki in Japanese, Wanda Nowicki in English dub
- Pap Finn: Toshiya Ueda

=== Thatchers ===
- Becky Thatcher: Keiko Han
- Judge Edward Thatcher: Ichiro Murakoshi
- Margaret & Jeff Thatcher: Yumi Nakatani, Cam Clarke (English; Jeff)

=== Others ===
- Jim: Ikuo Nishikawa
- Amy Lawrence: Kaoru Kurosu, Sanae Takagi
- Ben Rogers: Mie Azuma, Atsuko Mine
- Alfred Temple: Masako Sugaya
- Billy Fisher: Naoki Tatsuta, Ikuo Nishikawa
- Muff Potter: Eken Mine in Japanese, Robert V. Barron in English dub.
- Dr. Robinson: Jun Hazumi
- Injun Joe: Eiji Kanie and Kenji Utsumi (episodes 38-49) in Japanese, Tom Wyner in English dub.
- Mr. Dobbins: Ichirō Nagai
- Joe Harper: Kazuhiko Inoue
- Sheriff Collins: Taimei Suzuki
- Widow Douglas: Keiko Kuge, Barbara Goodson in English dub.
- Dr. Michael Mitchell: Tadao Futami in Japanese, Michael Forest in English dub.
- Dr. Helmen: Mike Reynolds in English dub.
- Lisette Jean
- Prosecutor: Richard Epcar in English dub.
- Peter (the cat)
- Caesar (the dog)

== Episodes ==
English episode titles from the 1988 Saban dub are listed in parentheses.

#	Title	Original Air Date
01	The Small World of Tom Sawyer (トムとハックとブタ騒動, Tomu to Hakku to buta sōdō) ("Tom's Wild Pig Chase")	January 6, 1980
02	A Fun Punishment (ごきげんなペンキ塗り, Gokigen'na Penki nuri) ("The Whitewashing Party")	January 13, 1980
03	Love At First Sight (トム一目ぼれをする, Tomu hitomebore o suru) ("Love at First Sight")	January 20, 1980
04	The Magic Spell (サムじいさんのおまじない, Samu-jī-san no Omajinai) ("Turning on the Charm")	January 27, 1980
05	Becky (恋は異なもの味なもの, Koha kotona Mono ajina Mono) ("Tom's First Date")	February 3, 1980
06	Huck's House (ハックの家づくり, Hakku no ie dukuri) ("Home Sweet Huck")	February 10, 1980
07	The Rival (ライバル登場, Raibaru-tōjō) ("Tom Meets His Match")	February 17, 1980
08	Panic at Board (あこがれの蒸気船, Akogare no jōkisen) ("The Stowaways")	February 24, 1980
09	Aunt Polly is Sick (ポリーおばさんの子供たち, Pōri-oba-san no Kodomo-tachi) ("The Impossible Promise")	March 2, 1980
10	Injun Joe (村の嫌われ者, Mura no kiraware Mono). ("The Secret of the Buried Treasure")	March 9, 1980
11	The Treasure (海賊の宝, Kaizoku no Takara) ("X Marks the Spot")	March 16, 1980
12	The Professor (ベッキー・サッチャー怒る, Bekkī Satchā ikaru) ("Tom's Broken Engagement")	March 23, 1980
13	The Pirates (海賊になるんだ, Kaizoku ni narun'da) ("A Pirates Life for Tom")	March 30, 1980
14	Pirates Don't Go To School (海賊には学校はない, Kaizoku ni wa gakkō wa nai) ("No school for Pirates")	April 6, 1980
15	Poor Aunt Polly (冒険・冒険また冒険, Bōken; bōken mata bōken) ("Tom Steals Home")	April 13, 1980
16	The Funeral (トム・ソーヤーの葬式, Tōmu Sōyā no sōshiki) ("Pirates at Their Own Funeral")	April 20, 1980
17	Back to School (運の悪い日, Hako no warui nichi) ("Tom's Moment of Glory")	April 27, 1980
18	Reconciliation (痛い仲直り, Itai naka naori) ("For the Love of Becky")	May 4, 1980
19	The Frog Race (蛙の戦い, Kaeru no Tatakai) ("The Great Frog Leaping Contest")	May 11, 1980
20	The Secret of Mr. Dobbins (ドビンズ先生の秘密, Dobinzu-sensei no Himitsu) ("Mr. Dobbins Flips His Wig")	May 18, 1980
21	The Summer Holidays (夏休みの始まり, Natsuyasumi no Hajimari) ("No Time for Mumps")	May 25, 1980
22	The Charlatan (病気にならない薬, Byōki ni naranai kusuri) (Tom's Bad Medicine")	June 1, 1980
23	Fishing Party (ナマズ釣りの日, Namazu tsuri no Nichi) ("Tom and Becky's Big Catch")	June 15, 1980
24	Huck Wears a Tie (ネクタイをしたハック, Nekutai o shita Hakku) ("Huck's Un"suit"able Offer")	June 22, 1980
25	A Stubborn Boy (意地っぱり野郎, Ijippari Yarō) ("All Washed Up")	June 29, 1980
26	Lisette (子役のリゼット, Koyaku no Rizetto)	July 6, 1980
27	The Rising of the Curtain (お芝居の始まるまで, O-shibai no Hajimaru made)	July 20, 1980
28	Help Lisette! (リゼットを助けろ！, Rizetto o tasukero!)	July 27, 1980
29	Goodbye Lisette (突然のさようなら, Totsuzen no Sayōnara)	August 3, 1980
30	Huck's Father (ハックの父親, Hakku no Chichioya)	August 10, 1980
31	The Candlestick (数を数えろ, Kazu o kazoero)	August 17, 1980
32	Gold in Petersburg (黄金を見つけた！, Ōgon o mitsuketa!)	August 24, 1980
33	Escape to Freedom (自由に向かって逃げろ, Jiyū ni mukatte nigero)	September 7, 1980
34	The Man who Came from the Sky (天から降ってきた男, Ten kara futte kita otoko)	September 14, 1980
35	Tom wants to Fly (空を飛びたい, Sora o tobitai)	September 21, 1980
36	Fixing the Balloon (気球を直そう, Kikyū o naosō)	September 28, 1980
37	Goodbye Arthur (空からの眺め, Sora kara no nagame)	October 5, 1980
38	The Accident (おそろしい出来事, Osoroshī dekigoto)	October 12, 1980
39	A Question of Confidence (良心の痛み, Ryōshin no Itami)	October 19, 1980
40	The Trial (マフ・ポッターの裁判, Mafu Pottā no Saiban)	October 26, 1980
41	Where is Injun Joe? (インジャン・ジョーの行方, Injan Jō no namegata)	November 2, 1980
42	A Pleasant Journey (楽しい船の旅, Tanoshī fune no tabi)	November 9, 1980
43	The White Horse (白い馬を見た, Shiroi uma o mita)	November 16, 1980
44	The Capture (稲妻をつかまえろ, Inazuma o tsukamaero)	November 23, 1980
45	Freedom (さらば白馬よ, Saraba hakuba yo)	November 30, 1980
46	The Haunted House (化物屋敷で, Bakemono yashiki de)	December 7, 1980
47	The Cave (マクドウガルの洞窟, Makudōgaru no Dōkutsu)	December 14, 1980
48	The Death of Injun Joe (インジャン・ジョーの最後, Injan Jō no Saigo)	December 21, 1980
49	The Sad Ending (格好のわるい終りかた, Kakkō no warui Owari kata)	December 28, 1980

== International titles ==
- As aventuras de Tom Sawyer (Portuguese)
- De avonturen van Tom Sawyer (Dutch)
- Las Aventuras de Tom Sawyer (Spanish)
- Le avventure di Tom Sawyer (Italian)
- Les Aventures de Tom Sawyer (French)
- Przygody Tomka Sawyera (Polish)
- Tom Sawyer (Spanish)
- Tom Sawyer no Bōken (Japanese)
- Tom Sawyers Abenteuer (German)
- Tom Sawyerin ja Huckleberry Finnin seikkailut (Finnish)
- Tom Story (Italian)
- תום סוייר (Hebrew)
- توم سوير (Arabic)
- ماجراهای تام سایر (Persian)
- トム・ソーヤーの冒険 (Japanese)
- 湯姆歷險記 (Chinese (Taiwan))
- 톰 소여의 모험 (Korean)
- Приключения Тома Сойера (Russian)

== Reception ==
- Awarded Best Film Award for TV by the Children's Cultural Affairs Agency, Government of Japan
