= Doraemon: What Am I for Momotarō? =

1981 film by Takeyuki Kanda

- Theatrical release poster
- Kanji: ドラえもん ぼく、桃太郎のなんなのさ
- Revised Hepburn: Doraemon Boku, Momotarou no Nan'na no Sa
- Directed by: Takeyuki Kanda
- Screenplay by: Noboru Shiroyama
- Based on: Doraemon by Fujiko Fujio
- Produced by: Sōichi Besshi; Tetsuo Sugano
- Starring: Nobuyo Ōyama; Noriko Ohara; Michiko Nomura; Kaneta Kimotsuki; Kazuya Tatekabe; Sachiko Chijimatsu; Masayuki Katō; Takashi Kuwabara; Teiji Ōmiya
- Edited by: Hajime Okayasu
- Music by: Shunsuke Kikuchi
- Production company: Shin-Ei Animation
- Distributed by: Toho
- Release date: August 1, 1981 (Japan)
- Running time: 46 minutes
- Country: Japan
- Language: Japanese
- Box office: $3 million

Doraemon: What Am I for Momotarō? (ドラえもん ぼく、桃太郎のなんなのさ, Doraemon Boku, Momotarou no Nan'na no Sa) is a 1981 Japanese animated science fiction comedy-drama short film.

It premiered in Japan on August 1, 1981 (Note: In the Osaka area, it released two weeks earlier on July 18, 1981.) on a double feature with 21 Emon: Welcome to Space!.

It is largely an expanded and modified version of the 1975 Doraemon, Bakeru-kun, and Another Story chapter "What Am I for Momotaro?", albeit removing all Bakeru-kun elements and characters.

== Synopsis ==
For his school's summer vacation homework assignment, Nobita decides to research his town's history. He uses Doraemon's secret gadget, the "Time Camera", to photograph the past, but to his surprise, it captures the image of Momotarō and his companions hauling a cart full of treasure.

Meanwhile, a small picture held by a man named Dutch, a foreigner who Nobita's mother Tamako had just met, happens to depict a samurai dressed just like Momotarō, with the photograph-like picture having been passed down through Dutch's family for generations.

Thinking Momotarō might have been a real person, Nobita and Doraemon both go back in time to past Japan alongside Shizuka, Suneo, and Gian.

== Cast ==
An unofficial English version, produced and released exclusively in Malaysia by Speedy Video, features an unknown voice cast.

| Character | Japanese voice actor |
|---|---|
| Doraemon | Nobuyo Ōyama |
| Nobita Nobi | Noriko Ohara |
| Shizuka Minamoto | Michiko Nomura |
| Suneo Honekawa | Kaneta Kimotsuki |
| Takeshi "Gian" Gōda | Kazuya Tatekabe |
| Tamako Nobi | Sachiko Chijimatsu |
| Nobisuke Nobi | Masayuki Katō |
| Dutch | Takashi Kuwabara |
| Grandma | Sachiko Chijimatsu |
| Grandpa | Masayuki Katō |
| Oni | Teiji Ōmiya |
| Village Chief | Mahito Tsujimura |
| Villagers | Reizō Nomoto; Toku Nishio; Kazuhiko Inoue; Ritsuo Sawa |
| 21 Emon | Kazuhiko Inoue |

== Production ==
The first Doraemon feature film, Doraemon: Nobita's Dinosaur released in March 1980, followed by Doraemon: The Records of Nobita, Spaceblazer in March 1981. Five months after Spaceblazer however, Doraemon: What Am I for Momotarō? released as a summer holiday film (making 1981 a year with two Doraemon films), but because it was the sole exception to the tradition of March releases for Doraemon feature films until 2020's Doraemon: Nobita's New Dinosaur, it is often distinguished as a short film.

The title is a play on the catchphrase "What are you to her?" (あんた、あの娘のなんなのさ?) from the hit 1975 Japanese rock song "Port of Yoko, Yokohama, Yokosuka" (港のヨーコ ヨコハマ ヨコスカ).

== Soundtrack ==
=== Theme songs ===
"I'm Doraemon" (ぼくドラえもん)
Lyrics: Fujiko Fujio / Composition and Arrangement: Shunsuke Kikuchi / Vocals: Nobuyo Ōyama, Koorogi '73
"Blue Sky in the Pocket" (青い空はポケットさ)
Lyrics: Hiroo Takada / Composition and Arrangement: Shunsuke Kikuchi / Vocals: Kumiko Ōsugi

=== Insert song ===
"Doraemon's Song" (ドラえもんのうた)
Lyrics: Takumi Kusube / Composition and Arrangement: Shunsuke Kikuchi / Vocals: Kumiko Ōsugi

== Release ==
The short film was released in Japan on August 1, 1981.

It screened theatrically in a double feature with the 21 Emon film 21 Emon: Welcome to Space!.

In 2015, to celebrate the 35th anniversary of the Doraemon movie series and in commemoration of the theatrical release of Doraemon: Nobita's Space Heroes, What Am I for Momotarō? was screened with Doraemon feature films from Doraemon: Nobita's Dinosaur to Doraemon: Nobita in the New Haunts of Evil ~Peko and the Five Explorers~ and other theatrical Doraemon short films at the "Doraemon the Movie Festival", held at the Jinbōchō Theater from January 31 to March 6.

=== Streaming ===
In 2024, for the occasion of the 90th anniversary of Fujiko F. Fujio, Doraemon: What Am I for Momotarō? alongside numerous animated short films of Doraemon, Perman, Esper Mami, and Chimpui were made available to stream on Prime Video in Japan as the "Fujiko F. Fujio's 90th Anniversary Film Masterpiece Selection".

== Reception ==
=== Box office reception ===
Because the short film was screened as a double feature with 21 Emon: Welcome to Space!, it grossed ¥500 million yen ($3 million) at the Japan box office.
