= Masayuki Katō =

Japanese actor and voice actor (1932–1993)

- 加藤 正之
- Born: Masayuki Katō (加藤 正之); January 29, 1932; Kokura, Fukuoka Prefecture, Japan
- Died: March 18, 1993 (aged 61); Edogawa, Tokyo, Japan
- Occupations: Actor; voice actor
- Years active: 1950–1992
- Agent: Mausu Promotion

Masayuki Katō (加藤 正之, Katō Masayuki; January 29, 1932 – March 18, 1993) was a Japanese actor and voice actor affiliated with Mausu Promotion.

== Biography ==
Born on January 29, 1932, Katō graduated from Waseda University.

After working with the NHK Kitakyushu Broadcasting Station and the NHK Fukuoka Broadcasting Theatre Company, Katō joined Mausu Promotion, known at the time as Ezaki Productions.

He primarily portrayed middle-aged men on stage and in television dramas on networks such as NHK.

Katō was also a voice actor who dubbed for foreign films and did voice acting for anime, with his role as Nobita's father Nobisuke Nobi in Doraemon being his most famous, popular role.

In October 1992, Katō stepped down from the role of Nobisuke due to health problems, with his close friend Yōsuke Naka assuming the role.

=== Death ===
Katō died at a hospital in Edogawa, Tokyo from cancer on March 18, 1993, at the age of 61.

== Personality ==
His specialty was the Kyushu dialect.

He was known for having a gentle personality, and since he only had a few scenes in Doraemon, he would often brew coffee in the studio lobby and serve it to the other cast members.

== Successors ==
Following Katō stepping down due to ill health and his subsequent death, the following individuals have taken over some of his voice acting roles.

Successor	Character	Work	Debut
Yōsuke Naka	Nobisuke Nobi	Doraemon	Episode broadcast on October 23, 1992
Yōsuke Naka	Fat Cat	Chip 'n Dale: Rescue Rangers	New dubbed version
Naoki Tamanoi	Fat Cat	Chip 'n Dale: Rescue Rangers	Chip 'n Dale: Rescue Rangers
Tetsuo Mizutori	Osamu Fukai	Cooking Papa	Episode broadcast on October 8, 1992
Tesshō Genda	Rain Demon	Let's Go! Anpanman	Let's Go! Anpanman: The Pyramid of the Rainbow
Katsuhisa Hōki	Rain Demon	Let's Go! Anpanman	TBA
Hisao Egawa	Jackal	Fist of the North Star	Fist of the North Star: End of the Century Savior Legend
Takehiro Koyama	Sarek	Journey to Babel	Additional dubbed version (digitally remastered)
Binbin Takaoka	Carmine Ricca	Magnum Force TV Asahi version	Additional dubbing for the WOWOW version
Ken'ichi Inoue	Father William O'Malley	The Delta Force	Full-voice version: additional dubbing

== Filmography ==
=== Television series ===
List of performances in television series
Year	Title	Role	Notes	Source
1970	Onihei Hankachō	Police officer	Ep. 44	
1971	Special Mobile Investigation Unit	Yoshikawa		
1971	Onihei Hankachō	Innkeeper		
1974	Katsu Kaishū	Vassal		
1976	Kaze to Kumo to Niji to	Soldier		
1978	Ōgon no Hibi	Fukushima Masanori		
1978	Saturday Drama: The Seicho Matsumoto Series: Memories of Fire	Tsune Eira's son		
1979	Kusa Moeru	Shibuya Takashige, Thief		
1979	The Barren Zone	Prime Minister's Secretary		
1980	The Age of the Lion	Entourage		
1982	Portraits at the Pass	Ōtomo Ōmi no Kami		
1983	Tokugawa Ieyasu	Hidetoshi Oda		
1985	Haru no Hatō	The Kawakami family		
1986	Life	Matchmaker		
1988	Takeda Shingen	Flag Commissioner		
1991	Taiheiki	Warrior		

=== Theatrical films ===
List of performances in theatrical films
Year	Title	Role	Notes	Source
1970	Yawara no Hoshi	Police Station Chief		
1977	Koshoku Genpei Emaki	Additional role		

=== Special effects ===
List of performances in special effects
Year	Title	Role	Notes	Source
1971	Kamen Rider	Guard, Shigekazu Mikami	Guard in Ep. 9, Shigekazu Mikami in Ep. 77	
1988	Big Bird in Japan	Restaurant Manager	Television special	

=== Television animation ===
List of voice performances in television animation
Year	Title	Role	Notes	Source
1968	Sasuke	Saruhiko		
1973	Aim for the Ace!	Sōichirō Ryūzaki		
1973	Jungle Kurobe	Additional voice		
1974	Karate Master	Gang Boss	Ep. 28	
1974	Vicky the Viking	Sven the Terrible		
1974	Kōya no Shōnen Isamu	Additional voice		
1976	3000 Leagues in Search of Mother	Additional voice		
1976	Reideen the Brave	Ra Mu		
1976	Little Lulu and Her Little Friends	George Moppet		
1977	Nobody's Boy: Remi	Additional voice		
1977	Star of the Giants	Additional voice		
1977	Voltes V	General Dangé		
1977	Invincible Super Man Zambot 3	Anzai, Commander Buncher, Defense Commander, Gasman, Soldier		
1977	Wakakusa no Charlotte	Manager		
1977	Angie Girl	Mad		
1978	King Fang	Cowboy		
1978	The Story of Perrine	The Farmer, Benoît, Additional voice		
1978	Invincible Steel Man Daitarn 3	Bancher, Gasman, Staff A		
1978	Song of Baseball Enthusiasts	Wang, Principal Shirayuki, Kitanoji's father		
1979	Cyborg 009	Gingal	Ep. 28	
1979	New Giant Star II	Additional voice		
1979–92	Doraemon	Nobisuke Nobi, Sensei, Yoshio Minamoto	First voice of Nobisuke Nobi, Second voice of Sensei and Yoshio Minamoto	
1979	The Adventures of the Little Prince	King		
1979–80	Lupin the 3rd Part II	FBI Director, Superintendent General	FBI Director in Ep. 70, Superintendent General in Ep. 141	
1980	Ashita no Joe	Doctor, Otaka Clinic Doctor	Doctor in Ep. 1, Otaka Clinic Doctor in Ep. 22	
1980	Fisherman Sanpei	Chairman		
1980	Astro Boy	Prime Minister, Soldier, Scientist B	Prime Minister in Ep. 1, Soldier in Ep. 41, Scientist B in Ep. 52	
1981	The Monster Kid	Funyako Funyao		
1981	Hello! Sandybell	Nahara		
1981	Dogtanian and the Three Muskehounds	Stable Hand, Planchet		
1982	Gyakuten! Ippatsuman	Bluff		
1983	Cat's Eye	Additional voice		
1983	Serendipity the Pink Dragon	Additional voice		
1984	Fist of the North Star	Jackal, Garzus	Jackal in Eps. 11–13, Garzus in Ep. 61	
1985	Lupin the 3rd Part III	Additional voice		
1988	Kiteretsu Daihyakka	Janitor		
1988–present	Let's Go! Anpanman	Rain Demon, Fuketuman, Dog Race Announcer, Uncle Bull	First voice of Rain Demon, Fourth voice of Uncle Bull	
1989	Kimba the White Lion	Additional voice		
1989	The Laughing Salesman	President		
1990	Magical Hat	The Neighborhood Brat		
1991	21 Emon	Inspector, President, Yorimasa in third place		
1992	Cooking Papa	Osamu Fukai	First voice	

=== Theatrical animation ===
List of voice performances in theatrical animation
Year	Title	Role	Notes	Source
1979	Lupin the 3rd: The Castle of Cagliostro	Forger, French Delegate		
1980	Doraemon: Nobita's Dinosaur	Nobisuke Nobi, Mr. Gakeshita, Time Patrol Squad member		
1981	Doraemon: The Records of Nobita, Spaceblazer	Nobisuke Nobi		
1981	Doraemon: What Am I for Momotarō?	Nobisuke Nobi, Grandpa	Short film	
1982	Doraemon: Nobita and the Haunts of Evil	Nobisuke Nobi		
1983	Doraemon: Nobita and the Castle of the Undersea Devil	Nobisuke Nobi		
1984	Doraemon: Nobita's Great Adventure into the Underworld	Nobisuke Nobi		
1985	Doraemon: Nobita's Little Star Wars	Freedom Alliance Member		
1986	Grey Digital Target	Leo		
1986	Doraemon: Nobita and the Steel Troops	Nobisuke Nobi		
1986	Fist of the North Star	Additional voice		
1987	Doraemon: Nobita and the Knights on Dinosaurs	Manager		
1988	Doraemon: The Record of Nobita's Parallel Visit to the West	Nobisuke Nobi		
1988	Akira	Committee member		
1988	Raining Fire	Vice-principal		
1989	City Hunter: .357 Magnum	Ambassador Bondar		
1989	Doraemon: Nobita and the Birth of Japan	Nobisuke Nobi		
1990	Uncle Remodelling Course	Chairman Kamaishi		
1990	Doraemon: Nobita and the Animal Planet	Police Commander		
1991	Doraemon: Nobita's Dorabian Nights	Merchant A		
1991	Dorami-chan: Wow, The Kid Gang of Bandits!	Nobihei's father	Short film	
1991	Nadia: The Secret of Blue Water: The Motion Picture	German Admiral		
1992	Doraemon: Nobita and the Kingdom of Clouds	Nobisuke Nobi	Final film role	

=== Original video animation (OVA) ===
List of voice performances in original video animation
Year	Title	Role	Notes	Source
1984	Special Armored Battalion Dorvack	Fred Beans		
1987	Taiman Blues: Shimizu Naoto Hen	Additional voice		
1987	Metal Skin Panic MADOX-01	Commander		
1988	Wounded Man	Doctor		
1989	Legend of the Galactic Heroes	Klopstock's Vassal	Ep. 9	
1989	Davide no Hoshi	Genpei Hirukawa	Episodes 1–2	
1989	Star Cat Fullhouse	Energy Agency Director		
1991	Baku Yumemakura's Twilight Theatre	Shop Owner		
1991	Izumo	Additional voice		
1992	Sohryuden: Legend of the Dragon Kings	Additional voice		

=== Narration ===
- The Glorious Zero Fighter: Tragic Wings Scattered Over the Ocean (1994)
