= Yoshiko Matsuo =

Japanese voice actress (born 1944)

- 松尾 佳子
- Born: Yoshiko Kobayashi (小林 佳子) (née Yoshiko Matsuo (松尾 佳子)); March 5, 1944 (age 82); Chūō City, Tokyo, Japan
- Occupations: Voice actress; narrator
- Years active: 1950–present
- Agent: Sigma Seven
- Notable credits: Mach GoGoGo as Michi Shimura; The Swiss Family Robinson: Flone of the Mysterious Island as Flone Robinson; Aria as Akino "Grandma" Ametsuchi; Smile PreCure! as Tae Hoshizora; Blue Exorcist as Shiemi's Grandmother; The Adventures of Tom Sawyer as Penny Phelps; Crayon Shin-chan as John Yamada; Invincible Super Man Zambot 3 as Keiko Kamikita; Keroppi and Friends as Keroppi Hasunoue
- Spouse: 1
- Children: 1
- Website: Official profile

Yoshiko Matsuo (松尾 佳子, Matsuo Yoshiko; born March 5, 1944), is a Japanese voice actress and narrator affiliated with Sigma Seven.

She is best known for her anime voice roles as Michi Shimura in Mach GoGoGo, Flone Robinson in The Swiss Family Robinson: Flone of the Mysterious Island, Akino "Grandma" Ametsuchi in Aria, Tae Hoshizora in Smile PreCure!, Shiemi's Grandmother in Blue Exorcist, Penny Phelps in The Adventures of Tom Sawyer, John Yamada in Crayon Shin-chan, and Keiko Kamikita in Invincible Super Man Zambot 3.

She is also very well known in Japan for being the Japanese voice actress of the Sanrio character Keroppi Hasunoue in various Hello Kitty and numerous productions since 1989.

== Biography ==
Born on March 5, 1944 in Chūō City, Tokyo, she moved to Shinjuku Ward, Tokyo when she was in third grade.

At eight years old in third grade, she joined the Komadori Theater Company after being encouraged by her homeroom teacher.

After attending Chūō City Nihonbashi Elementary School and Shinjuku City Ochiai 2nd Elementary School, Matsuo went to Shinjuku City Ochiai Junior High School and graduated from Otsuma High School. She had been previously affiliated with Theater Echo and the Tokyo Actor's Consumer's Cooperative Society.

== Personal life ==
She is married and has a son.

As of 1985, Maya Okamoto has lived in the same neighborhood as Matsuo.

=== Features ===
Matsuo's vocal range is mezzo-soprano. She primarily does voice acting for anime and narration.

== Filmography ==
=== Television dramas ===
List of performances in television dramas
Year	Title	Role	Notes	Source
1961	Tokubetsu Kidō Sōsatai	Chiyo	Ep. 137	

=== Television animation ===
List of voice performances in television animation
Year	Title	Role	Notes	Source
1963	Wolf Boy Ken	Additional voice		
1963	Astro Boy	Additional voice		
1965	Space Boy Soran	Mika Kozuki		
1965	Jungle Emperor Leo	Lyre		
1965	Marine Boy	Neptune, Erika		
1966	Sally the Witch	Mitsuko, Hitomi		
1966	Rainbow Sentai Robin	Marguerite		
1967	Oraa Guzura Dado	Tin		
1967	Mach GoGoGo	Mitchi Shimura	First voice, Eps 1–4	
1968	Dokachin the Primitive Boy	Additional voice		
1968	Animal 1	Harumi Hanamura		
1968	Star of the Giants	Mina Hadaka		
1969	Marine Boy	Neptune		
1969	Moomin	Ninni, Elisa		
1970	The Adventures of Hutch the Honeybee	Flower		
1970	Norakuro	Miko-chan		
1971	Anderson Monogatari	Maria, Eliza	Maria in Ep. 34, Eliza in Eps 45–47	
1971	Marvelous Melmo	Hitomi		
1972	Astroganger	Yuri		
1972	Pinocchio: The Series	Lucia		
1972	The Gutsy Frog	Additional voice		
1973	Kōya no Shōnen Isamu	Additional voice		
1973	Jungle Kurobe	Additional voice		
1974	Jim Button	Pocco		
1974	The Song of Tentomushi	Mizuo Isshuu	Second voice	
1974	Hoshi no Ko Chobin	Chirochon		
1975	The Adventures of Pepero	Kayna		
1975	Dog of Flanders	Alois	Ep. 12	
1975	Maya the Honey Bee	Fairy, Great Black Wasp		
1976	3000 Leagues in Search of Mother	Marco Rossi		
1976	Chōdenji Robo Combattler V	Hyōma Aoi	childhood	
1976	Paul's Miraculous Adventure	Merari, Cream		
1977	Rascal the Raccoon	Theodora "Theo" North		
1977	Monarch: The Big Bear of Tallac	Ran		
1977	Jetter Mars	Miri		
1977	Invincible Super Man Zambot 3	Keiko Kamikita		
1977	Yatterman	Pero		
1977	Angie Girl	Prince Harold		
1977	Song of Baseball Enthusiasts	Nobuko Muto		
1978	Galaxy Express 999	Flyer, Young Woman, Artemis, Rhea, Elsa, Miikun	Miikun in Ep. 37	
1978	The Adventures of the Little Prince	Rose Girl		
1978	Invincible Steel Man Daitarn 3	Tally		
1979	Anne of Green Gables	Miss Harris		
1979	Josephina the Whale	Shura		
1979	New Star of the Giants II	Mina Hadaka		
1979	Zenderman	Hans		
1979	Gatchaman Fighter	Rita		
1979	The Rose of Versailles	Louis Joseph, Queen Maria Theresa		
1980	Galaxy Express 999: Can You Love Like a Mother!?	Artemis	Television special	
1980	The Adventures of Tom Sawyer	Penny Phelps		
1980	Invincible Robo Trider G7	Ryūsuke		
1980	Fisherman Sanpei	Treetop		
1981	Ai no Gakko Cuore Monogatari	Marco		
1981	The Swiss Family Robinson: Flone of the Mysterious Island	Flone Robinson (Rebecca)		
1981	GoShogun	Isabelle Cronkite		
1982	Little Pollon	Daphne		
1982	Call of the Wild	Additional voice		
1983	Fushigi no Kuni no Alice	Lorina Hannah Liddell		
1984	Noozles	Lady Gabriella, Kangaroo Mother		
1984	Doraemon	Hoi	Ep. 776	
1984	Katri, Girl of the Meadows	Miina		
1984	Sherlock Hound	Wheelie	Ep. 16	
1987	Mami the Psychic	Takechou's mother, The Principal, Imai's mother, Akihiko, Kaori's mother		
1987	Oraa Guzura Dado	Tin		
1988–present	Let's Go! Anpanman	S-Kun	First voice	
1988	Oishinbo	Fumie Kurita, Mrs. Koizumi	Second voice of Fumie Kurita	
1989	Little Princelling	Middle-Aged Woman		
1993	Crayon Shin-chan	John Yamada		
1993	Daisuki! Hello Kitty	Keroppi Hasunoue		
1994	Let's Play!! Hello Kitty	Keroppi Hasunoue		
1999	Kyorochan	Hageta Chibimaru		
2001	Great Detective Conan	Yaeko Kamei	Eps 215–216	
2005	Aria the Origination	Akino Ametsuchi		
2007	Kono Aozora ni Yakusoku o: Yōkoso Tsugumi Ryō e	Natsue Hoshino		
2007	Darker than Black	Madam Stargazer		
2007	Myself ; Yourself	Kajii		
2008	Koihime Musō	Grandma		
2008	Porphy no Nagai Tabi	Daisy		
2011–2025	Blue Exorcist	Shiemi's grandmother		
2011–2013	Tamayura	Kaede's grandmother		
2012	Smile PreCure!	Tae Hoshizora		
2015	Aria the Avvenire	Akino Ametsuchi		
2026	Ichijyoma Mankitsu Gurashi!	Grandma of Guam	Debuts in Ep. 4	

=== Theatrical animation ===
List of voice performances in theatrical animation
Year	Title	Role	Note	Source
1965	Space Boy Soran	Additional voice		
1966	Kimba the White Lion	Additional voice		
1970	Star of the Giants: Big League Ball	Additional voice		
1972	Moomin	Additional voice		
1980	3000 Leagues in Search of Mother	Marco Rossi		
1980	Nobody's Boy: Remi	Arthur		
1982	GoShogun	Isabelle		
1989	My Melody's Little Red Riding Hood	Additional voice		
1989	Kiki and Lala's Blue Bird	Additional voice		
1990	Pokopon's Journey to the West	Additional voice		
1990	Kero Kero Keroppi's Big Adventure: The Magic Bean Tree	Keroppi Hasunoue		
1990	Taabo's Great Adventure on Planet Ryugu	Additional voice		
1991	Kero Kero Keroppi's Three Musketeers	D'Artagnan (Keroppi Hasunoue)		
1991	Fly! Peek the Whale	Additional voice		
1992	Doraemon: Nobita and the Kingdom of Clouds	Hoi		
1996	Kero Kero Keroppi's Surprise! Haunted House	Keroppi Hasunoue		
2000	The Sun's Laws: The Way to El Cantare	Prajapati		
2005	xxxHolic: A Midsummer Night's Dream	Old Lady		
2006	The Laws of Eternity	Prajāpati		
2015	Tamayura: Graduation Photo Part 1 - Kizashi -	Kaede's grandmother		
2015	Tamayura: Graduation Photo Part 2 - Hibiki -	Kaede's grandmother		
2016	Tamayura: Graduation Photo Part 4 - Ashita -	Kaede's grandmother		
2017	Crayon Shin-chan: Invasion!! Alien Shiriri	John Yamada		
2021	Aria the Crepuscoloe	Akino Ametsuchi		
2023	New Dimension! Crayon Shin-chan the Movie: Battle of Supernatural Powers ~Flying Sushi~	John Yamada		

=== Original video animation (OVA) ===
List of voice performances in original video animation
Year	Title	Role	Notes	Source
1991–1996	Legend of the Galactic Heroes	Hortense Milbelle		
1992	Kero Kero Keroppi's Having Friends is Great	Keroppi Hasunoue		
1992	Kero Kero Keroppi's A Dinosaur Appeared!	Keroppi Hasunoue		
1992	Kero Kero Keroppi's Flying Dream Ship	Keroppi Hasunoue		
1992	Kero Kero Keroppi's Do Your Best! Keroppies	Keroppi Hasunoue		
1992	Kero Kero Keroppi's The Christmas Eve Gift	Keroppi Hasunoue		
1993	Kero Kero Keroppi's Great Honeybee Commotion	Keroppi Hasunoue		
1993	Kero Kero Keroppi's The Great Adventure of the Cowardly Prince	Keroppi Hasunoue		
1993	Kero Kero Keroppi's Our Princess	Keroppi Hasunoue		
1993	Kero Kero Keroppi's Kero Kero House's Secret	Keroppi Hasunoue		
1993	Kero Kero Keroppi's Friend is a Wizard	Keroppi Hasunoue		
1993	Kero Kero Keroppi's Gulliver Adventure	Gulliver (Keroppi Hasunoue)		
1994	Kero Kero Keroppi's Our Treasures	Keroppi Hasunoue		
1994	Kero Kero Keroppi's If I Could Fly in the Sky	Keroppi Hasunoue		
1994	Kero Kero Keroppi's Let's Be Friends	Keroppi Hasunoue		
1994	Kero Kero Keroppi's Robin Hood	Robin Hood (Keroppi Hasunoue)		
2000	Legend of the Galactic Heroes: Spiral Labyrinth	Hortense Milbelle		
2000	Kitty and Daniel's Wonderful Christmas	Additional voice		
2001	Hello Kitty in The Little Match Girl	Grandmother		
2001	Kero Kero Keroppi's Aladdin and the Magic Lamp	Aladdin (Keroppi Hasunoue)		
2007	Aria the OVA: Arietta	Akino Ametsuchi		
2010	Tamayura	Fū's grandmother		
2015	Tamayura: Sotsugyō Shashin	Fū's grandmother		

=== Video games ===
List of voice performances in video games
Year	Title	Role	Source
1991	Secret Treasure Legend: The Adventure of Chris	Philia, Kachua	
1994	Megaton Arms: Iron Tournament	Armor Guard	
2002	Super Robot Wars IMPACT	Keiko Kamikita	
2006	Aria The Natural: Mirage of a Distant Memory	Grandma	
2006	Crayon Shin-Chan: The Legend Called: The Bonus Capital Shock Gahn!	John Yamada	
2008	Super Robot Wars A Portable	Keiko Kamikita	
2008	Super Robot Wars Z	Keiko Kamikita	
2010	Crayon Shin-chan: Shokkugan! The Legendary Bonus Butt Battle!!	John Yamada	
2011	2nd Super Robot Wars Z: Hakai-Hen	Keiko Kamikita	
2012	2nd Super Robot Wars Z: Reisei-Hen	Keiko Kamikita	
2015	3rd Super Robot Wars Z: Heavenly Prison Chapter	Keiko Kamikita	
2017	Super Robot Wars V	Keiko Kamikita	

=== Drama CD ===
List of drama CD performances
Year	Title	Role	Label	Catalogue number	Source
2012	Ayatsuri Pierrot no Monogatari	Elena (Old Woman)	SMD Itaku	KDSD-00560	

=== Dubbing ===
==== Feature films ====
List of overseas dubbing performances in feature films
Title	Role	Notes	Source
Casino Royale	Mata Bond/James Bond (Joanna Pettet)	1972 NTV edition	
