= Doraemon: Nobita and the Haunts of Evil =

1982 film by Hideo Nishimaki

Doraemon the Movie: Nobita and the Haunts of Evil
- Theatrical release poster
- Kanji: ドラえもん: のび太の大魔境
- Revised Hepburn: Doraemon: Nobita no Daimakyō
- Directed by: Hideo Nishimaki
- Screenplay by: Fujiko Fujio
- Based on: Doraemon's Long Tales: Noby's Uncharted World by Fujiko Fujio
- Produced by: Sōichi Besshi; Tetsuo Kanno
- Starring: Nobuyo Ōyama; Noriko Ohara; Michiko Nomura; Kaneta Kimotsuki; Kazuya Tatekabe; Mari Shimizu; Kazuko Sugiyama; Masahiko Murase; Youko Kuri; Junpei Takiguchi; Ichirō Nagai
- Cinematography: Akiko Suzuki; Akira Koike
- Edited by: Kazuo Inoue; Masanori Sakamoto
- Music by: Shunsuke Kikuchi
- Production company: Shin-Ei Animation
- Distributed by: Toho
- Release date: 13 March 1982
- Running time: 91 minutes
- Country: Japan
- Language: Japanese
- Box office: $21.1 million

Doraemon: Nobita and the Haunts of Evil (ドラえもん: のび太の大魔境, Doraemon: Nobita no Daimakyō) is a 1982 Japanese animated science fiction adventure film based on the third volume of the same name of the Doraemon Long Stories series. It was released on 13 March 1982 in Japan. It's the 3rd Doraemon film and was animated by Shin-Ei Animation. A remake of this film was released on March 8, 2014, entitled Doraemon: Nobita in the New Haunts of Evil ~ Peko and the Five Explorers ~. It is partially inspired by the 1980 chapter "Nobita's Rescue Party".

== Plot ==
The film opens with an unidentified breed of dog walking in the streets of Tokyo and it seemingly magically able to convince a larger generic dog to run off. Meanwhile, Nobita gets told by Gian and Suneo to get them to go to an unexplored part of the world for their spring break. Nobita begs Doraemon to help after which he pulls a gadget to take pictures of the African continent. When his mother wanted him to run errands he encountered Peko wanting to help it, he gave him a sausage that he had brought from the market. The dog follows him, but Nobita tries to chase the dog away, fearing his mother will scold him because of her dislike of pets. But when his mother lost her purse, the dog helped her in finding said purse. To repay the dog's help, she agrees to keep the dog as a pet. After Nobita and Doraemon cleaned the dog, they named him Peko.

They left the house after Peko refused to go on a walk with them and knowing that it would be very difficult to handle too many pictures. However, Peko who stayed behind wanting to search through the pictures found a mysterious giant statue somewhere in the Democratic Republic of the Congo (at the time Zaire). After consulting with Dekisugi, he deduced that the area where the statue stands was never explored because there's always a thick fog around it, something that doesn't effect Doraemon's satellite pictures. Excited that they might have found something no one has discovered, Nobita, Doraemon, and all of their friends, including Shizuka, Gian, and Suneo, went on an expedition to find the statue.

After the first day of the expedition, Gian got annoyed by the group's overreliance on Doraemon's gadgets, including using the Anywhere Door and the group hindering several wild animals with them, and angrily went off vowing to not return. In the same night, however, he was visited by the mysterious statue in his bedroom, who tells him about hidden treasures and asking him if he could truly call himself a man before disappearing. Interested, Gian rejoins the group the next day, but tells Doraemon to leave any gadgets that they used the day before. When they are cruising on a crocodile infested river with a ship, Gian fails to steer it properly causing the ship to crash into a rock. The Anywhere Door eaten by the crocodiles surrounding them right after being pulled out and afterwards the group was almost swarmed by crocodiles, but they got rescued by a group of natives, who takes them to the village. The natives know about the mysterious statue and told Doraemon that they have to go through a lion-infested savanna and a very deep gorge. This scares the group, but Gian claims that he isn't scared of such myths, which inadvertently angers the natives who believes doing so will curse their village and get chased out. That night, when the group camps and laments on their situation without some of Doraemon's gadgets, Gian accused them of blaming him and angrily storming off, but when Peko visits him, he breaks down crying.

When the group reaches the savanna, the mysterious statue appears again and drives the lions off. When they reached the bottom of the deep gorge and figured out the superstitions surrounding it, Peko, now fully trusting the group, reveals himself to be a prince of a kingdom of bipedal dogs with human intelligence. He told them that the minister Daburanda and his lackey Dr. Kos were planning to conquer the world, had assassinated the king and he attempted to kill Peko by sealing him in a coffin but he had escaped through the underground river in the gorge, causing him to meet Nobita. Doraemon and his friends decided to help him. First, they searched for Burusasu, one of Peko's loyal bodyguards, but found out he's arrested by Daburanda's soldiers. After helping a young puppy named Chippo, they free Burusasu from a prison, but Daburanda and his army commander, Saberu, realize that Peko had returned and began a search for him and Doraemon's group. Daburanda also reveals that he has princess Spiana captive in his palace.

While everyone is hiding from Daburanda's soldiers, Burusasu said there was a prophecy that, "When the world will be covered by darkness, 10 foreigners will come and move the statue's heart to save the palace.". Doraemon thinks the travelers are him, Nobita, Shizuka, Gian, and Suneo, but realizes there are only five of them. When Chippo is hungry, Doraemon uses the Anticipating Promise Machine to make everyone feel full, but they have to fulfill the promise the next day.

The next night, the group went to the statue, but was ambushed by Daburanda's soldiers. Burusasu faces the soldiers and lets Peko pass, but soon they got cornered by Dr. Kos and his aerial fleet. Peko was willing to hold the army back and let the group escape, but Gian follows him (possibly to punish himself for the trouble he caused everyone) and soon the entire group does. Finally, they all decided to get to the statue together, which is guarded by Daburanda, Saberu, and an army. When Nobita wonders about the old saying of ten travelers, Shizuka uses the Anticipating Promise Machine for help. Suddenly, the second group of Doraemon, Nobita, Shizuka, Gian, and Suneo appears, fully equipped with weapon gadgets, and fights Daburanda and his army while the main group enters the statue, followed by Saberu. When Nobita lags behind, Saberu catches up to him. Despite given the Denkomaru sword, Nobita takes a long time dueling the skilled Saberu before finally defeating him. The group fighting the army is also forced to retreat when Dr. Kos arrives with his aerial fleet.

Eventually, Peko and the rest of the group manage to reach the statue's heart, which is a mechanism to bring the statue 'alive' like a robot. Using it, Dr. Kos and the army were defeated, and Daburanda flees to the palace. He tried to bring princess Spiana with him, but Peko, using the statue, arrives in time and rescues her. Peko soon became the rightful ruler of the kingdom, and the other Doraemon gives the original Doraemon a new Anywhere Door to go home.

When the group came back home, they realized that they still have to fulfill one last the promise made from the Anticipating Promise Machine. The movie ends when they all head for the Time Machine to go back in time and help their past selves fight Daburanda's army and aid them in entering the statue.

== Cast ==
Character	Japanese voice actor
Doraemon	Nobuyo Ōyama
Nobita Nobi	Noriko Ohara
Shizuka Minamoto	Michiko Nomura
Takeshi "Gian" Gōda	Kazuya Tatekabe
Suneo Honekawa	Kaneta Kimotsuki
Hidetoshi Dekisugi	Sumiko Shirakawa
Tamako Nobi	Sachiko Chijimatsu
Nobisuke Nobi	Masayuki Katō
Mrs. Gōda	Kazuyo Aoki
Peko	Mari Shimizu
Chippo	Kazuko Sugiyama
Burusasu	Masahiko Murase
Spiana	Youko Kuri
Daburanda Minister	Junpei Takiguchi
Dr. Kos	Ichirō Nagai
Saberu	Hidekatsu Shibata
Maid	Miyoko Asō
Village headman	Yasuro Tanaka
Soldiers	Issei Futamata; Daisuke Gori; Fumio Matsuoka; Masaharu Satō; Bin Shimada

== See also ==
- List of Doraemon films
