= Doraemon: The Record of Nobita's Parallel Visit to the West =

1988 film by Tsutomu Shibayama

Doraemon the Movie: The Record of Nobita's Parallel Visit to the West
- Theatrical release poster
- Directed by: Tsutomu Shibayama
- Screenplay by: Ryo Motohira
- Based on: Doraemon by Fujiko Fujio F
- Produced by: Sōichi Besshi
- Starring: Nobuyo Ōyama; Noriko Ohara; Michiko Nomura; Kaneta Kimotsuki; Kazuya Tatekabe; Yuko Mizutani; Hidekatsu Shibata; Yōko Kuri
- Music by: Shunsuke Kikuchi
- Production company: Shin-Ei Animation
- Distributed by: Toho
- Release date: 12 March 1988
- Running time: 90 minutes
- Country: Japan
- Language: Japanese
- Box office: $21.1 million

Doraemon: The Record of Nobita's Parallel Visit to the West (のび太のパラレル西遊記, Doraemon: Nobita no Parareru saiyûki), also known as Doraemon's Parallel Journey to the West, is a 1988 Japanese animated science fantasy film which premiered on March 12, 1988, in Japan. This is the 9th Doraemon film. In the film, Nobita and his friends find themselves taking on the roles of characters from the 16th-century novel Journey to the West after demons from a game based on it escape and wreak havoc in the real world.

== Plot ==
At school, Nobita has a dream in which he is Sun Wukong facing off against The Buddha. Upon waking up, he finds his friends preparing for their upcoming school play, Journey to the West, with Shizuka playing Tang Sanzang, Gian as Zhu Bajie, and Suneo as Sha Wujing. The latter two reject Nobita when he announces his intention to play Sun Wukong as the role has already been given to Dekisugi. As the play commences, Nobita grows increasingly critical of Dekisugi's portrayal, staunchly claiming only someone who has met the real Monkey King would be able to portray him accurately. He is subsequently teased by Gian and Suneo who remind him that the character is fictional. Refusing to believe them, he runs home and, using Doraemon's Time Machine gadget, travels to a desert in 645AD China where he indeed, seemingly sees the real Sun Wukong fly past on his Nimbus Cloud. While calling out to him, Nobita sees a young boy collapse and, after giving him water, is shocked when the latter refers to him as Wukong while thanking him. Nevertheless, happy with the knowledge Sun Wukong is indeed real, Nobita returns home to invite his classmates, and together they travel to China once more. Whilst they do spot Tang Sanzang, Nobita is disappointed to see he has human companions and is once more ridiculed by Gian and Suneo. Desperate, Nobita has Doraemon help him impersonate Sun Wukong by setting up a virtual reality game titled Journey to the West which, as long as the system remains running, enables Nobita to appear as Sun Wukong and use his weapon, the Jingu Bang. The ruse is initially successful, with Gian, Suneo, and Shizuka believing they have met the real Monkey King. Unbeknownst to either Nobita or Doraemon, in their absence, all the demons from the game escape, and Nobita's disguise is later found out. When the friends try playing the game together, they find it empty with no enemies and return home, disappointed.

Later while having dinner with his family, Nobita sees his father's shadow take on a demonic appearance and runs in terror when a grotesque soup made from a lizard-like creature is prepared by his mother, who is nonplussed at his reaction. At school the next day, the building has taken on an eerie appearance, with a demonic statue replacing the main clock, and the plot of the school play changing with Dekisugi announcing that Tang Sanzang is to be eaten by the demons. When Nobita, Shizuka, Gian and Suneo oppose this, Dekisugi gets angry and a horn appears on his head. They are reprimanded by their teacher, who turns into a bull-like demon, causing the children to flee the school in terror. Upon reaching home, Nobita is scolded by his mother whereupon she grows horns and fangs. Horrified at what has happened to his family, Nobita and Doraemon survey the city and find a huge red pagoda having suddenly appeared. Nobita meets up with his friends, who all claim strange things have also happened to their families. Doraemon realizes that the demons from the game must have escaped when he used it the previous day, resulting not only in demons living in the real world, but also changing the course of time resulting in the modern world becoming ruled by them. The group vows to set things right by once more traveling back in time and returning the demons to the game.

Upon arriving back in 645AD, they don the appearances of the characters from Journey to the West and meet the real Tang Sanzang and his companion, Linley, revealed to be the same boy whom Nobita saved in the desert; however, while Linley believes he is Sun Wukong, he claims they had never met. The group manages to fend off two powerful demons, the Golden Horned King and Silver Horned King, who appear reluctant to harm Linley. Golden Horn is captured and returned to the game while Silver Horn escapes. The two groups part ways, with Nobita and co. crossing a desert on their way to locate Silver Horn. While Tang Sanzang continues on his pilgrimage, he is double-crossed by Linley, revealed to be secretly working with the demons, and is abducted whilst Linley flees. When Nobita goes to check on Tang Sanzang on the Nimbus Cloud, he happens to fly past his past self on the day he first traveled back to 645AD and first met Linley. He finds a massive castle resting atop a live volcano where he discovers the abducted Tang Sanzang. Back at the desert, Doraemon, Suneo and Gian are ambushed by Silver Horn but together, bring him down and return him to the game. In their fight, however, Shizuka is kidnapped. Nobita meanwhile, is confronted by the demoness of the castle, Princess Iron Fan whose Palm Leaf Fan blows him several miles away and he crashes into Linley. They soon reunite with Doraemon, Suneo and Gian, and are led to the castle. However, they fall down a trapdoor where they are captured and, along with Tang Sanzang and Shizuka, brought before the Bull Demon King and Princess Iron Fan, who reveal themselves to be the parents of Linley and whom they had sent to be their spy in a ploy to gain the trust of Tang Sanzang so that they could bring him to their castle to eat him. Though Nobita and his friends vow to punish Linley for his treachery, Tang Sanzang instead forgives him, revealing he had known the truth all along and believes the child is not truly evil; upon hearing this, Linley, who had been guilt-ridden since betraying him, begins to cry. As the Bull Demon King decides to devour all the humans by boiling them, Dorami comes to their rescue and Linley releases Nobita and his friends. Nobita battles and kills the Bull Demon King by piercing him through with the Jingu Bang. With his death, Princess Iron Fan loses her powers and she falls into the lava beneath, leaving her fan behind. The groups escape as the lava begins rising and the castle collapses. They use the Palm Leaf Fan to extinguish the volcano. Linley apologizes for his actions and promises to protect Tang Sanzang on his journey. The children bid them farewell and, with the demons vanquished and the timeline fixed, return to modern Japan.

== Cast ==
Character(s)	Japanese voice actor
Doraemon	Nobuyo Ōyama
Nobita Nobi/Sun Wukong	Noriko Ohara
Shizuka Minamoto/Tang Sanzang	Michiko Nomura
Takeshi "Gian" Gōda/Zhu Bajie	Kazuya Tatekabe
Suneo Honekawa/Sha Wujing	Kaneta Kimotsuki
Tamako Nobi	Sachiko Chijimatsu
Nobisuke Nobi	Masayuki Katō
Hidetoshi Dekisugi	Sumiko Shirakawa
Sensei	Ryōichi Tanaka
Dorami	Keiko Yokozawa
Time Machine	Yuji Mitsuya
Linley/Red Boy	Yuko Mizutani
Bull Demon King	Hidekatsu Shibata
Princess Iron Fan	Yōko Kuri
Golden Horn	Takko Ishimori
Silver Horn	Seizō Katō
Motohira-kun	Keiichi Nanba
Hero Machine Computer	Toshiro Ishii
Princess Peach	Eriko Hara
Tengu Bats	Yuu Shimaka; Aruno Tahara

== See also ==
- List of Doraemon films
