= Doraemon: Nobita and the Animal Planet =

1990 film by Tsutomu Shibayama

Doraemon the Movie: Nobita and the Animal Planet
- Theatrical release poster
- Directed by: Tsutomu Shibayama
- Screenplay by: Fujiko F. Fujio
- Based on: Doraemon's Long Tales: Noby's Storybook Planet by Fujiko F. Fujio
- Produced by: Sōichi Besshi
- Starring: Nobuyo Ōyama; Noriko Ohara; Michiko Nomura; Kaneta Kimotsuki; Kazuya Tatekabe; Mayumi Tanaka; Keaton Yamada; Run Sasaki; Kumiko Nishihara; Kiyoshi Kawakubo; Masashi Hirose; Atsuko Mine; Chafurin
- Music by: Shunsuke Kikuchi
- Production company: Shin-Ei Animation
- Distributed by: Toho
- Release date: 10 March 1990 (Japan)
- Running time: 100 minutes
- Country: Japan
- Language: Japanese
- Box office: $29.8 million

Doraemon: Nobita and the Animal Planet (ドラえもん のび太とアニマル惑星(プラネット), Doraemon Nobita to Animaru Puranetto) is a feature-length Doraemon film which premiered on March 10, 1990, in Japan, based on the tenth volume of the same name of the Doraemon Long Stories series. It is the 11th Doraemon film.

== Plot ==
Nobita stumbles upon a mysterious portal to a distant world inhabited by intelligent animals. When he and his friends travel there, they discover the planet is under threat from a secret organization called the Nimuge. Teaming up with a local boy named Chippo, the group helps lead a resistance. Doraemon's gadgets aid in defense, but it takes the arrival of interstellar police to bring justice. With the invaders arrested, peace is restored. Back on Earth, Nobita finds even his own world has taken a step toward protecting nature.

== Cast ==
Character	Japanese voice actor
Doraemon	Nobuyo Ōyama
Nobita Nobi	Noriko Ohara
Shizuka Minamoto	Michiko Nomura
Takeshi "Gian" Gōda	Kazuya Tatekabe
Suneo Honekawa	Kaneta Kimotsuki
Tamako Nobi	Sachiko Chijimatsu
Chippo	Mayumi Tanaka
Chippo's father	Keaton Yamada
Chippo's mother	Run Sasaki
Romi	Kumiko Nishihara
Utan	Kiyoshi Kawakubo
Goriro's father	Masashi Hirose
Goriro	Atsuko Mine
Pelican	Chafurin
White Goat	Eisuke Yoda
Pig Boy	Yōko Matsuoka
Doctor	Ryōichi Tanaka
Crow	Naoki Tatsuta
Horse	Masashi Sugawara
Spy	Masato Hirano
Police Commander	Masayuki Katō
Team Cockroach General	Katsuji Mori
Team Cockroach Boss	Jūrōta Kosugi
Team Cockroach Member	Toku Nishio
Citizens	Masako Matsubara; Naoki Bandō
Real State Agent	Takeshi Watabe
Company President	Osamu Katō

== See also ==
- List of Doraemon films
