= Sōichi Besshi =

Japanese anime producer (born 1941)

- 別紙 壮一
- Born: 1941 (age 84–85); Takamatsu, Kagawa Prefecture
- Occupation: Anime producer
- Years active: 1976–2009 (Shin-Ei Animation)
- Known for: Producer on Doraemon
- Children: Naoki Besshi (別紙 直樹) (son)

Sōichi Besshi (別紙 壮一, Besshi Souichi; born 1941) is a retired Japanese anime producer from Takamatsu, Kagawa Prefecture.

== Biography ==
Born in 1941 in Takamatsu, Kagawa Prefecture, Besshi graduated from Kagawa Prefectural Sakaide High School in 1956 and Chuo University's Faculty of Commerce in 1963.

He entered Nittsu Liquefied Gas Co., Ltd and remained with it as it was renamed to Nittsu Shoji Co., Ltd. (now currently known as NX Shoji Co., Ltd.), where he was placed in the company's accounting department.

At around the same time, he was asked by Yutaka Fujioka, a friend of his wife's older sister, to assist with accounting tasks, leading him to start visiting and working at A Production as a part-time employee. He would become sworn brothers with Fujioka.

Driven by a growing interest in the anime industry and at the request of Daikichirō Kusube, the president of A Production, Besshi decided to change his career path.

In November 1966, Besshi left Nippon Express Trading Co., Ltd. and joined A Production as a full-time staff member in general affairs and accounting. Initially, he was solely in charge of administrative duties, but as the order volume grew, he ended up also taking on production management responsibilities.

He participated in the founding of Shin-Ei Animation in 1976 and became its managing director. He served as the producer in charge on the Shin-Ei side for Ore wa Teppei, outsourced from Nippon Animation. After that, he worked on the anime adaptations of Fujiko Fujio manga such as The Monster Kid, Perman, and Doraemon.

Having witnessed the painstaking efforts of Sankichirou Kusube and his team in getting Doraemon re-adapted into an anime in 1979, he started paying special attention to the worldview and intentions of the manga's creator Fujiko F. Fujio. For this reason, he was actively against spin-offs such as The Doraemons in any capacity as a producer, as they were not created by Fujiko.

Besshi held a deep affection for Mami the Psychic, even preferring it to Doraemon. When adapting it into an anime, the initial proposal of TV Asahi's 6-minute daily slot was rejected, insisting that "it's not a work to be made in 6 minutes", and instead secured a 30-minute weekly slot. Keiichi Hara was appointed as chief director of the anime, with animator Noriyuki Tsutsumi as animation director. However, the pressure with his young age at the time on top of various complaints he received took a heavy toll on Hara, causing him to want to quit. Besshi ended up granting him a one-year leave of absence, where Hara spent nearly 8 months traveling throughout Southeast Asia and returned to work again after 10 months.

In 2009, Besshi departed from Shin-Ei Animation and retired. Since then, he has been active as a member of the Tokyo Setagaya Rotary Club as of 1994 and often gives lectures on Doraemon in various locations.

== Personal life ==
Besshi has a son named Naoki Besshi (別紙 直樹, Besshi Naoki), who worked at Shin-Ei Animation as a production manager and production desk for various Doraemon short films and Atashin'chi.

== Filmography ==
=== Television animation ===
- Ore wa Teppei (1977): Producer
- Ikkyū-san (1978): Producer
- Doraemon (1979–2005): Producer
- The Monster Kid (1980): Producer
- Doraemon: Europe Rail Travel (1983): Producer
- Mami the Psychic (1987): Producer
- The Laughing Salesman (1989): Producer
- 808 Ward Inside and Out: Make-Up Artist (1990): Producer
- 21 Emon (1991): Producer

=== Theatrical animation ===
- Doraemon: Nobita's Dinosaur (1980): Producer
- Doraemon: The Record of Nobita, Spaceblazer (1981): Producer
- The Monster Kid: Invitation to Monster Land (1981): Producer
- Doraemon: What Am I for Momotarō? (1981): Producer
- 21 Emon: Welcome to Space! (1981): Producer
- Doraemon: Nobita and the Haunts of Evil (1982): Producer
- The Monster Kid and The Demon's Sword (1982): Producer
- Doraemon: Nobita and the Castle of the Undersea Devil (1983): Producer
- Perman: Birdman Has Arrived!! (1983): Producer
- Doraemon: Nobita's Great Adventure into the Underworld (1984): Producer
- Doraemon: Nobita's Little Star Wars (1985): Producer
- Doraemon: Nobita and the Steel Troops (1986): Producer
- Doraemon: Nobita and the Knights on Dinosaurs (1987): Producer
- Doraemon: The Record of Nobita's Parallel Visit to the West (1988): Producer
- Mami the Psychic: Dancing Dolls in a Starry Sky (1988): Producer
- Doraemon: Nobita and the Birth of Japan (1989): Producer
- Dorami-chan: Mini-Dora SOS!!! (1989): Producer
- Doraemon: Nobita and the Animal Planet (1990): Producer
- Chinpui: Princess Eri's Activity Photo (1990): Producer
- Doraemon: Nobita's Dorabian Nights (1991): Producer
- Dorami-chan: Wow, The Kid Gang of Bandits! (1991): Producer
- Doraemon: Nobita and the Kingdom of Clouds (1992): Producer
- 21 Emon: Outer Space! Barefoot Princess (1992): Producer
- Doraemon: Nobita and the Tin Labyrinth (1993): Producer
- Dorami-chan: Hello, Dynosis Kids!! (1993): Producer
- Doraemon: Nobita's Three Visionary Swordsmen (1994): Producer
- Dorami-chan: A Blue Straw Hat (1994): Producer
- Plum Star Prince: Booming From the Edge of the Universe! (1994): Producer
- Doraemon: Nobita's Diary on the Creation of the World (1995): Producer
- 2112: The Birth of Doraemon (1995): Producer
- Doraemon: Nobita and the Galaxy Super-express (1996): Producer
- Dorami & Doraemons: Robot School's Seven Mysteries?! (1996): Producer
