= Teiji Ōmiya =

Japanese voice actor

- 大宮 悌二
- Born: November 22, 1928; Hachiōji, Tokyo Prefecture, Japan
- Died: December 23, 1994 (aged 66); Shinjuku, Tokyo, Japan
- Occupations: Actor; voice actor
- Years active: 1950–1994
- Agent: Tokyo Actor's Consumer's Cooperative Society

Teiji Ōmiya (大宮 悌二, Ōmiya Teiji; November 22, 1928 – December 23, 1994) was a Japanese actor, voice actor, and a member of the Tokyo Actor's Consumer's Cooperative Society when he died. He attended Nihon University, but withdrew before completing his degree. He was known for playing the roles of kind old men in many 1970s anime series. During his life, he achieved 3-dan in kendo.

Ōmiya died at the age of 66 of colorectal cancer on December 23, 1994.

== Roles ==
After his death, Ōmiya's role as an oni in Doraemon was assumed by Yasuhiro Takato.

=== Television dramas ===
These are live action works in which Ōmiya appeared.

- Yottsu no Me (四つの目) (1966–1972, NHK General TV science program)
- Renzu wa Saguru (レンズはさぐる) (1972–1978, NHK General TV science program)
- Mominoki wa Nokotta (樅ノ木は残った) (1970, NHK Taiga drama)
- Kaze to Kumo to Niji to (1976, NHK Taiga drama)
- Yami o Kire (闇を斬れ) (1981, NHK)
- Tokugawa Ieyasu (1983, NHK Taiga drama)
- Hana no Ran (1994, NHK Taiga drama)

=== Tokusatsu ===
- Android Kikaider (Green Mantis (ep. 2), Blues Kong (ep. 7), Scorpion Brown (ep. 10), Pink Tiger (ep. 13), Sponge Green (ep. 27 - 29), Dorippe frascone Red (ep. 33), Anglerfish Brown (ep. 39))
- Kikaider 01 (Red Hakaider (eps. 1 - 9), Red Centipede (ep. 5 and 6), Red Face Turtle (ep. 9 - 11), Shadow Golem (ep. 16), Giant Devil (ep. 18), Vampire Bat No.18 (ep. 21))
- Inazuman Flash (Guillotine Desper (ep. 19 and 20))
- Himitsu Sentai Goranger (Steel Mask (ep. 35), Camera Mask (ep. 48), Faucet Mask (ep. 56))
- J.A.K.Q. Dengekitai (Devil Cane (ep. 10))
- Battle Fever J (Umbrella Monster (ep. 1), Fang Lion Monster (ep. 3), Egg Monster (ep. 13), Galaxy Monster (ep. 14), Blue Vein Monster (ep. 17), Magnet Monster (ep. 18), Worm Monster (ep. 32), Eagle Monster (ep. 33), Bomb Monster (ep. 36), Four Faced Monster (ep. 37))
- Denshi Sentai Denjiman (Jukular (ep. 13), Panchiroller (ep. 14), Rosokaler (ep. 21), Mimiler (ep. 31), Beedamaler (ep. 34), Kendamaler (ep. 48))
- Taiyou Sentai Sun Vulcan (Grub Worm Monger (ep. 1), Bird Monger (ep. 4), Black Sun God (ep. 5), Devil Monger (ep. 5), Machine Monger (ep. 6))
- Dai Sentai Goggle-V (Porcupine Mozoo (ep. 36))
- Space Sheriff Gavan (Double Bad Man, Goat Monster)
- Kagaku Sentai Dynaman (Diving beetle Shinka (ep. 14))
- Space Sheriff Sharivan (Dori Beast, Fang Beast)
- Kamen Rider Black Movie (Chameleon Mutant)
- Kamen Rider Black RX (King Stone)

=== Anime television series ===
- Astro Boy (1963–1966, Principal, Smuggler Boss, Fat Sailor, others)
- Mach GoGoGo (1967–1968, Daisuke Mifune)
- Sabu to Ichi Torimono Hikae (1968–1969, Ichi)
- Star of the Giants (1968–1971, Masaichi Kaneda)
- Hakushon Daimaō (1969–1970, soldier)
- Tomorrow's Joe (1970–1971, Ōtaka-kaichō)
- Inakappe Taishō (1970–1972, Jitto Mitōru)
- Animentarī Ketsudan (1971, Sugiyama)
- Astro Gunger (1972–1973, Hayakawa-jichō)
- Devilman (1972–1973, Baū)
- Science Ninja Team Gatchaman (1972–1974, Secretary Anderson)
- Demetan Croaker, The Boy Frog (1973, Chūji)
- Vicky the Viking (1974–1975, the King)
- A Dog of Flanders (1975, Danton)
- Time Bokan (1975–1976, Benkei, Oyakata, Kenpu)
- Paul no Miracle Taisakusen (1976–1977, Doa Majin)
- Rascal Racoon (1977, Fred North)
- Ippatsu Kanta-kun (1977–1978, Oshō, Daijirō)
- Yakyū-kyō no Uta: Kita no Ōkami, Minami no Tora (1977, Hiura Matsurigoto)
- Gatchaman II (1978–1979, Secretary Anderson)
- Invincible Steel Man Daitarn 3 (1978–1979, Carlos)
- Tondemo Nezumi Daikatsuyaku (1979-06-30, Būrakān)
- Time Patrol Corps: Otasukeman (1980–1981, Saigō Takamori)
- Belle and Sebastian (1981–1982, Albert)
- Wan Wan Sanjūshi (1981–1982, D'Artagnan's father)
- Manga Nihonshi (1983–1984, Katsu Kaishū)
- Dancouga - Super Beast Machine God (1985, Principal)
- Konchū Monogatari: Minashigo Hutch (1989–1990, Yotōga, Chichi Mushi)
- Nadia: The Secret of Blue Water (1989–1990, Captain Mable)
- Marude Dameo (1991–1992, Yukio)

=== OVAs ===
- Tezuka Osamu Animation World (1983–1987)
- Bubblegum Crisis: Born to Kill (1987, Commander Swarz)
- Legend of the Galactic Heroes (1988–1997, Grand Bishop (seasons 1-3))
- The Green Cat (1983, Taichō)
- Dancouga - Super Beast Machine God: Requiem for Victims (1986, Principal)
- The Cockpit (1993, Captain)

=== Anime films ===
- Science Ninja Team Gatchaman: The Movie (1978, Secretary Anderson)
- Yakyūkyō no Uta: Kita no Ōkami, Minami no Tora (1979, Hiura Matsurigoto)
- What Am I for Momotaro (1981, Oni)
- Doraemon: Nobita's Monstrous Underwater Castle (1983, Chancellor Mū)
- Lupin III: Legend of the Gold of Babylon (1985, ICPO Director)
- Doraemon: Nobita at the Birth of Japan (1989, Mammoth)
- The Story of Perrine (1990)
- Roujin Z (1991, Chief Minagawa)
- Nadia: The Secret of Blue Water (1992, Captain Mable)
- Raian Tsūrī no Uta (1994, Zenzō)

=== Dubbing ===
==== Live-action ====
- Dracula: Prince of Darkness, Father Sandor (Andrew Keir)
- The Good, the Bad and the Ugly, Corporal Wallace (Mario Brega)
- Harlem Nights, Bugsy Calhoune (Michael Lerner)
- Wyatt Earp, Nicholas Porter Earp (Gene Hackman)

==== Animation ====
- Robin Hood, Robin Hood
