= Doraemon: Nobita's Great Adventure into the Underworld =

1984 film by Tsutomu Shibayama

Doraemon the Movie: Nobita's Great Adventure into the Underworld
- Theatrical release poster
- Kanji: ドラえもん: のび太の魔界大冒険
- Revised Hepburn: Doraemon: Nobita no Makai Daibōken
- Directed by: Tsutomu Shibayama
- Screenplay by: Fujiko Fujio
- Based on: Doraemon's Long Stories: Nobita's Great Adventure into the Underworld by Fujiko Fujio
- Produced by: Sōichi Besshi
- Starring: Nobuyo Ōyama; Noriko Ohara; Michiko Nomura; Kaneta Kimotsuki; Kazuya Tatekabe; Tadashi Nakamura; Mami Koyama; Keiko Yokozawa
- Cinematography: Akihiko Takahashi
- Edited by: Kazuo Inoue
- Production company: Shin-Ei Animation
- Distributed by: Toho
- Release date: 17 March 1984
- Running time: 97 minutes
- Country: Japan
- Language: Japanese
- Box office: $25.7 million

Doraemon: Nobita's Great Adventure into the Underworld (ドラえもん: のび太の魔界大冒険, Doraemon: Nobita no Makai Daibōken), also known as Doraemon, Nobita and the Underworld Adventure, is a 1984 Japanese animated science fantasy film which premiered on March 17, 1984, in Japan, based on the fifth volume of the same name of the Doraemon Long Stories series. The fifth in the series, it was the first to incorporate computer graphics technology. The film was watched by more than 3 million people and generated a revenue of 1.65 billion yen. It was the highest-grossing animated film of the year 1984. By its release, Doraemon became the first and the only franchise to have 2 back-to-back highest-grossing animated films of the year. A remake of this film was released in Japan on March 10, 2007, entitled Doraemon: Nobita's New Great Adventure into the Underworld.

== Plot ==
The film opens with Nobita having a magic-themed dream but is interrupted once his mother tells him to wake up. Following that, when he and Doraemon take out the trash, Nobita finds a stone statue that looks exactly like Doraemon, and takes it home, confusing them both as well. Doraemon gets curious but thinks Nobita is crazy for thinking it was caused by magic, Nobita tries to do some research about it with Dekisugi but he tells Nobita it was eventually disproven by science. Later, Nobita finds another stone statue, this one looks like him. He and Doraemon wonder if the statues are actually themselves from another time or world, so they decide to leave it alone. However, at midnight during a storm, the statues manage to enter the house, and appears in a different pose.

Nobita requests Doraemon to give him the What-If Box and wishes for the world to become a place where the use of magic is normal. Magic replaces science and technology and everyone makes use of it on their daily lives. However, since neither Nobita nor Doraemon can use them, they find it much harder to do than they imagine. This causes Nobita to do poorly in school where magic was taught. Back home, Doraemon encourages Nobita to learn magic, but when Shizuka arrives, he is only able to lift her skirt using said magic, when suddenly an earthquake happened. According to Shizuka, frequent earthquakes are related to a hypothesis of a doctor of magic, Professor Mangetsu (満月先生), that "the demon world is approaching". Wanting to meet this professor to learn more about this world, Nobita, Doraemon, and Shizuka went to search for him using a flying broom, while Doraemon uses a Bamboo copter, something that's considered entirely foreign in this world.

They search the hill behind the school, where they spot Suneo and Gian bullying a monkey, which turns out to be a demon, burning their brooms and causing them to fall. The group helps them to get into a house, which turns out to be Professor Mangetsu house, who helps them with his assistant, a girl named Miyoko. Professor Mangetsu also tells the group about his research, where he suspects that the demons are currently planning to invade the Earth, and if nothing is done, humankind will go extinct, with the huge earthquakes and typhoons occurring as the precursors. Realizing how dangerous this is, Nobita and Doraemon planned to return the world to normal, but found out that the What-If Box was thrown away by Nobita's mother. Worse, the news reveals that the prophecy comes true. After discussing that night, Nobita and Doraemon decides they must do something.

In the middle of the night, a cat wakes both Nobita and Doraemon. When the moon briefly shines onto the cat, it transforms into Miyoko. She reveals that she and Professor Mangetsu were attacked by demons last night, and she was cursed into a cat, with the spell disappearing only when she's under the moonlight. She then begs both of them to save the world from the devil in the demon world, much to their surprise, but then Miyoko uses a crystal ball to reveal the 'five heroes who will defeat the demon king', they see the five main characters.

The next day, the typhoon that forms near Japan gets worse and school is suspended. This convinces Nobita and Doraemon to join Miyoko, the two go through the typhoon and finds her near where Magnetsu's house once stood, hiding from a demon and the monkey from earlier. Using the Translation Cake, Doraemon and Nobita understand Miyoko even when she's a cat, who explains that she can draw a barrier that makes them unable to be found by demons. However, when Shizuka is spotted by the demon, the group fights to safe her. Miyoko fares well at first, until the monkey disarms her. Doraemon uses the Reverse Cloak to deflect the demon's spell back, destroying it and the monkey. After the fight, Gian and Suneo also join the group deciding it would be better to fight then stay at home.

Miyoko grabs a book that contains information of the devil's world, while Doraemon puts on a wizard hat with a star pattern as they use a flying carpet to reach the devil's world from space. After experiencing more oddities of the magic world like being able to breathe in space, the carpet having a lower floor room, and seeing rabbits on the moon, the group then fly through the world's South Pole, but they had to abandon the flying carpet with the Bamboo copter as it got burned.

They have to traverse the South Pole, a sea housing mermaids who lure them into a monster's stomach, a plains that moves itself and a forest filled with even more monsters but break through. Using Doraemon's Pebble Hat, the group encounters the Devil himself. Miyoko tells everyone to throw the darts at its heart to defeat it, but to their surprise, it didn't work. Overpowered by the devil and his demons, Miyoko gives Nobita the scroll containing the information of the devil's world but all except Nobita and Doraemon get captured. Though initially depressed, Doraemon got an idea of using the Time Machine to stop their past selves from entering this world in the first place. However, the devil finds out where they are, and sends Medusa to stop them. Despite Nobita being able to fly with the broom, both of them eventually got petrified into stone statues, which their past selves find in the beginning of the story.

However, they're saved by the sudden appearance of Dorami, who detects the danger with one of her gadgets. She gives Nobita a What-If box to restore the world to normal, with a fake end screen playing but they realize that Miyoko and their friends are still captured, and it will stay that way because of the parallel universe. When they use the time machine to return to the devil's world, Nobita takes out the scroll that Miyoko gave her, and realizes that the Devil's heart is not in his body, but it turns out to be a star in outer space. They managed to rescue the others along with Professor Mangetsu before the demons cook them, and avoid capture because a demon mistook the stars on Doraemon's hat as a symbol of high rank. They restoring the Magic Carpet with the Time Cloth, and make their way back to space to find the Devil's heart and destroy it.

During their search, they're chased by the devil and his army of demons. They turn stars into fireballs that attack the group, but with Miyoko's curse lifted, she's able to send them away with a spell. When more stars attacking them, Professor Mangetsu steers the carpets to dodge them, and even with everyone using Doraemon and Dorami's weapon gadgets, they barely manage to hang on. Finally, they managed to spot the Devil's heart, where Gian throws a dart at it, both the heart and the devil himself are set aflame, and the demon world is destroyed.

The film ends with Nobita and Miyoko bidding farewell before Nobita returns to his original world and him lifting Shizuka's skirt wondering if he can do magic still, but dismisses it thinking wind caused it.

== Cast ==
Character	Japanese voice actor
Doraemon	Nobuyo Ōyama
Nobita Nobi	Noriko Ohara
Takeshi "Gian" Gōda	Kazuya Tatekabe
Shizuka Minamoto	Michiko Nomura
Suneo Honekawa	Kaneta Kimotsuki
Nobisuke Nobi	Masayuki Katō
Tamako Nobi	Sachiko Chijimatsu
Professor Mangetsu	Tadashi Nakamura
Miyoko	Mami Koyama
Dorami	Keiko Yokozawa
Hidetoshi Dekisugi	Sumiko Shirakawa
Sensei	Ryōichi Tanaka
Mrs. Gōda	Kazuyo Aoki
Jiji	Airul Nafizi
The Devil	Genzō Wakayama
Demon Captain	Tatsuyuki Jinnai
Demons	Osamu Katō; Tesshō Genda; Keaton Yamada; Masashi Hirose
Errand Demon	Shigeru Chiba
Demaon the Evil King	Toshiya Ueda
Children; Mermaids	Chiyoko Kawashima; Satomi Majima

== Music ==
- Kaze No Magikaru (風のマジカル) sung by Kyōko Koizumi.

== See also ==
- List of Doraemon films
