= Doraemon: Nobita and the Kingdom of Clouds =

1992 film by Tsutomu Shibayama

Doraemon the Movie: Nobita and the Kingdom of Clouds
- Theatrical release poster
- Directed by: Tsutomu Shibayama
- Written by: Fujiko F. Fujio
- Based on: Doraemon's Long Tales: Noby's Kingdom in the Clouds by Fujiko F. Fujio
- Produced by: Sōichi Besshi
- Starring: Nobuyo Ōyama; Noriko Ohara; Michiko Nomura; Kaneta Kimotsuki; Kazuya Tatekabe
- Cinematography: Hideko Takahashi
- Edited by: Kazuo Inoue; Yuko Watase
- Music by: Shunsuke Kikuchi
- Production companies: Asatsu; Shin-Ei Animation
- Distributed by: Toho
- Release date: March 7, 1992 (Japan)
- Running time: 98 minutes
- Country: Japan
- Language: Japanese
- Box office: $26.2 million

Doraemon: Nobita and the Kingdom of Clouds (ドラえもん のび太と雲の王国, Doraemon Nobita to Kumo no Ōkoku), also known as Doraemon and the Kingdom of Clouds, is a feature-length Doraemon film that premiered on March 7, 1992, in Japan based on the 12th volume of the same name of the Doraemon Long Stories series. It is the 13th Doraemon film.

== Plot ==
The film opens with a spaceship warning an old man to leave the island he is staying on with his son and grandson. During the night, a flood sinks the majority of the island. Later that day, Nobita asks his teacher if Heaven exists in clouds, getting mocked by both his teacher and classmates. After attempting to run from home, Doraemon solidifies a cloud to build a kingdom of clouds with the help of robots. They later on invite Gian, Suneo and Shizuka to invest for building the castle. With most shares from Suneo, they build the kingdom with various facilities of their interests. The friends enjoy their respective dreams every day at the Heaven. Doraemon also gives Nobita a crown that makes everyone in their cloud obey him, and a Flying Shawl.

Meanwhile, various areas of Earth covered in nature are reported to have been stolen by a cloud. In Africa, a group of illegal poachers also get lifted due to said clouds. As the news reaches Nobita, the city cloud hits a mountain. Doraemon and Nobita check and find the boy, seen in the beginning who is unconscious while riding a turtle-like creature. They cure his fever and put him to rest. Before going home, Doraemon adds a Time Handle on the Anywhere Door, allowing it to function like the Time Machine. That night, Doraemon researches about animal they encountered earlier, and realizes it is a Glyptodon which had gone extinct 11,000 years earlier. The next day, the group learns that the boy disappeared. When they're looking for their cloud kingdom, they wind up arriving at a mysterious land inside a cloud.

They meet Paruparu, a sky-human who explains that they are in the Kingdom of Clouds, a kingdom in the sky is inhabited by humans who resorted to live in the sky. Nobita and his friends are stay in a hotel, when they are about to go to bed, Nobita presses a button where they see a mass of clouds heading somewhere which is interrupted by Gurio who tells them they are not supposed to see it. They then escape realizing they were locked inside for an unknown reason while escaping they get separated due to a thunderstorm. A lightning bolt hits and internally damages Doraemon. Gian, Suneo and Shizuka are recaptured by the sky humans while Nobita, his Flying Shawl ruined, looks for Doraemon and learns that he is malfunctioning.

The captive friends explore the kingdom with Paruparu, learning its history, and that the kingdom would carry out Plan Noah to destroy human cities and everything that's polluting Earth. Meanwhile, Nobita and Doraemon meet their lilliputian friend Hoi whom they once helped. The island boy is revealed to be named Tagaro who tells that the control center can determine location of a person wearing the special ring. Because Nobita doesn't wear it, Hoi helps transport Nobita and Doraemon using a giant bird. Seemingly through luck, they ended up in their own heaven cloud, but when they use the Anywhere Door, the Earth is hit by an extreme flood. During the chaos, Doraemon gets fixed when his head hits a pole and saves Nobita, realizing the flood had destroyed the entire city. When they return to the cloud, they realize the Time Handle was set to the future when Nobita's mother had turned it and when they return to the day the came from see the world is still normal.

While held in the sky kingdom, Gian, Shizuka, Suneo and the poachers picked up from earlier stand trial for the environmental damage the human race had caused to Earth, during their time standing trial, many animals speak about how people had impacted their lives while the humans standing trial attempt to defend themselves to no avail, but it stops mid-trial when Paruparu tells the court to give them more time. During this time, thinking of how to prevent the flood, Doraemon reveals a cannon that can destroy any cloud, although he has no intention of using it, instead just using it as a bluff and leverage against the sky human.

Meanwhile, the group of illegal poachers escapes and crash land on Nobita's cloud, who then reveal the earlier flooding was caused by Plan Noah. Although Doraemon and Nobita help them, the poachers then took them captive by stealing Nobita's crown when they realize how much money they could make and started firing the cannon. Failing to help them, the captive friends and Paruparu are thrown into jail where they meet Nobita and Doraemon. Feeling responsible for revealing the cannon, Doraemon destroys the gas tank using his head, which destroys the cloud. Doraemon is gravely injured, while Paruparu addresses the court during a final trial. Nobita is supported by many of their friends whom he helped. Finally, a now-adult Kibo whom Nobita once helped revives Doraemon. With increased favor, the sky humans decide to abandon Noah's plan. Then Nobita and his friends are transported back to the Earth after bidding farewell to the sky humans. When they land, Shizuka reminds the friends of their homework due to which Nobita, Gian, Shizuka and Suneo scream panic cries and sunny day with closing credits his the end credits era all new return to the exact time they had left earlier during the end credits his around the world.

== Cast ==
| Character | Japanese voice actor |
|---|---|
| Doraemon | Nobuyo Ōyama |
| Nobita Nobi | Noriko Ohara |
| Shizuka Minamoto | Michiko Nomura |
| Takeshi "Gian" Gōda | Kazuya Tatekabe |
| Suneo Honekawa | Kaneta Kimotsuki |
| Tamako Nobi | Sachiko Chijimatsu |
| Nobisuke Nobi | Masayuki Katō |
| Sensei | Ryōichi Tanaka |
| Paruparu | Miki Itō |
| Gulio | Akira Murayama |
| President | Yusaku Yara |
| Tagao | Urara Takano |
| Hoi | Yoshiko Matsuo |
| Hoi's father | Takumi Yamazaki |
| Hoi's mother | Kei Hayami |
| Kibo | Eiji Maruyama |
| Representatives | Kazuhiko Kishino; Yuzuru Fujimoto |
| Police | Nobuo Tobita |
| TV Announcer | Satomi Kōrogi |
| Cinema Usherette | Rie Iwatsubo |
| Poachers | Kiyoshi Kobayashi; Yuu Shimaka; Takumi Yamazaki |

== See also ==
- List of Doraemon films
