= Doraemon: Nobita and the Birth of Japan =

1989 film by Tsutomu Shibayama

Doraemon the Movie: Nobita and the Birth of Japan
- Japanese theatrical release poster
- Directed by: Tsutomu Shibayama
- Screenplay by: Fujiko F. Fujio
- Based on: Doraemon by Fujiko F. Fujio
- Produced by: Sōichi Besshi
- Starring: Nobuyo Ōyama; Noriko Ohara; Michiko Nomura; Kaneta Kimotsuki; Kazuya Tatekabe
- Music by: Shunsuke Kikuchi
- Production company: Shin-Ei Animation
- Distributed by: Toho
- Release date: 11 March 1989
- Running time: 100 minutes
- Country: Japan
- Language: Japanese
- Box office: $31.4 million

Doraemon: Nobita and the Birth of Japan (ドラえもん のび太の日本誕生, Doraemon: Nobita no Nippon Tanjō) is a feature-length Doraemon film which premiered in Japan on 11 March 1989, based on the ninth volume of the same name of the Doraemon Long Stories series. This was the tenth Doraemon film, commemorating the 10th anniversary of the film series. In 2016, a remake of the movie was released, titled Doraemon: Nobita and the Birth of Japan 2016.

== Plot ==
The movie starts with a boy in prehistoric time hunting a fish, who returns to his village in ruins and is immediately sucked into a time vortex and ends up traveling to the 20th century. In the 20th century, Nobita wants to run away from home and decides to make a makeshift place to live, but he still cannot find a place to live due to land property ownership laws. At the same time, Suneo, Gian, Shizuka and Doraemon all also want to run away from home as well. Nobita suggests that they should all go back in time to live in a place with no humans residing in Japan. The group agree with him and they travel back in time to prehistoric Japan around 70,000 years in the past.

When they reach Japan, Doraemon assigns everyone a ministry. Shizuka is given the Ministry of Gardening, Gian gets the Ministry of Development, Suneo receives the Ministry of Agriculture and Nobita receives the Ministry of Pets, with Doraemon overseeing all ministries. Nobita mixes the genes of different animals and creates a dragon, griffin and pegasus. When Doraemon arrives to check in on his progress, Nobita hides the creatures from him.

At night, the group eat supper and decide to return home and visit there again another day. The next day, the boy from the start of the movie secretly sneaks into Nobita's room and hides inside the closet. When Gian and Suneo arrive, the boy attacks Gian and fights with him. Due to weakness, the boy ends up fainting. Upon Nobita, Shizuka and Doraemon arriving, the group again travel back to the past. They take the boy into their cave and he regains consciousness after Shizuka nurses him back to health. Meanwhile, Doraemon searches with a signal through time and learns that the boy hails from somewhere in present-day China, which has been already inhabited by humans by this era. Doraemon uses a translation tool in order to understand him. The boy tells them that he belongs to the light tribe and that his tribe got attacked by a dark tribe who have taken all of his people, with the group deciding to help.

They trace the dark tribe on Pegasus, Dragon and Griffin for four days. On the fourth day, they find and fight them. However, their dogū proves to be strong and possess magical powers, giving them a strong challenge until they are defeated by Doraemon's gadgets. The dogū restores itself after Doraemon, his friends and the tribe leave. The group take the whole tribe to Japan to give them a peaceful place to live. Once night strikes, they return home.

The next day Doraemon tells everybody that the dogū can restore itself and the light tribe is still in danger, so they go back in time again. Once they arrive, they discover their village had already been destroyed by the dark tribe. The group traces the dark tribe using Doraemon's human train gadget, but Nobita ends up getting lost and is separated from the group during a harsh snowstorm.

Without Nobita, the rest of the group continue to move and find the light tribe. Doraemon fights with Gigazombie, the king of spirits. Doraemon reveals him to be a 23rd century time criminal who aims to create his own world by destroying the time passage, so that no one can find him. He easily defeats Doraemon and the others since he has more updated gadgets than Doraemon.

On the other hand, Nobita finds a box near him and sees a mammoth that tells him if he needs help he should press the button. Nobita's pet animals Pegasus, Dragon and Griffin return and rescue Nobita's friends. However Gigazombie shuts them to a lone place. Nobita uses the button and the helper is the Time Patrol, who arrest Gigazombie. Pegasus, Dragon and Griffin are taken back with them to the future as they are fictitious creatures in the current era and the group bids a sad farewell as they depart.

== Cast ==
An English version produced and released exclusively in Malaysia by Speedy Video features an unknown voice cast.

Character	Japanese voice actor
Doraemon	Nobuyo Ōyama
Nobita Nobi	Noriko Ohara
Shizuka Minamoto	Michiko Nomura
Takeshi "Gian" Gōda	Kazuya Tatekabe
Suneo Honekawa	Kaneta Kimotsuki
Kukuru	Yōko Matsuoka
Kuzakaru	Ryūji Nakagi
Tarane	Sakiko Tamagawa
Elder	Kōichi Kitamura
Utabe	Issei Futamata
Hikari Tribe villagers	Chafurin; Naoki Bandō; Kiyoyuki Yanada
Gigazombie	Ichirō Nagai
Mammoth	Teiji Ōmiya
Tsuchidama	Gara Takashima
Kurayami tribe villagers	Masashi Hirose; Kazuhiko Kishino; Daisuke Gōri
Time Machine	Yūji Mitsuya
Landlord	Takashi Taguchi
Future Time Patrol	Kōichi Hashimoto
Boy	Mari Mashiba
Girls	Tamao Hayashi; Masae Asaka
Tamako Nobi	Sachiko Chijimatsu
Nobisuke Nobi	Masayuki Katō
Sensei	Ryōichi Tanaka
Mrs. Gōda	Kazuyo Aoki

== See also ==
- List of Doraemon films
