= Tadashi Nakamura (voice actor) =

Japanese voice actor (1929–2019)

- 中村 正
- Born: December 24, 1929; Aichi Prefecture, Empire of Japan
- Died: November 11, 2019 (aged 89); Kanagawa Prefecture, Japan
- Occupations: Actor; voice actor; narrator
- Years active: 1952—2018
- Agent: Tokyo Actor's Consumer's Cooperative Society
- Known for: Oshiete! 3 Shimai as the narrator (2010-2012)

Tadashi Nakamura (中村 正, Nakamura Tadashi; December 24, 1929 – November 11, 2019) was a Japanese actor, voice actor and narrator. He was attached to the Tokyo Actor's Consumer's Cooperative Society.

Nakamura died from blood poisoning resulting of inflammation of the gallbladder at the age 89 at 9:10 A.M on November 11, 2019.

== Filmography ==
=== Television animation ===
- Osomatsu-kun (1966) (Mogura)
- Star of the Giants (1968) (Tetsuharu Kawakami)
- Marine Boy (1969) (Faamu)
- Lupin III Part III (1984) (Aran Bonparuto (ep. 2))
- Animated Classics of Japanese Literature: Botchan (1986) (Redshirt)
- Ironfist Chinmi (1988) (Narrator)
- Like the Clouds, Like the Wind (1990) (Narrator)
- Magical Princess Minky Momo (1991) (Narrator)
- Lupin III: The Pursuit of Harimao's Treasure (1995) (Lord Arthur)
- Bubblegum Crisis Tokyo 2040 (1998) (Quincy Rosenkreutz)
- Oh My Goddess! (1998) (Narrator)
- Reign: The Conqueror (1999) (Parmenion)
- Tetsujin 28-go (2004) (Dr. Bigfire)
- Shimajirō Hesoka (2010-2012) (Oshiete! 3 Shimai) (Narrator)
- Space Brothers (2012) (Ozzy Smith)
- Life Counselling TV Animation "Jinsei" (2014) (Narrator)

=== OVA ===
- Legend of the Galactic Heroes (1989) (Franz von Mariendorf)
- Giant Robo (1992) (Shokatsuryo Komei)

=== Theatrical animation ===
- Doraemon: Nobita's Great Adventure into the Underworld (1984) (Dr. Mangetsu)
- Grave of the Fireflies (1988) (Police officer)
- The Girl Who Leapt Through Time (2006) (Old Security Guard)
- Summer Wars (2009) (Mansaku Jinnouchi)
- Doraemon: Nobita and the New Steel Troops—Winged Angels (2011) (Professor)
- Wolf Children (2012) (Hosokawa)
- The Boy and the Beast (2015)
- Mirai (2018) (Bullet train)

=== Dubbing roles ===
==== Live-action ====
- Leslie Nielsen
  - Counterpoint (1976 Fuji TV edition) (Victor Rice)
  - The Poseidon Adventure (1976 TBS edition) (Captain Harrison)
  - Airplane! (1983 TBS edition) (Dr. Rumack)
  - The Creature Wasn't Nice (Captain Jamieson)
  - The Naked Gun: From the Files of Police Squad! (Lt. Frank Drebin)
  - Repossessed (Father Jebedaiah Mayii)
  - The Naked Gun 2½: The Smell of Fear (Lt. Frank Drebin)
  - Surf Ninjas (Colonel Chi)
  - Naked Gun 33 1/3: The Final Insult (Lt. Frank Drebin)
  - S.P.Q.R.: 2,000 and a Half Years Ago (Lucio Cinico)
  - Dracula: Dead and Loving It (Count Dracula)
  - Wrongfully Accused (Ryan Harrison)
  - Kevin of the North (Clive Thornton)
  - Slap Shot 3: The Junior League (Mayor of Charlestown)
- David Niven
  - Around the World in 80 Days (Phileas Fogg)
  - Separate Tables (Major David Angus Pollock)
  - The Guns of Navarone (1972 TV Asahi and 1982 Fuji TV editions) (Cpl. John Anthony Miller)
  - 55 Days at Peking (Sir Arthur Robertson)
  - The Pink Panther (1973 TV Asahi and 1976 NTV editions) (Sir Charles Lytton)
  - Bedtime Story (Lawrence Jamison)
  - Lady L (Lord Lendale)
  - Where the Spies Are (Doctor Jason Love)
  - Casino Royale (1976 TV Asahi edition) (Sir James Bond 007)
  - Murder by Death (1981 TBS edition) (Dick Charleston)
  - Candleshoe (Priory)
  - Death on the Nile (Colonel Johnny Race)
  - Escape to Athena (1982 TBS edition) (Professor Blake)
  - Curse of the Pink Panther (Sir Charles Lytton)
- Rex Harrison
  - My Fair Lady (Professor Henry Higgins)
  - The Yellow Rolls-Royce (Charles)
  - Doctor Dolittle (Doctor John Dolittle)
  - The Honey Pot (Cecil Sheridan Fox)
  - Crossed Swords (The Duke of Norfolk)
- Bing Crosby
  - Going My Way (Father Chuck O'Malley)
  - The Bells of St. Mary's (Father Chuck O'Malley)
  - White Christmas (Bob Wallace)
  - High Time (Harvey Howard)
  - The Road to Hong Kong (Harry Turner)
- 12 Angry Men (1969 TV Asahi edition) (Juror #5 (Jack Klugman))
- Aces: Iron Eagle III (Palmer (Christopher Cazenove))
- Armageddon (2002 Fuji TV edition) (The President (Stanley Anderson))
- Batman Begins (2007 NTV edition) (Alfred Pennyworth (Michael Caine))
- Bewitched (Narrator)
- Bewitched (2005) (Nigel Bigelow (Michael Caine))
- Captain Corelli's Mandolin (Dr. Iannis (John Hurt))
- Charlie's Angels (Charles "Charlie" Townsend)
- Charlie's Angels (film) (Charles "Charlie" Townsend)
- Charlie's Angels: Full Throttle (Charles "Charlie" Townsend)
- The Chronicles of Narnia: The Lion, the Witch and the Wardrobe (Professor Digory Kirke (Jim Broadbent))
- The Cider House Rules (Dr. Wilbur Larch (Michael Caine))
- Cutthroat Island (Ainslee (Patrick Malahide))
- Dr. Strangelove (1971 TV Asahi edition) (President Merkin Muffley (Peter Sellers))
- Dog Day Afternoon (1979 Fuji TV edition) (FBI Agent Sheldon (James Broderick))
- Heartbreakers (William B. Tensy (Gene Hackman))
- Hot Shots! (RADM Thomas "Tug" Benson (Lloyd Bridges))
- Hot Shots! Part Deux (President Thomas "Tug" Benson (Lloyd Bridges))
- How to Steal a Million (Simon Dermott (Peter O'Toole))
- L.A. Confidential (2001 Fuji TV edition) (Capt. Dudley Smith (James Cromwell))
- Lawrence of Arabia (2000 TV Tokyo edition) (Turkish Bey (José Ferrer))
- The Matrix Reloaded (2006 Fuji TV edition) (The Architect (Helmut Bakaitis))
- The Matrix Revolutions (2007 Fuji TV edition) (The Architect (Helmut Bakaitis))
- Night at the Museum (Cecil "C.J." Fredericks (Dick Van Dyke))
- Night at the Museum: Secret of the Tomb (Cecil "C.J." Fredericks (Dick Van Dyke))
- Raiders of the Lost Ark (1993 DVD edition) (Marcus Brody (Denholm Elliott))
- RoboCop (1990 TV Asahi edition) (Dick Jones (Ronny Cox))
- The Rock (James Womack (John Spencer))
- Rush Hour 3 (Varden Reynard (Max von Sydow))
- Total Recall (1992 TV Asahi edition) (Vilos Cohaagen (Ronny Cox)))
- The Towering Inferno (1979 Fuji TV, 1984 NTV and 1989 TBS editions) (Harlee Claiborne (Fred Astaire))
- Unforgiven (English Bob (Richard Harris))
- Xanadu (Danny McGuire (Gene Kelly))

==== Animation ====
- House of Mouse (Narrator)
- One Hundred and One Dalmatians (Old Towser)

== Awards ==
Year	Award	Category	Result
2016	10th Seiyu Awards	Merit Awards	Won
