= Masako Sugaya =

Japanese voice actress (1937–2021)

- 菅谷政子
- Born: August 21, 1937; Tokyo, Japan
- Died: February 25, 2021 (aged 83)
- Occupation: Voice actress
- Agent: Arts Vision

Masako Sugaya (菅谷政子, Sugaya Masako) (August 21, 1937 – February 25, 2021) was a Japanese voice actress who worked primarily in anime.

She died on February 25, 2021.

== Filmography ==
=== Anime ===
==== Television ====
- Perman (1967), Ganko
- Under Sea Boy Marine (1969), Kurikuri
- Umeboshi Denka (1969), Umeboshi-Queen
- Attack No. 1 (1969), Yoshiko Katori
- Kashi no Ki Mokku (1972)
- Kerokko Demetan (1973)
- Dog of Flanders (1975), Paul
- Laura, a Little Girl on the Prairie (1975), Mary
- Nobody's Boy: Remi (1977), Remi
- Lupin III: Part II (1977), Romanofu (ep 146)
- Bannertail: The Story of Gray Squirrel (1979), Clea
- Adventures of Tom Sawyer (1980)
- Astro Boy (1980), Uran
- Ohayo! Spank (1981), Futaba
- Meiken Jolie (1981)
- Ninja Hattori-kun (1981), Kenichi Mitsuba
- Superbook (1981), Tottori Ryo
- Urusei Yatsura (1981), Little Tanuki (O-shima) (ep 52)
- Chikkun Takkun (1984), Tick Duck
- Ranma ½ (1989), Yukinko (ep 124)
- Sorcerer Hunters (1995), Lake (ep 4)

==== Films ====
- Space Boy Soran (1965), Chappy
- Hokkyoku no Muushika Miishika (1979), Muushika
- Ie Naki Ko (1980), Reni
- Doraemon: Nobita no Uchū Kaitakushi (1981), Roppuru
- Bremen 4: Angels in Hell (1981), Trio
- Nausicaä of the Valley of the Wind (1984), Girl A
- Urusei Yatsura: Remember My Love (1985), Oshima the Tanuki

==== Original video animations ====
- Aim for the Ace! Final Stage (1988), Maki Aikawa
- Aim for the Ace! 2 (1988), Maki Aikawa

=== Dubbing ===
==== Live-action films ====
- Child's Play 2 - Andy Barclay (Alex Vincent)
- Dragonworld - Miss Twittingham (Janet Henfrey)
- Eaten Alive - Angie (Kyle Richards)
- The Goonies - Richard "Data" Wang (Ke Huy Quan) (1988 TBS dub)
- The Omen - Damien Thorn (Harvey Spencer Stephens) (Laserdisc edition)

==== Live-action television ====
- The Man from U.N.C.L.E. - #4
