= Doraemon: The Records of Nobita, Spaceblazer =

1981 film by Hideo Nishimaki

Doraemon the Movie: The Records of Nobita, Spaceblazer
- Theatrical release poster
- Kanji: ドラえもん: のび太の宇宙開拓史
- Revised Hepburn: Doraemon: Nobita no Uchū Kaitakushi
- Directed by: Hideo Nishimaki
- Screenplay by: Fujiko Fujio
- Based on: Doraemon's Long Tales: Noby the Spaceblazer by Fujiko Fujio
- Produced by: Sōichi Besshi; Tetsuo Kanno
- Starring: Nobuyo Ōyama; Noriko Ohara; Michiko Nomura; Kaneta Kimotsuki; Kazuya Tatekabe; Masako Sugaya; Mami Koyama; Kazuko Sugiyama; Emiko Tsukada
- Cinematography: Akira Koike; Akihiko Takahashi
- Edited by: Kazuo Inoue; Seiji Morita
- Music by: Shunsuke Kikuchi
- Production company: Shin-Ei Animation
- Distributed by: Toho
- Release date: 14 March 1981
- Running time: 90 minutes
- Country: Japan
- Language: Japanese
- Box office: $27.3 million

Doraemon: The Records of Nobita, Spaceblazer (ドラえもん のび太の宇宙開拓史, Doraemon Nobita no Uchū Kaitakushi; lit. 'Doraemon: Nobita's History of Cosmic Reclamation') is a 1981 Japanese animated science fiction neo-western film based on the second volume of the same name of the Doraemon Long Stories series. The film was released in the theatres of Japan on 14 March 1981. It is the 2nd Doraemon film. In 2009, the film was remade as Doraemon: The New Record of Nobita's Spaceblazer. It is based on the 1979 chapter "The Amazing Nobitaman" and the 1980 chapter "Wild Wild Nobita".

== Plot ==
The film opens with a scene that parodies the original Star Wars movie where Chammy and Ropporu are being chased by the mining corporation and engage in a warp sequence before Nobita is awoken by Doraemon telling him that Gian wants to find him. Gian and Suneo get him to convince them to get the empty lot from a group of middle school baseball players, but they chase him and knock him out. Both Gian and Suneo gets livid at him, and Nobita runs into Shizuka's house to save himself.

However, all three of them managed to make Nobita to beg Doraemon to find them an empty lot. While Nobita is sleeping, he suddenly feels the floor trembling like an earthquake. Chammy forces the passage between them open using a hammer. Nobita is thrown out of bed and both him and Doraemon hear sounds from the fridge. Chammy is caught by both of them and she shows them the passageway through Nobita's floor into the spaceship. After they enter the spaceship, they befriend both Chammy and Ropporu, fix the spaceship and leave.

The very next day, Nobita and Doraemon go through said passage again wanting to visit them again but get stranded. The following day, they meet the rest of Ropporu's family. Nobita then brings the rest of his friends along but then get attacked by mining agents who wanted to get resources from the planet. His friends then subsequently flee back to their dimension.

The day after that, Nobita is scolded by his mother for hiding his test paper, Nobita and Doraemon then decide to meet Ropporu once more. On the next visit, they end up on the metropolitan planet due to Ropporu having to buy thing. After that, they get shot at by mining agents. However, Nobita and Doraemon fight with them with ease due to the difference in the gravities of between both worlds.

They quickly defeated them and ran back. Ropporu tells all of the town's people about Doraemon and Nobita, but Bubu gets jealous when Clem, Ropporu's sister praises Nobita. Every time the miners try to tease people, Doraemon and Nobita save them. Soon Borgant learns of Doraemon and Nobita and calls for Guillermin to help, Borgant then devises a plan to get rid of them. Bubu who spies on Clem, Chammy, Doraemon and Nobita gets captured by mining agents, Borgant then holds him at gun point, to tell him where the secret passage, which Nobita and Doraemon come from, is located. Bubu tells them and the agents plant a bomb on the entrance.

The mining group warn the people of Koya Koya to leave the planet as they had brought in a device to destroy the planet. Ropporu then heads for the mountain himself, while Chammy attempts to contact Nobita and Doraemon but the bomb gets set off and the ship is destroyed. On the other side, Nobita's mother ordered him to study hard and calls Shizuka to keep an eye on him.

Nobita tells her the whole story, suddenly, the entrance opens, Chammy gets out of it and tells all of them that Koya Koya is in trouble. Nobita and Doraemon go through again, noting that the passage between them is starting to collapse, Shizuka then goes to call Gian and Suneo to come help. Doraemon and Nobita, with the help of Chammy enter the mountain. There they attempt to stop the corporation's plans themselves and save Ropporu from near death.

Guillermin attempts to kill Nobita's group but is immobilized by Ropporu's shock gun. Nobita's friends who are guided by Bubu then arrive and help them take down the mining corporation's ship, forcing Borgant to flee but not before telling them that the device would explode. Chammy, Doraemon and Nobita attempt to stop the destruction device manually but Ropporu uses the Time Cloth on it which stops the device from destroying Koya Koya. Borgant and the corporation's head are then arrested while the rest of the mining corporation searched for its attempt to blow up the planet.

The main cast then bids farewell to the movie characters while the entrance shuts off permanently. In the ending sequence, Doraemon and Nobita wonder if Chammy, Clem and Ropporu are thinking of them with them also doing the same with Doraemon and Nobita.

== Cast ==
Character	Japanese voice actor
Doraemon	Nobuyo Ōyama
Nobita Nobi	Noriko Ohara
Shizuka Minamoto	Michiko Nomura
Suneo Honekawa	Kaneta Kimotsuki
Takeshi "Gian" Gōda	Kazuya Tatekabe
Tamako Nobi	Sachiko Chijimatsu
Nobisuke Nobi	Masayuki Katō
Ropporu	Masako Sugaya
Clem	Mami Koyama
Chammy	Kazuko Sugiyama
Ropporu's mother	Emiko Tsukada
Camoran	Tadao Futami
Bubu	Eiko Yamada
Boganto	Kenji Utsumi
Mesu	Koichi Kitamura
Guillermin	Hidekatsu Shibata
Baseball Captain	Masahiro Sakuramoto
Middle school students	Naoki Tatsuta; Kazunari Futamata

== Release ==
Doraemon: The Records of Nobita, Spaceblazer was released theatrically in Japan on 14 March 1981, where it was distributed by Toho.

== See also ==
- List of Doraemon films

== Bibliography ==
- Galbraith IV, Stuart (1996). The Japanese Filmography: 1900 through 1994. McFarland. ISBN 0786400323.
- Galbraith IV, Stuart (2008). The Toho Studios Story: A History and Complete Filmography. Scarecrow Press. ISBN 9781461673743.
