= Atsuko Mine =

Japanese actress and narrator (born 1951)

- 峰 あつ子
- Born: Atsuko Tanaka (田中 篤子) (née Komine (小峰)); May 2, 1951 (age 75); Tokyo, Japan
- Occupations: Actress; voice actress; narrator
- Years active: 1970–present
- Employer: Production Baobab
- Website: Official profile

Atsuko Mine (峰 あつ子, Mine Atsuko; born May 2, 1951) is a Japanese actress, voice actress, and narrator from Tokyo affiliated with the talent management firm Production Baobab.

== Biography ==
Mine was born in Tokyo, Japan on May 2, 1951.

She graduated from the Tokyo Metropolitan Jindai High School.

She then graduated from the Susukida Acting Institute and the Tokyo Announcement College. She studied under Kenji Usuida and Toshio Hayano before forming Group Eight. After the group disbanded, she joined Production Baobab.

== Personal life ==
Her vocal range is husky alto and she speaks in the Hiroshima dialect.

Her special skill is performing Japanese dance while her personal hobbies include reading, watching movies, visiting art museums, traveling, and gardening.

As a voice actress, she is primarily active in anime and dubbing.

== Filmography ==
=== Television animation ===
- Aesop World (Moguran, Usagi)
- Aquarian Age: Sign for Evolution (Reporter)
- Atashin'chi (Yukarin's Grandmother)
- Misha the Black Bear (Mrs. Taiga)
- Detective Conan (Kotoya Ryokan Proprietor, Matsuko)
- Cooking Papa (Kokku-san, Mrs. Higashiyama, Hatsue, Child, Others)
- Crayon Shin-chan (Warugaki, Young Lady, Old lady)
- Doraemon (Nobita's Grandmother (First voice))
- Fate/Zero (Martha Mackenzie)
- Fushigi Yûgi (Amiboshi's mother)
- Game Center Arashi (Garae Ishino)
- GetBackers (Ban Mido)
- Gyakuten Ippatsuman (Granny)
- Haikara-san ga Tōru (Countess Ijūin (Shinobu's mother))
- Ijiwaru Baa-san (Hana)
- Ippatsu Kanta-kun (Opponent Team Member B, Boy B, Michiko)
- Jankenman (Umeboshi Grandma)
- Kaibutsu-kun (Gameru)
- Kaiketsu Zorro no Densetsu (Maria)
- Karakuri Kiden Hiwō Senki (Fuku)
- Konjiki no Gash Bell!! (Riri)
- Kiko-chan's Smile (Kindergarten Principal, Nursing Mother)
- Magical Star Magical Emi (Haruko Nakamori)
- Maison Ikkoku (Ikuko Otonashi's mother)
- Mashin Eiyūden Wataru (Old Witch)
- Metal Fighter Miku (Masayo Harajuku)
- Mikan Enikki (Okiyo)
- Mister Ajikko (Otomi)
- Nintama Rantarō (Kyūsaku Nose (First voice))
- Ōgon Yūsha Goldoran (Old Woman, Mama)
- Oku-sama wa Mahō Shōjo: Bewitched Agnes (Maiko Motohira)
- Paul no Miracle Taisakusen (Jim)
- Pro Golfer Saru (Daimaru Sarutani)
- Samurai 7 (Setsu)
- Speed Grapher (Mrs. Morishita)
- Time Bokan (Akazukin, Merry)
- Tokimeki Tonight (Rara)
- Touch (Kikue)
- Turn A Gundam (Head Nurse)
- Uchūsen Sagittarius (Nara)
- Urusei Yatsura (Mother)
- Windy Tales (Old Lady)
- Yatterman (Nightingirl, Okappa, Nobleman's Wife, Customer A, Cleopatra)
- YAWARA! a fashionable judo girl! (Yuki Tōdō)
- Zenderman (Zushiō)

=== Theatrical animation ===
List of voice performances in theatrical animation
Year	Title	Role	Notes	Source
1981	Kaibutsu-kun: Invitation to Monster Land	Pet		
1982	Gauche the Cellist	Orchestra Member		
1982	Kaibutsu-kun: The Demon Sword	Pet Monster		
1986	Pro Golfer Saru: Challenge to Super Golf World!!	Daimaru		
1987	Pro Golfer Saru: Kouga Secret Valley! The Shadow Ninja Golfer Arrives!	Daimaru		
1990	Doraemon: Nobita and the Animal Planet	Gorirō		
1991	Mobile Suit Gundam F91	Mrs. Elm		
1994	Pom Poko	Matriarch		
1995	Memories	Female		
1999	You're Under Arrest: The Movie	Additional voice		
2005	xxxHolic - A Midsummer Night's Dream	Additional voice		
2009	Doraemon: The New Record of Nobita's Spaceblazer	Bubu		
2010	King of Thorn	Additional voice		

=== Original video animation (OVA) ===
List of voice performances in original video animation
Year	Title	Role	Notes	Source
1985	Fire Tripper	Shūhei's mother		
1986	Maris the Chojo	Maris' mother		
1986	Mahō no Star Magical Emi Semishigure	Haruko Nakamori		
1993	Mermaid's Scar	Haruyo		
1993	Hello Kitty's Alice in Wonderland	Queen		
1999	Shishunki Bishōjo Gattai Robo Z-Mind	Koto Hanakawado		

=== Dubbing ===
==== Feature films ====
List of dubbing performances in overseas films
Title	Role	Notes	Source
Blue Steel	Shirley Turner (Louise Fletcher)	1993 Fuji TV edition	

==== Animation ====
List of dubbing performances in overseas animation
Title	Role	Notes	Source
Legend of the Guardians: The Owls of Ga'Hoole	Mrs. Plithiver (Miriam Margolyes)		
Road Rovers	Colleen (Tress MacNeille)		
SWAT Kats: The Radical Squadron	Deputy Mayor Calico Marie "Callie" Briggs (Tress MacNeille)		
