= Doraemon: Nobita's Dinosaur =

1980 film by Hiroshi Fukutomi

Doraemon the Movie: Nobita's Dinosaur
- Theatrical release poster

Japanese name
- Kanji: ドラえもん: のび太の恐竜
Transcriptions
- Revised Hepburn: Doraemon: Nobita no Kyōryū
- Directed by: Hiroshi Fukutomi
- Screenplay by: Fujiko Fujio; Seiji Matsuoka
- Based on: Doraemon's Long Tales: Noby's Dinosaur by Fujiko Fujio
- Produced by: Sankichiro Kusube; Sōichi Besshi
- Starring: Nobuyo Ōyama; Noriko Ohara; Michiko Nomura; Kaneta Kimotsuki; Kazuya Tatekabe; Keiko Yokozawa; Masayuki Katō
- Cinematography: Katsuji Misawa
- Edited by: Kazuo Inoue; Seiji Morita
- Music by: Shunsuke Kikuchi
- Production company: Shin-Ei Animation
- Distributed by: Toho
- Release date: March 15, 1980
- Running time: 100 minutes
- Country: Japan
- Language: Japanese
- Box office: $25 million

Doraemon: Nobita's Dinosaur (ドラえもん: のび太の恐竜, Doraemon: Nobita no Kyōryū) is a 1980 Japanese animated science fiction adventure film based on the manga series Doraemon, particularly the first volume of the same name of the Doraemon Long Stories series, which itself was based on a single chapter of the original manga. The film premiered on March 15, 1980, in Japan. It is the first feature-length Doraemon film. In 2006, the film received a remake called Doraemon: Nobita's Dinosaur 2006 as the first feature-length film for the 2005 reboot. It is an expanded version of the 1975 chapter of the same name. It became the highest-grossing animated film of 1980.

== Plot ==
Suneo shows a fossil of a dinosaur claw to everyone except Nobita. Being very furious, Nobita claims he will be able to find a living dinosaur. Due to Doraemon refusing to help him, he digs on a hillside, but instead earns punishment from a landlord nearby who forces him to unearth a hole in the ground. He finds an egg-shaped stone underneath and quickly uses a time wrap to return it to its former form, and after warming it, the egg hatches to reveal a Futabasaurus, who is subsequently named Piisuke by Nobita. Instead of immediately showing the Futabasaurus to the others, Nobita waits for it to grow while making a deal with others. However, as Piisuke grows too large, Nobita and Doraemon hide him in the nearby lake but attract the attention of a mysterious assailant from the 24th century who wanted to purchase Piisuke from Nobita. Worried about the risk of Piisuke being found and overwhelmed in having to take care of the dinosaur, Doraemon and Nobita transport him to 100 million years ago in the Late Cretaceous period. They are attacked by an assailant who previously tried to make a deal with Nobita to sell Piisuke, though they manage to escape. When Gian and Suneo confront Nobita about his claim about his living dinosaur, he runs into Shizuka, but after revealing that even she thinks he's lying, Nobita got furious and brings all three of them to his house to show Piisuke. Left with no proof, Nobita instead shows them Piisuke through a television monitor, but realizes that he and Doraemon had unknowingly transported Piisuke to the North American shore after the time machine was attacked by the assailant. They and the others decide to go there, but the time machine is overloaded and gets destroyed once they arrive.

The group lands on the North American shore and finds Piisuke, proving Nobita's claim and making his friends apologize to him. Doraemon suggests the others have fun on the beach, while he quietly tries to fix the time machine. He only reveals that the time machine is broken and must be taken back to Nobita's desk in faraway Japan if they want to go back to the present time after he failed. At night, when they are having dinner, a large Tyrannosaurus appears from the forest. Doraemon uses his Momotaro Dango to control it, and orders him to go back. The group decides to travel across Beringia to return home. In their way, they meet with various dinosaur species who either help or hinder their progress, such as Brontosaurus and Ornithomimus. At a cliff, they are attacked by a pack of Pteranodons, who break their bamboocopters. They are saved by several assailants, who reveal they are dinosaur hunters working for a fossil collector named Dollmanstein from the 24th century. They offer to return them back home in exchange for selling Piisuke. Refusing the deal, the group set a lure for the hunters by making mud statues of them and placing them in cars, while they escape across a river with a raft. However, they are eventually spotted and separated, with Gian, Suneo, and Shizuka captured by the hunters, while Nobita, Doraemon and Piisuke fell from a waterfall.

Thankfully, one of Doraemon's gadgets saved the three. Leaving Piisuke behind for its safety, Doraemon and Nobita find the hunters' quarter downstream where Gian, Suneo, and Shizuka are used as baits for a Tyrannosaurus. The hunters demand that they hand over Piisuke in exchange for their lives, but the Tyrannosaurus is revealed to be the one they had previously used a Momotaro Dango for, and the group uses it to attack the hunters. The hunters are subsequently captured and imprisoned by the Time Patrol. Piisuke is transported to his homeland, Late Cretaceous Japan, while Nobita and his friends bid him farewell and go back to the present day.

== Cast ==
Character	Japanese voice actor
Doraemon	Nobuyo Ōyama
Nobita Nobi	Noriko Ohara
Shizuka Minamoto	Michiko Nomura
Takeshi "Gian" Gōda	Kazuya Tatekabe
Suneo Honekawa	Kaneta Kimotsuki
Tamako Nobi	Sachiko Chijimatsu
Nobisuke Nobi	Masayuki Katō
Mrs. Gōda	Kazuyo Aoki
Piisuke	Keiko Yokozawa
Mr. Gakeshita	Masayuki Katō
Black Mask	Seizō Katō
Mrs. Honekawa	Yoshino Ohtori
Time Patrol Squad	Masayuki Katō; Kazuhiko Inoue; Yoshito Miyamura
Dolmanstein	Ushio Shima

== Release ==
Doraemon: Nobita's Dinosaur was released in Japan on March 15, 1980, where it was distributed by Toho. The film grossed ¥2.64 billion in Japan and was the fifth highest-grossing Japanese film of the year, and one of the highest-grossing animated films.

== Home media ==
The film was first released on Laserdisc in Japan on October 18, 1989.

The film was released on VHS by Shogakukan in December 1991. It was later re-released on VHS by Pony Canyon on May 17, 1996. Pony Canyon eventually released the film on DVD on March 14, 2001. The company later re-released the film on DVD on September 3, 2010.

== See also ==
- List of films featuring dinosaurs
- List of Doraemon films

== Bibliography ==
- Galbraith IV, Stuart (2008). The Toho Studios Story: A History and Complete Filmography. Scarecrow Press. ISBN 9781461673743.
