= Toshiya Ueda =

Japanese voice actor (1933–2022)

- 上田 敏也
- Born: February 24, 1933; Sapporo, Hokkaido, Japan
- Died: February 8, 2022 (aged 88)
- Occupation: Voice actor
- Years active: 1950s–2022
- Agent: 81 Produce

Toshiya Ueda (上田 敏也, Ueda Toshiya; February 24, 1933 – February 8, 2022) was a Japanese voice actor who worked for 81 Produce. He died on February 8, 2022, at the age of 88.

== Filmography ==
=== Television animation ===
- Jungle Emperor (1965) (Lion A)
- Sabu to Ichi Torimono Hikae (1968) (Rihei)
- Andersen Stories (1971) (Ole the Dream-god)
- Science Ninja Team Gatchaman (1972) (Old man)
- The Adventures of Pepero (1975) (Titicaca)
- 3000 Leagues in Search of Mother (1976) (Lombardini)
- Rascal the Raccoon (1977) (Futon)
- Lupin III Part 2 (1977) (Commissioner, Part 2 Episode 155)
- The Story of Perrine (1978) (Onu)
- Mobile Suit Zeta Gundam (1985) (Melanie Hue Carbine)
- Princess Sarah (1985) (Monsieur Dufarge)
- Parasol Henbē (1989) (Principal)
- Pretty Soldier Sailor Moon (1992) (Kunitachi)
- Bonobono (1995) (Ōsanshōuo-san and Kaeru-kun)
- Pokémon (1998) (Katsura)
- Ojarumaru (1998) (Tomio Tamura)
- Mirmo! (2003) (Enma-sensei)
- One Piece (2011) (Nefertari Cobra)

=== Original video animation (OVA) ===
- Legend of the Galactic Heroes (1994) (Otto Wehler)
- The Silent Service (1995) (Nicholas J. Bennett)
- Burn-Up W (1996) (Professor M)

=== Theatrical animation ===
- Doraemon: Nobita's Great Adventure into the Underworld (1984) (Medusa)
- Mobile Suit Zeta Gundam: A New Translation II - Lovers (2005) (Melanie Hue Carbine)
- Mobile Suit Zeta Gundam: A New Translation III - Love is the Pulse of the Stars (2006) (Melanie Hue Carbine)

=== Video games ===
- Kingdom Hearts II (2005) (Owl)

=== Dubbing roles ===
==== Live-action ====
- Back to the Future (1989 TV Asahi edition) (Lou (Norman Alden))
- Battle of Britain (Baron von Richter (Curd Jürgens))
- The Big Brawl (Kwan (Chao-Li Chi))
- The China Syndrome (1985 NTV edition) (Evan McCormack (Richard Herd))
- Christopher Robin (Owl)
- Damien: Omen II (1981 TBS edition) (Bill Atherton (Lew Ayres))
- Dead Poets Society (Headmaster Gale Nolan (Norman Lloyd))
- Dirty Harry (1978 TV Asahi edition) (Sid Kleinman (Maurice Argent))
- Dune (Gurney Halleck (Patrick Stewart))
- Emperor of the North Pole (Cracker (Charles Tyner))
- Existenz (Gas (Willem Dafoe))
- Fire Down Below (2000 TV Asahi edition) (Cotton Harry (Harry Dean Stanton))
- The Great Escape (1971 Fuji TV edition) (Flt. Lt. MacDonald (Gordon Jackson))
- The Horse Soldiers (1983 TBS edition) (Col. Phil Secord (Willis Bouchey))
- Lorenzo's Oil (Doctor Judalon (Gerry Bamman))
- The Mask (1996 NTV edition) (Dr. Arthur Neuman (Ben Stein))
- Nell (Dr. Alexander "Al" Paley (Richard Libertini))
- The NeverEnding Story (Engywook (Sydney Bromley))
- Night on Earth (Helmut Grokenberger (Armin Mueller-Stahl))
- Nineteen Eighty-Four (Emmanuel Goldstein (John Boswall))
- North (Judge Buckle (Alan Arkin))
- The Peacemaker (Colonel Dimitri Vertikoff (Armin Mueller-Stahl))
- The Pirate Movie (Major-General Stanley (Bill Kerr))
- Schindler's List (Itzhak Stern (Ben Kingsley))
- Seven (1998 Fuji TV edition) (Mark Swarr (Richard Schiff))
- She-Wolf of London (Angus (Charles Lewsen))
- The Sting (Eddie Niles (John Heffernan))
- Striking Distance (Captain Vince Hardy (John Mahoney))
- Two Much (Sheldon Dodge (Eli Wallach))
- Wall Street (1992 TV Asahi edition) (Cromwell (Richard Dysart))
- Warlords of Atlantis (1981 TV Asahi edition) (Jacko (Derry Power))
- The Wild Geese (Sergeant Jock McTaggart (Ronald Fraser))

==== Animation ====
- Biker Mice from Mars (Dr. Benjamin Boris Zachary Karbunkle)
- Mune: Guardian of the Moon (Yule)
- Winnie-the-Pooh series (Owl)

==== Tokusatsu ====
- Choushinsei Flashman (1986) - Hero Titan (2 episodes)
  - Choushinsei Flashman: Big Rally! Titan Boy! (1986) - Hero Titan
- Hikari Sentai Maskman (1988) - Water Mirror (ep. 50)
- Gekisou Sentai Carranger (1996) - OO Oopa (ep. 18)
