= Star of the Giants =

Japanese manga series

- Cover of the first volume of Star of the Giants, as published in Japan by Kodansha

巨人の星 (Kyojin no Hoshi)
- Genre: Sports
- Manga
- Written by: Ikki Kajiwara
- Illustrated by: Noboru Kawasaki
- Published by: Kodansha
- Magazine: Weekly Shōnen Magazine
- Original run: May 1966 – January 1971
- Volumes: 19
- Anime television series
- Directed by: Tadao Nagahama
- Studio: Tokyo Movie
- Original network: YTV
- Original run: March 30, 1968 – September 18, 1971
- Episodes: 182
- Anime film

Kyojin no Hoshi: Chizome no Kesshōusen
- Studio: Tokyo Movie
- Released: July 26, 1969
- Runtime: 90 minutes
- Anime film

Kyojin no Hoshi: Ike Ike Hyūma
- Studio: Tokyo Movie
- Released: December 20, 1969
- Runtime: 70 minutes
- Anime film

Kyojin no Hoshi: Dai League Ball
- Studio: Tokyo Movie
- Released: March 21, 1970
- Runtime: 70 minutes
- Anime film

Kyojin no Hoshi: Shukumei no Taiketsu
- Studio: Tokyo Movie
- Released: August 1, 1970
- Runtime: 60 minutes
- Anime television series

Shin Kyojin no Hoshi
- Studio: Tokyo Movie Shinsha
- Original network: NNS (YTV)
- Original run: October 1, 1977 – September 30, 1978
- Episodes: 52
- Anime television series

Shin Kyojin no Hoshi II
- Studio: Tokyo Movie Shinsha
- Original network: NNS (YTV)
- Original run: April 14, 1979 – September 29, 1979
- Episodes: 23
- Anime film
- Directed by: Satoshi Dezaki; Tadao Nagahama
- Studio: Tokyo Movie Shinsha
- Released: August 21, 1982
- Runtime: 110 minutes

Star of the Giants (Japanese: 巨人の星, Hepburn: Kyojin no Hoshi) is a Japanese sports manga series written by Ikki Kajiwara and illustrated by Noboru Kawasaki. It was serialized in Kodansha's Weekly Shōnen Magazine from 1966 to 1971. It is about the actual baseball team Yomiuri Giants using fictional characters. It was launched by the "Yomiuri Group" which at the time owned not only the actual baseball team, but the TV network Nippon Television, the newspaper Yomiuri Shimbun, as well as Yomiuri Telecasting Corporation. It was adapted into an anime television series broadcast in Japan in 1968. It later spawned two anime sequels and different anime films. In total there were 262 episodes.

== Story ==
The story is about Hyūma Hoshi, a promising young baseball pitcher who dreams of becoming a top star like his father Ittetsu Hoshi in the professional Japanese league. Ittetsu was once a 3rd baseman until he was injured in World War II and was forced to retire; now an impoverished and bitter widower, he's raised Hyūma and his older sister Akiko in a very severe environment. The boy would join the ever popular Giants team, and soon he realized the difficulty of managing the high expectations. From the grueling training to battling the rival Mitsuru Hanagata in the Hanshin Tigers, Hyūma would have to take out his best pitching magic to step up to the challenge.

== Characters ==
- Hyūma Hoshi: Tōru Furuya
- Ittetsu Hoshi: Seizō Katō
- Akiko Hoshi: Fuyumi Shiraishi
- Ban Chūta: Jōji Yanami
- Mitsuru Hanagata: Makio Inoue
- Kawakami Tetsuharu: Tadashi Nakamura
- Masaichi Kaneda: Teiji Ōmiya
- Kyōko: Reiko Mutō
- Hosaku Samon: Shingo Kanemoto
- Mina Hadaka: Yoshiko Matsuo

== Media ==
=== Anime ===
Beginning in 2001, the series was re-released on DVD format. In June 2013, a five set Blu-ray release was released.

=== Films ===
The first Star of the Giants movie debuted on July 26, 1969, as part of the vacation anime festival on large screen theatres in color. The draw was that most people had black and white TVs at the time. The Star of the Giants vs. Mighty Atom TV special reached the United States and was renamed to Astro Boy vs. the Giants.

Japanese name	English name	Release date	Type	Run time
	Star of the Giants vs. Mighty Atom	June 9, 1969	TV special	30 mins
巨人の星	Star of Giants: The Movie	July 26, 1969	Film	90 mins
巨人の星 行け行け飛雄馬	Star of Giants: Ike Ike Hyuma	December 20, 1969	Film	75 mins
巨人の星 大リーグボール	Star of Giants: Big League Ball	March 21, 1970	Film	70 mins
巨人の星 宿命の対決	Star of Giants: Shukumei no Taiketsu	August 1, 1970	Film	60 mins
新巨人の星	New Star of Giants	October 1, 1977	TV series	52 episodes
新巨人の星	New Star of Giants: The Movie	December 1, 1977	Film	
新巨人の星II	New Star of Giants II	April 14, 1979	TV series	23 episodes
	Stars of Giants Special Edition: Fierce Tiger Mitsuru Hanagata	October 23, 2002	OVA	13 episodes

=== Video games ===
Kyojin no Hoshi (The Anime Super Remix) was released for the PlayStation 2 by Capcom on June 20, 2002. There were also a number of other games on the same platform.

== Reception and legacy ==
On TV Asahi's Manga Sōsenkyo 2021 poll, in which 150,000 people voted for their top 100 manga series, Star of the Giants ranked 38th.

The anime series ranked fifteenth on TV Asahi's Top 100 Anime 2005 poll.

Professional baseball player Ichiro Suzuki used Star of Giants as a reference to his grueling childhood baseball training. The anime was remade in India in 2012 as Suraj: The Rising Star where cricket was substituted for baseball. Episode 18 of Kyatto Ninden Teyandee (dubbed and released in North America as Samurai Pizza Cats) includes a pitcher named Puma Pochi, voiced by Tōru Furuya, as a direct parody of Hyūma Hoshi. In English, the character is renamed Fernando Curtainzuela.
