= 21 Emon =

Japanese manga series

- First tankōbon volume cover (Mushi Comics edition)

21エモン (Nijūichi Emon)
- Genre: Adventure; Science fiction comedy
- Manga
- Written by: Fujiko F. Fujio (Note: Credited as Fujiko Fujio during serialization.)
- Published by: Shogakukan; Mushi Pro Shōji (Note: 1971–72 edition); Chuokoron-Shinsha (Note: 1984 edition)
- Imprint: Mushi Comics; Tentōmushi Comics (Note: First Shogakukan collected edition (1977–78)); Fujiko Fujio Land
- Magazine: Weekly Shōnen Sunday
- Original run: January 1, 1968 – February 2, 1969
- Volumes: 3; 4; 5
Further information
Anime film
21 Emon: Uchū e Irasshai!
| Directed by | Tsutomu Shibayama |
| Produced by | Sōichi Besshi; Tetsuo Kanno |
| Written by | Masaki Tsuji |
| Music by | Shunsuke Kikuchi |
| Studio | Shin-Ei Animation |
| Released | August 1, 1981 |
| Runtime | 92 minutes |
Anime television series
| Directed by | Keiichi Hara (chief) |
| Produced by | Junichi Kimura (TV Asahi); Yasuo Kameyama (Asatsu); Seiko Kokansha (Asatsu); Sōichi Besshi; Tetsuo Kanno |
| Music by | Kohei Tanaka |
| Studio | Shin-Ei Animation |
| Original network | ANN (TV Asahi) |
| Original run | May 2, 1991 – March 26, 1992 |
| Episodes | 39 |
Anime film
21 Emon: Soraike! Hadashi no Princess
| Directed by | Mitsuru Hongo |
| Produced by | Sōichi Besshi; Hitoshi Mogi; Junichi Kimura |
| Written by | Akira Okeya |
| Music by | Kohei Tanaka |
| Studio | Shin-Ei Animation |
| Released | March 7, 1992 |
| Runtime | 40 minutes |
- icon

21 Emon (Japanese: 21エモン, Hepburn: Nijūichi Emon), also known as 21 Emon: The 21st Century Kid, is a Japanese manga series written and illustrated by Fujiko F. Fujio. It was serialized in Shogakukan's shōnen manga magazine Weekly Shōnen Sunday from 1968 to 1969. An anime film adaptation, animated by Shin-Ei Animation premiered in 1981. A 39-episode anime television series was broadcast on TV Asahi from May 1991 to March 1992. A second anime film premiered in March 1992. Set in a futuristic world, the series follows a boy named 21 Emon, heir to a long dynasty of hotel owners, whose ancestor goes back to the Edo Period.

== Plot ==
Having to struggle with keeping up their family hotel business at 21 Emon is trying his hardest to help out his family as the new heir, although his dream is not being in the hotel business his whole life but exploring the space as a space pilot.

== Media ==
=== Manga ===
Written and illustrated by Fujiko F. Fujio, 21 Emon was serialized in Shogakukan's shōnen manga magazine Weekly Shōnen Sunday from the January 1, 1968, to the February 2, 1969, issues; additional stories were also published in special issues of Shōnen Sunday (March, August, and October 1968 issues) and CoroCoro Comic (August 1981 issue); a spin-off, titled Monger-chan (モンガーちゃん, Mongā-chan), was published in Shogakukan no Yochien (July to September 1968 issues). Three collected tankōbon volumes were released by Mushi Pro Shōji, under the Mushi Comics imprint, from October 30, 1971, to January 30, 1972. Shogakukan released the series in four volumes, under their Tentōmushi Comics imprint, from August 25, 1977, to April 25, 1978. A five-volume edition was released by Chuokoron-Shinsha, under the Fujiko Fujio Land imprint, from June to October 1984. A three-volume bunkoban edition was released by Shogakukan on April 25, 1997. A two-volume edition was released by Shogakukan as part of their "Fujiko F. Fujio Complete Works" collection on August 25 and December 24, 2010. Shogakukan published another four-volume edition under the Tentōmushi Comics imprint from July 27 to October 25, 2018.

=== Anime ===
An anime film, titled 21 Emon: Uchū e Irasshai! (21エモン 宇宙へいらっしゃい!; "21 Emon: Welcome to Space!"), animated by Shin-Ei Animation and directed by Tsutomu Shibayama, premiered on August 1, 1981.

A 39-episode anime television series, animated by Shin-Ei Animation and directed by Keiichi Hara, was broadcast on TV Asahi from May 2, 1991, to March 26, 1992.

A second anime film, titled 21 Emon: Soraike! Hadashi no Princess (21エモン 宇宙いけ! 裸足のプリンセス; "21 Emon: Outer Space! Barefoot Princess"), premiered on March 7, 1992.
