= Angie Girl =

Japanese anime television series

- Screenshot of the main character of the anime series
- 女王陛下のプティアンジェ
- Genre: Historical mystery
- Written by: Yu Yamamoto
- Directed by: Fumio Kurokawa
- Music by: Hiroshi Tsutsui
- Country of origin: Japan
- Original language: Japanese
- No. of episodes: 26

Production
- Executive producer: Koichi Motohashi
- Producer: Yoshihiro Ōba
- Production companies: Asahi Broadcasting Corporation; Nippon Animation

Original release
- Network: ANN (ABC, TV Asahi)
- Release: 13 December 1977 – 27 June 1978

Angie Girl (女王陛下のプティアンジェ, Joō-heika no Puti Anje; lit. Her Majesty's Petite Angie) is a 1977 Japanese animated television series produced by Nippon Animation and Ashi Productions.

== Plot ==
Angie Islington is a young 12-year-old noble girl who loves to investigate cases. One day, she stumbles upon a case of robbery which involves the Queen of the United Kingdom's ring that had gone missing during a garden party. Rewarded with a new title of honorary detective and a pendant an emblem of recognition, she embarks on an adventure. She is assisted by Inspector Jackson, a detective of the Scotland Yard, his dashing assistant Michael, and Angie's best friend Frank. They are going to settle numerous problems and bring peace back into the town.

== Setting ==
Originally planned by Takahara Planning to have a story of a Gypsy girl travelling across Spain looking for her mother, the series transformed into a British detective drama. Set in the 19th century of London, the whole city has an old rustic vibe, yet still appears to be modern. Landmarks such as the Big Ben is present in the story giving an insight of the foreign world of English history.

Inspector Jackson is never fond of Angie as he constantly feel threatened by the fact that the 12-year-old girl is much sharper and intelligent, eventually taking his spotlight away from him. Throughout the whole series, Angie has difficulty in gaining trust on adults whom she just met. That thought of doubt however, vanished as soon as they saw the pendant that the Queen awarded to Angie for claiming her lost ring. The pendant has an inscription behind it written "Protect Charlotte in my name; Victoria Queen of England", which tells anyone who are brave enough go against her will have to address to the Queen themselves.

== Cast ==
- Keiko Han as Angie
- Kōko Kikuchi as Poppins
- Ichirō Nagai as Jackson
- Kaneta Kimotsuki as Benjamin
- Kazuyuki Sogabe as Michael
- Miyoko Aso as Barbara
- Seiko Nakano as Frank
- Takeshi Aono as Roger
- Tetsuo Mizutori as Alfred
- Toku Nishio as Jimmy
- Yōko Asagami as Helen
- Yūji Fujishiro as Hirari

== International titles ==
- Angie, détective en herbe (French)
- Annemarie (Dutch)
- Charlotte Holmes
- 女王陛下のプティアンジェ (Japanese)
- Przygody Charlotte Holmes (Polish)
- The Casebook of Charlotte Holmes
- Её Высочество малышка Энджи (Russian)
- إنجي (Arabic)
- المتحرية إنجي (Arabic)
- شارلوت (Arabic)

== Broadcast ==
Angie Girl aired on ABC from 13 December 1977 to 27 June 1978.

Some episodes of Angie Girl were released in the United States as part of The Casebook of Charlotte Holmes. The stories were framed by live-action segments featuring actors Michael Evans and Bernard Fox playing the roles of Sherlock Holmes and John Watson. Some segments featured Michael Allinson as Holmes.
