= Space Boy Soran =

Japanese anime television series

宇宙少年ソラン (Uchū Shōnen Soran)
- Anime television series
- Directed by: Haruyuki Kawajima
- Written by: Masaki Tsuji
- Music by: Taku Izumi
- Studio: TCJ
- Original run: May 4, 1965 – March 28, 1967
- Episodes: 96
- Anime television film
- Released: July 24, 1965
- Runtime: 25 minutes
- Manga
- Written by: Kazuya Fukumoto
- Illustrated by: Yoshikatsu Miyakoshi
- Published by: Kodansha
- Magazine: Weekly Shōnen Magazine
- Original run: 1965 – 1966

Space Boy Soran (宇宙少年ソラン, Uchū Shōnen Soran) is a Japanese black and white anime television series created by Kazuya Fukumoto and Yoshikatsu Miyakoshi. The series was released on DVD in 2015.

== Plot ==
Dr. Tachibana once designed the highly dangerous antiproton bomb and planned to escape Earth with his wife and children for fear of prosecution. On their way in space, their space ship is almost destroyed and only Dr. Tachibana's children, his son and his daughter, escape. The son is rescued by aliens called the Soran, who live on a planet with 15 times the gravity of Earth. They name him Soran after their planet and he is turned into a cyborg to save his life. He returns to Earth to search for his sister who escaped, but is yet to be found. He then lives with the archaeologist Dr. Kotsuki and his daughter Mika. and teams up with his pet squirrel, Chappy.

== Wonder Three incident ==
The character of Chappy was believed to be ripped off of a character Osamu Tezuka was creating. In fear of plagiarising, Tezuka's Wonder Three manga had to be serialized in Weekly Shōnen Sunday instead of Weekly Shōnen Magazine, where the Soran manga was serialized. This is actually called the "Wonder Three incident" (W3事件). Chappy appeared to be like the initial design for Bokko, who was supposed to be a squirrel; she was thus changed to a rabbit. Yoshikatsu Miyakoshi was also a former worker for Tezuka. Several members of Mushi Productions were fired or left due to suspicion of industrial espionage.
