= List of Doraemon films =

This list of Doraemon films includes both feature-length and short films based on its manga and anime series. Since 1980, all of these films to date have been released by Toho. Toho currently holds worldwide distribution and licensing rights for all of the films in the series. As of 2026, there are 45 feature films, 2 special feature films, and over 30 short films.

At the Japanese box office, Doraemon had grossed more than ¥100 billion revenue and sold more than 100 million tickets by 2015, having surpassed Godzilla as the highest-grossing film franchise in Japan. As of 2020, the Doraemon films have grossed a total of ¥187 billion ($1.7 billion) worldwide. Doraemon is on the list of highest-grossing films in Japan, one of the all time highest-grossing non-English film franchises, and one of the highest-grossing animated film franchises worldwide.

== Feature films ==
No.	Title	Original release date
1	"Doraemon: Nobita's Dinosaur"; Transliteration: "Doraemon: Nobita no Kyōryū" (Japanese: ドラえもん のび太の恐竜)	15 March 1980
2	"Doraemon: The Records of Nobita, Spaceblazer"; Transliteration: "Doraemon Nobita no Uchū Kaitakushi" (Japanese: ドラえもん のび太の宇宙開拓史)	14 March 1981
3	"Doraemon: Nobita and the Haunts of Evil"; Transliteration: "Doraemon: Nobita no Daimakyō" (Japanese: ドラえもん: のび太の大魔境)	13 March 1982
4	"Doraemon: Nobita and the Castle of the Undersea Devil"; Transliteration: "Doraemon Nobita no Kaiteiki Ganjō" (Japanese: ドラえもん のび太の海底鬼岩城)	12 March 1983
5	"Doraemon: Nobita's Great Adventure into the Underworld"; Transliteration: "Doraemon: Nobita no Makai Daibōken" (Japanese: ドラえもん: のび太の魔界大冒険)	17 March 1984
6	"Doraemon: Nobita's Little Star Wars"; Transliteration: "Doraemon: Nobita no Ritoru Sutā Wōzu" (Japanese: ドラえもん: のび太の宇宙小戦争(リトル スター ウォズ))	16 March 1985
7	"Doraemon: Nobita and the Steel Troops"; Transliteration: "Doraemon Nobita to Tetsujin Heidan" (Japanese: ドラえもん のび太と鉄人兵団)	15 March 1986
8	"Doraemon: Nobita and the Knights on Dinosaurs"; Transliteration: "Doraemon Nobita to Ryū no Kishi" (Japanese: ドラえもん のび太と竜の騎士)	14 March 1987
9	"Doraemon: The Record of Nobita's Parallel Visit to the West"; Transliteration: "Doraemon: Nobita no Parareru saiyûki" (Japanese: ドラえもん のび太のパラレル西遊記)	12 March 1988
10	"Doraemon: Nobita and the Birth of Japan"; Transliteration: "Doraemon: Nobita no Nippon Tanjō" (Japanese: ドラえもん のび太の日本誕生)	11 March 1989
11	"Doraemon: Nobita and the Animal Planet"; Transliteration: "Doraemon Nobita to Animaru Puranetto" (Japanese: ドラえもん のび太とアニマル惑星(プラネット))	10 March 1990
12	"Doraemon: Nobita's Dorabian Nights"; Transliteration: "Doraemon: Nobita no Dorabian Naito" (Japanese: ドラえもん のび太のドラビアンナイト)	9 March 1991
13	"Doraemon: Nobita and the Kingdom of Clouds"; Transliteration: "Doraemon: Nobita to Kumo no Ōkoku" (Japanese: ドラえもん のび太と雲の王国)	7 March 1992
14	"Doraemon: Nobita and the Tin Labyrinth"; Transliteration: "Doraemon: Nobita to Buriki no Rabirinsu" (Japanese: ドラえもん のび太とブリキの迷宮(ラビリンス))	6 March 1993
15	"Doraemon: Nobita's Three Visionary Swordsmen"; Transliteration: "Doraemon: Nobita to Mugen Sankenshi" (Japanese: ドラえもん: のび太と夢幻三剣士)	12 March 1994
16	"Doraemon: Nobita's Diary on the Creation of the World"; Transliteration: "Doraemon: Nobita no Sōsei Nikki" (Japanese: ドラえもん のび太の創世日記)	4 March 1995
17	"Doraemon: Nobita and the Galaxy Super-express"; Transliteration: "Doraemon: Nobita to Ginga Ekusupuresu" (Japanese: ドラえもん: のび太と銀河超特急(エクスプレス))	2 March 1996
18	"Doraemon: Nobita and the Spiral City"; Transliteration: "Doraemon: Nobita no Nejimaki Shitī Bōkenki" (Japanese: ドラえもん のび太のねじ巻き都市(シティー)冒険記)	8 March 1997
19	"Doraemon: Nobita's Great Adventure in the South Seas"; Transliteration: "Doraemon: Nobita no Nankai Daibōuken" (Japanese: ドラえもん のび太の南海大冒険)	7 March 1998
20	"Doraemon: Nobita Drifts in the Universe"; Transliteration: "Doraemon: Nobita no Uchū Hyōryūki" (Japanese: ドラえもん のび太の宇宙漂流記)	6 March 1999
21	"Doraemon: Nobita and the Legend of the Sun King"; Transliteration: "Doraemon: Nobita no Taiyōō Densetsu" (Japanese: ドラえもん のび太の太陽王伝説)	4 March 2000
22	"Doraemon: Nobita and the Winged Braves"; Transliteration: "Doraemon: Nobita to Tsubasa no Yūsha-tachi" (Japanese: ドラえもん のび太と翼の勇者たち)	10 March 2001
23	"Doraemon: Nobita in the Robot Kingdom"; Transliteration: "Doraemon: Nobita to Robotto Kingudamu" (Japanese: ドラえもん のび太とロボット王国(キングダム))	9 March 2002
24	"Doraemon: Nobita and the Windmasters"; Transliteration: "Doraemon: Nobita to Fushigi Kazetsukai" (Japanese: ドラえもん のび太とふしぎ風使い)	8 March 2003
25	"Doraemon: Nobita in the Wan-Nyan Spacetime Odyssey"; Transliteration: "Doraemon: Nobita no Wan-Nyan Jikūden" (Japanese: ドラえもん のび太のワンニャン時空伝)	6 March 2004
26	"Doraemon: Nobita's Dinosaur 2006"; Transliteration: "Eiga Doraemon: Nobita no Kyōryū 2006" (Japanese: 映画ドラえもん のび太の恐竜2006)	4 March 2006
27	"Doraemon: Nobita's New Great Adventure into the Underworld"; Transliteration: "Eiga Doraemon: Nobita no Shin Makai Daibōken ~7-nin no Mahō Tsukai~" (Japanese: 映画ドラえもん のび太の新魔界大冒険 〜7人の魔法使い〜)	10 March 2007
28	"Doraemon: Nobita and the Green Giant Legend"; Transliteration: "Eiga Doraemon: Nobita to Midori no Kyojinden" (Japanese: 映画 ドラえもん のび太と緑の巨人伝)	8 March 2008
29	"Doraemon: The New Record of Nobita's Spaceblazer"; Transliteration: "Eiga Doraemon: Shin • Nobita No Uchu Kaitakushi" (Japanese: 映画ドラえもん 新・のび太の宇宙開拓史)	7 March 2009
30	"Doraemon: Nobita's Great Battle of the Mermaid King"; Transliteration: "Doraemon: Nobita no Ningyo Daikaisen" (Japanese: ドラえもん のび太の人魚大海戦)	6 March 2010
31	"Doraemon: Nobita and the New Steel Troops ~Winged Angels~"; Transliteration: "Eiga Doraemon: Shin • Nobita to Tetsujin Heidan ~Habatake Tenshi Tachi~" (Japanese: 映画ドラえもん 新・のび太と鉄人兵団 ～はばたけ 天使たち～)	5 March 2011
32	"Doraemon: Nobita and the Island of Miracles ~Animal Adventure~"; Transliteration: "Eiga Doraemon Nobita to Kiseki no Shima 〜Animaru Adobenchā〜" (Japanese: 映画ドラえもん のび太と奇跡の島 ～アニマル アドベンチャー～)	3 March 2012
33	"Doraemon: Nobita's Secret Gadget Museum"; Transliteration: "Doraemon: Nobita no Himitsu Dōgu Museum" (Japanese: ドラえもん のび太のひみつ道具博物館(ミュージアム))	9 March 2013
34	"Doraemon: Nobita in the New Haunts of Evil ~ Peko and the Five Explorers ~"; Transliteration: "Eiga Doraemon: Shin • Nobita no Daimakyo ~Peko to 5-nin no Tankentai~" (Japanese: 映画ドラえもん 新・のび太の大魔境〜ペコと5人の探検隊〜)	8 March 2014
35	"Doraemon: Nobita's Space Heroes"; Transliteration: "Doraemon: Nobita no Space Heroes" (Japanese: ドラえもん のび太の宇宙英雄記(スペースヒーローズ))	7 March 2015
36	"Doraemon: Nobita and the Birth of Japan 2016"; Transliteration: "Doraemon: Shin • Nobita no Nippon Tanjō" (Japanese: ドラえもん 新・のび太の日本誕生)	5 March 2016
37	"Doraemon: Nobita's Great Adventure in the Antarctic Kachi Kochi"; Transliteration: "Doraemon: Nobita no Nankyoku kachikochi dai bōken" (Japanese: ドラえもん のび太の南極カチコチ大冒険)	4 March 2017
38	"Doraemon: Nobita's Treasure Island"; Transliteration: "Doraemon: Nobita no Takarajima" (Japanese: ドラえもん のび太の宝島)	3 March 2018
39	"Doraemon: Nobita's Chronicle of the Moon Exploration"; Transliteration: "Doraemon: Nobita no Getsumen Tansa-ki" (Japanese: ドラえもん のび太の月面探査記)	1 March 2019
40	"Doraemon: Nobita's New Dinosaur"; Transliteration: "Doraemon: Nobita no Shin Kyōryū" (Japanese: ドラえもん のび太の新恐竜)	7 August 2020
41	"Doraemon: Nobita's Little Star Wars 2021"; Transliteration: "Doraemon: Nobita no Ritoru Sutā Wōzu 2021" (Japanese: 映画ドラえもん: のび太の 宇宙小戦争(リトル スター ウォーズ)2021)	4 March 2022
42	"Doraemon: Nobita's Sky Utopia"; Transliteration: "Doraemon: Nobita to Sora no Utopia" (Japanese: 映画ドラえもん: のび太と 空の理想郷(ユートピア))	3 March 2023
43	"Doraemon: Nobita's Earth Symphony"; Transliteration: "Doraemon: Nobita no chikyū shinfonī" (Japanese: 映画ドラえもん:のび太の地球交響楽(シンフォニー))	1 March 2024
44	"Doraemon: Nobita's Art World Tales"; Transliteration: "Doraemon: Nobita no Esekai Monogatari" (Japanese: ドラえもん のび太の絵世界物語)	7 March 2025
45	"Doraemon: New Nobita and the Castle of the Undersea Devil"; Transliteration: "Doraemon: Shin・Nobita no Kaiteiki Ganjō" (Japanese: ドラえもん 新・のび太の海底鬼岩城)	27 February 2026
46	"Doraemon: Nobita's Steam-Powered Time Machine"; Transliteration: "Eiga Doraemon Nobita no Joukijikansha" (Japanese: 映画ドラえもん のび太の蒸気時間車)	5 March 2027

=== Stand by Me films ===
No.	Title	Original release date
1	"Stand by Me Doraemon" (Japanese: スタンド・バイ・ミー ドラえもん)	8 August 2014
2	"Stand by Me Doraemon 2" (Japanese: スタンド・バイ・ミー ドラえもん 2)	20 November 2020

== Short films ==
These short films, below were shown alongside the feature-length movies above. The only exceptions were Doraemon: Ken-chan's Adventure, which was produced as part of the campaign to commemorate the International Year of Disabled Persons in 1981, and Doraemon: What Am I For Momotaro?, which was shown alongside 21 Emon: Uchū e Irasshai!.

No.	Title	Original release date
1	"Doraemon: Ken-chan's Adventure" (Japanese: ドラえもん ケンちゃんの冒険)	July 1981
2	"Doraemon: What Am I for Momotaro" (Japanese: ドラえもん ぼく、桃太郎のなんなのさ)	1 August 1981
3	"Mini Dora SOS!!!" (Japanese: ミニドラSOS!!)	11 March 1989
4	"Wow, The Kid Gang of Bandits!" (Japanese: アララ少年山賊団!)	9 March 1991
5	"In A Thrilling Solar Car" (Japanese: トキメキソーラーくるまによん)	7 March 1992
6	"Hello, Dynosis Kids!!" (Japanese: ハロー恐竜キッズ!!)	6 March 1993
7	"The Sun Is Our Friend: Hold Out, the Soraemon!" (Japanese: 太陽は友だち がんばれ!ソラえもん号)	6 March 1993
8	"A Blue Straw Hat" (Japanese: 青いストローハット)	12 March 1994
9	"2112: The Birth of Doraemon" (Japanese: 2112年ドラえもん誕生)	4 March 1995
10	"Dorami & Doraemons: Robot School's Seven Mysteries!?" (Japanese: ドラミ&ドラえもんズ ロボット学校七不思議!?)	2 March 1996
11	"The Doraemons: The Puzzling Challenge Letter of the Mysterious Thief Dorapin!" (Japanese: ザ☆ドラえもんズ 怪盗ドラパン謎の挑戦状!)	8 March 1997
12	"Doraemon Comes Back" (Japanese: 帰ってきたドラえもん)	7 March 1998
13	"The Doraemons: The Great Operating of Springing Insects!" (Japanese: ザ☆ドラえもんズ ムシムシぴょんぴょん大作戦!)	7 March 1998
14	"Nobita's the Night Before a Wedding" (Japanese: のび太の結婚前夜)	6 March 1999
15	"The Doraemons: Funny Candy of Okashinana!?" (Japanese: ザ☆ドラえもんズ おかしなお菓子なオカシナナ?)	6 March 1999
16	"A Grandmother's Recollections" (Japanese: おばあちゃんの思い出)	11 March 2000
17	"The Doraemons: Doki Doki Wildcat Engine!" (Japanese: ザ☆ドラえもんズ ドキドキ機関車大爆走!)	11 March 2000
18	"Dorami & Doraemons: Space Land's Critical Event!" (Japanese: ドラミ&ドラえもんズ 宇宙ランド危機イッパツ!)	10 March 2001
19	"Good Luck! Gian!!" (Japanese: がんばれ!ジャイアン!!)	10 March 2001
20	"The Day When I Was Born" (Japanese: ぼくの生まれた日)	9 March 2002
21	"The Doraemons: Goal! Goal! Goal!!" (Japanese: ザ☆ドラえもんズ ゴール!ゴール!ゴール!!)	9 March 2002
22	"Doraemon's 25th Anniversary" (Japanese: ドラえもんアニバーサリー25)	6 March 2004

=== F-Theater ===
The following short films have been shown or are being screened at the Fujiko F. Fujio theater (Fシアター) in Japan:

No.	Title	Original release date
1	"Doraemon and Perman Close Call!? (ドラえもん&パーマン危機一髪!?)"	September 2011
2	"21 Emon & Doraemon: Welcome to Hotel Tsunesha (21エモン&ドラえもん ようこそ!ホテルつづれ屋へ)"	3 October 2012
3	"Susume Roboketto & Doraemon: Decisive Battle! Tornado Castle on the Cloud (すすめロボケット&ドラえもん 『「決戦！雲の上の竜巻城』)"	28 August 2013
4	"Doraemon & Chimpui: Eli-sama's gift of gifts for love (ドラえもん&チンプイ 『エリ様 愛のプレゼント大作戦』)"	3 September 2014
5	"Kiteretsu Encyclopedia & Doraemon: Koro Assistance 's First Approach (キテレツ大百科&ドラえもん 『コロ助のはじめてのおつかい』)"	3 September 2015
6	"Pokonyan & Doraemon: Here pure cat in Pompoko Nyan!? (ポコニャン&ドラえもん 『ポンポコニャンで ここほれニャンニャン！？』)"	3 September 2016
7	"Umeboshi Denka & Doraemon: Papparopan's SuperPappa! (ウメ星デンカ&ドラえもん 『パンパロパンの スッパッパ！』)"	1 September 2017
8	"Doraemon & F-character All-Stars: a big pinch in the lunar race!? (ドラえもん& F キャラオールスターズ 『月面レースで大ピンチ！？』)"	9 March 2019
9	"Doraemon's Birth / Nobita the star? (『ドラえもん誕生』『セイカイはのび太？』)"	2020
10	"Doraemon & F-character All-Stars: Slightly Mysterious Bullet Train (Express)! (ドラえもん&Fキャラオールスターズ 『すこし不思議超特急（エクスプレス）』！)"	1 September 2021
11	"Doraemon & F-Chara All Stars: Yume no Machi, F Land (ドラえもん&Fキャラオールスターズ「ゆめの町、Fランド」)"	21 February 2024

== Box office performance ==
Box office performance
Film	Release year	Ticket sales (Japan)	Box office gross revenue	
Film	Release year	Ticket sales (Japan)	Japan	Overseas
Doraemon: Nobita's Dinosaur	1980	60,720,000	¥2,640,000,000	Unknown
The Records of Nobita, Spaceblazer	1981	60,720,000	¥2,980,000,000	Unknown
Nobita and the Haunts of Evil	1982	60,720,000	¥2,070,000,000	Unknown
Nobita and the Castle of the Undersea Devil	1983	60,720,000	¥1,700,000,000	Unknown
Nobita's Great Adventure into the Underworld	1984	60,720,000	¥2,810,000,000	Unknown
Nobita's Little Star Wars	1985	60,720,000	¥2,040,000,000	Unknown
Nobita and the Steel Troops	1986	60,720,000	¥2,210,000,000	Unknown
Nobita and the Knights on Dinosaurs	1987	60,720,000	¥2,550,000,000	Unknown
The Record of Nobita's Parallel Visit to the West	1988	60,720,000	¥2,310,000,000	Unknown
Nobita and the Birth of Japan	1989	60,720,000	¥3,430,000,000	Unknown
Nobita and the Animal Planet	1990	60,720,000	¥3,250,000,000	Unknown
Nobita's Dorabian Nights	1991	60,720,000	¥3,060,000,000	Unknown
Nobita and the Kingdom of Clouds	1992	60,720,000	¥2,860,000,000	Unknown
Nobita and the Tin Labyrinth	1993	60,720,000	¥2,810,000,000	Unknown
Nobita's Three Visionary Swordsmen	1994	60,720,000	¥2,300,000,000	Unknown
Nobita's Diary on the Creation of the World	1995	60,720,000	¥2,210,000,000	Unknown
Nobita and the Galaxy Super-express	1996	60,720,000	¥2,720,000,000	Unknown
Nobita and the Spiral City	1997	17,550,000	¥3,400,000,000	Unknown
Nobita's Great Adventure in the South Seas	1998	17,550,000	¥3,570,000,000	Unknown
Nobita Drifts in the Universe	1999	17,550,000	¥3,400,000,000	Unknown
Nobita and the Legend of the Sun King	2000	17,550,000	¥3,050,000,000	Unknown
Nobita and the Winged Braves	2001	17,550,000	¥3,000,000,000	Unknown
Nobita in the Robot Kingdom	2002	17,550,000	¥2,310,000,000	$723,229
Nobita and the Windmasters	2003	17,550,000	¥2,540,000,000	$1,401,849
Nobita in the Wan-Nyan Spacetime Odyssey	2004	17,550,000	¥3,050,000,000	$549,304
Nobita's Dinosaur 2006	2006	2,970,000	¥3,280,000,000	$5,375,823 (Note: Nobita's Dinosaur 2006 overseas box office: China – CN¥22.4 million ($2,944,269); South Korea – ₩1,481,894,577 ($1,337,097); Other territories – $1,094,454)
Nobita's New Great Adventure into the Underworld	2007	3,260,000	¥3,540,000,000	$4,352,792 (Note: Nobita's New Great Adventure into the Underworld overseas box office: China – CN¥12,979,000 ($1,867,751); Other territories – $2,485,041)
Nobita and the Green Giant Legend	2008	3,130,000	¥3,370,000,000	$3,334,403 (Note: Nobita and the Green Giant Legend overseas box office: China – CN¥19,938,000 ($2,918,753); Other territories – $415,650)
Nobita's Spaceblazer	2009	2,300,000	¥2,450,000,000	$1,596,436
Nobita's Great Battle of the Mermaid King	2010	2,980,000	¥3,160,000,000	$2,295,514 (Note: Nobita's Great Battle of the Mermaid King overseas box office: South Korea – ₩1,769,482,593 ($1,596,585); Other territories – $698,926)
Nobita and the New Steel Troops—Winged Angels	2011	2,270,000	¥2,460,000,000	$1,334,369
Nobita and the Island of Miracles—Animal Adventure	2012	3,310,000	¥3,620,000,000	$1,674,089 (Note: Nobita and the Island of Miracles overseas box office: South Korea – ₩1,071,505,500 ($951,206); Other territories – $722,883)
Nobita's Secret Gadget Museum	2013	3,650,000	¥3,980,000,000	$2,882,956 (Note: Nobita's Secret Gadget Museum overseas box office: South Korea – ₩781,495,500 ($713,790); Other territories – $2,169,164)
New Nobita's Great Demon—Peko and the Exploration Party of Five	2014	3,260,000	¥3,580,000,000	$2,651,639 (Note: New Nobita's Great Demon overseas box office: South Korea – ₩1,200,164,300 ($1,139,800); Other territories – $1,555,448)
Stand by Me Doraemon	2014	6,250,000	¥8,380,000,000	$183,442,714 (Note: Stand by Me Doraemon overseas box office: South Korea – ₩3,685,503,429 ($3,500,134); Other territories – $183,442,714)
Nobita's Space Heroes	2015	3,510,000	¥3,930,000,000	$3,406,274 (Note: Nobita's Space Heroes overseas box office: South Korea – ₩816,868,100 ($722,152); Other territories – $2,684,122)
Nobita and the Birth of Japan 2016	2016	3,630,000	¥4,120,000,000	$17,270,593 (Note: Nobita and the Birth of Japan 2016 overseas box office: China – $15.6 million; Hong Kong – HK$4.46 million (US$574,572); Italy – $522,276; South Korea – ₩525,099,600 ($452,503); Turkey – $121,173)
Doraemon the Movie 2017: Great Adventure in the Antarctic Kachi Kochi	2017	3,890,000	¥4,430,000,000	$24,302,752 (Note: Doraemon the Movie 2017 overseas box office: China – CN¥149 million ($22,045,333); South Korea & Turkey – $1,117,335; Hong Kong – HK$8.16 million (US$1,047,067); Italy – $92,755)
Doraemon the Movie 2018: Nobita's Treasure Island	2018	4,680,000	¥5,370,000,000	$33,812,757
Doraemon: Nobita's Chronicle of the Moon Exploration	2019	4,370,000	¥5,020,000,000	$21,025,896 (Note: Nobita's Chronicle of the Moon Exploration overseas box office: China – $18.8 million; Hong Kong – $1.15 million; Vietnam – $1,055,849)
Doraemon: Nobita's New Dinosaur	2020	2,760,000	¥3,350,000,000	$11,522,851
Stand by Me Doraemon 2	2020	2,260,000	¥2,780,000,000	$65,201,374 (Note: Stand by Me Doraemon 2 overseas box office: South Korea – ₩2,667,298,050 ($676,436); Other territories – $65,192,394)
Nobita's Little Star Wars 2021	2022	1,784,513	¥2,690,000,000	Unknown
Doraemon: Nobita's Sky Utopia	2023	3,620,000	¥4,340,000,000	$37,475,850
Doraemon: Nobita's Earth Symphony	2024	3,561,328	¥4,310,000,000	$30,187,415
Doraemon: Nobita's Art World Tales	2025	3,798,000	¥4,600,000,000	Unknown
Regional total		149,513,841	¥151,030,000,000	$455,820,879
Worldwide total			¥187,000,000,000 ($1,700,000,000)	
