= The Doraemons =

Japanese manga series

- The Doraemons as depicted in the manga series. In clockwise direction, from bottom left: Dora-nichov, Wang Dora, Dora-med III, Dora-the-Kid, Dora-rinho, El Matadora. In the middle: Doraemon.

ザ・ドラえもんズ (Za Doraemonzu)
- Created by: Fujiko F. Fujio
- Manga
- Written by: Michiaki Tanaka
- Published by: Shogakukan
- English publisher: Kim Dong Publishing House (Vietnam)
- Magazine: CoroCoro Comic; Bessatsu CoroCoro Comic
- Original run: December 16, 1995 – March 28, 2001
- Volumes: 6
- Manga

The Doraemons Special
- Written by: Masaru Miyazaki
- Illustrated by: Yukihiro Mitani
- Published by: Shogakukan
- English publisher: Kim Dong Publishing House (Vietnam)
- Magazine: Shōgaku Go Nensei; Shōgaku Roku Nensei
- Original run: December 16, 1996 – September 28, 2002
- Volumes: 12
- Manga

The Doraemons Special: Robot Training School
- Written by: Yukihiro Mitani
- Published by: Shogakukan
- English publisher: Kim Dong Publishing House (Vietnam)
- Magazine: Shōgaku Yon Nensei
- Original run: May 28, 1999 – January 28, 2003
- Volumes: 3
- Related works
- Doraemon; Doraemon Long Stories; Dorabase

The Doraemons (ザ・ドラえもんズ, Za Doraemonzu) is a Japanese manga series that is a spin-off of the long-running Doraemon series.

The subseries includes two versions of the manga by Michiaki Tanaka (田中 道明, Tanaka Michiaki) and Yukihiro Mitani (三谷 幸広, Mitani Yukihiro) from 1995 to 2003, and a series of animated short films from 1996 to 2002.

== Synopsis ==
The Doraemons, or Dora Dora Seven DD7, is an old boys' association of the Robot School (ロボット学校, Robotto Gakkō) that Doraemon attended. All of the seven male members are cat-like robots of the same type; they enjoy dorayaki, but usually add their own seasoning. They have rock-hard heads that they can use as a weapon or to break things. Doraemon has an especially hard head, since he has no other special weapons, and has no ears or hat to get in the way when using this mode of attack. The gadget that can connect them is the Friendship Telecard. It takes the form of a telephone card, where they can call each other with the card from anywhere when one of them is in need.

== Creation and conception ==
The subseries originated from a video game released in 1995 that featured the six characters who had previously appeared in the 1995 short film 2112: The Birth of Doraemon. The original author of the Doraemon series, Fujiko F. Fujio, agrees with the existence of the spin-off series and adds the settings from the series to the original series, even though the settings would not appear in any of the original manga and anime series.

== Characters ==
=== Main characters ===
The Doraemons are the main characters of the series. They are a group of seven robotic cats based on Doraemon, each with their own nationalities and personalities. One or more of them has played a prominent role in several manga volumes as well as the anime short films.

==== Doraemon ====
Voiced by: Nobuyo Ōyama (April 1979 – March 2005)
Doraemon (ドラえもん) is the titular character and co-protagonist of the main series, residing in Japan. He was sent back in time from the future by his owner, Sewashi, to help aid Nobita, the great-great-grandfather of Sewashi. He often gets angry and/or irritated when others mistaken him for a racoon dog due to his lack of ears as well as his resemblance to one, which became a recurring gag in the main series. He is the most optimistic and moderate member of the seven cat robots, and often acts as the leader of the team in several occasions. He has the normal four-dimensional pocket on his stomach, and likes to have plain dorayaki.

===== Yellow Doraemon =====
Voiced by: Chisa Yokoyama (March 1995, March 1998)
This was the original version of Doraemon before he became a familiar blue, appearing in the chapters set when the Doraemons were still in the Robot School (as well as the 1995 short film 2112: The Birth of Doraemon and the 1998 short film The Great Operating of Springing Insects). Like all of the other Doraemon-type cat robots that were being manufactured and produced around the time he was built, he has yellow skin, which makes him resemble his sister, Dorami (who at the time had not yet been manufactured), even more, as well as ears, which had been eaten by mice by the time Doraemon first visited Nobita. He also had a high-pitched voice at that time, which was toned down significantly when he wept uncontrollably after accidentally using "Source of Tragedy" instead of "Source of Energy" in an attempt to cheer himself up after losing his ears. He was a manufacturing defect due to an accident at the factory that caused him to lose a screw bolt and ended up failing in several tests afterwards. As a result, he was put in a special position in the Robot School with the other special robots, including several cat robots that would later become members of The Doraemons as well as his girlfriend Noramyako, who was an ordinary female cat robot in the main series while she was a dancer in the 1995 short film and the spin-off series. This Doraemon was eventually bought by Nobita's great great-grandson, Sewashi, whom Doraemon aided him for several years. Like his current-day counterpart, he has a four-dimensional pocket on his stomach and enjoys dorayaki.

==== Dora-the-Kid ====
Voiced by: Chisa Yokoyama (March 1995), Yoku Shioya (April 1995), Keiichi Nanba (March 1996 – March 2001, 2002)
Dora-the-Kid (ドラ・ザ・キッド, Dora za Kiddo) is an American robotic cat based on Doraemon. Nicknamed Kid, he works for a sheriff's deputy in Texas, USA (which was changed to a Western-style planet in some versions), with the old sheriff captain and his granddaughter Anyi. Kid is also a secret agent of the Time Patrol Police. In one chapter of the manga, he is best known as a samurai. He is good at quick shooting like Nobita, however he has a fear of heights (acrophobia). Kid's weapon of choice is the Air Gun, a gadget that can shoot out a big blast of air that can knock down anyone that gets hit. The Air Gun appears to be the front muzzle of a giant revolver that is equipped onto Kid's arm (He has no fingers to fire a regular pistol). Like with Doraemon's original counterpart, Kid has yellow skin and ears. His variation of Doraemon's four-dimensional Pocket is the four-dimensional hat (四次元ハット, yonjigen hatto) that Kid wears on his head. Kid enjoys his dorayaki with ketchup and mustard on it, much like a hot dog. In one of the Doraemons specials, he tries to let Doraemon eat a dorayaki shaped like a mouse but Doraemon declines, due to his fear of mice. Though he thinks girls are troublesome most of the time, he is often the sweet (or romantic) character when he faces girls. This is proven when he and Dorami fell in love with each other.
Throughout various chapters of the story, Dora-the-Kid has been described as a symbol of the American patriotism.

==== Wang Dora ====
Voiced by: Kumiko Nishihara (March 1995 — April 1995), Megumi Hayashibara (March 1996 – March 2001, 2002)
Wang Dora (王ドラ, Wan Dora; Chinese: 王哆啦) is a Chinese robotic cat based on Doraemon. He is the smartest member among the Doraemons and is a master of kung fu. He studies medicine in the Qing Dynasty while he works for an assistant of a doctor of Chinese medicine. He is uncomfortable around girls (often spiraling out of control after seeing one), even though he has a girlfriend, a female robot called Mimiko. Wang Dora's variation of the four-dimensional pocket is the four-dimensional sleeves (四次元そで, yonjigen sode) on his shirt. He enjoys his dorayaki with rāyu. He is best friends with El Matadora, however they are both rivals and have often clashed with each other multiple times, so they fight often.

==== Dora-med III ====
Voiced by: Masaharu Satō (April 1995 – March 2001, 2002)
Dora-med III (ドラメッドIII世, Dora-meddo Sansei; Arabic: دورا ميد الثالث; Hebrew: דורה-ים-תיכוני השלישי; Persian: دورا-مد ۳) is an Arabian robotic cat based on Doraemon. He wears Arabian clothes and forecasts from the tarot. He chose to be a royal consultant in Saudi Arabia on the Middle East, but despite being Saudi Arabian, his home is actually located in Baghdad, Iraq. He is quite proficient in magic and the black arts. He cannot swim, however, due to his fear of water. When he gets angry, he grows several times his size (proportional to how angry he is,) becoming a giant. His dream is to open a "Water Land" theme park for children who live in desert regions. Dora-Med III's variation of the four-dimensional pocket is his four-dimensional magic lamp (四次元ランプ, yonjigen ranpu), however he also has the normal four-dimensional pocket on his stomach as a backup that he used briefly at the end of the 1997 short film. He enjoys his dorayaki frozen due to his fear of water.
He first made his initial appearance as a non-speaking character in the 1995 short film, but was eventually given a full speaking role for the first time in the 1995 3DO game, using the voice that would later be carried over to the short film series.

==== Dora-nichov ====
Voiced by: Mieko Suzuki (Note: Credited as Teiyū Ichiryūsai) (March 1995 — April 1995), Toshiharu Sakurai (March 1996 – March 2001, 2002)
Dora-nichov (ドラニコフ, Dora-nikofu; Russian: Дора-ников) is a Russian robotic cat based on Doraemon. He is a silent member of the Doraemons, living in Siberia, Russia. As one of the poorest members in The Doraemons, he is a Cossack, whose clothes derived from the historic Siberian Cossack farmers of the past. He often works in Hollywood as a popular movie actor of the Werewolf series in the 22nd century, and even travels back in time to when Russia was ruled by Tsar Nicholas II as well as Boris Yeltsin's era. He is taciturn (and can only communicate with growls, etc.) and is extremely sensitive to the cold. He can transform himself into a wolf if he looks at something that looks like the moon; in this form, he can attack enemies by biting or simply wreaking havoc, etc. He is able to blow fire out of his mouth by taking something hot like Tabasco. Dora-nichov uses the four-dimensional scarf (四次元マフラー, yonjigen mafurā) covering his face as an alternative to the four-dimensional pocket. He likes his dorayaki with dog food, however he usually does not eat dorayaki in front of others because the round shape of the snack would accidentally transform him into a wolf and cause him to wreak havoc. He would often close or cover his eyes while eating dorayaki to prevent him from transforming. His love interest is Momo in the anime, who is a student of the school he attended in; in the manga, his love interest is Nina, a poor Russian singer living in Moscow who later becomes popular thanks to him.
While he is primarily portrayed as a silent character, the 1995 3DO game breaks his silence by giving him a full speaking role near the end of the game, speaking complete lines of dialogue rather than just making noises; the voice used for his brief speaking role is very similar to that of Dora-rinho. This does not carry over to the short film series. His tone of voice was also changed into a more rough-sounding one in the short film series as well. He has only spoken out loud once in the manga, and on several occasions he has some inner monologue moments.

==== El Matadora ====
Voiced by: Kazue Ikura (March 1995 — April 1995), Kyousei Tsukui (March 1996), Ryūsei Nakao (December 1996 – March 2001, 2002)
El Matadora (エル・マタドーラ, Eru Matadōra) is a Spanish robotic cat based on Doraemon. He is the strongest member of the team. He likes napping (siesta), even naps in any danger or anywhere when he wants to. He lives in Barcelona, Spain and works for a roast meat restaurant "Carmen" (which is named after the daughter of the chef, and also El's love interest, Carmen), but also masking himself to save the poor, as an alter-ego Keikai-Dora, a parody of Zorro (This form isn't much different from his original appearance, except with his Magic Cloak pulled over the top of his head). His Magic Cloak can blow enemies away or deflect bullets, among others. Unlike his friendly rival Wang Dora, he is a playboy among girls. His dream is to become a famous bullfighter, otherwise known as a matador. He likes dorayaki with spaghetti sauce. El Matadora is the only other Doraemon robots (other than Doraemon himself) to use the four-dimensional pocket on his stomach, and is the only Doraemons member to have ox horns instead of cat ears.

==== Dora-rinho ====
Voiced by: Mieko Suzuki (Note: Credited as Mie Suzuki from 1995–1998 and Teiyū Ichiryūsai from 1999–2001) (March 1995 – March 2001, 2002)
Dora-rinho (ドラリーニョ, Dora Rīnyo) is a Brazilian robotic cat based on Doraemon. He is the quickest member of the team, who can run very fast and possesses many powerful soccer skills but tends to be very forgetful. He lives in Brazil and spends days in playing association football with the Mini-Doras (ミニドラ軍団, Mini-Dora Gundan; lit. Mini-Dora Army). The Mini-Doras each has a miniature version of Doraemon's four-dimensional pocket that Dora-rinho could take gadgets from; though the gadgets are equally as small as the Mini-Doras. He is also the coach of a Brazilian boy named Nobinho (ノビーニョ, Nobīnyo). He can attack enemies by kicking soccer balls at them. He enjoys dorayaki with Tabasco sauce. He wears an orange uniform and has a cat bell in the form of a soccer ball. In some cases in the manga, his soccer-shaped bell turns into an ordinary-looking cat bell when he is angry, whereas in other instances and even in the anime short films it stays the same. He often has derpy eyes, with pupils resembling that of a shocked eye expression within the Doraemon series.

=== Supporting characters ===
There has been a significant number of characters that play as supporting roles in The Doraemons. Several characters in this list includes characters from the mainline Doraemon series, antagonists, and significant real and famous figures. In the manga, cultural connection and historical legitimacy are highly noticed.

==== Dorami ====
Voiced by: Keiko Yokozawa (April 1980 — March 2005)
Dorami (ドラミ) is Doraemon's younger sister, who first appeared in the main series. She is the love interest and girlfriend of Dora-the-Kid. She appears prominently in two short films within the spin-off series, including the 1996 short film (which was also adapted into the manga format) where Dorami's graduation ceremony in the Robot School that the Doraemons plan to attend goes awry when a disposed school guardian wakes up and brainwashes all robots. She and Dora-the-Kid are the only ones who managed to escape and free the school from that guardian. They develop a stronger relationship after that incident.

==== Principal Teraodai ====
Voiced by: Ichirō Nagai (March 1995, March 1998, June 2002), Yasuhiro Takato (September 2007)
Principal Teraodai (寺尾台校長, Teraodai-kōchō) is the principal of the Robot School in the 22nd century, the inventor of the cat robots, and also the great-grandson of Hiroshi Teraodai (寺尾台ヒロシ, Teraodai Hiroshi), the principal of Public Tsukimidai Elementary School (the elementary school that Nobita attends in the main series). He grew up with four similar brothers. He is both a mischievous and treacherous person, but he trusts in The Doraemons despite many of their bad scores in school. He often gives tasks to The Doraemons.

==== Noramyako ====
Voiced by: Yūko Minaguchi (March 1995), Ai Nonaka (September 2007)
Noramyako (ノラミャー子) is a female robotic cat who was one of Doraemon's friends in the Robot School. She was originally a character from the mainline Doraemon series, who is a former girlfriend of Doraemon that broke up with him because she continuously laughed at his lack of ears. In the spin-off series, she remains Doraemon's girlfriend but works as a proficient ballet dancer in the 22nd century. As with her mainline series counterpart, she initially made fun of Doraemon's earless look like in the main series with the same constant laughing, but later came back to see Doraemon while wearing a cast on her head due to her constant laughing at Doraemon earlier causing her jaws to disjoint. She then reconciles with Doraemon rather than breaking up like in the main series, admiring his new look.
Noramyako's depiction in the spin-off series is a stark contrast to her other appearances in the Doraemon series where she more or less resembled Doraemon (as well as his sister Dorami in her 2005 series incarnation) but in pink color. The spin-off series depicts her in a more humanoid body with cat-like features while retaining the pink skin color, which allowed her to perform the aerobic movements that fitted with her role as a ballet dancer in the spin-off series of which her other designs would not be able to do. This radically different design originated in the 1995 short film and was later carried over to the spin-off series, and would also be used in some capacity within the Doraemon series up until the debut of the 2005 anime series.

==== Dorapin ====
Voiced by: Akira Kamiya (1997)
Dorapin (ドラパン, Dorapan), also known as The Mysterious Thief Dorapin, is a mysterious cat-like robot thief from France, debuting in the 1997 short film. He is clearly modelled after Arsène Lupin. He has a wand with a jewel on it used to change the material of one object into another (e.g. paper -> water, rock -> china, etc.). He fears the dark and dogs. He likes eating dorayaki with cheese. Even though he was often misunderstood for a "villain", he always steals for a reason, especially to help the poor.
He made a non-speaking cameo appearance in the 1998 short film.

==== Jedora ====
Voiced by: Kōichi Yamadera (1999)
Jaidora (ジェドーラ, Jedōra) is a fantastic Italian cook from Italy, first appearing in the 1999 short film. He was one of Doraemon's friends in the Robot School. Strangely for his hobby, he wears glasses and cannot see without them. His emotions change quite rarely, and he runs in circles frantically when in panic.

==== Ed ====
Voiced by: Issei Futamata (1996, 1997)
Ed (エド, Edo-goe) is an American robot horse that serves as Dora-the-Kid's horse. Prior his acquisition by Kid, he works as a sheriff in the state of Texas. As a robot horse, he has wings which allows him to fly. He often gets annoyed with Kid, but is also very loyal to him.

==== Nobita Nobi ====
Nobita Nobi (野比 のび太, Nobi Nobita) is the co-protagonist of the main series, and is Doraemon's best friend. He occasionally appears in the original manga series, as well as the protagonist of The Doraemons Special series.

==== Dr. Achimoff ====
Voiced by: Banjō Ginga (1997, 2000)
Dr. Achimoff (アチモフ, Achimofu; Russian: Ачимов) is a German-Russian professor who is the major enemy of the Doraemons. He prominently appears in several anime short films as a major antagonist. As an evil doctor/scientist, he tries many different ways to conquer the world. In the 1997 short film (later adapted to manga format), he tried to steal the Doraemons' friendship cards, but fails. He also tries to steal an energy capsule from a power center in the 2000 short film and even sets up a soccer match between the Doraemons and his own team in the 2002 short film.

==== Jerry ====
Jerry is a mouse that hides his appearance under a hat and a scarf, who was once the major enemy of the Doraemons in the original manga series. If the Doraemons have any actions, Jerry would intervene them and not let them to successfully end the mission. He was eventually defeated by the Doraemons along with Dora Crybaby, Dora Eater, and Dradra Dora.

==== Daddy 13 ====
Voiced by: Goro Naya (1996)
Daddy 13 (ダディ13号, Dadi 13-gō) is the former guardian of the robot school the Doraemons attended, who was the antagonist of the 1996 short film Robot School's Seven Mysteries as well as one chapter in the manga. Residing in the refreshment room after Mommy 14 took over as school guardian, a sudden lightning strike caused by an accident with a weather satellite caused him to spiral out of control, and he brainwashes the old robots with a device that turns the robots into mindless zombies. Dorami and Dora-the-Kid take measures to save Doraemon and the others from him with help of five other Doreamons, and eventually defeating Daddy 13. With the problem solved, he was incorporated into the body of Mommy 14 (as his old one had been decimated by Kid's Air Gun), returning to protect the school again alongside Mommy 14.

==== Cursya ====
Cursya is the flat-dragon like entity that appeared after the events of the 1996 short film, created from a fragment of Daddy 13's evil electric waves. It possessed El Matadora and adsorbed many robots. It also tries to destroy the Doraemons, but fails. Eventually, El Matadora and others liberates from Cursya and was destroyed at the end.

==== Jafar ====
The Grand Vizier and senior advisor of the King of Saudi Arabia, Jafar is a quackery person and same to Ali, his love interest is Jasmine. He dislikes Ali and he has attempted to eliminate Ali anytime he wants. Eventually all these plans soon breaks down thanks for Dora-med III and the other members of The Doraemons.

==== Black Shark ====
Black Shark is a time criminal with expensive and modern technological advantage. He desires to take over from Pinocchio's reactive alloy, an invention of Mr. Geppetto, to manufacture weaponry for himself.

==== Water Bug Robots ====
Voiced by: Hikaru Midorikawa (leader), Tetsuya Iwanaga (members) (1998)
The Water Bug Robots (タガメロボ, Tagamerobo) are a group of three delinquent robots resembling giant water bugs, who were the antagonists of the 1998 short film The Great Operating of Springing Insects. They took Momo and her friends hostage, including Dora-nichov. They are defeated by several members of The Doraemons, including Dora-the-Kid, Wang Dora, El Matadora and Dora-rinho.

==== Bitter ====
Voiced by: Mitsuo Iwata (1999)
Bitter (ニガニガ, Niganiga) is Jaidora's rival, who is the antagonist of the 1999 short film Funny Candy of Okashinana. He tries many ways to cheat at the Okashinana Festival in the Okashinana Kingdom in order to disqualify the participants and win the grand prize for himself. He was defeated by The Doraemons and Jaidora's sweets, where he was banished from the kingdom and blasted into the river.

==== Princess Honey ====
Voiced by: Sakura Tange (1999)
Honey (ハニ, Hani) is a character that appears in the 1999 short film Funny Candy of Okashinana. She is the Princess of the Okashinana Kingdom, wearing a candy crown and having red-colored hair. She once lived a happy life with her parents, Sato and Suga, the King and Queen of the Kingdom respectively, making sweets for her parents. However, when the King and Queen got caught up in a heavy quarrel one day due to their personal preferences in sweets, the family split up, and as a result she doesn't smile anymore. During the Okashinana festival, her happiness (and indeed her smile) was restored by Wang Dora, El Matadora and Jaidora with a special dorayaki filled with cream, which she loves eating in her youth.

==== Carmen ====
Carmen is the Spanish counterpart of Shizuka from the main series. She is the daughter of a restaurant owner in Barcelona, which the restaurant is also named after her. She is the only person to know the real identity of El Matadora as Keikai Dora. She is a very good and kind-hearted, often helps El Matadora and his friends. She is the friend of Jaitonio.

==== Nobinho ====
Nobinho is the Brazilian counterpart of Nobita from the main series. Unlike Nobita, he is more athletic. He is the friend of Dora-rinho, whom he first met when Dora-rinho is still a student at the Robot School. Ever since their second meeting, they become true friends and despite Dora-rinho's forgetful situation, he always cares and never abandon Dora-rinho even in the toughest moment.

==== Mimimi ====
Voiced by: Rei Sakuma (1997)
Mimimi (ミミミ) is a character appearing in the 1997 short film The Puzzling Challenge Letter of the Mysterious Thief Dorapan. She is Dorapin's girlfriend. A very kind-hearted and good willing, she is the first to discover Dorapin, injured following his attempt to steal jewelry of the Duke of Monaco who is actually the culprit of an evil project. She is also the first to truly realize the real good nature of Dorapin. She has a robot pet dog, designed similarly to a German Shepherd. In the 1997 short film, she is imprisoned by Dr. Achimoff. It is her courage that helped Dorapin and The Doraemons to defeat the evil mindset of Achimoff. She later appears in several manga chapters alongside Dorapin.

==== Jaitonio ====
Jaitonio is the Spanish version of Gian from the main series, and is El Matadora's closest friend. He has a very bad voice of singing, and relatively strong; but unlike Gian, Jaitonio is a bit of a cowardice. His love interest is María, the neighboring girl and also friend of Carmen. He later confesses his love to María, having been assisted by The Doraemons to defeat the machine bull. Eventually they become a family and has children.

==== Rose DeWitt Bukater ====
Rose DeWitt Bukater is a girl based on a character of the same name from the iconic 1997 Titanic film. She appears in a special chapter titled Titanic the Ghost Ship. Similar to her movie counterpart, she plans to commit suicide, but was interrupted by Dora-the-Kid, who appears as Jack Dawson, a character also appearing in the 1997 movie. She soon develops a crush on Kid and together with Doraemons, they discover that the ancient demon, Satan, has taken control of the ship and moving the time into their way. With the help of Kid, she is saved and later breaks the Satan's curse, however the ship had started to sink and when she plans to escape, she is taken by Satan and falls into the sea. In the later part of the manga, her granddaughter plays the old violin that reminded Kid of the tune where he finally realizes that Rose has survived and lived up to old age.

==== Momo ====
Voiced by: Tomoko Kawakami (1998)
Momo (モモ) is a character appearing in the 1998 short film The Great Operating of Springing Insects. A fellow classmate of The Doraemons, She is initially a bit arrogant, but is rescued by Dora-nichov following an incident. She develops a crush on Dora-nichov since.

==== Jasmine ====
A daughter of Saudi King, she is quite depicted to be freer in contrast to heavily tightened Sharia law in Saudi Arabia, and somehow liberal on talking and thinking. She is quite too cautious over Ali, but eventually confesses her feeling to him.

==== Mimiko ====
Mimiko is a female robotic cat nurse who is the girlfriend of Wang Dora. She is a very tough and determined girl, and is also the only person that can scare Wang Dora, due to his pet-peeve of girls. Nonetheless, she truly cares for Wang Dora, and hinders that she has feelings for him.

==== Nina ====
Nina is a character based on the Russian singer Alsou. She is a poor girl founded in the bridge at the city of Saint Petersburg. Because she is an orphan, she only has a dog to befriend with until gets harassed by a group of gangster. She has one of the best singing voice. It was Dora-nichov, disguised as St. Petersburg's Mayor son, Nikolai Ivanov, who founded her talents, run up to protect her from the gang and encourages her to become a top-choice singer in a singing contest in the city. Eventually, Nichov and Nina find themselves each other again, and Nichov remains very supportive for Nina regardless of any consequences. It is hinted that Nina has feeling on him. Her opening song heavily resembled Winter dream, Alsou's first song in her career.

==== Ali ====
Ali is a rich person and the boss of Dora-med III. In spite of being the boss, Ali treats Dora-med III like a friend instead and has never considered himself like a boss to Dora-med III, even Dora-med III has utmost respects for him. His love interests in Jasmine, the daughter of Saudi King. With the assist of Dora-med III, he overcomes troubles to finally gets the love he deserves.

==== Robin ====
Voiced by: Yuri Shiratori (2000)
Robin (ロビン) is a character that appears in the 2000 anime movie Doki Doki Wildcat Engine. She is the grand daughter of a train designer and cleaner, and it is her grandpa who inspired her to become a train driver. She holds the real capsule when Dr. Achimoff attempts to take the capsule that has the viral electricity that can manage to functions and lightens everything that has been destroyed by Achimoff. She later develops a crush on Kid, and she shows deep grateful for Kid because of his action to defend her.

==== Dora Leonardo da Vinci ====
Dora Leonardo da Vinci is an old artist named after Leonardo da Vinci. He follows the instructor of Principle Teraodai when The Doraemons is taking a holiday trip, and when they are kidnapped by an UFO, Da Vinci shows up and rescues them. He has a magical pen which can help him paint everything to real.

==== Cleopatra ====
Cleopatra is a character from Ancient Egypt. Her love interest is Mark Antony, an ancient Greek warrior who is later caught injured by The Doraemons themselves. In exchange, Nobita is forced to act as Antony in order to prevent an ongoing war between Egypt and Roman Empire, but they [The Doraemons] soon discover that Cleopatria in fact, is an alien woman who sought refuge in Egypt, and Egyptian coffins are in fact, a machine bed that can guarantee them to stay long like a death one. Nonetheless, Cleopatra always loves Antony, which Nobita has finally helped achieving it.

==== Spica ====
Spica is the Empress of the Mirage Kingdom, a mysterious Uyghur Kingdom that has disappeared thousand years ago in Taklamakan Desert. Depicted as an Empress, she first believes on what a mysterious "Authority" to sacrifice Nobita, until Nobita is rescued. Upon what happened, The Doraemons discover a dark secret that the Mirage Kingdom has, in fact, achieved a high level of technological science that cannot be seen anywhere in the ancient world, and the so-called "Authority" in fact was a scientist who created the nuclear reactor (which is called as "Black Magic" by Spica), but was killed following the explosion and effectively disappeared whole Kingdom. After successful disable a lot of problem, Spica is unable to return to the modern world, because she and the Kingdom have stayed out from the line for thousand years. She decides to stay in the Kingdom. Throughout the story, Dora-med III cares for her the most, and has been deeply shocked by the fact that she cannot return.

==== Raúl and Riril ====
Raúl and Riril are brothers and sisters from a traditional Aztec family working as guardians protecting the masks in a Mexican pyramid when Dora-nichov is founded to have been affected by the warrior mask. Eventually, Raúl also gets affected but in an even more dangerous due to a mistake from Nobita, and he almost kills all of them until Riril wears the Queen's mask, successfully disables the warrior mask.

==== Mr. Geppetto ====
Mr. Geppetto is an inventor who is instrumental to the development of the robotic cat. For all seven members of The Doraemons, he is accredited for manufacturing them. He holds the reactive alloy, one of his specific invention which can be used to make everything longer automatically, if someone is lying. Because of this, Black Shark is determined to take away his invention. He also manufactures Pinocchio, with his son's human brain, while he is trying to cure the cancer for his son which will later end up successful.

==== Pinocchio ====
Pinocchio is a robotic puppet based on the character of the same name. A robot himself, however, he keeps a secret that a time criminal, Black Shark, is seeking, the reactive alloy of Mr. Geppetto, on his nose. Although he is a robot, his brain is belonged to Geppetto's son. He is injured following an attempt to protect The Doraemons, but is later saved.

==== Carlo Collodi ====
Carlo Collodi is a boy who lives in 19th century Florence. When The Doraemons first meet him, he is totally not aware, but after The Doraemons' attention to seek Mr. Geppetto and Pinocchio, he is the first to know. In fact, he has kept a secret relations with both of them, until he discovers The Doraemons and Mr. Geppetto have a close relations. He follows both of them later, in the counter against Black Shark, and even visits Pinocchio being hospitalized. Because of this experience, he becomes inspired and will mark his path to become one of Italy's greatest authors in the history, writing The Adventures of Pinocchio, which Wang Dora later discovers out. He later participates in the Italian unification.

==== Pino ====
Voiced by: Omi Minami (2001)
Pino (ピノ) is a male robotic dog that appears in the 2001 short film Space Land's Critical Event. He is a security guard protecting peace in Space Land, and has a coward personality. He was the first to encounter the viruses within Space Land when they were initially harmless. When the viruses suddenly started to spread around Space Land causing many of the security guards (which are based on the same dog-like robots similar to Pino) to become outnumbered by the viruses in an attempt to stop them, he became scared that he would also become outnumbered by the viruses too. When Dora-rinho and Dorami found him, he helped the two of them (as well as the rest of The Doraemons) to stop the spread of the viruses in Space Land once and for all.

== Media ==
=== Manga ===
Three versions of The Doraemons manga were released from 1995 to 2003.

==== Original ====
The Doraemons (main): The original main series of The Doraemons, created by Michiaki Tanaka (田中 道明, Tanaka Michiaki), who was also the character and story designer of the 1995 3DO game. It follows on the life and adventures of the Doraemons, with some chapters adapting the short film anime stories. It ran from December 1995 to March 2001 with six volumes.

==== Special ====
The Doraemons Special (ザ☆ドラえもんズ スペシャル, Za Doraemonzu Supesharu): A spin-off of The Doraemons manga series, written by Masaru Miyazaki and illustrated by Yukihiro Mitani. It has a similar premise to the original The Doraemons, albeit with a much darker, more serious and dramatic tone. This action-oriented spin-off focuses on Nobita Nobi's adventures with the Doraemons, and involves many fictional (such as Arsene Lupin, Pinocchio, etc...) and real-life historical figures (Cleopatra, Nostradamus, etc...), as well as events that have happened in real life. This series ran from December 1996 to September 2002 with twelve volumes released.

==== Robot School Memories ====
The Doraemons Special: Robot Training School: A spin-off of The Doraemons manga series created by Yukihiro Mitani, focusing on The Doraemons' past journeys in the Robot School. It is part of The Doraemons Special spin-off series, and ran from May 1999 to January 2003 with three volumes.

=== Anime ===
The Doraemons characters first made their debut in animated form in the 1995 short film 2112: The Birth of Doraemon. From 1996 to 2002, The Doraemons characters appeared in several short films released alongside the mainline theatrical feature films, with two short films, Dorami & Doraemons: Robot School's Seven Mysteries!? (1996) and Dorami & Doraemons: Space Land's Critical Event! (2001), starring Doraemon's sister Dorami alongside the Doraemons, released for the subseries.

=== Video game ===
The Doraemons characters from the 1995 short film have also appeared in the 1995 Japan-only Doraemon video game Doraemon Yūjō Densetsu (ドラえもん友情伝説, Doraemon Friendship Legends) for the 3DO, which was released a month after the short film on April 7, 1995.

== See also ==
- Doraemon
