= Doraemon: Nobita and the Spiral City =

1997 film by Tsutomu Shibayama

Doraemon the Movie: Nobita and the Spiral City
- Theatrical release poster
- Directed by: Tsutomu Shibayama
- Screenplay by: Fujiko F. Fujio
- Based on: Doraemon's Long Tales: Noby's Wind-up City by Fujiko F. Fujio
- Starring: Nobuyo Ōyama; Noriko Ohara; Michiko Nomura; Kaneta Kimotsuki; Kazuya Tatekabe; Nozomu Sasaki; Sumiko Shirakawa; Masashi Sugawara; Kaneto Shiozawa; Keiko Yokozawa
- Music by: Shunsuke Kikuchi
- Production company: Shin-Ei Animation
- Distributed by: Toho
- Release date: 8 March 1997
- Running time: 99 minutes
- Country: Japan
- Language: Japanese
- Box office: $31.2 million

Doraemon: Nobita and the Spiral City (ドラえもん のび太のねじ巻き都市(シティー)冒険記, Doraemon Nobita no Nejimaki Shitī Bōkenki), also known as Doraemon and the Spiral City, is a 1997 Japanese animated science fiction adventure film.

It premiered in Japan on March 8th, 1997, and was based on the 17th volume of the same name in the Doraemon Long Stories manga series. The film's release commemorated the 20th anniversary of the launch of the Corocoro Comic magazine. It is the 18th animated feature-length Doraemon film.

It was the last Doraemon film written and supervised by series creator Fujiko F. Fujio before he died in September 1996, the remainder of the manga being completed and released in serialization by apprentices (he died while inking and illustrating the manga) with the film released months after his death.

== Plot ==
The film opens with Nobita playing with a toy horse in the empty lot then cuts to Suneo boasting about his private ground to his friends. Fed up, Nobita says that he will show his own ranch to them. When Doraemon refuses to help, Nobita tries to find a way and discovers that Doraemon has won several lotteries that award "planets", though all of them are nothing more than asteroids.

When his friends come, Nobita shouts out the last ticket he had, but to his surprise they arrive at a habitable and lush planet. Using a clockwork screw, they bring life to several toys and go on to build a toy town. Doraemon also builds an Egg Factory which gives birth living toys through toy eggs and a Photocopy Mirror. While capturing several satellite photos, they notice a shining substance inside a crater. Nobita and his friends attempt to travel to the crater, but are hindered by a storm that wash them up to the shore.

Returning to the city, they discover that the lightning-struck Egg Factory had produced toys that have human-like intelligence. Meanwhile, an escaped convict, Onigoro Kumatora, slips into Nobita's house and enters the planet. When Nobita and his friends are distracted, Onigoro steals their city map, accidentally makes copies of himself in the Egg Factory and travels to the crater with them.

Nobita and his friends continue to run the toy city and are surprised by another storm which gives life to more intelligent toys. Still curious about the planet, they planned to use an enlarged Suneo's toy rocket to explore it from space. Meanwhile, Onigoro and his copies arrive at the crater, but find that it is not gold as they presumed, but instead a giant shape-shifting monster that attacks them. They escape and hide near Suneo's rocket, then chase after the main characters once they return

Getting cornered near a chasm, they attempt to cross on a ladder, Shizuka's skirt gets snagged on said ladder. When Nobita tries to save her, his hand slips and he falls inside the chasm and lands on a bush though not known to anyone, rendered unconscious. As the monster rampages again, the remaining group and Onigoro's group escape using Suneo's rocket, but realize that it cannot fly for long as it is only a toy, thus Onigoro and his copies lay explosives to escape while leaving the others for dead, though they manage to escape before the explosion.

Meanwhile, Nobita awakes and meets with the "Seed Sower", an ancient shape-shifter being who is the true identity of the monster. He explains that he had tried multiple times to give life on planets, including Earth and Mars, eventually settling the toy planet as his choice. While at first he tries to stop humans from entering the planet and reveals them entering him was a mistake entirely, he eventually chooses to give the responsibility of it in the humans' hands, before going away. With the help of the plants, Nobita escapes from the chasm and regroups with the others.

Learning that Onigoro has taken control of the toy city, Nobita and his friends plan an attack to reclaim the city. They manage to drive Onigoro and his copies off the city, but they plan to attack them the next day. However, Nobita and his friends enlist the help of the toys, and with them they capture Onigoro and his copies and merge them back into one, when he comes out it turns out to be the mole-faced Onigoro who is the least hostile of them, planning to turn himself in.

The film ends with Nobita and his friends giving the responsibility of the planet to the living toys before heading back to Earth.

== Cast ==
Character	Japanese voice actor
Doraemon	Nobuyo Ōyama
Nobita Nobi	Noriko Ohara
Shizuka Minamoto	Michiko Nomura
Suneo Honekawa	Kaneta Kimotsuki
Takeshi "Gian" Gōda	Kazuya Tatekabe
Tamako Nobi	Sachiko Chijimatsu
Nobisuke Nobi	Yōsuke Naka
Pibu	Nozomu Sasaki
Pupi	Sumiko Shirakawa
Ain Motain	Masashi Sugawara
Thomas Meedison	Kaneto Shiozawa
Wookey	Keiko Yokozawa
Panda	Kazuyo Aoki
Thira	Chafurin
Majin	Takeshi Watabe
Boy figure	Kazue Ikura
Onigoro Kumatora	Kenji Utsumi
Mole	Ginzo Matsuo

== Release ==
The film was released theatrically in Japan on March 8th, 1997, on a double billing with The Doraemons short film, The Doraemons: The Puzzling Challenge Letter of the Mysterious Thief Dorapin! (ザ☆ドラえもんズ 怪盗ドラパン謎の挑戦状!).

Years later, it premiered in India on the Disney Channel under the title Doraemon the Movie: Nobita In Gol Gol Golmaal on July 25th, 2020.

== See also ==
- List of Doraemon films
