= The Doraemons: The Puzzling Challenge Letter of the Mysterious Thief Dorapin! =

1997 film by Yoshitomo Yonetani

- Theatrical release poster
- Kanji: ザ☆ドラえもんズ 怪盗ドラパン謎の挑戦状!
- Revised Hepburn: Za Doraemonzu: Kaitō Dorapan Nazo no Chōsenjō!
- Directed by: Yoshitomo Yonetani
- Screenplay by: Kenji Terada
- Based on: Doraemon by Fujiko F. Fujio
- Produced by: Sojiro Masuko; Jun'ichi Kimura; Atsushi Kaji
- Starring: Masaharu Satō; Mie Suzuki; Akira Kamiya; Rei Sakuma; Banjō Ginga; Nobuyo Ōyama
- Edited by: Hajime Okayasu
- Music by: Shinji Miyazaki; Shirō Hamaguchi
- Production company: Shin-Ei Animation
- Distributed by: Toho
- Release date: March 8, 1997 (Japan)
- Running time: 31 minutes
- Country: Japan
- Language: Japanese
- Box office: $31.2 million

The Doraemons: The Puzzling Challenge Letter of the Mysterious Thief Dorapin! (ザ☆ドラえもんズ 怪盗ドラパン謎の挑戦状!, Za Doraemonzu: Kaitō Dorapan Nazo no Chōsenjō!) is a 1997 Japanese animated science fiction comedy-drama short film.

It premiered in Japan on March 8, 1997 on a double feature with Doraemon: Nobita and the Spiral City. It is the first Doraemons short film to star the titular characters.

The short received the Excellent Silver Prize Award in the 15th Golden Gross Award the same year alongside Doraemon: Nobita and the Spiral City.

The film's tagline is "I've taken the power of your friendship!" (君達の友情パワーはもらったぞ!).

== Plot ==
At Saudi Arabia, Dora-rinho runs to alert Dora-med III about an emergency. Forgetting the details, Dora-rinho recalls the message: Principal Teraodai needs help against the French gentleman thief robot cat Dorapin, wanted worldwide. Panicked, they decide to assist Teraodai. Dora-med III checks his tarot cards, which predict a bad outcome, but Dora-rinho reassures him and rushes out, tripping before leaving. Dora-med III, still uncertain, uses his flying magic carpet to depart.

Dora-med III and Dora-rinho fly to Teraodai's sky laboratory above the sky of Paris, almost losing Dora-rinho at one point. They join up with their teammates Dora-the-Kid, El Matadora, Wang Dora, Dora-nichov, and their leader Doraemon. At the lab, "Teraodai", hiding from Dorapin, reveals Dorapin's trap to steal their Bestfriend Telecards. Dora-the-Kid finds out that "Teraodai" is really Dorapin in disguise and fires at him using the Air Cannon he had received from Dorami. (Note: The new Air Cannon was replaced by his old one that was destroyed in Dorami & Doraemons: Robot School's Seven Mysteries!?. (1996)) Dorapin mocks them and activates a supermagnetic force, disabling their gadgets. The Doraemons use their Bestfriend Telecards, temporarily blinding Dorapin, but he quickly transforms them into frozen gold statues.

Dora-med III and Dora-rinho wake up in a dark void. Dora-rinho wonders where they are, and Dora-med III reveals they've become gold statues. He accidentally pulls a tarot card instead of his Bestfriend Telecard. Dora-rinho also has a plain yellow card. Duplicates of both appear, and the Dora-rinho duplicates suggest that the real Dora-rinho has the Bestfriend Telecard. Dora-med III tries to pull out his Bestfriend Telecard but gets a Hanging Man tarot card instead, revealing one Dora-med III upside down. Dora-med III warns Dora-rinho against using his Bestfriend Telecard, but duplicates urge him to do so. Eventually, Dora-rinho concludes the hanging Dora-med III is actually Dorapin in disguise. He kicks a soccer ball at Dorapin, exposing him and creating a hole in the wall. Dorapin makes all duplicates disappear, revealing his moustache can create duplicates before flying away. Dora-rinho attempts to chase but trips and falls.

Meanwhile in the core of the laboratory, where the frozen gold statues of the Doraemons are arranged as Dorapin considers how to capture Dora-med III and Dora-rinho for their Bestfriend Telecards. A shadowy figure presses Dorapin for results, which he promises to deliver soon. Dora-med III senses Dorapin's malicious intent and uses his tarot cards, drawing a Tower card. He decides to reach the center tower, but their magic carpet fails due to gadget restrictions, causing them to fall. They then navigate the lab's maze to continue their journey. Dorapin watches from a nearby rooftop, aware of Dora-med III's aquaphobia and Dora-rinho's forgetfulness. Dorapin manipulates water to chase Dora-med III and Dora-rinho in a maze. Dora-med III gets cornered, but Dora-rinho rescues him by jumping over the water. More water forces them to crash into a wall, with Dora-med III left on dry land. Out of love, he dives back in to save sinking Dora-rinho. Despite his weakness, Dora-rinho regains consciousness, pulls Dora-med III up, and they reach the center tower’s entrance, where Dora-rinho dashes up the stairs inside effortlessly.

Dora-rinho enters a pink field and meets a blonde girl who recognizes him from earlier. She introduces herself as Mimimi and explains she's held hostage by an evil man. Dora-rinho suspects Dorapin is responsible but is told he's actually good and trying to save her. Mimimi reveals she can't leave due to a collar and asks Dora-rinho to believe in Dorapin, who helps the poor despite being a thief. She cries, citing his past kindness. Dora-rinho hears a cry from a suddenly appearing Dorapin, who disguises as Doraemon to tricks Dora-rinho, warns that everyone will die if he doesn't use his Bestfriend Telecard then and there. Believing Mimimi about Dorapin, he uses the card, but Dorapin transforms him into a gold statue instead. Dorapin comments on Dora-rinho's forgetfulness, while Mimimi insists he knew it was a disguise. Enraged, Dora-med III grows giant and chases after Dorapin, who flies away with the statue. Dora-med III causes destruction but is stopped when he steps into a lake and shrinks back to normal, sinking underwater.

Dora-rinho is placed with other gold statue Doraemons by Dorapin, who promises Mimimi to restore them later, valuing their innocence and bravery. Meanwhile, underwater, Dora-med III, using his Bestfriend Telecard, hears his friends' voices, motivating him to grow giant again and confront Dorapin. Before he can destroy the laboratory, a shadowy figure warns him to stop and that it took years to develop. The shadowy figure is identified as the Russian mad scientist named Dr. Achimoff, who plans to control all robots using the energy of the sky laboratory, later revealed to be the flying machine called the Achimoff Machine. Dora-med III intends to destroy the machine, but Achimoff orders Dorapin to stop him, threatening Mimimi's life as leverage. Dorapin confronts Dora-med III, who consults tarot cards, drawing a Justice card and affirming trust. Dorapin then uses his Statue Stake to transform Dora-med III into a gold statue in mercy, and Achimoff congratulates him on obtaining all the Bestfriend Telecards.

With the last Bestfriend Telecard, Dorapin demands Achimoff release Mimimi, but Achimoff instead shocks him and reveals his intent to control Dorapin. Dorapin, believing in justice, plans to transform Achimoff into a gold statue. He uses the Justice card to remove Achimoff's golden tooth, freeing Mimimi from his control. Achimoff escapes, and Dorapin frees the Doraemons with the Statue Stake. Dorapin and Dora-med III reunite, with Dora-med III affirming his trust in Dorapin, who credits the Justice tarot card. Mimimi is relieved that Dora-rinho is safe, though he is confused. Achimoff expels everyone into space, transforming the Achimoff Machine into a mecha called the Achimoff Robot. The group, riding on Ed, worries about how to fight without their gadgets. Dorapin explains his hat protects against electromagnetic waves and allows him to use his gadgets. Dora-the-Kid urges Dorapin to escape with Mimimi while he and his team confront Achimoff.

However, they realize they need to fuse to use their gadgets effectively. The Doraemons and Dorapin unite to confront Achimoff, who possesses the Bestfriend Telecards and claims the Achimoff Robot is unbeatable. The mecha attacks, but Doraemon uses a Pass Loop to evade it, while Dora-the-Kid blasts off a portion of its hand with his Air Cannon. El Matadora deflects a drill attack, damaging the mecha's chest. Dora-nichov melts another hand with fire, and Wang Dora strikes the mecha's head. Dora-med III attempts to dismantle it, but Achimoff spins the robot to threaten them. Luckily, Dora-Rinho's Mini-Doras retrieve the Telecards, enabling the team to destroy the Achimoff Robot.

The Doraemons, Mimimi and Dorapin return to Earth in Paris via Doraemon's Anywhere Door, trampling him upon entry, while the robot police arrest Achimoff for crimes against humanity. While the group celebrates, Dorapin escapes arrest from the Time Patrol, holding the Justice card and vows to never forget the Doraemons.

== Cast ==
Character	Japanese voice actor
Dora-med III	Masaharu Satō
Dora-rinho	Mie Suzuki
Dorapin	Akira Kamiya
"Principal Teraodai"	Ichirō Nagai
Mimimi	Rei Sakuma
Dr. Achimoff	Banjō Ginga
Doraemon	Nobuyo Ōyama
Dora-the-Kid	Keiichi Nanba
El Matadora	Ryūsei Nakao
Wang Dora	Megumi Hayashibara
Dora-nichov	Toshiharu Sakurai
Mini-Doras	Rei Sakuma

== Soundtrack ==
=== Theme song ===
"Because We Are Friends '97" (友達だから'97)
Lyrics: Tetsuya Takeda / Composition: Yasuyo Yamaki / Arrangement: Masae Sagara / Vocals: Satoko Yamano, Morinoki Children Choir

== Release ==
The short film was released theatrically in Japan on a double feature with Doraemon: Nobita and the Spiral City on March 8, 1997.

=== Television broadcasts ===
In 2011, to commemorate the theatrical release of Doraemon: Nobita and the New Steel Troops ~Winged Angels~, a 24 hour marathon of Doraemon short films and specials including The Puzzling Challenge Letter of the Mysterious Thief Dorapin! and the original Doraemon: Nobita and the Steel Troops aired on TV Asahi's CS TV Asahi Channel starting February 26.

== Awards ==
Award	Year	Category	Recipient	Result	Ref.
15th Golden Gross Award	1997	Excellent Silver Award	Doraemon: Nobita and the Spiral City; The Doraemons: The Puzzling Challenge Letter of the Mysterious Thief Dorapin!	Won	
