= The Doraemons (video game) =

1995 video game

- Cover art for the demo version
- Developer: Riverhillsoft
- Publisher: Shogakukan
- Designer: Michiaki Tanaka
- Programmer: Akihiro Hino
- Writer: Kenji Terada
- Series: Doraemon; The Doraemons
- Platform: 3DO
- Release: JP: April 7, 1995
- Genre: Role-playing
- Mode: Single-player

The Doraemons (Note: Japanese: ザ☆ドラえもんズ, Hepburn: Za Doraemonzu), also known as Doraemon Friendship Legends, (Note: Japanese: ドラえもん友情伝説, Hepburn: Doraemon: Yūjō Densetsu; Literal translation of the original Japanese title) is a 1995 role-playing video game developed by Riverhillsoft and published by Shogakukan for the 3DO. Released exclusively in Japan on April 7, 1995, it is based on the Doraemon manga series (and to a lesser extent, its The Doraemons spin-off).

The game was notable for including the six additional characters that were introduced in the 1995 short film 2112: The Birth of Doraemon, which were six Doraemon-like characters collectively known as The Doraemons. To date, it is the only game based on the Doraemon series to feature these characters.

== Gameplay ==
The Doraemons is a role-playing video game, with its gameplay being made up of three parts: an overworld, a world map, and a battle screen. In the overworld, the player can navigate the protagonists through different places, and can interact with other characters and objects. The player can also pick up items in several areas, which can be acquired for use in battle. Unlike most role-playing games, the overworld is displayed as a side-scroller rather than an overhead top-down perspective or isometric viewpoint, with some locations being displayed as static, single-screened areas. In the world map, the player can access several locations within each world. This would take the player into a specific location upon reaching them. These include towns, fields, and even places such as dungeon-like areas.

At specific points in the story, a battle sequence would begin, where the standard combat system with some real-time elements comes into play. The combat system involves gadgets and items from the Doraemon series, along with the option to attack using Nobita. Seven slots are available, with six of them being used for gadgets which can be utilized in battle and have a limited number of uses depending on how many items are placed in each slot. The last slot is a special power slot reserved for Nobita, where he can use his abilities to attack enemies and can be used an unlimited number of times. Hit points (HP) are determined by a green bar that increases capacity during gameplay. The Action Meter is denoted by a small triangular arrow, which moves from left to right during an attack. The duration and speed of the meter varies depending on the gadget and/or ability being used. During each battle, both the player and the enemies can attack and use their abilities at any point in real-time. The player can also defend during battle, which has an effect on physical-based attacks, but not magic and/or special attacks. If the player's hit points are depleted, the battle is lost and the player is instructed to either restart the battle or continue from the last save point. There are also three treasure chests located at the bottom of the area after the player is defeated, with one of them randomly containing an item stored within it.

Outside of battle sequences, the player can access all the items they have via a menu interface, which also includes some key items acquired during the story. Items acquired in the overworld can be moved into each of the six slots at the top to be used later in battle. The game also allows the player to save their progress on the world map, with up to three slots per save.

As the game was targeted for children, several elements have been simplified to allow for easier accessibility. For instance, the menu interfaces are designed in a way to allow for children to easily access all of the items and gadgets acquired in the game.

== Plot ==
In September 2112, a set of robotic cats were being manufactured at a robot cat factory, with Doraemon being one of the many robotic cats built there. The robotic cats were then set out to the Robot School to learn how to assist people in various situations, and Doraemon is no exception. While there, Doraemon met up with six other robotic cats like him that would later become best friends, swearing their friendship with each other. Before long, they became known as Dora Dora Seven (DD7), later to be called "The Doraemons".

In the present, Doraemon wanted to get in touch with his friends again after a long time since graduating from the Robot School, where he provides Nobita Nobi with a special gadget known as the Friendship Card (also called the Friendship Telecard), a gadget in the form of a telephone card that allows one to call out their friends in need when they think of them. Using the card, Doraemon tries to call out two of his six friends, Dora-the-Kid and Wang Dora, but there was no answer. Just when he was starting to get worried about his friends, Dorami suddenly comes out from Nobita's desk to deliver the news: six of the seven members of Dora Dora Seven have gone rogue and attacked the factory where the robotic cats were manufactured, that disappeared elsewhere and took several other robotic cats with them.

Wondering about what happened to the future and his best friends, Doraemon and Nobita set out on an adventure to regain trust with the members of Dora Dora Seven. Once all of the members are reunited, a mysterious fortress containing an equally mysterious figure lurks upon them, hinting at the real cause on who was behind Dora Dora Seven's actions.

== Development and release ==
The Doraemons was developed by Japanese studio Riverhillsoft and was supervised by Doraemon series creator Fujiko F. Fujio. It was created after the release of the 1995 short film 2112: The Birth of Doraemon, which featured six characters based on Doraemon with their own unique personalities, abilities and nationalities colloquially known as The Doraemons, also called Dora Dora Seven within the game. The voice cast includes those of the long-running 1979 series and the aforementioned short film, along with some new ones. A selection of music featured in the game was taken from a 1994 Doraemon musical entitled Doraemon Musical: Nobita's Dinosaur. A demo version of The Doraemons was released prior to the game's release, which contained some differences from the final version. The game was officially released in Japan on April 7, 1995, about one month after the 1995 short film's release.

== Reception and legacy ==
Reception

Review score
Publication	Score
Next Generation	1/5

Due to its target audience and obscurity, The Doraemons received mediocre reviews from critics. Next Generation gave it one star out of five in their review of the game, with the staff stating that "if you're more than seven or eight years old, the game is generally uninvolving."

Michiaki Tanaka, who was the story and character designer, created a manga adaptation of the game two weeks after its release on April 20, 1995, serving as a strategy guide along with some additional extras. He would then later create a manga series based on the six Doraemon-like characters featured in the game (as well as the 1995 short film, where they first appeared), which were released in six tankōbon volumes from December 16, 1995 to March 28, 2001. An adaptation of the game's events was also featured in the manga series. The six characters that were introduced in this game and the 1995 short film would also appear on several Doraemon short films released between 1996 and 2002 alongside the mainline feature films.
