= Doraemon: Nobita and the Winged Braves =

2001 film by Tsutomu Shibayama

Doraemon the Movie: Nobita and the Winged Braves
- Theatrical release poster
- Directed by: Tsutomu Shibayama
- Screenplay by: Kazuaki Imai
- Based on: Doraemon by Fujiko F. Fujio
- Produced by: Hideki Yamakawa; Kumi Ogura; Masatoshi Osawa; Yuka Takahashi
- Starring: Nobuyo Ōyama; Noriko Ohara; Michiko Nomura; Kaneta Kimotsuki; Kazuya Tatekabe
- Cinematography: Toshiyuki Umeda
- Edited by: Hajime Okayasu
- Music by: Katsumi Horii
- Production company: Shin-Ei Animation
- Distributed by: Toho
- Release date: March 10, 2001 (Japan)
- Running time: 91 minutes
- Country: Japan
- Language: Japanese
- Box office: $30.7 million

Doraemon: Nobita and the Winged Braves (ドラえもん のび太と翼の勇者たち, Doraemon Nobita to Tsubasa no Yūsha-tachi), also known as Doraemon and the Winged Warriors, is a 2001 Japanese animated science fiction adventure film.

It premiered in Japan on 10 March 2001 on a triple feature with Dorami & Doraemons: Space Land's Critical Event! and Good Luck! Gian!!.

Based on the Doraemon manga series by Fujiko F. Fujio, it is the 22nd Doraemon film.

== Plot ==
The film starts with Dekisugi, Gian, Nobita and Shizuka watching a televised broadcast about a herd of flamingos mysteriously disappearing, Nobita after seeing this, dreams of being able to fly with wings. He builds wooden wings after Doraemon refuses to help him, though he repeatedly fails to fly using them. While trying to help Shizuka to reclaim her pet canary, they witness a portal opens in the sky and a humanoid bird riding an airplane coming out.

He introduces himself as Gusuke, a humanoid bird who lives in Birdopia. Doraemon, Nobita, and Shizuka help Gusuke fix his airplane, they quickly became friends with him. As Gusuke departs to his home, Gian and Suneo catch him and grab his plane. The other three follow them through the portal.

Arriving at Birdopia, Gian and Suneo are captured by crow soldiers and brought to the vulture Commander Seagrid, who plans to execute them. Meanwhile, Doraemon, Nobita, and Shizuka find Gusuke near the owl Professor Hou's house after fleeing from the same crow soldiers with the help of an ostrich taxi service. Hou explains that Birdopia is a world existing far away from human world and is connected only during bird migration, which is guarded by Bird Migration Patrol Troops. Seagrid was once a member of the troops, but he was shot by humans and had to retire early and is now seeking vengeance against them.

Hou advises them to take cover as most despise humans in Birdopia, Doraemon brings "Bird Hats" which can sprout wings by wearing them, with him as a pigeon, Nobita a duck, and Shizuka a swan. The three and Gusuke manage to stage a rescue of Gian and Suneo shortly thereafter, and Doraemon gives them Bird Hats of an albatross and a woodpecker respectively.

Gusuke informs Nobita and his friends that there will be an annual competition, "Rally Icarus", which is used to recruit members for the Patrol Troops, and that they should join it. During a dinner with Gusuke's parents and his friend, Milk, Gusuke confesses that he is actually adopted and that he is unable to fly naturally due to his trauma from falling right before being found by his adopted mother. Meanwhile, Hou deciphers an ancient tablet which contains information about Phoenicia, an ancient dragon-like being who can destroy the world. The captain of the crow soldiers reports to Seagrid after overhearing it, after which Seagrid kidnaps Hou for the location of Phoenicia so he can use it to destroy humanity.

During the "Rally Icarus", Gusuke manages to win but gets disqualified when Seagrid's falcon lieutenant Babylon, by Seagrid's orders, says that people who use machines to fly are disqualified. The group later realize that Hou is missing and after Doraemon learns about Phoenicia by reading the tablet using Translator Jelly, go to search for Icarus, a legendary eagle who was imprisoned in the Birdopia prison after being falsely accused of letting Seagrid get shot.

They manage to convince him to stop Seagrid from awakening Phoenicia, who is buried at an icy mountain. Along the way, they find a projector which projects a hologram of Mamoru Torino, a 23rd-century Ornithologist who is obsessed in creating a safe haven for birds, which eventually led to the creation of Birdopia. However, the group is too late to stop Seagrid as he successfully awakens Phoenicia. Doraemon attempts to de-evolve Phoenicia into an amoeba using his Transgression Beam, but he gets into a struggle with Babylon, which causes the beam to instead evolve the creature into a bigger, stronger version.

The creature does not follow Seagrid's bidding and nearly kills him in the process before being saved by Icarus. Phoenicia then goes on a rampage in Birdopia. During the battle, Gusuke awakes his ability to fly after Icarus (who is revealed to be his father to the viewer only) gives him to courage to do so and manages to lure Phoenicia to the top of the Perched Tree, while Doraemon and Nobita travel to the top of the tree where Mamoru's time machine is located, intending to knock out Phoenicia. When it does not work, Doraemon instead transports both the machine and Phoenicia back to billions of years in the past to the Pre-Hadean Era.

After the destruction caused by Phoenicia is fixed, the main characters and Birdopia all celebrate together. The film ends with Nobita and his friends bidding farewell to everyone in Birdopia before returning to their home world with Shizuka also bringing back her pet canary.

== Cast ==
Character	Japanese voice actor
Doraemon	Nobuyo Ōyama
Nobita Nobi	Noriko Ohara
Shizuka Minamoto	Michiko Nomura
Takeshi "Gian" Gōda	Kazuya Tatekabe
Suneo Honekawa	Kaneta Kimotsuki
Gusuke	Kyōko Tongū
Professor Hou	Ichirō Nagai
Milk	Kyōko Hikami
Gusuke's adoptive father	Bin Shimada
Gusuke's adoptive mother	Ai Orikasa
Gusuke's adoptive brother	Yōko Teppōzuka
Tsubakuro	Rina Chinen
Tobio	Kappei Yamaguchi
Seagrid	Tōru Ōhira
Babylon	Yasunori Matsumoto
Crows	Masashi Hirose; Daisuke Gouri
Icarus	Masane Tsukayama
Ootaka	Jōji Yanami
Professor Torino	Hisaya Morishige
Ostrich Taxi	Keiichi Nanba
TV Announcer	Noritsugu Watanabe
Crow Guards	Jun'ichi Sugawara; Isshin Chiba
Beautician	Takeshi Aono
Lady	Rikako Aikawa
Crane	Hiroko Emori
Gull	Roko Takizawa
Chicken	Tomie Kataoka
Ostrich	Chafurin
Tamako Nobi	Sachiko Chijimatsu
Hidetoshi Dekisugi	Sumiko Shirakawa

== Release ==
The film was released in Japan on 10 March 2001.

It was released days before in Taiwan on 8 March 2001. It was released in India on 8 September 2019 under the title 'Doraemon The Movie: Nobita Aur Birdopia Ka Sultan' ("Doraemon The Movie: Nobita and The Sultan of Birdopia" in English translation)

== See also ==
- List of Doraemon films
