= Dorami & Doraemons: Space Land's Critical Event =

2001 film by Hiroshi Nishikiori

Dorami & Doraemons: Space Land's Critical Event!
- Kanji: ドラミ&ドラえもんズ 宇宙ランド危機イッパツ!
- Revised Hepburn: Dorami & Doraemonzu Uchū Rando Kiki Ippatsu!
- Directed by: Hiroshi Nishikiori
- Screenplay by: Mamiko Ikeda
- Based on: Doraemon by Fujiko F. Fujio
- Produced by: Sojiro Masuko; Yoshihiko Ichikawa; Jun'ichi Kimura; Taro Iwamoto; Hideki Yamakawa
- Starring: Keiko Yokozawa; Mie Suzuki; Omi Minami
- Cinematography: Masahiro Kumagai
- Edited by: Hajime Okayasu; Toshihiko Kojima; Yumiko Nakaba; Hideaki Murai; Akikiro Kawasaki; Yoshitaka Miyake
- Music by: Shinji Miyazaki
- Production company: Shin-Ei Animation
- Distributed by: Toho
- Release date: March 10, 2001 (Japan)
- Running time: 16 minutes
- Country: Japan
- Language: Japanese
- Box office: $30.7 million

Dorami & Doraemons: Space Land's Critical Event! (ドラミ&ドラえもんズ 宇宙ランド危機イッパツ!, Dorami & Doraemonzu Uchū Rando Kiki Ippatsu!) is a 2001 Japanese animated science fiction comedy-drama short film.

It premiered theatrically in Japan on March 10, 2001 on a triple feature with Doraemon: Nobita and the Winged Braves and Good Luck! Gian!!.

It is the second and final Dorami & Doraemons short film following Dorami & Doraemons: Robot School's Seven Mysteries!? in 1996.

== Plot ==
Coming soon!

== Cast ==
Character	Japanese voice actor
Dorami	Keiko Yokozawa
Dora-rinho	Mie Suzuki
Pino	Omi Minami
Dora-the-Kid	Keiichi Nanba
Wang Dora	Megumi Hayashibara
Dora-nichov	Toshiharu Sakurai
El Matadora	Ryūsei Nakao
Dora-med III	Masaharu Satō
Mini-Doras	Rei Sakuma

== Soundtrack ==
=== Theme song ===
"Dorami Gamusharara!! Hetcharara!!" (ドラミ・ガムシャララ!!ヘッチャララ!!)
Lyrics: Chiyoko Mori / Composition: Takeshi Ike / Arrangement: Takeshi Ike / Vocals: Keiko Yokozawa
