= In A Thrilling Solar Car =

1992 film by Tetsuo Yasumi

- Directed by: Tetsuo Yasumi
- Based on: Doraemon by Fujiko F. Fujio
- Music by: Yuko Hara
- Production company: Shin-Ei Animation
- Distributed by: Toho
- Release date: March 7, 1992 (Japan)
- Running time: 5 minutes
- Country: Japan
- Language: Japanese
- Box office: $26.2 million

In A Thrilling Solar Car (トキメキソーラーくるまによん, Tokimeki Sōrā Kuruma ni Yon) is a 1992 Japanese animated science fiction comedy-drama short film. It premiered in Japan on March 7, 1992 on a triple feature with 21 Emon: Soraike! Hadashi no Princess and Doraemon: Nobita and the Kingdom of Clouds.

It is notable for never having been released on home video since its release, making it extremely rare.

== Production ==
The short film is a musical-style animated work that introduces the history of cars set to music by Yuko Hara and features characters from other Fujiko F. Fujio works such as Obake no Q-Tarō, Perman, and 21 Emon.

The franchise's main female protagonist, Shizuka Minamoto, does not appear and is replaced by secondary character Dorami.

The short has never been released on home video and is rarely ever shown at past Doraemon film screenings, with the short's last known screening occurring in 2020 at the month long Doraemon Movie Festival 2020.

== Soundtrack ==
=== Theme songs ===
"Harmony of the Stars" (星のハーモニー)
Lyrics: Yuko Hara / Composition: Yuko Hara / Arrangement: Takeshi Kobayashi / Vocals: Yuko Hara
"Tokyo Love Call" (東京ラブコール)
Lyrics: Keisuke Kuwata / Composition: Keisuke Kuwata / Arrangement: Keisuke Kuwata and Takeshi Kobayashi / Vocals: Yuko Hara

== See also ==
- List of Doraemon films
