= Keiko Yokozawa =

Japanese actress and narrator (born 1952)

- よこざわけい子
- Born: September 2, 1952 (age 74); Chūō-ku, Niigata, Niigata Prefecture, Japan
- Occupations: Voice actress; actress; narrator; vocalist; educator; CEO; founder; teacher; executive vice president; writer; manager
- Years active: 1972–present
- Agent: YU-RIN PRO.CO.ltd. (executive vice president)
- Notable work: Doraemon as Dorami; Mami the Psychic as Mami Sakura; Castle in the Sky as Sheeta; Little Ghost Q-Tarō as O-Jirō; Haikara-San: Here Comes Miss Modern as Benio Hanamura; Mobile Police Patlabor as Takeo Kumagami; Mega Man Legends as Roll Caskett; Okaasan to Issho as Fortissimo Piccolo
- Spouse: 1 (m. 1978)
- Children: 1

Keiko Nanba (難波 啓子, Nanba Keiko) née Yokozawa, born September 2, 1952 in Chūō-ku, Niigata, Niigata Prefecture, Japan, better known by the stage name Keiko Yokozawa (よこざわけい子, Yokozawa Keiko), is a Japanese voice actress, actress, and narrator. She is also the founder and executive vice president of the Japanese talent agency YU-RIN PRO.CO.ltd. She also runs The Keiko Yokozawa Voice Acting and Narration School. Her former stage name was Keiko Yokozawa (横沢 啓子, Yokozawa Keiko).

She is most well known for her voice acting roles as Dorami in Doraemon, the titular character in Mami the Psychic, Sheeta in Castle in the Sky, O-Jirō in Little Ghost Q-Tarō, Benio Hanamura in Haikara-San: Here Comes Miss Modern, Takeo Kumagami in Mobile Police Patlabor, Roll Caskett in Mega Man Legends, and Fortissimo Piccolo in Okaasan to Issho.

== Biography ==
Yokozawa was born on September 2, 1952, in Chūō-ku, Niigata, Niigata Prefecture as the daughter of Kyūhachi Yokozawa, a junior high school English teacher.

Although she didn't want to be a voice actress originally, both of her parents, having struggled with Niigata dialect themselves, wanted her to speak standard Japanese, so they enrolled her into a children's theatre company. It ended up disbanding only three years after she joined, but she was able to become a regular in radio dramas thanks to the close acquaintances she made during the time.

In her kindergarten years, Yokozawa would take ballet, piano, and art lessons, but didn't like piano or ballet very much, and only enjoyed making art. From that point on, she had apparently disliked music.

When she was in middle school and high school, she thought about becoming an actress. Whenever she would step on-stage in school plays, she would feel a sense of exhilaration, but that was about it. If she had been more confident about her overall appearance, she would have wanted to become an actress, but because she wasn't, she thought, "That path isn't really for me..." However her parents told her, "Since you've gone to all that trouble to study that, you should become an announcer or something like that."

She graduated from Niigata High School. During Yokozawa's time at junior high school, things like The Time Tunnel were popular and made her want to become a scientist. At the time, she would keep saying "I'm going to do that", but her mother ended up telling her teacher, who then called her in and suggested that she become a news announcer instead.

Now aspiring to become a voice actor, she thought that she could use what she learned to play a wide range of roles, so she decided to pursue a career in voice acting and enrolled in the Broadcasting Department at the Nihon University College of Art.

Per the recommendation of Hisashi Katsuta, she entered Haikyō's "affiliated training school" (now known as the Haikyō Drama Research Institute), and while she enrolled, she made her drama début in Hanaguruma, which aired on NHK General TV, in 1974. Because she had to travel back and forth to Osaka Prefecture for a year to record, she dropped out of the Broadcasting Department. At first, Yokozawa did roles in TV dramas where she showed her face.

What prompted Yokozawa to switch to voice acting work was recording a television commercial for Agnes Lum. At the time, there was no one who matched the actresses' voice image, so Yokozawa was called in at the last minute to provide her dubbing voice. Afterwards the Tokyo Actor's Consumer's Cooperative Society, which she was affiliated with at the time, thought she did voice acting too.

At one point, she was split between acting in TV dramas and doing voice acting. However, as the time required for television dramas increased, it became difficult balancing the two, so Yokozawa decided to solely focus on voice acting, which was what she had really wanted to do. When she first started her voice acting career, she mainly did dubbing for foreign films that aired on NHK.

In 1975, Yokozawa made her voice acting début in Time Bokan. Her first regular role was as Kyoko in Dokaben and her first heroine role was Nina in Paul's Miraculous Adventure.

In 1980, Yokozawa got the role of Dorami in Doraemon and it became one of her most well known roles. She voiced the character of Dorami from her debut in 1980 until the series ended in March 2005, being followed up by a reboot series less than a month later.

In 1982, she started voicing the role of Fortissimo Piccolo in Niko Niko Pun, which aired as a puppet show segment on the long-running program Okaasan to Issho.

She also played leading heroine roles in many other productions throughout the 1980s.

Wanting to do narration in addition to a voice actress, Yokozawa worked at the Tokyo Actor's Consumer's Cooperative Society before she founded the talent agency YU-RIN PRO in 1988. After that, she decided to retire from frontline voice acting to focus on training the next generation at The Keiko Yokozawa Voice Acting and Narration School. When she decided to start up YU-RIN PRO, she also founded the school at the same time, as she wanted people she had trained to affiliate with her.

YU-RIN PRO's name came from a picture book that Yokozawa wrote for her daughter called Yukiko Yurin. She currently writes and directs theater performances by the actors and training school students who affiliate with YU-RIN PRO.

In February 2026, Yokozawa was announced to have won the Merit Award at the 20th Seiyu Awards. She received the award the following month.

== Personality ==
Her voice range is soprano. She has a slightly sweet sounding speaking voice.

Yokozawa is known for commonly voicing cheerful, happy, and bubbly character roles.

Whenever she acts, she always fully immerses herself into it. And when she has to have to prepare for a role, she focuses on building the character during the audition process, as auditions are normally held in advance. She's said that when its the day to record, she normally receives the script, thinks to herself "Oh, so this is the kind of story it is", and before she knows it, recording the dialogue is already completed.

If she has to voice a character in an adaptation of a pre-existing property, she always makes sure to read and study the original source material before the auditioning process. If it's an original work, she approaches by looking at the character sketches normally provided on-site and using a voice that "naturally comes to mind".

When she first started her career as a voice actress, her goals were to land a leading character role in a Fujiko anime and to make appearances in children's programs. By the time she was in her thirties, both of dreams were accomplished, as she voiced the titular character Mami Sakura in Esper Mami and appeared in the children's program Niko Niko Pun as Fortissimo Piccolo, so when she established her agency YU-RIN PRO's own school, she had felt as if her acting career came to a natural conclusion.

Hayao Miyazaki criticized her performance as Sheeta in Castle in the Sky. In stark contrast, when she voiced Mami Sakura in Esper Mami, original author Fujiko F. Fujio gave her performance high praise, describing her acting as "healthy and good".

During her middle school years, she was a member of the soft tennis club and in college, she was a member of the figure skating club, though could only skate by lifting up her feet slightly.

Her hobby and special skill is swimming.

She has a younger sister.

Her husband works as a salaried employee at a company that designs and consults on projects like an artificial beach. He can also analyse on how to install terapods to prevent coastal erosion. While she and her husband got married in October 1978, they had first met way back at a cultural festival that was held during her first year of high school. They started to dating shortly after and decided to marry during high school.

As mentioned previously, she also has a daughter.

== Filmography ==
=== Television animation ===
List of voice performances in television animation
Year	Title	Role	Notes	Source
1975–76	Time Bokan	Christine, Junko, Satchi	Christine in Ep. 3, Substitute voice of Junko from Eps. 34-36	
1975	The Adventures of Pepero	Lily, Chu-chu's older sister, Girl A		
1976	3000 Leagues in Search of Mother	Joanna		
1976	UFO Warrior Dai Apolon	Junko		
1976	Paul's Miraculous Adventure	Nina	Main role	
1976	Blocker Gundan 4 Machine Blaster	Sachiko	Ep. 14	
1976–77	Dokaben	Kyoko Asahina, Akiko		
1976	New Don Chuck Story	Lala	Third voice; Eps. 37-73	
1977	Robokko Beeton	Additional voice		
1977	Yatterman	Maria, Marie, Princess Mari, Anne	Maria in Ep. 5	
1977	Mechander Robo	Mika Shikishima		
1977	Attack on Tomorrow!	Sumie Nishii		
1977	Monarch: The Big Bear of Tallac	Jill		
1977	Chōgattai Majutsu Robo Ginguiser	Maiko		
1977	Ippatsu Kanta-kun	Tobashi Goko, Tobashi Rokuko		
1977	Charlotte of the Young Grass	Charlotte		
1977	Dinosaur War Izenborg	Miyuki, Elena	Miyuki in Ep. 6	
1977	Super Electromagnetic Machine Voltes V	Rosalia	Ep. 28	
1978	The Story of Perrine	Merca		
1978	Haikara-San: Here Comes Miss Modern	Benio Hanamura		
1978	Her Majesty's Petite Angie	Sherry	Ep. 24	
1978–79	The Prince of the Stars: Le Petit Prince	Saten, Hannah, Glinka		
1979	Song of Baseball Enthusiasts	Yūko	Eps. 16-17	
1979	Lunlun the Flower Child	Elene		
1979	Zenderman	Himiko, Crane	Himiko in Ep. 4, Crane in Ep. 26	
1979–2005	Doraemon	Dorami, Michiko Minamoto, Fuuko, Roboko, Honest Taro, Aare Okkana, Sumire Hoshino, Mami Sakura, Additional voice	Main role; First voice of Michiko Minamoto	
1979	Bannertail: The Story of Gray Squirrel	Sue Silvergray	Main role	
1979	Maegami Taro	Princess	Television special	
1979–80	Scientific Adventure Team Tansar 5	Rui Shinpi		
1979	Lupin the 3rd Part II	Ellie Sattler	Ep. 103	
1979–80	Misha the Little Bear	Misha	Lead role	
1979–80	Story of the Knights of the Round Table: Blazing Arthur	Marine	Eps. 7, 16, 17, 19	
1980	Kirin Tomorrow's Calendar	Assistant, Office Lady		
1980	The Wonderful Adventures of Nils	Village Boy, Mads	Village Boy in Ep. 1, Mads in Eps. 21 and 35	
1980–81	Galaxy Express 999	Hanako, Naya, Zoya, Mirai	Hanako in Eps. 60-61, Naya in Ep. 85, Zoya in Ep. 92, Mirai in Eps. 112-113	
1980	Sue Cat	Maria Mikemura		
1980–81	Space Runaway Ideon	Lin Formosa		
1980	Burn, Arthur: The Prince of the White Horse	Lily		
1980	Foolish Knight – Don of La Mancha	Caldera	Ep. 5	
1980	Gatchaman Fighter	Lucy	Ep. 33	
1980–81	Space Warrior Baldios	Jamie Hoshino		
1980	Astro Boy	Livian	Incorrectly credited as "Keiko Yokoyama" (横山啓子)	
1980–81	Muteking, The Dashing Warrior	Sayuri		
1981	The Story of Cuore, School of Love	Pietro Precossi		
1981	Belle and Sebastian	Angelina		
1981	Ashita no Joe 2	Jun Shioya		
1981	Strongest Robo Daioja	Kukiru, Lily		
1981	Ninja Hattori-kun	Princess, Yuki, Kanako		
1981	Miss Machiko	Shinichi Ogura, Sayuri Yanagi	Sayuri Yanagi in Ep. 58	
1981–83	Urusei Yatsura	Ten's mother, Additional voice	First voice of Ten's mother	
1981–82	Tiger Mask II	Gina Gostra	Debuts Ep. 27	
1982	Fisherman Sanpei	Fumiko	Ep. 96	
1982	Game Center Arashi	Sumire Matsumoto	First voice	
1982	Boku Patalliro!	Marion	Ep. 4	
1982	Anime Yasei no Sakebi	Additional voice		
1982	The Monster Kid	Mika Hayashi		
1982	Manga Mito Kōmon	Additional voice		
1982–84	The Pumpkin Wine	Natsumi Asaoka/L		
1982	Roly-Poly Pollon – The Story of a Bratty Goddess	Medusa, Hippolyta		
1982	Pro Golfer Saru	Benibachi	Television special	
1982–83	Sarutobi as Expected	Shoko Fujibayashi, Junko		
1983	Future Policeman Urashiman	Sophia Nina Rose		
1983	Galactic Gale Baxingar	Natasha		
1983	Akū Daisakusen Srungle	Luise, Teleshia	Luise in Ep. 10, Teleshia in Ep. 23	
1983	Mrs. Pepper Pot	Jin, Little Bon, Par, Lou		
1983	Fuku-chan	Tsuyoshi Matsubara		
1983	Miyuki	Koharu	Eps. 25-26	
1984	Super High Speed Galvion	Rei Midoriyama		
1984	Oyoneko Boonyan	Uzura Yudeta		
1984	Ranpō	Princess Etabira		
1985	Star Musketeer Bismark	Roy, Joan Clementine	First voice of Joan Clementine	
1985	Sherlock Hound	Ellen	Ep. 8	
1985	Captain Tsubasa	Yumiko Yamaoka		
1985	Perman	Kasumi, Sumire's mom	Kasumi in Ep. 489, Sumire's mom in Ep. 490	
1985	Little Ghost Q-Tarō	O-Jirō		
1985	Flaming Alpen Rose: Judy & Randy	Clara		
1985	The Prince of Devil Island: The Three-Eyed One	Pandora	Television film	
1987	Mami the Psychic	Mami Sakura	Lead role	
1987	Lady Lady!!	Misuzu Midorikawa		
1987	The Three Musketeers: The Animation	Charlotte	Eps. 9-10	
1988	City Hunter 2	Kumi Akamatsu	Ep. 12	
1989	Dragon Ball	Annin	Eps. 152-153	
1989	Let's Go! Anpanman	Princess Muscat	First voice	
1990	Gatapishi	Gatapishi	Lead role	
1990	Patlabor the Mobile Police on Television	Takeo Kumagami		
1992	Sazae-san	Fortissimo Piccolo	Guest appearance	
1994	BLUE SEED	Yaobikuni		
2011	Nichijou - My Ordinary Life	Nano's Wind-Up Key, Narration	Ep. 25	

=== Theatrical animation ===
List of voice performances in theatrical animation
Year	Title	Role	Notes	Source
1979	Adventures of the Polar Cubs	Yūrii		
1980	Doraemon: Nobita's Dinosaur	Piisuke		
1980	3000 Leagues in Search of Mother	Fana		
1982	Gauche the Cellist	Child Mouse, Girl with Viola		
1982	Ninja Hattori-kun: Abracadabra Magic Picture Diary	Princess	Short film	
1982	The Ideon: A Contact	Lin Formosa		
1982	The Ideon: Be Invoked	Lin Formosa		
1984	Doraemon: Nobita's Great Adventure into the Underworld	Dorami		
1984	Ninja Hattori-kun + Perman: Psychic Wars	Princess	Short film	
1984	The Pumpkin Wine: Nita's Love Story	Natsumi Asaoka/L		
1985	Ninja Hattori-kun + Perman: Ninja Monster Jippō vs. Miracle Egg	Princess	Short film	
1986	Little Ghost Q-Tarō: Jump Out! Operation Bakebake	O-Jirō	Short film	
1986	Castle in the Sky	Sheeta		
1987	Little Ghost Q-Tarō: Jump Out! Operation 1/100	O-Jirō	Short film	
1988	Doraemon: The Record of Nobita's Parallel Visit to the West	Dorami		
1988	Mami the Psychic: Dancing Doll of the Starry Sky	Mami Sakura	Short film	
1989	The Three Musketeers: The Adventures of Aramis	Katherina		
1989	Dorami-chan: Mini-Dora SOS!!!	Dorami	Short film	
1990	It's the Ocean! It's Time to Sail! Niko Niko Pun	Fortissimo Piccolo		
1991	Dorami-chan: Wow, The Kid Gang of Bandits!	Dorami	Short film	
1991	Fly! Peek the Whale	Myra		
1993	Dorami-chan: Hello, Dynosis Kids!!	Dorami	Short film	
1994	Dorami-chan: A Blue Straw Hat	Dorami	Short film	
1995	2112: The Birth of Doraemon	Dorami	Short film	
1996	Dorami & Doraemons: Robot School's Seven Mysteries!?	Dorami	Short film	
1997	Doraemon: Nobita and the Spiral City	Wookey		
1998	Doraemon Comes Back	Dorami	Short film	
2001	Dorami & Doraemons: Space Land's Critical Event!	Dorami	Short film	
2018	Haikara-San: Here Comes Miss Modern Part 2	Narration		

=== Original video animation (OVA) ===
List of voice performances in original video animation
Year	Title	Role	Notes	Source
1985	Karuizawa Syndrome	Kuno En		
1985	Justy	Jelna Flarestar		
1988	New Story of Aura Battler Dunbine	Silky Mau		
1989	Legend of Lemnear	Lian		
1990–92	Patlabor: The New Files	Takeo Kumagami		
1994	Plastic Little: The Adventures of Captain Tita	Mei Lin Jones		

=== Short film animation ===
List of voice performances in short film animation
Year	Title	Role	Notes	Source
2015	Kiteretsu Daihyakka & Doraemon: Korosuke's First Errand	O-Jirō		
2024	Doraemon & F-Character All-Stars: The City of Dreams, F Land	Mami Sakura, O-Jirō		

=== Video games ===
List of voice performances in video games
Year	Series	Role	Notes	Source
1992	Doraemon: Nobita's Dorabian Nights	Dorami	PC Engine Super CD-ROM²	
1993	Patlabor The Mobile Police: Chaptor of Griffon	Takeo Kumagami	PC Engine Super CD-ROM²	
1995	The Doraemons	Dorami	3DO	
1995	Doraemon 4: Nobita to Tsuki no Oukoku	Dorami	Super Famicom	
1997–2008	Mega Man Legends series	Roll Caskett		
2000	Doraemon 3: Nobita no Machi SOS!	Dorami	Nintendo 64	
2000	Patlabor The Mobile Police: Game Edition	Takeo Kumagami	Playstation	
2001	Doraemon: Secret Yojigen Pocket	Dorami	Playstation	
2005	Namco × Capcom	Roll Caskett	Playstation 2	
2018–2025	Super Robot Wars series	Silky Mau		

=== Dubbing roles ===
==== Live-action ====
List of dub performances in live-action productions
Title	Role	Notes	Source
The Sound of Music	Liesl von Trapp (Charmian Carr)		
The Passage	Leah Bergson (Kay Lenz)		

==== Animation ====
List of dub performances in animation productions
Title	Role	Notes	Source
Fun and Fancy Free	Singing Harp		
Star Wars: Ewoks	Latara	VHS edition	
The Brave Little Toaster	Toaster	1993 NHK edition	
PB&J Otter	Connie Crane		

=== Television programs ===
List of voice performances in television programs
Title	Role	Notes	Source
Niko Niko Pun	Fortissimo Piccolo	In Okaasan to Issho	

=== Commercials ===
List of voice performances in commercials
Year	Title	Role	Notes	Source
1975	Emeron Minky Rinse	Agnes Lum	second voice	
1986	Pocket Saurus Giveaway	Voiceover	promotional giveaway for toothpaste and toothbrush products	

=== Miscellaneous ===
- Doraemon (1979-2005): Theme song performance (ED)
- The Pumpkin Wine (1982-1984): Theme song performance (ED2)
- Gatapishi (1990-1991): Theme song performance (ED)

== Related people ==
- Masanori Takai – Former TV Asahi announcer and current freelance announcer with Sun Music Production.
- Motomi Kōsaka – Former announcer at Niigata Broadcasting and director of the Kita Ward Cultural Center in Niigata City.
- Kaori Ishizuka – Announcer at Niigata Broadcasting.

== Awards ==
Year	Award	Category	Result	Ref.
2026	20th Seiyu Awards	Merit Award	Honored	
