= Yōsuke Naka =

Japanese actor (1930–2023)

- 中 庸助
- Born: Kazuo Nakajima (中島 和男); March 30, 1930; Chiba City, Chiba Prefecture, Japan
- Died: October 20, 2023 (aged 93)
- Occupations: Actor; voice actor
- Years active: 1950–2023
- Agent: Mausu Promotion
- Notable credits: Doraemon as Nobisuke Nobi; Kamen Rider as Admiral Majin

Yōsuke Naka (中 庸助, Naka Yōsuke; born Kazuo Nakajima (中島 和男, Nakajama Kazuo) March 30, 1930 – October 20, 2023) was a Japanese actor from Chiba City, Chiba Prefecture.

He is best known for his roles as Admiral Majin in Kamen Rider, Nobisuke Nobi in Doraemon, Ehrenberg in Legend of the Galactic Heroes, Mulligan in Sohryuden: Legend of the Dragon Kings, and Nijūemon Tsuzureya (20 Emon) in 21 Emon.

== Biography ==
=== Career ===
Born in Chiba, Chiba Prefecture, Japan on March 30, 1930, Naka graduated from Chiba Prefectural Chiba First High School.

In 1953, Naka joined the Chiba City Civic Hall. Despite wanting to originally become a writer, he was a somewhat naturally lazy person, so he never even got as far as to think that he'd ever try to write plays, but instead, he ended up in the world of acting. He moved to Tokyo during the Shinkigeki boom and was introduced to several Shinkigeki-style theatre companies by Yotaro Nishizawa, the editor-in-chief of theatre magazine Tragedy and Comedy by Hayakawa Publishing. While he still couldn't decided on which company to join, Naka had heard that the Enza Theater Company had been searching for actors, so he ended up joining without as much as a second thought. After he joined Enza in 1956, he joined the Mirai Gekijō theater company two years later, then the Zokei theater company three years after that, before finally joining the Tōgei theater company, where he ended up spending days on-stage. Though at that period in time, the attitude that society had grown toward theater company actors was harsh, to the point where even renting an apartment became a struggle, and life was incredibly hard.

During this time, Naka would take on performing small roles in dramas such as Dial 110, Crime Reporter, and Seven Detectives, but his income remained stagnant, and he would spend days juggling part-time jobs while resuming his work on-stage. Eventually he began to receive offers to perform dubbing for foreign shows. Although the pay then was only about 70% of the usual rate, the amount of shows was huge, and Naka was finally able to stabilize his livelihood.

While continuing to dub foreign dramas, Naka met a manager who invited him to "give it a serious try", leading him to start appearing in Toei Company television dramas. On Special Mobile Investigation Squad, Naka would play criminal roles. He was approached regarding this when the show switched to a three-unit system: "Hey, Naka, isn't it about time you played a detective instead of a criminal?" He turned down the offer, replying, "It's more interesting to play villains because I can portray so many different types." People told him that he was weird for thinking that, which Naka himself would later reflect on, saying, "Looking back now, it might have been a mistake."

Eventually, as the mainstream of television dramas shifted to two-hour specials and work began to dwindle, Naka asked the president of his agency to if they could let him partake in dubbing the foreign drama Hill Street Blues. While he going on record to say that the long monologues were painful, from that point on, voice acting became his main profession.

After working with G&B Planning, Murakami Office, and Kumazawa Production, he joined Mausu Promotion, his last affiliation.

=== Death ===
Naka died on October 20, 2023, at the age of 93. Mausu announced his death that November.

== Personality ==
In tokusatsu productions, Naka often portrayed villainous commanders, most famously Admiral Majin in the Kamen Rider series. He would also often portray villainous roles in period dramas and yakuza bosses in police dramas.

His most famous voice acting role was as Nobita's father Nobisuke Nobi in the Doraemon anime from 1992 to 2005. Naka was cast on short notice, as the previous voice actor, Masayuki Katō, had stepped down due to ongoing health problems. Naka was a personal friend of Katō's and accepted the offer with the intention of "carrying on his friend's legacy".

He stepped down from the role of Nobisuke in March 2005 with the end of the 1979 series, with the role being succeeded by Yasunori Matsumoto for the 2005 reboot.

== Successors ==
After his death, the following individuals have taken over his roles.

Successor	Character	Work	Debut
Chihiro Nishimori	Nikko Kador	Invasion U.S.A.	Blu-ray release bonus content

== Filmography ==
=== Television dramas ===
List of performances in television dramas
Year	Title	Role	Notes	Source
1957	Dial 110			
1958	Crime Reporter			
1961	Seven Detectives			
1965	Taikōki			
1968	Ryōma ga Yuku			
1965–1977	Special Mobile Investigation Unit	Various characters		
1967	Kaiju Booska	Totsu-Otsu Real Estate employee		
1968	Three Outlaw Samurai	Carpenter, Akamatsu, Zōngjí	Akamatsu in Season 5, Zōngjí in Season 6	
1968	Princess Comet	Site Supervisor		
1968	Key Hunter			
1969	Kappa Sanpei: The Yokai Operation			
1969	Playgirl	Various characters		
1969	Tokyo Bypass Directive			
1969	Muyōnosuke	Two-Eyed Demon	Ep. 9	
1980	Kamen Rider	Admiral Majin	Episodes 17–53	
1980	New Edo no Kaze	Sugai	Ep. 1	
1983	The Chronicles of Nemuri Kyoshiro	Dōan	Ep. 21	
1983	Asadora / Oshin			
1983	Thursday Prime-Time Drama / The Sea Wall			
1984	Sakichi the Shooting Star			
1985	Saturday Wide Theater / The Woman Loved by a Rapist			
1990	Tsukikage Hyogo's Wild Journey	Dojo Master	Season 2	
2003	THE MONDAY NIGHT MYSTERY THEATER / Seiichi Morimura Suspense Series	Angler		

=== Theatrical films ===
List of performances in theatrical films
Year	Title	Role	Notes	Source
1967	A Fallen Woman	Yakuza B		
1969	From a Married Woman: The Rules of the Night	Ishiyama		
1970	Rebel Against Glory	Buddhist Monk		
1974	Lupin the Third: Strange Psychokinetic Strategy	Assassin Dōkasen		
1979	G.I. Samurai	Defeated Warrior		
1980	Kamen Rider: 8 Riders VS Galaxy King	Admiral Majin		
1985	Fire Festival	Fisherman		
1989	Yawara!	Yanagisawa Director		

=== Television animation ===
List of voice performances in television animation
Year	Title	Role	Notes	Source
1979	Heidi, Girl of the Alps	The Doctor		
1982	Dash Kappei	Katsuhei's grandfather		
1983	Space Adventure Cobra	Pumpkin	Eps. 28–29, and 31	
1983	Mirai Keisatsu Urashiman	Catsburg		
1984	Cat's Eye	Maejima		
1984	Lupin the Third: Part III	Wang Daquan	Ep. 21	
1989–1990	The Adventures of Hutch the Honeybee	Stag Beetle Grandpa, Ronin		
1991	Oishinbo	Hiyama, Director of Personnel		
1991	Yawara!	Director Yanagisawa, University President		
1991	21 Emon	Nijūemon Tsuzureya (20 Emon)		
1992–2005	Doraemon	Nobisuke Nobi	Second voice	
1992	The Laughing Salesman	Shuro Yuji		
1995	Ninku	Old Man	Ep. 16	
1996	The Life and Adventures of Santa Claus	Bob O'Callaghan	Ep. 9	
1996	KochiKame: Tokyo Beat Cops	Owner		
1997	Berserk	Military Officer A		
1998	Master Keaton	Mr. Shinjo	Ep. 7	
2002	Ghost in the Shell: Stand Alone Complex	Nogi		
2002	Secret of Cerulean Sand	Duncan		
2005	Black Jack	Kenmochi (Karte 38)		
2006	Black Jack 21	Kenmochi (Karte 38)		
2018	Legend of the Galactic Heroes: Die Neue These - Encounter	Ehrenberg		

=== Theatrical animation ===
List of voice performances in theatrical animation
Year	Title	Role	Notes	Source
1991	The Heroic Legend of Arslan	Bahman	Ep. 2	
1992	The Heroic Legend of Arslan II	Bahman		
1992	21 Emon: To Space! The Barefoot Princess	Nijūemon Tsuzureya (20 Emon)		
1993	Doraemon: Nobita and the Tin Labyrinth	Nobisuke Nobi		
1994	Doraemon: Nobita's Three Visionary Swordsmen	General		
1994	Pom Poko	Food Stand Customer B		
1995	Doraemon: Nobita's Diary on the Creation of the World	Nobisuke Nobi		
1996	Doraemon: Nobita and the Galaxy Super-express	Mayor		
1997	Doraemon: Nobita and the Spiral City	Nobisuke Nobi		
1997	Spasibo at the End of the Edo Period	Kakichi Oaki		
1998	Doraemon: Nobita's Great Adventure in the South Seas	Nobisuke Nobi		
1998	Doraemon Comes Back	Nobisuke Nobi	Short film	
1999	Doraemon: Nobita Drifts in the Universe	Nobisuke Nobi		
2000	Doraemon: Nobita and the Legend of the Sun King	Leader		
2001	Good Luck! Gian!!	Nobisuke Nobi	Short film	
2002	The Day When I Was Born	Nobisuke Nobi	Short film	
2003	Doraemon: Nobita and the Windmasters	Captain of Time Patrol		
2004	Nitaboh	Kengyo		

=== Original video animation (OVA) ===
List of voice performances in original video animation
Year	Title	Role	Notes	Source
1989	Shinshuu Sudama Hen	Ōno Kurobei		
1989	David no Hoshi	Chief Detective, Genpei Ōtaguro	Chief Detective in Ep. 2, Genpei Ōtaguro in Ep. 4	
1990	Kentōshi	Eddie Williams		
1990	Mad Bull 34	Don Enrico	Ep. 2	
1991	Legend of the Phantom Heroes	Douglas		
1991	Tales of Yajikita College	Chairman Yoshida	Ep. 2	
1991	Shin David no Hoshi: Inma Densetsu	Priest		
1992	Spirit of Wonder: Miss China's Ring	Sullivan		
1992	Sohryuden: Legend of the Dragon Kings	Mulligan		
1994	Wild 7	Ginkaku Daigishi		

=== Web animation ===
List of voice performances in web animation
Year	Title	Role	Notes	Source
2017	Mouse Zoo	Yōsuke the Crane		

=== Video games ===
List of voice performances in video games
Year	Title	Role	Platform	Source
1998	Panzer Dragoon Saga	Damon	Sega Saturn	
2001	Kids Station: Doraemon: Himitsu no Yojigen Pocket	Nobisuke Nobi	Playstation	
2001	Boku, Doraemon	Nobisuke Nobi	Dreamcast	
2002	Tantei Jinguuji Saburo: Innocent Black	Fūrin Gōzō	Playstation 2	
2002	My Summer Vacation 2	Old Man Wolf	Playstation 2	
2003	True Crime: Streets of LA	George	Gamecube, Playstation 2, Xbox, Windows, Mobile, Mac OS X	
2005	Shinobido: Way of the Ninja	Onji	Playstation 2	
2010	My Summer Vacation Portable 2: The Riddle Sisters and the Secret of the Sunken Ship!	Old Man Wolf	Playstation Portable	

=== Dubbing ===
List of dub performances in overseas productions
Title	Role	Notes	Source
Sesame Street	Hanford (David Smyrl)	NHK version	
The Secret of NIMH	Jenner (Paul Shenar)		
Chip 'n Dale: Rescue Rangers	Fat Cat (Jim Cummings); Mr. Gribbish (Peter Cullen); Rat Capone (Jim Cummings)	New dubbed version	
2020 Nyeon Ujuui Wonder Kiddy	Additional voice		
Aladdin: The Series	Ayam Aghoul (Hamilton Camp)		
ReBoot	Megabyte (Tony Jay)	Cartoon Network version	
Spider-Man: The Animated Series	Silvermane (Jeff Corey)		
Batman: The Animated Series	Dr. Wakati (Roscoe Lee Browne)		
Angela Anaconda	Mayor Jamal		
