= Dorami & Doraemons: Robot School's Seven Mysteries =

1996 film by Yoshitomo Yonetani

Dorami & Doraemons: Robot School's Seven Mysteries!?
- Theatrical release poster
- Kanji: ドラミ&ドラえもんズ ロボット学校七不思議!?
- Revised Hepburn: Dorami & Doraemonzu Robot Gakkō Nanafushigi!?
- Directed by: Yoshitomo Yonetani
- Screenplay by: Yoshitomo Yonetani; Kenji Terada
- Based on: Doraemon by Fujiko F. Fujio
- Produced by: Sōichi Besshi; Sojiro Masuko; Jun'ichi Kimura; Taro Iwamoto
- Starring: Keiko Yokozawa; Keiichi Nanba; Gorō Naya; Masako Ikeda; Ichirō Nagai; Nobuyo Ōyama
- Edited by: Hajime Okayasu; Akihiro Kawasaki; Hideaki Murai; Kiyotaka Miyake; Toshihiko Kojima; Yumiko Nakaba
- Music by: Kohei Tanaka
- Production company: Shin-Ei Animation
- Distributed by: Toho
- Release date: March 2, 1996 (Japan)
- Running time: 31 minutes
- Country: Japan
- Language: Japanese
- Box office: $24.9 million

Dorami & Doraemons: Robot School's Seven Mysteries!? (ドラミ&ドラえもんズ ロボット学校七不思議!?, Dorami & Doraemonzu Robot Gakkō Nanafushigi!?) is a 1996 Japanese animated science fiction comedy-drama short film.

It premiered in theaters in Japan on March 2, 1996 on a double feature with Doraemon: Nobita and the Galaxy Super-express. It is the first Doraemons short film following the characters' debut in 2112: The Birth of Doraemon and the first Dorami & Doraemons short film.

The film's tagline is "The mighty Dora corps, The Doraemons take massive action! Protect Dorami with the power of friendship!!" (最強のドラ軍団、ザ・ドラえもんズが大活躍! 友情パワーでドラミを守れ!!)

== Plot ==
One day before her graduation, Dorami, her brother Doraemon, and Principal Teraodai notice a darkening sky, which precedes a lightning strike that activates a machine at the Robot School. A vacuum begins to suck in students and robots as Teraodai and Doraemon flee, with Dorami using her Takecopter to stay safe. Dorami loses her Takecopter and clings to Doraemon's whiskers, while Teraodai holds onto the other. As Doraemon runs faster, Dorami loses her gadgets, but eventually, both Doraemon and Teraodai are pulled into the vacuum, with Dorami narrowly escaping through a closing school door.

Dorami finds Doraemon's Bestfriend Telecard, which glows and signals his friends: Chinese martial artist robot cat Wang Dora, Brazilian soccer robot cat Dora-rinho, Saudi Arabian fortune telling robot cat Dora-med III, Russian lycanthropic robot cat Dora-nichov, Spanish matador robot cat El Matadora and American cowboy robot cat Dora-the-Kid. Together, they head to the Robot School to save Doraemon. At the Robot School, Dorami prays to a stained glass prince for help saving the school. Dora-the-Kid, riding his robot pegasus Ed, bursts through. Despite calling himself her prince, he is frustrated to find Dorami instead of Doraemon, referring to her as "immature and chubby." Dorami introduces herself, and he acknowledges her. Dora-the-Kid reveals his arrival was due to Doraemon's Bestfriend Telecard, and after learning the situation, he asks about Daddy No.13, only to find out Mommy No.14 is now in charge of the school.

The vacuum returns, and Dorami suggests fleeing, but Dora-the-Kid stays to rescue Doraemon. After failing to defeat the vacuum with his Air Cannon, he escapes with Dorami and Ed, only to crash into an invisible wall, causing Ed to be sucked in. Ultimately, Dora-the-Kid uses his Air Cannon to propel them both to safety. Dorami and Dora-the-Kid swim to a workshop where students craft various items. The crafting robot called the Iron Man of Tools traps them with glue after creating a Statue of Liberty mold using Dora-the-Kid's Air Cannon. Wang Dora rescues them and battles the Iron Man, but Dora-the-Kid's Air Cannon accidentally sends him and Dorami out of the room. Wang Dora defeats the Iron Man by cutting the machine's plug but is electrocuted while searching for Dora-the-Kid.

Dora-the-Kid and Dorami are rescued from an incinerator by Dora-med III on his magic carpet. While they worry about their friends, they find several students asleep due to blaring music from the school's pipe organ. Dora-med III attempts to counter the music with his own, but the pipe organ retaliates, destroying his instrument. Enraged, he grows into a giant and destroys the pipe organ, but this causes water to spill onto him, prompting his return to normal size while expressing his aquaphobia. Dorami panics on the fast-flying magic carpet, unable to control it. She tries to wake Dora-the-Kid, but they crash into a gym sign, losing the carpet. Dora-the-Kid wakes, and Dorami scolds him before becoming trapped under jumping boxes. He rescues her with the tennis racket, but the boxes come to life and attack. El Matadora arrives, advising Dorami to hide with Dora-the-Kid while he handles the boxes.

In the school's kitchen, Dorami makes a dorayaki for Dora-the-Kid, who praises her while revealing he was hungry because he hadn't eaten. When he asks for another dorayaki, Dorami explains she lacks ingredients, prompting him to kick the refrigerator, later revealed to a Refrigerator Robot, awakening it that freezes everything. Dora-the-Kid holds Dorami's hands to keep her warm as they discover frozen kitchen staff, including Dora-nichov. Dora-the-Kid triggers Dora-nichov's transformation by adjusting Dorami's bow. Dora-nichov breathes fire on the Refrigerator Robot after receiving hot sauce by Dora-the-Kid, incinerating it.

Dora-the-Kid and Dorami fall into the school's science lab, where they find several trapped students and meet Dora-rinho, who remembers he is there to save Doraemon. A Triceratops skeletal robot chases them, but Dora-rinho destroys it by kicking an Earth globe at it. Dora-rinho is then kidnapped, prompting Dora-the-Kid and Dorami to chase him to the audiovisual room.

The mysterious vacuum returns for Dora-the-Kid and Dorami, who deduce it is the school's old vacuum robot. Dorami deactivates it by jumping on its switch, but they are then taken to the recharging room, where they meet Daddy No.13. He admits to controlling the discarded robots and summons other the Doraemons, revealing they are under his control via antennae. Dora-the-Kid is forced to wear one and is told to put one on Dorami, but he unexpectedly places it on Doraemon, revealing that he remains unaffected due to his protective hat. Dora-the-Kid inspires the other Doraemons to break free from Daddy No.13's control by showcasing his Bestfriend Telecard, which recalls their friendship. This act destroys their antennae and allows Dorami and the Doraemons to neutralize Daddy No.13 and free the Robot School. Although Doraemon wakes up to assist in the effort, he arrives too late to help.

All of the other students are freed and the older robots are all restored again for use in the Robot School. During the credits, Dorami's graduation ceremony takes place, where she receives her diploma in front of friends and family. Noticing Dora-the-Kid missing, she rushes to catch him, finding him riding Ed's back. Dorami gifts him a new Air Cannon, and they both share a loving gaze.

== Cast ==
Character	Japanese voice actor
Dorami	Keiko Yokozawa
Dora-the-Kid	Keiichi Nanba
Wang Dora	Megumi Hayashibara
Dora-rinho	Mie Suzuki
Dora-nichov	Toshiharu Sakurai
El Matadora	Kyousei Tsukui
Dora-med III	Masaharu Satō
Doraemon	Nobuyo Ōyama
Principal Teraodai	Ichirō Nagai
Ed	Issei Futamata
Mommy No.14	Masako Ikeda
Iron Man of Tools	Daisuke Gōri
Refrigerator Robot	Yuu Shimaka
Model Robot	Chafurin
Daddy No.13	Gorō Naya

Characters such as Nobita, Shizuka, Suneo, Gian, Noramyako, Sewashi, Crow from Dorami-chan: A Blue Straw Hat, Arara from Dorami-chan: Wow, The Kid Gang of Bandits!, Mikujin from Doraemon: Nobita's Dorabian Nights, Juranosin from Dorami-chan: Hello, Dynosis Kids!!, and characters from the 21 Emon series all make non-speaking cameo appearances at Dorami's graduation during the credits.

== Production ==
The project was initially planned as a short film starring the Doraemons, but because Sōichi Besshi, who opposed the existence of The Doraemons, expressed heavy reluctance, it became a film starring Dorami as the main heroine instead.

== Soundtrack ==
=== Theme song ===
"I'll Never Forget You" (あなたを忘れない)
Lyrics: Toshihiko Takamizawa / Composition: Toshihiko Takamizawa / Arrangement: Akira Inoue / Vocals: Skirt

The song was previously used as the theme song for Doraventure Musical: Nobita and the Castle of the Undersea Devil and HEART ROCK MUSICAL Seika Monogatari.
