= Ganbare! Gian!! =

2001 film by Ayumu Watanabe

Good Luck! Gian!!
- Cover of the DVD release by Shogakukan and Pony Canyon including Doraemon: Nobita and the Winged Braves and Dorami & Doraemons: Space Land's Critical Event!
- Kanji: がんばれ! ジャイアン!!
- Revised Hepburn: Ganbare! Gian!!
- Directed by: Ayumu Watanabe
- Screenplay by: Nobuyuki Fujimoto
- Based on: Doraemon by Fujiko F. Fujio
- Produced by: Sojiro Masuko; Yoshihiko Ichikawa; Jun'ichi Kimura; Taro Iwamoto; Hideki Yamakawa
- Starring: Kazuya Tatekabe; Kazuyo Aoki; Nobuyo Ōyama; Noriko Ohara; Michiko Nomura; Kaneta Kimotsuki; Nozomu Sasaki
- Edited by: Hajime Okayasu; Toshihiko Kojima; Yumiko Nakaba; Hideaki Murai; Akihiro Kawasaki; Kiyotaka Miyake
- Music by: Shunsuke Kikuchi
- Production company: Shin-Ei Animation
- Distributed by: Toho
- Release date: March 10, 2001 (Japan)
- Running time: 26 minutes
- Country: Japan
- Language: Japanese
- Box office: $30.7 million

Good Luck! Gian!! (がんばれ! ジャイアン!!, Ganbare! Gian!!) is a 2001 Japanese animated science fiction comedy-drama short film.

It premiered in Japan on March 10, 2001 on a triple feature with Doraemon: Nobita and the Winged Braves and Dorami & Doraemons: Space Land's Critical Event!.

It is largely an expanded version of the 1989 chapter "Don't Cry, Jaiko" and the 1990 chapter "Jaiko's New Comic".

== Cast ==
Character	Japanese voice actor
Takeshi "Gian" Gōda	Kazuya Tatekabe
Jaiko Gōda	Kazuyo Aoki
Doraemon	Nobuyo Ōyama
Nobita Nobi	Noriko Ohara
Shizuka Minamoto	Michiko Nomura
Suneo Honekawa	Kaneta Kimotsuki
Moteo Mote	Nozomu Sasaki
Tamako Nobi	Sachiko Chijimatsu
Nobisuke Nobi	Yōsuke Naka
Mrs. Gōda	Kazuyo Aoki
Moteo's mother	Chiyoko Kawashima
"What Are You Looking For" Gadget	Rikako Aikawa
Hayashiya Sanpei I	Hayashiya Sanpei II

== Soundtrack ==
=== Theme song ===
"Don't Say Goodbye" (さよならとは言わないで)
Lyrics: DA CAPO / Composition: DA CAPO / Arrangement: Seiichi Kyoda / Vocals: DA CAPO

== Release ==
The short film was released theatrically in Japan on March 10, 2001 on a triple feature with Doraemon: Nobita and the Winged Braves and Dorami & Doraemons: Space Land's Critical Event!.

=== Streaming ===
In 2024, for the occasion of the 90th anniversary of Fujiko F. Fujio, Good Luck! Gian!! alongside numerous animated short films of Doraemon, Perman, Esper Mami, and Chimpui were made available to stream on Prime Video in Japan as the "Fujiko F. Fujio's 90th Anniversary Film Masterpiece Selection".
