= Toshiharu Sakurai =

Japanese voice actor (born 1964)

- 桜井 敏治
- Born: July 3, 1964 (age 62); Tokyo, Japan
- Occupation: Voice actor
- Agent: 81 Produce

Toshiharu Sakurai (桜井 敏治, Sakurai Toshiharu; born July 3, 1964) is a Japanese voice actor. He was born in Tokyo and is affiliated with 81 Produce.

He is known for his roles in anime such as Dora-nichov in The Doraemons.

He is also known for being the official Japanese dubbing voice for Shaggy Rogers in the Scooby-Doo franchise.

== Filmography ==
=== Television animation ===
- Dragon Quest (1989) (Mokomoko)
- Nadia: The Secret of Blue Water (1990) (Hanson, King)
- Honō no Tōkyūji: Dodge Danpei (1991) (Ozaki)
- Iron Virgin Jun (From 1992) (Black Skin Waiter)
- Tenchi in Tokyo (1997) (Kazuhiko Amagasaki)
- The Heroic Legend of Arslan (2015) (Inokentis VII)
- Maho Girls PreCure! (2016) (Isaac)

Unknown date

- Bleach (Tatsufusa Enjōji)
- Gunparade March (Mitsuhiro Nakamura)
- Hunter × Hunter (2011) (Tonpa)
- Infinite Ryvius (Charlie (Good Turtleland III), Akihiro Miyabi)
- Kaiji (Mamoru Andō)
- Law of Ueki (Bastero)
- Magical Princess Minky Momo (Cookbook)
- Mutant Turtles: Superman Legend (Michelangelo)
- Naruto (Poccha)
- Naruto Shippuden (Gamariki)
- Otaku no Video (Tanaka)
- Police Academy: The Animated Series (Eugene Tackleberry)
- Tenchi Muyo! (OVA) (Kazuhiko Amagasaki)
- The Doraemons (Dora-nichov)
- The World is Still Beautiful (Teteru Remercier)
- Yu-Gi-Oh! Duel Monsters GX (Iwamaru)

=== Video games ===
- Lego Dimensions (2015, Japanese-dubbed version) (Shaggy Rogers)

=== Tokusatsu ===
- Gekisou Sentai Carranger (Space Cockroach Goki-Chan/GG Goki-Chan/II Goki-Chan)
- Denji Sentai Megaranger (Rhinoceros Nejire (ep. 3))
- B-Robo Kabutack (Postbox)
- Seijuu Sentai Gingaman (Bombs (ep. 36))
- Kyuukyuu Sentai GoGo-V (Reward Psyma Beast Garaga (ep. 16))
- Ninpuu Sentai Hurricaneger (Dimensional Ninja Futabutabo (ep. 7))
- Bakuryuu Sentai Abaranger (Trinoid 16: Tsutakotatsu (ep. 27))
- Tokusou Sentai Dekaranger (Reversian Bon-Goblin Hells (ep. 21 - 22))
- Engine Sentai Go-onger (Savage Land Barbaric Machine Beast Jishaku Banki (ep. 5)/Denjishaku Banki (ep. 5))
- Samurai Sentai Shinkenger (Ayakashi Oinogare (ep. 19))
- Tokumei Sentai Go-Busters (Wataameloid (ep. 24))

=== Dubbing roles ===
==== Live-action ====
- Jonah Hill
  - Knocked Up (Jonah)
  - Superbad (Seth)
  - Forgetting Sarah Marshall (Matthew Van Der Wyk)
  - Get Him to the Greek (Aaron Green)
  - Moneyball (Peter Brand)
  - The Wolf of Wall Street (Donnie Azoff)
- Armageddon (2004 NTV edition) (Max Lennert (Ken Hudson Campbell))
- Beethoven (Harvey (Oliver Platt))
- Beethoven's 2nd (Floyd (Chris Penn))
- Cradle 2 the Grave (Tommy (Anthony Anderson))
- Cube (Kazan (Andrew Miller))
- Evolution (2005 NTV edition) (Deke Donald (Ethan Suplee))
- Exit Wounds (T. K. Johnson (Anthony Anderson))
- Flyboys (Briggs Lowry (Tyler Labine))
- Focus (Farhad (Adrian Martinez))
- Jurassic Park (Dennis Nedry (Wayne Knight))
- Kangaroo Jack (Louis Booker (Anthony Anderson))
- Mars Attacks! (Billy-Glen Norris (Jack Black))
- Mighty Morphin Power Rangers (Bulk, Goldar)
- Miss Congeniality (Agent Clonsky (John DiResta))
- The Rocker (Matt Gadman (Josh Gad))
- Shall We Dance? (Vern (Omar Benson Miller))
- The Sorcerer's Apprentice (Bennet Zurrow (Omar Benson Miller))
- Space Jam (Stan Podolak (Wayne Knight))
- The World's End (Peter Page (Eddie Marsan))
- The Wraith (1992 TV Asahi edition) (The Gutterboy (Jamie Bozian))
- Young Adult (Matt Freehauf (Patton Oswalt))

==== Animation ====
- Batman: The Brave and the Bold (Shaggy Rogers)
- Darkwing Duck (Herb Muddlefoot)
- Chicken Run (Fetcher)
- Johnny Bravo (Shaggy Rogers) (Episode: Bravo Dooby Doo)
- Scooby-Doo and the Alien Invaders (Shaggy Rogers)
- Scooby-Doo and the Cyber Chase (Shaggy Rogers)
- Scooby-Doo and Scrappy-Doo (Shaggy Rogers) (Cartoon Network Japan dub)
- Scooby-Doo! and the Witch's Ghost (Shaggy Rogers)
- Scooby-Doo on Zombie Island (Shaggy Rogers)
- Scooby-Doo, Where Are You! (Shaggy Rogers) (Cartoon Network Japan dub)
- Teenage Mutant Ninja Turtles (Michaelangelo)
- Teenage Mutant Ninja Turtles ('87 Michelangelo)
- Thomas & Friends (Harvey) (Succeeding Hikaru Midorikawa)
