= 2112: The Birth of Doraemon =

1995 film by Yoshitomo Yonetani

- Theatrical release poster
- Kanji: 2112年 ドラえもん誕生
- Revised Hepburn: 2112-Nen Doraemon Tanjō
- Directed by: Yoshitomo Yonetani
- Screenplay by: Yoshitomo Yonetani
- Based on: Doraemon by Fujiko F. Fujio
- Produced by: Sōichi Besshi; Sōjirō Masuko; Mia Koizumi; Junichi Kimura
- Starring: Nobuyo Ōyama; Chisa Yokoyama; Minoru Yada; Yoshiko Ōta; Yūko Minaguchi; Keiko Yokozawa; Ichirō Nagai; Kaneta Kimotsuki; Kazuya Tatekabe
- Edited by: Hajime Okayasu
- Music by: Shinji Miyazaki
- Production company: Shin-Ei Animation
- Distributed by: Toho
- Release date: March 4, 1995 (Japan)
- Running time: 31 minutes
- Country: Japan
- Language: Japanese
- Box office: $20.2 million

2112: The Birth of Doraemon (2112年 ドラえもん誕生, 2112-Nen Doraemon Tanjō) is a 1995 Japanese animated science fiction comedy-drama short film. It premiered in Japan on March 4, 1995 on a double feature with Doraemon: Nobita's Diary on the Creation of the World. It is a somewhat expanded version of the 1978 short story "The Birth of Doraemon", which details the events that led to the creation of Doraemon.

== Plot ==
In November 1969, manga artist Fujiko F. Fujio is unable to come up with an idea for a new serialized manga for a school magazine. Sitting at his desk at home, Fujiko laments the short amount of time left before the deadline and wishes that he had a time machine so that he could plagiarize his own future ideas.

In the 22nd century, on September 3, 2112, the Time Patrol are pursuing the notorious time criminal Dolmanstein and his henchman the Black Mask above the Matsushiba Robot Factory, a robot factory that is known for manufacturing cat-shaped babysitting robots. Dolmanstein and the Black Mask perform a time warp in order to escape, with the resulting shockwave striking a newly built robot cat named Doraemon. The impact causes a screw to pop out of his head and sends him tumbling down. He narrowly avoids being incinerated thanks to being rescued by a dancing robot cat named Noramyako, whom he falls in love with at first sight.

After heading to the Robot School, Doraemon devotes himself to his studies in class. However, because of his lost screw, he ends up struggling to keep up with his robot cat classmates. One day, Doraemon is summoned by the School's head, Principal Teraodai, who gets the idea to have him switch classes in order to make the most out of his special qualities. Noramyako happens to be in his new classtoom, much to their delight but to the chagrin of two robot bullies named Jaibee and Sunekichi. After the first class, Jaibee and Sunekichi try to take Doraemon's fourth-dimensional pocket, but Noramyako fends them off and saves Doraemon. More time passes, but Doraemon's grades still haven't improved, even on the day before the training school's graduation audition. Noramyako encourages him and pulls out a dorayaki from her fourth-dimensional pocket as a present.

The day of the audition comes and one by one, each of Doraemon's classmates end up being scouted. Doraemon tries to demonstrate his secret gadgets and abilities, but they end up failing on him. Just as his audition's time is about to end, a young baby named Sewashi pushes a button, and Doraemon ends up passing the audition. Sewashi's parents return home to see Doraemon with their son, but because Sewashi had taken a liking to him, they decide not to send him back and welcome Doraemon into the Nobi family as Sewashi's babysitter.

Years later, Sewashi, now a young child, is creating a Doraemon clay figurine and asks a robot mouse to help with finishing it by having the ears look just like Doraemon's. But the robot ends up misunderstanding the command and ends up biting off Doraemon's ears. Doraemon is rushed to the hospital to be repaired, but thanks to another accident that happens, Doraemon loses his ears completely. Noramyako comes to visit him in the hospital and ends up bursting into laughter at the sight of his now bald head. After leaving the hospital, Doraemon, in order to try and cheer himself up, pulls out what he thinks is "Source of Energy" gadget from his pocket, but mistakenly drinks "Source of Tragedy". He cries for three days straight, the vibrations causing his yellow paint to come off and his voice to become hoarse.

His new robot cat sister Dorami finds him and tells him that Sewashi had gone missing after leaving his home to find Doraemon. Doraemon tries to pull himself together, but mistakenly drinks the "Source of Speed", causing him to run across Tokyo Bay uncontrollably. Sewashi is sitting by the riverbank until Dolmanstein and the Black Mask appear again and decide to hold him hostage in the sky. Doraemon suddenly crashes into the jet's exhaust nozzle, freeing Sewashi and causing the jet to crash, with the Time Patrol arresting Dolmanstein and the Black Mask. Sewashi reunites with Doraemon and despite his different appearance and voice, he recognizes Doraemon, even complimenting his new appearance. Doraemon then quickly realizes that in the commotion, his fourth-dimensional pocket got lost. Dorami and Noramyako then show up, with Noramyako apologizing to Doraemon for him losing his ears and laughing at him, citing how because she had laughed so hard her jaw ended up dislocating, also confessing that she has fallen in love with him all over again.

Months later, on the night of Christmas Eve, Doraemon's classmates are all at Sewashi's house, with Sewashi finally presenting the clay Doraemon figurine to Doraemon. Everyone is about to eat cake together when suddenly, a shower of tiny Doraemon robots rain down from the sky. Principal Teraodai, dressed up as Santa, then appears and explains that the robots are "Mini-Doras", a special series of commemorative robots modeled after Doraemon as a reward for helping capture Dolmanstein and Black Mask. He then gives Doraemon a new fourth-dimensional pocket as a Christmas present. Teraodai requests that Doraemon pull something out of his new pocket, with Doraemon complying by pulling out the "Cheers Seed" drink gadget to liven up the party. As a Christmas present from Sewashi, Doraemon travels back in time to the 21st century using Sewashi's time machine to see Nobita, Sewashi's great-great-grandson, and aid him, also ensuring that Sewashi and his family live a happy life.

Back in the present, Fujiko gets startled by Doraemon popping out of his desk drawer. However, it turns out to be just a dream, as Fujiko had ended up dozing off until the morning. But after seeing cats on the rooftops outside his window and tripping over his daughter's roly-poly toy, Fujiko finally comes up with Doraemon, an episodic manga series telling the story of a cat-shaped robot who came from the 22nd century to aid a lazy boy with all kinds of magical futuristic gadgets from his pocket.

== Cast ==
Character	Japanese voice actor
Doraemon	Nobuyo Ōyama
Yellow Doraemon	Chisa Yokoyama
Fujiko F. Fujio	Minoru Yada
Sewashi	Yoshiko Ōta
Noramyako	Yūko Minaguchi
Dorami	Keiko Yokozawa
Jaibee (Note: Credited as "Gyrobo" (ジャイロボ) in the credits.)	Kazuya Tatekabe
Sunekichi (Note: Credited as "Sunerobot" (スネロボ) in the credits.)	Kaneta Kimotsuki
Principal Teraodai	Ichirō Nagai
Wang Dora	Kumiko Nishihara
Dora-nichov	Teiyū Ichiryūsai
El Matadora	Kazue Ikura
Dora-rinho	Mie Suzuki
Dora-the-Kid	Chisa Yokoyama
Mini-Doras	Unknown (Note: Their voice actor is not identified in the credits, though sources claim Rei Sakuma, who served as the second voice of Mini-Dora in the 1979 anime starting in 1994, provided their voice.)
Other Yellow Robot Cats	Chisa Yokoyama
Strict Robot Teacher (Note: Credited as "Shigoki Robot" (しごきロボット) in the credits.)	Ryōichi Tanaka
Doctor	Ginzō Matsuo
Sewashi's mother	Rei Sakuma
Announcer	Tomokazu Seki
Dolmanstein	Chikao Ōtsuka
Black Mask	Masashi Hirose
Masako Fujimoto (Fujiko F. Fujio's wife) (Note: Credited as "Oku-san" (奥さん) in the credits.)	Run Sasaki
Narration	Fujiko F. Fujio

== Production ==
The short depicts the story of Doraemon's creation, his life in the 22nd century, and his eventual departure to the 20th century to aid Nobita. Additionally, it also depicts the real life biographical story of how manga artist Fujiko F. Fujio created the series.

The voice cast includes Nobuyo Ōyama, Yoshiko Ōta, Keiko Yokozawa, Yūko Minaguchi, and more, with Fujiko F. Fujio providing the short's narration.

Multiple settings of Doraemon were revised and differed from past settings. According to director Yoshitomo Yonetani, Fujiko F. Fujio was dissatisfied with the heavy contradictions in previously published settings and origin stories featured in the manga and anime, so intended to consolidate and align them with the short film.

== Soundtrack ==
=== Theme song ===
"I'm Doraemon 2112" (ぼくドラえもん2112)
Lyrics: Fujiko F. Fujio / Composition: Shunsuke Kikuchi / Arrangement: Shunsuke Kikuchi / Vocals: Nobuyo Ōyama, Koorogi '73

=== Insert songs ===
"My Beloved Meow" (愛しのニャーオ)
Lyrics: Yumi Yoshimoto / Composition and Arrangement: Shunsuke Kikuchi / Vocals: Chisa Yokoyama
"Hello! Dorami-chan" (ハロー!ドラミちゃん)
Lyrics: Yumi Yoshimoto / Composition and Arrangement: Shunsuke Kikuchi / Vocals: Satoko Yamano

== Release ==
The short film was released in Japan on March 4, 1995.

It was screened theatrically on a double feature with the 16th Doraemon feature film Doraemon: Nobita's Diary on the Creation of the World.

=== Streaming ===
In 2024, for the occasion of the 90th anniversary of Fujiko F. Fujio, 2112: The Birth of Doraemon alongside numerous animated short films of Doraemon, Perman, Esper Mami, and Chimpui were made available to stream on Prime Video in Japan as the "Fujiko F. Fujio's 90th Anniversary Film Masterpiece Selection".

== Related work ==
Fujiko F. Fujio Museum animated short film The Birth of Doraemon (2020)

The animated short film The Birth of Doraemon (ドラえもん誕生) was screened at the Fujiko F. Fujio Museum's "F Theater" for the 50th anniversary of the Doraemon franchise. It adapts the manga chapter of the same name, with Wataru Hatano as the voice of Fujiko F. Fujio.
