= List of animated television series of the 1960s =

Animated television series first aired in the 1960s.

== 1960 ==
Title	Episodes	Country	Year	Notes	Technique
The New Adventures of Pinocchio	130	USCanadaJapan	1960–61		Stop Motion
Courageous Cat and Minute Mouse	130	US	1960–62		Traditional
Popeye the Sailor	220	US	1960–62		Traditional
The Flintstones	166	US	1960–66		Traditional
Firefly	8	USSR	1960-68		Traditional
King Leonardo and His Short Subjects	104	US	1960–63		Traditional
The Hunter	65	US	1960–63	King Leonardo and His Short Subjects segment	Traditional
Tooter Turtle	39	US	1960–63	King Leonardo and His Short Subjects segment	Traditional
Twinkles	48	US	1960–63	King Leonardo and His Short Subjects segment	Traditional
Q.T. Hush	100	US	1960–61		Traditional
The Bugs Bunny Show	684	US	1960–2000	Compilation Show	Traditional
The Nutty Squirrels Present	30	US	1960–61	Compilation Show	Traditional
Joe the Little Boom Boom	13	France	1960–63		Traditional
Hokey Wolf	26	US	1960–61	The Huckleberry Hound Show segment	Traditional
Foo-Foo	33	UK	1960		Traditional
Snip and Snap	26	UK	1960		Stop Motion
Mister Magoo	130	US	1960–62		Traditional

== 1961 ==
Title	Episodes	Country	Year	Notes	Technique
The Alvin Show	78	US	1961–62		Traditional
Clyde Crashcup	26	US	1961–62	The Alvin Show segment	Traditional
Davey and Goliath	66	US	1961–73		Stop Motion
The Dudley Do-Right Show	38	US	1961–70	Compilation Show excluding one episode from Rocky and Bullwinkle	Traditional
Top Cat	30	US	1961–62		Traditional
Calvin and the Colonel	26	US	1961–62		Traditional
Out of the Inkwell	100	US	1961–62		Traditional
Tales of the Wizard of Oz	200	US; Canada	1961		Traditional
The Dick Tracy Show	130	US	1961–62		Traditional
The Underseas Explorers		US	1961		Traditional
The Yogi Bear Show	33	US	1961–62		Traditional
The Smurfs	9	Belgium	1961–67		Traditional
Yakky Doodle	33	US	1961	Yogi Bear Show segment	Traditional
Snagglepuss	33	US	1961	Yogi Bear Show segment	Traditional
Pingwings	18	UK	1961–65		Stop Motion
Otogi Manga Calendar	366	Japan	1961–64		Anime
Minna no Uta		Japan	1961–present		Stop Motion

== 1962 ==
Title	Episodes	Country	Year	Notes	Technique
Deputy Dawg	34	US	1962–63		Traditional
The Jetsons	75	US	1962–63		Traditional
The Jetsons	75	US	1985–87		Traditional
Beany and Cecil	26	US	1962–69		Traditional
Jacek śpioszek	13	Poland	1962		Traditional
Space Angel	260	US	1962–64		Traditional
The Hanna-Barbera New Cartoon Series	52	US	1962–63		Traditional
Lippy the Lion & Hardy Har Har	52	US	1962–63	The Hanna-Barbera New Cartoon Series	Traditional
Touché Turtle and Dum Dum	52	US	1962–63	The Hanna-Barbera New Cartoon Series	Traditional
Wally Gator	52	US	1962–63	The Hanna-Barbera New Cartoon Series	Traditional
Hound for Hire	13	US	1962–63		Traditional
Snuffy Smith and Barney Google	27	US	1962	Comic Kings	Traditional

== 1963 ==
Title	Episodes	Country	Year	Notes	Technique
The Mighty Hercules	128	US; Canada	1963–66		Traditional
Rod Rocket	65	US	1963		Traditional
Tennessee Tuxedo and His Tales	70	US	1963–66		Traditional
Bolek and Lolek	150	Poland	1963–86		Traditional
Eitoman	56	Japan	1963–64		Anime
Sennin Buraku	23	Japan	1963–64		Anime
Astro Boy	193	Japan	1963–66		Anime
Tetsujin 28-Go (Gigantor)	97	Japan	1963–66		Anime
Hector Heathcote Show		US	1963–65		Traditional
The New Casper Cartoon Show	26	US	1963		Traditional
The Funny Company	260	US	1963		Traditional
Bleep and Booster	313	UK	1963–77		Traditional
Mr. Piper	39	Canada	1963–64	Compilation Show	Traditional
Daithi Lacha		Ireland	1963–69		Traditional
Le Manège Enchanté	400	France	1963		Traditional
Ōkami shônen Ken	86	Japan	1963–65		Anime

== 1964 ==
Title	Episodes	Country	Year	Notes	Technique
Shonen Ninja Kaze no Fujimaru	65	Japan	1964–65		Anime
Big X	59	Japan	1964–65		Anime
Gusztáv	120	Hungary	1964–77		Traditional
Jonny Quest	26	US	1964–65		Traditional
Hoppity Hooper	104	US	1964–75		Traditional
Underdog	124	US	1964–67		Traditional
The World of Commander McBragg	48	US	1964	Backup segment forTennessee Tuxedo and His Tales	Traditional
Peter Potamus and his Magic Flying Balloon	27	US	1964–65		Traditional
Breezly and Sneezly	23	US	1964–65	Peter Potamus and his Magic Flying Balloon	Traditional
Ricochet Rabbit & Droop-a-Long	23	US	1964–67	The Magilla Gorilla Show	Traditional
Punkin' Puss & Mushmouse	23	US	1964–67	The Magilla Gorilla Show	Traditional
Yippee, Yappee and Yahooey	23	US	1964–65	Peter Potamus and his Magic Flying Balloon	Traditional
The Porky Pig Show	26	US	1964	Compilation Show	Traditional
Zaczarowany ołówek	39	Poland	1964–77		Traditional
Magilla Gorilla	31	US	1964–67		Traditional
Sugar Bear	22	US	1964	Linus the Lionhearted	Traditional
Linus the Lionhearted	39	US	1964–69	Aka Linus, King of Beasts	Traditional
Rory Racoon	19	US	1964–69	Linus the Lionhearted	Traditional
So-Hi	37	US	1964–69	Linus the Lionhearted	Traditional
Loveable Truly	35	US	1964–69	Linus the Lionhearted	Traditional
The Big World of Little Adam	110	US	1964		Traditional

== 1965 ==
Title	Episodes	Country	Year	Notes	Technique
The Amazing 3	52	Japan	1965–66		Anime
Hustle Punch	26	Japan	1965–66		Anime
Prince Planet	52	Japan	1965–66		Anime
Kimba the White Lion	52	Japan	1965–67		Anime
Space Ace	52	Japan	1965–66		Anime
Atom Ant	26	US	1965–67	The Atom Ant/Secret Squirrel Show	Traditional
The Beatles	39	US; UK	1965–67		Traditional
DoDo, The Kid from Outer Space	75	UK	1965–70		Traditional
JOT the Dot	30	US	1965–74	Syndicated Christian Cartoon	Traditional
Milton the Monster	26	US	1965–67		Traditional
Roger Ramjet	156	US	1965		Traditional
Secret Squirrel	26	US	1965–66	The Atom Ant/Secret Squirrel Show	Traditional
The Atom Ant/Secret Squirrel Show	26	US	1965–66		Traditional
The Hillbilly Bears	26	US	1965–66	The Atom Ant/Secret Squirrel Show	Traditional
Precious Pupp	26	US	1965–66	The Atom Ant/Secret Squirrel Show	Traditional
Hey Mister, Let's Play!	11	Czech	1965–73		Stop Motion
Squiddly Diddly	26	US	1965–66	The Atom Ant/Secret Squirrel Show	Traditional
Winsome Witch	26	US	1965–66	The Atom Ant/Secret Squirrel Show	Traditional
The Astronut Show		US	1965		Traditional
Captain Fathom	26	US	1965		Syncro-Vox
The New 3 Stooges	156	US	1965	Spin-off of The Three Stooges	Traditional, Live-Action
Sinbad Jr. and his Magic Belt	86	US	1965–66		Traditional
The Pogles/Pogles' Wood	32	UK	1965–68		Stop Motion
Dolphin Ôji	3	Japan	1965		Anime
Super Jetter Mirai Kawa Kita Shonen	52	Japan	1965		Anime
Kaitô Pride	105	Japan	1965		Anime
Uchûjin Pipi	52	Japan	1965–67		Anime
Obake no Q-tarō	96	Japan	1965		Anime
Uchû Shônen Soran	96	Japan	1965		Anime
Uchû Patrol Hoppa	44	Japan	1965		Anime
Tatakae! Osper	52	Japan	1965		Anime

== 1966 ==
Title	Episodes	Country	Year	Notes	Technique
Go Go Gophers	48	US	1966	Backup segment for Underdog	Traditional
The King Kong Show	26	US; Canada; Japan	1966–67		Traditional
Tom of T.H.U.M.B	24	US	1966–69	Backup for The King Kong Show	Traditional
Leo the Lion	26	Japan	1966–67		Anime
Osomatsu-kun	60	Japan	1966–67		Anime
Sally the Witch	109	Japan	1966–68		Anime
Marude Dameo	52	Japan	1966–67	Lost Anime	Anime
Frankenstein Jr.	18	US	1966–68	Frankenstein Jr. and The Impossibles	Traditional
Space Ghost	40	US	1966–68	Space Ghost and Dino Boy	Traditional
Dino Boy in the Lost Valley	20	US	1966–68	Space Ghost and Dino Boy	Traditional
Rocket Robin Hood	52	Canada	1966–69		Traditional
Batfink	100	US	1966–67		Traditional
The New Adventures of Superman	68	US	1966–70		Traditional
Superboy	34	US	1966	segment of The New Adventures of Superman	Traditional
Bamse	15	Sweden	1966–81		Traditional
The Beagles	36	US	1966		Traditional
The Impossibles	36	US	1966		Traditional
Space Kidettes	20	US	1966–67		Traditional
Laurel and Hardy	156	US	1966	Spin-off of Laurel and Hardy	Traditional
The Road Runner Show	26	US	1966–72	Compilation Show	Traditional
The Super 6	13	US	1966		Traditional
Cool McCool	20	US	1966		Traditional
The Lone Ranger	26	US; UK	1966		Traditional
Mighty Heroes	21	US	1966		Traditional
Klondike Kat	26	US	1966	Backup segment for Tennessee Tuxedo and Underdog	Traditional
Camberwick Green	13	UK	1966		Stop Motion
Arthur! And the Square Knights of the Round Table	12	Australia	1966		Traditional
The Marvel Superheroes Show	65	United States	1966		Traditional
Robotan	104	Japan	1966	Lost Anime	Anime
Harris no Kaze	70	Japan	1966		Anime
Yûsei Kamen	39	Japan	1966		Anime
Kaizoku Ôji	31	Japan	1966		Anime
Tobidase! Bacchiri	132	Japan	1966		Anime
Ganbare! Marine Kid	13	Japan	1966		Anime
Monoshiri Daigaku Ashita No Calendar	1,274	Japan	1966		Anime

== 1967 ==
Title	Episodes	Country	Year	Notes	Technique
George of the Jungle	17	US	1967		Traditional
Journey to the Center of the Earth	17	US	1967–69		Traditional
Samson & Goliath (aka Young Samson and Goliath)	26	US	1967–68		Traditional
The Superman/Aquaman Hour of Adventure	36	US	1967–68	Package Series	Traditional
The Abbott and Costello Cartoon Show	156	US	1967–68	Spin-off of Abbott and Costello	Traditional
The Herculoids	18	US	1967–68		Traditional
Shazzan	36	US	1967–68		Traditional
Birdman	40	US	1967–68	Birdman and the Galaxy Trio	Traditional
Galaxy Trio	20	US	1967–68	Birdman and the Galaxy Trio	Traditional
Spider-Man	52	US	1967–70		Traditional
Fantastic Four	20	US	1967–68		Traditional
Colargol	53	France	1967–74		Stop Motion
Reksio	65	Poland	1967–88		Traditional
Perman	54	Japan	1967–68		Anime
Tom Slick	17	US	1967	From George of the Jungle	Traditional
Mightor	36	US	1967–68	Moby Dick and Mighty Mightor	Traditional
Moby Dick	18	US	1967–68	Moby Dick and Mighty Mightor	Traditional
Super Chicken	17	US	1967	From George of the Jungle	Traditional
Super President	30	US	1967		Traditional
Spy Shadow	30	US	1967	Backup for Super President	Traditional
Aquaman	36	US	1967		Traditional
Green Lantern	3	US	1967	Segment of Aquaman	Traditional
Hawkman	3	US	1967	Segment of Aquaman	Traditional
Justice League of America	3	US	1967	Segment of Aquaman	Traditional
Teen Titans	3	US	1967	Segment of Aquaman	Traditional
The Atom	3	US	1967	Segment of Aquaman	Traditional
The Flash	3	US	1967	Segment of Aquaman	Traditional
Johnny Cypher in Dimension Zero	131	US; Japan	1967–68		Traditional
Trumpton	13	UK	1967		Stop Motion
The Adventures of Hijitus	69	Argentina	1967		Traditional
Professor Balthazar	59	Croatia	1967		Traditional
Mach Go Go Go (Speed Racer in the U.S.)	52	Japan	1967		Anime
Princess Knight	52	Japan	1967–68		Anime
Ogon Bat	52	Japan	1967		Anime
Gokū no Daibōken	39	Japan	1967		Anime
Pyun Pyun Maru	26	Japan	1967–70	The last 14 episodes aired from December 29, 1969 to March 30, 1970	Anime
Kaminari-Bôya Pikkari-Bî	53	Japan	1967		Anime
Bôken Gaboten-Jima	39	Japan	1967		Anime
Bôken Shônen Shadar	156	Japan	1967		Anime
Donkikko	21	Japan	1967		Anime
Chibikko Kaiju Yadamon	26	Japan	1967		Anime
Oraa Guzura Dado	52	Japan	1967		Anime
Skyers 5	12	Japan	1967		Anime

== 1968 ==
Title	Episodes	Country	Year	Notes	Technique
Fantastic Voyage	17	US	1968		Traditional
The Batman/Superman Hour	34	US	1968–69	Compilation series	Traditional
The Archie Show	34	US	1968–70		Traditional
Mézga család	39	Hungary	1968–78		Traditional
Cyborg 009	26	Japan	1968		Anime
GeGeGe no Kitaro	65	Japan	1968–69		Anime
Kaibutsu-kun	48	Japan	1968–69		Anime
Star of the Giants	182	Japan	1968–71		Anime
The Adventures of Batman	34	US	1968–69		Traditional
The Adventures of Gulliver	17	US	1968–69		Traditional
Arabian Knights	18	US	1968–69		Traditional
Roland and Rattfink	17	US	1968–71		Traditional
The Three Musketeers	18	US	1968–69	Segment of The Banana Splits Adventure Hour	Traditional
Micro Ventures	4	US	1968	Segment of The Banana Splits Adventure Hour	Traditional
Wacky Races (1968)	34	US	1968–69		Traditional
Pohádky z mechu a kapradí	39	Czech	1968–79		Traditional
The Banana Splits Adventure Hour	31	US	1968–70	Also live action	Traditional; Live Action
The New Adventures of Huckleberry Finn	20	US	1968–69	Also live action	Traditional; Live Action
The Herbs	13	UK	1968		Stop Motion
Les Shadoks	156	France	1968–73		Traditional
Sasuke	29	Japan	1968		Anime
Animal 1	27	Japan	1968		Anime
Akane-chan	26	Japan	1968		Anime
Yôkai Ningen Bem	26	Japan	1968		Anime
Sabu to Ichi Torimono Hikae	52	Japan	1968–69		Anime
Wanpaku Tankentai	35	Japan	1968		Anime
Yuuyake Banchō	156	Japan	1968		Anime
Fight Da!! Pyûta	26	Japan	1968		Anime
Dokachin	26	Japan	1968		Anime
Musti	156	Belgium	1968		Traditional

== 1969 ==
Title	Episodes	Country	Year	Notes	Technique
Attack No. 1	104	Japan	1969–71		Anime
Dororo	26	Japan	1969		Anime
Himitsu no Akko-chan	94	Japan	1969–70		Anime
Happy Merry-Go-Round	50	USSR (1-23 episodes); Russia (24-50 episodes)	1969–2001		Traditional
Well, Just You Wait!	20	USSR (1-16 episodes); Russia (17-20 episodes)	1969–2017		Traditional
Marine Boy	78	Japan	1969–70		Anime
Judo Boy	26	Japan	1969		Anime
Hot Wheels	17	US	1969–71		Traditional
Here Comes The Grump	17	US	1969–70		Traditional
Kamui the Ninja	26	Japan	1969		Anime
Sazae-san	8,880	Japan	1969–present	Currently the longest-running animated television series in the world.	Anime
Tiger Mask	105	Japan	1969–71		Anime
Moomin	117	Japan	1969–72		Anime
Clangers (1969)	26	UK	1969–72		Stop Motion
Hattytown Tales	39	UK	1969–73		Stop Motion
Zen-chan Tsū-chan	78	Japan	1969–70		Anime/Live-Action
Chigley	13	UK	1969		Stop Motion
Mary, Mungo and Midge	13	UK	1969		Traditional
Cattanooga Cats	9	US	1969–71		Traditional
Around the World in 79 Days	17	US	1969–71	Part of Cattanooga Cats	Traditional
It's the Wolf!	25	US	1969–71	Part of Cattanooga Cats	Traditional
Motormouse and Autocat	34	US	1969–71	Part of Cattanooga Cats	Traditional
The Strange adventures of Koziołek Matołek	26	Poland	1969–71		Traditional
Tip en Tap	26	Belgium	1969–73		Traditional
Porwanie Baltazara Gąbki	13	Poland	1969–70		Traditional
What Should I Do?	5	US	1969–70		Traditional
The Pink Panther Show	190	US	1969–80	Package series	Traditional
Sobakasu Pucchî	162	Japan	1969–70		Anime
Pinch to Punch	156	Japan	1969–70		Anime
Mōretsu Atarō	90	Japan	1969–70	Adapted from the manga by Fujio Akatsuka	Anime
Roppa Yabure Kun	110	Japan	1969		Anime
The Smokey Bear Show	17	USCanadaJapan	1969–71		Traditional
The Genie Family	52	Japan	1969–70	Later spawned a franchise with two spin-offs and one sequel series.	Anime
Otoko Ippiki Gaki Daishô	156	Japan	1969–70		Anime
Umeboshi Denka	26	Japan	1969		Anime
Skyhawks	18	US	1969–71		Traditional
The Ant and the Aardvark	17	US	1969–72		Traditional
Dastardly and Muttley in Their Flying Machines	17	US	1969–70	Spin-off of Wacky Races	Traditional
The Hardy Boys (1969)	17	US	1969		Traditional
Sabrina, The Teenage Witch	33	US	1969–70		Traditional
Scooby-Doo, Where Are You!	25	US	1969–70		Traditional
Sesame Street	4,736	US	1969–present		Traditional/Flash/CGI/Stop Motion/Live-action
