= Musti =

Musti may refer to:

== Places and jurisdictions ==
- Musti (Tunisia), a historical city and bishopric, presently a Catholic titular see, in northern Tunisia
- Musti in Numidia, also called Musti Numidiae, a historical city and bishopric, presently a Catholic titular see, in modern Algeria

== Fiction ==
- Musti (character), a cartoon character created by Flemish graphic artist Ray Goossens in 1969
  - Musti (TV series), a television series based on the character Musti

== Other ==
- Popular name for the 95 S 58-61 recoilless weapon in the Finnish Army
- Popular nickname for Mustafa
- Juan María Mujika (1963–2004), Spanish footballer nicknamed Musti
