= Sachiko Chijimatsu =

Japanese actress and narrator (born 1937)

- 千々松 幸子
- Born: Sachiko Suetsune (末常 幸子); November 30, 1937 (age 88); Fukuoka Prefecture, Empire of Japan
- Other name: Chichiko (千々子)
- Occupations: Actress; voice actress; narrator
- Years active: 1960–present
- Agent: 81 Produce

Sachiko Chijimatsu (千々松 幸子, Chijimatsu Sachiko; born Sachiko Suetsune (末常 幸子, Suetsune Sachiko) on November 30, 1937) is a Japanese actress, voice actress and narrator from Fukuoka Prefecture, Japan.

She is best known for her roles as Pyonkichi in The Gutsy Frog, Tamako Nobi in Doraemon, Cub in Sally the Witch, Shippona in The Secret of Akko-chan, and 001/Ivan Whiskey in Cyborg 009.

She had been previously affiliated with Aoni Production and Production Baobab, but has been affiliated with 81 Produce as of 2013.

== Career ==
Chijimatsu was born on November 30, 1937. She graduated from Kyoritsu Women's Junior and Senior High School.

Ever since she was a young girl, she had a deep love for acting, and joining a children's theater group only got her to become more deeply hooked into it.

She wanted to become a news announcer, but gave up on the idea after being told it was impossible because of her distinctive voice.

In 1960, during her time as a student at the Tokyo Announcing Academy, Chijimatsu started doing radio work and other activity fields after she had made an appearance in a television commercial.

She started her career as a voice actress after she was introduced by a Toei Animation producer. Her anime television series debut was Cub in Sally the Witch. While voicing Cub, she wound up causing trouble for the staff, as she struggled to lip-sync with the animation on-screen and thought about quitting.

Chijimatsu was formerly a founding member of Tokyo Artist Pro and Aoni Production, but played a huge role in establishing Production Baobab with Kei Tomiyama, Kōsei Tomita, and Kenichi Ogata. After working with Production Baobab and Arts Vision, she joined her current affiliation 81 Produce on October 21, 2013.

She voiced Tamako Nobi in the Doraemon franchise for 26 years. She stepped down in March 2005 when the anime was rebooted with a new voice cast, with the role of Tamako being taken over by Kotono Mitsuishi. Before she stepped down from the role, she made a guest appearance on the Waratte Iitomo! segment "A World You Think You Know, But Don't Really" with Noriko Ohara, Kazuya Tatekabe, Miina Tominaga, Mari Shimizu, and Akira Kamiya.

When voicing Pyonkichi on The Gutsy Frog, she had previously voiced gentle and lovely female characters in foreign film dubs, so when she initially started, she ended up breaking down in tears, saying, "I can't say such rough lines."

Her family consists of her husband and their two children. Her first child, a son, was born while she was on Tiger Mask. During her pregnancy, her co-stars would often tease her, asking, "Is the baby in your belly talking?" After the birth of her son, her voice ended up changing and she struggled getting it back to how it sounded before. Her second child, a daughter, was born in 1979. Doraemon began broadcasting shortly after the birth of her daughter, so Chijimatsu developed a very strong, deep, and personal attachment to portraying mother characters.

In 1978, she joined the Cosmos Tanka Society and in 1994, joined the Sanbashi Association. She published a poem collection titled Space Mist in 2002.

In 2016, Chijimatsu received the Lifetime Achievement Award at the 10th Seiyu Awards.

== Personality ==
Her personal hobbies and special skills include haiku, tanka, reading, shigin, and traveling.

She went on record saying that had she not become a voice actress, she would have worked in research relating to her father's work.

=== Features/Characteristics ===
Her voice type ranges from a "lively alto" to a "cute and lively mezzo-soprano".

While she has voiced female and animal roles, she is also relatively known for her young boy roles.

== Filmography ==
=== Television animation ===
List of voice performances in television animation
Year	Title	Role	Notes	Source
1966	Sally the Witch	Cub	Debut anime voice role	
1968	GeGeGe no Kitarō	Ōguchi Onna, Tomiko	Ep. 3	
1969	Attack No. 1	Fukuda, Inomata		
1969	Sobakasu Pucchi	Pucchi	Lead role	
1969	Tiger Mask	Akko, Asako, Chibiru, Choppy, Jimmy, Taro Takata, Yoko Takaoka	Substitute voice of Yoko Takaoka	
1969	The Genie Family	Kan-chan's Friend's Brother, Kendo Club Member, Substitute for Harenchi		
1969	The Secret of Akko-chan	Shōshō Akatsuka, Shippona, Major General, Chibita	First voice of Shippona	
1969	Mōretsu Atarō	Additional voice		
1969	Pinch to Punch	Pinch	Lead role	
1969	Moomin	Sorry-oo		
1970	Star of the Giants	Additional voice		
1970	Maco the Mermaid	Haruko Hayashi		
1971	Apache Yakyūgun	Additional voice		
1971	Kunimatsu-sama no Otoridai	Additional voice		
1971	GeGeGe no Kitarō	Additional voice		
1971	Andersen Stories	Mary/Lily, Garbo, Ellen	Mary/Lily in Episodes 27–29, Garbo in Ep. 34, Ellen in Ep. 41	
1971	Sarutobi Ecchan	Miko		
1971	Lupin the 3rd Part I	Delivery Person	Ep. 8	
1972	Akado Suzunosuke	Additional voice		
1972	Triton of the Sea	Moya		
1972	Gatchaman	Yamori		
1972	Saban's Adventures of Pinocchio	Boy		
1972	Genshi Shōnen Ryū	Additional voice		
1972	The One Who Loves Justice: Moonlight Mask	Additional voice	Ep. 20	
1972	The Gutsy Frog	Pyonkichi		
1972	Chappy the Witch	Jun		
1972	New Moomin	Sorry-oo		
1973	Dororon Enma-kun	Yano child, Kyūsuichō Child	Yano child in Ep. 6, Kyūsuichō Child in Ep. 10	
1973	Babel II	Additional voice		
1973	Microid S	Shizuko Kōchi	Eps 6-26	
1973	Miracle Girl Limit-chan	Gū		
1973	Little Wansa	Mimi, Wansa's mother		
1974	Space Battleship Yamato	Kikuko Tokugawa (Tokugawa's wife), Saori Shima (Shima's mother)	Ep. 10	
1974	Calimero	Deppa		
1974	Cutie Honey	Twin Panther 1		
1974	Great Mazinger	Haruna Shiratori		
1974	Getter Robo	Kazuko Saotome, Saori Hoshino	Kazuko Saotome in Ep. 20	
1974	First Human Giatrus	Additional voice		
1974	Megu the Little Witch	Apo Kanzaki		
1974	Mazinger Z	Hitomi Aozora	Ep. 63	
1975	Getter Robo G	Girl, Lisa		
1975	Steel Jeeg	Chie		
1975	Time Bokan	Prince		
1975	The Adventures of Maya the Honey Bee	Mother Bee, Mother Butterfly, Mother Snail, Bee Larvae, High-Ranking Official		
1975	Kum-Kum	Toru Toru		
1976	Candy Candy	Jimmy		
1976	Go-wapper 5 Godam	Norisuke Kawaguchi		
1976	Combattler V	Kosuke Kita		
1976	3000 Leagues in Search of Mother	Julieta		
1976	Paul's Miraculous Adventure	Keisuke, Otsu-chin, Jan, Tonky, Andy		
1976	UFO Warrior Dai Apolon	Matsuo	Main role	
1976	Little Lulu and Her Little Friends	Alvin Jones		
1976	Robokko Beeton	Mother	Second voice	
1976	Magne Robo Gakeen	Aya Kitami		
1977	Rascal the Raccoon	Mick		
1977	Ikkyū-san	Additional voice		
1977	Ippatsu Kanta-kun	Acne, Boy A, Buckteeth, Rumi's Mother, Hideo		
1977	New Star of the Giants	Additional voice		
1977	Yatterman	Hiyowakamaru		
1978	Nobody's Boy: Remi	Additional voice		
1978	Space Pirate Captain Harlock	Cassandra	Eps 25-26	
1978	Her Majesty's Petite Angie	Richard, Chin, Tommy		
1978	The Adventures of the Little Prince	Irene, Hector		
1978	Magical Girl Tickle	Pochi		
1978	Song of Baseball Enthusiasts	Female Office Worker		
1979	The Adventures of Marco Polo	Tim		
1979	Cyborg 009	001/Ivan Whiskey	Main role	
1979	Doraemon	Tamako Nobi	Main role	
1979	The Rose of Versailles	Shop Owner		
1980	The Monster Kid	Snow Boy, Additional voices		
1980	Astro Boy	Naoto		
1980	Dora・Q・Perman	Tamako Nobi	Television special	
1980	The White Whale of Mu	Rei Shiratori (Reina)		
1980	The Littl' Bits	Napoleon aka "Snagglebit"		
1981	New Gutsy Frog	Pyonkichi	Main role	
1981	Ohayō! Spank	Baron		
1981	Ninja Hattori-kun	Additional voice		
1982	Game Center Arashi	Takashi Tanaka	Ep. 6	
1982	Pro Golfer Saru	Komaru	Television special	
1983	Galactic Drifter Vifam	Jimmy Eril		
1984	Panzer World Galient	Jojo	As a baby in Ep. 1	
1984	Fuku-chan	Hiroshi-kun		
1989	Let's Go! Anpanman	Maimai Mama, Beni Shoga Mama, Queen Pearl	First voice of Maimai Mama and Beni Shoga Mama	
1990	Let's Go! Anpanman: Save the Southern Sea!	Lost Maimai	Television special	
1991	Chimpui	Wakenai		
1991	The Two Lottes	Ms. Leitner	Ep. 14	
1998	Galactic Drifer Vifam 13	Jimmy Eril		
2009	Sergeant Keroro	Keroro's mother	Eps 262 and 313	
2010	K-On!	Tomi Ichimonji	Eps 9, 15, 25	
2011	Fractale	Granny Elder	Eps 3-6, 8-9, 11	
2012	Phi Brain: Puzzle of God	Tane	Ep. 12	
2013	Free!	Grandma	Season 2	

=== Theatrical animation ===
List of voice performances in theatrical animation
Year	Title	Role	Notes	Source
1968	Sally the Witch	Turnip		
1970	Remi the Little Boy and Capi the Notorious Dog	Dolce		
1970	The Kindly Lion	Muku-muku	1998 re-dub	
1971	Animal Treasure Island	Pub		
1972	Sarutobi Ecchan	Additional voice		
1972	The Three Musketeers in Boots	Little Mouse		
1972	Go Get Team 0011	Demon A		
1972	Chappy the Witch	Jun		
1974	Yaemon, The Locomotive	Mach		
1976	Puss 'n Boots Travels Around the World	Eskimo Child		
1978	Candy Candy: The Call of Spring/The May Festival	Jimmy		
1980	Doraemon: Nobita's Dinosaur	Tamako Nobi		
1981	Doraemon: The Records of Nobita, Spaceblazer	Tamako Nobi		
1981	Doraemon: What Am I for Momotarō?	Tamako Nobi	Short film	
1982	Doraemon: Nobita and the Haunts of Evil	Tamako Nobi		
1983	Doraemon: Nobita and the Castle of the Undersea Devil	Tamako Nobi		
1983	The Gutsy Frog: The Movie	Pyonkichi		
1984	Doraemon: Nobita's Great Adventure into the Underworld	Tamako Nobi		
1985	Doraemon: Nobita's Little Star Wars	Tamako Nobi		
1986	Doraemon: Nobita and the Steel Troops	Tamako Nobi		
1987	Doraemon: Nobita and the Knights on Dinosaurs	Tamako Nobi		
1988	Doraemon: The Record of Nobita's Parallel Visit to the West	Tamako Nobi		
1989	Doraemon: Nobita and the Birth of Japan	Tamako Nobi		
1990	Doraemon: Nobita and the Animal Planet	Tamako Nobi		
1991	Doraemon: Nobita's Dorabian Nights	Tamako Nobi		
1991	Dorami-chan: Wow, The Kid Gang of Bandits!	Nobihei's mother	Short film	
1992	Doraemon: Nobita and the Kingdom of Clouds	Tamako Nobi		
1993	Doraemon: Nobita and the Tin Labyrinth	Tamako Nobi		
1994	Doraemon: Nobita's Three Visionary Swordsmen	Tamako Nobi		
1995	Doraemon: Nobita's Diary on the Creation of the World	Tamako Nobi		
1996	Doraemon: Nobita and the Galaxy Super-express	Tamako Nobi		
1997	Doraemon: Nobita and the Spiral City	Tamako Nobi		
1998	Doraemon: Nobita's Great Adventure in the South Seas	Tamako Nobi		
1998	Doraemon Comes Back	Tamako Nobi	Short film	
1999	Doraemon: Nobita Drifts in the Universe	Tamako Nobi		
2000	Doraemon: Nobita and the Legend of the Sun King	Tamako Nobi		
2000	A Grandmother's Recollections	Tamako Nobi	Short film	
2001	Doraemon: Nobita and the Winged Braves	Tamako Nobi		
2001	Good Luck! Gian!!	Tamako Nobi	Short film	
2002	Doraemon: Nobita in the Robot Kingdom	Tamako Nobi		
2002	The Day When I Was Born	Tamako Nobi	Short film	
2003	Doraemon: Nobita and the Windmasters	Tamako Nobi		
2004	Doraemon: Nobita in the Wan-Nyan Spacetime Odyssey	Tamako Nobi		
2005	Pretty Cure Max Heart 2: Friends of the Snow-Laden Sky	Hinata		
2009	Kero 0: Depart! Assembly of Everyone!!	Keroro's mother	Short film	

=== Original video animation (OVA) ===
List of voice performances in original video animation
Year	Title	Role	Notes	Source
1978	Doraemon: The Fishing Pond in My Study Room	Tamako Nobi	Debut role as Tamako Nobi	
1984	Galactic Drifter Vifam: Letters from Kachua	Jimmy Eril		
1984	Galactic Drifter Vifam: The 13 Gathered	Jimmy Eril		
1985	Galactic Drifter Vifam: Missing 12	Jimmy Eril		
1985	Galactic Drifter Vifam: Kate's Memory – The Tearful Rescue Operation!!	Jimmy Eril		
1994	Doraemon: Nobita and the Future Notes	Tamako Nobi	Public education video, later released as an OVA	

=== Video games ===
- 3rd Super Robot Wars Alpha: To the End of the Galaxy (2005): Kosuke Kita

=== Drama CD ===
- Galaxy Drifter Vifam: The Drama Edition – Janus's Love Log... I Already Feel Like the Star (1984): Jimmy Eril

=== Tokusatsu ===
- Do Your Best!! Robocon (1974): Robogari (voice)
- Army of the Apes (1974): Ura (voice)

== Awards ==
Year	Award	Category	Result
2016	10th Seiyu Awards	Merit Awards	Won
