= Fuji Television Enterprise =

Japanese animation studio

Fuji Television Enterprise (Japanese:フジテレビ・エンタプライズ), was a Japanese animation studio. Founded in 1963, the studio was known as TV Douga (テレビ動画) until around 1968, when the studio went under the name "Japan Tele-Cartoons" during the export of their works.

== List of works ==
=== TV Douga era ===
- Dolphin Prince (1965)
- Uchuujin Pipi (1965)
- Kaitou Pride (Dr. Zen) (1965)
- Johnny Cypher in Dimension Zero (1967, co-production with Joe Oriolo Studios)

=== Fuji Television Enterprise era ===
- Marine Boy (1969)
- Sobakasu Pucchi (1969)
- Pinch and Punch (1969–1970)
- Itazura no Tenshi Chippo-chan (1970)
