= Ryūichi Yokoyama =

Japanese manga artist and animation director (1909–2001)

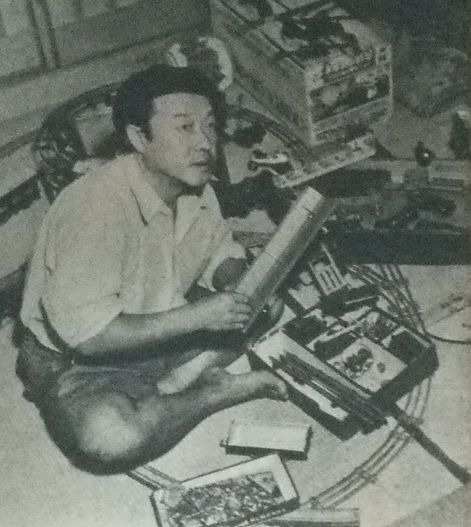
- Yokoyama Ryuichi in 1950
- Born: 17 May 1909; Kōchi, Japan
- Died: 8 November 2001 (aged 92); Kamakura, Japan
- Occupations: Manga artist, essayist, sculptor, painter
- Years active: 1936-1979
- Known for: Fuku-chan
- Relatives: Taizō Yokoyama (younger brother)

Ryūichi Yokoyama (Yokoyama Ryūichi (横山 隆一); May 17, 1909 – November 8, 2001) was a Japanese manga artist and animation director. He has created very successful yonkoma comic strips since the 1930s.

== Life ==
Yokoyama was born in Kōchi; his parents were silk wholesalers. After finishing high school, he moved to Tokyo and worked as a sculptor apprentice. He started to submit comics to magazines, and soon his works got serialized. His series Edokko Ken-chan (江戸っ子健ちゃん), created in 1936, quickly achieved great success and was the first manga to be adapted as a live-action film (1937). In the same year, the Fuku-chan (フクちゃん) spin-off came out, which became the most popular manga of its time and influenced several other artists, including Osamu Tezuka. It appeared in 5534 strips in the Mainichi Shimbun newspaper from 1936 to 1971, making it one of the longest-running Japanese comic strips. The stories focus on the little boy Fukuo "Fuku-chan" Fuchida and his experiences in kindergarten and with his family. The manga was adapted from 1982 to 1984 as a 71-episode anime television series. The character was used for propaganda during World War II, filmed in several anime, with Yokoyama being only slightly involved in the productions. After the war, Fuku-chan became the mascot of Waseda University.

His other comics include Densuke (デンスケ), which appeared in the Mainichi Shimbun from 1949 to 1955, and Peko-chan (ペ子ちゃん). For Hyaku Baku (百馬鹿), which came out from 1968 to 1970 in the magazine Manga Sunday, he received the 1979 prize from the Japan Cartoonists Association Award. He was honored again with this prize in 1992 for his life's work. In 1994 he was nominated Person of Cultural Merit.

Enthusiastic about Disney's work in the US, Yokoyama wanted to set up his own production studio after the war. For this he invested from his private fortune, which was not inconsiderable from his success as a mangaka. In 1955, Yokoyama directed the short film Onbu Obake (おんぶおばけ, Piggyback Ghost), which was performed only once in front of a special audience. The following year, Yokoyama founded his own studio, Otogi Pro. In 1957, this released the short film Fukusuke, which was based on one of Yokoyama's books. However, Yokoyama's management and directing work is described by contemporaries and employees as chaotic and the production work as craft-oriented. With veteran animator Maeda Hajime, work became more organized, with Yokoyama's role in the productions gradually fading into the background, even though he was officially credited as director.

From 1961, Otogi Pro created the first anime television series, Otogi Manga Calendar (also referred as Instant History). The 100-episode television series Dōbutsu-mura Monogatari (動物村ものがたり Tales of the Animal Village) followed in 1970. However, Yokoyama's commitment to animation films was already exhausted during the production of Otogi Manga Calendar and he turned away from the industry, leaving it to the emerging studios from 1963 onwards. In addition to comics, Yokoyama also created essays, sculptures and paintings. His younger brother was the cartoonist Yokoyama Taizō.

Yokoyama died in 2001, in Kamakura at the age of 92.

== Works ==
=== Manga ===
- 1936: Edokko Ken-chan
- 1936–1971: Fuku-chan
- 1939: Chisana Sencho-san
- 1948–1949: Peko-chan
- 1949–1955: Densuke
- 1966: Yuki
- 1968–1970: Hyaku Baku
- 1972: Waga Yūgiteki Jinsei
- 1979: Hyaku-baka

=== Film ===
- 1950: Peko-chan to Densuke
- 1955: Onbu-obake
- 1957: Fukusuke
- 1959: Hyotan suzume
- 1962: Otogi Manga Calendar (TV series)
- 1962: Otogi no Sekai Ryōko
- 1970: Dōbutsu-mura Monogatari (TV series)
