= Ray Goossens =

Belgian artist (1924–1998)

- Born: 26 October 1924; Merksem, Belgium
- Died: 10 December 1998 (aged 74); Deurne, Belgium
- Occupations: Artist, animator, film director, and writer
- Years active: 1939–1997

Ray Goossens (26 October 1924 – 10 December 1998) was a Belgian artist, animator, writer, and director best known for creating the cartoon character Musti.

== Biography ==
Ray Goossens was born in Merksem, Belgium in 1924. Interested in animation from before World War II, he founded the AFIM animation studios with Henri Winkeler and Edmond Roex. They had 15 employees, including later famous comics artists like Bob de Moor and Jef Nys. They created a number of short animated movies, of which Smidje Smee was the most successful.

After the war, Goossens started working as a comics creator with Kleine Zondagsvriend, a weekly youth magazine. He created a number of series, some based on existing stories like Tijl Uilenspiegel and Reinaert de Vos, some new like Tsjoem (a parrot) and Snops en de bende. He also worked as an illustrator for different newspapers and magazines, including Gazet van Antwerpen.

He worked as an animator mainly for client's publicity purposes, and in 1957 became artistic director of Belvision, the new animation studios of Le Lombard, one of the major Belgian comics publishers. At first, they created series based on existing comics series like Oumpah-pah, Hergé's Adventures of Tintin or Chlorophylle. They also made the full-length movie Pinocchio in Outer Space.

From 1956 to 1969 he worked as an independent animator and director. In 1967 he directed Asterix the Gaul, the first feature film based on this comic, and in 1968 he joined Dupuis, where he created with the animation studios a number of children's series like Tip en Tap, De Pili's and Musti. He also directed a series based on the adventures of Boule et Bill.

From 1976 onwards, Ray Goossens taught animation at the R.I.T.C.S in Brussels. His final success as a director followed in 1980, with Plons de gekke kikker.

Goossens died aged 74 on 10 December 1998 in Deurne.

== Filmography ==
=== As director ===
==== With AFIM ====
- 1940: Metamorfose, Rapi Roum, and Hoe primmeke ter wereld kwam
- 1941: Smidje Smee
- 1947: De lamme maakt een ritje

==== Independent work ====
- 1956: Wat 'n vader
- 1958: Paviljoen Wetenschappen for the Expo 58 (Brussels World's Fair)
- 1959: Van zilverzout tot zilverbeeld
- 1960: Van katoenbol tot filmonderlaag
- 1967: In naam der wet
- 1968: Hoera, ik ben vader!, and Er was eens

==== With Belvision Studios ====
- 1957-1964: Hergé's Adventures of Tintin
- 1960: Le bosquet hanté
- 1961: Boothill Mc Gall, sheriff and Coin-coin
- 1964: Canard à l'orange
- 1965: Spaghetti à la romaine, Oumpah-Pah, and Pinocchio in Outer Space
- 1967: Asterix the Gaul

==== With Dupuis ====
- 1968-1982: Musti (52 episodes of 5 minutes)
- 1971: Tip en Tap
- 1973: De Pili's
- 1975: Boule et Bill, and Bobo
- 1984: Trompo

==== With VRT ====
- 1990-1991: Musti (104 all-new episodes)

=== As writer ===
- 1983-1988: Plons de gekke kikker

== Awards ==
- 1956: First prize at the second Festival of the Belgian Movie, for Wat 'n vader
