= The Gutsy Frog =

Japanese manga series

- First tankōbon volume cover

ど根性ガエル (Dokonjō Gaeru)
- Genre: Gag comedy
- Manga
- Written by: Yasumi Yoshizawa
- Published by: Shueisha
- Imprint: Jump Comics
- Magazine: Weekly Shōnen Jump
- Original run: July 27, 1970 – June 14, 1976
- Volumes: 27
- Anime television series
- Directed by: Eiji Okabe (1–8); Tadao Nagahama (9–103)
- Written by: Masaki Tsuji; Haruya Yamazaki; Yoshiaki Yoshida
- Music by: Kenjiro Hirose
- Studio: Tokyo Movie (Note: Production assistance (制作協力) for all episodes was provided by A-Production.)
- Original network: JNN (ABC, TBS)
- English network: US: UTB
- Original run: October 7, 1972 – September 28, 1974
- Episodes: 103 (206 segments)
- Anime television series

The Gutsy Frog 2
- Directed by: Tsutomu Shibayama
- Produced by: Yasuji Takahashi (NTV); Shunzō Katō (TMS)
- Music by: Reijirō Koroku
- Studio: Tokyo Movie Shinsha (Note: Production assistance (制作協力) for all episodes was provided by Ajiado.)
- Original network: NNS (NTV)
- Original run: September 7, 1981 – March 29, 1982
- Episodes: 30 (60 segments)
- Anime film

New Gutsy Frog: The Gutsy Pillow
- Directed by: Tsutomu Shibayama
- Music by: Reijirō Koroku
- Studio: Tokyo Movie Shinsha
- Released: March 13, 1982
- Runtime: 38 minutes
- Television drama
- Directed by: Shintarō Sugawara; Shunsuke Kariyama; Shunpei Maruya; Yūma Suzuki
- Produced by: Hibiki Itō; Hidehiro Kawano; Hiroko Okura
- Written by: Yoshikazu Okada
- Music by: Hajime Sakita
- Studio: Nippon TV; AX-ON Inc.
- Original network: Nippon TV
- Original run: July 11, 2015 – September 19, 2015
- Episodes: 10
- icon

The Gutsy Frog (Japanese: ど根性ガエル, Hepburn: Dokonjō Gaeru) is a Japanese manga series written and illustrated by Yasumi Yoshizawa. It was serialized in Shueisha's shōnen manga magazine Weekly Shōnen Jump from July 1970 to June 1976, with its chapters collected in 27 tankōbon volumes. A 103-episode anime television series by Tokyo Movie was broadcast on ABC and TBS from October 1972 to September 1974; a second anime television series, titled The Gutsy Frog 2 (known in Japan as New Gutsy Frog), was broadcast on Nippon TV from September 1981 to March 1982. An anime film was released in March 1982. A ten-episode television drama aired on Nippon TV from July to September 2015.

== Premise ==
While frog Pyonkichi is hopping in an empty lot in Nerima, Tokyo's Shakujii Park, middle schooler Hiroshi trips over a rock and squashes him. However, Pyonkichi is reborn as an imprint on the front of Hiroshi's shirt and now gives him advice and commentary on his life.

== Characters ==
Pyonkichi (ピョン吉)
Voiced by: Sachiko Chijimatsu (anime), Hikari Mitsushima (drama)
A frog who is crushed by Hiroshi, but his spirit lives on as a talking frog on his shirt, becoming a "Flat Surface Frog" (平面ガエル, Heimen Gaeru). Because said shirt is Hiroshi's only good shirt, he is always forced to travel around and interact with Hiroshi. They are equally obstinate and gluttonous and are always arguing like siblings. He is capable of jumping around and forcing Hiroshi to come along with him. He possesses incredible strength, and through his arms and teeth he is able to lift extremely heavy objects. Hiroshi's mother treats Pyonkichi as her own child. Pyonkichi is attracted to females of all species, including cats, frogs, and humans. His title comes from his frequent acts of "gutsiness".
Hiroshi Kaizuka (貝塚 ひろし, Kaizuka Hiroshi)
Voiced by: Masako Nozawa
Portrayed by: Kenichi Matsuyama
The middle schooler who fell on Pyonkichi. He is never seen without his sunglasses, which he wears perched on his head. Though his school has a uniform policy, he is, for some reason, allowed to wear his one good shirt. He is not good academically or in athletics (except bowling). He frequently engages in duels with other boys, including Gorilla-Imo. Hiroshi is recognised as the class comedian due to his mischievous acts, and consequently is scolded often by his teachers. His girlfriend is Kyoko, whom he stays with most of the time. However, he still does not miss an opportunity to see other women, especially older ones. Pyonkichi and Hiroshi behave like siblings; encouraging, quarrelling, and caring deeply for each other. Married to Kyoko in the Solmac advertisement series produced by the original animators.
Kyoko Yoshizawa (吉沢 京子, Yoshizawa Kyōko)
Voiced by: Yōko Kuri (1st series), Jun Tomii (2nd series; #1–26), Kaoru Kurosu (2nd series; #27–60)
Portrayed by: Atsuko Maeda
Hiroshi's girlfriend. She is the daughter of a rather wealthy family, yet is a strong-minded girl who will stand up for herself and participate in pranks despite being kind-hearted. She initially pretends to dislike Hiroshi, but harbours feelings for him since their first encounter, as she wants Hiroshi to propose to her on their first date. Becomes friends with him after he meets Pyonkichi, whom she believes is a cute shirt design. She gets good grades in school, and her hobbies include ice skating. Kyoko does not always respond to Hiroshi's advances, especially in public, and is often linked with other boys. However, she is seen getting jealous when Hiroshi is seen with other girls; and there is a mutual understanding with Hiroshi about them dating. She spends most of her time with Hiroshi, and is married to him in the Solmac advertisement series produced by the original animators.
Gorou (五郎, Gorō)
Voiced by: Kazue Takahashi (1st series), Junko Hori (2nd series)
Portrayed by: Ryo Katsuji
Hiroshi's sidekick. Despite his diminutive size, he is actually only a year younger than Hiroshi, whom he addresses as senpai. His girlfriend is Misaka.
Imotaro Gorira (五利良 イモ太郎, Gorira Imotarō) / Goriraimo (ゴリライモ)
Voiced by: Kazuya Tatekabe (1st series), Kyūji Aozora (2nd series)
The school bully, and Hiroshi's rival for Kyoko's attention. Initially, he spends most of his time bullying others and duelling with other boys, but gradually reduces the degree of his acts. Hiroshi and Gorira become friends later on, becoming partners in numerous pranks. He loves cats, and his family business is a fish shop. In the Solmac CM, he has taken over the fish shop.
Umesaburo Sagawa (佐川 梅三郎, Sagawa Umesaburō)
Voiced by: Kazuo Harada
Portrayed by: Ken Mitsuishi
Addressed as "Ume" by everyone, he is an earnest young man who works as a sushi chef. Having grown up at the local orphanage, he cares deeply for the children there and plays Santa for them every Christmas. He is very much in love with Miss Yoshiko, which puts him at odds with Mr. Minami. At the end of the original, Yoshiko and Ume-san are linked together. Repeated acts include teasing couples while delivering sushi and subsequently getting injured, and peeping into Yoshiko's classroom with the help of a ladder.
Shinpachi Goto (後藤 新八, Gotō Shinpachi)
Voiced by: Keiko Yamamoto
The new boy at school, he is completely selfish and rude towards everyone. Umesaburo initially believes that Shinpachi's bad behavior is because his family is extremely poor, but it turns out that his family is actually rather wealthy and of high social standing.
Yoshiko Yamanaka (山中 ヨシ子, Yamanaka Yoshiko)
Voiced by: Reiko Mutō (1st series), Keiko Toda (2nd series)
Portrayed by: Yuri Shirahane
The English teacher at Hiroshi's school. Both Umesaburo and Mr. Minami are in love with her, which annoys her.
Kuniko Obayashi (大林 くに子, Ōbayashi Kuniko)
Voiced by: Eiko Masuyama
Hiroshi's childhood sweetheart. It was she who gave him the sunglasses that he wears constantly. Kuniko is a flirtatious girl who charms all the boys, saving most of her attention for Hiroshi, which, naturally, does not sit well with Kyoko.
Machida (町田)
Voiced by: Ichirō Nagai
Portrayed by: Denden
A teacher at Hiroshi's school. He references his 25 years of teaching experience in nearly every episode of the anime.
Yoshio Minami (南 よし雄, Minami Yoshio)
Voiced by: Shūsei Nakamura (1st series), Hideyuki Tanaka (2nd series)
Another teacher at Hiroshi's school. He is constantly dueling with Umesaburo for Yoshiko's affection. He is proud of his car, the Buran-go, and often offers to drive Yoshiko around in it.
Mrs. Kaizuka
Voiced by: Noriko Ohara (1st series), Shō Saitō (2nd series)
Portrayed by: Hiroko Yakushimaru
Hiroshi's long-suffering mother. Because Hiroshi's father is deceased, she is the money earner for the family, working as a tailor and seamstress out of the modest home where she and Hiroshi live.

== Media ==
=== Manga ===
Written and illustrated by Yasumi Yoshizawa, The Gutsy Frog was serialized in Shueisha's shōnen manga magazine Weekly Shōnen Jump from July 27, 1970, to June 14, 1976. Shueisha collected its chapters in 27 tankōbon volumes, released from February 28, 1971, to October 9, 1976.

=== Anime ===
A 103-episode anime television series (consisting of two segments of 15 minutes each), produced by A Production, Tokyo Movie, and Asahi Broadcasting, was broadcast on ABC and TBS from October 7, 1972, to September 28, 1974.

Another 30-episode anime television series (also consisting of two segments of 15 minutes each), titled The Gutsy Frog 2 or New Gutsy Frog (新・ど根性ガエル, Shin Dokonjō Gaeru), was broadcast on Nippon TV from September 7, 1981, to March 29, 1982. An anime film, titled Shin Dokonjō Gaeru: Dokonjō Yumemakura (新・ど根性ガエル ど根性夢枕; "New Gutsy Frog: The Gutsy Pillow"), premiered on March 13, 1982.

The original anime series aired in the United States on United Television Broadcasting (UTB) in 2014.

=== Other media ===
In 2013, an American TV-movie remake of The Gutsy Frog was reported to be in development, presumably as a pilot for a new TV series. The pilot film was to contain both live action and CGI animation and to feature a cast including Frankie Jonas, Maxwell Perry Cotton, and Mischa Barton.

A live-action dorama version of the story premiered in Japan in July 2015 on Nippon Television. The series is set in 2015 Japan and features a grown-up Hiroshi and Kyoko and a computer-generated Pyonkichi. The cast included Kenichi Matsuyama as Hiroshi and former AKB48 singer Atsuko Maeda as Kyoko.

A sequel manga, written and drawn by Yasumi's daughter Yuuko Ootsuki in collaboration with Sanrio, was released on August 5, 2016. Titled Dokonjō!! Kero Kero Keroppi (ど根性!! けろけろけろっぴ), it is about Hiroshi's daughter Hiroko and Keroppi in a situation similar to that involving Hiroshi and Pyonkichi.

== Reception ==
In 2005, Japanese television network TV Asahi conducted a "Top 100" nationwide survey; The Gutsy Frog placed 100th. In 2006, TV Asahi conducted an online poll for the top one hundred anime, and The Gutsy Frog placed 56th in the "Celebrity List". In 2013, animator Masaaki Yuasa recommended among other anime, The Gutsy Frog, highlighting episodes 145 and 146.
