= List of King Leonardo and His Short Subjects episodes =

Episodes of the 1960s television cartoon King Leonardo and His Short Subjects, listed by segment and season.

== The King and Odie ==
All cartoons follow a two-part format, with (for example) the first half in "Riches To Rags" and the conclusion in "Nose For The Noose." However, the final four cartoons ("S.O. Essex Calling," "The Big Falling Out," "Long Days Journey Into Fright" and "Making A Monkey Shine") form a four-part storyline.

The following cartoons originally aired on King Leonardo And His Short Subjects:

1. Riches To Rags
2. Nose For The Noose
3. Drumming Up The Bongos
4. How High Is Up?
5. Royal Amnesia
6. Loon From The Moon
7. Dim Gem
8. The Big Castle Caper
9. Duel To The Dearth
10. Ringside Riot
11. Trial Of The Traitors
12. Battle Slip
13. Paris Pursuit
14. The Awful Tower
15. The Sport Of Kings
16. Black Is White
17. Fatal Fever
18. Pulling The Mane Switch
19. The King And Me
20. The Loves Of Lynetta Lion
21. Heroes Are Made...With Salami
22. The Big Freeze
23. Debased Ball
24. Bats In The Ballpark
25. Sticky Stuff
26. Am I Glue
27. True Blue Blues (appears in syndicated Dudley Do Right And Friends show #2727)
28. My Dog Has Fleas (appears in syndicated Dudley Do Right And Friends show #2728)
29. The Legend of Leonardo The Neat
30. Home Neat Home
31. Perfume Panic
32. Style Awhile
33. Lead Foot Leonardo (appears in syndicated Dudley Do Right And Friends show #2729)
34. The Rat Race (appears in syndicated Dudley Do Right And Friends show #2730)
35. Long Lost Lennie
36. Ghosts Guests
37. The Obey Ball (appears in syndicated Dudley Do Right And Friends show #2731)
38. Out Of The Depths (appears in syndicated Dudley Do Right And Friends show #2732)
39. Double Trouble
40. Switcheroo Ruler
41. No Bong Bongos
42. The Ad Game
43. If At First You Don't Succeed (appears in syndicated Dudley Do Right And Friends show #2735)
44. Try, Try Again (appears in syndicated Dudley Do Right And Friends show #2736)
45. The Loco Play (appears in syndicated Dudley Do Right And Friends show #2733)
46. Romeo And Joliet (appears in syndicated Dudley Do Right And Friends show #2734)
47. Long Laugh Leonardo (appears in syndicated Dudley Do Right And Friends show #2737)
48. He Who Laughs Last (appears in syndicated Dudley Do Right And Friends show #2738)
49. Beatnik Boom
50. Call Out The Kids
51. Royal Bongo War Chant
52. Showdown At Dhyber Pass - NOTE: episodes after this were produced by Gamma Productions.
53. East Side, West Side
54. Coney Island Calamity
55. An Ode In Code
56. Two Beneath The Mast
57. Hunting A Hobby
58. Teeing Off
59. The Tourist Trade
60. Bye Bye Bicycle
61. Back To Nature
62. My Vine Is Your Vine
63. Fortune Feller
64. Wild And Wobbly
65. Smarty Gras
66. Bayou Blues
67. Hip Hip Hypnosis
68. Odie Hit The Roadie
69. Bringing In Biggie
70. Confound It Confusion
71. Uranium On The Cranium
72. Mistaked Claim
73. The Trail Of The Lonesome Mine
74. The Treasure Of Sierra Bongo
75. Stage Struck
76. One Way Ticket To Venus
77. Chicago Shenanigans
78. Loop The Loop

The following cartoons were first aired during the 1963–1964 season on Tennessee Tuxedo and His Tales, and are syndicated as part of Dudley Do-Right and Friends. The Dudley Do Right And Friends syndicated episode number follows each title in parentheses.

1. Introducing Mr. Mad (2701)
2. Falling Asleep (2702)
3. Hup-2-3-Hike (2703)
4. Spring Along With Itch (2704)
5. Left Alone Leonardo (2705)
6. A Tour de Farce (2706)
7. Get 'Em Up Scout (2707)
8. The King Camps Out (2708)
9. Offensive Defensive (2709)
10. A Long Long Trail A-Binding (2710)
11. Treasure Train (2711)
12. Handcar Heroes (2712)
13. Honey Hungry (2713) (misidentified as "Honey Business" on Tennessee Tuxedo and His Tales: The Complete Collection DVD case and booklet)
14. Bye Bye Bees (2714)
15. The Royal Race (2715)
16. The Shifty Sail (2716)
17. Asleep on the Deep (2717)
18. An Ace for a King (2718)
19. Odie Takes a Dive (2719)
20. Go and Catch a Falling King (2720)
21. Royal Rodeo (2721)
22. Ride 'em Cowboy (2722)
23. S.O. Essex Calling (Part 1 of 4) (2723)
24. The Big Falling Out (Part 2 of 4) (2724)
25. Long Days Journey Into Fright (Part 3 of 4) (2725)
26. Making A Monkey Shine (Part 4 of 4) (2726)

(The Columbia Pictures theatrical cartoons Midnight Frolics, Tito's Guitar, Fiesta Time, The Carpenter, Cat-Nipped and Dog, Cat And Canary have been erroneously included in previous episode lists. A selection of Columbia cartoons appeared in early NBC telecasts of King Leonardo And His Short Subjects, and were a holdover from the network's run of Hanna-Barbera's Ruff And Reddy. Despite this, these erroneous Columbia titles appear to be part of the series' official records and are even used to identify certain cartoons in episode descriptions for King Leonardo And His Short Subjects on AOL's In2TV.)

== Tooter Turtle ==
"Tooter Turtle" cartoons were repeated on Tennessee Tuxedo and His Tales, replacing "The Hunter" at the start of the 1964–1965 season. "Tooter Turtle" later resurfaced on The Dudley Do-Right Show, which aired Sunday mornings on ABC-TV from April 27, 1969 to September 6, 1970 ("Tooter" does not appear in the syndicated Dudley Do Right And Friends). The cartoons are also part of the current U.S. syndicated versions of King Leonardo And His Short Subjects and Tennessee Tuxedo and His Tales. The number following each cartoon title refers to the syndicated Tennessee Tuxedo episode in which that cartoon appears.

1. Two Gun Turtle (*Fast On The Flaw) (*subtitle not shown on screen) (901, 946)
2. Tailspin Tooter (Plane Failure) (902, 947)
3. Sea Haunt (*Follow The Fish) (*subtitle not shown on screen) (903, 948)
4. Highway Petrol (Road Block-Head) (904, 949)
5. Knight Of The Square Table (905, 950)
6. Mish-Mash-Mush (Panting For Gold) (906, 951)
7. The Unteachables (The Lawless Years) (907, 952)
8. Kink Of Swat (Babe Rube) (908, 953)
9. One Trillion B.C. (Dinosaur Dope) (909, 954)
10. Olimping Champion (Weak-Greek) (910, 955)
11. Stuper Man (Muscle-Bounder) (911)
12. Buffaloed Bill (Custard's Last Stand) (912)
13. Moon Goon (Space Head) (913)
14. Robin Hoodwink (Thimple Thief) (914)
15. Steamboat Stupe (Captains Outrageous) (915)
16. Souse Painter (Brush-Boob) (916)
17. Railroad Engineer (Stupefied Jones) (917)
18. Quarterback Hack (Pigskinned) (918)
19. Drafthead (Overwhere?) (919)
20. Lumber-Quack (Topped) (920)
21. Jerky Jockey (Kenducky Derby) (921)
22. Fired Fireman (Hook And Batter) (922)
23. Sky Diver (Jump, Jerk, Jump!) (923)
24. Tuesday Turtle (Private Pie) (924)
25. Snafu Safari (Trackdown Tooter) (925)
26. Anti-Arctic (North Pole Nuisance) (926)
27. The Master Builder (Rivet Riot) (927)
28. Taxi Turtle (My Flag Is Down) (928)
29. Canned Camera (Peek-A Boob) (929)
30. Muddled Mountie (One, Two, Buckle My Snowshoe) (930) ("Slowshoe Mountie" is an alternate title, possibly a working title)
31. Duck Haunter (931)
32. Bull Fright (Olay Down) (932)
33. News Nuisance (Sub Scribe) (933)
34. The Sheep Of Araby (Beau Geste Goes West) (934) ("Foreign Fleegion" is an alternate title, possibly a working title)
35. Waggin' Train (California Bust) (935)
36. Anchors Awry (Nautical Nut) (936)
37. Vaudevillain (Song And Dunce Man) (937)
38. Rod And Reeling (Field & Scream) (938)
39. The Man In The Blue Denim Suit (Hay! Hay!) (939)

== The Hunter ==
The following cartoons originally aired on King Leonardo And His Short Subjects:

1. Brookloined Bridge (appears in syndicated Dudley Do Right And Friends Show #2733)
2. Counterfeit Wants (appears in syndicated Dudley Do Right And Friends Show #2734)
3. Haunted Hunter (appears in syndicated Dudley Do Right And Friends Show #2735)
4. Fort Knox Fox (appears in syndicated Dudley Do Right And Friends Show #2736)
5. Stealing A March (appears in syndicated Dudley Do Right And Friends Show #2737)
6. Horn-A-Plenty (appears in syndicated Dudley Do Right And Friends Show #2738)
7. Concrete Crook
8. Subtracted Submarine
9. Risky Ransom
10. Unfaithful Old Faithful
11. The Armored Car Coup
12. Telephone Poltergeist
13. Sheepish Shamus
14. Rustler Hustler
15. The Case Of The Missing Muenster
16. The Great Train Robbery
17. Florida Fraud
18. The Great Plane Robbery
19. Girl Friday
20. Stamp Stickup
21. Statue Of Liberty Play
22. The Frankfurter Fix
23. The Case Of The Missing Mower
24. Fancy Fencing
25. Racquet Racket
26. Seeing Stars
27. The Elevator Escapade
28. Hula Hoop Havoc
29. The Counterfeit Newspaper Caper
30. Diamond Dither
31. Grand Canyon Caper
32. Borrowed Beachland
33. Peek-A Boo Pyramids
34. Lincoln Tunnel Caper (appears in syndicated Dudley Do Right And Friends Show #2727)
35. TV Terror (appears in syndicated Dudley Do Right And Friends Show #2728)
36. Bye Bye Bell (appears in syndicated Dudley Do Right And Friends Show #2729)
37. Time Marches Out (appears in syndicated Dudley Do Right And Friends Show #2730)
38. Fox's Foul Play (appears in syndicated Dudley Do Right And Friends Show #2731)
39. Bow Wow Blues (appears in syndicated Dudley Do Right And Friends Show #2732)

The following cartoons were first aired during the 1963–1964 season on Tennessee Tuxedo and His Tales, and are syndicated as part of Dudley Do-Right and Friends. The Dudley Do-Right and Friends syndicated episode number follows each title in parentheses. ("The Hunter" was featured as a segment on Tennessee Tuxedo during the 1963–1964 season. Repeats of "Tooter Turtle" replaced "The Hunter" on Tennessee Tuxedo and His Tales when "The Hunter" moved to The Underdog Show in 1964. "Tooter Turtle" and "The Hunter" were also featured on The Dudley Do-Right Show on ABC-TV between 1968 and 1970. "The King and Odie" appears in the syndicated Dudley Do-Right and Friends, but was not part of The Dudley Do-Right Show.)

1. Breaking In Big (2701)
2. The Bank Dicks (2702)
3. Eye On The Ball (2703)
4. Breakout At Breakrock (2704)
5. Getting The Business (2705)
6. An Uncommon Cold (2706)
7. The Pickpocket Pickle (2707)
8. Goofy-Guarding (2708)
9. The Big Birthday Blast (2709)
10. Under The Spreading Treasure Tree (2710)
11. School Days, Fool Days (2711)
12. Fall Of The House Of The Hunter (2712)
13. Oyster Stew (2713)
14. The Stolen Spoon Saga (2714)
15. Under Par (2715)
16. Chew Gum Charlie (2716)
17. Using The Ole Bean (2717)
18. The Case Of The Hunted Hunter (2718)
19. The Purloined Piano Puzzle (2719)
20. Record Rocket (2720)
21. The Hunter's Magic Lamp (2721)
22. Hunter Goes Hollywood (2722)
23. Two For The Turkey Trot (2723)
24. Captain Horatio Hunter (Part 1 of 2) (2724)
25. The Horn Of The Lone Hunter (Part 2 of 2) (2725)
26. Little Boy Blues (2726)

== Twinkles ==
1. Twinkles and the Sailboat
2. Twinkles and the Trip to China
3. Twinkles and the Bull Fight
4. Twinkles and the Airplane
5. Twinkles and the Honey Bees
6. Twinkles and the Big Fan
7. Twinkles and the Fishing Trip
8. Twinkles and the Roller Skates
9. Twinkles and the Carnival
10. Twinkles and the Bananas
11. Twinkles and the Mountain Climb
12. Twinkles and the Pirate
13. Twinkles and the Haunted House
14. Twinkles and the Horse Show
15. Twinkles and the Snow Shovel
16. Twinkles and the Rubber Raft
17. Twinkles and the Desert Rescue
18. Twinkles and the House Boat
19. Twinkles and the Leaping Robber
20. Twinkles and the Flying Saucer
21. Twinkles and the Little Boy
22. Twinkles and the Big Fish
23. Twinkles and the Swimming Pool
24. Twinkles and the Balloon
25. Twinkles and the Musical Band
26. Twinkles and the Amateur Show
27. Twinkles and the Rodeo
28. Twinkles and the Show Boat
29. Twinkles and the Boat Ride
30. Twinkles and the Climbing Shoes
31. Twinkles and the Falling Leaves
32. Twinkles and the Big Storm
33. Twinkles and the Trailer
34. Twinkles and the Bird Cage
35. Twinkles and the Soap Boat
36. Twinkles and the Game
37. Twinkles and the Parachute
38. Twinkles and the Lawnmower
39. Twinkles and the Babysitter
40. Twinkles and the Lemonade Stand
41. Twinkles and the Tractor
42. Twinkles and the Kite
43. Twinkles and the Little Girl
44. Twinkles and the Gold Mine
45. Twinkles and the Mechanical Man
46. Twinkles and the Volunteer Fireman
47. Twinkles and the Sports Car
48. Twinkles and the Missing Fish
49. Twinkles and the Birthday Party
50. Twinkles and the Toboggan
51. Twinkles and the Sheep
52. Twinkles and the Carousel

== Sources ==
- Big Cartoon DataBase
