= Musti (TV series) =

Belgian children's television series

- Genre: Children; Education
- Created by: Ray Goossens
- Directed by: Ray Goossens (1968 series); Werner Jacquet (2007 series)
- Starring: Rachel Frederix
- Music by: Al Van Dam (1968 series); Luc Smets (2007 series)
- Country of origin: Belgium
- Original language: Dutch
- No. of seasons: 3
- No. of episodes: 156

Production
- Animator: Ray Goossens
- Running time: 5 minutes

Original release
- Network: BRT
- Release: 1968 – 2007

Musti is a Flemish animated children's television series created by Ray Goossens. It first aired in 1968, but new episodes have been made over the decades in more sophisticated animation, even going to 3D animation from 2007 on.

== Concept ==
Musti is a small childlike anthropomorphic cat. He lives with his parents and friends Mr. Rabbit, Miss Tortoise/Mrs. Turtle, Miss Hedgehog and Mr. Dog. The stories are simple tales, usually not longer than five minutes in length. The show's target audience are preschoolers.

In total, 156 episodes have been made, airing in Belgium, the Netherlands, Canada, Turkey, Japan, Portugal, and 18 other countries.

In 2007, a new television series has been created. Instead of the flat 2D images with a white background, the new series is entirely rendered in 3D. The new series airs in Belgium, The Netherlands, Israel, Norway, Japan, Poland, South Korea, China, Croatia, Portugal and the United States on BabyFirst TV. Al-Jazeera also airs the series throughout the Arabic world.

The original narrator was Rachel Frederix. Since 2007, her successor is Kristel Van Craen.

In the Netherlands, Musti appeared on television in 1980. The narrators were Arnold Gelderman and Marijke Merckens. The series was shown on BabyFirst TV in the United States.

In France, Belgium and Canada, the narrator since 2007 was Emmanuelle Delchambre.

== See also ==
- Miffy
- Hello Kitty
