= Instant History =

Japanese television series

- Genre: Documentary
- Anime television series
- Directed by: Ryūichi Yokoyama; Shinichi Suzuki (assistant); Michihiro Matsuyama (assistant)
- Studio: Otogi Production
- Original network: Fuji Television
- Original run: May 1, 1961 – February 24, 1962
- Episodes: 312
- Anime television series

Otogi Manga Calendar
- Directed by: Ryūichi Yokoyama; Shinichi Suzuki (assistant); Michihiro Matsuyama (assistant)
- Studio: Otogi Production
- Original network: TBS
- Original run: June 25, 1962 – July 4, 1964
- Episodes: 54

Instant History (インスタントヒストリー), also known as Otogi Manga Calendar (おとぎマンガカレンダー) was a black and white Japanese anime series that aired from 1961 to 1964. It is the oldest anime television series next to Astro Boy.

== Story ==
The show was about historical events through a character who was not aware of "what happened on this day in history". Sometimes photographs and film footage were mixed in with the animations to explain what historical event had taken place. The research archives came from the newspaper where the director's Fuku-chan manga was printing at the time.

== Production ==
The series began in 1961 as a series of 3 minute shorts that comprised a mix of animation, film footage and stills taken from the research archives of Mainichi Shinbun. Director Ryūichi Yokoyama's Fuku-chan manga was running in the newspaper at the time. This first series was broadcast as Instant History on Fuji TV and was sponsored by Meiji Seika. The series was then recycled into Otogi Manga Calendar which was broadcast on Tokyo Broadcasting System in 1962 and was sponsored by Kirin Company. Parts of the series are also found in Knowledgeable University which was broadcast on Mainichi Broadcasting System in 1966.

Season	Japanese Name	English Name	First Aired	Last Aired
Season 1	インスタントヒストリー	Instant History	May 1, 1961	February 24, 1962
Season 2	おとぎマンガカレンダー	Otogi Manga Calendar	June 25, 1962	July 4, 1964

== See also ==
- History of Anime
