= List of Free! episodes =

Cover of first Blu-ray Disc volume featuring main protagonist Haruka Nanase.

Free! is a 2013 anime series based on the light novel High Speed! written by Kōji Ōji and published the same year. Haruka Nanase and Rin Matsuoka are both gifted swimmers who are friends, but fierce rivals in the pool. Their lives and the lives of their friends are chronicled as they compete alongside and against one another from elementary school through high school. The third season has Haruka swimming at university and Rin being trained by a professional coach. Both face new challenges as they balance their personal lives against the demands of pro-sports and the task of growing into young adulthood.

The first season, titled Free! - Iwatobi Swim Club outside of Japan, was produced by Kyoto Animation and directed by Hiroko Utsumi with series composition by Masahiro Yokotani, character designs by Futoshi Nishiya, sound direction by Yota Tsuruoka and script writer, Masahiro Yokotani. The series aired 12 episodes between July 4 and September 26, 2013, on Tokyo MX and later aired on ABC, BS11 and TV Aichi. The series was streamed with English subtitles by Crunchyroll. A second season, Free! - Eternal Summer, aired 13 episodes between July 2 and September 24, 2014, and was simulcast by Crunchyroll and Funimation. An original video animation episode was included with the seventh Blu-ray Disc and DVD volume released on March 18, 2015. A third season, Free! - Dive to the Future, premiered on July 11, 2018.

For the first season, the opening theme is "Rage On" by Oldcodex, and the ending theme is "Splash Free" by Style Five (Nobunaga Shimazaki, Tatsuhisa Suzuki, Tsubasa Yonaga, Daisuke Hirakawa and Mamoru Miyano). The ending theme for episode 12 is "Ever Blue" by Style Five. For the second season, the opening theme is "Dried Up Youthful Fame" by Oldcodex, and the ending theme is "Future Fish" by Style Five. The ending theme for episode 13 is "Clear Blue Departure" by Shimazaki, Suzuki, Yonaga, Hirakawa, Miyano, Yoshimasa Hosoya, Kōki Miyata and Kenjiro Tsuda. For the third season, the opening theme is "Heading to Over" by Oldcodex, and the ending theme is "Gold Evolution" by Style Five.

== Series overview ==
Season	Episodes	Originally released	
Season	Episodes	First released	Last released
1	12	July 4, 2013	September 26, 2013
2	13 + OVA	July 2, 2014	September 24, 2014
3	12 + OVA	July 11, 2018	September 26, 2018

== Episode list ==
=== Iwatobi Swim Club (2013) ===
No. overall	No. in season	Title	Directed by	Written by	Original release date
1	1	"Reunion at the Starting Block!"; Transliteration: "Saikai no Sutātingu Burokku!" (Japanese: 再会のスターティングブロック！)	Hiroko Utsumi	Masahiro Yokotani	July 4, 2013
Second-year high school students, Haruka Nanase and Makoto Tachibana, run into first-year transfer student, Nagisa Hazuki, a fellow team member at a local swim club when they were children. The trio sneaks into their old pool building to dig up a time capsule they buried when they are reunited with Rin Matsuoka, the fourth member of their former team who left during middle school to study in Australia. Rin is rude to them, immediately challenging Haruka to a race. They nearly face off until discovering the pool is empty. The following evening, the trio meets with Rin's younger sister, Gou Matsuoka, who informs them that Rin now attends Samezuka Academy. They visit the academy's luxurious nanotorium, breaking in after hours only to be discovered by Rin, who orders them out. Haruka steps out of the pool and challenges Rin to a freestyle race.
2	2	"Memories in the Distance!"; Transliteration: "Tsuioku no Disutansu!" (Japanese: 追憶のディスタンス！)	Eisaku Kawanami; Rika Ōta	Masahiro Yokotani	July 11, 2013
The following day, Nagisa suggests forming a school-based swim club to Haruka and Makoto and the three boys propose the idea to their homeroom teacher, Miho Amakata, who agrees to be their advisor as long as they find one more member and restore the school's outdoor swimming pool themselves. Believing the group can also restore Rin's old personality, Gou volunteers as team manager. Later, Makoto runs into their former coach, Goro Sasabe, who reveals that Haruka quit swimming in middle school because Rin lost a private race to him back then and voiced that he was quitting swimming altogether. Haruka, believing it his fault, also quit swimming competitively from guilt. Rin learns of the Iwatobi swim team and joins the Samezuka swim team in hopes of officially beating Haruka.
3	3	"Theoretical Dolphin Kick!"; Transliteration: "Riron no Dorufin Kikku!" (Japanese: 理論のドルフィンキック！)	Taichi Ogawa	Masahiro Yokotani	July 18, 2013
Nagisa tries to recruit Rei Ryūgazaki from the track team, but is refused. He continues asking until, worn down, Rei agrees to swim on a trial basis. Gou, meanwhile, schedules a joint practice with the Samezuka team at their indoor pool where Rin gives the Iwatobi team the cold shoulder. Rei tries to avoid the time trials, but is forced to participate, revealing that he cannot swim. He nearly quits but upon seeing Haruka swim, realizes swimming can be beautiful. He eventually joins the swim club so he might learn how to swim beautifully, like Haruka, tasking Nagisa to teach him how.
4	4	"Captive Butterfly!"; Transliteration: "Toraware no Batafurai!" (Japanese: 囚われのバタフライ！)	Yoshiji Kigami	Masahiro Yokotani	July 25, 2013
The Iwatobi team trains in the refurbished Iwatobi pool using a regimen unearthed by Gou. Rei's body still refuses to move in the water but Gou insists he master the skill in the week remaining before their first tournament. Nagisa and Makoto both fail to teach Rei their signature techniques, causing Rei to blame it on their teaching methods as well as his not having proper gear. The team goes shopping where Haruka and Rin run into each other and have a tense discussion about their differing forms. Rin wants an equal race, so they decide to settle the score at the tournament. Afterwards, Haruka takes a turn at teaching Rei freestyle swimming, but also fails. Finally, Haruka admits to Rei alone that he is only compatible with freestyle, but swims it with passion. When Rei attempts the butterfly stroke, he discovers he can swim that stroke. The team is ready to race.
5	5	"Trial in Open Water!"; Transliteration: "Ōpun Wōtā de Taiken!" (Japanese: オープンウォーターで体験！)	Eisaku Kawanami	Masahiro Yokotani	August 7, 2013
Gou discovers a training regimen from a past swim club and proposes a summer training camp. Makoto suggests camping on the beach and ocean training and though Haruka expresses concern about Makoto's long-standing thalassophobia, Makoto assures him that he's fine. Coach Sasabe transports the team to the island where they discover the Samezuka Swim Team also training at a facility there. The Iwatobi regimen involves making three long-distance swimming circuits between the deserted islands of Sukishima, Oshima and Mizushima. By the end of Day One, they only complete half a circuit with Rei disappointed for lagging behind. That night, Rei secretly heads into the water to continue training but when a storm arises, he loses his kickboard and flounders, crying out for help. Makoto awakens and when he sees Rei struggling in the water, he swims out.
6	6	"No Breathing Shock!"; Transliteration: "Shōgeki no Nōburījingu!" (Japanese: 衝撃のノーブりージング！)	Rika Ōta	Reiko Yoshida	August 15, 2013
Haruka and Nagisa awaken to Makoto's shouts and follow him into the rough waters. Makoto's phobia sets in and he freezes, but is rescued by Haruka and dragged to nearby Sukishima island. Nagisa and Rei also make it there with Rei blaming himself for putting the group in danger. When the team reunites, they take shelter at the abandoned Sukishima Rest House. Rei asks Makoto about his hesitation in the water and, despite Haruka's objection, Makoto explains the origins of his thalassophobia encouraging the others to also share personal stories. The next day, they swim to the mainland and collapse on the shore, much to Gou and Ms. Amakata's confusion.
7	7	"One Style Final!"; Transliteration: "Kessen no Sutairu Wan!" (Japanese: 決戦のスタイルワン！)	Naoko Yamada	Masahiro Yokotani	August 22, 2013
Rin reveals to Aiichiro Nitori the story of his late father who aspired to become an Olympic swimmer, but died when Rin was very young. Rin adopted his father's dream, adding that Haruka is the only thing standing in his way. On the day of the tournament, Gou reveals that both Haruka and Rin are competing in neighboring lanes due to having similar qualifying times. Haruka encounters Rin at the lockers where their rivalry escalates. Rin wins the race and boasts to Haruka that he will never swim with him again.
8	8	"Revenge in the Medley!"; Transliteration: "Gyakushū no Medorē!" (Japanese: 逆襲のメドレー！)	Yasuhiro Takemoto	Masahiro Yokotani	August 29, 2013
None of the Iwatobi Swim Club members make it to the next round, but Gou reveals she secretly entered the team in the relay race event the following day, giving them one last chance to qualify for regionals. Everyone is excited, but Haruka disappears. Late in the evening, Haruka returns home to find Makoto waiting for him, asleep on the steps. After listening to the desperate phone messages left by his teammates and manager, Haruka awakens his friend and tells him he will participate in the relay. The next day, news of Iwatobi's participation in the relay reaches Rin, who attends the race.
9	9	"Hesitant Loosen Up!"; Transliteration: "Mayoi no Rūzun Appu!" (Japanese: 迷いのルーズンアップ！)	Taichi Ogawa	Reiko Yoshida	September 5, 2013
Iwatobi wins the relay, earning a place at regionals. Afterwards, Haruka tells the others how his expectations were blown by Rin's proclamation, but how he came to realize the joy of relay racing with friends again. The group celebrates by attending a local summer festival, which Rin and his friends are also attending. Wanting to keep Haruka and Rin apart, Nagisa manipulates the situation from behind the scenes. Rei follows Rin, who wanders off and who, upon arriving at his old elementary school, is seen holding back strong emotions.
10	10	"Irritated Heart Rate!"; Transliteration: "Iradachi no Hāto Reito!" (Japanese: 苛立ちのハートレイト！)	Noriyuki Kitanohara	Masahiro Yokotani	September 12, 2013
Rin's early history is seen, including how he transferred into Iwatobi elementary school and became friends with Haruka and the others, revealed his dream of becoming an Olympic champion to honor his father and convinced the swim team to enter a relay together before going to Australia. Meanwhile, Rei asks his teammates how their relationship with Rin fell apart. Haruka tells the same story Coach Sasabe told Makoto about Haruka's middle school race against Rin. Thinking it doesn't quite make sense, Rei decides to meet Rin face to face.
11	11	"Furious All-out!"; Transliteration: "Gekijō no Ōru Auto!" (Japanese: 激情のオ一ルアウト！)	Rika Ōta	Masahiro Yokotani	September 19, 2013
Rei confronts Rin and is met with hostility. Upon hearing about Rin's behavior and Rei's discouragement, the Iwatobi boys visit Rei and reassure him that he's a valued team member. At the tournament, Rin meets with Rei to calmly explain that the real reason he quit swimming in middle school was because he struggled in Australia, feeling he would never reach Olympic level but that his private race with Haruka upon his recent return to Japan had revived his love of swimming and Iwatobi's relay win had rekindled his interest in relays. Upon returning to his hotel, Rin learns that he's been taken off Samezuka's relay team because of a lack of focus towards Samezuka.
12	12	"Distant Free!"; Transliteration: "Harukanaru Furī!" (Japanese: 遙かなるフリー！)	Eisaku Kawanami	Masahiro Yokotani	September 26, 2013
Rin is so distracted that he swims poorly in his best event at tournament. He runs off, saying he's quitting swimming yet again. When the Iwatobi team overhears this and that Rin is off the Samezuka relay team, Rei confesses that they met, revealing everything Rin told him and stating his belief that all Rin really wants is to swim with his friends again. With the relay preliminaries about to occur, the group searches for Rin who is found by Haruka at their old elementary school. Initially fighting Haruka, Rin spots the phrase, "For the Team," scratched into the concrete. Rin begins to cry, admitting that all he truly wants is to swim a relay with his friends, just as they did long ago. The rest of the Iwatobi team joins them and Rei lets Rin take his place in the relay. Though they win the race, they are disqualified. Nevertheless, they feel they did the right thing.

=== Eternal Summer (2014) ===
No. overall	No. in season	Title	Directed by	Written by	Original release date
13	1	"Stormy Dive-Dash!"; Transliteration: "Arashi no Daibu Dasshu!" (Japanese: 嵐のダイブダッシュ！)	Hiroko Utsumi	Masahiro Yokotani	July 2, 2014
While the Iwatobi Swim Club struggles to recruit new members, Coach Sasabe restores the nearly demolished Iwatobi Swimming Club building into the Iwatobi Swimming Club Returns, providing the team with an indoor pool. At the start of the next school year, Haruka and the others meet Rin at Samezuka's pool for a send off event for third-year members where they compete in a freestyle relay. Rin, now captain of the Samezuka Swim Club, agrees to again race Haruka and they tie at the finish. That evening, the Iwatobi team invites Rin to their school pool, which they've filled with cherry blossoms, only for rain to ruin the surprise. The next day, Rin discovers that his childhood best friend, Sosuke Yamazaki, has transferred to Samezuka Academy.
14	2	"The Stroke of a Chance Meeting!"; Transliteration: "Kaigō no Sutorōku!" (Japanese: 邂逅のストローク！)	Haruka Fujita	Masahiro Yokotani	July 9, 2014
Rin reminisces with Sosuke, his classmate at Sano elementary school prior to Rin's transfer to Iwatobi elementary school. Sosuke tells Rin he is at Samezuka Academy in order to spend his third-year in his hometown before going pro. Meanwhile, Coach Sasabe plans a community swim festival to be held at ISC Returns and asks the Iwatobi team to come up with a main event. Haruka suggests a relay and Rin is asked to assemble a Samezuka team to swim against Iwatobi. Prior to the relay, Sosuke warns Haruka not to get in Rin's way as he pursues his Olympic dream.
15	3	"The Butterfly of Farewell!"; Transliteration: "Wakare no Batafurai!" (Japanese: 別れのバタフライ！)	Ai Yukimura	Masahiro Yokotani	July 16, 2014
Iwatobi High School holds a culture festival where the Swim Club participates in a land-based relay race against other clubs, though their victory fails to attract new members. As the group preps for the national tournament, Rei worries if it's acceptable that he only swims butterfly. Nagisa becomes concerned when Rei starts going off on "errands" after school, with the others becoming suspicious, especially when they spot Rei speaking with the track team captain. They beg him not to quit the swim team, but are happy to discover that his "errand" is taking lessons from Rin in order to learn the other swim strokes.
16	4	"The Somersault Turn of Promise!"; Transliteration: "Yakusoku no Samāsoruto Tān!" (Japanese: 約束のサマーソルトターン！)	Eisaku Kawanami	Masahiro Yokotani	July 23, 2014
Gou decides to make nutritional bento lunches for the team. When her attempts prove inedible, she compensates by putting together a tougher training regimen. Sosuke tells Rin he should give up relays in order to focus on his Olympic goal, but Rin says he can accomplish both. Despite preferring to swim individually, Sosuke asks to join Samezuka's relay team in order to find something he's missing, challenging Rin to a butterfly race to earn his spot. Admiring Sosuke's passion, Rin changes the way swimmers are selected for relays, asking only those who are serious about being in a relay team to join.
17	5	"A Resolution's Heads-Up!"; Transliteration: "Ketsui no Heddo Appu!" (Japanese: 決意のヘッドアップ！)	Taichi Ogawa	Maiko Nishioka	July 30, 2014
After his teammates notice odd behavior and insisting on sleepovers, Nagisa reveals he has run away from home, explaining that his parents insist he quit the swim club due to poor grades. Stalling for time before facing them, Nagisa and the others hide at ISC Returns to discuss the situation. Nagisa laments that he doesn't enjoy studying, having been forced to do it endlessly at his previous school. When the group spies an unknown adult approaching, Nagisa voices his true feelings to the unknown pursuer who turns out to be Ms. Amakata. With everyone's support, Nagisa is able to speak honestly with his parents who agree to allow him to stay in the swim club on condition that he work hard on both his schoolwork and his sport.
18	6	"Invincible Prime!"; Transliteration: "Muteki no Puraimu!" (Japanese: 無敵のプライム！)	Takuya Yamamura	Masahiro Yokotani	August 6, 2014
Before prefecturals, Rin and Gou pay their respects at their father's grave, where Rin gives Gou a photo of himself to put up at ISC Returns. Makoto asks Haruka to seriously compete against him in one race before they graduate high school. Despite losing said race to Haruka due to his pacing, Makoto presents a happy appearance to avoid making Haruka feel guilty. Haruka and Rin face off in the 100m freestyle, with Haruka narrowly beating Rin by a split second, bringing the first day's events to a close.
19	7	"The Crouching Start of Vindication!"; Transliteration: "Setsujoku no Kurauchingu Sutāto!" (Japanese: 雪辱のクラウチングスタート！)	Noriyuki Kitanohara	Masahiro Yokotani	August 13, 2014
The next day, Samezuka wins the relay race, though Iwatobi also qualifies for regionals. Afterwards, as Haruka and Rin are both scouted by college coaches, Rin confronts Sousuke about his recent behavior, which Sousuke avoids explaining. Haruka seems lackluster about being scouted, but Rei tells him he will always be free if he is true to himself. Thereafter, Haruka comes up with a training regimen to improve their relay times. Sousuke is seen skipping practice for unknown reasons.
20	8	"The Locomotive of a Twist!"; Transliteration: "Henkyoku no Rokomōtibu!" (Japanese: 変局のロコモーティブ！)	Ai Yukimura	Chika Ishikawa	August 20, 2014
Makoto takes a part-time job at ISC Returns, teaching children how to swim. He learns that Hayato is the younger brother of Kisumi Shigino, an old friend from junior high school. Kisumi explains that Hayato developed a fear of swimming after falling from a boat and nearly drowning. Makoto is unsuccessful with Hayato until Haruka tells him to remember his own experience of learning to swim. Makoto then teaches Hayato how to do the backstroke, which helps the boy overcome his fear. Haruka and Makoto learn from Kisumi that Sosuke is nursing an injured shoulder, but continues competing in spite of it.
21	9	"The Forming of a Slump!"; Transliteration: "Shissoku no Fōmingu!" (Japanese: 失速のフォーミング！)	Eisaku Kawanami	Masahiro Yokotani	August 27, 2014
On the day before regionals, Haruka, who is troubled about being scouted, shares a hotel elevator with Sosuke and confirms the shoulder injury for himself. At the tournament, Rin passes his heat in the 100m freestyle, but Haruka becomes overwhelmed by the pressure of performing in front of scouts and stops swimming mid-race. When Rin angrily confronts him about it, Haruka snaps, telling him he resents being told what to do. Rei, Makoto and Nagisa overhear their fight, but Haruka assures them that he will still swim in the relay.
22	10	"The Six-Beat Kick of Tears!"; Transliteration: "Namida no Shikkusu-Bīto!" (Japanese: 涙のシックスビート！)	Taichi Ogawa	Masahiro Yokotani	September 3, 2014
Rin learns that Sosuke's shoulder injury is serious and that his talk of being scouted is false. Unaware that Haruka is listening, Sosuke reveals to Rin that he has been training incessantly so he can swim with Rin again. Despite Rin's objections, Sosuke still wants to swim the relay because he'd quit swimming in the past, but after seeing how Rin handled his own defeat and redemption thanks to support from friends, he wants to do the same. Haruka asks his own team to give it their all in response to Sosuke's dedication. During the race, Sosuke's pain flares up, but Rin encourages him to keep going, leading to a showdown between Haruka and Rin, with Iwatobi winning by a fraction of a second.
23	11	"The Open Turn of Destiny!"; Transliteration: "Unmei no Nebā Tān!" (Japanese: 運命のネバーターン！)	Takuya Yamamura	Masahiro Yokotani	September 10, 2014
As both Iwatobi and Samezuka continue to train for nationals, Rei worries about Haruka, who is unable to participate in the freestyle event. Haruka is later approached by Sosuke, who tells him he must move forward so Rin can improve alongside him. Makoto and the others further unknowingly pressure Haruka by expressing their desire to help him find a dream. Things come to a head when Makoto once more presses the issue and Haruka rebukes him as a hypocrite. Makoto then reveals his untold plan to attend a university in Tokyo, leaving Haruka stunned. When Haruka secludes himself, Makoto asks Rin for help, who takes the despondent swimmer to Australia.
24	12	"A Swim-Off in a Foreign Land!"; Transliteration: "Ikyō no Suimofu!" (Japanese: 異郷のスイムオフ！)	Naoko Yamada	Masahiro Yokotani	September 17, 2014
Upon arriving in Sydney, Australia, Rin takes Haruka to a beach, where he talks about his experiences in that country before taking him to meet his home stay parents, Russell and Lori. Haruka is upset and unresponsive, due to his distress over his fight with Makoto. Upon checking into their hotel, the pair learn they must share a double bed for the night. They get through their discomfort by reminiscing about old times before falling asleep. The next day, Rin takes Haruka to the Sydney Olympic Park Aquatic Centre to swim alongside Australia's national team, reigniting Haruka's passion for swimming. Rin tells Haruka that he plans to approach his Australian coach about joining the current team. Haruka states he has also found a dream at which he can aim.
25	13	"The Eternal Summer of Beginnings!"; Transliteration: "Hajimari no Etānaru Samā!" (Japanese: はじまりのエターナルサマー！)	Ai Yukimura; Hiroko Utsumi	Masahiro Yokotani	September 24, 2014
Returning to Japan, Haruka thanks Rin and tells his teammates he will begin focusing on his dream of swimming on the global stage. Haruka and Makoto make amends and Makoto shares that he plans to become a swim coach. On the night before nationals, the group reminisces about their time together, Nagisa and Rei becoming emotional and Haruka assuring them that they will always stay connected. At nationals, Iwatobi wins their heat and takes 6th place overall. Rin makes Aiichiro Nitori Samezuka's new team captain and tells Sosuke that he'll wait for him to return to the world of swimming. The Iwatobi team buries a time capsule containing the sights they saw at nationals before joining Rin in a petal-filled pool at Samezuka. A flash forward shows Haruka and Rin facing off at the college level. End credits show Makoto and Haruka attending university in Tokyo.
26	14 (OVA)	"Forbidden All-Hard!"; Transliteration: "Kindan no Ōru Hādo!" (Japanese: 禁断のオールハード！)	Eisaku Kawanami	Masahiro Yokotani	March 18, 2015
The Iwatobi Swim Club go to Samezuka Academy's Culture Festival. In an attempt to help Haruka and Sosuke get along, the swim teams join a water gun survival game across campus with Haruka, Sosuke, Nagisa and Momotaro on one team and Rin, Makoto, Rei, and Aichiro on the other. Rin's team wins since Haruka lets himself be doused by Rin's water gun. At the end of the day, the eight boys take the time to get to know each other better. Note: This episode was released direct-to-video and was included with the 7th Blu-ray/DVD.

=== Dive to the Future (2018) ===
No. overall	No. in season	Title	Directed by	Written by	Original release date
27	0 (OVA)	"Build-Up of Early Spring!"; Transliteration: "Sōshun no Birudo Appu!" (Japanese: 早春のビルドアップ！)	Noriyuki Kitanohara	Haruna Matsuda	June 23, 2018
As the Iwatobi High School and Samezuka Academy swim teams enjoy the Cherry Blossom Festival, the Mascot Wrestling event goes awry when Iwatobi's mascot costume is found without its beak and their main wrestler goes missing. Makoto is reluctantly enlisted as a replacement wrestler for the event. Note: This episode was screened at an event on June 23, 2018 and was released to the public on the first Blu-ray/DVD on September 26, 2018.
28	1	"Sprouting Dive Start!"; Transliteration: "Mebuki no Daibu Sutāto!" (Japanese: 芽吹きのダイブスタート！)	Eisaku Kawanami	Masahiro Yokotani	July 11, 2018
Haruka, now a freshman at Hidaka University, reunites with Asahi Shiina, his former junior high school swim teammate. While competing at the Kanto Intercollegiate Newcomer Swimming Tournament, they're surprised to see Ikuya Kirishima, another junior high school comrade with whom they lost contact. Meanwhile, in Australia, Rin captures the attention of professional coach Mikhail Makarovich Nitori.
29	2	"A Promise on a Shooting Star!"; Transliteration: "Ryūsei no Puromisu!" (Japanese: 流星のプロミス！)	Shinpei Sawa	Masahiro Yokotani	July 18, 2018
Haruka recalls his junior high school friendship with Ikuya, including a promise to one day compete in a freestyle event with him, only to quit the team after Haruka has his fallout with Rin. Meanwhile, Haruka, Makoto and Asahi first encounter a dismissive Hiyori Tono, Ikuya's best friend. When Haruka runs into Ikuya after the event, he tries to apologize but Ikuya brushes him off and Hiyori interferes.
30	3	"First Swim in Another Country!"; Transliteration: "Ikoku no Fisuto Suimu!" (Japanese: 異国のフィストスイム！)	Yasuhiro Takemoto	Masahiro Yokotani	July 25, 2018
Rin meets Natsuya Kirishima, Ikuya's older brother, who is currently racing in international relays for cash prizes. Natsuya wants Mikhail to be his coach, but Mikhail says he lacks the proper muscles and that his focus seems to be elsewhere. Rin doesn't hesitate to point out Natsuya's unhealthy habits, while Natsuya teases Rin about his divided thoughts regarding certain friends. Their camaraderie leads to a race aborted by rain with Natsuya returning to Japan for Ikuya, as well as to seek out Nao Serizawa, his own close friend since junior high school.
31	4	"Interference of Loss!"; Transliteration: "Sōshitsu no Intāfea!" (Japanese: 喪失のインターフェア！)	Tatsuya Ishihara	Masahiro Yokotani	August 1, 2018
Haruka, Makoto and Asahi are waylaid by Hiyori at Shimogami University and are told that he's been entrusted with Ikuya's care and training there until Natsuya returns. A frustrated Haruka challenges Hiyori to allow a swimming race to decide things. Hiyori agrees but Makoto races instead, as both Hiyori and he specialize in the backstroke. Makoto loses, but thinks all is well until Hiyori still denies them seeing Ikuya, saying the swimmer's health is fragile and that Haruka is a negative influence.
32	5	"An Ominous Workout!"; Transliteration: "Kizashi no Wākuauto!" (Japanese: 兆しのワークアウト！)	Taichi Ogawa; Taichi Ishidate	Haruna Matsuda	August 8, 2018
During a joint practice between Iwatobi High School, Samezuka Academy, and Sofukan High School, Romio Hayahune, a new member of the Iwatobi High School Swim Club, experiences false start anxiety but overcomes it with the help of his teammates. Natsuya offers advice to Sousuke, who is worried about undergoing shoulder surgery.
33	6	"The Mermaid of the Abyss!"; Transliteration: "Shin'en no Māmeido!" (Japanese: 深淵のマーメイド！)	Naoko Yamada	Reiko Yoshida	August 15, 2018
Hiyori attempts to cheer up Ikuya by recalling memories of their early days, but ends up challenging him to stop obsessing over Haruka. Meanwhile, Misaki Kuramoto, one of Makoto's swim students, questions Haruka about why he only swims freestyle and Ryuji Azuma, a mysterious man from Hidaka University's campus, makes his move to become Haruka's private coach.
34	7	"A Solitary Medley!"; Transliteration: "Kokō no Medorē!" (Japanese: 孤高のメドレー！)	Noriyuki Kitanohara	Masahiro Yokotani	August 22, 2018
Haruka is learning new swimming strokes. Nao tells Natsuya to get serious about Ikuya and his own career. Sosuke leaves to train in Tokyo. At the College Championships, Asahi and Ikuya reconcile and, in a surprise move, Haruka appears beside Ikuya in the Individual Medley.
35	8	"Metamorphosis of the Soul!"; Transliteration: "Tamashī no Metamorufōze!" (Japanese: 魂のメタモルフォーゼ！)	Haruka Fujita	Masahiro Yokotani	August 29, 2018
Ikuya and Haruka face off in the Individual Medley, mending their junior high school rift. Hiyori and Ikuya also make amends, swimming the relay as Shimogami University teammates against Haruka's Hidaka University team. Ryuji watches, commenting that Haruka has yet to reach his full potential. Natsuya reunites with Ikuya and reveals his newfound goal of swimming on the global stage, then apologizes to Hiyori for his absence. Finally, Hiyori, with a better understanding of Haruka and confidence in his friendship with Ikuya, is comfortable seeing his friend spend time with his junior high school comrades once more.
36	9	"Interval in the Evening Calm!"; Transliteration: "Yūnagi no Intābaru!" (Japanese: 夕凪のインターバル！)	Shinpei Sawa	Haruna Matsuda	September 5, 2018
Isuzu Mikoshiba brings her high school swim team to meet older brother, Seijuro, and his college team. Upon meeting Haruka, she immediately challenges him to a freestyle race but is stopped by Seijiro. Rin returns to Japan, reuniting with his Samezuka Academy friends and reassuring them about Sosuke's health. Haruka meets Albert Volandel without realizing that he is the world's freestyle record-holder, leading to an unexpected loss in a friendly race. Makoto arrives late, having been delayed in order to take an ill Misaki home. Upon seeing Haruka's loss and Albert's enormous lead, he worries about Haruka's morale.
37	10	"The Grab Start of Hope!"; Transliteration: "Kibō no Gurabu Sutāto!" (Japanese: 希望のグラブスタート！)	Yasuhiro Takemoto	Reiko Yoshida	September 12, 2018
Rin reunites with Sosuke and learns about his recovery. Rei and Nagisa qualify for Nationals. Unable to reach Haruka for weeks, Makoto shares his worries with Rin who uses his credentials to gain access to Haruka's training camp. There, Makoto demonstrates skills noticed by Ryuji, who encourages him to consider athletic training as a career. Back in Tokyo, Makoto's student Misaki finally shows he understands the supportive nature of rivalry and Nao validates Ryuji's opinion of Makoto's skills in helping athletes both physically and mentally. Makoto then decides he wants to become a professional trainer.
38	11	"Streamline of Unity!"; Transliteration: "Shūketsu no Sutorīmurain!" (Japanese: 集結のストリームライン！)	Taichi Ishidate	Masahiro Yokotani	September 19, 2018
Rin and Haruka break from training to attend the high school National tournament, reuniting with old friends as Rei and Nagisa participate in their last races as high school students. The future of both the Iwatobi and Samezuka swim clubs seem assured. A retrospective of Rei and Nagisa is seen.
39	12	"Dive to the Future!"	Eisaku Kawanami; Taichi Ogawa	Masahiro Yokotani	September 26, 2018
The All-Japan Invitational hosts swimmers hoping to qualify for global competition. Kaede Kinjou appears in person for the first time, breaking tournament records in both his 50m and 100m freestyle heats. The Kirishima brothers race one another and find peace. Rin qualifies in his 100m butterfly heat while Haruka loses his 200m freestyle heat. Afterwards, Rin, Haruka, and Makoto share personal goals in a private moment with Haruka shouting that he will take on the world. A post-credits scene shows Haruka's swimming the following day in the 100m freestyle heat, during which he appears poised to set a new record. In the compilation film Free! Road to the World - the Dream, it is confirmed that Haruka achieved first place in his heat and thus qualified for the global competition.

== FrFr! ==
FrFr! (pronounced "Free Free") is a series of shorts included as bonuses on home release of the series.

No.	Title	Directed by	Written by	Original release date
1	"Makoto's Worries!"; Transliteration: "Makoto no Nayami!" (Japanese: 真琴の悩み)	Hiroko Utsumi	Masahiro Yokotani; Hiroko Utsumi	September 11, 2013
1	"Recruiting Members!"; Transliteration: "Buin Boshū!" (Japanese: 部員募集！)	Hiroko Utsumi	Masahiro Yokotani; Hiroko Utsumi	September 11, 2013
"Makoto's Worries!": Makoto and Nagisa try to deduce how much water it takes for Haruka to want to take off his clothes and dive into it.; "Recruiting Members!": Haruka, Makoto, and Nagisa think up ideas on how to recruit new members.
2	"A Week in the Lives of Rin and Nitori!"; Transliteration: "Rin to Nitori no Isshūkan!" (Japanese: 凛と似鳥の一週間！)	Hiroko Utsumi	Masahiro Yokotani; Hiroko Utsumi	October 9, 2013
2	"Rei's Dive Training!"; Transliteration: "Rei no Tobikomi Mō Tokkun!" (Japanese: 怜の飛び込み猛特訓！)	Hiroko Utsumi	Masahiro Yokotani; Hiroko Utsumi	October 9, 2013
"A Week in the Lives of Rin and Nitori!": Rin helps Nitori study, but is put off by his messy desk.; "Rei's Dive Training!": Rei dreams about diving.
3	"Rei, Theories, and Speedos!"; Transliteration: "Rei to Riron to Būmeran!" (Japanese: 怜と理論とブーメラン！)	Hiroko Utsumi	Masahiro Yokotani; Hiroko Utsumi	November 6, 2013
3	"The Iwatobis!"; Transliteration: "Iwatobike no Ichizoku!" (Japanese: 岩鳶家の一族！)	Hiroko Utsumi	Masahiro Yokotani; Hiroko Utsumi	November 6, 2013
3	"Distant FrFr!"; Transliteration: "Harukanaru Furi Furi!" (Japanese: 遙かなるフリフリ！)	Hiroko Utsumi	Masahiro Yokotani; Hiroko Utsumi	November 6, 2013
"Rei, Theories, and Speedos!": Nagisa, Haruka and Makoto help Rei pick out a swimsuit.; "The Iwatobis!": Rin watches the Iwatobi Swim Club parody The Inugamis.; "Distant FrFr!": The swim club is curious about Haruka's laughter.
