= Tip en Tap =

Belgian children's television series

- Tip & Tap with their uncle Fido on a DVD cover
- Created by: Ray Goossens
- Country of origin: Belgium
- No. of episodes: 26

Production
- Running time: 8 minutes

Original release
- Release: 1971 – 1971

Tip en Tap is a Belgian animated television series created by Ray Goossens and produced by the Belgische Radio en Televisie (BRT) in 1971. There were 26 episodes.

The series featured two puppies who used to get into some kind of mischief in each episode, but who were always saved by their uncle (a flying adult dog) at the last second. At the end, their uncle Fido would bring them back home to their beds and tuck them in under the sheets.

This cartoon was also very popular in Czechoslovakia, broadcast as a bedtime story (Večerníček) at 7:00 PM on ČST1. Both Czech and Slovak language versions were made. A Hungarian version also existed and was broadcast as a bedtime story (TV Maci) along with Füles Macko on MTV1.
