= Johnny Cypher in Dimension Zero =

- Genre: Action; Adventure; Science fiction
- Written by: Peter Fernandez; Sid Jacobson; Alan Riefe
- Voices of: Gene Allen; Paul Hecht; Corinne Orr; Peter Fernandez
- Composer: Setsuo Tsukahara
- Countries of origin: United States; Japan
- Original language: English
- No. of episodes: 131

Production
- Producer: Joe Oriolo
- Running time: 6 minutes
- Production companies: Warner Bros.-Seven Arts; Oriolo Film Studios; Terebi Doga; SK. Fujita Associates, Inc.; Nezu Production, Inc.; Japan Tele-Cartoons; Children's Corner, Inc.

Original release
- Network: First-run syndication
- Release: March 15, 1967 – September 6, 1968

Johnny Cypher in Dimension Zero is an American animated series originally airing from 1967 to 1968. It told the story of Johnny Cypher, a scientist who had the power to travel through space and time into different dimensions, with his companions Zena and Rhom. The series was produced by Oriolo Film Studios. and released by Warner Bros.-Seven Arts. The animation for the episodes was provided by Japanese studios.

== Staff ==
Opening credits

- Warner Bros.-Seven Arts Presents: Johnny Cypher in Dimension Zero
- Produced by: Oriolo Film Studios

Closing credits

- Japanese producer: K. Fujita Associates
- Animation coordinators: Tsuguyuki Kubo (ep87), Shiro Murata, Zenjiro Yamamoto (ep43)
- Animation by: Nezu Production, Children's Corner
- Lyrics by → Johnny Cypher song by: Marilyn Meyers
- Music by → Additional music by: Setsuo Tsukahara
- Producer: Joe Oriolo
- Associate producer: Fred Adair
- Writers: Peter Fernandez, Sid Jacobson, Alan Riefe
- Voices: Gene Allen, Paul Hecht, Corinne Orr

== DVD release ==
The complete series was released on 4-disc DVD set through Warner Archive Collection in 2019.

== Episodes ==
1. "Attack from Out of Space"
2. "Rhom, Super Criminal"
3. "The Eye of Ramapoor"
4. "The Menace of Maroo"
5. "Menace of the Flying Saucer"
6. "The Butronic Troublemaker"
7. "The Case of Mr. Mist"
8. "The Deafening Sound of Silence"
9. "Shoot-Out in Space"
10. "Ten Ton Diamond"
11. "The Shockman of Shardu"
12. "The Traitorous Dr. Flood"
13. "Barclay's Bullet"
14. "Invisible Fire Beam"
15. "Liquefier Gun"
16. "Seeds of Chaos"
17. "Forget Ray of Egghead"
18. "Johnny Cypher's Twin"
19. "Ship of Captain Krool"
20. "Zomar the Merciless"
21. "Johnny Versus Zena"
22. "The Deadly Beams"
23. "The Giant Robot"
24. "Wild Animal Hunter"
25. "Endless Zero"
26. "Everything Falls Up"
27. "Invisible Enemy"
28. "The Space Party"
29. "Johnny's Giant Friends"
30. "The Doll Invaders"
31. "The Interplanetary Olympiads"
32. "The World of Lost Men"
33. "The Crooked Radar Beam"
34. "The Crystal Cage"
35. "The Rescue of Robinson Cosmo"
36. "The Runaway Rocket"
37. "Snarl's Sinister Surprise"
38. "Stolen Space Station"
39. "The Gravity Belt Mystery"
40. "The Mutant Monsters"
41. "Song of Doom"
42. "The Robot"
43. "Zero Hour For Glenn City"
44. "Zero Vs. Nero"
45. "Gorloch Against the Universe"
46. "Mister Mist"
47. "Return of Frankenstein"
48. "The 4 Armed Man"
49. "Mad Magic of Eerin"
50. "Mystery of the Missing Plots"
51. "The Black Vapor"
52. "The Dyre Moth"
53. "8000 Degrees Fahrenheit"
54. "Multiplier Gun"
55. "The Martian Plague"
56. "The One-Inch Johnny Cypher"
57. "Gothar the Terrible"
58. "The Lost Planet"
59. "The Thing from Sea"
60. "The Torchmen"
61. "Billion Dollar Robbery"
62. "Invasion of the Shadowmen"
63. "Mission to Jandor"
64. "Monster of the Mists"
65. "Race Against Time"
66. "The Evil Eye"
67. "The Wandering World"
68. "The Red Forest"
69. "Crisis on Volcos"
70. "Rhom's Double"
71. "The Stolen Satellite"
72. "Tidal Wave of Terror"
73. "Giganticus Serum"
74. "The Abominable Snowman"
75. "The Mysterious Signal"
76. "The Tower of Majak"
77. "Dangerous Games"
78. "The Door of the Future"
79. "The Menace from Mercury"
80. "The Paper Perisher"
81. "Space Vacuums"
82. "The Man Duplicator"
83. "The Saturian Tri-lops"
84. "The Wild Blue Trap"
85. "The Fear of the Year"
86. "The Incredible Sponge Man"
87. "The Mothmen"
88. "The Planet of Little Men"
89. "Mission Miraculous"
90. "Nero's Revenge"
91. "The Circus of Terror"
92. "The Pet Collectors"
93. "Space Pirates"
94. "The Deadly Blossom"
95. "The Elusive Space Monster"
96. "Time Marches Back"
97. "Descent into Peril"
98. "Magnetic Mayhem"
99. "Rescue on the Moon"
100. "The Time Warp"
101. "Electronic Monsters"
102. "Planet of Gold"
103. "Space Prospectors"
104. "The Devil's Diamonds"
105. "Captain Nogo"
106. "Farewell Dr. Root"
107. "Peril from the Past"
108. "The Glass Giant"
109. "20,000 Dangers Under the Sea"
110. "An Element of Danger"
111. "Expedition to the Arctic"
112. "The Trap"
113. "Borgo's Beam"
114. "Terror in the Toy Shop"
115. "The Hidden Peril"
116. "The Man with the Golden Hands"
117. "Red Hot Planet"
118. "The Coreman"
119. "The Gigantic Garble"
120. "The Photo Spy"
121. "Mission of Mercy"
122. "The Quick Quake Maker"
123. "The Vultarian"
124. "Too Many Johnnies"
125. "Mysterious Meteorites"
126. "Operation Freeze"
127. "Strangest World of All"
128. "The Haunted Plant"
129. "Evil Mr. ESP"
130. "No More Dimension Zero"
131. "The Invisible Beam"
