= Sobakasu Pucchi =

Japanese anime television series

Sobakasu Pucchi (Japanese: そばかすプッチー, translated as Freckled Pucchi) is an anime broadcast on Fuji Television affiliated stations from March 31 to October 4, 1969.

== Story ==
This work, presented with a comedic touch, depicts the conflict between Pucchi, a small but strong-willed boy with a keen sense of justice, his friends Netaro (a monster) and Ganko (a bird), and Waruji, a greedy character who constantly plots various misdeeds. The series was sponsored exclusively by Meiji Dairies (now Meiji Co., Ltd.) and features the "Cup-go," a versatile vehicle capable of operating on land, at sea, and in the air, powered by milk.

== Characters ==
- Pucchi: Sachiko Chijimatsu
- Netaro: Koji Suwa
- Ganko: Hiroshi Ōtake
- Waruji: Yanami Jouji

== Production ==
- Studio: Fuji Television Enterprise
- Producer: Seitaro Kodama

== Availability ==
Sobakasu Pucchi was not rebroadcast after its original run ended.
