= Pinch to Punch =

Japanese anime television series

Pinch to Punch (Japanese: ピンチとパンチ, English: Pinch and Punch) is a gag anime that ran from September 29, 1969, to March 28, 1970, for 156 episodes. It was broadcast on Fuji TV affiliated stations and produced by Fuji Television Enterprise (formerly TV Douga).

== Synopsis ==
Pinch and Punch are two mischievous twins, often with their pig Ijibuta and their girlfriend Dotako, and their sister Chibigon.

== Characters ==
- Pinch (ピンチ) Voice: Sachiko Chijimatsu
- Punch (パンチ) Voice: unknown
- Dotako (ドタコ) Voice: unknown
- Chibigon (チビゴン) Voice: unknown
- Mamagon (ママゴン) Voice: Unknown
