= Fuku-chan =

Japanese manga series

フクちゃん
- Genre: Comedy
- Manga
- Written by: Ryūichi Yokoyama
- Published by: Asahi Shimbun
- Original run: October 1936 – 1971
- Anime television series
- Directed by: Mineo Fuji
- Music by: Hiroshi Tsutsui
- Studio: Shin-Ei Animation
- Original network: ANN (TV Asahi)
- Original run: November 1, 1982 – March 27, 1984
- Episodes: 71

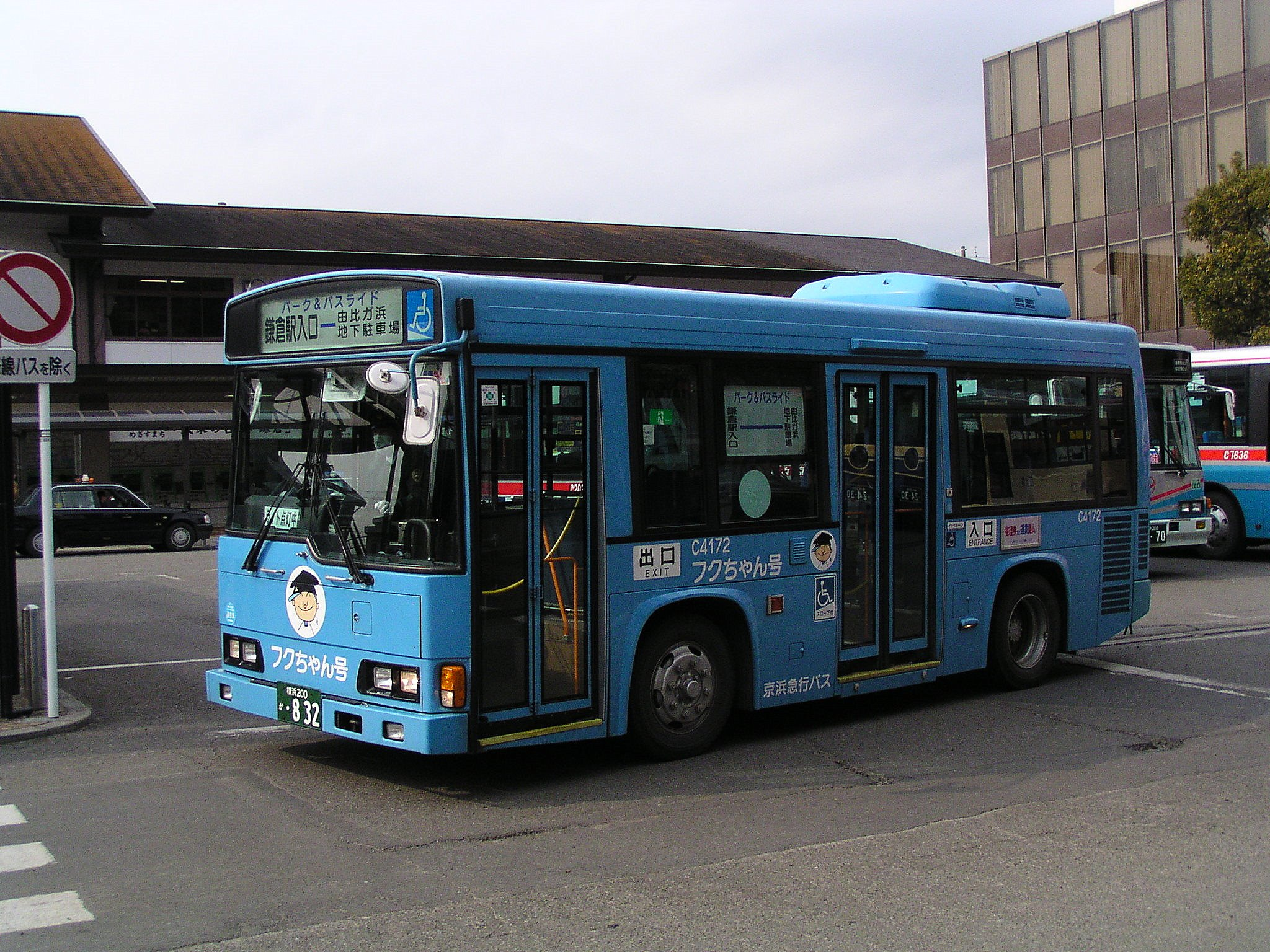
Bus depicting Fuku-chan character

Fuku-chan (フクちゃん) is a manga series by Ryūichi Yokoyama. The yonkoma series appeared in Japanese newspapers from 1936 to 1971, making it one of the longest-running Japanese comic strip series. During the Second World War, three films about Fuku-chan were made for propaganda purposes and in 1982 they were adapted into an anime television series. The character became the mascot of Waseda University.

== Synopsis ==
The series' protagonist is the five-year-old street boy Fukuo “Fuku-chan” Fuchida, who mostly plays pranks on the people around him. Recurring characters include Fuku-chan's friend Kumi, playmate Namiko and her younger brother Kiyo, the cheeky twins Doshako and Garako, and Ganchan, who always annoys the other children at preschool.

== Publication ==
The character first appeared in Yokoyama's older series Edokko Ken-chan, where he appeared several times as a mischievous street boy and soon became more popular than the main character. Therefore, the Fuku-chan series started as a spin-off in the Asahi Shimbun in October 1936. It was published throughout the war and was only discontinued in 1971. During the war, some changes were made to conform to propaganda, for example, a "Forward!" was added to the title. In the post-war period, the illustrator was reprimanded by censors for his depiction of Americans with red noses.

== Film adaptations ==
A first adaptation of the comic strip as a film was published in 1941 as Fuku-chan no Kishū. The film consisted of one reel of film and was probably a success, as the Navy Department subsequently commissioned the production of two more films that would focus on life at sea. Both propaganda films were released in 1944. The one-reel short film Uwanosora Hakase was made from a script by Yokoyama and directed by Maeda Hajime with a team of 18 over a period of eight months. It was a Navy Department co-production with Asahi Eigasha. The short film has not survived.

The second of the two films from 1944 is Fuku-chan no Sensuikan (English: "Fuku-chan's Submarine"), a five-reel work that was directed by Mochinaga Tadahito. No other people involved are known and there are conflicting reports about Yokoyama's involvement. For the production, the team was allowed to visit a naval base and a submarine and observe their crew. Some of the observations were incorporated into the film, for example in a cooking scene. A multiplane camera was constructed for production, but could only be used to a limited extent due to the general lack of material and employees.

An anime television series followed in 1982, directed by Mineo Fuji at Shin-Ei Animation. The screenplays were written by Masaki Tsuji, Toshiyuki Kashiwakura, Noboru Shiroyama and Hiroko Naka. The character design was created by Ryuichi Yokoyama. The 71 25-minute episodes were broadcast by TV Asahi from November 2, 1982, to March 27, 1984.

=== Dubbing ===
Character	Japanese dub
Fuku-chan	Chika Sakamoto
Kiyo-chan	Reiko Katsura
Kumi-chan	Yōko Kuri

=== Music ===
The TV series' music was composed by Hiroshi Tsutsui. The opening song is Boku, Fuku-chan dai! by Chika Sakamoto.
