= Musti (character) =

Cartoon character

Musti by Ray Goossens

Musti is a cartoon character, created by Flemish Belgian graphic artist Ray Goossens.

Musti is a kitten, living with his mother and father in a little house in a rural village, surrounded by a large garden with animals and trees.

== Television series ==
In 1968, Musti was developed into an animated series. In every episode, a specific story is told in a couple of minutes. The subjects are always linked to the world of small children, combining anthropomorphic animals and realistic situations. This series was first broadcast on Flemish television, with Rachel Frederix as narrator. In the Netherlands, Musti appeared on television in 1980. The narrators were Arnold Gelderman and Marijke Merckens. In the 1990s a second series was made, with a white background. In total, 156 episodes have been made, airing in two dozen countries.

In 2007, a new television series was created. Instead of flat 2D images with a white background, the new series is entirely rendered in 3D. The narrator is Kristel Van Craen. It aired in Belgium, the Netherlands, Israel, Norway, Japan, Poland, South Korea, China, Croatia, Portugal and the United States on BabyFirst TV. Al-Jazeera aired the series throughout the Arabic world.

== Books ==
The Flemish publisher Standaard Uitgeverij carries an extensive portfolio of Musti children's books, targeting children aged 3–6.

Dupuis printed a number of Musti children's comics in French, based on the character's appearances in the magazine Bonne Soirée.

Books based on the 3D series were published into different languages such as French, Arabic, Indonesian, Polish, Mandarin, Romanian, Russian, Dutch and Greek.

== Software ==
Educational software programs have been developed with Musti as the lead character developed by Stefan Bracke.

== International airings ==
- Belgium:
  - Flanders: BRT
  - Wallonia: Club RTL
- Bulgaria: Super 7
- Canada: Télétoon
- China: Youku
- France: ORTF (in the early 1970s) and France 5
- Germany: KiKA
- Hungary: Duna TV
- India: YouTube
- Israel: Arutz HaYeladim, Luli TV and Hop!
- Italy: Rai YoYo and Rai 2
- Japan: NHK, WOWOW
- Netherlands: Kindernet and NPO 1
- Norway: NRK Super
- New Zealand: TVNZ Kidzone
- Poland: TVP1
- Qatar: Baraem
- Portugal: Canal Panda and RTP2
- Romania: Boom Hop!
- Russia: Karusel and YouTube
- South Korea: Daekyo Kids TV and KBS
- Sweden: SVT Barn
- Turkey: TRT
- Ukraine: Pixel TV
- United States: BabyFirst
- Venezuela: Vme Kids

== See also ==
- Miffy
- Hello Kitty
