= Jumbo Machinder =

Toy robot

Jumbo Machinder (ジャンボマシンダー, Janbo Mashindā) is the name of a series of large-scale plastic robots sold by Bandai's character toy subsidiary, Popy in the 1970s. Although a trademarked brand name, in common usage Jumbo Machinder is often applied to any large-size robot toy roto molded out of polyethylene terephthalate (PET), a sturdy plastic also used for shampoo bottles. Jumbo Machinders are generally (but not always) 24" in height. After Popy's success with the Jumbo Machinder series, several other Japanese companies, including Takatoku, Nakajima, and Clover began producing large-size plastic robot toys as well. Several of the Jumbo Machinders were retooled for sale in the USA and Europe in the late 1970s as Shogun Warriors.

== Initial Jumbo Machinder line ==
The first Jumbo Machinder, released in 1973, was a portrayal of manga artist Go Nagai's character Mazinger Z, a fictional Super Robot. Originally planned to stand a meter (roughly three feet) tall, the toy was scaled down out of safety concerns. The Jumbo Machinder Mazinger Z sold approximately 400,000 units in its first five months in stores. The second Jumbo Machinder was Kamen Rider V3, the third Ultraman Taro, the fourth Red Baron, and the fifth Kamen Rider X. The Popy list and approximate year of release:

- 1973 Mazinger Z
- 1973 Kamen Rider V3
- 1973 Ultraman Taro
- 1973 Super Robot Red Baron
- 1974 Kamen Rider X
- 1974 Great Mazinger
- 1974 Super Robot Mach Baron
- 1974 Ultraman Leo
- 1974 Getter Robo 1
- 1974 Getter Robo 2
- 1974 Getter Robo 3
- 1975 UFO Robo Grendizer
- 1975 Spazer
- 1975 Getter Dragon
- 1975 Getter Liger
- 1975 Getter Poseidon
- 1975 Brave Raideen
- 1975 Ganbare!! Robocon
- 1976 Daikyu-Maru
- 1977 Danguard Ace
- 1977 Skyzel
- 1977 Groundzel
- 1978 Leopardon
- 1978 Tosho Daimos
- 1978 Pimer
- 1978 Godzilla
- 1982 Dragon Dol

== Jumbo Machinder Deluxe ==
Over the years, Popy Toy tinkered with the name and characteristics of the Jumbo Machinder series. In the 1976-1977 period, several characters were released under the "Jumbo Machinder Deluxe" name. Aside from the brand name change, the toys are largely identical aesthetically to their predecessors.

- Combattler V
- Daitetsujin 17
- Gaiking
- Voltes V

== Giant Robot Factory ==
For the 1979-1980 season, the Jumbo Machinders series was re-designed and re-branded as the Kyodai Robotto Kojo ("Giant Robot Factory"). Unlike their predecessors, the Giant Robot Factory toys were sold disassembled, allowing children to bolt the characters together with a simple tool provided in the package. Aside from the fact that they were sold in a disassembled manner and featured more complicated gimmicks (such as spring-loaded shooting fists), the Giant Robot Factory toys feature a very similar aesthetic to their predecessors and are considered by most collectors to be part of the same series.

Giant Robot Factory branded characters include:

- Toshi Gordian
- Daltanias
- Battle Fever Robo
- Daidenjin
- Godsigma

== Super Jumbo Machinders ==
Beginning in 1981, Popy Toy changed the name of the series to "Super Jumbo Machinder." Characters released under this brand name include:

- Tetsujin 28
- Sun Vulcan Robo
- Godmars
- Golion

== Jumbo Machinder NEO ==
A new line of modern Jumbo Machinders in debuting 2009, gearing towards adult collectors at a fairly high price. While still 22" in height, the figures will no longer be made of polyethylene, but a combination of ABS and vinyl. Only one character is produced so far.

- Shin Mazinger Z

== Kikaiju (Mechanical Beasts) ==
The "Kikaiju" (a contraction of "Mechanical" and "Monster") series of toys featured a variety of enemy characters from Mazinger Z and Kamen Rider V3. They were molded out of soft vinyl rather than PET plastic and stand only 20" in height, giving them a very different sort of aesthetic from the Jumbo Machinder toys. A total of ten Kikaiju toys were released in three waves of products. The first wave were simply large-sized soft vinyl figures. The second wave incorporated a simple pinball-style ball launcher feature. The third wave featured more complex gimmicks such as shooting discs, spears, and heads.

- Doublas M-2
- Garada K-7
- King Dan X-10
- Gelbros J-3
- Spartan K-5

== Shogun Warriors ==
American toy company Mattel acquired the rights to release several Jumbo Machinder toys in North America and Europe under the Shogun Warriors banner. With the exception of "Dragun," the early versions of which were near identical to the original Japanese version, Mattel significantly modified the Jumbo Machinder toys that they released. Several, including Gaiking and Daimos, were completely re-designed from the ground up and differ significantly from their original Japanese counterparts. Jumbo Machinders re-branded as Shogun Warriors include:

- Great Mazinger as Mazinga (later as Great Mazinga)
- Mazinger Z as Mazinga-Z (the figure was a hybrid using parts from Great Mazinger and Grendizer and was only released in Europe.)
- Gaiking
- Getter Robo G's Getter Dragon as Dragun
- Daimos
- Raideen as Raydeen
- Grendizer (only released in Europe and Canada; sold as Goldorak in France and Quebec and Goldrake in Italy)
- Astro Robot Terremoto Stellare (Only released in Italy and mostly made from parts of Raideen, Gaiking and Grendizer)
- Astro Robot Sfondamento Galattico (Only released in Italy and mostly made from parts of Raideen, Gaiking and Grendizer)
- Astro Robot Turbine Solare (Only released in Italy and mostly made from parts of Raideen, Gaiking and Grendizer)
- Astro Robot Tempesta Spaziale (Only released in Italy and mostly made from parts of Raideen, Gaiking and Grendizer)
- Godzilla
- Rodan (made exclusively for the US market)

In 2010, Toynami revived the Shogun Warriors name with a new toy line, which consists of 24-inch (550 mm) Jumbo Machinder toys. The first two robots in this line are GoLion and Dairugger XV (both of which were adapted in the Western world as Voltron). Since then figures based on Bender and Godzilla 64' have been made sporadically.

== Reissue Jumbo Machinders ==
In 2024, Bandai announced the revival of the Jumbo Machinder series with a reissue of the original Mazinger Z toy. It features several modifications to distinguish it from original releases, most notably built-in spring-loaded firing fists.

== See also ==
- Mazinger Toy Lines
