= Super Robot Chogokin =

Toy line

- Type: Robot figure
- Company: Bandai
- Country: Japan
- Availability: 2010–2017
- Materials: Plastic, die-cast metal
- Official website

Super Robot Chogokin (スーパーロボット超合金, Sūpā Robotto Chōgōkin), is Bandai's robot toy line-up diverse from the popular Soul of Chogokin franchise, first introduced in August 2010. Despite being under the Soul of Chogokin family, the major difference is the size - only scaling around 14cm. Aside from the size, the other main selling points for the line-up are the flexible articulation of the robots and added weapons set(s) (sold separately) to evoke some of the effects, memorable moves, and attacks seen in each of the robots' respective series. This toy line is mainly focused on the Super Robot series as well as the Super Sentai and Armored Core series. Just like the Soul of Chogokin, the robot figures are molded in plastic and diecast metal. Extra accessories such as bases and laboratory (such as Mazinger Z's lab) are also in the works. Super Robot Chogokin is targeted to a mature demographic, but priced lower than the Soul of Chogokin line.

== Lines ==
Number	Figure	Series	Release Date	Notes
01	Mazinger Z	Mazinger Z	2010.08	First release in the series.
02	Great Mazinger	Great Mazinger	2010.08	
03	PTX-003 Alteisen	Super Robot Wars Original Generation	2010.10	
04	Brave Reideen	Reideen The Brave	2010.12	
05	God Reideen	Reideen the Superior	2010.12	
06	Shinkenoh	Samurai Sentai Shinkenger	2011.02	First tokusatsu release in the series.
07	Gear Fighter Dendoh	Gear Fighter Dendoh	2011.03	
08	Knight Fighter Oger	Gear Fighter Dendoh	2011.03	
09	PTX-007-03c Weiß Ritter	Super Robot Wars Original Generation	2011.05	
10	GaoGaiGar	The King of Braves GaoGaiGar	2011.08	
11	Dai-Guard	Dai-Guard	2011.09	
12	Gokaioh	Kaizoku Sentai Gokaiger	2011.10	
13	Dekaranger Robo	Tokusou Sentai Dekaranger	2011.11	
14	ChoRyuJin	The King of Braves GaoGaiGar	2011.12	
15	Solar Aquarion	Genesis of Aquarion	2011.12	
16	Zeorymer	Hades Project Zeorymer	2012.02	
17	Magi King	Mahō Sentai Magiranger	2012.03	
18	Big Volfogg	The King of Braves GaoGaiGar	2012.04	
19	Shin Mazinger Z	Mazinger Edition Z: The Impact!	2012.05	
20	UCR-10/A	Armored Core V	2012.06	
21	Might Gaine	The Brave Express Might Gaine	2012.08	
22	DaiZyuZin	Kyōryū Sentai Zyuranger	2012.09	Super Robot Chogokin Daizyujin (Megazord)
23	Aquarion EVOL	Aquarion Evol	2012.10	
24	Volfogg & Big Order Room	The King of Braves GaoGaiGar	2012.12	Includes first half of Big Order Room.
25	Gurren Lagann	Gurren Lagann	2013.01	
26	Gunbuster	Gunbuster	2013.02	
27	HyoRyu / EnRyu & Big Order Room	The King of Braves GaoGaiGar	2013.04	Includes second half of Big Order Room.
28	J-Decker	Brave Police J-Decker	2013.05	
29	Grendizer	UFO Robo Grendizer	2013.06	
30	Shin Getter 1 (OVA Ver.)	Getter Robo Armageddon	2013.08	
31	Mazinkaiser	Mazinkaiser	2013.11	
32	Genesic GaoGaiGar	The King of Braves GaoGaiGar Final	2014.03	
33	Kantam Robo	Crayon Shin-chan	2014.05	
34	GaoFighGar	The King of Braves GaoGaiGar Final	2014.07	
35	Mazinkaiser Chogokin Z Color Ver.	Mazinkaiser	2014.10	
36	Getter 1	Getter Robo Armageddon	2014.11	
37	Mazinkaiser SKL	Mazinkaiser SKL	2015.03	
38	God Sigma	Space Emperor God Sigma	2015.04	
39	Mazinger Z -Kurogane Finish-	Mazinger Z	2015.08	
40	Mazinkaiser SKL Final Count Ver.	Mazinkaiser SKL	2016.02	
41	Giant Robo The Animation Version	Giant Robo: The Day the Earth Stood Still	2016.05	
42	Mazinger Z Iron Cutter Edition	Mazinger Z	2016.07	
43	Steel Jeeg	Steel Jeeg	2016.08	
44	Great Mazinger -Kurogane Finish-	Great Mazinger	2016.09	
45	Majin Emperor G	Super Robot Wars	2017.03	
46	Mazinger Zero	Shin Mazinger Zero	2017.05	

=== Accessories ===
Weapons and accessories to invoke some of the moves and attacks seen in the series

Figure	Series	Description	Release Date
Mazinger Z Weapon Set	Mazinger Z	Includes Jet Scrander, Rocket Punch Effects, Enhance Rocket Punch, etc.	2010.08
GaoGaiGar Key of Victory (Set 1)	The King of Braves GaoGaiGar	Includes Goldion Hammer and Marg Hand.	2011.08
Gokai Machine Pat Striker	Kaizoku Sentai Gokaiger	Bundled with Dekaranger Robo. Transforms Gokaioh into Deka Gokaioh.	2011.11
GaoGaiGar Key of Victory (Set 2)	The King of Braves GaoGaiGar	Includes Stealth Gao II and Gatling Driver	2012.01
Armored Core V Grind Blade	Armored Core V	Attachable weapon for the UCR-10/A.	2012.06
Otoko no Drill Set (Drill Set of Manliness)	Gurren Lagann	Drill set for Gurren Lagann. Also compatible with Gunbuster.	2013.01

=== Tamashii Japanese Web Store Exclusive ===
Figure	Series	Description	Release Date
Mazinkaiser SKL (Starter Pack)	Mazinkaiser SKL	Includes DVD of the OVA episode 1 of the series	2010.12
Mazinger Z in Wajima	Mazinger Z	A special edition for the Go Nagai Memorial Hall	2011.06
Gear Fighter Dendoh & Knight Fighter Orge Weapon Set	Gear Fighter Dendoh	All the beast sets seen in the series	2011.07
PTX-003C Alteisen Nacht	Super Robot Wars Original Generation		2011.09
GaoGaiGar Key of Victory (Set 3)	The King of Braves GaoGaiGar	Includes Dimension Pliers	2011.12
Kokubougar	Dai-Guard		2012.03
GaoGaiGar Key of Victory (Set 4)	The King of Braves GaoGaiGar	Includes ChoRyuJin SP Pack & Eraser Head XL	2012.04
Mazinger Z Devilman color	Mazinger Z / Devilman		2012.07
GekiRyuJin	The King of Braves GaoGaiGar	Can be combined with ChoRyuJin to form GenRyuJin and GouRyuJin	2012.07
Gold Solar Aquarion	Genesis of Aquarion		2012.10
Black Might Gaine	The Brave Express Might Gaine		2012.12
Hanged Man	Armored Core V		2013.02
FuuRyu / RaiRyu & Big Order Room & Victory Key	The King of Braves GaoGaiGar	Includes the Die-Cast Scale 1/1 Victory Key & 3rd part of Big Order Room	2013.06
Anti-Gurren Lagann	2nd Super Robot Wars Z		2013.06
Mazinger Z Jumbo Machinder Color	Mazinger Z		2013.07
Doryoku to Konjō no Busō Set (Effort and Guts Armament Set)	Gunbuster	Weapons and effects set for Gunbuster. Also compatible with Gurren Lagann.	2013.07
Mic Sounders the 13th & Piggy & Big Order Room	The King of Braves GaoGaiGar	Includes the ABS Scale 1/1 Victory Key & 4th part of Big Order Room with shaft	2013.08
Mazinger Z Superalloy Z color ver.	Mazinger Z		2014.02
Dynamic Option Parts Set	Getter Robo Armageddon/Mazinkaiser	Weapons and effect parts for Shin Getter 1 and Mazinkaiser	2014.04
Mazinger Z Getter Robo color	Mazinger Z/Getter Robo		2014.06
Repli GaoGaiGar & Key of Victory (Set 5)	The King of Braves GaoGaiGar Final	Includes replaceable head Dividing Driver & two Hell and Heaven effect parts	2014.11
Black Getter	Getter Robo Armageddon		2015.05
Great Mazinger Jumbo Machinder Color	Great Mazinger		2015.06
Grendizer & Spazer	UFO Robo Grendizer		2015.06
Spazer (for Grendizer)	UFO Robo Grendizer		2015.06
Genesic GaoGaiGar Hell and Heaven ver.	The King of Braves GaoGaiGar Final		2015.09
Mazinger Z Model Year 2016 (Year of the Monkey)	Mazinger Z	Asia Limited edition	2016.01
Mazinger Z Steel Jeeg color	Mazinger Z/Steel Jeeg		2016.07
Mazinger Z Hello Kitty Color	Mazinger Z		2016.09
Mazinger Z Model Year 2017 (Year of Rooster)	Mazinger Z	Asia Limited edition	2017.01
Grendizer -Kurogane Finish-	UFO Robo Grendizer		2017.04
Great Mazinkaiser			2017.10
Mazinger Z Model Year 2018 (Year of the Dog)	Mazinger Z	Asia Limited edition	2018.01
Gurren Lagann 10th Anniversary Set Ltd. Ed.	Gurren Lagann		2018.04

=== Tamashii Nation Event & Festival Event (aka - FES) Exclusive ===
Figure	Series	Release Date
Black Brave Reideen (FES 2011 Exclusive Item)	Brave Reideen	2011.07
Black God Reideen	Reideen the Superior	2011.07
GaoGaiGar The Golden Destroyer	The King of Braves GaoGaiGar	2012.10
Shin Mazinger Z Gold Version 10th Tamashii Nations World Tour Limited Ed	Mazinger Z	2017.05

=== Exclusive Mail Order Items ===
Figure	Series	Description	Release Date
Mazinger Z Mazinkaiser SKL Color Ver	Mazinger Z	Exclusive mail order with coupon from volume 1 of Mazinkaiser SKL manga	2011.07

=== Super Effect Campaign ===
This is basically a special effect part(s) for each individual mechas, but can be used with others.

Figure	Description	Release Date
Effect Part 01 - Overload	Effect part for GaoGaiGar & Gear Fighter Dendoh	2011.08
Effect Part 02 - Impact	Effect part for Dai-Guard & Reideen	2011.09
Effect Part 03 - Slash	Effect parts for Gokaioh	2011.10
Effect Part 04 - Boost	Effect part for Alteisen & Dekaranger Robo	2011.11

== See also ==
- Super Imaginative Chogokin
- Chogokin
- Godaikin
