= Reideen (disambiguation) =

Reideen may refer to:

- Reideen, a 2007 mecha anime
- Brave Reideen, a 1975 super robot anime that the above series is a remake of
- Reideen the Superior (Chouja Reideen), a 1996 sentai anime loosely based on the 1975 series
- Raydeen, the renamed Reideen robot sold as a part of Mattel's 1975 "Shogun Warriors" toyline
