= Blocker Gundan 4 Machine Blaster =

Japanese anime television series

- ブロッカー軍団IVマシーンブラスター
- Genre: Mecha
- Created by: Ashi Productions; Akira Hatta
- Directed by: Masami Anno
- Music by: Hiroshi Tsutui
- Country of origin: Japan
- Original language: Japanese
- No. of episodes: 38

Production
- Executive producer: Koichi Motohashi
- Producers: Tetsuo Ono; Hideo Adaichi
- Production companies: Nippon Animation; Ashi Productions; Fuji Television

Original release
- Network: FNS (Fuji TV)
- Release: July 5, 1976 – March 28, 1977

Blocker Gundan 4 Machine Blaster (ブロッカー軍団IVマシーンブラスター, Burokkā Gundan IV Mashīn Burasutā) is an anime series that aired from 1976 to 1977 in Japan. There are 38 episodes aired at 25 minutes each. It is also known as "Blocker Army IV Machine Blaster", "Blocker Corps IV", "Blocker Army IV", "Blocker Corps", "Machine Blaster" and in Italian as "Astro Robot contatto Ypsilon" ("Blocker Corps IV Astrorobot" for the DVD release).

== Plot summary ==
Earth is being attacked by the Mogul civilization, a super advanced people that live beneath the ocean. Professor Yuri, having studied the ancient super-technology in Astro base, anticipated such an invasion would take place. Using what he had learned of their technology, he created a team of four super robots, piloted by four youth pilots, to help repel the Mogul invasion, and they are known as the Machine Blaster Corps. Led by the pilot Ishida, the Blocker Corps stands firm against the attack of the Mogul rulers, Hellqueen V and Kaibuddha.

== Concept ==
The number 4 comes from the team of 4 robots. The robots individually have their own weapon, but they can also be combined to form a fire ring which cuts through the enemies. It was not the most popular show since anime powerhouses Gaiking and Combattler V, which featured more creative combinations and designs, were ruling the airwaves.

== Staff ==
Crew type	Crew members
Director:	Masami Anno
Original creators:	Ashi Productions; Akira Hatta (Yu Yamamoto)
Screenwriters:	Akira Hatta, Susumu Takaku, Itaru Musha, Takao Koyama, Naoko Miyake, Katsuhiko Taguchi, Sōji Yoshikawa, Hiroshi Hatta, Eiichi Okawa, Yoshitake Suzuki, Hikaru Arai, Yu Yamamoto
Designer:	Motosuke Takahashi; Kunio Okawara
Animator:	Tamotsu Tanaka; Takashi Nakamura
Music:	Hiroshi Tsutsui

== Robots ==
Pilot tag number	Pilot (Japanese)	Pilot (Italian)	Japanese 'Mashin Burastar'	Italian 'Astrorobot'	Japanese voices by	Italian voices by
Gundan I	Gensuke Ishida	Yshida	Robocles	Terremoto Stellare	Tessho Genda	Diego Reggente
Gundan II	Billy Kenjou	Ylly	Bullcaesar	Sfondamento Galattico	Masane Tsukayama	Vittorio Guerrieri
Gundan III	Jinta Hayami	Yinta	Sandaioh	Turbine Solare	Noriko Tsukase	Fabrizio Mazzotta
Gundan IV	Tenpei Asuka	Yanosh	Bosspalder	Tempesta Spaziale	Yoshito Yasuhara	Claudio Trionfi

== Opening ==
- Lyrics: "Blocker Gundan Machine Blaster" (opening theme)

== Trivia ==
- The show aired every week Monday 7:00 pm to 7:30 pm.
- It aired in The Philippines as Striker Force over RPN-9 every Friday 5:30 pm to 6:00 pm in 1979 and in Italy as Astro Robot in 1980.
- Toy maker Mattel produced Shogun Warriors figures of the Machine Blaster robots exclusively for the Italian market, recycling parts from the Shogun Gaiking, Brave Raideen and Grendizer toys and labeled as Astro Robot Shogun. These figures are considered by collectors to be the rarest figures in the entire Shogun toyline.
