= Mazinger Toy Lines =

Toys based on Mazinger franchise

Mazinger
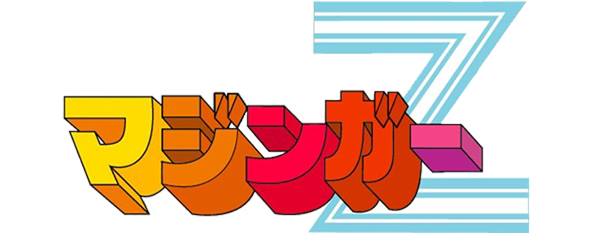
- Type: Action figures
- Invented by: Go Nagai
- Company: Bandai
- Country: Japan
- Availability: 1972–present
- Materials: Plastic
- Features: Mazinger mecha

Go Nagai's Mazinger related mechas and characters have many different toy lines, developed since Mazinger first appeared in the 1970s. Some of the most well known ones are described here.

Poppy (or Popy), a subsidiary of the Bandai Group, was the original manufacturer of the Mazinger Z action figures en the 1970s. Nowadays, Bandai's brand Tamashii Nations commercialises the Mazinger Z lines.

== Popy Jumbo Machinder ==
Popy was a classic Japanese toy maker, creator of the Chogokin line of toys, which later folded into its parent company Bandai. When it released its Jumbo Machinder line, Mazinger Z was the first character chosen for the line. They were 22-24 inch tall, moderately articulated figures made of polyethylene. Later on, Great Mazinger and Grendizer models were made, with similar characteristics. They were also introduced in North America thanks to Mattel, who rebranded the line as Shogun Warriors.

Some Mazinger Z villains, the Mechanical Beasts, were also ported to this line, though they didn't have the same format as the hero robot, being only 19-21 inches tall and made of soft vinyl. Originally intended only to be store displays, very few specimens of these evil mecha have survived and have become a coveted (and expensive) collector's item due to their rarity. At some point, it even remained unclear if some of them had ever actually been produced. The known produced models include:

- Garada K7
- Doublas M2 (labeled as Dabulas M2 or Dagulas M2)
- Grengus C3 (or Gren-Ghost C3)
- KingDan X10
- Rockron Q9 (Rokuron Q9)
- Spartan K5

Most of the models were distinctive for having variations from the original characters, specially in their color schemes and weaponry. Many of the rescued models can be seen at the Bandai Museum.

== Popy Chogokin ==
Mazinger Z GA-01 v1 figure and box reissued by Banpresto in 1999

In 1974 Popy launched a new line of die-cast metal robot and character toys. It was named Chogokin (超合金, Chōgōkin, Chō: Super, gōkin: alloy) as the fictitious material which first appeared in Go Nagai's Mazinger Z manga and anime. The first model was "GA-01" Mazinger Z and it had several versions:

1) Popy GA-01 Version 1 – 1974

2) Popy GA-01 Version 2 – 1974

3) Popy GA-01 Version 3 – 1974

4) Popy GA-01 Version 3G -

5) Popy GA-01 Version 4 – 1979

6) Bandai Version 4G Etharnal Masterpiece – 1984

7) Bandai Version 4 Etharnal Masterpiece

6) Bandai Version 4 Etarnal Heroes – 1986

7) Bandai Version 4 Etharnal Masterpiece Reissue (Based on Version 1/2 design) – with additional normal rocket punch fist.

8) Banpresto GA-01 Version 1 reissue – 1999

9) Banpresto GA-01 Version 1 reissue black – 2000

10) Bandai CGA-01/CGA-01G (Gashapon based on Version 4 design) – 2001

11) Bandai The Chogokin GT-01 (Based on Version 4) – 2003

12) Bandai The Chogokin GT-00 (Based on Version 1) – 2004

13) Version 4 Hong Kong Bootleg

14) Version 4 Korea Clover

Popy realized also a model of Hover Pilder, with the code PA-05. It seems that the versions where three, all of them realized in 1975 Later Popy realized a model of Jet Pilder, with the code PA-30.

Great Mazinger was realized with the code ga-05

Grendizer had the code ga-37. The first version had two different boxes: one for the robot and an other for the saucer. The next three versions were sold in a unique box; but all of them had some difference in the built, colors and box

== Bandai Soul of Chogokin ==
Soul of Chogokin is a popular toy line released by Bandai in 1997. Focusing mainly on classic mechas, these adult collector oriented toys are made mostly of diecast metal, with plastic parts, usually PVC or ABS. They embody the spirit of the vintage Popy and Bandai Chogokin toys of the past. The line began as Bandai was winding down their Hi-Complete Model line. The last figure in the line was meant to be Mazinger Z, but they decided to turn that prototype into the first entry of the new Soul of Chogokin line.

Among its items (that include Tetsujin 28, Gaiking, Getter Robo and Neon Genesis Evangelion) some of the most popular ones are those related to Mazinger, associated with the "GX" prefix (the "PX" prefix is from the Soul of Popynica Series). These include:

Code	Model	Released
GX-01	Mazinger Z	1997
GX-01	Mazinger Z Iron Castle Ver.	1998
GX-01B	Mazinger Z (Black version)	1998
GX-01R	Mazinger Z (Renewal Version)	2002
GX-01RB	Mazinger Z (Black Chrome Renewal Version)	2003
GX-01RG	Mazinger Z (Gold Renewal Version)	2003
GX-01X	Mazinger Hangar	2000
GX-01R+	Mazinger Z (Weathered Paint)	2008
GX-02	Great Mazinger	1998
GX-02B	Great Mazinger (Black Version)	1999
GX-02R	Great Mazinger (Renewal Version)	2002
GX-04	Grendizer	2000
GX-04B	Grendizer (Black Version)	2001
GX-04S	Grendizer King of Space Set	2002
GX-04X	Drill Spazer & Marine Spazer	2002
GX-07	Mazinger Z OVA Version	2001
GX-07I	Iron Z	2008
GX-08	Aphrodai A	2002
GX-08MA	Aphrodai A (Mazinger Angels)	2004
GX-08MAW	Aphrodai A (Snow White Version)	2005
GX-09	Minerva X	2002
GX-09MA	Minerva X (Mazinger Angels)	2004
GX-09MAB	Minerva X (La Sirene do Noir)	2006
GX-10	Boss Borot	2002
GX-10B	Boss Borot (Black Version)	2002
GX-11	Dianan A	2002
GX-11MA	Dianan A (Mazinger Angels)	2004
GX-11MAM	Dianan A (Marine Blue Mermaid)	2007
GX-12	Venus A	2002
GX-12MA	Venus A (Mazinger Angels)	2004
GX-12MAG	Venus A (Queen of Gold)	2006
GX-25	Garada K7	2004
GX-26	Doublas M2	2004
PX-01	Hover Pilder	2000
PX-01X	Mazinger Head	2000
GX-45	Mazinger Z (Edition Z)	2009
GX-45A	Mazinger Z (Atami Night Version)	2009
GX-45C	Mazinger Z (Comic Color Version)	2010
GX-47	Energer Z Restyling	2009
GX-47T	Energer Z (Test Type)	2010
GX-47N	Energer Z (Normal Color Version)	2010
GX-49	Mazinger Z (Big Bang Punch Ver.)	2009
GX-49G	Mazinger Z (Gold Version)	2010
GX-70	Mazinger Z DC	2016
GX-70VS	Mazinger Z DC vs. Devilman Options Set	2017
GX-70CN	Mazinger Z DC (Chrome Noir)	2018
GX-70SP	Mazinger Z DC (Anime Color Version)	2018
GX-70SPD	Mazinger Z (Damaged Anime Color Version)	2019
GX-73	Great Mazinger DC	2017
GX-73SP	Great Mazinger DC (Anime Color Version)	2019
GX-75	Mazinkaiser	2017
GX-75SP	Mazinkaiser (20th Anniversary Ver.)	2022
GX-76	Grendizer DC	2018
GX-76X	Grendizer DC Spazer Set	2018
GX-76X2	Grendizer Drill & Marine Spazer	2018
GX-105	Mazinger Z -Kakumei Shinka-	2022
GX-XX01	D.C. Series Compatible Secret Super Weapons Set 01	2020
DGX-01	Mazinger Z	2012
DGX-01X	Mazinger Z (Jet Scrander Set)	2013
DGX-01R	Mazinger Z (50th Anniversary Ver.)	2023
DGX-02	Great Mazinger	2015

== Fewture Models Mazinger 2001 ==
This line includes Mazinger Z, Aphrodite A ("Aflodai") and Garada K7. Promotional images including Boss Robot and Doublas M2 surfaced, but never saw release due to the cancellation of the line (Actually, these two figures finally finished trading and it is currently possible to buy them, although at a rather high price.) Released in 2001, it was meant to celebrate the 30th anniversary of Mazinger's birth. Other notable models from the same manufacturer are those related to Devilman and Getter Robo.

Designed by Taku Sato and Yasushi Nirasawa, these 12 inch models made of ABS and PVC had an exquisite level of detail, inspired in retro-styled, steampunk aesthetics, as if they had been conceived at the beginning of the 20th century, and represent a departure from the more classic representations of the robots. The Mazinger and Aphrodite models featured versions in their regular colors as well as repainted versions.

Like the Soul of Chogokin models, these were fully poseable, included a stand and several accessories. Little figurines of the pilots were among them, and Garada's pilot was Dr. Hell.

Planned for release from Fewture are the following robots:

- No.5 Boss Robot (Mazinger series)

- No.6 Doublass (Mazinger series)

- No.8 Mazinger 1969 (Mazinger series)

- No.9 Great Mazinger 1969 (Mazinger series)

Prototypes of No.5 & 6 were on site as well as renderings of the rest, but photography of these items was prohibited. Release dates for No.5 & 6 couldn't be given, though Fewture is hoping for an autumn release for No.8 & 9.

== West Kenji Figurines ==
A line of three 18 cm PVC statuettes of Sayaka Yumi, Jun Hono and Maria Fleed, showing them in their pilot suits. These figures include a stand and each character's helmet.

They have also released resin kits of both Koji Kabuto and Tetsuya Tsurugi who, like the girls, are in their pilot suits. Both of these are extremely rare as they were only sold at a special event in Japan some years ago.

== Play Ful Mazinger Z ==
As in many other countries of Latin America, Mazinger was extremely popular in Argentina in the 1980s. Because of the demand for merchandising, in 1985 toy manufacturer Play Ful obtained a license from Toei Animation to produce a line, but unlike other franchises (more popular in the U.S.), there were no moulds available to produce the toys, and so Play Ful had to develop their own. The resulting dolls were made of PVC and very fragile, but held a decent level of resemblance to the original characters, sometimes modifying the colors.

The first one to be made was Mazinger Z, and it featured launchable fists and a separate Hover Pilder. Subsequently, mechanical beasts Belgas V5, Brutus M3, Grengus C3 and Gelbros J3 were added to the line. These shared Mazinger's body but with different paint work and the particular traits of each mecha. Grengus C3 for example, didn't have fists but its characteristic black orbs, and these could be launched just like Mazinger's fists. Gelbros J3's left and right heads were fully articulated, and had claws instead of hands.

Aphrodite A was also included, and was probably the model that stranded the most from the original mecha. Her body was specially made and was completely different from the "male" mechas. She featured 3 pairs of breast missiles that could be fired thanks to a mechanism in her back. Jet Scrander was produced later, and also a Great Mazinger doll, which was a modified Mazinger Z.

Nowadays is quite difficult to obtain most of these toys in good conditions, since they were so fragile and had a number of accessories that could easily be lost.

== Revoltech Mazinkaiser ==
Revoltech is an action figure line from the Japanese company Kaiyodo. The main selling point of the line is the 'Revolver' joint, which all of the figures utilise. This gives the figures a high degree of poseability, allowing for many dynamic and varied poses. The Revoltech version of Mazinkaiser stands 12 cm tall and comes with two Kaiser Blades, a Kaiser Sword, Kaiser Scrander, and four optional hands. A display base is also included, which allows the figure to simulate a flying position.
