= Dai-Guard =

Japanese anime series

地球防衛企業ダイ・ガード (Chikyū Bōei Kigyō Dai Gādo)
- Created by: Xebec
- Anime television series
- Directed by: Seiji Mizushima
- Produced by: Makiko Iwata; Shinjiro Yokoyama
- Written by: Fumihiko Shimo
- Music by: Kohei Tanaka; Kenji Kawai
- Studio: Xebec
- Licensed by: NA: Discotek Media
- Original network: TV Tokyo
- Original run: 5 October 1999 – 28 March 2000
- Episodes: 26

Dai-Guard (地球防衛企業 ダイ・ガード, Chikyū Bōei Kigyō Dai Gādo; lit. 'Terrestrial Defense Corp. Dai-Guard') is an anime television series, produced and animated by XEBEC, and directed by Seiji Mizushima. It aired from October 5, 1999, to March 28, 2000, on TV Tokyo, running for 26 episodes. 6 volumes of videos were released on VHS and DVD. The series also had a very brief run (two episodes) on Cartoon Network through Toonami's "Giant Robot Week".

The series is based around three office workers of the 21st Century Defense Security Corporation's Public Relations Division 2 who, with the company's giant robot, Dai-Guard, fight interdimensional alien beings called "Heterodynes". Unlike most giant robot anime, Dai-Guard performs on much more realistic physics, making it heavy, slow, and difficult to control. Also, the Heterodynes seem to be the least of the 21st Century Corporation's problems as they experience opposition in the form of massive damage claims, lawsuits, rivals and a jealous and antagonistic military who wishes to take back Dai-Guard for themselves.

== Plot ==
On February 24, 2018, in the Northwest gap of the Sea of Japan, a giant creature called a Heterodyne appears and goes on a rampage, destroying a major city and killing countless people before being destroyed itself by a weapon of mass destruction known as an "O-E (Over-Explosion) bomb". In the aftermath, a giant robotic weapon system, code-named Dai-Guard, was developed for the military by the 21st Century Defense Security Corporation as an alternative to the future use of such weapons.

However, no further attacks occur for the next twelve years and the 21st Century Corporation is allowed to keep the useless weapon as a mascot which is managed by Public Relations Division 2. However, during a security exposition in 2030, a Heterodyne attacks and the ill-prepared and unarmed robot is taken into battle by its pilot Akagi Shunsuke. His headstrong nature, combined with the talents of his fellow crew, enable Dai-Guard to be victorious against multiple Heterodyne attacks causing the military to want it back.

Heterodyne are mysterious entities formed from dimensional quakes all around Japan and are attracted to electromagnetic hot spots. Crystalline hexagons called Fractal Knots act as their nucleus, and they form bodies using the matter around them. Although Fractal Knots replicate themselves indefinitely, if the original is destroyed it will immediately reduce the rest of the body into ethanol. The Heterodyne are dangerous and adaptable yet not invulnerable. They are a threat that must be faced in a dangerous world like typhoons, earthquakes or tsunami. Each one has a different physical appearance and behaviour.

Much of the series concerns the conflict between the Corporation with its office politics, profit driven, bureaucratic nature and staff beliefs, and the Anzenhosho Army (ANPO) with its adherence to protocols, procedures and concern for its public profile. Both the Corporation and the Army have people who are more concerned with ambition and status than the need to serve and protect the population. A strong theme within the story is the need for cooperation between talented individuals to achieve a common goal.

== Characters ==
Shunsuke Akagi
Voiced by: Kentarou Itou
The primary pilot of Dai-Guard. The headstrong, idealistic and impulsive, 25-year-old Akagi can be seen as the heart and brawn of the three Dai-Guard pilots. Beforehand, he was merely an office worker for the 21st Century Defense Security Corporation, but he manages to achieve his dreams of becoming a "Giant Robot pilot". During the return of the Heterodynes, he and his two friends Ibuki and Aoyama become the pilots of Dai-Guard and intend to put it to use in order to fight off the Heterodyne threat. Akagi loves his job a little too much and manages to stick out among his fellow workers as the more enthusiastic one. Akagi always has the best intentions, even though they usually get him into trouble. Intriguingly, his distinctive personality makes him a natural as Dai-Guard's primary pilot and his cartoon-samurai ethical code quickly wins him a place in the hearts of the public. He refuses to take or allow actions that will endanger civilian lives and/or property if there is any alternative whatsoever.
Ibuki Momoi
Voiced by: Akiko Hiramatsu
Years ago, during the last Heterodyne attack, Ibuki's father (a scientist whose theories predicted the appearance of the Heterodynes) was killed in the attack. Ever since that incident, Ibuki wanted revenge against the Heterodynes. She becomes the navigator of Dai-Guard for this very reason. However, she learns the less than heroic truth about her father, and it leaves her without an emotional anchor. Ibuki has a rather strained relationship with her stepfather, who at first is against Ibuki piloting Dai-Guard but becomes the person who helps her understand her father and fight her personal demons in time to save the world with much more clarity. As with Akagi, her personality meshes well with her position as Dai-Guard's navigator-she is so obsessed with details that she can make quick and precise summaries of a Heterodyne's abilities, often noticing subtle flaws in a given Heterodyne that allow the team to destroy it with minimal casualties.
Keiichiro Aoyama
Voiced by: Shinichiro Miki
Both a veritable ladies' man and somewhat mysterious, Aoyama is the engineer of Dai-Guard. Most of the time, Aoyama disappears after work, often taking off early. While his friends believe he is off womanizing, it turns out that Aoyama is caring for his sick mother, who personally does not want to become Aoyama's top priority over piloting Dai-Guard. As his experiences grow during his time piloting Dai-Guard, he meets more people from his past that he once again crosses paths with. Like his fellow pilots, he possesses personality traits that assist him in his role as Dai-Guard's engineer. Aoyama is always looking for ways to save time and effort, so not only does he regulate the robot's systems with clockwork proficiency, but he will intuitively notice methods by which the team can accomplish its goal with less effort.
Shirou Shirota
Voiced by: Kenichi Ono
An army officer who is assigned as the Tactical Advisor to the Dai-Guard team. He is originally very strict with regulations, and insistent that civilians should not be allowed to handle the Heterodyne crisis. However, his interactions with the employees of Public Relations Division 2, especially Akagi, causes him to change his views. He eventually becomes one of their biggest supporters in the army, and often risks his own career to help them.
President Ookouchi
Voiced by: Takaya Hashi
The president of 21st Century Defense Security. He was previously an army officer and was the one responsible for ordering the use of O-E Weapons during the Heterodyne attack twelve years ago. Because of this, he is determined to avoid the use of these weapons again and is thus very supportive of the Dai-Guard team. He was briefly voted out of office by the company's board of directors but was reinstated when the company began to flounder without him.
Haruo Oosugi
Voiced by: Masashi Hirose
The chief and supervisor of Public Relations Division 2. He has a very easy-going personality and is always supportive of his staff.
Shinyu Yokozawa
The aid to Chief Oosugi, who also helps oversee Dai-Guards' operations. He is married with a young daughter. As his daughter has a sickly constitution, he is often concerned with the safety of his family.
Noriko Ooyama
Voiced by: Michiko Neya
At 28, she is the oldest of the girls that work in the Public Relations Division 2 office and is seen as an older sister figure to the other employees. Her hometown of Hiroshima helps inspire her to help people, on account of what happened to the city during the War. Among the girls employed by the division, she is the most responsible. She is often concerned about the wellbeing of Akagi, and often nags him about his work and health.
Chiaki Nakahara
Voiced by: Marina Ono
Despite being the second oldest of the office girls at 25, she is very shy, easily flustered, and the shortest member of Public Relations Division 2. However, she is very dependable at doing her job, being the head of accounting for the division. She has a slight crush on Aoyama.
Fuuka Tanigawa
Voiced by: Yukari Tamura
Tanigawa is the most outgoing of the office girls and has a hyperactive personality. She is somewhat of an office gossip, often repeating dubious information heard from other parts of the company.
Shizuku Irie
Voiced by: Rumi Kasahara
Notable for her calm demeanor, Shizuku most often speaks in a low, almost emotionless, tone. However, she occasionally, and randomly, acts out various other characters' behaviors and is known for her sarcastic remarks.
Tomoyoshi Ishizuka, Tomorou Taguchi, and Hirotaka Ijyuuin
Voiced by: Shoji Izumi (Tomoyoshi), Makoto Higo (Tomorou), Katsuyuki Konishi (Hirotaka)
This trio of salary men have almost identical physical appearances and personalities; all three are overweight and easygoing. They are all 27 years old and began working for the company at the same time. As a result, they work well together. Ishizuka is in charge of the office work, Taguchi is the events planner and coordinator, and Ijyuuin is in charge of domestic public relations.
Younei Sumida
Voiced by: Hiro Yuuki
The head of Dai-Guard's ground crew, who oversees the repair and maintenance of the robot. His crew is also responsible for the construction of Dai-Guard's new parts and weapons. He is often seen assisting Prof. Domeki, who he harbors feelings for.
Rika Domeki
Voiced by: Mayumi Shintani
An eccentric 17-year-old child genius, who is the head of the Technology Division, and the company's resident scientist. She insists that others refer to her as "Professor". She is an expert on the research of Heterodynes and is also the one responsible for designing new parts for Dai-Guard. She often takes advantage of Sumida's willingness to help her.

== Mecha ==
=== Dai-Guard ===
Dai-Guard stands 25 meters high and weighs 156 tons. It is composed of multiple pieces, which were originally transported to the site of battle, and assembled on location. By Episode 20, the pieces were rebuilt as a fighter jet making up the head and arms, as well as two trucks making up the torso and legs, so that they can be much more easily transported until they can combine to form Dai-Guard. Initially it was poorly maintained and essentially mothballed due to the absence of the Heterodyne threat. With their return, Dai-Guard is recommissioned and underwent several upgrades throughout the series. Due to its configuration, pilots are required to apply for a 'vertical-model special vehicle license,' which can take a minimum of 2 months to complete. It was stated that Akagi got a score of D minus, which barely made him eligible to be Dai-Guard's main pilot. Its main weapons include:

- Rocket Punch: An improvised maneuver in which Dai-Guard's forearm is torn from its socket and thrown at the enemy.
- Drill Arm: An arm attachment that consists of a rocket-boosted oversized drill. Unfortunately, such a weapon is in reality quite impractical as it is basically a massive gyroscope and is incredibly difficult to wield due to the torque it produces. However, the pilots eventually develop the skill to make limited use of this weapon, and it is later seen in several scenarios where other weapons are unavailable.
- Net Gun: An arm attachment with the hand making up a large, weighted net used for capturing Heterodyne. Due to the lack of missions requiring the capture of live Heterodyne in the series, it is rarely ever used.
- Knot Buster: An arm attachment specifically designed by Rika Domeki to strike and destroy a Heterodyne's Fractal Knot, the weak point of the creatures. It is a claw with an integral explosive-propelled pile driver, far more practical and controllable than the Drill Arm. One simply targets the Heterodyne's Fractal Knot, latches onto it with the claw and triggers the pile driver, impaling it. This weapon was only used once by Dai-Guard before being claimed by the Army for use by its own robot, Kokubogar, but was destroyed soon afterward.
- Knot Punisher: Like the Knot Buster, it is designed to strike the Fractal Knot of the Heterodyne. Unknown to the Army, Domeki designed the Knot Buster merely as a prototype for this weapon. Where the Knot Buster is a single arm attachment, the Knot Punisher utilizes both arms. One arm utilizes the same pile driver-claw utility of the Knot Buster, but instead of an explosive charge, it is driven by a torque-less counter-rotating dual flywheel attached to the other arm. The flywheel is spun up in advance, the Heterodyne's Fractal Knot is grasped with the claw, and the flywheel is inserted into the pile driver's gear port, firing the spike and impaling the knot. The flywheel itself can be used as a melee weapon, as it is quite sturdy and possesses a greater radius than the arm and more stability than the drill arm. The downside with this system is that Dai-Guard cannot pick anything up with it in place, (aside from using the claw), and it takes a considerable amount of time to install the equipment prior to battle.
- Great Knot Punisher (Knot Punisher 2 in English Dub): The upgraded version of the Knot Punisher, developed by Domeki with the benefit of a full year of combat data. Though it has far greater power than its predecessor, the real advantage of this system is that both arms retain hands. The pile driver attachment has twice the length of both previous systems so as to accommodate a claw on one end and a hand on the other. It can be spun on its joint to bring either manipulator to bear. Its flywheel is identical to is predecessor save that it has a hand as well, which is inserted into the gear port to fire the spike.
- Insulating Armor: Special armor Dai-Guard is composed of, giving it a high resistance to electricity and electromagnetic impulses sometimes emitted from Heterodyne. In episode 15 this armor is given an electromagnetic shield to protect it from intense heat for up to three minutes.

=== Kokubogar ===
When the army realized that they could not seize the privately owned Dai-Guard, they built Kokubogar based on Dai-Guard's design to fight the Heterodynes. It was piloted by Akagi's former robot piloting class professor and two of his students. Its first battle was an outstanding success, but in the second one the Heterodyne fused with the robot with the pilot still inside who was rescued by Akagi in Dai-Guard. Repairs were completed in time for the Army to assist Dai-Guard in the final battle of the series. Its main weapons include:

- Knot Buster: Originally designed for Dai-Guard, the Knot Buster was seized by the Army. It was destroyed in its third engagement.
- Machine Guns: Kokubogar had powerful machine guns mounted above the optics.
- Rocket Launcher: In the final battle, Kokubogar fires a volley of rockets from its forearm, saving Dai-Guard from a certain defeat. It is uncertain if this weapon is mounted on both arms.

== Heterodyne ==
Mysterious entities formed from dimensional quakes all around Japan. They form from crystalline hexagons called "Fractal Knots" that act as their nucleus and form into bodies using the matter around them. Although fractal knots replicate themselves indefinitely, if the original is destroyed it will immediately reduce the rest of the body into ethanol. Aside from traveling through dimensions, having Fractal Knots, and being attracted to electromagnetic hot spots, they have very little in common with each other.

- Grub Type: Appears in episode 1 at the very beginning years before the main story and later in episodes 21 and 22. Powers include a heat cannon from the mouth that fires explosive yellow energy balls that range from a barrel of dynamite to rivaling napalm, swimming, armor that can survive an OE bomb, explosive melting particles from the mouth, and reformation in a matter of hours. In Super Robot Wars Z2 it is referred to as Insect-R.
- Ray Type: Appears in episodes 1 and 2. Powers include swimming up to 30 knots, spawning lightning storms to indicate its arrival, twin arm whips, using its starfish-like limbs for bashing, and levitation while on land. A two headed suit of it appears briefly in episode 23 that resembles Pestar from the original Ultraman.
- Saucer Type: Appears in episode 3. Powers include levitation, underside heat flashes, and using its body as a throwing disc by ramming it into opponents.
- Glob Type: Appears in episode 4. Powers include being a large ball used for rolling and ramming and absorbing earth to make itself larger.
- Pyramid Type: Appears in episode 5. Powers include levitation, an electrical force field, and conductive mud tentacles from the seams in the body.
- Sonic Type: Appears in episode 6. Powers include levitation and a high frequency barrier around its body that dissolves solid objects although it has no effect on liquids and presumably gases.
- Mushroom Type: Appears in episode 7. Powers include regeneration, sprouting mushrooms from its root-like structures, spawning thorny vines from its head, and launching needles from the head.
- Balloon Type: Appears in episode 9. Powers include levitation and a highly rubbery body.
- Flower Type: Appears in episode 10. Powers include swimming, immunity to radar detection, and a body composed mostly of water that allows it to dilute acids.
- Fuser Type: Appears in episode 11. Powers include reducing its body to liquid, levitation, spheres around its body to protect the fractal knot, can regenerate its entire body in a matter of hours, and can fuse with opponents.
- Electric Type: Appears in episode 11. Powers include phasing through solid objects, emitting electrical bolts, and flight.
- Kokubogar Fusion: Appears in episodes 11 and 12. It is a fusion between Fuser Type, Kokubogar, and later Electric Type. Powers include flight, five red spheres attached to electrical pulses used like missiles from directly overhead, and extensible limbs.
- Cylinder Type: Appears in episode 13. Powers include flight at 30 kilometers per hour, twin whip antennae, regeneration, and adaption to enemy attacks over time.
- Magnetic Type: Appears in episode 15. Powers include floating on top of water, emitting electromagnetic waves hot enough to scorch humans alive, and tentacles from its top.
- Wheel Type: Appears in episode 16. Powers include levitation, rotating fast enough to generate static electricity, and using its body rotation like a tornado.
- Burrower Type: Appears in episode 17. Its only known power is burrowing 10 centimeters a year and has a body size that covers all of Kyoto. The Dai-Guard team decides not to destroy this Heterodyne, as its destruction would cause the collapse of the entire city. Suspected to have first appeared many years ago and has lain dormant since.
- Spike Type: Appears in episode 18. Powers include rotating its body for burrowing long distances, emitting a high-pitched noise from its body, and using its eight retractable spikes for puncturing hard surfaces. It has also been referred to as the Central Line Monster and Subway Slayer.
- Ice Type: Appears in episodes 19 and 20. Powers include flight, floating on top of water, forming a sheet of ice covering its body for armor, heat absorption, and freezing its opponents over with ice.
- Starfish Type: Mentioned at the end of episode 23 and appears at the very beginning of episode 24. It possesses no known powers.
- Giant Type: Appears in episodes 24, 25, and 26 and possesses the largest size of any Heterodyne with its starting size at 2 kilometers in diameter. Powers include levitation, extensible spear tentacles, can hide most of its body in the Heterodynes' home dimension, radio interference, size growth to the point of covering Earth within a month, regeneration, and spikes from the top of the body.
- Black Dai-Guard: Appears in the final episode and acts as the guardian of Giant Type's fractal knot. Powers include an extensible lower half, super speed, and morphing its right hand as a drill and mace.

== Media ==
=== Anime ===
From episodes 2–25, the opening theme is "Rojiura no Uchū Shōnen" (路地裏の宇宙少年; "Back Alley Space Boy") by The Cobratwisters (ザ・コブラツイスターズ, Za Koburatsuizutāzu) while the first ending theme from episodes 1–25 is "Hashire Hashire" (走れ走れ; "Run, Run") by Kyoko Endou (遠藤響子, Endō Kyōko). For episode 26, the second ending theme is "Rojiura no Uchū Shōnen" by The Cobratwisters.

No.	Title	Original release date	English air date
1	"Disaster from the Sea"; Transliteration: "Umi kara kita saiyaku" (Japanese: 海から来た災厄)	October 5, 1999	February 27, 2003
Turned over to the company's PR division, Dai-Guard has become little more than a tourist attraction at Atami. However, a Ray-Type Heterodyne reappears from the ocean and moves towards the shore. PR Division worker Akagi Shunsuke is insistent that he and his co-workers should pilot the robot for the purpose it was meant for and convinces his co-pilots Ibuki Momoi and Keiichiro Aoyama to activate Dai-Guard. Against the objections of the higher-up officials, the engage the Heterodyne with Dai-Guard and manage to force it back into the sea.
2	"The Fort at Night"; Transliteration: "Yoruno Odaiba daikōbōsen" (Japanese: 夜のお台場大攻防戦)	October 12, 1999	February 28, 2003
Against the wishes of both the Army and 21st Century Defense Security, Akagi and the rest of PR Division decide to help those hurt in the Heterodyne attack by flying them to a hospital in military transports to Tokyo. As if dealing with army and company politics wasn't enough, the situation only gets worse when a Ray-Type Heterodyne resurfaces for a second attack. Dai-Guard is hastily refitted, including a new drill arm with acceleration boosters and they re-engage the Heterodyne. Unfortunately, the drill arm upsets the balance of Dai-Guard, but Ibuki manages to use it to destroy the Heterodyne, just as all the paperwork is signed at headquarters to approve the operation.
3	"Circumstances of a Hero"; Transliteration: "Hīrō no genjitsu" (Japanese: ヒーローの現実)	October 19, 1999	—
The fighting may be over, but the paperwork is just beginning, as damage claims and lawsuits related to Dai-Guard's last mission start piling up. Whilst the rest of PR Division 2 buckles down to tackling the economic fallout, Aoyama decides that he wants nothing more to do with Dai-Guard and quits his job. A Saucer-Type Heterodyne surfaces near Yokohama and Dai-Guard is re-mobilized, but without Aoyama, Akagi cannot control it. Aoyama relents and joins them, and they are able to destroy the Heterodyne, but not without causing some damage and related expense for the Division.
4	"The Heroine's Melancholy"; Transliteration: "Hiroin no yūutsu" (Japanese: ヒロインの事情)	October 26, 1999	—
The directors decide to capture the next Heterodyne instead of destroying it to analyze its structure – they also see potential profit in the Dai-Guard technology. Rumors begin flying around about a new Enterprise Division to take charge of Dai-Guard. This suits Aoyama who feels it's too dangerous, but Ibuki wants to continue, and feels she must prove her worth after her father asks her to quit. A Globe-Type Heterodyne appears and the team decides to demonstrate that they are the best people for the job. With the assistance of the army, tactical advisor agent Shirota and excellent work by Ibuki they destroy the Heterodyne and keep their jobs.
5	"Can't Run Facing the Setting Sun"; Transliteration: "Yūhi ni mukatte hashire nai" (Japanese: 夕日に向かって走れない)	November 2, 1999	—
President Ookouchi and the "Iron" Major Busujima argue over the ownership of Dai-Guard, but it remains in the hands of the 21st Century Defense Security. Agent Shirota advises the Major that it would be counter-productive to requisition the Dai-Guard. A Pyramid Type Heterodyne appears and the army tries to stop it. An injured truck driver lies trapped on top of it and Shirota advises the Akagi that saving him is not as important as stopping the Heterodyne. Defying Shirota, Akagi and the crew take Dai-Guard out to rescue the driver, but Dai-Guard is almost incapacitated in the process. Shirota realizes that the Heterodyne is heading for a nuclear power plant and orders it shut down, instructing Akagi to attack the Heterodyne at a critical moment. With the Heterodyne destroyed, Akagi realizes that it was through the combined effort of the military, Shirota and Dai-Guard that they were successful.
6	"Memories Taught Me"; Transliteration: "Omoide wa oshie tekureta" (Japanese: 思い出は教えてくれた)	November 9, 1999	—
A former shopping center destroyed in the first Heterodyne attack 12 years earlier is scheduled for reconstruction. It includes a park where Ibuki used to play as a child with her father, a research scientist who was killed in the first Heterodyne attack. A Sonic-Type Heterodyne appears and makes its way across the city, but a father and child are in its path. Akagi defies Shirota and takes Dai-Guard to delay the Heterodyne. Ibuki realizes that it's vulnerable to liquids and Haruo Oosugi instructs Akagi to get Dai-Guard to throw a tanker filled with acid at it, destroying it. Meanwhile Rika Domeki gathers more information about Heterodyne behavior. Shirota recommends to the Major that Dai-Guard should be under military control.
7	"Fire and Ice"; Transliteration: "Fayā & aisu" (Japanese: ファイヤー&アイス)	November 16, 1999	—
A Mushroom-Type Heterodyne appears in the city but doesn't move for a week, and the 21st Century Defense Security doesn't want to get involved and risk any financial losses by using Dai-Guard. While Shirota and Akagi discuss their different approaches over dinner, the Heterodyne's spores sprout up through the streets. While the army tries to destroy the Heterodyne's sprouts, Akagi goes into a supermarket basement to rescue a dog but is injured by falling rubble. Akagi teaches Shirota how to pilot Dai-Guard, meanwhile Domeki calls through with information about the Heterodyne's vulnerability - a crystalline hexagon called a Fractal Knot. Shirota pilots Dai-Guard to attack the Heterodyne, but it counter-attacks damaging Dai-Guard. Akagi and Shirota cooperate to grab one of its needles and puncture the crystalline hexagon, destroying the Heterodyne.
8	"A Strange Day"; Transliteration: "Kimyō na tsuitachi" (Japanese: 奇妙な一日)	November 23, 1999	—
Things are quiet at 21st Century Defense Security with everyone doing tedious administrative tasks. Finally, there is a Heterodyne warning and the crew enter Dai-Guard on stand-by. Akagi and Ibuki have an argument because he made fun of her that morning, and unfortunately it is transmitted through the public address system. Ibuki seems tense and Aoyama has problems at home. Akagi apologizes to Ibuki who tells him that her stepfather wants her to quit the Dai-Guard crew. Aoyama goes home to take care of his mother, but she tells him to go to work and not worry.
9	"Explosion! Knot Buster!"; Transliteration: "Bakuhatsu! Knot Buster!!" (Japanese: 炸裂！ノットバスター！！)	November 30, 1999	—
Ijyuuin and Tanigawa see a Balloon-Type Heterodyne overhead while having a day off at an onsen. It appears to be heading towards a dam and hydro-electric plant. Dai-Guard is flown to the site in parts and assembled, but it is too slow and cumbersome in the mountains and cannot capture the Heterodyne. The process is repeated 3 times without success until a final effort is made using a newly delivered weapon, the Knot Buster, designed by Rika Domeki. Attached to Dai-Guard's arm the weapon pierces and destroys the Heterodyne, however as the army paid cash for the weapon, under Shirota's orders they take it into their possession.
10	"Wages That Correspond to Justice"; Transliteration: "Seigi ni miau kyūryō" (Japanese: 正義に見合う給料)	December 7, 1999	—
The ANPO and Shirota announce a new anti-Heterodyne robot called Kukobogar and plan to stop civilian robots such as Dai-Guard being used. Meanwhile Aoyama rushes his mother to hospital where he meets Ibuki who is arguing with her mother over her father's scientific work. At a press conference, Akagi questions the capacity of Kukobogar and a comparison test is proposed. On the day of the test, Akagi has a high temperature, and meets the military Kukobogar pilots, including his former instructor Major Iizuka. The tests begin, but they favor Kukobogar and Dai-Guard loses each one. During a break, a Flower-Type Heterodyne appears in the harbor. Akagi disobeys orders and attacks the Heterodyne with acid but being composed of water the acid has little effect. Kukobogar is deployed, and using Knot Buster, it destroys the Fractal Knot of the Heterodyne, dissipating it. As a goodwill gesture Shirota sends some to the congratulatory flowers to Akagi who is recovering in hospital from his illness.
11	"Alibi: Two Heterodynes Attack Tokyo"; Transliteration: "Fuzai shōmei。Ni dai heterodain Tōkyō shūgeki" (Japanese: 不在証明 二大ヘテロダイン東京襲撃)	December 14, 1999	—
Ooyama visits Akagi in hospital and blames Ibuki and Aoyama for Dai-Guard's failure. A new Fuse-Type Heterodyne appears and Kukobogar is deployed to fight it. During the battle, Shirota orders the crew to recover the Fractal Knot of the Heterodyne. While the Fractal Knot is being examined at military headquarters it starts to regenerate, but at the same time an Electric-Type Heterodyne appears in the city. Major Iizuka is ordered to use Kukobogar to subdue the Heterodyne at headquarters first to avoid potential embarrassment, leaving the people in the city and the underground at the mercy of the Electric-Type Heterodyne. Back at the hangar, the Fuse-Type Heterodyne envelops Kukobogar with Iizuka inside and heads towards Shinjuku. The Major orders the military to fire on the two Heterodynes, ignoring the risk to citizens trapped there against Shirota's objections. Shirota realizes the military prefer saving face over the lives of citizens and goes to the Dai-Guard hangar and offers to pilot the robot himself. Dai-Guard neutralizes the Electric-Type Heterodyne, but it escapes and merges with the Fuse-Type and attacks Dai-Guard. Shirota does not fight back because Iizuka is still inside the merged Heterodyne.
12	"Shinjuku at Night: Big Battle"; Transliteration: "Yoru no Shinjuku daikessen" (Japanese: 夜の新宿大決戦)	December 21, 1999	—
President Ookouchi asks Colonel Nishina to wait for two hours before the all-out attack on the Heterodyne to allow a new weapon, the Knot Punisher designed by Rika Domeki to be fitted to Dai-Guard. Colonel Nishina orders Major Busujima to comply and the army surrounds the Heterodyne with vibration land mines while Dai-Guard is retrieved for the upgrade. Meanwhile Akagi has left the hospital and made his way to the Dai-Guard hangar. With the Knot Punisher weapon fitted, Akagi pilots Dai-Guard towards the merged Heterodyne. Guided by Domeki, Akagi engages the Heterodyne and destroys its Fractal Knot, dissipating the Heterodyne and freeing Kukobogar to the cheers of the citizens. The military commander orders that Shirota and Busujima be punished for their failures and embarrassment of the military. Back at 21st Century Defense Security Corporation the managing director prepares to deal with President Ookouchi for pursuing what he sees as a personal grudge against the military.
13	"Things that can be Forgiven, Things that can't be Forgiven"; Transliteration: "Yurusa reru mono yurusa rezaru mono" (Japanese: 許される者 許されざる者)	December 28, 1999	—
Major Busujima is reprimanded for the failure and damage to Kukobogar which again leaves Dai-Guard as the only defense against the Heterodynes. Shirota is sent back to work as adviser with the 21st Century Defense Security Corporation whose staff are preparing for a Christmas party. A new Cylinder-Type Heterodyne appears and heads towards the North Fuji Exercise Grounds but the military announce they will deal with it themselves, so the 21st Century staff proceed with their Christmas party and Ibuki invites Shirota along. The first and second attacks by the Anzen Hoshou Army with conventional weapons fails and the Heterodyne remains intact. President Ookouchi decides to send Dai-Guard while the military argue about the best course of action. With Shirota's tactical skills, the Dai-Guard crew manage to destroy the Heterodyne, much to the annoyance of Busujima. At 21st Century, the board of directors vote to dismiss President Ookouchi.
14	"Oosugi Report"; Transliteration: "Ōsugi hi repōto" (Japanese: 大杉○秘レポート)	January 4, 2000	—
Haruo Oosugi, the chief and supervisor of Public Relations Division 2 of 21st Century Defense Security Corporation, provides a report on the construction of Dai-Guard, the events to date and biographies of the company staff.
15	"We Are All Alive"; Transliteration: "Bokura wa Minna Ikiteiru" (Japanese: ぼくらはみんな生きている)	January 11, 2000	—
Company Director Nishijima announces to company staff that he will become President and that Ookouchi is to be relieved of his position. Toru Saeki is sent to be Shirota's aid and with Nishijima's agreement immediately begins shifting the focus towards a reduction of costs and more military application of Dai-Guard. Saeki stops Dai-Guard being used in the annual Fire Department Parade. A Magnetic-Type Heterodyne appears over the city, but because of a lack of data about its Saeki prevents the Dai-Guard crew from mobilizing. Shirota tells Saeki to activate Dai-Guard, but he refuses as the probability of damage is too high, and he thinks Shirota has abandoned the logical analytical process that he taught. Domeki manages to hack into Dai-Guard and by-pass the army's encryption. Shirota arrives, relieves Saeki and resumes tactical responsibilities. With the combined efforts of Shirota, Domeki and the Dai-Guard crew, the Heterodyne is destroyed. Nishijima is intent on crushing the undisciplined behavior of PR Division 2, and eagerly receives a special report from Saeki proposing a new Dai-Guard Enterprise Division.
16	"Always Sunny in the Soul"; Transliteration: "Itsumo Kokoro ni Taiyo wo" (Japanese: いつも心に太陽を)	January 18, 2000	—
Haruo Oosugi announces to the staff that Public Relations Division 2 has been dissolved. Just then, a quake is recorded and Akagi, Ibuki and Aoyama rush to the Dai-Guard hangar only to be confronted by Saeki and an army-trained crew. Akagi's crew are relieved of their duties and Saeki informs Shirota that he will be assigned to anti- Heterodyne research. Shitota objects to the new arrangements and realizes that he's changed since meeting Akagi and working with him. The staff receive their transfer notices and most accept that it is better than unemployment, but Ooyama objects feeling that the efforts of the staff has been ignored. That evening a Wheel-Type Heterodyne appears near Tokyo in the region where Ooyama and Ikagi live. The army deploys Dai-Guard with the new crew, but they have trouble coping with the unpredictable behavior of the Heterodyne. Shirota and Domeki offer to help Dai-Guard and give Saeki instructions on how to destroy the Heterodyne's Fractal Knot. Meanwhile Ikagi and Ooyama help lead local citizens to safety. In the aftermath, many of the former Public Relations Division 2 arrive at the scene, concerned about Ooyama's safety and assist with the relief effort.
17	"I'd Like to Sleep as if Dreaming"; Transliteration: "Yume niru ya uni ne moritai" (Japanese: 夢見るようにねむりたい)	January 25, 2000	—
Religious fanatic Taikai Sakuraou claims to understand the Heterodyne and Nishijima is happy to cooperate with him as he sees an opportunity for the company. Meanwhile the Public Relations Division 2 staff have become time-watchers and plan one last get-together at onsen on the weekend. They find a dormant Heterodyne and debate whether to report it and ruin their vacation. However, the next morning, Taikai, Dai-Guard, Shirota and Saeki arrive to attack the Heterodyne. Akagi defies them, because the old owner believes the Heterodyne is his wife. The argument becomes about the 21st Century Defense Security Corporation's objective of protecting people versus the army's objective of destroying a Heterodyne. Taikai is frustrated at the missed opportunity to publicly destroy a Heterodyne. The army Dai-Guard crew start up the Drill Arm to activate the Heterodyne. Shirota stops them, but it is too late, and he authorizes Akagi and his crew to pilot Dai-Guard and defeat it. Akagi decides to subdue rather than fight the Heterodyne, and it slowly reduces in size. Domeki's analysis shows that over a period of 10 years the Heterodyne had expanded under the entire city of Kyoto, but that it's slowly heading downwards so may pose no threat at all.
18	"Run Towards Tomorrow"; Transliteration: "Ashita ni Mukatte Hashire" (Japanese: 明日に向かって走れ)	February 1, 2000	—
Company President Nishijima tells the board that the new Dai-Guard Enterprise Division will improve the company's fortunes. Shirota is under house arrest and the former PR Division 2 staff redeployed. A Spike-Type Heterodyne appears and Dai-Guard is activated but fails again. The Heterodyne re-appears 10 days later and again the Dai-Guard crew fails to catch it. Meanwhile hearing the news, Akagi leaves his workstation on snow-covered Mt Fuji and heads out on foot to Tokyo. The Heterodyne re-appears again and Domeki arrives at the site promising new technology to improve control of Dai-Guard. The crew take their positions on board and manage to capture and then destroy the Heterodyne. Unfortunately, they are revealed to be Akagi's crew who managed to get on board with the assistance of their former co-workers. Haruo Oosugi announces that President Ookouchi is back as president of the company and that Public Relations Division 2 will be re-instated.
19	"White Contract"; Transliteration: "Shiro no Keiyaku" (Japanese: 白の契約)	February 8, 2000	—
A Self Defense Force fighter plane fires on a suspected Heterodyne but destroys a foreign scout aircraft instead. The 21st Century PR Division 2 struggles with contracts signed by Nishijima that commits Dai-Guard to other duties such as a weapon in war zones. Meanwhile it is dispatched to Sapporo Snow Festival for a promotional display. An Ice-Type Heterodyne moves towards Japan, but the Self Defense Force cannot attack because after the earlier mistake their activities are now limited to defense only. Also, Arisa, head of the Snow Festival organizing committee, and old friend of Aoyama whom he left behind, will not allow Dai-Guard to move for three days as specified in their contract. The Self Defense Force stand helplessly by as the Heterodyne comes ashore. Akagi defies Arisa, and they take Dai-Guard out to attack the Heterodyne but runs out of battery power due to the extreme cold and the Heterodyne escapes.
20	"Blue Promise"; Transliteration: "Ao no Yakusoku" (Japanese: 青の約束)	February 15, 2000	—
Just as the Self Defense Force receives permission to engage the Heterodyne, foreign planes are detected heading towards Japan, possibly to capture the Heterodyne. Akagi's friend in the Self Defense Force, Ishihara, steals Akagi's access card and takes off in the Dai-Guard Fighter to destroy the Heterodyne and Akagi goes in pursuit. Meanwhile Arisa provides information about a geothermal generator to attract the Heterodyne. Ishihara reveals that he was the pilot who made the mistake and shot down the foreign aircraft. Akagi retrieves the Dai-Guard Fighter and connects with the other components to assemble Dai-Guard, but it becomes trapped in ice created by the Heterodyne. The Self Defense Force come to its aid and frees Dai-Guard, but the Heterodyne core escapes again. However, it is attacked by Self Defense Force aircraft who have just received clearance to attack, and it is shot down. Akagi and Dai-Guard then destroy it as it falls to the ground. Finally, Ishihara and Arisa are reconciled.
21	"False Memories"; Transliteration: "Itsuwari no Kioku" (Japanese: 偽りの記憶)	February 22, 2000	—
On the 13th anniversary of the detonation of the O-E bomb, Ibuki spends the day with her mother and stepfather, but she argues with him when he insists that she quit her involvement with Dai-Guard. She gets called back to headquarters because of a Heterodyne alert, and encounters Domeki who is intrigued by Ibuki's father, Eijirou Sakurada's research. A Grub-Type Heterodyne appears similar to the first one of 13 years ago. Domeki tries to convince Ibuki that her father was not a hero fighting the Heterodyne, instead a scientist fascinated by them, but Ibuki refuses to believe it. Dai-Guard approaches the Heterodyne, but Ibuki is distracted by what she's learned and doesn't focus on the battle. The Grub-Type Heterodyne is more powerful than the others and fires balls of energy at Dai-Guard which suffers major damage. When Ibuki comes to, she realizes that Akagi and Aoyama are unconscious.
22	"So That I Can Remain Myself"; Transliteration: "Watashi ga Watashi de aru Tameni" (Japanese: 私が私であるために)	February 29, 2000	—
The PR Division 2 staff are aghast when Domeki tells them that she's the one who told Ibuki the truth about her father which caused her self-doubt. As Ibuki prepares to resign her stepfather takes her to an area where people are injured from the Heterodyne attacks where he gets her to help him tend to the injured people. She realizes that by piloting Dai-Guard she can prevent more damage and injuries. She goes to join Akagi and Aoyama who are struggling without her skills and together they defeat the Heterodyne. Later, Ibuki thanks her stepfather for supporting her.
23	"What Do You Want to Protect?"; Transliteration: "Mamori tai mono, nandesuka?" (Japanese: 守りたい物、なんですか？)	March 7, 2000	—
During a period with zero probability of any Heterodyne appearing, PR Division 2 staff engage in more mundane activities. Irie Somai decides to make a film about the heart and soul of Dai-Guard and begins filming her co-workers. When she interviews Domeki about the Heterodyne phenomenon, Domeki can provide no explanation for them, postulating that they may have to deal with the Heterodynes forever, like typhoons, earthquakes or tsunami. Akagi has to give a speech to potential new employees at the 2031 spring hiring ceremony. These activities provoke thoughts about their motivations for working with Dai-Guard and when the staff view the film footage by Irie and Nakahara they realize that it is the simple moments of people's daily lives they are fighting to protect. However as everyone takes a boat to one of Tanigawa's favorite restaurants, Oosugi receives a phone call that a Heterodyne has been sighted.
24	"Something that Covers the Sky"; Transliteration: "Sora wo ōu mono" (Japanese: 空を覆うもの)	March 14, 2000	—
Dai-Guard faces a Starfish-Type Heterodyne and destroys it, one of many in the past month. Shirota informs Akagi that Kukobogar is about to be recommissioned, and that the army is working on a second unit as well. A Giant-Type Heterodyne forms over Tokyo but seems inactive. Tokyo is evacuated as a precaution, but after a week there is no change, and the city is completely deserted. Becoming impatient Busujima proposes finding and targeting the Fractal Knot of the Heterodyne with combat aircraft. The fighters score a direct hit on what they believe is the Fractal Knot, but the Heterodyne reacts by sending down a multitude of struts like giant roots, smashing through anything in the way and embedding themselves in the ground. Eventually it covers Tokyo like a giant umbrella.
25	"Thoughts that Keep Piling Up"; Transliteration: "Kasanari yuku omoi" (Japanese: 重なりゆく思い)	March 21, 2000	TBA
The ANPO Army tries in vain to destroy the Heterodyne and it starts to grow. Busujima proposes that they use O-E (Over-Explosion) bomb to destroy it before it engulfs the planet. Domeki locates the Fractal Knot near the top, 5,000 metres high. PR Division 2 propose to fly Dai-Guard to that point using the Kukobogar transport plane. Busujima refuses permission for Shirota to use the planes, but Shirota authorizes the deployment of both Kukobogar and two transport planes himself. Dai-Guard and Kukobogar are deposited on the surface of the Heterodyne and commence to make their way across the top of the Heterodyne towards the Fractal Knot, meanwhile the army allows them three hours to complete the operation before they use the O-E bomb.
26	"Victory Song for Tomorrow"; Transliteration: "Ashita heno gaika (saishūkai)" (Japanese: 明日への凱歌)	March 28, 2000	—
The Heterodyne takes defensive action against Dai-Guard and Kukobogar, creating large spikes and delaying their progress. On the ground, preparations are made to evacuate everyone and to launch the O-E bomb. As Dai-Guard and Kukobogar approach the Fractal Knot the Heterodyne creates a similar giant robot of its own. It attacks and disables Kukobogar and then engages Dai-Guard. Time is running down to zero and Busujima eagerly awaits the opportunity to launch the O-E bomb. Using Dai-Guard's emergency parachute, Akagi blinds and stops the Heterodyne robot and further growth of the Heterodyne. However, time has run out, and Busujima prepares to launch the O-E bomb but is stopped by Saeki so that Akagi and the others can complete their mission. Akagi manages to find the original Fractal Knot and fires Dai-Guard's the Knot Punisher 2 into it. The Heterodyne begins to crumble and disintegrate and both robots start free-falling. Iizuka deploys Kukobogar's parachute and Akagi deploys Dai-Guard's parachute as well, but it was damaged in the battle and collapses, causing Dai-Guard to plunge to the ground. Fortunately, Dai-Guard falls into a muddy pond and the crew survive. Later, Shirota takes a pay cut, but keeps his job. While Dai-Guard is being repaired, PR Division 2 goes back to processing paperwork and assisting with emergencies and Kukobogar takes responsibility for dealing with any Heterodyne attacks.

=== Merchandise ===
In September 2011, Bandai released Dai-Guard in the Super Robot Chogokin line. The figure comes with all of the weapons featured in the anime. Kokubogar was released as a Tamashii Web Shop exclusive in March 2012.

=== Video game ===
Dai-Guard makes its video game debut in Super Robot Wars Z2.

== Reception ==
The Encyclopedia of Science Fiction described Dai-Guard as an amusing anime distinguished by making ordinary office workers its heroes and by contrasting the mundanity of corporate paperwork, budgets and bureaucracy with the spectacle of a giant mecha battling monsters. It argued that the battles themselves function largely as a MacGuffin, serving primarily to generate character interactions and conflicts involving corporate and military politics rather than constituting the series' main purpose. The encyclopedia also highlighted the broader public-relations team alongside the three pilots as an important part of the show's ensemble.
