= Tōshō Daimos =

Japanese anime television series

- Title card

闘将ダイモス (Tōshō Daimosu)
- Genre: Mecha
- Created by: Saburo Yatsude
- Anime television series
- Directed by: Tadao Nagahama
- Produced by: Takeyuki Suzuki
- Written by: Chizuru Takahama; Fuyunori Gobu; Katsuhiko Taguchi; Masaaki Sakurai; Masaki Tsuji; Saburo Yatsude; Shoichi Taguchi
- Music by: Shunsuke Kikuchi
- Studio: Nippon Sunrise (Note: Animation studio); Toei Company (Note: Production company)
- Licensed by: NA: Discotek Media; PH: Telesuccess Productions
- Original network: ANN (TV Asahi)
- Original run: 1 April 1978 – 27 January 1979
- Episodes: 44

Tōshō Daimos (闘将ダイモス, Tōshō Daimosu; "Fighting General Daimos") is a Japanese anime television series produced by Toei Company and animated by Nippon Sunrise. It is the third and final installment of the Robot Romance Series created by Sabuo Yatsude. It is directed by Tadao Nagahama as his last work with character designs by Yuki Hijiri. It aired on TV Asahi and its affiliates from April 1, 1978, to January 27, 1979, consisting of 44 episodes.

== Story ==
After the destruction of their home world, the survivors of the planet Baam head towards Earth with the goal of negotiating the purchase of land for emigration. Unfortunately, during the negotiations, the leader of planet Baam is assassinated by his second in command and the delegation from Earth is framed for the murder. In the ensuing chaos, Doctor Isamu Ryūzaki of the Earth delegation is shot and killed.

Shortly after the disastrous end of the talks, the Baam began a campaign of terror against Earth. The only thing standing between the Earthlings and annihilation is the transforming, karate-using super robot, Daimos and its pilot, Kazuya Ryūzaki, but that changes when he meets and falls in love with a mysterious girl named Erika, who turns out to be the daughter of the deceased Baam leader. Over the course of their struggles to reunite, Kazuya and Erika each learn that the other's people are not all evil, but also that their own people are not all good.

== Characters ==
=== Daimobic Base ===
Kazuya Ryūzaki (竜崎 一矢, Ryūzaki Kazuya)
Voiced by: Akira Kamiya

The pilot of Daimos and the hero of the series, he was raised by Izumi after his father's departure to space. After meeting and falling in love with Erika, he fights for the day when the war will end and they will be reunited, with his strong will of survival motivating him to be victorious. He is a karate black belt and champion which helps battling the monsters. When he was 14 years old, he suffered a terrible accident, but managed to finish his rehabilitation successfully. He was very shy to start the mission in Episode 1.

Kyōshirō Yūzuki (夕月 京四郎, Yūzuki Kyōshirō)
Voiced by: Kazuyuki Sogabe

Kazuya's friend with a dark brown Afro style hair, and the main pilot of the jet fighter Galva FX-II. Apart from being an ace fighter pilot, he is also a skilled swordsman who takes the war with the Baams very seriously.

Nana Izumi (和泉 ナナ, Izumi Nana)
Voiced by: Youko Kuri

The granddaughter of Shinichirou Izumi, an excellent marks woman and sometimes co-pilot of Galva FX-II. She has a crush on Kazuya, and initially resents Erika. She leaves the group for some time after committing a big mistake that almost costs her her life, and returns with a more serious attitude.

Shin'ichirō Izumi (和泉 振一郎, Izumi Shin'ichirō)
Voiced by: Hisashi Katsuta

The current leader and operator of the Daimobic. After the death of Doctor Ryuuzaki, he takes over the operations of the base and taught Kazuya in the art of Karate.

Cairo (カイロ, Kairo)
Voiced by: Yō Inoue

A support robot at Daimobic, Kairo is an assistant to Doctor Izumi, but is sometimes bumbling, wise-cracking and harassed by Nana's nanny Okane.

Okane (おかねさん, Okane-san)
Voiced by: Miyoko Asō

The Daimobic's caretaker and also the personal caretaker of Nana.

Genta (元太)
Voiced by: Masako Nozawa

Okane's annoying nephew.

=== Earth Military ===
Douglas Banks (ダグラス バンクス, Dagurasu Bankusu)
Voiced by: Shōzō Iizuka

A scientist from Utopia, he arrived at the Baam Greenpeace Force Base to examine the secret formula of the ring. Later, he gave this secret formula to Dr. Izumi to upgrade the Daimos-Light energy along with more weapon upgrades for Daimos.

Sakamori Miwa (三輪 防人, Miwa Sakamori)
Voiced by: Tamio Ōki

The general of Earth's military, Miwa is a bigot who wants nothing more than to see all of the aliens destroyed. In episode 38, he wants to take control of the Daimobic and Daimos itself, but in the end he gained nothing. In episode 40, he was knocked unconscious by Kazuya after the Daimobic relaunches from the Baam underwater base, and as his misdeeds were discovered, he was to be arrested.

Isamu Ryūzaki (竜崎 勇, Ryūzaki Isamu)
Voiced by: Shōzō Iizuka

Kazuya's father and founder of the Daimobic labs, who designed Daimos. He told Kazuya what to do before Kazuya's first mission. He was killed during the breakdown of the negotiations between the Baam People and the Earthlings.

=== Baam Empire ===
Emperor Leon (リオン大元帥, Rion Daigensui)
Voiced by: Tamio Ōki

A compassionate leader of the Baam Empire and father of both of Richter and Erika. He was assassinated by poisoning during the council meeting with the Earth forces.

Olban (オルバン, Oruban)
Voiced by: Hisashi Katsuta

Emperor Leon's personal adviser. He usurped the throne by killing Emperor Leon since the rightful heir has not reached the age of maturity. As their leader, he was selfish and eventually intended to turn everyone into zombies so nobody will rebel against him. In the end, he was killed by Richter in mortal combat but before he died, he revealed that he has a remote-controlled implant in his heart that in case he was killed, it would automatically control the whole Baam Asteroid City to move towards Jupiter, but this was thwarted by Kazuya and Richter.

Georiya (ゲロイヤー, Geroiyā)
Voiced by: Kazuya Tatekabe

Olban's right-hand man. He poisoned Emperor Leon and killed Kazuya's father which caused the Baams and Earthlings to go to war. He was killed by Richter in episode 42.

Richter (リヒテル, Rihiteru)
Voiced by: Osamu Ichikawa

A disgruntled admiral and prince who has hatred for all Earthlings because of his father's death. He has obsession to conquer the Earth and make it the new home for the Baam race until he found out that Georiya was the one who assassinated Emperor Leon and becomes determined to kill Olban and regain the throne of Baam. However, he ends up being mortally wounded by a wave of Baam genocide squad machine guns. Just before he dies, he manages to prevent the Baam Asteroid City from crashing into Jupiter and tells Kazuya to look after Erika for him. Although not an evil person, he is often blinded by his desire for vengeance.

Erika (エリカ)
Voiced by: Miyuki Ueda

The Baam princess, sister of Richter and the true love of Kazuya. Once a royal princess, while accompanying her father Leon and brother Richter to a council meeting with the earth forces, she witnessed her father's death, and, in attempting to calm Richter, accidentally caused Doctor Ryuzaki's death. Thus, to atone for the death of her father, she is working as a field doctor while Richter became the admiral for the Baam forces against Earth. In a space accident, she fell out of a burning spaceship and fell to the sea, losing her memory (temporary amnesia). Kazuya finds her unconscious after his first battle, and by that moment falls in love with her, unknowing that she is a Baam Seijin. After she recovers her memory, her guilty conscience becomes the greatest obstacle to their happiness.

Raiza (ライザ, Raiza)
Voiced by: Kazuko Yanaga

Richter's beautiful, green-haired scientist and a loyal subject of the Baam Empire. She has secret affections and high regards for Richter but she dislikes Erika because she considers her a traitor. In episode 42, she was killed by Olban while helping Richter to plan an assassination plot against the adviser.

Balbas (バルバス, Barubasu)
Voiced by: Shōzō Iizuka

Richter's bald-headed and secretly noble general whose rank is lower than Raiza. In episode 35, he was killed when he helped Kazuya get into Daimos.

Margarete (マルガレーテ, Marugarēte)
Voiced by: Miyoko Asō

Erika's caretaker, she was the only witness of the two royal siblings growing up, and eventually she is a confidant to Erika's feelings for the enemy pilot Kazuya. She even sacrificed her life to protect Erika from Richter's brutal torture.

Gurney Halleck (ガーニィハレック, Gānyi Harekku)
Voiced by: Hiroya Ishimaru

A Baam warrior who, in exchange for a pardon for his supposedly traitorous activities, challenged Kazuya to a man-to-man duel. When the duel was interrupted by Baam ninja attempting to kill them both, Kyoshiro helped him and Kazuya escape. During their rematch, a combat machine containing a nuclear bomb attacked them. Halleck entered the machine, flew it into space and sacrificed himself to save Kazuya. His name is a direct hommage to the eponymous character featured in Frank Herbert's novel "Dune", from 1965.

Aizam (アイザム, Aizamu)
Voiced by: Makio Inoue

A Baam scientist and also a close friend of Richter. Originally under the orders of Olban to replace Richter in the invasion of Earth, Aizam instead turned to Richter and became his trusted advisor. He hides a fatal sickness, but overworks himself. It is because of his inventions that Daimos was forced to undergo several upgrades. Aizam is killed in battle against Kazuya, declaring that he could not ask for more than a warrior's death in the battlefield.

Cindy (シンディ, Shindi)
Voiced by: Mari Okamoto

She is Erika's childhood friend. During her childhood, Erika saved her from a storm. In episode 16, she and Margarete sacrificed their lives to protect Erika from Richter's brutal torture.

Barandock (バランドーク, Barandōku)
Voiced by: Kenji Utsumi

He is the leader of Baam Greenpeace Force. He wanted bring peace with Baam and Earthlings. In episode 31, General Miwa had finally discovered his secret base in New Zealand. He tried to tell him that Baam are not the enemy but the wicked general ignore his words. He died when he activated the secret base's self-destruct sequence.

Worin (ウォーリン, Uōrin)
Voiced by: Mikio Terashima

A Baam physician, he is Erika's mentor. He saved Erika from Richter's execution and escaped from the Baam Underwater Base, but he was wounded during the escape with Erika and then rescued by General Miwa. In episode 18, he died when Erika failed to heal his wounds when General Miwa took her as prisoner.

== Development ==
Daimos was produced by Toei Animation with animation from Sunrise and sponsorship from Popy for the toys. The main mecha's name is derived from Deimos, one of the two moons of Mars. While producing the series, Nagahama based the series's theme around William Shakespeare's novel Romeo and Juliet, linking to its theme of Star-Crossed lovers revolving around the main characters. The concept itself was added during production, as he believes it can emphasize its dramatic nature such as humiliation, forbidden love and war for national interests.

The series's use of martial arts as the mech's main fighting style came from series producer Takeyuki Suzuki, with martial artist Kazutoshi Takahashi hired to do some of the needed poses and fighting styles to be used for the series.

Originally meant to have 50 episodes, the series was cut short to 44 due to low ratings in Japan alone. According to Nagahama, the series would have continued after episode 44, in which future unproduced episodes would revolve around both the Daimobic Base crew help the Baam Empire settle on Mars through terraformation.

== Media ==
=== Anime ===
Daimos was broadcast in Japan by TV Asahi from April 1, 1978, to January 27, 1979, replacing Voltes V. The series' opening theme is titled "Tate! Tōshō Daimos" (立て! 闘将ダイモス, Tate! Tōshō daimosu; "Rise! Fighting General Daimos") by Isao Sasaki featuring Koorogi '73 and Columbia Yurikago-kai with the ending theme titled "Erika no Ballad" (エリカのバラード, Erika no barādo; "The ballad of Erika") by Kumiko Kaori and Koorogi '73. 3B Productions strung the pivotal episodes of the show together to form a compilation movie under the title Starbirds.

Alongside Voltes V, the series was licensed by Telesuccess Productions in the Philippines. In December 2020, Discotek Media licensed the series for its DVD and Blu-ray release in North America.

=== Toys ===
Popy released a diecast toy of Daimos during the series' run in 1978. Like its anime counterpart, the toy could transform from robot to Tranzer mode. Aside from its array of weapons, the toy came with two mini replicas of Kazuya's Tryper 75S car. The company also released a Jumbo Machinder version of Daimos. The toy was first imported into North America by Mattel as part of their Shogun Warriors line of imported Super Robot toys. Bandai later released it as part of the Godaikin line in the 1980s.

In 2008, Bandai released a newer, smaller Daimos toy as part of their Soul of Chogokin line. This toy is more anime-accurate and more poseable than its Popy diecast predecessor. Unlike the original Popy toy, this toy has a more complex transformation in order to remain faithful to its anime design. In addition to its weapons and two miniature Tryper 75S cars, the toy comes with a larger-sized Tryper car that features an opening cockpit, movable wings and a Kazuya driver figure. A miniature replica of the Galva FX II plane is also included in the package. Bandai Spirits later released a non-transformable version of Daimos under the Soul of Chogokin Full Action line, with more articulation and assortment of accessoriries.

=== Live-action ===
In the Graphika Manila event of 2024, Riot Inc. showcased a pitch material clip proposing a live-action adaptation of Daimos. This presentation confirmed ongoing negotiations between GMA Network and Toei for the production of the live-action adaptation. Earlier, Annette Gozon-Valdes, Senior Vice President of GMA Network, has expressed the network's intent to produce this adaptation.

Prior to this, GMA Network successfully aired a live-action adaptation of Voltes V titled Voltes V: Legacy in 2023. Following the Philippine success of Voltes V: Legacy, it has been released in Japan and is planned for an international release.
