= Space Ironman Kyodain =

Japanese tokusatsu television series

- Title card
- Genre: Tokusatsu
- Created by: Shotaro Ishinomori
- Starring: Yusuke Natsu; Takeshi Sasaki; Satoshi Furukawa; Mitsuko Horie; Shozaburo Date; Baku Numata
- Narrated by: Michio Hazama
- No. of episodes: 48

Original release
- Network: TBS
- Release: April 2, 1976 – March 11, 1977

Space Ironman Kyodain (宇宙鉄人キョーダイン, Uchū Tetsujin Kyōdain, "Space Ironman Brothers") is a Japanese tokusatsu science fiction superhero television series. The show, like numerous others of its type and era, were produced as a joint effort between manga artist Shotaro Ishinomori and Toei Company producer Toru Hirayama. It premiered in 1976 and ran for 48 episodes. The show is well known for its strange plot and costume design, rapid-fire and purposefully disorienting editing, and unique, sometimes surreal, atmosphere. The late Yūsuke Natsu and Takeshi Sasaki (who previously portrayed Hayato Ichimonji in Kamen Rider) starred as Skyzel and Grounzel respectively.

== Plot summary ==
The plot of the program involves an alien empire from the planet "Dada" called the "Robot Army Corps". When they kidnap a human scientist, Dr. Hayami, and two of his three sons and force him to improve their technology, he has no choice but to go along with them, despite his deep anger, resentment, and guilt.

One year later, their empire sufficiently advanced, the Robot Army Corps return to Earth, ready to put their plans into action—however, two unknown robots charge in and stop their invasion cold. It is then revealed that Dr. Hayama programmed the personalities of his two kidnapped sons, Joji and Ryuji, into the two Cyberroids to combat the Robot Army and care for his youngest son, Kenji. Using their Cyber Graphy to assume the forms of Joji and Ryuji, the older brother Skyzel and his younger brother Grounzel carry out Dr. Hayami's wish as the Kyodain.

== Characters ==
=== Space Ironman Kyodain ===
- Skyzel (スカイゼル, Sukaizeru): The red jet-like older brother of the Kyodain who assumes the identity of Joji Hayama. Skyzel is able to transform into a jet-like form called the Skyjet (スカイジェット, Sukaijetto).
- Grounzel (グランゼル, Guranzeru): The blue car-like younger brother of the Kyodain who was forced to assume the identity of Ryuji Hayama. Grounzel is able to transform into a car-like form known as the Grouncar (グランカー, Gurankā).

=== Allies ===
- Dr. Hayama
- Kenji Hayama
- Gonbesu: Gonbesu (or Gombess) is the Kyodains' robot helper, using the Dadanium on gasoline to produce Energy Food that the brothers ingest through stomach tubes. It separates into two parts - its head, like a flying saucer, and its body, which resembles a huge bowling ball - when fleeing or attacking an enemy.

=== Villains (Dada Robot Army Corps) ===
- Dark Shogun Gaburin
- Gaburin Queen (ガブリンクィーン, Gaburin Kwīn): Gaburin's loyal vassal, number two on Planet Dada. Wields one of the two Moonlight Swords.
- Black Knight (ブラックナイト, Burakku Naito): The Kyodains' rival, wielding one of the two Moonlight Swords.
- Five Member Death Squad: Gaburin's followers, whom he later dismantled to use their cells for his use.

== Uniqueness ==
The oddity of the show is reflected in the costume designs—Skyzel has features of a jet, such as a nosecone on his head, not unlike the Transformers character Powerglide, and rockets on his chest, and Grounzel's outfit features exhaust pipes, headlights and superfluous tires. The props used to represent the transformed versions of the characters echo this aesthetic, with anthropomorphic features like fists featured on the vehicles. The most obvious example of this is the sculpted mouths, which move like a puppet's when the characters speak.

The editing is another aspect of the series that adds to its novelty. The fight scenes, which due to the nature of the series are very prominent, are edited in such a way that the action is seen from a variety of different angles very quickly and repeatedly, creating a disorienting and kinetic atmosphere.

== Merchandise ==
As with most other programs of this type, the series was heavily marketed. Die-cast action figures of the main characters and their alternate vehicle modes were produced as part of Popy's Chogokin during the series' run. The vehicles were later imported to the United States as part of the Shogun Warriors line. Jumbo Machinder versions of Grounzel and Skyzel were also produced.

In later years, soft vinyl toys of two protagonists were produced as part of Bandai's "Soul of Sofubi" toyline, and slightly stylized and reimagined versions were immortalized in statue form as part of the "Super Imaginative Chogokin Artistic Soul" series, also by Bandai.

== Culture ==
Though it has not had a profound impact on culture like its tokusatsu contemporaries Ultraman and Kamen Rider, Space Ironman Kyodain has been referenced in modern Japanese pop culture. For example, the first episode of the anime Lucky Star used Kyodain's theme song as its ending theme under the pretense of one of the characters, an otaku (voiced by Aya Hirano), singing it at a karaoke bar. Additionally, the film Kamen Rider Fourze the Movie: Space, Here We Come! features villainous versions of the Kyodain and a heroic version of Black Knight. In the film's tie-in web series Kamen Rider Fourze the Net Edition: Everyone, Let's Go to Class!, the segment Space Ironman Super Lecture sees Kamen Rider Fourze character Tachibana presenting an overview of the original Kyodain series.
