= Toynami =

American toy company

Toynami, Inc.
- Company type: Private
- Industry: Entertainment
- Founded: 2000; 26 years ago
- Founder: George Sohn
- Headquarters: Van Nuys, CA, United States
- Products: Action figures
- Website: toynami.com

Toynami, Inc. is an American toy company based in Van Nuys, California. Founded in 2000 by George Sohn, Toynami is primarily focused on anime licenses for specialty retailers and collectors in the North American market. The company's name is a portmanteau of the words "toy" and "tsunami".

Part of the early driving force that led to the creation of the company was Sohn's interest in producing and releasing modern Macross Valkyrie toys, something he spearheaded with Japanese company Yamato Toys while being vice president of Toycom, Yamato's U.S. division at the time. When legal issues arose blocking the non-grey market release of Yamato's Macross toys in North America, Sohn left Toycom and started Toynami, first acquiring the Robotech license, which was the catalyst that roadblocked Yamato and Toycom's Macross toys.

Using Robotech as a starting point, Toynami has since expanded, seeking other primarily anime-based licenses and aiming more towards collectors instead of the mass-market.

== Criticism ==
Toynami's reputation has been mixed since its inception, with the criticism of the company focused on overall quality. In 2001, the company advertised their Robotech Masterpiece Collection VF-1 Veritech Fighter toys as having approximately 33% diecast content. After several months of delays, the line's first model - VF-1J Rick Hunter - was released in the Summer of 2002, sans the promised diecast metal content as solicited. Other collectors were infuriated when their $3,000 Robotech Super Scale statues (which stand over 5' tall), were delivered with broken parts and substandard paint quality.

Following several complaints from collectors, Toynami issued a recall notice of their Robotech Masterpiece Collection Maia Shadow Fighter in January 2009. According to the company's statement, a new factory was commissioned to manufacture the toy, which was discovered to not meet quality control standards. Within the 60-day period from the recall notice, Toynami offered a full refund for every unit returned.

== Licenses ==
=== Current ===
- Bleach
- Macross (Note: U.S. Market via Harmony Gold USA)
- Naruto
- Naruto Shippuden
- Robotech
- Shogun Warriors (Note: Beast King GoLion and Armored Fleet Dairugger XV.)
- Acid Rain
- The Canmans
- Futurama
- Hello Sanrio
- Mameshiba
- Skelanimals
- So So Happy
- UNKL
- SpongeBob SquarePants
- Godzilla

=== Former ===
- Chobits
- Inuyasha
- Serial Experiments Lain
- Speed Racer
- Voltron
- The Chop Chops
- The Deviants
- Dynomutt
- Emily the Strange
- Harvey Birdman, Attorney at Law
- The Herculoids
- Precious Miseries
- Thundarr the Barbarian
