= Wakusei Robo Danguard Ace =

Japanese anime television series

- Planetary Robot Danguard Ace
- Title card

惑星ロボ・ダンガードA (Wakusei Robo Dangādo A (Ēsu))
- Genre: Mecha
- Created by: Leiji Matsumoto; Dan Kobayashi
- Anime television series
- Directed by: Tomoharu Katsumata
- Written by: Mitsuru Majima; Sōji Yoshikawa; Tatsuo Tamura; Haruya Yamazaki
- Music by: Shunsuke Kikuchi
- Studio: Toei Animation
- Original network: FNS (Fuji TV)
- Original run: March 6, 1977 – March 26, 1978
- Episodes: 56
- Manga
- Written by: Leiji Matsumoto
- Published by: Akita Shoten
- Magazine: Boken Oh
- Original run: 1977 – 1978
- Volumes: 2
- Anime film

Danguard Ace vs. Insect Robot Troop
- Directed by: Masayuki Akehi
- Produced by: Imada Chaiki
- Written by: Tatsuo Tamura
- Music by: Shunsuke Kikuchi
- Studio: Toei Animation
- Released: July 17, 1977
- Runtime: 30 minutes
- Anime film

Danguard Ace: The Great Space War
- Directed by: Masayuki Akehi
- Produced by: Imada Chaiki
- Written by: Tatsuo Tamura
- Music by: Shunsuke Kikuchi
- Studio: Toei Animation
- Released: March 18, 1978
- Runtime: 30 minutes

Planetary Robot Danguard Ace (惑星ロボ ダンガードA(エース), Wakusei Robo Dangādo Ēsu) is a Japanese science fiction anime series created by Leiji Matsumoto with Dan Kobayashi.

Danguard Ace was Matsumoto's only contribution to the mecha genre.

== Synopsis ==
Danguard Ace takes place on a future Earth in which natural resources have been depleted. People have begun looking toward other planets to survive, in particular to the tenth planet, Promete. Although people had hoped to peacefully settle there, disaster strikes as the first explorers are destroyed by betrayal.

After this event, an individual named Mr. Doppler announces that all attempts to reach Promete surrender to his command, those who do not will be destroyed. Using his own resources, Doppler constructs a vast military force greater than that of Earth's. He forbids anyone from approaching the planet, under the insane belief that only he is entitled to it.

To gain control of Promete, the governments of Earth begin constructing massive combat robots. Doppler is able to attack and destroy all of them before they are completed, except for Danguard Ace. The forces sent to attack Danguard's base were destroyed because of the efforts of Captain Dan. Nothing is known of this mysterious man, except that he previously served Doppler while under mind control.

Takuma Ichimonji, son of the man who betrayed the initial Promete exploration team, becomes a cadet at Danguard's base. Ichimonji hopes that he might restore his father's honor by fighting against Doppler's forces.

== Production ==
Some of the main character designs were similar to characters appearing in Space Battleship Yamato, which was known in the U.S. market as Star Blazers. The Takuma Ichimonji character resembles the Space Battleship Yamato character Susumu Kodai. The doctor on the show resembles Dr. Sakezo Sado from Space Battleship Yamato.

== International release ==
Cover of the first DVD volume

The series was released in English three times, first by M&M Productions under the title "The Planet Robot Danguard Ace" that saw limited release in Hawaii and the Philippines. The only remaining recording of this dub was a Story Record LP released in Japan. It was then licensed and redubbed by Jim Terry Productions, as part of the Force Five promotion and was rereleased later by combined episodes into a feature-length presentation. This film edit gained a cult following on Showtime during the 1980s.

The titular robot also had a leading role in Marvel Comics' Shogun Warriors series, as well as in the eponymous toy line.

In 2009, William Winckler Productions produced three all-new English dubbed film versions edited from the original series. Winckler, known for Tekkaman the Space Knight, wrote, produced and directed these films, which have been seen on broadband in Japan and a three volume DVD release in the United States.

In the early 1980s, a French-dubbed version was released through Jacques Canestrier Productions entitled Danguard - La Conquete des Planetes, but only the first volume of three episodes were released on VHS. It was released in Hong Kong and Italy in 1978 and was the first anime ever broadcast on a private channel in Italy. It also saw a 1986 release in both South Korea and Taiwan.
