= Reideen the Brave =

Japanese anime television series

- Title card

勇者ライディーン (Yūsha Raidīn)
- Genre: Mecha
- Created by: Yoshitake Suzuki
- Anime television series
- Directed by: Yoshiyuki Tomino (#01–25); Tadao Nagahama (#26–50)
- Written by: Masaki Tsuji; Sōji Yoshikawa
- Music by: Akihiro Komori
- Studio: Soeisha
- Original network: ANN (NET)
- Original run: April 4, 1975 – March 26, 1976
- Episodes: 50
- Anime television series

Reideen the Superior
- Directed by: Toshifumi Kawase
- Produced by: Yumi Murase; Hirofumi Umeshita; Toru Hasegawa
- Written by: Fumihiko Shimo; Hideki Sonoda
- Music by: Kenichi Sudo; Kiyoshi Murakami; Tom Keane
- Studio: Sunrise
- Original network: TV Tokyo
- Original run: October 2, 1996 – June 25, 1997
- Episodes: 38

Reideen the Brave (勇者ライディーン, Yūsha Raidīn), also known as "Brave Reideen" or "Heroic Raydeen", is a super robot anime series created by Tohokushinsha and produced by Soeisha (later renamed as Sunrise). It aired on Nihon Educational Television (now TV Asahi) from 4 April 1975 to 26 March 1976, with a total of 50 episodes. The series is marked as the first mecha anime series to introduce and popularize the concept of Transforming Mecha, which is also tied to its marketing gimmick in the 1970s.

Two spiritual remakes based on the series were made later after the original aired: the first one titled Reideen the Superior (超者ライディーン, Chōja Raidīn) was broadcast from 1996 to 1997 on TV Tokyo, and another called Reideen was broadcast in 2007 on WOWOW.

== Story ==
After a slumber of twelve millennia, the Demon Empire awakens to seize control of the Earth. Reideen, the giant robot-like protector of the lost continent of Mu, senses the evil presence and awakens within its golden pyramid. A young Japanese boy, Akira Hibiki, is alerted about the Demon Empire by a mysterious voice and rushes to the pyramid.

It is soon revealed that Akira is a descendant of the ancient people of Mu who must help Reideen save the Earth. Akira enters the robot by accelerating his motorcycle to a high speed and then throws himself upward, allowing a beam from the robot to pull him into the robot's head and into an internal cockpit from where he assumes control of Reideen. Akira is aided by Mari Sakurano, who happens to be the daughter of a prominent scientist, and his friends from the soccer club. Halfway through the story the Demon Empire's master, Barão, is released from his statue prison and intends to finish what he started twelve thousand years earlier.

== Mecha ==
Promotional artwork by Tohokushinsha company

=== Reideen ===
- Height: 50 meters
- Weight: 520 tons
- Armor: Mutronium
- Power source: Pyramid Power emitted from the Star of Ra Mu.

=== Weapons and powers ===
- God Missiles: Bird-like bladed missiles from its abdomen that are highly accurate. They are later upgraded with homing capabilities.
- God Block: A retractable shield in its right arm. This is later upgraded to be used as a buzzsaw called the God Block Spin.
- God Breaker: A sword hidden in the God Block.
- God Boomerang: A red bladed bird-like boomerang hidden in its right arm. This is later upgraded with a pair of rocket jets to make its impact faster and stronger.
- God Gorgon: Harpoon-like arrows stored in its back using, shot at enemies with a bow on its left wrist. These arrows are charged with energy from its left fingertip, and explode on contact. These are sometimes fired in barrages.
- God Gorgon: Tabane Uchi Da: The bow is later upgraded with both halves being sharpened, called the Gorgon Sword.
- Aura Shock: Electric shocks from its fingers.
- Telekinetic Beam (Nendo Kousen) God Alpha: A powerful energy field around its body used to deteriorate whatever is attacked by it.
- God Pressure: Green lightning bolts from its forehead.
- Energy Cutter: Surrounding its God Breaker with lightning to make it more powerful.
- God Voice: From the chest of Reideen, some satellite dishes are shown to amplify by several times Akira's voice, who screams "God Ra Mu". Extremely powerful purple sonic rings are launched from those satellite dishes, to entrap enemies and tear them apart at a molecular level, but this attack has heavy repercussions to its pilot, Akira.

==== God Bird ====
Reideen turns into an eagle-like jet for faster flight and often used for Reideen's finishing attacks.

- Ramming: Simply ramming through enemies at super sonic speeds, it also has a spinning variation called the Titan Drill.
- God Bird Claw: God Bird's talons.
- Esper Burn: Heat beams from the eyes. Also acts like x-ray vision, to lock-on the enemy's weak point and make the God Bird to pierce them easier.
- God Thunder: Summoning lightning from the sky and directing it towards an enemy.
- Head Cutter: The head part is separated from the body of Reideen and it is used like a battering ram, while the neck hole reveals a large blade tip, allowing Reideen to pierce enemies body.

=== Bluegar ===
A fighter that assists Reideen early into the series. It is armed with a variety of weapons.

=== Poindar ===
First appears in episode 21 and is piloted by Araiso and the children of the series. Powers include an extendable boxing glove (later two), claw hands for bashing, can be used as a submarine, a slingshot in the torso, and explosives attached to balloons.

== Demon Empire forces ==
- Demon Empire Robots: The human-sized infantry of the series, although hardly used in the second half. They are armed with a sword and a machine gun.
- Dlome (also referred to as Drones or Dromes): Fifteen-foot flying squid demons used for the first half of the series from episode 1 until episode 27. Although they appear to have disappeared at that point, in a flashback of Barao attacking the Mu Empire, they were seen along human-like demons rampaging cities. They are armed with only their twin tentacles and launch fireballs from their underside, although some have used weapons such as large missiles, swords, and even buzzsaws.
- Gante: A giant stone demon, shaped like an enormous human hand and sometimes called a dragon in some episodes, used to transport fossil beasts during the first half of the series. It first premiered in episode 1 and was destroyed in episode 27. It was armed with a variety of weapons.
- Mecha Gante: A mechanical version of Gante, first premiered in episode 39, that was used to transport colossal monsters until episode 48. Although it did not have many weapons, what it lacked in number it made up for in power.

=== Barao ===
The leader of the Demon Empire and appears in every episode starting with episode 2. He is an 800-meter-tall (2,600 ft) demon from the Underworld that sought the power of the Star of Ra Mu and used his minions, primarily of Dlomes and demon robots, led by the demon brothers Gohrai and Gekido, (Also Referred To As Storm And Fury) and Baragon leading the fossil beasts and colossal monsters. If Kibango's origin in episode 24 indicates anything during these events, it is that Barao had successfully kept at war with the Mu for at least two thousand years. Eventually, the Mu managed to use the Star of Ra Mu to defeat Barao by imprisoning him in a statue until the events of the series, and created Reideen to slay any future members of the Demon Empire that would eventually return; however, Reideen would require the control of someone half Mu and half human to operate to handle its power. Upon reawakening from his statue prison, Barao had lost his memories of Ra Mu, but still managed to recollect memories of his empire and those who served him. In episode 41, he begins to regain his memories due to the resurrection of Princess Lemuria (daughter of King Ra Mu and mother of Akira).

For the first half of the series, his powers included instilling life into rocks to create fossil beasts and eye heat rays when he was in his statue form until episode 27. Upon being released his powers included forming an entire island in a matter of seconds dubbed Demon Isle, psychically freezing weapons in mid air, seeing into other dimension, causing fissures, fusing colossal monsters, manipulation of the elements, hand lightning bolts and energy beams, mouth flames that create flaming tornadoes, purple horn energy bolts and balls, a bow and arrow, a barbed boomerang, summoning flames from the middle cave of his island, a giant scythe, blade resistance, levitation, constricting roots from the lower half of his body, and a pair of broadswords with hidden saw blades.

=== Fossil beasts ===
- Bastodon: Appears in episode 2. Powers include a right-arm sword, levitation, mouth flames, and can regenerate the left arm into a sword. He is one of the only two fossil beasts to appear in various Super Robot Wars titles.
- Garda: Appears in episode 3. Powers include burrowing, launchable pincer claw hands, spiked ball form, launchable torso spikes, and a head pincer.
- Madon: Appears in episode 4. Powers include whip tentacles all over the body, zombifying black lightning, regeneration, and blue electric surges.
- Bira: Appears in episode 5. Powers include levitation, ensnaring antennae, pink hyper sonic waves from the torso, scythe arms, and self-duplication.
- Tortoise: Appears in episode 6. Powers include launchable shell fragments, a cage hidden in the shell, and swimming.
- Scar: Appears in episode 7. Powers include launchable drills from the torso, reformation from miniature versions of itself, paralyzing electric surges, a chain of rocks from the scalp, and can constrict opponents when broken down.
- Shiva: Appears in episode 8. Powers include swimming, four arms, self-duplication, a tornado attack produced by it and the self-duplicate, and levitation. It is based on the Hindu god of the same name and is specifically stated to be 60 meters tall and weighing at 500 tons.
- Manmou: Appears in episode 9. Powers include ice burg encase, icy vortices from the ears that can freeze nearly anything, levitation, twin ensnaring trunks, and four launchable trunks that regenerate after launching.
- Jagger: Appears in episode 10. Powers include twin spiked buzzsaws for each hand attached to chains, large jaws for the lower half of the body, blade-resistant armor, can turn into his former human self, a constricting tentacle in the lower half jaws, a car mode, can withdraw its head quickly, and spike missiles from the shoulders. His name is pronounced as Jaguar, although his head appears to have more in common with that of a lynx and a saber-toothed tiger.
- Girudeen: Appears in episode 11. Powers include arrows from the mouth, swimming, flight, an imitation God Blade and God Boomerang on the right wrist that can regenerate if destroyed. He is one of the only two fossil beasts to appear in various Super Robot Wars titles.
- Algandos: Appears in episode 12. Powers include levitation, a thick turtle shell, can encase its body in flames using flamethrowers around the body, two green lasers from each eye, a tail that can detach and form into a serpent with large jaws, torso missiles, can absorb magma, and can increase its body temperature hot enough to melt projectiles upon making contact with its body.
- Shurga: Appears in episode 13. Powers include fanged serpents for hair that can regenerate quickly and eat through metal, a naginata with a sickle and trident, mouth flames, flight, pectoral missiles, launchable spikes from the back, can revert to her former human form, and can create illusions and manipulation of the environment by spinning her hair.
- Draculon: Appears in episode 14. Powers include a green heat ray from the torso mouth, flight, four cannons on each side of the torso, launchable harpoons from the wrists, spy bats, regeneration in a matter of hours, sharp claws, and can use wings as razor clubs that can split into four spears when thrown.
- Diyan:
  - Diyan Mark 1: Appears in episode 15. Powers include a pair of nunchucks, levitation, fire breath, ice breath, acidic melting beam, and head separation.
  - Diyan Mark 2: Appears in episode 15. Powers include three cable-linked diamond claws on the body, fire breath, ice breath, four diamond knuckle spikes on each hand, diamond teeth, regeneration, can combine its head horns to form a powerful boomerang, and a high resistance to heat such as lava.
- Drozden: Appears in episode 16. Powers include swimming, missile launchers in its fingers that can also fire small green flames, detachable scissors on the torso, regeneration even from decapitation, explosive grapple claw spikes on the pectorals, levitation, can cause whirlpools with its spiked tail, and mouth flames.
- Golemon: Appears in episode 17. Powers include three axes in each shoulder, flight, an extendable pendulum tail, knee spinning sais, reformation, and energy beams from the pectorals.
- Tarantu: Appears in episode 18. Powers include swimming, pink torso diamond beams called the Tarantu Death Beam, impaling electrical mouth webs, sword arms, barbed metal wire from the spinneret, levitation, three rockets in the abdomen, mandibles, four grapple legs on the abdomen, and a launchable sword in each shoulder. According to General Agyaru its power can rival that of 300,000 nuclear bombs.
- Great Conger: Appears in episode 19. He is a gorilla that escaped captivity and became a fossil beast. Original mass was 15 meters high and weighted 8 ton before becoming the fossil beast Gongu.
  - Gongu: Appears in episode 19. Powers include mouth flames, strong teeth that can chew projectiles, strength, and shoulder missiles.
- Dogcat: Appears in episode 20. Powers include a machine gun turret on its back with electrical dagger bullets, swimming, wrist and ankle buzzsaws, pectoral glue guns, a rainbow heat ray from the mouth, reinforced teeth, blade resistance, and burrowing.
- Muchiru: Appears in episode 21. Powers include iron teeth, twin maces with launchable spikes that regenerate after being used, extendable spiked whip tail, flight, hurricane winds from wings, electromagnetic rings called the Light Trap, energy absorbing with its tail, blade resistance, spiked torso rockets, and launchable arms.
- Mechanical Beast: Appears in episode 22. Powers include twin remote buzzsaws, powerful treads, three howitzer cannons, a large tank cannon, and submerging under and floating on top of water.
- Condorun: Appears in episode 22. Powers include flight, ultra sharp talons with launchable feet, blue mouth flames, launchable back knife, blue energy bolts from the antennae, rapid fire missiles in each side of its torso, projectile resistance, and regeneration for its feet.
- Bouga: Appears in episode 22. Powers include swimming, torso rockets, flight, a launchable clamp, and head scissors.
- Moguron: Appears in episode 23. Powers include burrowing, swimming, a giant nose drill, and three missile launchers on the back.
- Kamagira: Appears in episode 23. Powers include sword arms with chains on them, pectoral rockets, and launchable pendulum tail missiles.
- Reideen Robot: Appears in episode 23. Powers include a false God Breaker and armor similar to that of Reideen's Mutronium armor. It is used for training fossil beasts and was quickly destroyed by Kamagira.
- Kibango: Appears in episode 24. Powers include spawning mouth blizzards, a long extendable hook finger on each hand with freezing properties, explosive launchable tusks with needle missiles, levitation, a drill missile launcher for its belt buckle, and cutters from the abdomen. Unlike other fossil beasts it was created by Barao over ten thousand years before the time of the episode.
- Nibango: Appears in episode 24 and is a green colored clone of Kibango with all of the same powers.
- Modorosu: Appears in episode 25. Powers include surrounding itself in a giant fire ball, swimming, four missile launchers on the abdomen, drill missiles on the pelvis, rotating claw arms, flight, a mouth flamethrower, detachable wheels with spiked missiles, and buffalo horns that charge up with heat.
- Gameren: Appears in episodes 25 and 26. Powers include reviving the other fossil beasts, camouflage to the point of fusing with the environment, high jumping, a Chinese sword, an extendable tongue, and torso spike missiles.
- Ant Lion: Appears in episode 27. Powers include burrowing, eight torso cannons, eight extendable pincer arms, mandibles and fangs that emit electricity, blade resistant armor, and flight.

=== Colossal monsters ===
- Giant Sharkin: Appears in episode 27. Powers include a shield that acts like a buzzsaw, a rapier, hair missiles, and his cape will coil if torn from his body. Appears in various Super Robot Wars titles.
- Great Typhoon: Appears in episode 28. Powers include flight and cannons in both howitzer and machine gun style.
- Koka: Appears in episode 28. Powers include traveling in a whirlwind, a round shield on the left wrist that emits very hot electricity, invisibility, self bisecting, a larger spiked wheel that splits and impales enemies with spikes from both inner sides, drill missiles on the lower half, a harpoon for the right hand with five hidden mini harpoons, flight, twin missile launchers in the lower half, and two smaller spiked wheels on the lower half.
- Drillazer: Appears in episode 29. Powers include extendable drill arms, nine drill missiles hidden in the torso, and a giant drill rocket used for suicide attacks hidden in its body.
- Razar: Appears in episode 29. Powers include purple heat rays from the eye for its head with pinpoint accuracy, six lesser heat rays from the eyes on its palms, elbows, and knees that can blind humans and melt Mutronium, flight, agility, can increase its body temperature to the point of melting Mutronium, claw missiles in the shoulders and hips, and can fire a destructive rainbow beam from the energy in its seven eyes.
- Giltoio: Appears in episode 30. Powers include a mace on a rope and a buzzsaw in a round shield.
- Gamma: Appears in episode 30. Powers include buzzsaws for hands that emit heat, a wired pendulum in each hip, flight, mouth sonic waves, and a launchable saw on each shoulder.
- Dozu: Appears in episode 31. Powers include flight, launchable ax hands, and drills in the feet.
- Tetsdan: Appears in episode 31. Powers include flight, a restrainer explosive coffin hidden in the abdomen, a chained mace on each wrist, swimming, a three section launchable claw on its back that can turn into a chainsaw, blue lasers from the shoulders, and can launch its forehead spikes and nasal horn with them exploding on contact.
- Sokota: Appears in episode 32. Powers include a rocket launcher on each pectoral, four bladed edges in each arm, flight, and six needle missiles in each arm.
- Draiger: Appears in episode 32. Powers include spiked soles, strength that can throw enemies with enough force to make them spin, knee missiles, two drill missiles in the torso that will continually drill into an opponent's body, electrical bolts from the elbows that will cause the drill missiles to explode, flight, and thigh spike missiles.
- Yukimadendar: Appears in episode 33. Powers include a long whip tail, a mouth flamethrower in both heads, electric fangs, and coiling heads that constrict.
- Crash: Appears in episode 33. Powers include a spiked whip in each shoulder, flight, reformation, a large extendable drill in the torso, swimming, an extendable smaller drill in each pectoral, wrist spike missiles, electrical surges from the body, and if blown to pieces that turn into eleven humanoid robot that can disguise themselves as humans and the leader robot having electric hair, a blade in the right foot, and a buzzsaw in the left elbow, spike missiles from its mouth, four hand rockets in its body, and a drill in each arm.
- Gilanda: Appears in episode 34. Powers include heavy armor, flight, and body blades.
- Dodgergal: Appears in episode 34. Powers include six rocket launchers on its back, a mouth flamethrower, a chained mace for the right hand that emits electricity and fires the spikes like missiles, controlling severed body parts, reforming, and a drill bomb in the forehead.
- Hydra: Appears in episode 35. Powers include flight, spraying water from its body, a ninjato, and a crescent bladed staff that spins.
- Salamander: Appears in episode 35. Powers include mouth flames strong enough to reduce rock into cinder, claw missiles, a high body temperature with flame emission, a trident tail, flight, yellow eye heat beams, electrical bolts from the dragon mustache, launchable flaming abdomen scales, a missile launcher on each pectoral, and mutating liquid from the neck.
  - Salamander Hydra: Appears in episode 35. Powers include flight, slicing waves of water from the hands, armor strong enough to break weapons on contact and survive a ram attack from the God Bird, a ninjato that can slice through Mutronium, launchable crescent bladed staffs from the back, a mechanical tentacle in each shoulder with hidden drills in them. It is a combination of Hydra after being mutated by Salamander's mutating liquid and one of his flaming abdomen scales, but if the scale is damaged Hydra will revert to its normal form.
- Gabuss: Appears in episode 36. Powers include pendulum bladed arms and flight.
- Madanga: Appears in episode 36. Powers include a crossbow for the right hand that can morph into a drill, explosive lava arrows stored on its back with arrowheads that pierce through Mutronium, tank treads on the feet, flight, reformation as long as its human host Yurika has its core, can control its arms after they are severed, and a mouth flamethrower that can be used underwater. Appears in Super Robot Wars Compact 2 and Impact.
- Yurika: Appears in episode 36.She was a teenager who as a child was kidnapped by the Demon Empire and modified to possess the heart of the Colossal Monster Madanga. She convinced Gekido to Become Voluntarily a Colossal Monster and Sacrifice Herself to Defeat Madanga, and Save Akira and Reideen
- Zaikron: Appears in episode 37. Powers include swimming, a 10-tube missile launcher in the torso, flight, coiling treads in each shoulder that emit massive amounts of heat, reformation, and saw-like wheels on the hips.
- Matazu: Appears in episode 38. Its only known power is a launchable drill on a chain for its head.
- Dangus: A centipede-like colossal monster that fuses with objects around it, it possesses two different forms for battle and can swim or fly for quick escapes.
  - Form 1: Appears in episode 38. Powers include tank treads on the feet, a crane claw for the left arm, a mace on a wire for the right arm, reformation, and pink electrical bolts for the satellite dishes on its scalp.
  - Form 2: Appears in episode 38. Powers include swimming, torpedo launchers from the body, kamikaze planes used as projectiles, machine gun turrets all over its body, reforming, and coiling electric tendrils.
- Gandulas: Appears in episode 39. Powers include a trident and mouth flames.
- Gigar: Appears in episode 39. Powers include retracting into its tail, sharp claws, a rib cage-like set of blades that extend long distances, flight, invisibility, needle missiles from below the neck capable of shredding Mutronium, and a large blade resistant mace tail.
- Gudura: Appears in episode 40. Powers include body part separation, bladed segments, and can encase body parts in flames.
- JetCross: Appears in episode 40. Powers include dual heads on opposite sides of its body, strength, flight, explosive skin bits that act like homing mines, regeneration over the course of hours, a pair of rocket launchers in the torso, and using its body like a buzzsaw.
- Kibamata: Appears in episode 44. Powers include ice breath strong enough to create snow storms, ice breast missiles, a sword-trident hybrid staff, white eye ice beams, detachable constricting hair, and needle missiles on the scalp.
- Bigata: Appears in episode 44. Powers include levitation, mouth flames, saber teeth, twenty four torpedoes in the torso, and a pair of rockets on the back.
- Slado: Appears in episode 47. Powers include levitation, homing missiles, six fanged dragon heads, five saber toothed snake heads, and Mutronium piercing swords in the body.
- Grostan: Appears in episode 47. Powers include flight, a pair of buzzsaws on chains at the sides on its front, dual 3-tube rocket launchers on the front with the rockets having electrical rope for ensnaring, and yellow eye heat beams from the front head. Appears in Super Robot Wars Compact 2 and Impact.
- Biden: Appears in episode 48. Powers include flight, twin launchable spiked wheels on the shoulders, and a whip tail that fires electric bolts.
- Mongi: Appears in episode 48. Powers include flight, pectoral needle missiles, scalp spears, and drill fingers.
- Suneka: Appears in episode 48. Powers include flight, burrowing, twin mouth flamethrowers, and constricting with the aid of its body spikes.
- Bangor: Appears in episode 48. Powers include a large wheel used for floating on top of water, dual pectoral drills, abdomen missiles, flight, five extendable drills in each foot, a high resistance to sonic attacks, a coiling tread from his wheel, and a large cutlass. It is actually Gohrai after offering himself to become a colossal monster. Appears in Super Robot Wars Compact 2 and Impact.
- Baragon (not to be confused with the Toho monster of the same name): Appears in episode 49. Powers include flight, swimming, yellow eye beams, a double sided trident, spiked steel hair from the dragon head that can form a large pincer claw, mouth lava and flames, sharp talons, spike missiles from the side heads, a barbed machete, and a bladed nasal horn. Appears in Super Robot Wars Compact 2 and Impact.

==== Combined colossal monsters ====
- Gardon: Appears in episode 41. Powers include electrical bolts, flames, and missiles from the dragon head mouths, a pair of saw bladed round shields that can combine to fire a green electric beam, a whip with a mace at the end, a rather weak grenade launcher for the left hand that can barely damage an armored turret, a sword in the abdomen, flight, a whip tail, regeneration, and buzzsaws on the soles of the feet. It is a combination of two colossal monsters fused together by Barao named Gundon and Gildon. Appears in Super Robot Wars Compact 2 and Impact.
- Sand Killer: Appears in episode 42. Powers include acidic sand from the body, emitting hurricane-force winds, flight, x-ray vision, regeneration, adhesive cannons hidden in the forearms, can combine its sand and wind to create a sandstorm capable of destroying a city in a minute, pink energy beams from the turbines in its shoulders, and four missile launchers in the torso. It is a combination of two colossal monsters fused together by Barao named Sand and Storm.
- Shargon: Appears in episode 43. Powers include flight, a pair of missile launchers on each wing, drill talons, swimming, a shark mouth with drill teeth, and a tail flamethrower. It is a combination of two colossal monsters fused together by Barao named Condor and Shark.
- Bigada: Appears in episode 45. Powers include self bisecting, throwing stars on the shoulders, green tusk bolts, flight, a Chinese sword that fires lightning bolts, and spikes hidden in each bisected half. It is a combination of two colossal monsters fused together by Barao named Ondera and Shigidira.
- Gabiron: Appears in episode 46. Powers include flight, a pair of spiked tails that act like a buzzsaw, finger missiles, a mouth flamethrower from the dragon head, launchable bull horns from the head on the abdomen with them creating electrical bolts to start fires, six missiles in each shoulder, a chained ax on the back that can slice through Mutronium, a launchable jet pack, and a large howitzer cannon hidden in the neck and head. It is a combination of two colossal monsters fused together by Barao named Storigato and Starigalom.

== Cast ==
- Akira Hibiki: Akira Kamiya
- Mari Sakurano: Makoto Kousaka, Kiyoko Shibata
- Tarou Sarumaru: Ikuo Nishikawa
- Dan Araiso: Keisuke Yamashita
- Chikara (Riki) Jinguuji: Makio Inoue
- Ichiro Hibiki: Ichiro Murakoshi
- Princess (Queen) Lemuria/Reiko Hibiki: Misako Hibino
- Rei Asuka: Kotoe Taichi
- Koppe (Kohei Izu): Takako Sasuga
- Tobishun (Shunsuke Tobita): Hiroko Maruyama
- Nosuke (Shinnosuke Matsudaira): Kazue Komiya
- Ponta: Matsukane Yoneko
- Atchan (Ako Matsudaira): Matsukane Yoneko
- Daisaburou Higashiyama: Shojiro Kihara
- Prince Sharkin: Osamu Ichikawa
- Berostan: Kaneta Kimotsuki
- Barão: Junpei Takiguchi
- General Agyar: Taro Sagami
- Commodore Daldan: Tatsuyuki Jinnai
- Gohrai (Storm): Seizō Katō
- Gekido (Fury): Shozo Iizuka

== Staff ==
- Directors: Yoshiyuki Tomino (episode 1-25) and Tadao Nagahama (episode 26–50)
- Planning: Tohokushinsha and Asatsu
- Original story: Fuyunori Gobu (as Yoshitake Suzuki)
- Character design: Yoshikazu Yasuhiko
- Mecha design: Katsushi Murakami, Studio Nue (uncredited), Yoshikazu Yasuhiko (uncredited finishing)
- Storyboards: Yoshiyuki Tomino
- Animation director: Yoshikazu Yasuhiko, Norio Sioyama, Moriyasu Taniguchi
- Sound director: Toshio Saito
- Supervising sound production: Kazumi Numata
- Music: Akihiro Komori
- Produced by NET (now TV Asahi) and Tohokushinsha

== Production notes ==
- The series is renowned in Japan as the first to include a giant robot whose origins are mystical rather than scientific; Reideen itself is in fact portrayed as a sentient being. Reideen is also historically noteworthy for being one of the first transforming giant robots (Goldar, from Ambassador Magma, was an earlier character, although Goldar's transformation from robot to rocket ship was not a detailed mechanical transformation). The diecast toy version of Reideen, released in Japan in 1975 by Popy, was the first true transforming robot toy. Brave Reideen was the first anime mecha work of anime director and writer Yoshiyuki Tomino, better known as the creator of Gundam. The latter half was directed by Tadao Nagahama, and may be seen as a predecessor to his famous Robot Romance Trilogy, consisting of Combattler V, Voltes V and Daimos.
- This series was the second collaboration between writer/director Yoshiyuki Tomino and artist Yasuhiko Yoshikazu. The first work to feature both men was Wandering Sun (Sasurai no Taiyō) (1971). The two would later team up again for both Mobile Suit Gundam and Gundam F-91.
- "Reideen" was named after the sumo wrestler "Raiden Tameemon".
- According to RahXephon director Yutaka Izubuchi, the similarity of designs and powers of the title robots and the basic plots of RahXephon and Reideen are intentional.

A low-budget Korean film called Space Thunder Kids features a robot whose design appears to be a copy of Reideen's.

== Episodes ==
- 01. Gante, The Giant Dragon (大魔竜ガンテ)
- 02. Bastodon, The Giant Fossil Beast (化石巨獣バストドン)
- 03. Garda, The Iron Beast (鋼鉄獣ガーダ)
- 04. Giant Maddon Annihilates Tokyo (大マドン東京全滅)
- 05. Assault! Biira, The Ultrasonic Beast (強襲!超音獣ビイラ)
- 06. Recapture! The Hostages of the Giant Tortasu (奪回! 巨大トータスの人質)
- 07. Crush Skarl, the Replicating Beast! (分裂獣スカールを砕け!)
- 08. Counterstrike! Shiva, the Double-Headed Devil Beast (逆襲! 双頭魔獣シバ)
- 09. Terror! Manmo's Freezing Operation (恐怖! マンモーの冷凍作戦)
- 10. Showdown! The Lover of Jagar, The Fossil Man (対決! 化石人ジャガーの恋)
- 11. The Insurrection of Gildeen, The Assassin (殺し屋ギルディーンの陰謀)
- 12. The Strike of Algandos, The Fireball Beast (火球獣アルガンドスの痛撃)
- 13. The Love of Shuraga, The Beautiful Changeling (妖変美女シュラガの愛)
- 14. The Cave of Daakuru, The Devil Beast of Darkness (暗闇魔獣ダアクルの洞窟)
- 15. The Vengeance of Dian, The Jeweled Fossil Beast (宝石魔獣ダイヤンの復讐)
- 16. The Hell-Strike of Dorozuden, The Sea Dragon (海竜ドローズデンの地獄攻め)
- 17. The Immortal Goremon Rips The Devil To Shreads (不死身ゴーレモンの悪魔裂き)
- 18. The Heroic Agyaru's Deadly Blitzkrieg (壮烈アギャール必殺の電撃)
- 19. The Colossal Gonga: The Roar of Demonic Strength (巨獣ゴンガー魔腕の唸り)
- 20. Brutal! Devil Admiral Darudan (残忍! 悪魔提督ダルタン)
- 21. Assault! Trap of Muchiru, The Winged Beast (強撃!翼獣ムチールの罠)
- 22. Chaotic Attack! The Talons of Kondorun, The Devil Bird (乱撃! 魔鳥コンドルンの爪)
- 23. The Supernatural Scythe of Girah & The Thunderous Attack of Moguron (妖刀鎌ギラーと轟撃モグロン)
- 24. Supernatural Fists of Kibango, The Branching Devil Beast (分身魔獣キバンゴの怪拳!)
- 25. Conflagration of Modorosu, The Incandescent Beast (灼熱獣モドロスの炎)
- 26. The Wicked Gamereen's Infernal Charge (妖獣ガメレーン地獄の大進撃)
- 27. Fight The Devil Sharkin
- 28. Roughneck Big Beast of Hell!
- 29. Rzzar The Beast of Seven
- 30. Crushed Skull Gamba Samson
- 31. Tetsudan Upside Down Fear
- 32. Doraiga Heart-Breaking Operations
- 33. Veterinary Secrets of The Destroyer 11
- 34. Mysterious Secret Weapon Dodger Gal
- 35. Firedrake Salamander Flame Heat
- 36. Madanga Hell Shooter
- 37. Zaikuron Crashed Car Race
- 38. Dansguth Shattered The Magic Play The Beast!
- 39. Gigal Nails and Bizarre Wildlife
- 40. Cross-Killer Jet Black
- 41. Trap Combines Powerful Beast Gurdon
- 42. Sandstorm San Killer Fear
- 43. Shagon Animal Killer Combination
- 44. Kibanga Inferno Attack
- 45. Girumora Shears Devil Death
- 46. Gabiron One Death Demons
- 47. The Outraged Cries of Hell
- 48. The Lightning Australian Army Challenges
- 49. Barão's Last Wage
- 50. Shine! Reideen Immortal

== Remakes ==
=== Reideen the Superior ===
A 38 episode remake aired as Reideen the Superior (超者ライディーン; Chōja Raidīn) in 1996. This series was directed by Toshifumi Kawase. Five seemingly ordinary teenagers are actually armored superheroes called "Reideens" and their mission is to fight their enemy the so-called "Super Devils" who want to get their hands on a super robot called God Reideen. This series was notably different than the original, more akin to a Super Sentai series or Tekkaman Blade than the original Reideen and was designed to attract a female audience akin to Gundam Wing, Samurai Troopers and Dagwon.

=== Reideen ===
In January 2007, a twenty-six-episode series, simply titled Reideen (ライディーン; Raidīn), produced this time by Production I.G., was released. In this remake, Saiga Junki, a high school student with a gift in mathematics, learns that his archaeologist father, who disappeared years earlier, has died. When going to claim his remains at a pyramid dubbed "Japan's Pyramid", a meteor falls from the sky containing an evil life-form that seeks total destruction. Just as Saiga is put in danger by this life-form, the bracelet that his father left him reacts to the pyramid, and the titular robot is activated. It is now up to Saiga and Reideen to defend the Earth against the mysterious invaders.

== International release ==
Brave Reideen is considered the first super robot anime to reach a large U.S. audience directly. It was first broadcast in Honolulu, Hawaii on KIKU (channel 13), which ran the series with English subtitles created and produced in-house. The series first hit the mainland in March 1976, Friday nights at 6:00 P.M. on Los Angeles's KWHY-TV (channel 22) and at 8:00 P.M. on San Francisco's KEMO-TV (channel 20). Later in 1976, Brave Reideen began running on KMUV-TV in Sacramento, California (Sunday nights; timeslot to be confirmed), as part of the station's Japanese-American programming. The series also aired similarly in Chicago (station and dates to be confirmed), as well as broadcast as part of the Japanese programming on New York City's WNJU. The Stateside push was sponsored by Honolulu/Los Angeles-based Marukai Trading Co., Ltd., who distributed a large line of Japanese-produced merchandise (as well as some Hawaii-produced items, such as tee-shirts) to local retailers in localities airing Brave Reideen—including Popy's Jumbo Machinder (which may account for Mattel's launching of the popular Shogun Warriors line in the U.S.), according to author August Ragone.

== Merchandise ==
The original toy figures of Reideen (spelled "Raydeen") were introduced to the mainstream U.S. market as part of the Shogun Warriors toyline during the late 1970s under the Mattel brand, as well as the Marvel Comics book based on said toyline.

== Cultural impact ==
In December 1994 police found a pamphlet at the headquarters of Aum Shinrikyo that included a song called "Sarin the Brave", a parody of Reideen The Brave.

The Tubes recorded a song based on the show called "God-Bird-Change" written by Mingo Lewis in 1977. The stage show included dancers and the lead singer dressed as Reideen.

The anime series Crayon Shin-Chan parodied the series' theme song for its sixth opening theme.

Dan Briggs discussed the series, and provided illustrations, in Bradford G. Boyle's fanzine Japanese Giants, issue four.

Reideen would appear in the novel Ready Player One where it fights Mechagodzilla.
