= Shogun Warriors (toys) =

Line of toys by Mattel

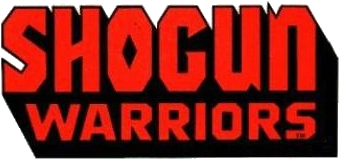
- Type: Action figures
- Invented by: Popy
- Company: Popy (Japan); Mattel (USA); Toynami (2010)
- Country: Japan
- Availability: 1977–80, 2010 (revival)
- Materials: Plastic
- Features: Giant robots and monsters, including Great Mazinger and Godzilla

Shogun Warriors was a line of action figures released by Mattel in North America from 1977 to 1980. The line consisted of several imported figures based on Japanese anime mecha.

The line was drawn from toys originally produced by Japanese company Popy, based on several anime and tokusatsu shows featuring giant robots. They were originally manufactured in three sizes: 24-inch (610 mm) plastic versions, 3.5-inch (89 mm) die-cast metal versions, and slightly taller but much more detailed 5-inch (127 mm) die-cast versions. Many of the robot's original names were altered, such as Getter Dragon (Dragun) and Great Mazinger (Great Mazinga). Several vehicles were also offered, as well as a set that could be put together to form the super robot Combattler V (here renamed Combattra). Later on in the line, Mattel introduced toys of Godzilla and Rodan.

The toys featured spring-loaded launcher weapons such as missiles, shuriken and battle axes. Some were able to launch their fists, while the later die-cast versions also had the ability to transform into different shapes. Reideen (here renamed Raydeen), for example, could become a birdlike spaceship. These "convertible" versions were in a sense the precursors to the Transformers line of toy robots. Toward the end of production, Mattel proposed the inclusion of plastic toy vehicles for the 3.5" figures to ride in exclusively in the United States, but these toys were never released for purchase.

Similar to other toylines during the 1970s, the Shogun Warriors toys came under pressure over safety concerns regarding their spring-loaded weapons. The concern was that children might launch the weapons and hit other children or pets in the eyes. There was also a risk that small children might choke on the small plastic missiles and other parts. Toy manufacturers then faced new regulations as a result of reported injuries received while playing with these toys. Consequently, many toy companies were forced to remodel existing toy lines with child-safe variations such as spring-loaded "action" missiles that would remain attached to the toy. Missiles were also reshaped to have a flat head instead of a pointed one. Because of this, as well as declining sales, the Shogun Warrior toyline was discontinued by 1980.

== Tie-in media ==
=== Comic ===
In order to promote the toys, Mattel approached Marvel Comics to produce a comic tie-in for the range, having enjoyed a fruitful relationship with the company on Godzilla, King of the Monsters. Only three figures would be featured in the comic - Raydeen (originally from Reideen the Brave); Dangard Ace (from Wakusei Robo Danguard Ace) and Combatra (from Chōdenji Robo Combattler V). Series artist Herb Trimpe would also produce some artwork used by Mattel on toy advertisements.

=== Cartoon ===
Due to Shogun Warriors being based on characters drawn from a wide number of Japanese TV shows, there was no cartoon produced, but several of the characters featured in the toy line appeared in Jim Terry's Force Five series.

== Toyline ==
=== Jumbo Machinders ===
Jumbo Machinders were 24-inch (610 mm) tall vinyl figures.

- Daimos
- Dragun
- Gaiking (Note: A modified version of this figure was released exclusively in a Sears Christmas catalog as "Zargon".)
- Godzilla
- Goldorak
- Mazinga
- Raydeen
- Rodan

=== Die-cast action figures ===
5-inch (130 mm) figures.

- Dragun
- Mazinga
- Poseidon
- Raider

=== Two-In-Ones ===
5-inch (130 mm) figures that could be reconfigured between two modes.

- Daimos
- Dangard
- Gaiking
- Grandizer
- Raydeen
- Voltus

=== Collector's ===
3-inch (76 mm) figures.

- 17
- Combattra
- Dangard
- Dragun
- Gaiking
- Grandizer
- Great Mazinga
- Leopaldon
- Poseidon
- Voltes V

=== Action vehicles ===
Vehicles with action features.

- Bazoler
- Dangard Launcher
- Diamos Truck
- Grand Car
- Grandizer Saucer
- Heli-Capter
- Jet Car
- Kargosaur
- Kondar
- Liabe
- Nessar
- Rydoto
- Shigcon Jet
- Shigcon Tank
- Sky Arrow
- Sky Jet
- Solar Saucer
- Varitank
- Vertilift

=== U-Combine Combatra vehicles ===
Five vehicles that could be combined to form the super-robot Combattra, they were sold both separately and as a boxed set.

1. Battle Jet
2. Battle Clasher
3. Battle Tank
4. Battle Marine
5. Battle Craft

== In popular culture ==
Several Shogun Warriors appeared in the Wonder Woman episode "The Deadly Toys" at a toy shop run by Frank Gorshin's character.

Mazinger and Raideen (called Mazinga and Raydeen) appeared in the MAD sketch "Regular Shogun Warriors", a parody of the toyline and Regular Show.

== Revival ==
In 2010, Toynami revived the Shogun Warriors name with a new toy line consisting of 24-inch (610 mm) Jumbo Machinder toys. The giant robots in this line were from Voltron and Robotech. The line also featured the robot Bender from Futurama and the movie monster Godzilla.

- GoLion
- Dairugger
- VF-1J
- VF-1S
- Bender (Note: While Bender is not a giant robot, he did appear gigantic in the "Terror at 500 Feet" segment of the Futurama episode "Anthology of Interest I".)
- Godzilla
