= Machine Robo Rescue =

Japanese anime television series

- 出撃!マシンロボレスキュー
- Genre: Mecha
- Created by: Hajime Yatate
- Developed by: Hideki Sonoda
- Directed by: Mamoru Kanbe
- Music by: Naoki Satō
- Country of origin: Japan
- Original language: Japanese
- No. of episodes: 53

Production
- Producers: Norio Yamakawa (TV Tokyo); Toru Usuko; Kyotaro Kimura; Naotake Furusato
- Production companies: TV Tokyo; Yomiko Advertising; Sunrise

Original release
- Network: TXN (TV Tokyo)
- Release: January 8, 2003 – January 3, 2004

Machine Robo Rescue (出撃!マシンロボレスキュー, Shutsugeki! Mashin Robo Resukyū) is a 2003 Japanese mecha anime television series produced by Sunrise. It is the third installment of the Machine Robo anime trilogy, which is based on the toyline by PLEX and Bandai. It is directed by Mamoru Kanbe (Cardcaptor Sakura) and written by Hideki Sonoda (Machine Robo: Revenge of Cronos). It aired on TV Tokyo from January 8, 2003, to January 3, 2004, having a total of 53 episodes.

== Storyline ==
In the future, age is not a factor in determining whether an individual can perform a certain task, only special talent and training. The Machine Robo Rescue (MRR) organization has been established so that robots and children can become partners and rescue people from danger. Twelve children with various abilities have been selected and introduced as part of the Robo Rescue program. Life as one of the children chosen as part of the MRR has just started for Taiyou Oozora. Difficult training lies ahead for the MRR team in order for them to protect many people's lives.

== Characters ==
The twelve children are divided into three teams according to their particular field of rescue. These Machine Robos together with their Robo Masters (RM) can unite with various Support Robos but only with the permission of their RMs which can be transmitted through their K-Boys, which are communicator cellphone Machine Robo.

=== Red Wings ===
The Red Wings were the first of MRR's rescue teams. They were designated as experts on fire and aerial rescues. The team's color is red and their symbol an open hand, which is the "paper" sign. Their emblem shows wings on either side of a diamond shape. This team is headed by Instructor Musashi.

Taiyou Ozora (大空 太陽, Ōzora Taiyō)

voiced by: Sayaka Aida, A Robo Master of Jet Robo and Shuttle Robo, Taiyou is an aerial rescue specialist. Described as a "natural survival" rescuer, he possesses an innate ability to survive and sense danger, Taiyou is an orphan following a plane crash that killed his parents four years before he joined MRR and which he survived. He was the only survivor rescued by the Rescue Red robot. He is the leader of the Red Wings team along with Ace, usually reckless and likes to tackle problems head-on. Sometimes, he relies too much on his ability which costs him the rescue. Later in the series, he was assigned to a place called Sabah for International Hyper Rescue located in Africa. He has a pet dog called Bone.

Arias "Ace" Honou (エリアス 炎, Ariasu Honō)

voiced by: Naomi Shindō. Robo Master of Fire Robo and a fire fighting and prevention specialist, his father is a fireman and expert on situations involving fire disasters. Ace is the type of person who is knowledgeable, acts like he wants to do everything by himself and lets his teammates rely on him. At the start of the series, he is usually seen competing with Makoto, Daichi, and most of all Taiyou. He also volunteered to be one of the instructors of the next MRR generation.

Kai Kitazawa (北沢 海, Kitazawa Kai)

voiced by: Chihiro Kusaka. Co-pilot of the Red Wings' Wing-Liner transport he acts as backup for Red Wings together with Rin and the pair help their teammates during rescues. He is a somewhat smart guy who knows a lot and is usually calm among the Red Wings. Later in the series, he and Jay were both assigned to space for International Hyper Rescue, where they live in a satellite.

Rin Haruka (遥 鈴, Haruka Rin)

voiced by: Kumiko Higa. Main pilot of Wing-Liner; proxy Red Wings Robo-Master; mountain rescue specialist. She is half-Japanese half-Chinese. She is the only person who is not acrophobic among the members when it comes to practice. She provides backup for the Red Wings together with Kai. After the experimental Gura Gorros were used in a particular rescue mission, (later renamed the Gura Gorro Rescue Squad), she became the robo master of the three Gura Gorros. She was assigned to Paris for International Hyper Rescue. She has a crush on Taiyoh, which she does not want Taiyou to know.

=== Blue Sirens ===
The Blue Sirens were the second rescue team of MRR. This team handles police situations, road accidents and situations involving the capture of criminals. The team's color is blue and the team's symbol is a peace sign made with the hand. The sign also stands for "scissors". The team emblem has police lights at the top, an olive branch on either side, and a black tire in the middle. The Blue Sirens are headed by Instructor Koshiro.

Makoto Aikawa (愛川 誠, Aikawa Makoto)

voiced by: Chihiro Kusaka. Robo Master of Police Robo, Makoto is a combat natural from a family of police officers. He is very strict with his teammates sometimes and is usually called the "cold guy" because of his upright manner and his following of the rules to the letter. Later on in the series, he leaves Machine Robo Rescue to gain more experience in rescue and being a policeman. He also took the Police Robo and the Bike Robos with him.

Susumu Utada (歌田 進, Utada Susumu)

Voice: Masato Amada (Michael Shitanda). Robo Master of Gyro Robo and twin brother of Tsuyoshi, mechanic and engineering specialist. Being Tsuyoshi's twin, Susumu knows exactly what his brother is thinking and doing at all times. Susumu is the machinery expert among the twins. Later, both he and his brother are assigned to New York for International Hyper Rescue.

Tsuyoshi Utada (歌田 強, Utada Tsuyoshi)
Voiced by: Masato Amada (Japanese); Chuck Powers (English).
Co-pilot of the Blue Sirens' Siren-Galley transport and twin brother of Susumu, mechanic and engineering specialist. Being Susumu's twin, Tsuyoshi knows exactly what his brother is thinking and doing at all times. Later, both he and his brother are assigned to New York for International Hyper Rescue.
Alice Beckham (アリス・ベッカム, Arisu Bekkamu)

voiced by: Yukana Nogami,. Main pilot of the Blue Sirens' Siren-Galley transport. She is a former child actress and now the MRR public relations liaison. The main backup for the Blue Sirens, she has a crush on Makoto, proven when she got jealous when Makoto went on a date with Aki. She also volunteered to be one of the instructors of the next MRR generation.

=== Yellow Gears ===
The last rescue team of MRR. Their specialty is extreme rescue situations involving earthquakes, debris, building collapses and underwater rescues. The team's color is yellow and the team's symbol is a closed hand, which is the "rock" sign. The team emblem has two gears on either side of an embedded plate. They are headed by Instructor Marie.

Members:

Daichi Hayami (速水 大地, Haiyami Daichi)

voiced by: Risa Hayamizu. Robo Master of Drill Robo, Daichi has high spatial awareness, which allows him to accurately estimate distance and dimension by just looking at a distance or object. He is usually shy and his stomach hurts before a rescue. He left Machine Robo Rescue later in the series to help Professor Suidoubashi in developing the new Machine Robos. He also owns the company where the new parts for Machine Robos are built hence Professor Suidoubashi addressing him as "Company President".

Shou Ashikawa (芦川ショウ, Ashikawa Shō)

voiced by: Robo Master of Submarine Robo, Shou is a sea and underwater rescue specialist and the best swimmer among the members. They are the happy group of MRR, with Sho and Ken, making people laugh and smile so as to forget their problems and believe in the quote "Laughter can Save the World." He also volunteered to be one of the instructors of the next MRR generation.

Sayuri Suizenji (水前寺 小百合, Suizenji Sayuri)

voiced by: Akiko Kimura. Main pilot of the Yellow Gears' Gear-Dump transport and medical specialist. She is a "therapy natural", which gives her the ability to instill calm to anyone she talks to although this ability is not mentioned until episode 44. She is the main backup of the Yellow Gears along with Ken. She later leaves MRR to develop laws to make International Hyper Rescue more responsive.

Ken Minami (美波ケン, Minami Ken)

voiced by: Megumi Masato. Co-pilot of the Gear Dump and proxy Yellow Gears Robo-Master. He is one of the backups for the Yellow Gears together with Sayuri. He sometimes acts in a feminine manner. He met a ghost pirate girl named Nina which follows him but is not determined whether they still contact each other. He later becomes the official doctor for the next MRR generation.

=== MRR Stealth ===
This team was formed by Jay and V-Stealth Robo and specializes in air, land and space combat. The team's color is violet and the team's symbol is a hand with a finger pointing northwest and a thumb pointing northeast. The team emblem is the same with the emblem of V-Stealth Robo, featuring a simple drawing of the vehicle mode of V-Stealth Robo with lightning striking it.

Jay (ジェイ, Jei)

voiced by: Hisafumi Oda. Real name: Junior. Robo Master of V-Stealth Robo and formerly an agent of Disaster for Kaiser-G until reformed and accepted into the MRR. He is a combat specialist and also a "survivor natural" like Taiyou. His past is unknown but it is believed he was involved in space exploration when he was a baby. He was the only survivor from an accident that happened in space where he was sent out in an escape pod and found by an exploration team. He was sent to an orphanage then captured by the Disasters. He was brainwashed and trained to be a warrior. Later on in the series, he and Kai were both assigned to space for International Hyper Rescue.

=== MRR Staff and other characters ===
Musashi Miyajima (宮島 武蔵, Miyajima Musashi)

Voice: Hiroomi Sugino. One of the Instructors of Machine Robo Rescue, he has a hard headed attitude but sometimes a good heart. He is in charge of the Red Wings.

Koshiro Sasaki (佐々木 古志郎, Sasaki Kōshiro)

Voice: Ryotaro Okiayu. The second Instructor of Machine Robo rescue. He is a calm, cool guy but can become upset when trainees get into trouble. He is in charge of the Blue Sirens.

Marie Bitou (尾藤 マリー, Bitō Marie)

Voice: Yukana Nogami. The third and only female instructor of Machine Robo Rescue, she is the daughter of founder Brad Bitou and always calls her father "Chief" sometimes. She is in charge of the Yellow Gears.

Brad Bitou (尾藤 ブラッド, Bitō Brad)

Voice: Kazuhiro Nakata. The founder of MRR, he is one of the developers of the Machine Robos along with Tohru Suidohbashi. He was also involved in the creation of Kaiser-G and the subsequent disaster it caused.

Tohru Suidohbashi (水道橋 徹, Suidōbashi Tōru)

Voice: Kazuma Horie. The main developer of the Machine Robos. He and Brad worked together and founded MRR after the Stealth Robo activation incident.

Bone (ボン, Bone)

Voice: Naoki Yanagi. Taiyo's pet dog and a pure bred Saint Bernard. He is also a survivor of the same plane crash that killed Taiyo's parents.

=== Disasters ===
The Antagonist Group in the series. They were led by Kaiser-G and interfered with the activities of MRR.

Cap.Hazard

voiced by: Kenji Nojima. Kaiser-G's right-hand man, he is a psychopath who wants to create more disaster and bring chaos to humans. He was defeated by the MRR before Kaiser-G was fully activated.

Kaiser-G

The Leader of the Disasters and the one who adopted Jay as a baby. He is a powerful supercomputer created by Brad Bitou that went berserk several years later. His goal is to create the worst disaster on the planet through an asteroid crashing into the Earth. He was ultimately defeated by Taiyoh, Jay, Machine Commander Robo V and Shuttle Robo.

== Mecha ==
=== Machine Robo ===
- MR-01L Jet Robo/MR-S01L Shuttle Robo

Robo Master: Taiyoh Ohzora

Taiyoh's Machine Robo Partner, he is one of the special Machine Robos built for Aerial Rescues and sometimes help put out fires along with the Sky Robos. In Vehicle mode, he resembles a jet while he resembles blue Jet when he is in Robo Mode. When he was defeated by Stealth Robo out in space and crash landed on earth, he was remodeled for space rescues to beat Stealth Robo and to perform space rescues, he became Shuttle Robo and commanded the Space Robos instead of the Sky Robos . With Taiyo's command, Jet Robo can combine with the Sky Robos to form Hyper Jet Robo or Shuttle Robo can combine with the Space Robos to become Hyper Shuttle Robo. His special attacks are Jet Puncher as Jet Robo and Shuttle Puncher and Beam Anchor as Shuttle Robo.

Jet Robo's Design is maybe based on Blue Jet from Machine Robo: Revenge of Cronos.

- MR-04L Fire Robo

Robo Master: Arias "Ace" Honoh

Ace's Machine Robo Partner, he specializes on putting out fires. In Vehicle Mode, he reassembles a Fire Truck. In Robo Mode, he carries two water guns that puts out certain fires. In Hyper mode, both water guns were mounted on the shoulders. He has the ability to put out fires with water and foam. He is also the only leader robo with ladies as his supporter robos. Ace gives the command to Fire Robo and the Aider Robos to combine to become Hyper Fire Robo. His special attack is Hydro Splasher.

- MR-05L Police Robo

Robo Master: Makoto Aikawa

Makoto's Machine Robo Partner, he is an expert on the road and on capturing criminals. He has a strong sense of Justice and knows what is wrong and what is right. In Vehicle Mode, he resembles a police car. In Hyper Mode, his chest area looks like Supercar Robo. When Makoto gives the command, Police Robo and the Bike Robos combine to form Hyper Police Robo. His special attack is Back Fire.

- MR-02L Gyro Robo

Robo Master: Susumu and Tsuyoshi Utada

Susumu and Tsuyoshi's Machine Robo Partner, he also has a strong sense of Justice like Police but a bit too much. He was sent to MRR after the New York incident. He is sometimes cocky. He is also the only robo with 2 robo masters. In Vehicle Mode, he resembles a Gyro Jet. In Robo Mode, the Gyro wings became arms which he also use for flying. When either both Susumu and Tsuyoshi gave the command, Gyro Robo and the Helicopter Robos combine to form Hyper Gyro Robo. His special attack is Gyro Shooter.

- MR-03L Drill Robo

Robo Master: Daichi Hayami

Daichi's Machine Robo Partner, he is the odd ball of the group. Sometimes acting like a Kabuki performer, he is specially designed to drill through the earth and performs extreme rescue situations. In one episode, it reveals that he was not built for underwater conditions. He is, in fact, the strongest among the leader robos. In Vehicle Mode, he resembles a Drill Tank. In Robo Mode, he somehow has a strange resemblance to Rod Drill. Daichi gives the command to him and the Dozer Robos to form Hyper Drill Robo. His special attack is Drill Attack.

Just like Jet Robo, his design is also based on Rod Drill from Machine Robo: Revenge of Cronos.

- MR-06L Submarine Robo

Robo Master: Shoh Ashikawa

Sho's Machine Robo Partner, he is the Machine Robo who specializes in Underwater Rescues. He has a cool accent and can understand with the animals of the ocean and he really loves the ocean. In Vehicle Mode, he resembles a Submarine/Powerboat Hybrid. In Robo and Hyper modes, he is like Police Robo except for the different features and design. When Sho gives the command, Submarine Robo and the Aqua Robos combine to form Hyper Submarine Robo. His special attack is Bubble Smash.

- MRX-00L Stealth Robo/MR-V00L V-Stealth Robo

Robo Master: Jay

He was the Original Machine Robo who all the Machine Robo were based on. When he is activated once, he almost destroyed the facility so he was deactivated until the Disasters got a hold of him and Jay chose him to be his Robo Master. Originally, Stealth Robo is colored purple in all Vehicle, Robo and Hyper Modes and can unleash powerful beam blasts and missiles when he is Hyper Stealth Robo. But after Jay left the Disasters, the MRR repaired as well as remodeled him to become V-Stealth Robo, now colored white with purple accents. He may have the same ability as his former self but the 4 Tank Robos (which were destroyed by BL Hyper Drill Robo) that combine with him were replaced with a special booster wing pack that combines with V-Stealth Robo to form Hyper V-Stealth Robo. Also, he has ability to combine with Machine Commander to form Machine Commander Robo V. His special attack is Burst Tempest. Fitting his name, he can turn invisible. His vehicle resembles an F-117 Stealth Fighter.

=== Transporters ===
- TMR-01WL Wing Liner

Pilots: Rin Haruka, Kai Kitazawa

The transport unit of the Red Wings. It resembles a set of bullet train. It carries Fire Robo and the Aider Robos to their chosen destinations. It is the tallest among the transporters when in Robo mode as the front and back carriage become the legs. But when Rin and Kai manually activates its Robo Mode, it becomes Wing Liner Robo.

- TMR-02SG Siren Galley

Pilots: Alice Beckham

Blue Siren's Transport unit. It reassembles an armored van in Vehicle mode. But when Alice or either Susumu or Tsuyoshi manually activates its Robo Mode, it becomes Siren Galley Robo.

- TMR-03GD Gear Dump

Pilots: Sayuri Suizenji, Ken Minami

Yellow Gear's Transport unit. It is the shortest of all the transporters of the MRR. It reassembles a Haul Truck in Vehicle mode, which is pretty huge. But when Sayuri and Ken activates its Robo Mode, it becomes Gear Dump Robo.

- TMR-04MC Machine Commander

The last Transporter of the MRR and the only one equipped with sentient AI. It was composed of 3 units: the TMR-04MC1 Red Commander, TMR-04MC2 Blue Commander and TMR-04MC3 Yellow Commander. Each Designated Leader Robo goes inside each commander and all 3 commander combines into Machine Commander or Machine Commander Robo. Also, the unit has a special ability to combine with V-Stealth Robo to become Machine Commander Robo V. His special attacks are Zone Release and Mighty Flash as Machine Commander Robo and Sprinkler Shield and Dual Tornado in V mode.

=== Disasters ===
- Gura Gorros

These are units created by Kaiser-G to interfere Machine Robo Rescue's duties. After Kaiser-G is defeated, 3 of them were trained and assigned to Rin Haruka as the Gura Gorro Rescue Squad for International Hyper Rescue

- BL Fire Robo/Hyper BL Fire Robo

The first of the Black Machine Robos created by the disasters. He is the black/violet version of Fire Robo who uses fire instead of water. The most popular among the BL Robos for he is usually seen fighting in the series, he was destroyed by Machine Commander Robo V. His special attack is Burning Storm.

- BL Police Robo/Hyper BL Police Robo

Second of the Black Machine Robos and a black version of Police Robo. He was the last to be destroyed and by Machine Commander Robo. His special attack is Exhaust Bomber.

- BL Drill Robo/Hyper BL Drill Robo

The last of the Black Machine Robos who is the brown/olive version of Drill Robo. He was defeated by Stealth Robo using Jet Robo's parts. His special attack is Power Crusher.

All three of the Black Machine Robos were in command of Col. Hazard using his black K-Boy.

=== Guest Units ===
- Air Leon - Appeared in the Two-Part Special, it was a special Mugenbine Machine Robo enlisted in the MRR.

== Theme songs ==
- Go! Go! Rescue (GO!GO!レスキュー) BY JAM Project (OP)
- March of Rescue Hero (マーチ オブ レスキューヒーロー) BY JAM Project (ED)

== Related links ==
- Machine Robo
- Machine Robo: Revenge of Cronos
- Machine Robo: Battle Hackers
- Machine Robo Mugenbine
