= Robo Machines =

Robo Machines may refer to:

- Robo Machines (comics)
- Robo Machines, a toyline also called Robo Machine

== See also ==
- Machine Robo, a Japanese toyline, the basis of "Robo Machine" and "Robo Machines"
