= Godaikin =

Toy line

Godaikin or GoDaiKin (a combination of gokin (合金, "alloy") and dai (大, "big"/"great")) was a line of Super Robot toys released by Bandai America from 1982 to 1985, composed of figures from Popy-created series such as Chogokin and Popinika.

== History ==
Mattel had previously tried to market Popy's figures as Shogun Warriors in the late 1970s, before the line was cancelled, partially due to safety concerns. In 1982 Bandai decided to try themselves, and came up with the Godaikin range. The name is presented as "GoDaiKin" on the packaging (however, within collectors' sources, the title case version is more commonly used).

Popy selected ten of their most popular Deluxe (short: DX) Chogokin figures for release in North America for 1982 - these typically varied between 10 and 12 inches in height in robot mode and came in large boxes with carrying handles on the sides. Bandai America had no American facilities for manufacturing the figures, instead shipping the toys from Japan in styrofoam to their New Jersey-located US Headquarters where they were placed inside the new boxes. The toyline's tagline was "An innovative series of super robots". Unlike most toys of the time, the figures did have their wide selection of spring-loaded weapons left intact for the Western releases, which had only mild variations from the Japanese releases; Bandai's decision to aim the toys at an older audience may have been a factor in allowing them to circumvent safety laws.

The large size of the toys, the expense of their construction and the freight costs of shipping them over to America led to the toys being prohibitively expensive for many children (some having a retail price of around US $80), and sales were poor. For the second series of Godaikin figures, Bandai introduced a smaller range of figures alongside the next batch of Deluxes. The Standard Godaikin were all around 6 inches tall, and some were smaller versions of Deluxe figures released the same year. Some of these were actually DX Chogokin due to their features, but were bracketed as standard figures in America due to their size. Bandai also released some toys from the Big Scale Ships range to tie in with the figures.

However, in the face of competition from cheaper lines such as Transformers and Gobots, Godaikin still failed to take off. Unlike these series, Godaikin had no tie-in media to promote it outside of a single promotional comic seen in 1986 catalog, as the robots were drawn from a wide number of diverse anime and tokusatsu series. Some of these had been shown in America previously in different forms, but none were actively tied into the Godaikin brand.

The line would continue with infrequent releases for another couple of years, largely repackaging overstock from Japan, where the Super Robot market was suffering something of a decline. Godaikin figures regularly ended up reduced in an attempt to sell, and large numbers of unsold units were shipped on to Europe and Australia, where they were repackaged once more and sold as part of Bandai's Robo Machine and Machine Men ranges respectively.

While a commercial failure, the line introduced many collectors to high quality Japanese toys, and now good condition examples fetch large amounts on the second-hand market.

== Toys ==
=== Series 1 (1982–1983) ===
Number	Figure	Source
77053	Combattra	DX Combattler V from Chōdenji Robo Combattler V
77020	Daltanius	DX Daltanius from Future Robo Daltanius
77047	Gardian	DX Gordian from Gordian Warrior
77124	God Marz	DX Godmars from Six God Combination Godmars
77045	God Sigma	DX God Sigma from Space Emperor God Sigma
77126	Goggle V	DX Goggle Robo from Dai Sentai Goggle V
77070	Golion	DX Golion from Beast King GoLion
77065	Sun Vulcan	DX Sun Vulcan Robo from Taiyo Sentai Sun Vulcan
77601	Tetsujin 28	SG Tetsujin 28 from Tetsujin 28-go
77052	Voltes V	DX Voltes V from Chōdenji Machine Voltes V

Golion would later find much greater fame as the star of the cartoon series Voltron: Defender of the Universe. Combattra was the only toy previously released in North America, as part of Shogun Warriors.

=== Series 2 (1984) ===
Number	Figure	Assortment	Source
300013	Bio Man	Standard	ST Bio Robo from Choudenshi Bioman
300021	Bio Man	Deluxe	DX Bio Robo from Choudenshi Bioman
302091	Bio Dragon	Vehicle	Big Scale Bio Dragon from Choudenshi Bioman
377033	Daidenjin	Standard	DX Daidenjin from Denshi Sentai Denjiman
	Daitetsujin 17	Standard	DX One-Seven from Daitetsujin 17
	Daimos	Deluxe	DX Daimos from Tōshō Daimos
372461	Dyjupiter	Ship	Big Scale Dy Jupiter from Kagaku Sentai Dynaman
377165	Dynaman	Standard	ST Dyna Robo from Kagaku Sentai Dynaman
300006	Dynaman	Deluxe	DX Dyna Robo from Kagaku Sentai Dynaman
	Leopaldon	Standard	DX Leopaldon from Spider-Man

=== Series 3 (1985–1986): "Godaikin Forces" ===
Number	Figure	Assortment	Source
301001	Abega	Vehicle	DX New Super Abega from Lightspeed ElectroGod Albegas
	Daileon	Standard	ST Daileon from MegaBeast Investigator Juspion
	Daileon	Deluxe	DX Daileon from MegaBeast Investigator Juspion
	Dancougar	Standard	ST Dancougar from Dancougar - Super Beast Machine God
	Dancougar	Deluxe	DX Dancougar from Dancougar - Super Beast Machine God
301008	Machine Dolphin	Vehicle	DX Machine Dolphin from Nebula Mask Machine Man
300023	Laserion	Standard	ST Laserion from Video Warrior Laserion
300025	Laserion	Deluxe	DX Laserion from Video Warrior Laserion
300024	Vavilos	Standard	ST Vavilos from Space Sheriff Shaider
300028	Vavilos	Deluxe	DX Vavilos from Space Sheriff Shaider
