= Popy =

Japanese toy manufacturer of the 1970s and early 1980s

- Native name: ポピー
- Type: Subsidiary
- Industry: Toys
- Founded: 1971; 55 years ago
- Defunct: 1983; 43 years ago
- Fate: Merged into Bandai
- Parent: Bandai

Popy (Japanese: ポピー) was a Japanese toy manufacturer of the 1970s and early 1980s. The company was owned by Bandai. It was founded in 1971 and merged back into the parent company in 1983. The company is best known for its groundbreaking Chogokin robot figures.

== History ==
Popy was formed by Bandai in July 1971 to distribute products intended for candy shops and other retail outlets outside of the usual toy stores. Before long, the company began to license characters and vehicles from popular live-action (Tokusatsu), Anime and Manga series. Its first major success in this vein was a child-sized version of the "Henshin Belt" worn by the hero of the Kamen Rider television series. Although other companies were selling similar products, only Popy's incorporated a light-up mechanism, making it a smashing success despite its then-high retail price of 1500 yen. (It would eventually go on to sell some 3.8 million units.) In the wake of the success of the "Henshin Belt", Popy introduced a palm-sized, diecast metal version of the bike ridden by the show's title character. It proved a major success as well and paved the way for a massive wave of vinyl and diecast metal renditions of characters from the Japanese kids' shows that dominated the Japanese toy market for more than a decade. Other notable successes included the Jumbo Machinder series and the Chogokin series of diecast metal robot toys, most notably those of Super Robot characters such as Mazinger Z.

Popy's divisional system would later be reinstated and after going through Toy Division 1 and Character Toy Division, it was inherited by the current Boys Toy Division. As mentioned above, it stopped handling girls' characters and started handling toys purely for boys, so it was not a pure successor to Popy, but in a reorganization in July 2019 it was reorganized into the Brand Design Department, which handles character toys regardless of gender, and in February 2022 it was reorganized into the Brand Toy Division, and in April 2024 it was reorganized into the current Toy Division.

In 1974, Popy began manufacturing action figures from the anime Mazinger Z and had them released using die casting technology which became a huge hit for the subsidiary, catapulting the unit into the spotlight. Since then, a series of character figures from anime and special effects works have been released under the "Chogokin" brand

In the beginning of March 2003, the Popy brand was revived when its parent Bandai merged its subsidiary Yutaka with its garage kit division B-Club to form a new subsidiary bringing back the Popy name . However four years later in 2007, when Popy and Bandai's parent Bandai Namco Holdings announced its restructuring, Popy was folded back into its parent Bandai into its subsidiary Plex whilst retaining the Popy brand.

== Chogokin ==
Perhaps Popy's most enduring legacy, the Chogokin (named after a fictional "superalloy" from the animated Mazinger Z series) diecast metal "action figures" caused a sensation when first released in Japan. The very first entry in the series, the GA-01 Mazinger Z, was a 4.5-inch figure that featured a zinc alloy torso, shoulders, and legs, with spring-actuated firing fists and an injection-moulded plastic head. At the time, diecast metal was mainly used for vehicular toys such as cars and aeroplanes, and there was some worry that a figural diecast toy would not sell. It proved a massive hit, establishing the Chogokin as the cutting edge of Japanese character toys. Popy would then adapt a number of robots from a slew of Anime shows, including Raideen, Getter Robo, Tetsujin 28, Dangard and Daimos. In 1979, the code sequence switched from "GA" to "GB" after 99 figures, and the toys became more complex. Several figures, such as Godmars, Golion and Dairugger XV were available in multiple versions – typically an "ST" version of around 5-6 inches, and then a DX version around twice the size that had additional features such as separating or transforming into vehicles. Robots adapted in this range also included those from Gold Lightan, Goggle V, Ulysses 31 and Dynaman.

== Other toys ==
The PB series covered Popinika toys, which were based on vehicles from licensed lines Popy had licensed, including Machine Hayabusa and Thunderbirds. These releases continued under the code PC from 1980, which covered series such as Space Cruiser Yamato.

Popy attempted to counter falling sales of robot toys with the so-called Chokinzoku range – 16" diecast figures with a wide array of features. Only one, Tetsujin 28, was produced due to the huge cost, though it is now a prized collectable among fans. Big Scale Ships – large vehicles to fit the 5-6" Chogokin figures – were also developed.

Popy also initiated the Machine Robo '600 Series' and 'Scale Robo' DX ranges.

== Bandai merger ==
With the sales of robot toys falling, Popy was reincorporated into Bandai in March 1983. However, many of their lines would continue, with Chogokin continuing to come out in the GC series until 1988, and Popinika continuing to be used until 1987.

== Outside Japan ==
Popy designs were used in a variety of lines outside Japan, usually without the company's name being used. In the late 1970s, Mattel had licensed a selection of figures for their Shogun Warriors range with qualified success. Bandai's American and European arms distributed several figures under the brand name Godaikin (with the latter later using Robo Machine umbrella) in the early 1980s. In 1983, Tonka licensed Machine Robo designs for their Gobots franchise – most of the major characters such as Cy-Kill, Turbo and Fitor were based on Popy designs. Perhaps the best-known 1980s export of Popy was World Events Productions' Voltron series, which used the Popy figures Golion, Dairugger XV and Arbegas as the Lion, Vehicle and Gladiator Voltrons respectively.

Popy also produced some designs modelled on North American wrestlers, including a young Hulk Hogan.

== Legacy ==
Despite a relatively short life, Popy had vindicated the idea of merchandising toys from popular series, something that continues to be a mainstay of the action figure market to this day. They had also been responsible for raising the production standard of toys with the inclusion of diecast and top quality plastic – their method was soon taken up by competing manufacturers such as Takara and Takatoku. The brand name itself has become a sign of quality for modern-day toy collectors.

The toys featured several other innovative features – Raideen is often considered the first transforming toy, and thus a precursor of the world-famous Transformers line. The same toy also introduced the idea of a predominantly black 'premium' recolour, an idea which has since become a recurring theme in many toylines, especially those in Japan.

Popy designs are also the source of Bandai's successful 'adult' line, Soul of Chogokin.
