= Daitetsujin 17 =

- Title card
- Genre: Tokusatsu; Superhero; Kyodai Hero; Super Robot
- Created by: Shotaro Ishinomori
- Developed by: Shozo Uehara; Masaru Igami
- Directed by: Minoru Yamada
- Starring: Masahiro Kamiya; Midori Takei; Tadao Nakamaru; Go Haraguchi; Shungo Mitsui; Naoyuki Sugano; Junko Otsuki; Masahiro Takashina; Hitoshi Takahashi; Mayumi Watanabe; Kaho Shimada; Akihiko Hirata; Rinichi Yamamoto; Akira Yamaguchi; Ulf Otsuki; Rushia Santo; Mio Ota
- Voices of: Hiroshi Mizushina; Mieko Muramatsu; Kyoji Kobayashi
- Country of origin: Japan
- Original language: Japanese
- No. of episodes: 35

Production
- Production companies: Toei Company; Ishimori Productions

Original release
- Network: MBS
- Release: March 18 – November 11, 1977

Daitetsujin 17 (大鉄人17, Daitetsujin Wan-Sebun, "Giant Ironman 17") is a 1977 tokusatsu series created by Shotaro Ishinomori and produced by Toei. It revolves around a giant battle robot commanded by a young boy who fights the giant robots of an evil organization bent on world conquest. It is similar to Giant Robo in premise and how it ends.

The opening theme was performed by Ichirou Mizuki, Koorogi '73 and The Chirps.

Popy manufactured several toys based on the series - notably a transforming Chogokin version of the robot One-Seven (later released in America for the Godaikin line), vehicles based on One-Seven's Flying Fortress mode, the Sub Machine Flying Car, the Shigcon Tank and the Shigcon Jet, and a three-inch version of One-Seven, which was later released as "17" in Mattel's Shogun Warriors line.

== Story ==
Brain is the world's greatest computer, and also the most intelligent being on planet Earth. One day, Brain decides to abandon its terrestrial moorings, and it is up to The Red Mufflers to track it down. Unfortunately, Brain has developed an amazing army of deadly giant robots, including one with a huge "17" emblazoned on its chest-plate, with which it plans to subjugate its creators. A young boy whose family was killed by Brain's followers manages to activate Daitetsujin 17, which thereafter comes to his rescue whenever he is in danger from Brain's minions.

== International broadcast and home video ==
- In its home country of Japan, the first two episodes were released on VHS on January 21, 1986, as well as preview edits. Then a laserdisc release was released from November 21, 1996, to July 21, 1997, containing all 35 episodes and spread a total of 5 volumes with 2 discs each, with 8 episodes in each volume (The last volume only holds 1 disc and 3 episodes). Then from September 21 to November 21, 2006, the series was released on DVD spreading through 3 volumes, each holding 2 discs with 12 episodes each (the last volume holding only 11). The "Knowledge Corner" that was broadcast at the time of the series' being broadcast was not included. The first episode is included in the "Shotaro Ishinomori 70th Anniversary DVD-BOX" released on July 21, 2008. All three DVD volumes were released on July 12, 2017, as part of the Toei TV Tokusatsu New Price Series to Commemorate Shotaro Ishinomori's 80th Birthday.
- In the United States, the series received an English dub and featured several episodes edited into a TV movie shown in the region under different titles, including The Defenders and the Great Brain and Brain 17 in 1982.
- In Thailand, the series received a Thai dub entitled hoon hlek mai lek sib-chet (หุ่นเหล็กหมายเลข 17, "iron robot no.17") on Channel 7 on Saturdays and Sundays from 10:00 a.m. to 10:30 a.m. in 1985.
