= List of GoBots characters =

This is an alphabetical list of GoBots characters with information on their appearances, fictional biographies and histories.

== Bad Boy ==
Bad Boy is one of Cy-Kill's minions. A former Guardian Gobot, Bad Boy is a rough street punk always ready with an insult and looking for a fight. He is actually smarter than he lets on, preferring to let others underestimate him.

Like most Gobots, Bad Boy can change form. His alternate mode is a combat jet, specifically a Fairchild A-10 Thunderbolt. He also has hand-blasters. His built-in repair systems can repair most injuries to his body if given enough energy.

=== Animated series ===
Bad Boy appears in the animated series Challenge of the GoBots. He is prominently featured in the episode "Wolf in the Fold", where he goes undercover within the GoBots under the alias Heat Seeker.

=== Fun Publications ===
Bad Boy is a main character appearing in Withered Hope, a text and comic based story. Sent to investigate the effect the destroying their universe six Gobots are reformatted to look like an Autobot and Decepticon and sent through the Interfacer to the source of the disturbance - the 22nd level. They accidentally arrive on Transtech Cybertron, where they are kept against their will in the city of Axiom Nexus. While on Cybertron, Bad Boy becomes friends with the Malignus gang. The remaining Gobots encounter the Transtech Decepticon General Demolishor in a criminal investigation but are aided by Airazor, Crystal Widow, and Cheetor. The Gobots receive upgrades from the shop of Swindle and are able to leave the dimension thanks to stolen transit passes they obtain.

=== Toys ===
Two toys were produced for Bad Boy. The first was released as a Gobot, based on the Machine Robo line from Japan. The second was a recolor of the Transformer Powerglide, released in Japan as an ehobby exclusive.

== Blaster ==
Blaster, also known as RocketMan, is a Guardian Gobot who turns into a missile launcher.

Blaster appears in the Challenge of the GoBots episode "The Third Column" where he works in a Guardian weapons facility that was attacked by the Renegades. The attack was turned away by automated defenses.

== Bug Bite ==
Bug Bite is a Renegade who has also appeared in the Transformers franchise as a recolor of Bumblebee. Bug Bite is also a Yellow VW Beetle like Bumblebee, but larger and he carries a blaster that attaches to his cabin in car mode.

== BuggyMan ==
BuggyMan is a Renegade Gobot and former Guardian Gobot who turns into a dune buggy. Some media refers to him as "Buggy Boy".

=== Animated series ===
BuggyMan appears in Challenge of the GoBots, voiced by Robert Ridgely.

== Cop-Tur ==
Cop-Tur is a blue helicopter robot in the employment of Cykill. He is featured in a children's book with Crasher and Cykill in an adventure where they first come to Earth, allying with a human with his own plans for world domination.

== Crasher ==
Crasher is a Renegade Gobot with the alternate mode of a black race car. She is employed by Cykill and obsessed with destruction. Crasher resembles a Group C style race car from the 1980s.

== Creepy ==
Creepy is a renegade loyal to Cy-Kill who turns into a scorpion-like monster.

=== Animated series ===
Creepy, Scorp and Vamp aided Stron-Domez the Master Renegade from escaping his imprisonment by Cy-Kill on Roguestar.

=== Comics ===
Creepy appeared in the story "Scooter's Mighty Magnet" as one of Cy-Kill's minions.

=== Toys ===
While a purple version of Creepy was sold in stores, a special green version was offered as a mail-away exclusive by sending in UPCs from four Gobots.

== Dozer ==
BulldozerMan, or simply DozerMan, Bulldozer or Dozer, originally appeared as one of the names in a word find that had to be solved to win a copy of the Challenge of the Gobots video game from Your Sinclair magazine. Dozer also appears in Challenge of the GoBots.

== Dumper ==
Dumper is a Guardian Gobot with the alt mode of a dump truck.

=== Reception ===
Dumper was chosen as the 9th goofiest Gobot name by Topless Robot.

=== Animated series ===
The Guardians set up a lab to test their power suits on Earth. Cy-Kill, Cop-Tur, Crasher, Geeper-Creeper, Pincher, and Snoop attack the lab, but are confronted by Leader-1, Baron Von Joy, Blaster, Dozer, Dumper, Road Ranger, Scooter, Scratch and Turbo. Although the Guardians are initially winning the battle, an accidental backfire from Baron Von Joy's weapon allows the Renegades to escape.

=== Books ===
Dumper was featured in the 1986 children's book Collision Course Comet - Robo Machine Featuring The Challenge Of Gobots where he fought the Renegade Gobot Crasher.

=== Toys ===
- Gobots Dumper (1983)

== Geeper-Creeper ==
Geeper-Creeper is a Renegade Gobot and former Guardan Gobot who works for Cy-Kill. His alt mode is a Mitsubishi Jeep CJ-3B.

=== Animated series ===
Geeper-Creeper appears in Challenge of the GoBots, voiced by Bob Holt.

== Grungy ==
Grungy is a Power Warrior and the Renegade copy and brother of Courageous forged by Renegade-augmenting Power Suits and their central spaceship.

=== Reception ===
Grungy was chosen as the 3rd goofiest Gobot name by Topless Robot.

== Herr Fiend ==
Herr Fiend is an evil Renegade scientist who speaks with a thick German accent. His alternate mode of a Porsche 928 is identical to the Decepticon Transformers named Dead End.

=== Animated series ===
In Challenge of the GoBots, Herr Fiend is named "Doctor Go". In the episode "Doppleganger", Cy-Kill has Go program robot duplicates of the Guardians using recordings he made of the real Guardians. When demonstrating the Space Bender weapon to Unicom, Leader-1 learns that the Renegades are attacking Washington. The Renegades ambush Leader-1 and replace him with his duplicate. Leading the Command Center back to Gobotron and getting rid of Scooter and Small Foot, the Renegades then release duplicates of Path Finder, Rest-Q, Van Guard and Turbo. Small Foot and Scooter capture the Turbo duplicate and learn where their friends are being held. Cy-Kill then replaces Good Night. Using the duplicate Turbo the Guardians infiltrate the Renegade base, free the captured Guardians and escape from Spoons and Fitor. Although blocked by the Renegades, Scooter uses a hologram of Zod to make the Renegades flee. Making it back to Gobotron the Guardians are attacked by the Guardian duplicates. The real Guardians are able to defeat their duplicates with the aid of the real Zeemon, Hans-Cuff and Rest-Q. Cy-Kill then arrives in the Thruster with more duplicates, but Small Foot is able to stop with robots using the Space Bender device.

== Hornet ==
Hornet is among the Renegade Gobot forces who aided Magmar on the planet Quartex.

== Leader-1 ==
Leader-1 is the name of several fictional characters from the Go-Bots, Robo Machines and Transformers media properties. In the GoBots universe, Leader-1 is the leader of the Guardians. In the Transformers universe, Leader-1 was the partnered Mini-Con to Megatron. Leader 1 is also the designation for an American transforming model kit that transforms into an Alpha Fighter from Robotech Anime, and is white/ light grey in color, requiring glue to assemble.

== Loco ==
Gobot-Loco
- Challenge of the Gobots and Robo Machines character
- First appearance: "Conquest of Earth"
- Last appearance: "Et Tu, Cy-Kill"
- Japanese name: Steam Robo
- Release number: GB-05

In-universe information
- Species: Gobot
- Gender: Male
- Abilities: Energy blasts, flight, shapeshifting, superhuman durability, superhuman strength
- Affiliation: Guardian Gobot (formerly), Renegade Gobot (currently)
- Alternate mode: JNR Class D51

Loco is one of the soldiers of Cy-Kill. His alt mode is a JNR Class D51.

=== Animated series ===
Loco was a long-serving Renegade, fighting in the defence of the Renegades' fortress on Gobotron. He appeared sporadically after that, most notably helping the cyborg arms dealer Trident hijack a shipment of UNICOM materials.

=== Eagle Comics ===
Loco appeared in the Eagle Comics story The Robo Machines. He is a member of the Renegade Robo Machines working for Strom Domez.

=== Toy ===
Loco's toy was a re-release of the Machine Robo Steam Robo figure (MR-05). It was first issued in 1983, and was available until the end of 1984. It was also released in Europe.

== Monstrous ==
Monstrous is a Renegade made up of six Renegades who combine into a monstrous form.

== Night Ranger ==
Night Ranger, also known as HarleyMan, is a Guardian Gobot who turns into a police motorcycle. This toy was the inspiration for the Transformers character Backtrack.

=== Reception ===
Night Ranger was chosen as the 10th goofiest Gobot name by Topless Robot.

== Pincher ==
Pincher is a Renegade Gobot spy.

=== Animated series ===
Pincher appears in Challenge of the GoBots, voiced by Peter Cullen. Cy-Kill, Cop-Tur, Crasher, Geeper-Creeper, Pincher, and Snoop attack a lab, but it is defended by Leader-1, Baron Von Joy, Blaster, Dozer, Dumper, Road Ranger, Scooter, Scratch and Turbo. Although the Guardians were winning the battle, an accidental backfire from Baron Von Joy's weapon allows the Renegades to escape.

== Psycho ==
Image of Psycho from the toy patent

Duke Psycho is a Renegade technologist. He was changed into a GoBot, along with his partners Cobra and Lady Andromeda, in the manga series Cobra, which later became the anime series Space Cobra.

=== Animated series ===
Psycho makes minor appearances in the Challenge of the GoBots episodes "The Battle for Gobotron" and "The Gobotron Saga". He also appears on the cover to the VHS release of "Cy-Kill's Shrinking Ray".

=== Books ===
Psycho is ordered by Cy-Kill to issue the Renegade retreat.

== Pumper ==
Pumper is a Guardian who turns into a fire engine and served on Command Center 6.

=== Reception ===
Pumper was chosen as the 8th goofiest Gobot name by Topless Robot.

== Puzzler ==
Puzzler is a Renegade Gobot made up of six other Renegade cars who combine into one gigantic robot.

Puzzler was initially solicited as a Guardian.

=== Animated series ===
Puzzler appears in "Auto Madic" episode #28, where the Guardians don Power Suits to form the Power Warrior Courageous, which defeats Puzzler.

== Rest-Q ==
Rest-Q is a Guardian medic. His alt mode is an ambulance.

=== Animated series ===
Rest-Q appears in Challenge of the GoBots, voiced by Frank Welker. In "It's The Thought That Counts" episode 6 Scooter is briefly captured by the Renegades. After being freed Rest-Q checks out Scooter, but Scooter refused to be examined, secretly being brainwashed by the Renegades. Rest-Q appeared in "Ultra Zod" episode 14, where he donned a Power Suit and helped form the Power Warrior Courageous, which defeated Ultra Zod. In "Doppleganger" episode 23 leading the Command Center back to Gobotron and getting rid of Scooter and Small Foot the Renegades then released duplicates of Path Finder, Rest-Q, Van Guard and Turbo. Later the real Guardians were able to defeat their duplicates with the aid of the real Zeemon, Hans-Cuff and Rest-Q. Rest-Q appeared in "Cy-Kill Escapes" episode 41. He repaired Hans-Cuff, who was injured in the Renegade prison break. In "The Fall of Gobotron" episode 43 Rest-Q repaired Small Foot. Rest-Q appeared in "Flight to Earth" episode 44. Captured by the Renegades, Rest-Q was not even allowed to repair the other prisoner Guardians, instead being threatened by Twin Spin with his blades. He was later rescued by Scooter and Sparky.

Rest-Q appeared in GoBots: Battle of the Rock Lords.

=== Eagle Comics ===
Rest-Q appeared in the Eagle Comics story The Robo Machines. He is a member of the Security Force Robo Machines.

== Road Ranger ==
Road Ranger is a Guardian Gobot who turns into a flatbed trailer truck. Road Ranger is one of the Guardians Go-Bots, he later disguises himself as an Autobot. Road Ranger's alternate mode is that of a semi-trailer truck. He can fly in robot mode and has hand-mounted blasters.

=== Animated series ===
Road Ranger first appears in "Wolf in the Fold" episode #30 of Challenge of the Gobots.

Road Ranger appears in "The Third Column" episode #42, where he works in a Guardian weapons facility that was attacked by the Renegades. The attack was turned away by automated defenses.

In episode #58, "It's The Thought That Counts" Cy-Kill, Cop-Tur, Crasher, Geeper-Creeper, Pincher, and Snoop attack the lab, but it is defended by Leader-1, Baron Von Joy, Blaster, Dozer, Dumper, Road Ranger, Scooter, Scratch and Turbo. Although the Guardians are initially winning the battle, an accidental backfire from Baron Von Joy's weapon allows the Renegades to escape.

=== Fun Publications ===
Road Ranger has a cameo in Transcendent which occurred at the same time as Withered Hope.

Road Ranger, is a main character appearing in Fun Publications fiction Withered Hope, a text and comic based story. Sent to investigate the effect the destroying their universe six Gobots are reformatted to look like an Autobots and Decepticons and sent through the Interfacer to the source of the disturbance - the 22nd level. They accidentally arrive on Transtech Cybertron where they are kept against their will in the city of Axiom Nexus. Bug Bite escapes without his allies using an astro beam device. The remaining Gobots run afoul of the Transtech Decepticon General Demolishor in a criminal investigation but are aided by Airazor, Crystal Widow and Cheetor. The Gobots receive upgrades from the shop of Swindle, Swindle and Swindle and are able to leave the dimension thanks to stolen transit passes they obtain. Once they arrive on Earth of the 22nd level where they find Bug Bite and his new Decepticon allies Weirdwolf and Dreadwind.

=== Books ===
Road Ranger appeared in the 1985 Robo Machine book The Wagner Sirens.

=== Eagle Comics ===
Road Ranger appeared under the name Truck in the Eagle Comics story The Robo Machines. He is a member of the Security Force Robo Machines.

=== Toys ===
- Gobots Road Ranger (1984)

Turns into a semi-truck with flatbed.

- Generation 1 Mini-Vehicle Road Ranger (2004)

Road Ranger is an e-hobby exclusive. He is a redeco of Generation 1 Huffer.

== Scooter ==
Scooter is one of the three main protagonists of Challenge of the Gobots. He transforms into a motor scooter. He is also very quick and light and mostly a scout type character with a friendly nature.

== Scorp ==
Scorp is a Renegade Gobot loyal to the Master Renegade.

=== Animated series ===
Scorp appears in Challenge of the GoBots, voiced by Paul Eiding.

== Small Foot ==
Small Foot is a Guardian Gobot who is one of Leader-1's most trusted soldiers. A tracker, what she lacks in size she more than makes up for in heart and determination. Small Foot can often be seen kicking around with Scooter but she idolizes Leader-1 and is often found fighting by his side. Trouble often finds her wherever she is. Sometimes with all of her determination Small Foot becomes impulsive and eager to please the older and more experienced Guardian soldiers.

In robot mode, she can fire energy shots from the two lamps on her chest. She converts into a Toyota Hilux SR5. She uses a tow cable with a hook in both modes.

=== Animated series ===
Small Foot appears in Challenge of the GoBots, voiced by B. J. Ward.

=== Fun Publications ===
Sent to investigate the effect the destroying their universe six Gobots (including Small Foot) are reformatted to look like an Autobot and Decepticon and sent through the Interfacer to the source of the disturbance - the 22nd level. They accidentally arrive on Transtech Cybertron where they are kept against their will in the city of Axiom Nexus. Bug Bite escapes without his allies using an astro beam device. The remaining Gobots run afoul of the Transtech Decepticon General Demolishor in a criminal investigation but are aided by Airazor, Crystal Widow and Cheetor. The Gobots receive upgrades from the shop of Swindle, and are able to leave the dimension thanks to stolen transit passes they obtain. Once they arrive on Earth of the 22nd level where they find Bug Bite and his new Decepticon allies Weirdwolf and Dreadwind.

Small Foot has a cameo in Transcendent which occurred at the same time as Withered Hope.

=== Toys ===
- Gobots Small Foot (1985)

Turns into a Toyota Hilux.

- Generation 1 Mini-Bot Small Foot (2004)

Small Foot is an e-hobby exclusive. She was a redeco of Generation 1 Gears.

== Spay-C ==
Spay-C the Gobot-Shuttle is a Guardian Gobot who turns into a Space Shuttle.

== Spoons ==
Spoons is one of the soldiers of the Renegade leader Cy-Kill. He turns into a forklift. Spoons was the inspiration for the Transformers Decepticon Deadlift.

=== Animated series ===
Spoons appears in the episode #23, called "Doppelganger". He worked with Doctor Go (aka Herr Fiend) in transporting a robot duplicate of Leader-1 the doctor had created. Later when the Guardians are escaping Renegade capture Fitor and Spoons try to stop them, but fail.

== Staks ==
Staks is the ruler of the Guardians who turns into a semi-trailer truck.

=== Animated series ===
Staks appears in the Challenge of the GoBots episode "Auto Madic".

== Tank ==
Tank is one of Cy-Kill's minons. His great physical strength and firepower mean he is often used to support the Renegades' operations. Tank is larger than most Gobots, and has considerable firepower. In tank mode, he can drive through walls or over cars without it even slowing him. His physical attributes are outweighed by his low intelligence.

=== Animated series ===
Tank appears in Challenge of the GoBots, voiced by Peter Cullen. He first appeared in the series' pilot.

He was placed in command of the mind-controlled US. Army during Cy-Kill's first attempt to invade Earth, but was unable to successfully hunt down Turbo and Scooter in New York. Soon afterwards, he returned to Gobotron and was captured along with the other Renegades based in their fortress.

=== Eagle Comics ===
Tank appeared in the Eagle Comics story The Robo Machines. He is a member of the Renegade Robo Machines working for Strom Domez.

== Tork ==
Tork is a Guardian and one of the Secret Riders who turns into a Ford Ranger.

=== Reception ===
Tork was chosen as the 5th goofiest Gobot name by Topless Robot.

== Treds ==
Image of the Treds from the US patent for his second toy

Treds, also spelled "Treads", is one of the Guardian Gobots. He was featured in a 1986 Gobots commercial where he was named as one of the new Guardians along with Mr. Moto. He turns into a M1 Abrams tank, and later a M551 Sheridan light tank.

=== Animated series ===
Treds appears in "Et Tu Cy-Kill?" episode #60, where he and Tri-Trak help Leader-1's team track down the Renegades on an alien planet.

=== Fun Publications ===
Treds is a main character appearing in Fun Publications fiction Withered Hope, a text and comic-based story. Sent to investigate the effect the destroying their universe six Gobots are reformatted to look like an Autobot and Decepticon and sent through the Interfacer to the source of the disturbance - the 22nd level. Treds was chosen to imitate a Decepticon so he could keep an eye on the Renegades Bad Boy and Bug Bite. They accidentally arrive on Transtech Cybertron where they are kept against their will in the city of Axiom Nexus. Bug Bite escapes without his allies using an astro beam device. The remaining Gobots run afoul of the Transtech Decepticon General Demolishor in a criminal investigation but are aided by Airazor, Crystal Widow and Cheetor. The Gobots receive upgrades from the shop of Swindle and are able to leave the dimension thanks to stolen transit passes. Once they arrive on Earth of the 22nd level where they find Bug Bite and his new Decepticon allies Weirdwolf and Dreadwind.

Treds has a cameo in Transcendent which occurred at the same time as Withered Hope.

=== Toys ===
Two toys were produced for Treds. The first was released as a Gobot. The second as a Transformer, which was a recolor of the Autobot Warpath.

== Turbo ==
Turbo is one of the three main protagonists of Challenge of the Gobots. He transforms into a supercar. Turbo is badly damaged in the children's book where they first arrive on Earth when Leader-1 takes and brings three astronauts to their base and repair him.

== Vamp ==
Vamp is a female Renegade Gobot who works for Cy-Kill. She can fire blasts of energy from her eyes.

Vamp and Scooter were featured on the cover of issue #2 of the Gobots Magazine.

=== Animated series ===
Creepy, Scorp and Vamp aided the Master Renegade from escaping his imprisonment by Cy-Kill on Roguestar.

=== Comics ===
Vamp appeared in the story "Scooter's Mighty Magnet" as one of Cy-Kill's minions.

=== Eagle Comics ===
Vamp appeared as Casmodon in the Eagle Comics story The Robo Machines. He was one of the Devil Invaders.

== Zeemon ==
Zeemon is a leading member of the Guardian Gobots. His alt mode is a Nissan 280ZX.

=== Animated series ===
Zeemon appears in Challenge of the GoBots, voiced by Frank Welker. He is among the leaders of the Guardians planning to stop the Renegades. Due to animation errors the Renegade Herr Fiend appears identical to Zeemon in the pilot series.

Zeemon appears in "Lost on Gobotron" episode #11. Zeemon appears in "Genius and Son" episode #17. He plans to surrender the planet to Cy-Kill to avoid it being destroyed by the Renegade. In "Doppleganger" episode #23, the real Guardians were able to defeat their duplicates with the aid of the real Zeemon, Hans-Cuff and Rest-Q. Zeemon appears in "Nova Beam" episode #54 working with Staks and Pathfinder on Gobotron when information came in that the sun of the planet Nirolac had become unstable.

== Zod ==
The Zod Monster is a fictional character in the Gobots and Machine Robo story and toy line.

Zod is a giant, even among his fellow Gobots. Savage and bestial, he is one of Cy-Kill's pets and most powerful weapons. Zod is considered the Godzilla-like deity of the Gobots. Zod has a toy that approaches in a lurching motion and can only be stopped by pushing the red button on his chest, deactivating the battery operation and stopping him in his tracks.

=== Animated series ===
Zod is left on Gobotron during Cy-Kill's initial trip to Earth. He orders Fitor to not use Zod against the Guardians, as he will have use of him later.

The Power Warrior Courageous defeats Ultra Zod.

Scooter used a hologram of Zod to make the Renegades flee.

=== Robo Machines ===
In the Eagle comic strip Robo Machines, Cy-Kill performed an operation on his master to convert him into Zod. Zod attacked the Command Centre, shooting down Royal-T, and later killing Carry-All. Zod still possessed the intellect of Stron-Domez, and was able to design the Devil Invaders, and oversee construction of the first Casmodon. However, soon after his stabilisers were disabled after being attacked by the Security Forces, and Cy-Kill abandoned him.

=== Toys ===
- Gobots Zod

A motorized toy. Came with a lance that could deactivate him by pressing a button on his chest.

== See also ==
Lists of Transformers characters
