= The Robo Machines =

British comic book story

- An early advertisement for "The Robo Machines" comic strip.

Publication information
- Publisher: IPC Magazines
- Schedule: Weekly
- Title(s): Eagle; 10 November 1984 to 15 March 1985; 29 March to 29 July 1985
- Formats: Original material for the series has been published as a strip in the comics anthology(s) Eagle.
- Genre: Science fiction
- Publication date: 10 November 1984 – 29 July 1985
- Main character(s): Leader-1; Cy-Kill

Creative team
- Writer(s): Tom Tully
- Artist(s): Mario Capaldi; Kim Raymond
- Editor(s): Dave Hunt

The Robo Machines is a British comic strip, appearing in titles published by IPC Magazines. The story was published in the anthology Eagle from 10 November 1984 to 29 July 1985, written by Tom Tully, with art by Mario Capaldi and later Kim Raymond. Based on Bandai's Robo Machine toys, the story depicts an attack on Earth by evil scientist Stron-Domez and his evil Robo Machines.

== Creation ==
The comic strip was one of several from Eagle based on a line of toys; others include Manta Force, Starcom: The U.S. Space Force and Roadblasters. The story was written by the experienced Tom Tully, an IPC stalwart best known for his run on Roy of the Rovers. The Robo Machine toyline had previously been advertised on the cover of another IPC magazine, appearing on the cover of 2000 AD Prog. 329 in August 1983, advertising a competition for the toys. At the time, the Challenge of the GoBots cartoon series had not been shown in Britain and the Eagle strip featured considerable plot differences.

== Publishing history ==
The story was published between 10 November 1984 to 15 March 1985, and 29 March to 29 July 1985 - with a two-week break when Eagle incorporated the contents of the cancelled Tiger. Mario Capaldi drew the first episodes, with Kim Raymond later taking over.

Shortly after the strip ended, one of the Robo Machines characters was later used by artist José Ortiz as a robot in Dan Dare, also written by Tully. An exhibition of Capaldi's work, including 20 panels from the strip, was displayed at the Dorman Museum in the late artist's hometown of Middlesbrough in 2015.

== Plot summary ==
Robotron is a planet in the Proxima System, where the inhabitants are very scientifically advanced people who through cybernetics are now 99% machines themselves and robots are used in every walk of life. A power-hungry scientist named Stron-Domez the Master Renegade has modified two criminal Robo Machines - Cy-Kill and Tank - so they can transform into vehicles. After an unsuccessful attempt to assassinate the President of Robotron, Stron-Domez takes his creations to Earth, which he had identified as being rich in minerals to build more transforming Robo Machines. The Robotron Guardian Security Forces dispatch Ex-El and a group of volunteers in pursuit aboard the spaceship Command Centre, with plans to modify his volunteers in the same fashion. Stron-Domez dispatches Cy-Kill, Tank and new creation Fitor to the town of Cholkham in East Anglia, which they begin to destroy. Ex-El's creations Leader-1, Hans-Cuff and Dozer arrive in time to drive them off, but the town has suffered many casualties, including the deaths of the parents of Charlie Bampton, a young boy who possesses ESP. This skill makes him useful to the Security Forces, and the chance to end Stron-Domez's threat gives Charlie a reason to help them. After a botched contact with the British Army, the Security Forces track Stron-Domez to an electronics factory in Birmingham, where he has taken the workforce hostage and forced them to build more Robo Machines for him. The Security Force robot Truck and Charlie are able to free the humans, and the Security Forces move in and rout Stron-Domez' forces. Stron-Domez is able to escape on Cy-Kill when the police arrive on the scene, though all his other troops are captured and disabled by the Security Forces.

With most of his Robo Machines deactivated by the Security Forces, Stron-Domez experiments upon himself, and is able to modify his body so he becomes the massive robot Zod. This attracts the Security Forces but Zod is able to attack the Command Centre, and force it into retreat. However, the Security Forces robot Carry-All accidentally tracks them to their junkyard base, only to be mortally wounded by Zod. At the junkyard, Zod and Cy-Kill have recruited a group of destitute humans to build them more Robo Machines – Zod's planned Devil Invaders. Carry-All's signals attract the Security Forces with only one Devil Invader - called Casmodon - built. On board the Command Centre, Charlie has a premonition of great danger for the Security Forces, and persuades minder Scooter to follow them. The premonition is correct – the massive Casmodon is incredibly powerful, and in a pitched battle on the edge of London easily holds off the Security Forces attack, inflicting heavy losses on both them and the human population. Casmodon also captures Charlie, but while inside the Robo Machine, he is able to destroy vital circuitry, temporarily disabling his captor. The Security Forces then retreat to the Command Centre and withdraw to Robotron to regroup, taking Charlie with them. Cy-Kill swears to build an army and invade the planet himself.
