= Chogokin =

Toy brand

Chogokin (超合金, Chōgōkin; Chō: Super, gōkin: alloy) Sometimes spelled either Chougokin or Cho-gokin is a fictitious material which first appeared in Go Nagai's Mazinger Z manga and anime and is later adopted by Popy in 1972 as the name of a new line of die-cast metal robot and character toys sold in Japan. The first of these is "GA-01" Mazinger Z, which, in spite of questionable engineering that led Popy to offer a free replacement campaign, ignited a craze that changed the face of the Japanese toy industry in the 1970s. Bandai, Popy's parent company, continues the Chogokin line to this day, branded under their own name.

== Vintage Chogokin ==
Chogokin toys were generally produced in ST (short for "standard" and usually in the range of 5" in height) or DX ("deluxe" and usually much larger; additionally this class of Chogokin product usually came with more features such as separating parts and more complex weaponry, usually with launching projectiles (which are usually fists as a tribute to Mazinger Z as the first Chogokin) as weapons) sizes.

Many of these toys were re-released in the United States. Mattel sold a selection of Chogokin toys under the name Shogun Warriors in the late-1970s. Bandai America sold other Chogokin toys under the Godaikin line in the early-1980s. In the wake of a boy dying after choking on a missile fired from a Battlestar Galactica toy manufactured by Mattel, many of the later Shogun Warriors toys had their spring-loaded missiles modified to launch "child-safe" projectiles, according to safety rules. The Godaikin releases were targeted at an older audience and, as such, were largely identical to the original Japanese releases but at the cost of affordability for the average consumer leading to the downfall of the toyline.

== Modern Chogokin ==
The use of die-cast metal in mass-market robot toys declined greatly after the 1980s, with PVC and ABS plastic becoming the only materials used in most cases. Chogokin toys produced today are usually fairly expensive, high-quality items aimed at collectors.

Bandai's Soul of Chogokin (SOC) line is probably the most famous example of this trend, featuring updated versions of many toys first made by Popy in the 70s and 80s. The first SOC release was an updated Mazinger Z, and many other classic designs followed. The line is still going and has been recently expanded to include more modern robots, some of which did not have a pre-existing Chogokin toy. It is also a way to create new, more easily available mecha toys for older shows such as Dancouga – Super Beast Machine God and Leopardon from Spider-Man.

Debuting in 2000, the Souchaku Henshin series (also known as Armor Trans) is another contemporary Bandai line under the Chogokin banner. These action figures are made to a 5-inch scale, and feature tokusatsu characters from Kamen Rider, Metal Heroes, and GARO. Souchaku Henshin figures feature multiple points of articulation, removable armor, and contain die-cast parts. Much like Soul of Chogokin, Souchaku Henshin features both recent characters as well as updates to classics.

In 2010, Bandai introduced Super Robot Chogokin (SRC), which was an affordable alternative to Soul of Chogokin. The figures measure at approximately 140 mm (14 cm) in height and have less die-cast parts, but boast more articulation and have a wider range of accessory options. The toy line not only featured traditional robots such as Mazinger Z and Brave Reideen, but also robots from The King of Braves GaoGaiGar, Super Robot Taisen: Original Generation and the Super Sentai franchise. As of 2016 the line has been retired.

== Pseudo-gokins ==
Due to success and notoriety in the toy collecting hobby, the term "chogokin" has become somewhat of a representative format for Japanese die cast robot toys. However, as ”超合金”(Chogokin) is a registered trademark of Bandai, other companies have used the "-gokin" suffix, such as Takatoku Toys' Z-Gokin or Max Factory's Max Gokin line.

== See also ==
- Bullmark
- Ark Diecast
