= Machine Robo: Revenge of Cronos =

Japanese anime television series

- Cover to the Western DVD release of the first five episodes

マシンロボ クロノスの大逆襲 (Mashin Robo: Chronos no Dai Gyakushū)
- Genre: Adventure, Mecha
- Anime television series
- Directed by: Hiroshi Yoshida
- Produced by: Hyota Ezu; Minoru Ono; Masaru Umehara
- Written by: Hideki Sonoda
- Music by: Tachio Akano
- Studio: Ashi Productions
- Licensed by: NA: Discotek Media
- Original network: MegaTON (TV Tokyo)
- Original run: July 3, 1986 – May 28, 1987
- Episodes: 47
- Original video animation

Leina: Wolf Sword Legend
- Directed by: Takao Kato; Nobuyoshi Habara; Kiyoshi Murayama
- Produced by: Hiroshi Tazaki; Masaru Umehara; Yukinao Shimoji
- Music by: Chumei Watanabe
- Studio: Ashi Productions
- Licensed by: NA: Discotek Media
- Released: February 5, 1988 – April 26, 1989
- Runtime: 30 minutes
- Episodes: 3
- Original video animation

Lightning Trap - Leina & Laika
- Directed by: Kiyoshi Murayama
- Produced by: Hiroshi Tazaki; Masaru Umehara
- Written by: Hideki Sonoda
- Music by: Osamu Totsuka; Takeshi Ike
- Studio: Ashi Productions
- Licensed by: NA: Discotek Media
- Released: May 23, 1990
- Runtime: 27 minutes
- Light novel

Lightning Trap - Leina & Laika
- Written by: Hideki Sonoda
- Illustrated by: Kia Asamiya; Nobuyoshi Habara
- Published by: Kadokawa Shoten
- Imprint: Sneaker Bunko
- Published: September 1, 1990

Machine Robo: Revenge of Cronos (マシンロボ クロノスの大逆襲, Mashin Robo: Chronos no Dai Gyakushū), known in French-speaking world as La Revanche des GoBots (Revenge of the GoBots), is a Japanese anime television series produced by Ashi Productions. It ran on TV Tokyo from July 3, 1986, through May 28, 1987.

A large portion of the Machine Robo toy line was exported and sold by Tonka in America as GoBots and Rock Lords. Central Park Media released 15 English-subtitled episodes of the series on three DVDs in 2003; these remained the only official English releases until 2022, when Discotek Media released the complete series and its associated OVAs on one SD Blu-ray set.

== Story ==
The story takes place on the mechanical world of Cronos. A band of villains called the Gyandlar have come to the planet in search of the mythical energy known as the Hyribead.

== Characters ==
=== Heroes ===
- Rom Stol (played by Kazuhiko Inoue)

Master of the martial art Tenkū Chūshin Ken (天空宙心拳 literally Sky Space Heart Fist). Using the Wolf Sword Kenrō (剣狼), Rom can combine with Kenryū and Baikanfū for more power. Height: 186 cm, Weight: 880 kg.

Kenryū (Blade Dragon)

Larger robot body of Rom Stol. At the peak of light energy, Kenrō can cross the dimensional barrier and call forth Kenryū. When Rom combines with Kenryū, his power increases by tens. When the combination is complete, he says, "Wherever there is darkness, there is light. Wherever there is evil there is also good! The emissary from the heavens, Kenryū, is here!"

Baikanfu (ViKung-fu)

Largest robot body of Rom Stol and summoned at Rom's command of "Heaven, Earth, Fire and Water, grant me the power!". When Baikanfū synchronizes with the planet's energy, he can draw upon the power of nature itself.

The deluxe Rom Stol/Kenryu/Vaikungfu toy was a remold of DX Bunshin Gattai Tōshi Gordian (aka Godaikin "Guardian").

- Leina Stol (played by Yuko Mizutani)

Younger sister of Rom, she also can use Tenkū Chūshin Ken when necessary. She is very close to Rom and gets jealous when other women get too close to him.

- Blue Jet (played by Shinya Ōtaki)

A swordsman of the Jet Tribe. He can turn into a jet. Fights with "Tenkū Shin Ken (天空真剣, Sky True Sword)" style. Based on the Machine Robo MR-03 Jet Robo toy that was also used as the Renegade Fitor in the GoBots series.

- Rod Drill (played by Kōichi Hashimoto)

Happy-go-lucky member of the Battle tribe. Transforms into a drill-tank. Based on the Machine Robo MR-17 Drill Robo toy that was also used as the former Renegade/current Guardian Screw Head in the GoBots series.

- Triple Jim (played by Toshiharu Sakurai)

Transforms into a helicopter and a car. Acts as a fussy caretaker to Leina.

- Kirai Stol (played by Junichi Kagaya)

Chief of the Cronos tribe and master of Tenkū Chūshin Ken martial art. He taught the art to his children Guardi, Rom, and Leina as well as Blue Jet, Rod Drill, and Bug Newman. He is killed in the first episode after refusing to tell the evil Gyandler about the Hyribead. He bequeaths the sword Kenrō to his son and tells him to fight the evil Gyandler to protect his planet.

- Battle Flex

Rom's sentient jeep. Its toy was recolored as Galoob's "Power Machines" Flex monster truck toy.

- Land Giant 32

32-wheeled transport/repair vehicle. Can separate into three vehicles: Leader 16, GripIron, and TurboJet. An import of Galoob's Power Machines Giant Command 32 vehicle.

- Tough Trailer (played by Hiroshi Yanaka)

Remold of Titan Boy from Choushinsei Flashman with a new trailer.

- Pro Truck Racer (played by Nobuaki Fukuda)

Remold of Titan Boy from Choushinsei Flashman with new accessories.

- Land Commander 5

A power suit that allowed four people to operate.

==== Dash Machine Robo ====
Recolors of Bandai's "Zenmai Kahen Winch Robo" line. Other recolors were released as "Secret Riders" GoBots in the U.S.

- Battle Gyror (Twister)
- Battlancer (Tri-Trak)
- Land Fighter (Tork)

==== Rock People ====
Based on the molds released in the Tonka "Rock Lords" toy line in the U.S. and Europe.

- Battlerock (Boulder) - Design used for many Rock People characters, including variants for elders, females, and children. Made of kimberlite. Carries a Justice Laser Gun.
- Crossrock (Crackpot) - An old prophet and knight Rock Person made of hematite. Carries a Saint Sword.
- Gutsrock (Granite)- Multiple Gutsrocks appeared in the series. Immensely strong and made of Granite.
- Karma - Female Rock Person, seen in episode 32. Similar to Battlerock. No toy exists for her.
- Magnarock (recolor of Slimestone) - A heroic Rock Person made of silver with magnetic force field. Carries a Barrier Amp weapon. First introduced as Maskrock's sidekick.
- Maskrock (Marbles) - A knight and guardian of the Rocks Mountain. Made of cristobalite. Carries an Impulsar weapon.
- Mecharock (Nuggit) - Multiple Mecharocks appeared in the series. Has telescopic vision.
- Rockgilan (Terra-Roc) - A green pterodactyl that served as one of the two legendary beasts in the underground graveyard.
- Rockdon (Spike Stone) - A purple stegosaurus that served as one of the two legendary beasts in the underground graveyard. Noted for looking similar to Baragon from the Godzilla franchise.
- Gattaisaurer (Fossilsaurus) - A large dinosaur-like rock person that assists Rom and Leina during the siege of Emerald City. It can divide into four smaller robots named Header (Jaw Bone), Abarar (Rib Cage), Leggar (Hip Bone), and Taildar (Tail Bone).

==== Jewel People ====
Recolors of these toys were released in the "Rock Lords" toy line in the U.S. and Europe.

- DiaMan (Solitare)
- RubyMan (Flamestone)
- AmberMan (Sunstone)

==== Wheelmen ====
These characters had highly articulated and detailed pull-back toys that are exclusive to Japan. They were not used in the Gobots series.

- Hot Rod Joe
- F-1 Jack
- Power Riser: A mecha similar to the Power Loader from Aliens. Used in the latter episodes by Leina and Rom.

==== Guest Characters ====
- Sophia (played by Kyoko Hamura)

A female Leo Clan warrior. Transforms into a lioness. Reincarnated in the OVAs as Kyoko Yoshida.

- Rury (played by Yūko Kobayashi)

Female martial artist that inherited her late father's dojo. Blue Jet's love interest. Her OVA incarnation is Yuko Sato.

- Min (played by Yoshino Takamori and Yumi Takada)

Daughter of the Hirai Village leader.

- Sara (played by Yoshino Takamori)

A female Scooter Robo. Reincarnated in the OVAs as Sara Yamada.

=== Villains ===
- Gadess (played by Shigezō Sasaoka)

Leader of the Gyandlar.

- Grujios (played by Minoru Inaba)

A giant pink slug that lives encased in a robot body.

- Diondra (played by Hiroko Takahashi)

Female Gyandlar commander.

- Garudi (played by Yōsuke Akimoto [evil], Show Hayami [good])

Gyandlar martial artist. Underneath his giant robot exterior is Rom's long-lost older brother, Guardi Stol, who has been brainwashed. Carries the sword Nagase (流星 Shooting Star).

- Devil Satan 6 (played by Kenichi Ono)

Six monstrous robots that can combine into the giant Devil Satan 6 robot. In the anime they are referred to by number instead of name. Released in new colors as the Renegade combiner Monsterous in the GoBots toy line.

1. Gillhead (Fright Face): (played by Kenichi Ono): The head. Speaks in a Kansai dialect. Weapon: Nunchaku.
2. Barabat (South Claw): Left arm. Weapon: Tonfa.
3. Deathclaw (Weird Wing): Right arm. Weapon is the Sasumata.
4. Gurogiron (Heart Attack): Torso. Weapon is the Wolf Tooth Staff (狼牙棒 Láng-Yá Bàng).
5. Eyegos (Gore Jaw): Right Leg. Weapon is Kusarigama.
6. Blugoda (Fangs): Left Leg. Weapon is Azure Dragon Sword (青龍刀 Qīng-Lóng Dao).

==== Evil Rock People ====
Recolors of these toys were released in the "Rock Lords" toy line in the U.S. and Europe.

- Devil Rock (Magmar)
- Geiger Rock (Tombstone)
- Double Rock (Sticks 'N Stones)
- Amazon Rock (Stoneheart)
- Bloody Rock (Brimstone)

==== Gyandlar Commanders ====
Throughout the first half of the series Gadess uses various natives of Cronos to lead his forces.

- Zagam: Appears in episodes 5, 17, and 18. Powers include a double sided scythe, invisibility, cold resistance, illusions, and dual foot skate blades.
- Mizuchi: Appears in episodes 6, 17, and 18. Powers include body electricity that can causes cave ins, kicking, the Dragon King Sword, shoulder needle missiles, launchable back spikes, and lightning summoning that causes fissures.
- Jingi: Appears in episodes 7, 17, and 18. Powers include dual buffalo horn boomerangs and size growth.
- Gillman: Appears in episode 8. Powers include swimming, hypnosis, three claws in the right wrist, a jawed left arm, an extendable neck with detachable heads, and drills hidden in the arms.
- King Girandor: Appears in episode 9. Powers include a disguise, flight, and burrowing.
- Bug Newman: Appears in episode 10. Renegade Tenkū Chūshin Ken disciple. Mastered the forbidden poison fist "Doku Shutō".
- Iron Sand: Appears in episode 10. Powers include a sand based body, purple lightning strikes from the hands, and turning his hands into hooked swords.
- Brock: Appears in episode 12. Powers include a sword that can emit green lightning, high jumping, and a drill-hammer hybrid weapon in the right arm.
- Glovine: Appears in episode 13. Powers include flight, twin katanas, and self duplication.
- Kina: Appears in episode 14. Daughter of the Gyandlar yakuza bull warrior Jingi. She can combine with her brother Koron to form Jingi Mark 2. Its only known power is dual buffalo horn boomerangs that can emit electricity. Kina was reincarnated in the OVAs as Nami Kojima.
- Gildar Brothers: Appears in episode 15. Powers include forming a tornado, flight, the silver one can extend his arms, the red one is armed with a scythe, the black one can fire a bladed boomerang from his abdomen, the combination to form Giant Gildar.
  - Giant Gildar: Powers include a scythe, abdomen boomerangs, and a constricting whip tail.
- Preacher: Appears in episode 16. Powers include the Anger Fear which spawns illusions based on fear, throwing knives, a gold broadsword that can be encased in fire.
- Black Bass: Appears in episode 19. Powers include summoning flying electric jellyfish and emitting electromagnetic shocks.
- Gelber (Tombstone): Appears in episode 20. Powers include the alpha beam from his atomic death fork and dark illusions.
- Clay (Magmar): Appears in episode 20. Powers include stone skin and the beta beam from his hands. Unlike other Gyandlar commanders he is not truly evil.
- Wiseman/Nerve: Appears in episode 21. Powers include hypnotic sound waves from the mouth, head tentacles, and levitation.
- Magmanian: Appears in episode 23. Powers include a drill-like right arm trident spear and magma manipulation.
- Asura: Appears in episode 38. Powers include paralysis goo bullets from the abdomen and wired claw hands.
- Phenomena: Appears in episode 39 and 41. Powers include levitation and heat bolts from its front spikes.
- Varigale X

A type of spaceship used by the Gyandlar, specifically Garudi. The toy is a remold of Jaguar Vulcan from Taiyo Sentai Sun Vulcan.

== Staff ==
- Narration: Sho Hayami
- Story editor: Hideki Sonoda
- Character designs: Nobuyoshi Habara

== Theme songs ==
- "Machine Robo Honō" by MARTIN (1st opening)
- "Shouri no Machine Robo" by Masato Shimon (2nd opening)
- "Aoi Heart no Stranger" by Ema Watanabe (ending)

== Original video animations ==
=== Leina Stol in Wolf Sword Legend ===
When Revenge of Cronos left off, Rom and Leina had crossed a dimensional barrier. Their physical forms changed from robot to human, and they were separated, with blurred memories. Leina Stol is incarnated as Reina Haruka, a Japanese schoolgirl. As the story progresses, she meets up with Rod Drill, Blue Jet, Triple Jim, and Rom, all of whom are now human. Given the fact the Revenge of Cronos robotic characters appear here in new human forms, the Blue Jet and the Rod Drill appearing with the usual robotic forms in Battle Hackers may be all-different robots.

=== Lightning Trap - Leina & Laika ===
Taking place in the middle of the Wolf Sword Legend feature, this story centers on Leina Haruka, whose plane has been hijacked by a group of thugs led by the supernatural wizard Zarik. At this point, the series has no resemblance whatsoever to the Machine Robo toy line that spawned it.

== Video games ==
Machine Robo was featured in three of Banpresto's Super Robot Wars series, beginning with SRW Compact 2: Part 2 & 3 in 2000 on the Wonderswan. All three parts of SRW Compact 2 were remade in 2002 as SRW Impact on the PlayStation 2. In 2004, the series was included in the PS2's SRW MX's line-up, as well as the PSP port of the same.

== See also ==
- Machine Robo: Battle Hackers
