= God Mars =

Japanese anime television series

- Six God Combination God Mars
- Intertitle from the second opening credits

六神合体ゴッドマーズ (Roku Shin Gattai Goddo Māzu)
- Genre: Mecha, Drama
- Manga

Mars
- Written by: Mitsuteru Yokoyama
- Published by: Akita Shoten
- Magazine: Weekly Shōnen Champion
- Original run: 1976 – 1977
- Volumes: 1
- Anime television series
- Directed by: Tetsuo Imazawa
- Produced by: Tōru Horikoshi; Shigeru Akagawa; Atsushi Shimizu; Yasuji Takahashi
- Written by: Keisuke Fujikawa
- Music by: Kei Wakakusa
- Studio: Tokyo Movie Shinsha
- Licensed by: NA: Discotek Media
- Original network: NNS (Nippon TV)
- Original run: October 2, 1981 – December 24, 1982
- Episodes: 64
Further information
Anime film
God Mars: The Movie
Directed by	Tetsuo Imazawa
Produced by	Shigeru Akagawa
Written by	Keisuke Fujikawa
Music by	Kei Wakakusa
Studio	Tokyo Movie Shinsha
Licensed by	NA: Discotek Media
Released	December 18, 1982
Runtime	97 minutes
Original video animation
God Mars: The Untold Legend
Directed by	Masakatsu Iijima
Produced by	Tadahito Matsumoto
Written by	Keisuke Fujikawa
Music by	Reijirō Koroku
Studio	Tokyo Movie Shinsha
Licensed by	NA: Discotek Media
Released	June 5, 1988
Runtime	55 minutes
Original video animation
Mars
Directed by	Junji Nishimura
Produced by	Takao Asaga
Written by	Masashi Sogo
Music by	Kaoru Wada
Studio	Bee Media
Released	June 10, 1994 – August 8, 1994
Runtime	30 minutes (each)
Episodes	2
Anime television series
Mars the Terminator
Directed by	Yoshitaka Fujimoto
Produced by	Tetsuya Tsuchihashi; Akimoto Okagawa
Written by	Keisuke Fujikawa
Music by	Amazeus
Studio	Plum
Original network	AT-X
Original run	October 31, 2002 – February 6, 2003
Episodes	13

Six God Combination God Mars (六神合体ゴッドマーズ, Roku Shin Gattai Goddo Māzu), commonly known in English as God Mars, is a 1980s mecha anime television series that was popular during its broadcast between 1981 and 1982 in Japan, Hong Kong and Italy. The series consists of 64 episodes and 2 special presentations. Other loosely translated names are "Hexademon Symbiote God Mars", "Six God Union God Mars", and "Six Gods United As One Being".

This television mecha-genre anime is loosely based on the 1976 Mars (マーズ, Māzu) manga from Weekly Shōnen Champion magazine by Mitsuteru Yokoyama. God Mars is named as such to represent the mythological Roman god of war.

== Plot ==
In 1999, humanity begins to advance beyond the known Solar System. The small planet Gishin, led by Emperor Zul, who aims to conquer the galaxy, runs into conflict with Earth which he targets for elimination and to do this, he sends a male baby named Mars to live among humanity. Accompanying the baby is a giant robot named Gaia, which utilizes a new power source strong enough to destroy an entire planet.

As planned, Mars is expected to grow up, where he will activate the bomb within Gaia to fulfill the mission of destroying the Earth. However, when Mars arrives on Earth he is adopted into a Japanese family and renamed Takeru. 17 years later after arrival, Takeru matures with a love for humanity and refuses to detonate the bomb as ordered by his sender, Zul. However, if Takeru was to die, the bomb within Gaia would explode destroying Earth.

Takeru possesses psychic powers (ESP) and also pilots the series' title super robot with mentality. He decides to join the Earth defense forces and becomes a member of the Crasher Squad (an elite space-defense force) where he and the friends he makes in his life on Earth take a last stand against his true home world Gishin's attack. The relationship of Takeru with his brother Marg, which as fate would have it, pits them against each other in the war.

Unknown to the Gishin, five other mecha were created in secrecy alongside and then sent with Gaia by Takeru's father to safeguard his boy. Whenever Earth is in danger, Takeru is able to summon the five other secretly created units (Sphinx, Uranus, Titan, Shin and Ra) to combine with Gaia to assemble the title Six-God Combination God Mars.

=== Cast ===
Name	Kanji/katakana	Romanization	Actor(s)
Mars/Takeru Myojin	マーズ / 明神タケル	Māzu/Myōjin Takeru	Yū Mizushima
Kenji Asuka	飛鳥ケンジ	Asuka Kenji	Hiroya Ishimaru
Naoto Ijuin	伊集院ナオト	Ijūin Naoto	Hirotaka Suzuoki (anime); Gô Shinomiya (Super Robot Wars)
Mika Hyuga	日向ミカ	Hyuga Mika	Youko Kawanami
Akira Kiso	木曽アキラ	Kiso Akira	Yoku Shioya
Namida Akashi	明石ナミダ	Akashi Namida	Eiko Yamada
Shigeru Otsuka	大塚長官	Ōtsuka Shigeru	Kōsei Tomita
Dr. Myojin (Note: This character's first name is unknown, which means he is known only with his family name)	明神博士	Myōjin Hakase	Takeshi Aono
Shizuka Myojin	明神静子	Myōjin Shizuka	Toshiko Maeda
Marg	マーグ	Māgu	Yūji Mitsuya
Rose	ロゼ	Rozu	Rumiko Ukai
Flore	フローレ	Forōre	Yoshiko Sakakibara
Gasshu	ガッシュ	Gasshu	Akio Nojima; Special replacement for episodes 43 to 44: Kazuyuki Sogabe
Emperor Zuul	ズール皇帝	Zūru Kōtei	Gorō Naya
Leader Gyron	ギロン総統	Giron Sōtō	Osamu Kobayashi
Rui	ルイ	Rui	Kumiko Takizawa

== Production ==
Following the previous series The New Adventures of Gigantor (New Tetsujin-28), producers chose to continue adapting works by manga author Mitsuteru Yokoyama. They selected Yokoyama's Mars as the basis for the new series. Because the original manga has a darker tone, the ending and many characters were altered for the anime with Yokoyama's consent; the single major element retained was the premise that the Earth explodes upon the protagonist's death.

Although the original manga features a battle between the protagonist's robot Gaia (Gayer in some versions) and opponents, the anime significantly changed the premise. Key differences include Gaia's combination with five other God Robots to form a six-part combination, a mechanic not present in the source material. Commonalities with the manga are limited to some proper names, the robot names, Mars's motivation, and the fatal consequence tied to Mars's death.

The working title was "Six Gods Combined Mars", referenced to the original work and used in anime magazine announcements. When merchandise began to appear, the name "Mars" was already trademarked, prompting the change to the final title God Mars.

God Mars was produced by much of the same team behind The New Adventures of Gigantor, creating a direct creative lineage between the two mecha series. Director Tetsuo Imazawa and core Tokyo Movie Shinsha staff returned for the project. Keisuke Fujikawa—known for his work on Mazinger Z and Space Battleship Yamato—served as series writer and was instrumental in shaping the story.

Originally planned as a six-month broadcast, strong toy sales and growing popularity—particularly among female viewers as well as the traditional younger toy-buying demographic—led to an extended run of over a year. The narrative was structured into three main arcs: the Gishin Planet arc, the Marmelo Planet arc, and the Earth arc.

Prior anime had shown robot combination sequences (for example UFO Warrior Dai Apolon, Space Emperor God Sigma, Gordian Warrior, and Strongest Robot Daiohja), but those typically featured three-body combinations. God Mars is notable for being the first anime to depict a six-body combination.

The series' production was influenced by its sponsors, who sought to capitalize on the popularity of combining robot designs and their associated merchandise. The titular robot, Godmars, incorporated a transformation and combination concept similar to those featured in Fighter Gordian and Space Emperor God Sigma, both of which had achieved success with their toy lines. However, the elaborate design by Katsushi Murakami, consisting of six individual robots, presented considerable challenges for the hand-drawn animation techniques available at the time. As a result, the robot's action sequences were generally concentrated in the final minutes of each episode, while much of the series focused on its human characters and dramatic storylines.

One of the most significant developments in the series' production was the introduction of Marg, a rival character who did not appear in the original source material. Designed by Hideyuki Motohashi, in his debut as a character designer, and voiced by Yuji Mitsuya, Marg became exceptionally popular among viewers, eventually attracting greater popularity than the protagonist and contributing significantly to the series' female fan base. In a later interview, Motohashi attributed much of the character's popularity to Mitsuya's voice performance rather than his visual design.

Marg's popularity was particularly evident when the series revealed that he would die. The production reportedly received petitions requesting that his life be spared, as well as razor blades sent by distressed fans. Following the character's death, a memorial service was organized at Nippon TV's South Hall in an event inspired by the funeral held for Toru Rikiishi, a character from Ashita no Joe. The event was organized with the cooperation of the anime magazine Animedia.

== Staff ==
- Original author and creator: Mitsuteru Yokoyama
- Series director: Tetsuo Imazawa
- Producer: Atsushi Shimizu, Shigeru Akagawa, Toru Horikoshi, Yasuji Takahashi
- Character design: Hideyuki Motohashi
- Animation director: Hideyuki Motohashi
- Music: Kei Wakakusa
- Mecha design: Hajime Kamegaki
- Background art: Tsutomu Ishigaki
- Narration: Eiji Kanie

== Media ==
=== Film ===
An edited theatrical feature with some new animated scenes was released in 1982 called God Mars: The Movie.

=== Original video animation ===
Later in 1988 (6 years after the television series' final airing in 1982), an OVA was released under the title God Mars: The Legend of the Seventeen Year Old (六神合体ゴッドマーズ 十七歳の伝説) which focused on the life of Marg, Mars' twin brother. Gaia, God Mars, and the Gishin's robot Zeron receive redesigns although the OVA mostly focuses on an alternate telling of Marg's life on Gishin up until the events of the series' 19th television episode.

=== Video games ===
God Mars would go on to make guest appearances in games like entries of the Super Robot Wars series. In Destiny and Z2: Hakai-hen, the player gets a "Game Over" whenever God Mars is destroyed, due to the God Mars storyline for the first 45 episodes with a special game-over screen only in 'Z2: Hakai-hen for when this happens.

== Home media ==
Discotek Media announced its license to the series and its post-television presentations at Otakon 2018 on August 12 and the entire series was released on a SDBD 2-disc set on December 18 – throughout the included discs combined, it contained the series, the movie and the OVA.

== Reception ==
God Mars came out very early in the super robot animation era of the 1980s, having been created by Mitsuteru Yokoyama and did very well in airing. In 1982 it won the Anime Grand Prix.
