= Eagle Comics =

- Industry: Publishing
- Founded: 1983
- Defunct: 1986
- Headquarters: London, United Kingdom
- Key people: Nick Landau
- Products: Comics

Eagle Comics was a short lived comic book publishing company that existed to reprint comic stories from the UK's 2000 A.D. magazine for distribution in North America. They existed from 1983 to 1986 and were based in London, England with product production and distribution located in Canada.

== History ==
The company was formed by Nick Landau to republish stories from the comics anthology 2000 A.D., repackaged into American comic book format (in the same way his Titan Books had been reprinting them as trade paperbacks). In 1986 the license, from IPC, passed to Quality Communications.

== Titles ==
The series they brought to American audiences included:

- Judge Dredd (33 issues – continued, starting with issue 34, by Quality Comics)
- Judge Dredd: The Judge Child Quest (5 issue mini-series)
- Judge Dredd's Crime File (6 issue mini-series)
- Judge Dredd: The Early Cases (6 issue mini-series)
- The Stainless Steel Rat (6 issue mini-series)
- Strontium Dog (4 issue mini-series, although originally advertised as 8 issues)
- Robo-Hunter (5 issue mini-series)
- Nemesis the Warlock (7 issue mini-series)
- 2000 A.D. Monthly (10 issues; title continued by Quality Communications)
