= Machine Robo: Battle Hackers =

Japanese anime television series

マシンロボ ぶっちぎりバトルハッカーズ (Mashin Robo Bucchigiri Batoruhakkāzu)
- Genre: Adventure, Mecha
- Anime television series
- Directed by: Hiroshi Yoshida
- Written by: Hideki Sonoda; Nobuaki Kishima
- Music by: Akano Tachio
- Studio: Ashi Productions
- Licensed by: NA: Discotek Media
- Original network: TXN (TV Tokyo)
- Original run: 1987-06-03 – 1987-12-30
- Episodes: 31

Machine Robo: Battle Hackers (マシンロボ ぶっちぎりバトルハッカーズ, Mashin Robo: Butchigiri Batoruhakkāzu) is a Japanese animated television series produced by Ashi Productions. It ran on TV Tokyo from June 3, 1987, through December 30, 1987.

== Connection to Revenge of Cronos ==
In the finale of Machine Robo: Revenge of Cronos, the Machine Robo decide to leave planet Cronos after defeating Gandler so that they can fight against evil in a new dimension. When they cross the dimensional barrier, the Machine Robo appear on Electronic Planet B1 with no memory of events from the previous series.

== Story ==
In the year 406AE, the Electronic Planet B-1 falls prey to the Mechanoid space gang Gurendos. To fight back against them, the Machine Robo join forces to form the Algo Republic. Meanwhile, a large starship with five humans in suspended animation malfunctions and crash lands on B-1. Emerging from their ship, they find themselves caught up in the struggle between the Gurendos forces and the Algo Republic, eventually joining forces with the rough-and-tumble bunch of Machine Robo known as the Battle Hackers team to help save B-1 and eventually find a way back to Earth. In the final episode it is discovered that the robotic wars of Electronic Planet B1 were created by humans as a testing ground for arms traders.

== Characters ==
=== Algo Army ===
- RIM (voice: Masako Katsuki)

The Mother Computer that commands the Algo Army.

==== Battle Hackers ====
The most dangerous unit in the Algo Army, it is composed of the misfits, hotheads, and dropouts of the Machine Robo.

- R. JeTan (voice: Shin'ya Ōtaki)

The leader of the Battle Hackers. Like his name suggests, he transforms from robot to jet to tank. Carries the "R. Bazooka" and sub-rifle.

- Garzack (voice: Nobuyuki Furuta)

Non-transforming sub-commander, his weapon is the "Garfire Special". Although no toy of Garzack was ever released, an electronic prototype was designed that would have interacted with the anime.

- Mach Blaster (voice: Issei Futamata)

A triple changer that can go from robot to jet to gun. Former White Thunder member.

- Drill Crusher (voice: Kōichi Yamadera)

"Muscle"-type character. Can transform from robot to drill-tank to rhinoceros. Former Silver Wolves member.

- Fossil People

Header, Abarar, Leggar and Taildar combine into Gattai Saurer. Get around on hoverboards.

- Pro Truck Racer (voice: Nobuaki Fukuda)

Former Silver Wolves member. Carries the Big Blazer Cannon.

===== Wheelmen =====
- Hot Rod Joe
- F-1 Jack
- Buggy Wolf
- Drag Sam
- Rotary Kid
- Twincam Jimmy

===== Humans =====
- Akira Amachi (voice: Masaaki Ōkura)

Pilots the Jet Riser

- Luke Stewart (voice: Ken'yū Horiuchi)

Pilots the Battle Riser

- Mia White (voice: Naoko Matsui)

Pilots the Power Riser

- Zen Ogawa (voice: Nozomu Sasaki)
- Patricia Longfellow (voice: Yuri Amano)

==== Winner Robo ====
- Roboshooter Gaiden
- Testarossa Winner

Ferrari Testarossa.

- Truck Winner

Race truck

- Police Winner

Toyota Soarer Patrol Car

- Buggy Winner

Hornet Buggy. Called Dirt Robo in the anime.

- F-1 Winner

Lotus F1. Called Racer Robo in the anime.

- Eagle Winner

F-15 Eagle.

- Fire Winner

Chemical Fire Engine

- Porsche Winner

Porsche 935.

==== Silver Wolves ====
The new team name of the Battle Clan from Revenge of Cronos. Composed of the land and sea robots.

- Rod Drill (played by Ken'yū Horiuchi)

Leader of the Silver Wolves. Transforms into a drill-tank. One of his toy molds was used as the Renegade Screw Head in the GoBots series.

==== White Thunder ====
Team name of the Jet Clan from Revenge of Cronos. Composed of the aerial robots.

- Blue Jet (played by Shinya Ōtaki)

Leader of the White Thunder. He can turn into a jet. Fights with "Tenkū Shin Ken (天空真剣, Sky True Sword)" style sword. One of his toy molds was used as the Renegade Fitor in the GoBots series.

==== Blue Dragons ====
Team name of the Jewel Lords and Rock Lords from Revenge of Cronos.

- Dia Man (Solitare) (played by Shō Hayami)

Leader of the Blue Dragons. Transforms into a diamond.

==== Red Knights ====
Team name of the Martial Arts Robo/Cronos Clan from Revenge of Cronos.

- Kendo Robo

Leader of the Red Knights.

=== Gurendos ===
The villains of the series. The group's name derives from the term guren-tai (愚連隊 hoodlums)

- Dylan (ディラン総統) (voice: Ryūzaburō Ōtomo, Junichi Kagaya)

An evil computer that controls the Gurendos.

- Gakurandar (ガクランダー) (voice: Ken Yamaguchi)

Second-in-command of the Gurendos. His name is based on gakuran.

- Kariagen (カリアゲン) (voice: Satoru Inagaki)

Kariage (刈り上げ) loosely translates to "hair cropped close in the back".

- Sorikondar (ソリコンダー) (voice: Minoru Inaba)

Name derived from sorikomi (剃り込み), again referring to his hairstyle.

- Yasand (ヤーサンド) (voice: Yūji Mikimoto)

A yakuza swordsman. Rides a Mercedes-Benz. Name derived from Yassan (ヤッサン).

- Shibumidas (シブミダス) (voice: Ken'ichi Ono)

Named derived from shibumi.

- Rikimines (リキミネス) (voice: Minoru Inaba)
- Suji (スジ) (voice: Issei Futamata)

Sorikondar's aide. Speaks in a Kansai dialect. Named after the phrase Suji no toranai (筋の通らない illogical)

- Iron Eagle (アイアンイーグル) (voice: Katsumi Suzuki)
- Pattsuri (パッツリ)
- Zentry (ゼントリー)
- Kizūn (キズーン)

Named derived from kizu (scar).

- Gantsuke (ガンツケ)
- Shinobis (シノビス)

Named derived from shinobi (ninja).

- Igarn (イガーン)

Named derived from Iga, an ancient ninja province.

- Geruka (ゲルカ)
- Teppodaman (テッポダマン)
- Uwappā (ウワッパー)
- Sitappā (シタッパー)

Shitappa means "underling".

- Bi-Bi-Bi Black (ビビビブラック)
- Devil Satan 6 (played by Kenichi Ono)

Six monstrous robots that can combine into the giant Devil Satan 6 robot. In the anime they are referred to by number instead of name.

1. Gillhead (played by Kenichi Ono): The head. Speaks in a Kansai dialect.
2. Barabat: Left arm.
3. Deathclaw: Right arm.
4. Gurogiron: Torso.
5. Eyegos: Right Leg.
6. Blugoda: Left Leg.

== See also ==
- Machine Robo
- Machine Robo: Revenge of Cronos
