= Machine Robo Mugenbine =

Japanese toy line

The current logo of the Machine Robo Mugenbine toyline.

Machine Robo Mugenbine (マシンロボムゲンバイン), also called Multiple General Node Combine System or Mu.Gen.Bine is a Japanese transforming robot toyline first released on 27 December 2003 by Bandai. Designed by PLEX, Mugenbine is the successor of the Machine Robo line of transforming toy robots.

== About Mugenbine ==
Mugenbine is a term derived from the words mugen, which is Japanese for 'infinite', and the English word 'combine', which is the theme for the series. Mugenbine uses numerous interlocking pegs and sockets to attach and remove components and relocate them in order to form different modes. While all robotic figures have at least two official alternate modes and most have official combinations with one to three other robot figures, the concept of the line is to allow you to assemble your own animal and machine creations.

=== Core figures ===
The majority of the series consists of robot figures called Mugenroids, basic block-proportioned figures that can contort and fold into various shapes, most notably a cube, to form the core of its various modes. While they generally look identical aside from color scheme, each Mugenroid has a different head sculpt. Most sets come with six to ten components called 'bine parts' that attach via the many pegs and holes on the Mugenroid, as well as on each other, to create other forms. At first, each figure featured an animal and vehicle mode only, but later sets expanded to include larger robot modes as well, and some even later sets did away with the vehicle mode. As the toyline expanded, new cores were created. Most notable is the Turboroid, which can't bend as many ways as its predecessor, but already has wheels attached to help form vehicle modes and included completely unique heads that could rotate. Others used no core figure at all, instead coming with a Mugen Engine that allows spinning gimmicks. Later figures use new core bots called Buildroids that are formed from parts themselves and feature small pilot figures called Roiders.

== Toy List ==
=== Mugenbine Alphabet Gattai Robot series (ムゲン合体シリーズ) ===
The basic series of toys are referred to as "Mugen Gattai" (fusion) figures. The initial release of these figures came alphabetically, as well as having most Mugenroids (ムゲンロイド) feature a matching letter on the side of their head. This initial series is often called the "Letter" or "Alphabet" series for these reasons. The toyline is known for running themes for its figures. The toys Teiouryu, Uzumakidori, Wanrikiguma, and Yuutenma were called Ridebines (ライドバイン), as their vehicle modes don't require the Mugenroid to form its core, rather the parts formed a vehicle for the Mugenroid to ride on. The figures Quest Knight, Save Gunman, and Razor Ninja were referred to in commercials as the Three Musketeers and are designed after historical warrior types, a knight, a cowboy, and a ninja respectively. The various dinosaur figures, likewise, were considered their own subgroup. The series also introduced larger, deluxe figures. These included Victory Leon, an upgrade of Air Leon, and Zord Elephant.

| English name | Japanese name | Animal | Machine | Robot? | Combiner | Type | Color | Class by alphabet | Class by number |
| Air Leon | エアレオン | Lion | Jet | No | Mugen General 3 (ムゲンジェネラル 3), Mugen General 5 (ムゲンジェネラル 5), Mugen General 7 (ムゲンジェネラル 7) | Mugenroid | Red & White | A | 01 |
| Build Giraffet | ビルジュラフト | Giraffe | Crane | No | Mugen General 3, Mugen General 5, Mugen General 7 | Mugenroid | Yellow & White | B | 02 |
| Carry Eagle | キャリーイーグル | Eagle | Pickup Truck | No | Mugen General 3, Mugen General 5, Mugen General 7 | Mugenroid | Blue & White | C | 03 |
| Dig Kong | ディグコング | Gorilla | Excavator | No | Mugen Kaiser 4 (ムゲンカイザー 4), Mugen General 5, Mugen General 7 | Mugenroid | Green & White | D | 04 |
| Evo Rhinoce | エヴォライノス | Rhino | Tunnel Driller | No | Mugen Kaiser 4, Mugen General 5, Mugen General 7 | Mugenroid | Orange & White | E | 05 |
| Fang Tiger^{1} | ファングタイガー | Tiger | Jet | No | Mugen Kaiser 4, Mugen General 7 | Mugenroid | Cyan & White | F | 07 |
| Galaxy Rex | ギャラクシーレックス | Tyrannosaurus | Shuttle w/ Rockets | No | Mugen Dino Double (ムゲンダイナーダブル), Mugen Express Double^{2} (ムゲンエクスプレスダブル) | Mugenroid | White & Scarlet | G | 08 |
| Heat Tricera | ヒートトリケラ | Triceratops | Locomotive | No | Mugen Dino Double, Mugen Express Double | Mugenroid | White & Persian blue | H | 09 |
| Iron Beetle | アイアンビートル | Rhino beetle | VTOL | No | Mugen Sector Double (ムゲンゼクターダブル), Mugen Mantis Double (ムゲンマンティスダブル) | Mugenroid | Black & Lava | I | 10 |
| Junk Stagg | ジャンクスタッグ | Stag beetle | Bulldozer | No | Mugen Sector Double, Mugen Mantis Double | Mugenroid | Black & Royal blue | J | 11 |
| Kaiser Condor^{1} | カイザーコンドル | Condor | Dump Truck | No | Mugen Kaiser 4 | Mugenroid | Bright green & White | K | 12 |
| Launcher Saurus | ランチャーザウルス | Allosaurus | Space Shuttle | No | Mugen Launcher Saurus (w/Mugen Fire and Mugen Police) | Mugenroid | Black & White | L | None |
| Mach Ptera | マッハプテラ | Pterodactyl | Race Car | No | None | Mugenroid | White & Blue | M | None |
| Needle Stego | ニードルステゴ | Stegosaurus | Helicopter | No | None | Mugenroid | White & Orange | N | None |
| Overligan^{3} | オーバーライガン | Liger | Drill Vehicle | No | None | Turboroid | Gold | O | None |
| Power Nose^{3} | パワーノーズ | Elephant | Crane | No | None | Turboroid | Maya blue | P | None |
| Quest Knight^{3} | クエストナイト | Dragon | Fire truck w/ Gateway | Yes | Mugen Jyushi 3 (ムゲンジュウシ 3) | Turboroid | Maroon | Q | None |
| Razor Ninja^{3} | レイザーニンジャ | Sawfish | Car w/ Stoplight | Yes | Mugen Jyushi 3 | Turboroid | Blue | R | None |
| Save Gunman^{3} | セイブガンマン | Bull | Truck w/ Gas Pump | Yes | Mugen Jyushi 3 | Turboroid | Green | S | None |
| Teiouryu | テイオウリュウ | Dragon | Motorcycle | Yes | Mugen Ride General 3 (ライドジェネラル 3) | Mugenroid | White | T | None |
| Uzumakidori | ウズマキドリ | Eagle | Jetski | Yes | Mugen Ride General 3 | Mugenroid | Blue | U | None |
| Victory Leon | ビクトリーレオン | Winged lion | Truck w/ Base | Yes | None | Mugenroid | Red & Blue | V | None |
| Wanrikiguma | ワンリキグマ | Bear | GoKart | Yes | Mugen Ride General 3 | Mugenroid | Yellow | W | None |
| Xenonbine | ゼノンバイン | Dragon/scorpion | Jet/Tank | Yes | None | Mugenroid | Violet | X | 06 |
| Yuutenma^{4} | ユウテンマ | Pegasus | Hang Glider | Yes | ^{4} | Mugenroid | White & Yellow | Y | None |
| Zord Elephant^{5} | ゾードエレファント | Elephant | Flatbed Truck | Yes | Mugen General 7^{5} | Mugenroid | Grey & Red & Yellow | Z | None |

^{1} Fang Tiger and Kaiser Condor were reengineered from Air Leon and Carry Eagle respectively.
^{2} Galaxy Rex and Heat Tricera also combine in animal mode as Mugen Brachio Double (ムゲンブラキオダブル).
^{3} These figures are Turboroids and thus do not feature their assigned letter on their head sculpts.
^{4} Yuutenma combines into extra parts for all three of Teiouryu's modes
^{5} Mugen General 7's figures can also combine into a super animal mode.

Some of the more popular figures were released a second time in new color schemes and usually with new weapon parts. Figures that officially combine were repacked like this as well.

| Name | Originally | Changes |
| Air Leon (II) | Air Leon | Repainted into black and gold. |
| (Proto) Air Leon | Air Leon | Repainted into white and red. Packed with Build Giraffe and Carry Eagle repaints^{1} |
| (Proto) Build Giraffe | Build Giraffe | Repainted into red and white. Packed with Air Leon and Carry Eagle repaints^{1} |
| (Proto) Carry Eagle | Carry Eagle | Repainted into red and white. Packed with Build Giraffe and Air Leon repaints^{1} |
| Assault (Air) Leon | Air Leon | Repainted in blue and black. Two new gun bine parts included. |
| Energy (Evo) Rhinoce | Evo Rhinoce | Repainted in dark grey and black. Two new cannon bine parts included. |
| Great (Galaxy) Rex | Galaxy Rex | Repainted in red and white. Two new sword bine parts included. |
| Lead (Launcher) Saurus | Launcher Saurus | Repainted in blue and black. Two new gun bine parts included. ^{2} |
| Inter (Iron) Beetle | Iron Beetle | Repainted in maroon and gold. Packed with Jab Stag.^{3} |
| Jab (Junk) Stagg | Junk Stagg | Repainted in black and silver with a new head part. Packed with Inter Beetle.^{3} |
| (Armed) Quest Knight | Quest Knight | Repainted in white and blue. Packed with Razor Ninja and Save Gunman repaints.^{4} |
| (Armed) Razor Ninja | Razor Ninja | Repainted in black. Packed with Quest Knight and Save Gunman repaints.^{4} |
| (Armed) Save Gunman | Save Gunman | Repainted in red. Packed with Quest Knight and Razor Ninja repaints.^{4} |

^{1} This set was also packed with Protoroid, a translucent green Mugenroid.
^{2} The additional parts allowed Lead Saurus an official robot mode.
^{3} This pack included five insect-based bine parts to form weapons and upgrades in the toy's various modes
^{4} This pack included three weapon parts that combined into a lion called Armed Leon

The Mugen Gattai series continued as more variations of Mugenbine were released, though the figures became simpler, and did away with machine modes. Instead of English letters, these figures were themed after katakana instead. They generally included official combinations with the larger Mugen Engine figures released at the time.

| English name | Japanese name | Animal | Combines with | Color | Katakana |
| Impact Dile | インパクトダイル | Crocodile | Arch Tiger | Green & White | イ |
| Wing Bat | ウイングバット | Bat | Arch Tiger | Blue & White | ウ |
| Gear Tortoise | ギアトータス | Tortoise | Guard Kong | Red & Maroon & White | ギ |
| Spit Cobra^{1} | スピットコブラ | Cobra | Arch Tiger or Saga Falcon | Black & Orange & White | ス |

^{1} Spit Cobra is the only Mugenbine figure to include spring-launched missiles.

Another set was released that included three new Mugenroids recolored in translucent plastic. Spark Roid, Quick Roid, and Rush Roid came with only a few bine parts that acted as weaponry, or provided torso and head attachments to combine into Roid General 3.

=== Mugenbine Gattai Base Robot series (ムゲンベースシリーズ) ===
Part of the Mugen Gattai series, these deluxe sized sets were released with Turboroids (ターボロイド) and along with animal, machine, and robot modes, also formed bases for the smaller Turoboid machines to use. Their bine parts also combine to form larger, big machine modes that the smaller machines can ride in. They're known for their large box components that form the bulk of their modes. Part of their design is to allow fans who want to build gigantic robots from their sets to accomplish them easier, as such all base figures come with an extra head for this purpose.

| English name | Japanese name | Machine | Big machine | Animal | Base | Type | Color | Number |
| Mugen Police^{1} | ムゲンポリス | Police Car | Locomotive | Tyrannosaurus | Police Station | Turboroid | Blue | 01 |
| Mugen Fire^{1} | ムゲンファイヤー | Fire Truck | Semi Truck | Brachiosaurus | Fire House | Turboroid | Red | 02 |
| Mugen Builder^{1} | ムゲンビルダー | Dump Truck | Airship | Mammoth | Excavator | Turboroid | Orange | 03 |
| Mugen Hercules | ムゲンヘラクレス | Bullet Train | Horse & Carriage | Hercules beetle | Station | Mugenroid w/ Turboroid | Black & Grey | 04 |

^{1} Mugen Police, Mugen Fire, and Mugen Builder combine into Mugen Commander 3 (ムゲンコマンダー 3)

=== Mugenbine Gattai Engine Robot series (ムゲンエンジンシリーズ) ===
Some figures released did away with the core robot completely. Instead, the toy's various forms were built around a Mugen Engine, also called a Tornado Engine. These engines use a series of gears and wheels to allow parts connected to it to spin when triggered, allowing some combinations with other Mugenbine toys as spinning weapons. While all figures have robot modes, some do not have machine modes. As with the later Mugen Gattai series, these sets have a katakana theme.

| English name | Japanese name | Animal | Machine | Combines with | Color | Katakana |
| Arch Tiger | アークタイガー | White tiger | Super Police Car | Impact Dile or Wing Bat | White | ア |
| Guard Kong | ガードコング | Gorilla | None | Arch Tiger and Impact Dile, or Gear Tortoise | Black & Red | ガ |
| Saga Falcon^{1} | サーガファルコン | Falcon | None | Arch Tiger or Spit Cobra | Red (Saga Falcon) & Blue (Sig Sphinx) | サ (Saga Falcon) & シ (Sig Sphinx) |
| Turbo Animal Force | ターボアニマルフォース | Two Lions (Blue & Red), an Elephant, and a Hawk^{2} | VTOL Helicopter | Arch Tiger | Black & Red & Blue & Violet | タ, チ, ツ, テ, ト (Turbo Animal Force, and each of its animal components, respectively) |

^{1} Saga Falcon included a lion-based robot named Sig Sphinx (シグスフィンクス) which combined with it for its robot mode.
^{2} Named Chienojishi (チエノジシ), Tsuwamonojishi (ツワモノジシ), Tekkenzou (テッケンゾウ), and Toukondaka (トウコンダカ), respectively.

=== Mugenbine Build Gattai Robot series (ビルド合体シリーズ) ===
Returning to the concept of a core robot, the Build Gattai are the newest form of normal Mugenbine figures. Rather than a one piece Mugenroid or Turboroid, a new figure called a Buildroid (ビルドロイド) is used. These are made up of bine parts themselves and feature a cockpit for a mini figure, called a Roider, to sit inside. Buildroids are a good bit bigger than Mugenroids, meaning these sets usually had a lot more bine parts, and also return to the formula of including machine, animal, and robot modes.

| English name | Japanese name | Animal | Machine | Combines with |
| Powerful Tyranno | パワフルティラノ | Tyrannosaurus | Power Shovel | Speed Eagle |
| Speed Eagle | スピードイーグル | Eagle | Indy Car | Powerful Tyranno |
| Heavy Mammoth | ヘビーマンモス | Mammoth | Airship/Bulldozer | Powerful Tyranno & Speed Eagle |
| Chase Dober | チェイスドーベル | Doberman^{1} | Riot Truck | Attack Condor (Police Body Double) |
| Attack Condor | アタックコンドル | Condor | Helicopter & Motorcycle | Chase Dober (Police Body Double) |
| Tri Wolf | トライウルフ | Wolf | Fire Truck | Powerful Tyranno, Speed Eagle, Heavy Mammoth |
| Dark Flame Dragon^{2} | ダークフレイムドラゴン | Dragon | Aerial Gunship | None |

^{1} The Doberman form is accomplished without using the Buildroid, who is police themed.
^{2} Dark Flame Dragon includes two Roider pilots and includes 16 official modes including its main animal, machine, and robot modes.

=== Candy Robot Toy series ===
While no recent Gattai series toys have been released, Mugenbine survives as a series of candy toys. These are released similar to how baseball cards are sold in America, at convenience stores on the checkout counter and at specialty shops, and packed with them is a piece of candy, similar to large Smarties (Ce De Candy). They tend to be much more simple, with little paint, relying heavily on stickers for its detailing, and with parts that usually come still attached to their plastic trees like model kits. The line was revived in 2017 under the name Mugen Saga, featuring enhanced detailing on some parts.
Series one
This series reused popular original Mugenbine figures, though heavily simplified, Air Leon's lion head no longer tucked away in jet mode for example. A new combined robot mode for the three was also devised.

| Name | Animal | Machine |
| Air Leon | Lion | Jet |
| Galaxy Rex | Tyrannosaurus | Shuttle w/ Rockets |
| Carry Eagle | Eagle | Pickup Truck |

Series two - Mugen Four Holy Beasts (ムゲン四聖獣)
Beginning with this series, candy toys became whole new sculpts and were released in groups of five, with one piece being a simplified Mugenroid, lacking ratcheted joints and movable pegs. The remaining four are beast based and form weapon modes for larger Mugenbine figures. For this initial set, the animals are based on the four saint beasts of Japanese lore. The five figures combine into Mugen Emperor (ムゲンエンペラー)

| English name | Japanese name | Animal | Weapon | Combination |
| Beast Mugenroid | ビーストムゲンロイド | None | Twin Dagger | Mugen Emperor |
| Mugen Byakko | ムゲンビャッコ | Tiger | Clawed Lance | Mugen Emperor |
| Mugen Suzaku | ムゲンスザク | Phoenix | Shield | Mugen Emperor |
| Mugen Seiryu | ムゲンセイリュウ | Dragon | Twin Lance | Mugen Emperor |
| Mugen Genbu | ムゲンゲンブ | Turtle | War Hammer | Mugen Emperor |

Because of the popularity of this set, it was released again, this time beside dark repaints of themselves. These figures used a new theme on names, replacing Mugen with Death while retaining their previous names, and likewise, combined into Death Emperor, only the second official villain in the Mugenbine franchise after Xenonbine.

Series three - Mugen Four Dragons (ムゲン四龍伝)
The second new series followed the same theme as the first, this time the Mugenroid was released along with four different dragons, each with a different theme and weapon mode. Combined, they became Mugen Ryuuou (ムゲンリュウオウ, Dragon King), who was notably larger and better articulated than its predecessor.

| English name | Japanese name | Animal | Weapon | Combination |
| Dragon Mugenroid | ドラゴンムゲンロイド | None | Fire Sword | Mugen Ryuuou |
| Mugen Enryuu | ムゲンエンリュウ | Fire Dragon | Lance | Mugen Ryuuou |
| Mugen Suiryuu | ムゲンスイリュウ | Water Dragon | Spin Blade | Mugen Ryuuou |
| Mugen Chiryuu | ムゲンチリュウ | Land Dragon | Shuriken | Mugen Ryuuou |
| Mugen Rairyuu | ムゲンライリュウ | Thunder Dragon | Bow | Mugen Ryuuou |

Series four - Mugen Golden God (ムゲン金王神) and Mugen Silver God (ムゲン銀王者)
Created by repainting all the figures from the Four Holy Beast and Four Dragons sets, these sets were boxed together, typically coming one of each per box. Rather than retaining the original combinations with new colors, the designers rearranged the figures and designed completely new robot modes, along with sculpting new heads for the robot modes. This series also included a small storyline featuring their battle with Dark Flame Dragon as well as their similarities.

| English name | Japanese name | Originally | Combine |
| Mugenroid Kin-Ou | ムゲンロイドキンオウ | Beast Mugenroid | Kinoujin |
| Mugen Ganryuu | ムゲンガンリュウ | Mugen Chiryu | Kinoujin |
| Mugen Kagutora | ムゲンカゲトラ | Mugen Byakko | Kinoujin |
| Mugen Houou | ムゲンホウオウ | Mugen Suzaku | Kinoujin |
| Mugen Kaenryuu | ムゲンカエンリュウ | Mugen Enryu | Kinoujin |
| Mugenroid Gin-Ou | ムゲンロイドギンオウ | Dragon Mugenroid | Ginouja |
| Mugen Reiki | ムゲンレイキ | Mugen Genbu | Ginouja |
| Mugen Chidori | ムゲンチドリ | Mugen Rairyu | Ginouja |
| Mugen Kouryuu | ムゲンコウリュウ | Mugen Seiryu | Ginouja |
| Mugen Mizuchi | ムゲンミズチ | Mugen Suiryu | Ginouja |

Series five - Mugen Five God Beasts (ムゲン五神獣)
This series of figures removes the Mugenroid from the design and replaces it with a Buildroid complete with Roider figure. The theme of the set is Egyptian mythology, featuring designs based on many Egyptian gods, and combine into Mugen Pharaoh (ムゲンファラオ). According to Tokyo Toy Show 2009, the set is reissued and set to be released again in November.

| English name | Japanese name | Based on | Combination |
| Mugen Anubis | ムゲンアヌビス | Anubis, God of Death | Mugen Pharaoh |
| Mugen Sphinx | ムゲンスフィンクス | Sphinx, Guardian Beast | Mugen Pharaoh |
| Mugen Ra | ムゲンラー | Ra, God of the Sun | Mugen Pharaoh |
| Mugen Scorpion | ムゲンスコーピオン | Serket, Goddess of Magic | Mugen Pharaoh |
| Mugen Sobek | ムゲンセベク | Sobek, Guardian of the Gods | Mugen Pharaoh |

Series six - Mugen Holy Beasts of the Sword (ムゲン剣聖獣)
Released in June, the set focuses on mythical and horned animals, most of which from European legend. It also retains the Buildroid construction as its core robot is more complex than a Mugenroid. They combine into a robot called Mugen Arthur (ムゲンアーサー), a reference to King Arthur.

| Name | Japanese name | Animal | Combination |
| Mugen Knight | ムゲンナイト | Knight | Mugen Arthur |
| Mugen Lio | ムゲンライオ | Lion | Mugen Arthur |
| Mugen Phoenix | ムゲンフェニックス | Phoenix | Mugen Arthur |
| Mugen Unicorn | ムゲンユニコーン | Unicorn | Mugen Arthur |
| Mugen Leviathan | ムゲンリヴァイアサン | Serpent Dragon | Mugen Arthur |

Series seven - Mugen Holy Beasts of the Sea (ムゲン海聖獣)
The next series of candy toys featured a new theme of sea beasts. The new set is composed of a brand new mold based on sea animals, which combine to form Mugen Pirates. Mugen Leviathan from the previous set can also be added on to create Mugen Kaioh (ムゲンパイレーツ), though it is possible to create an alternative version of this second figure using only the parts from this set, along with a combined pirate ship mode.

| Name | Japanese name | Animal | Combination |
| Mugen Captain | ムゲンキャプテン | Pirate | Mugen Pirate/Mugen Kaioh (/w Mugen Leviathan Added) |
| Mugen Stingray | ムゲンスティングレー | Stingray | Mugen Pirate/Mugen Kaioh (/w Mugen Leviathan Added) |
| Mugen Whale | ムゲンホエール | Whale | Mugen Pirate/Mugen Kaioh (/w Mugen Leviathan Added) |
| Mugen Scissors | ムゲンシザー | Crab | Mugen Pirate/Mugen Kaioh (/w Mugen Leviathan Added) |
| Mugen Kraken | ムゲンクラーケン | Giant squid/kraken | Mugen Pirate/Mugen Kaioh (/w Mugen Leviathan Added) |
| Mugen Shark | ムゲンシャーク | Sawshark/hammerhead shark | Mugen Pirate/Mugen Kaioh (/w Mugen Leviathan Added) |

Series eight & nine - Mugen Fighting God Beasts (ムゲン闘神獣)
The next two series of candy toys were released the same month. The sets featured an Indian theme. Each set could be combined to form a larger robot and all twelve figures could be combined to form Mugen Enou (ムゲンエンオウ, Fire Emperor).

| English name | Japanese name | Animal | Combination |
| Mugen Hanumad | ムゲンハヌマード | Hanuman | Mugen Ashura (ムゲンアシュラ)/Mugen Enou |
| Mugen Ganeshan | ムゲンガネーシャン | Ganesha | Mugen Ashura/Mugen Enou |
| Mugen Baion | ムゲンバイオン | Barong | Mugen Ashura/Mugen Enou |
| Mugen Umbra | ムゲンアンブラ | Nagaraja | Mugen Ashura/Mugen Enou |
| Mugen Zebu | ムゲンゼブー | Zebu | Mugen Ashura/Mugen Enou |
| Mugen Garuda | ムゲンガルーダ | Garuda | Mugen Ashura/Mugen Enou |
| Monkeybine | モンキーバイン | Monkey | Mugen Ryufire (リュウファイヤーバイン)/Mugen Enou |
| Elephanbine | エレファンバイン | Elephant | Mugen Ryufire/Mugen Enou |
| Leobine | レオバイン | Lion | Mugen Ryufire/Mugen Enou |
| Cobrabine | コブラバイン | Cobra | Mugen Ryufire/Mugen Enou |
| Wingbine | ウイングバイン | Eagle | Mugen Ryufire/Mugen Enou |
| Hornbine | ホーンバイン | Zebu | Mugen Ryufire/Mugen Enou |

Series ten and eleven - Mugen Phantom Saint Beast (ムゲン幻聖獣)
The Tenth and Eleventh series of the Mugenbine Candy Toys features an all European Mystic theme. Series 10 was released on 15 June 2009 while 11 was released in July 2009 and featured twelve Beasts, with the first six combining to form Mugen Guardian (ムゲンガーディアン), while the others combine into Mugen Ryustorm (リュウストームバイン). Both sets can also combine to form Mugen Shinou (ムゲンシンオウ).

| English name | Japanese name | Animal | Combination |
| Mugen Elf | ムゲンエルフ | Elf | Mugen Guardian/Mugen Shinou |
| Mugen Goblin | ムゲンゴブリン | Goblin | Mugen Guardian/Mugen Shinou |
| Mugen Stag | ムゲンドルクス | Stag beetle | Mugen Guardian/Mugen Shinou |
| Mugen Hornet | ムゲンホーネット | Hornet | Mugen Guardian/Mugen Shinou |
| Mugen Spider | ムゲンスパイダー | Spider | Mugen Guardian/Mugen Shinou |
| Mugen Mantis | ムゲンウォーサイズ | Mantis | Mugen Guardian/Mugen Shinou |
| Littlebine | リトルバイン | Elf | Mugen Ryustorm/Mugen Shinou |
| Dwarfbine | ドワーフバイン | Dwarf | Mugen Ryustorm/Mugen Shinou |
| Stagbine | スタッグバイン | Stag beetle | Mugen Ryustorm/Mugen Shinou |
| Beebine | ビーバイン | Bee | Mugen Ryustorm/Mugen Shinou |
| Capturebine | キャプチャバイン | Spider | Mugen Ryustorm/Mugen Shinou |
| Mantisbine | マンティスバイン | Mantis | Mugen Ryustorm/Mugen Shinou |

Series twelve - G Mugenbine Series: Mugen G Gentoshi (ムゲンバインG幻闘士)
The Twelfth of the Mugenbine Candy Toys features a direct sequel to the Phantom Saint Beast line. Released in August 2009, the series was sold in Gashaphon Eggs and it features five figures which combine into either Mugen G-Phantom (ムゲンジーファントム) or Mugen Blade (ムゲンブレード), which can be used by Mugen Shinou. This also marks the start of the new Mugenbine lineup named "G Mugenbine Series".

| Name | Japanese name | Combination |
| Mugen G Elf | ムゲンジーエルフ | Mugen G-Phantom/Mugen Blade |
| Mugen G Stag | ムゲンジースタッグ | Mugen G-Phantom/Mugen Blade |
| Mugen G Bee | ムゲンジービー | Mugen G-Phantom/Mugen Blade |
| Mugen G Spider | ムゲンジースパイダー | Mugen G-Phantom/Mugen Blade |
| Mugen G Mantis | ムゲンジーマンティス | Mugen G-Phantom/Mugen Blade |

Series thirteen and fourteen - Mugen Fierce God Beast (ムゲン猛神獣)
The Thirteenth of the Mugenbine Candy Toys series was announced at the Tokyo Toy Show 2009 and was released in September 2009. The series features an African Safari Theme and it's composed of seven units (Counting RyuuDash), which can combine into Mugen Safari (ムゲンサファリ). The set can also combine with the Garyuuki set, which is planned to be released later in October 2009. The second set is composed of six units which can combine into Mugen Ryuuborn (リュウボーンバインズ), which has both Dragon and Fighter modes. Both sets can combine further to form Mugen Juuoh (ムゲンジュウオウ).

| English name | Japanese name | Animal | Combination |
| Mugen Valvaro and RyuuDash | ムゲンバルバロ & リックダッシュ | Buildroid and Ostrich | Mugen Safari/Mugen Juuoh |
| Mugen Grand | ムゲングランド | Lion | Mugen Safari/Mugen Juuoh |
| Mugen Giraffe | ムゲンジュラフ | Giraffe | Mugen Safari/Mugen Juuoh |
| Mugen Kong | ムゲンコング | Gorilla | Mugen Safari/Mugen Juuoh |
| Mugen Zebra | ムゲンゼブラ | Zebra | Mugen Safari/Mugen Juuoh |
| Mugen Rhino | ムゲンライノ | Rhino | Mugen Safari/Mugen Juuoh |
| Muburibine | ムブリバイン | Buildroid | Mugen Ryuuborn/Mugen Juuoh |
| Lionbine | ライオンバイン | Lion | Mugen Ryuuborn/Mugen Juuoh |
| Gorillabine | ゴリラバイン | Gorilla | Mugen Ryuuborn/Mugen Juuoh |
| Reachbine | リーチバイン | Giraffe | Mugen Ryuuborn/Mugen Juuoh |
| Kickbine | キックバイン | Zebra | Mugen Ryuuborn/Mugen Juuoh |
| Tacklebine | タックルバイン | Rhino | Mugen Ryuuborn/Mugen Juuoh |

Series fifteen - Mugen Super Demon Beasts (ムゲン超魔獣)
The Fifteenth line of the Mugenbine Candy Toys is stated to be released in January 2010 and it will have an Evil Magic theme unlike the first 14 Mugenbine Candy Toy releases. It has six units that combines into Mugen Satan (ムゲンサタン) and it was counted as the third official villain in the Mugenbine franchise after both Xenonbine and Death Emperor.

| English name | Japanese name | Animal | Combination |
| Mugen Devil | ムゲンデビル | Devil | Mugen Satan |
| Mugen Heracles | ムゲンギガクレス | Hercules beetle | Mugen Satan |
| Mugen Griffon | ムゲングリフォン | Griffin | Mugen Satan |
| Mugen Vulture | ムゲンバルチャ | Vulture | Mugen Satan |
| Mugen Gazelle | ムゲンガイゼル | Gazelle | Mugen Satan |
| Mugen Killer Whale | ムゲンキラーホエール | Killer whale | Mugen Satan |

=== Gakuen Gattai Moebine series (学炎合体モエバイン) ===
Inspired by Mugenbine, The Moebine is a new series of Mugenbine Candy Toys released in 2009. It features cute anime-style Bine Girls (which inspired on Busou Shinki) accompanied with their Bine Mates, which can Bine Cross with their respective girls to give them powerful weapons.

Ninjutsu Club edition
The First Lineup of the Moebine collection. The Ninjutsu Club edition consists of Takane Endou & Homura Hawk, Kyouko Kamitsuki & Fuuma Viper, Tamami Kamaguchi & Raiden Toad, Uruha Oogami & Kouga Wolf, and Sarii Sarutobi & Shinobi Ape. Each Bine Girl is incredibly poseable with thirty points of articulation to play with, and all five of their Bine Mates (バインメイト) can Super Bine Cross to form the Mitsurugi Kaizer (ミツルギカイザー) robot. The Bine Mates can also be combined in another way to form Homura Kaizer (ホムラカイザー). Also the Bine Mates has compatibility with the previous Mugenbine Toys.

| Girl name | Bine mate | Animal | Combiner |
| Takane Endou (炎堂タカネ) | Homura Hawk (ホムラホーク) | Hawk | Mitsurugi Kaizer/Homura Kaizer |
| Kyouko Kamitsuki (上月キョウコ) | Fuuma Viper (フウマバイパー) | Viper | Mitsurugi Kaizer/Homura Kaizer |
| Tamami Kamaguchi (鎌口タマミ) | Raiden Toad (ライデントード) | Toad | Mitsurugi Kaizer/Homura Kaizer |
| Uruha Oogami (大神ウルハ) | Kouga Wolf (コウガウルフ) | Wolf | Mitsurugi Kaizer/Homura Kaizer |
| Sarii Sarutobi (申飛サリィ) | Shinobi Ape (シノビエイプ) | Ape | Mitsurugi Kaizer/Homura Kaizer |

=== Evolbine ===
Based loosely on the egg prizes from coin machines. The Evolbine series (katakana: エヴォルバイン - sometimes incorrectly romanized as "Evobine") are made up of five figures that each "evolve" from an egg to a hatchling to a beast form. The five eggs and their parts also have a combiner mode.

Series I - Mugen Burning (ムゲンバーニング)

| Bine name | Animal | Combiner |
| Burning Feather (バーニングフェザー) | Bird | Mugen Burning |
| Burning Liger (バーニングライガー) | Lion | Mugen Burning |
| Burning Frog (バーニングフロッグ) | Frog | Mugen Burning |
| Burning Beetle (バーニングビートル) | Beetle | Mugen Burning |
| Burning Rex (バーニングレックス) | Tyrannosaurus | Mugen Burning |

Series II - Mugen Tornado (ムゲントルネード) and Mugen Storm (ムゲンストーム)

| Bine name | Animal | Combiner |
| Tornado Scale (トルネードスケイル) | Water Drake | Mugen Tornado |
| Tornado Fang (トルネードファング) | Wolf | Mugen Tornado |
| Tornado Crow (トルネードクロー) | Bird | Mugen Tornado |
| Tornado Stag (トルネードスタッグ) | Beetle | Mugen Tornado |
| Tornado Horn (トルネードホーン) | Bull | Mugen Tornado |

| Bine name | Animal | Combiner |
| Storm Scale (ストームスケイル) | Water Drake | Mugen Storm |
| Storm Fang (ストームファング) | Wolf | Mugen Storm |
| Storm Crow (ストームクロー) | Bird | Mugen Storm |
| Storm Stag (ストームスタッグ) | Beetle | Mugen Storm |
| Storm Horn (ストームホーン) | Bull | Mugen Storm |

Series III - Mugen Lightning (ムゲンライトニング)

| Bine name | Animal | Combiner |
| Thunder Seiryu (サンダーセイリュウ) | Dragon | Mugen Kaiser/Thunder Dragon |
| Thunder Byakko (サンダービャッコ) | Tiger | Mugen Kaiser/Thunder Dragon |
| Thunder Suzaku (サンダースザク) | Phoenix | Mugen Kaiser/Thunder Dragon |
| Thunder Genbu (サンダーゲンブ) | Turtle | Mugen Kaiser/Thunder Dragon |
| ThunderRoid (サンダーロイド) | Robot | Mugen Kaiser/Thunder Dragon |

== Storyline ==
Little backstory is given for the Mugenbine toyline aside besides commercials and the back of toy packaging.

According to fiction from the commercials, the story takes place in Mugenpolis (ムゲンポリス), where the first Mugenbine, Air Leon, was developed, soon followed by Build Giraffe and Carry Eagle, designed to counter emergencies in the city. The only villain seen is Xenonbine, an evil Mugenbine capable of more combinations than any of the others at the time. The commercials also explained the characters Great Rex, Heat Tricera, and Zord Elephant were created by Mugenbine's North American branch. After Victory Leon is created to serve as a gateway to the city, the commercials begin referring to it as Mugen City (ムゲンシティ), and introduced the Mugen Bases. Arch Tiger's commercial also implies an unseen, ominous enemy as its appearance causes the sky to turn purple. There is also a side story featuring the Ridebine characters who are searching for legendary weapons, a theme supported by the manga included with these figures where they battle a machine monster powered by these weapons, as well as their inclusion with numerous Teiouryu figures as "prize parts", the weapon parts from Assault Leon, Energy Rhinoce, and Great Rex molded in gold plastic.

At some point, the storyline on the packages tell that the Mugenroids are taken over and turn against the city. As a result, the Buildroids are created, with human pilots that could not be controlled. They're left as the only protectors of Mugen City in the face of the new threat. The storyline is presumed to be ongoing as the most recent toy releases also includes a pilot figure.

== See also ==
Machine Robo
