= Robo Machine =

Toy line

Robo Machine was a European transforming robot toyline released by Bandai from 1982 to 1988. Robo Machines was a short-lived revival from late 1992 to 1993. The line was initially a European release of the Machine Robo line, before gradually becoming the counterpart to Tonka’s Gobots line. The line appeared in the UK, France and Germany, amongst others.

== Early years ==
The line was initially a straight import of the Machine Robo line, with the ‘600 Series’ and other figures released on blister cards, and featuring the literal designations that adorned the Japanese toys. The toy codes were also retained, though the “MR” abbreviation was reversed as “RM”. The packaging of larger figures revealed a back story along the lines of the Japanese series, with the Machine Robo mecha being used to defend Earth from the alien Devil Invaders. The Battle Suits were also issued at this stage.

== GoBots ==
In 1983, Tonka purchased the rights to distribute Machine Robo in America, and began refashioning it into the GoBot line. Bandai began to adapt elements of this line, notably the idea of the mecha being individual robots and naming them (generally using the GoBot names). During this phase, a wider range of figures was issued, including the Super GoBots, Puzzler and the playsets. Later on, as the animated Challenge of the GoBots series began appearing in Europe, the line went through a period of rebranding, becoming known by a variety of names, including Challenge of the GoBots – A Robo Machine Product or Robo Machine featuring Challenge of the Gobots. The line began to parallel the American one more closely (with American names being used on all figures), and gradually petered out after that range failed.

== Media ==
The only true Robo Machines media produced in Europe was a comic serial in the British Eagle comic, which ran from 10 November 1984 to 29 July 1985. This depicted the battle between Ex-El’s Security Forces and Stron-Domez’ criminal Robo Machines. As the comic went on, GoBot terms such as Guardian began to appear. The main human character, Charlie Bampton, appeared later in the series, and was shown to possess the powers of ESP and telekinesis. Later media tied in more closely with the Challenge of the GoBots continuity.

== Differences from Japanese & American Lines ==
- Some figures from the Japanese line were released in Europe that did not come out in America (the Apollo rocket mold, for example) – three of the Double Machine Robo were issued as Combinators, while the Deluxe vehicles from Bandai’s Zenmai Kahen Winch Robo line were also issued. Both of these ranges came without individual names, thought the Toyota New Hi-Lux is often referred to as "The Winch" or "Winch Robo".
- Several colour schemes were different from the American releases – figures such as Slicks, Herr Fiend and Night Ranger were issued in their Japanese schemes, while several others, such as Gunnyr and Carry-All were given brand new schemes.
- MR-45, the Blackbird Robo, was originally scheduled to be part of the Gobot line as the Renegade Snoop, but failed to appear in the toyline despite the character featuring in the cartoon series. Initially the toy was released in Europe as Sky-Spy.
- Bandai used the Robo Machine brand for many robot toys with minimal connection to Gobots - a motorized remote control non-transforming robot was issued under the banner as the Robot Arm Machine and a non-motorized one was referred to as Robot Kong. Toys from the Godaikin and Dancougar lines were issued with the branding too.
- Several figures were given different names from their American counterparts:

Gobot Name	Robo Machine Name
Wrong Way	Sky Gun
Twin Spin	Carry-All
Road Ranger	Truck
Vamp	Casmodon
Pincher	Falgos
Scorp	Zarios
Bad Boy	Tank-Bust

However, later in the line these would fall in line with the American standard.

- Similarly, several assortments were renamed – the Powersuits were known as Battle Suits, while the names Puzzler and Zod were used as subset names for combining robots and more traditional action figures, respectively.

== Revival ==
A selection of figures from the Robo Machines toyline

In 1993, Bandai attempted to relaunch the line as Robo Machines, using toys from the Machine Robo CG Robo line, as well as some from the 1980s series. Due to all the Gobot trademarks being owned by Hasbro, the figures were largely issued with designations once again, rather than names. It was not a financial success, and was cancelled after one year. It was meant as an attempt to revive the European Robo Machine toyline that ran from 1982 to approximately 1988. It incorporated several toys previously released in the Machine Robo and Robo Machine toy-lines, and five new toys that previously had only been released in Japan as part of the CG Robo toy-line.

== About Robo Machines ==
The Robo Machines toy line featured a total of 27 transforming robot figures, and was released by Bandai in France, Germany, the United Kingdom, Ireland, Belgium, Spain, and the Netherlands. Giochi Preziosi, Bandai's agent in Italy, handled the release in that country. 22 of the figures were reissues of figures that were previously released as part of the Robo Machine toy-line. Of these, 16 were 'regular'-sized figures (simply referred to as "Robo Machines") and 6 were "De Luxe" figures. Furthermore, 5 figures previously unreleased outside Japan were sold as "Light & Sound" Robo Machines.

=== The Regular-sized Robo Machines ===
Sixteen regular-sized Robo machines were released, in series of five. The first series had its line-up changed somewhere along the way to replace 'Harrier' with 'P-51'. All had been released as Gobots between 1983 and 1986, and the majority originated from Bandai's Machine Robo '600 Series'. Exact names varied according to market - those given are for the United Kingdom.

Name	Vehicle Mode
Aircraft	F4U Corsair
Classic Car	Classic Style Excalibur
F-15	F-15 Eagle
F-16	F-16 Falcon
Harrier	Hawker Siddeley Harrier
Helicopter I	AH-64 Apache
Helicopter II	SH-2 Seasprite
Light Plane	Cessna
Motor Bike	Harley-Davidson FL Electa-Glide
P-51	P-51 Mustang
Scooter	Scooter
Sports Car	Porsche 956
Submarine	Submarine
Thunderbolt	A-10 Thunderbolt II
Transport Helicopter	CH-46 Sea Knight
Zero	A6M Zero

=== The De Luxe Robo Machines ===
Six De Luxe Robo Machines were released - these figures had been released as Super Gobots in America. Three figures (De Luxe Beetle, De Luxe Sports Car I and De Luxe Sports Car 2) originally came from the Machine Robo DX series, two (De Luxe F-15 and De Luxe Space Shuttle) from the Big Machine Robo series, and one (De Luxe Motorcycle) had been issued only as a Gobot. Exact names varied according to market - those given are for the United Kingdom.

Name	Vehicle Mode
De Luxe Beetle	Volkswagen Beetle
De Luxe F-15	F-15 Eagle
De Luxe Motorcycle	BMW K100RS
De Luxe Space Shuttle	Space Shuttle
De Luxe Sports Car I	Porsche 911
De Luxe Sports Car II	Porsche 928S

=== The Light & Sound Robo Machines ===
Five Light & Sound Robo Machines were released. Originally from Bandai's Machine Robo CG ('Change and Glow') Robo 1992 series, these were the only toys from the range to get names, as opposed to designations (in the United Kingdom, at least - designations seem to have been used in other markets). The figures had flashing lights and siren sounds.

! #	Name	Vehicle Mode
01	Chaser	Mitsubishi GTO Police Cruiser
02	Fire Chief	Fire engine
03	SOS	Ambulance
04	Mega Truck	Flatbed Truck
05	Rough Rider	4x4
