= Machine Robo =

Japanese media franchise

- Created by: Bandai
- Owner: Bandai
- Years: 1982–present

Films and television
- Film(s): See below
- Television series: See below

Miscellaneous
- Toy(s): Chogokin; DX Toys; Super MiniPla / Shokugan Modelling Project
- Genre: Science fiction Mecha

Machine Robo (マシンロボ, Mashin Robo) is a Japanese transforming robot toyline first released in 1982 by Popy, a division of Bandai, then later by Bandai proper. The franchise was marketed as Robo Machine in Europe and Machine Men in Australia. A large portion of these toys were exported to North America as part of Tonka's Gobots series, which began in 1983.

== Overview ==
The initial assortment of Machine Robos consisted of small toy robots which transformed into vehicles, aircraft, etc., comparable in size to Matchbox cars. These early MR toys have become known as the "600 series" (being priced at ¥600 each), and were developed through ideas submitted by children, similar to the children's submissions in the Kinnikuman anime series. Larger-scale deluxe ("DX") toys were soon released, along with other non-transforming vehicles and figures.

== Incarnations by era ==
=== Showa Era ===
The first era of Machine Robo began in 1982 with the release of the 600 series by Popy. According to Bandai, the development for the line began back in 1980 and almost took more than a year to develop. Despite its low price, the toyline was positively received due to its details including its die-cast metal body, clear parts and in some toys, inclusion of rubber tires.

The toyline was imported to the west by toy manufacturer Tonka and released under the name Gobots, with its animated series released in 1984, which became a success upon release. Both in Japan and in the West, Machine Robo's main competition was The Transformers, whose animated series debuted in Japan in 1985.

With the success of the Gobots cartoon in America, Bandai decided to team up with Ashi Productions to produce Revenge of Cronos, which debuted in 1986. Upon the release of the anime also comes the rerelease of the 600 series to coincide with the show alongside newer toys such as the MRC DX Pile Formation Set Baikunfu, a redeco of the DX Chogokin Gordian Warrior among many others. It was soon followed with a second series Machine Robo: Battle Hackers in 1987, also animated by Ashi Productions which also introduced new toys to the series. Several OVAs for Revenge of Cronos were produced from 1988 to 1990.

In 1988, the Winner Robo line was released.

=== Heisei Era ===
Bandai later introduced the CG Robo (シージーロボ, Shījī Robo) line in 1993. The "CG" is short for "Change & Glow", pointing to the fact that this line of 14 figures not only transformed, but also had working lights and sounds. CG-01 to CG-05 were released in Europe with minor changes as part of the Robo Machines toyline.

After the release of the CG Robo, the franchise became fully dormant for 11 years until Bandai released the "Machine Robo GP" line of Capsule Toys was released as the first product bearing the "Machine Robo" name in 13 years.

Bandai fully rebooted the franchise once more with the release of new line of toys, dubbed the "Rescue Gattai Series", which all focus on combination with each sub robot (which serves its limbs) can be swapped out to another toy for several combinations. Its accompanying anime series, Machine Robo Rescue was produced by Sunrise in 2003, which also marked the franchise's 20th anniversary.

After Machine Robo Rescue concluded, Bandai launched Machine Robo Mugenbine in the same year, which its core gimmick is that it uses numerous interlocking pegs and sockets to attach and remove components and relocate them in order to form different modes and combinations. Mugenbine ran up to 2009 as the core toyline until it was discontinued and the Candy Toy version of it ran up to 2019. In 2007, Bandai released a new iteration of the Baikunfu as part of the more adult-oriented Soul of Chogokin line.

In 2012, Bandai launched the Machine Robo NEXT candy toy line in commemoration to the franchise's 30th anniversary. 2019 also saw the release of Machine Robo Duel line as part of the Minipla subline of toys, alongside the Baikanfu getting a release under the Super Minipla / Shokugan Modelling Project line.

=== Reiwa Era ===
In 2022, Bandai released the latest generation of the franchise: UNITROBORN: Machine Robo Universe in July 2022. The main gimmick of the new line revolves around organic / inorganic combinations with both everyday items are combined to create a new Machine Robo. The toyline won the excellence award at the 2022 Japan Toy Show. In the same year, Megahouse announced that a new line of transformable Machine Robo figures under the Machine Builder line. The first figure is released in December 2022.

== Animated series ==
The first Machine Robo animated series was Challenge of the Gobots, which aired in the United States from 1984 to 1985. The second series was Machine Robo: Revenge of Cronos, which aired in Japan from 1986 to 1987. There were some further straight-to-video adventures released from 1988 to 1990 that featured some characters from this anime. The third series was Machine Robo: Battle Hackers, which aired in 1987. The fourth and latest animated series was Machine Robo Rescue, which aired from 2003 to 2004.

- Challenge of the Gobots
  - Gobots: Battle of the Rock Lords (1986 movie)
- Machine Robo: Revenge of Cronos
- Machine Robo: Battle Hackers
- Leina Stol in Wolf Sword Legend
- Lightning Trap - Leina & Laika
- Machine Robo Rescue

== Sources ==
- マシンからロボットへ、驚異の変形メカ軍団!!−マシンロボ [From Machines to Robots, an Amazing Transforming Mecha Army! - Machine Robo]. Figure Oh (in Japanese). No. 294. World Photo Press. 2022-08-30. ISBN 978-4-8465-3276-5.
