= Gordian Warrior =

Japanese anime television series

- Gordian the Warrior
- Cover of the first DVD box set

闘士ゴーディアン (Tōshi Gōdian)
- Genre: Mecha, superhero, sci fi, sci-fi western
- Anime television series
- Directed by: Masamune Ochiai; Kunihiko Okazaki
- Produced by: Masatsugu Nagai; Tomoyuki Miyata
- Written by: Yu Yamamoto
- Music by: Masaaki Jinbo; Masayuki Yamamoto
- Studio: Tatsunoko Production
- Original network: Tokyo Channel 12
- Original run: October 7, 1979 – February 27, 1981
- Episodes: 73

Gordian Warrior (闘士ゴーディアン, Tōshi Gōdian) is a Japanese anime television series that aired in 1979 to 1981. The story took place in a futuristic Spaghetti Western-like setting, and made frequent use of the tropes associated to the genre, such as Wild West landscapes, western film musical motifs, cowboys, gunfighters and outlaws, while also using the traditional aesthetic and signature comic relief found in many Tatsunoko Pro anime series. The series was notable for its excellent character design and compelling storytelling, although it made use of cheaply produced animation and relatively low production values. 73 episodes were produced. It is also known as Fighter Gordian, Champion of Gordian or Gardian.

== Original story ==
In the distant future, after a global cataclysm caused by a radioactive meteor that came critically close to the terrestrial orbit, Earth has become a wasteland as the survivors work to rebuild communities. Genius scientist Kyōtarō Otaki designed a technologically advanced city to protect and preserve mankind in case of a catastrophe in the future. Daigo Ōtaki is a young orphan raised by his uncle. As a teenager, Daigo discovers that Victor City (also known as Victor Town in the original japanese and in some translations) was a planned city designed by his scientist father Kyōtarō. Daigo's sister Saori has secretly managed it for years. Eventually, she encounters Daigo and pleads with him to take on the inheritance that their father left him, a super robot system known as Gordian. Followed by his trusty robotic panther companion Clint, Daigo joins the Mechacon mechanical combat 18th regiment unit, an organization of law enforcers that defend Victor City against attacks from the evil Madokter Army (マドクター軍団, Madokutā Gundan) organization, whose goal is to obtain the secret advanced technology hidden in the depths of Victor City.

== Concept ==
The Gordian robotic defense system consists of three mechanical exoskeletons (or exosuit), of different size relative to each other. Each one is best suited for situations according to its size and individual capabilities, each one possessing unique skills and attacks. The smallest exoskeletons are capable of combining by jumping inside of each other, from smallest to largest. Gordian is at his most powerful when three robots are combined and contained inside each other. All three were encoded to Daigo Ōtaki's DNA by his father, making him the sole person able to pilot them, as evidenced by the attempt to use Gordian by his sister Saori, which left her gravely wounded and burned, almost at the cost of her life. As the pilot, Daigo first must enter the smallest exoskeleton, the almost human-sized robot container named Protteser. Modeled after a quarterback, he is armed with the Gordian Bomb (ゴーディアンボム, Gōdian Bomu), a powerful pigskin-like bouncing projectile, and he is the quickest and most maneuverable. When Protteser is outnumbered or surpassed in strength, he jumps into the next exoskeleton container named Delinger, with which Daigo can handle stronger opponents or face more dangerous situations and can wield the Red Shine Sword (赤光剣, Shakkōken), a powerful sword. Then finally the largest exoskeleton is Garbin. When the three are combined and interface, Gordian has access to his highest power level and arsenal.

== Characters ==
Japanese name	Voices by
Daigo Ōtaki	Yoshito Yasuhara
Peachy	Yō Inoue
Barry Hawke	Rokurō Naya
Dalph	Kiyonobu Suzuki
Unknown G	Hiroshi Masuoka
Saori Ōtaki	Gara Takashima
Roset	Rihoko Yoshida
Chokoma	Reiko Suzuki
Emperor Dogma	Yasuo Muramatsu
Erias	Yoshino Ohtori
Klorias	Yūsaku Yara
Anita	Kazue Komiya
Tross Cross/Narrator	Masatō Ibu

== Staff ==
- Series directors
  Masamune Ochiai
  Kunihiko Okazaki
- Series composition
  Yu Yamamoto
- Design
  Ippei Kuri
- Animator
  Kazuhiko Udagawa
- Music
  Masaaki Jinbo
  Masayuki Yamamoto

== Merchandise ==
The original released toy set comes with all 3 robots and the human pilot. The 3 robots ranking from biggest to smallest, Garbin, Delinger, Protteser were respectively released as GB-11, GB-10, GB-09 by Popy pleasure. Their upper sternum is also numbered 3, 2, 1, though these numbers do not appear in the cartoon at all. It was sold in the US as "Gardian" under the Godaikin line. Gordian was later reappropriated as Baikanfū in Machine Robo: Revenge of Cronos.

== Availability outside Japan ==
Anime Sols funded the legal streaming of the show in the early 2010s. The series was also moderately popular in Latin America, Italy and France during the late eighties and was broadcast by local tv networks. The series is also available in DVD box sets and it can be also found on some streaming platforms.

== Sources ==
- Ishizuki, Saburo. Alt, Matt. Duban, Robert. Brisko Tim [2005] (2005). Super #1 Robot: Japanese Robot Toys 1972–1982. San Francisco: Chronicle Books LLC. ISBN 0-8118-4607-5
