= Going Under (1991 film) =

Comedy film directed by Mark W. Travis

- Directed by: Mark W. Travis
- Written by: Randolph Davis; Darryl Zarubica
- Produced by: Randolph Davis; Fred T. Gallo; Darryl Zarubica
- Starring: Bill Pullman; Wendy Schaal; Ned Beatty
- Cinematography: Victor Hammer
- Edited by: Paul Seydor
- Music by: David Michael Frank
- Production company: Warner Bros. Pictures
- Distributed by: Warner Bros. Pictures
- Release date: August 23, 1991
- Running time: 80 minutes
- Country: United States
- Language: English

Going Under (also known as Dive!) is a 1991 American comedy film starring Bill Pullman, Wendy Schaal, Chris Demetral, Tyrone Granderson Jones, Dennis Redfield, Lou Richards, Ernie Sabella, Elmarie Wendel, Ned Beatty, Robert Vaughn, and Roddy McDowall. The film was directed by Mark W. Travis and written by Randolph Davis and Darryl Zarubica.

== Plot ==
An American submarine races to get a nuclear weapon before a Russian submarine.

== Cast ==
- Bill Pullman as Biff Banner
- Wendy Schaal as Jan Michaels
- Chris Demetral as Apple
- Tyrone Granderson Jones as Quizby
- Dennis Redfield as Turbo
- Lou Richards as Skiff
- Ernie Sabella as The Mole
- Elmarie Wendel as Sonar
- Ned Beatty as Admiral Malice
- Robert Vaughn as Wedgewood
- Roddy McDowall as Secretary Neighbor
- Richard Masur as Defense Contractor
- John Moschitta as Defense Contractor
- Joe Namath as Captain Joe Namath
- Rif Hutton as Dr. Friendly
- Michael Winslow as Reporter
- Dianne Turley Travis as Secretary to Wedgewood
- Shawne Zarubica aa Tour Guide
- Frank Bonner as Soviet General
- Andrea Stein as Soviet General
- Artur Cybulski as Soviet Captain
- Ivan G'Vera as Soviet Sonar Man
- Darryl Zarubica as Soviet Sub Technician
- Tad Horino as Japanese Captain
- Dayton Callie as General Confusion
- Richard Carlyle as General Air Quality
- Bill DeLand as General Alert
- Hal England as General Telephone
- Tom Fuccello as General Leegood
- William A. Porter as General Electric
- Tom Dahlgren as U.S. Admiral
- Alan Toy as U.S. Tracking Technician
- Haskell V. Anderson III as Bongo Crewman
- Clayton Landey as O'Neill
- Nicholas Mele as Wimmer
- G. Smokey Campbell as Shore Patrol
- Andrew Parks as Shore Patrol
- Dean Cain as Guy in Bar
- Eddie Frierson as Guy in Bar
- Richard Kuhlman as Guy in Bar
- Joseph Hardin as Guy in Bar
- Richard Evans as Shipyard Worker
- Mark Haining as Shipyard Worker
- Ken Fording as Bartender

== Production ==
Going Under was filmed in 1990 as Dive!.

== Release ==
Although never released in theaters, Going Under was released on VHS on August 23, 1991. The film can be streamed online by Amazon Video via Warner Home Video.

== Reception ==
TV Guide gave Going Under 2 stars out of 5 stars. In Hal Erickson's book Military Comedy Films: A Critical Survey and Filmography of Hollywood Releases Since 1918, he writes: "Unlike A Man Called Sarge, Going Under actually indicates that some thought and money went into its preparation. While the production values are not lavish, they are at least up to 1990s theatrical feature standards."

== See also ==
- List of American films of 1991
- List of comedy films of the 1990s

== Bibliography ==
- Erikson, Hal (2012). Military Comedy Films: A Critical Survey and Filmography of Hollywood Releases Since 1918. New York City: McFarland & Company. ISBN 978-0786462902.
- Fowler, Stacy; Deacon, Deborah A. (2019). A Century in Uniform: Military Women in American. New York City: McFarland & Company. p. 111. ISBN 978-1476677132.
- Willis, John (2000). Screen World 1992 Vol. 43. Milwaukee: Applause Theatre & Cinema Books. p. 164. ISBN 978-1557831354.
