= Takatoku Toys =

Japanese toy company

Takatoku toys (株式会社タカトクトイス, kabushiki gaisha Takatoku Toisu) was a Japanese toy company active during the 1970s and early 1980s. While responsible for many robots, action-figures and vehicles, they are today mainly known for making the original Macross toys.

During the 1970s Takatoku made toys based on shows such as Ultraman Leo, Hurricane Polimar, and even Mach Go Go Go (years after the show had aired). They produced die-cast character-toys including the Z-Gokin line as well a wide range of other types.

== Kanzen Henkei ==
When the real robot craze hit in the early 1980s Takatoku adapted by changing the style of their toys. The turning point came in 1982 when they produced toys for Macross (1982–83) with the focus on the transforming VF-1 Valkyrie. Designed by Shoji Kawamori, the Valkyrie was a very complex design at the time and a transforming toy seemed unlikely. Up to this point transforming toys were usually rather crude and tended to focus purely on one mode at the expense of the other(s). A "vehicle mode" might simply be the robot flat on its belly with wheels or wings on the sides.

Working with Kawamori, Takatoku was able to design a transforming 1/55 scale toy of the Valkyrie which was dubbed kanzen henkei ("perfect transformation"). While not exactly a perfect rendition of the Valkyrie it was still (for a toy) very accurate and could transform to all 3 modes. Thanks to good marketing the KH toy became a big hit and sold well over a million units. It now appears crude next to modern designs but is still widely regarded as a masterpiece by collectors.

Even so, sales generated by the Macross line was not enough to sustain the company when subsequent shows made in 1983-84 were not as successful including Sasuraiger and the Macross "sibling" Orguss. There was some hope with the movie version of Macross but Takatoku went under in early 1984 before it came out. Takatoku's last toys were for the unsuccessful Dorvack TV-series.

== Post-demise ==
After Takatoku's demise, their designs ended up in the hands of various other companies. Bandai got a hold of the Kanzen Henkei VF-1 Valkyrie, releasing toys for The Super Dimension Fortress Macross: Do You Remember Love? and made various re-issues later on. Hasbro also acquired the rights to the Valkyrie toy, which they used to make the character Jetfire while toys from Takatoku's Dorvack line were also converted into Transformers becoming Roadbuster and Whirl. Many Macross toys (but not the Kanzen Henkei) would be used by Matchbox for their Robotech line. A little-known company known as Select Toys used many smaller Dorvack, Macross, Orguss, and a series of transforming animal robots that Takatoku never released and called them Convertors.

== Sources ==
Takatoku Toys at TFWiki.net: The Transformers Wiki

ja:wikipedia:タカトクトイス
