= Transforming robots =

Toy concept

A transforming robot is a robot that can change to take on the appearance or form of another object. This type of robot was a very popular toy concept in the 1980s; such toy robots could typically morph from a humanoid form to that of a vehicle, animal, or commonplace object. The transformation generally was by physically folding/bending/twisting and locking the robot's parts into the new shape, and it very rarely involved disassembling (physically separating) the parts and re-assembling them.

Toylines that used this concept include:

- Brave Reideen (Bandai and Popy)
- Transformers (Hasbro and Takara Tomy), a very popular franchise with two robot factions that fought against each other. The robots could transform into a wide range of things, like cars, trucks, planes, trains, motorcycles and robot animals.
- Gobots and Machine Robo (Tonka, Bandai), mostly die-cast toy robots that could transform into machines like cars, trucks, trains, boats and airplanes
- Rock Lords (Tonka, Bandai), robots that could transform into rocks
- NEO Shifters (Mattel, Mega Brands), robots that could transform into flying spheres
- Changeables (McDonald's), could transform into food products such as french fries or hamburgers.
- Escaflowne figures were incredibly popular in Japan in 2005. They changed from a humanoid into a dragon.
- Switch & Go Dinos (VTech), vehicles which transform into dinosaurs.
- Diarobo (ダイヤロボ) (Agatsuma Ltd), road vehicles changed into humans, animals and dinosaurs.
- The VF-1 Valkyrie or variable fighter from the popular Macross/Robotech franchise.
- Convertors (Select) featured the conflict between heroic and evil factions, in this case the heroic Defenders (and their Avarian allies) and the evil Maladroids (and their Insectors allies).
