= Philip L. Clarke =

American voice actor (1938-2013)

- Born: September 8, 1938
- Died: April 23, 2013 (aged 74)
- Occupation: Voice actor

Philip Lewis Clarke (September 8, 1938 – April 23, 2013) was an American voice actor.

He provided voices in several TV series, films, and video games, including his leading role as Malcolm Betruger in Doom 3.

== Roles ==
- Walt Disney World EPCOT Center: A Souvenir Program - Narrator
- Oliver Twist - Additional Voices
- Devlin - Additional Voices
- Scooby-Doo and Scrappy-Doo
- Cataclysm - Additional Voices
- The Man Who Saw Tomorrow - Nostradamus
- The Smurfs - Additional Voices
- Spider-Man - Sidewinder/Wild Willie Wilson
- Meatballs and Spaghetti - Additional Voices
- The New Scooby-Doo and Scrappy-Doo Show - Additional Voices
- The Dukes - Additional Voices
- Challenge of the GoBots - Dr. Go, Tork
- Pole Position - Additional Voices
- CBS Storybreak - Additional Voices
- Starchaser: The Legend of Orin - Additional Voices
- GoBots: Battle of the Rock Lords - Herr Fiend, Crackpot, Tork
- The Transformers - Dead End, Tantrum, Auggie Cahnay, Abdul Fakkadi, Victor Drath, Marty Minkler, Ozu's sensei, Zeta Prime
- G.I. Joe - Matthew Burke
- Wildfire - Lord Sampson
- The Chipmunk Adventure - Additional Voices
- DuckTales - Additional Voices
- The Chipmunks - Additional Voices
- Popeye and Son - Additional Voices
- Inhumanoids - Harry Slattery/Dirty Beggar Sorcerer
- The Super Mario Bros. Super Show! - Computer
- The Little Mermaid - Sailor #3
- Beauty and the Beast - Male Villager
- An American Tail: Fievel Goes West - Male Mice
- Aladdin - Guards
- The Pirates of Dark Water - Additional Voices
- The Lion King - Hyenas
- The Pebble and the Penguin - King
- Skeleton Warriors - Baron Dark
- Adventures in Odyssey - Additional Voices
- The Hunchback of Notre Dame - Frollo's Soldiers
- The Fantastic Voyages of Sinbad the Sailor - Additional Voices
- Quest for Camelot - Ruber's Minions
- The Legend of Calamity Jane - Jeremiah Wilkinson

=== Video games ===
Year	Title	Role	Notes
1994	Cyberia	Additional Voices	
1995	Stonekeep	Karzak	
1997	Zork: Grand Inquisitor	Belboz, Perils of Magic Voice	
1999	Crusaders of Might and Magic	Additional Voices	
2000	Ground Control	Cardinal Aegeri, Squad Voice, Dropship Voice #4	
2001	Warriors of Might and Magic	Zash Mistra	
2004	The Bard's Tale		
2004	Doom 3	Dr. Malcolm Betruger	
2005	Doom 3: Resurrection of Evil	Malcolm Betruger	
2005	Agatha Christie: And Then There Were None	Judge Wargrave, U.N. Owen	
2007	Company of Heroes: Opposing Fronts	The General	
