= Wendy Schaal =

American actress (born 1954)

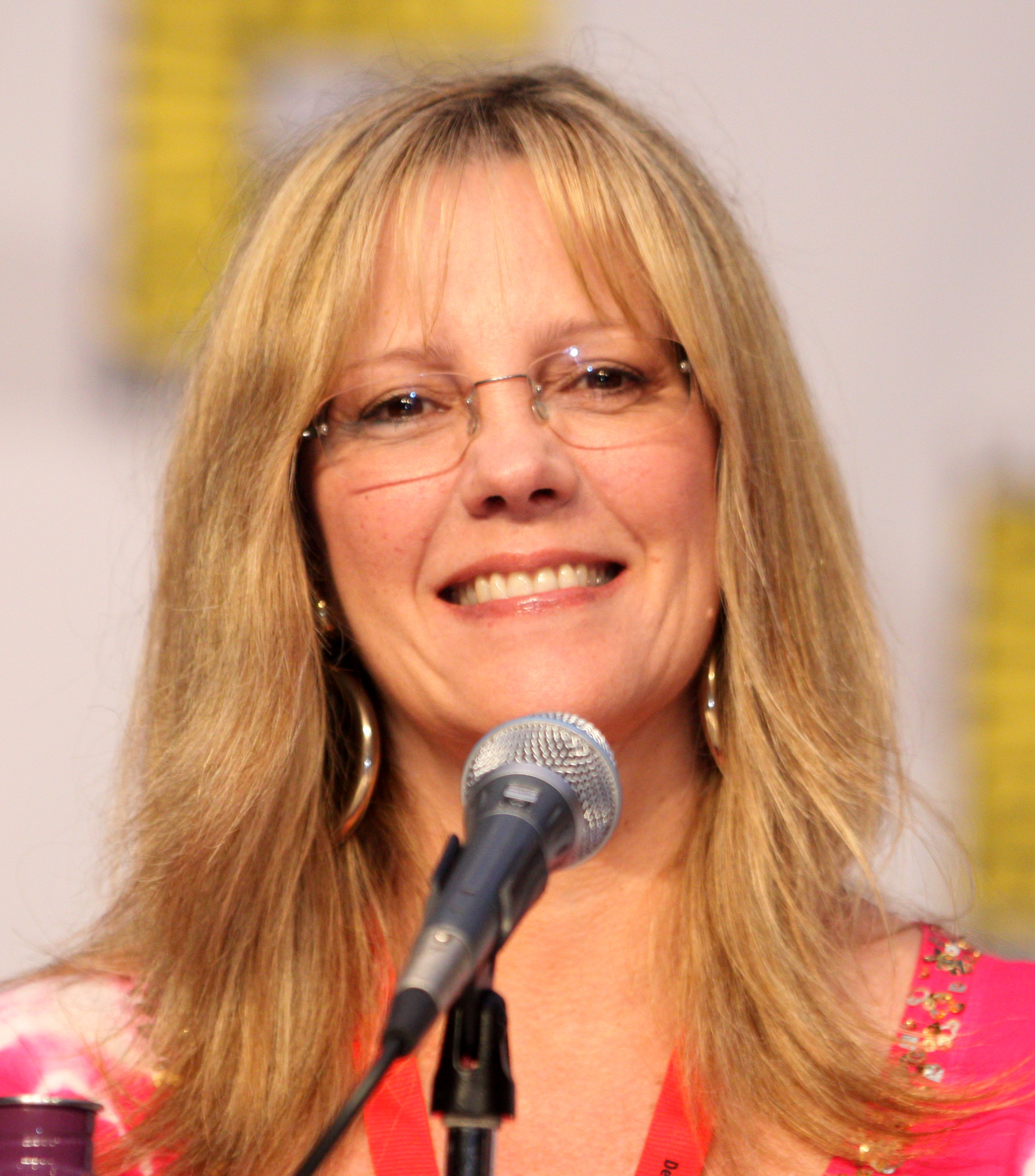
- Schaal in 2010
- Born: July 2, 1954 (age 72); Chicago, Illinois, U.S.
- Education: Los Angeles City College (AA)
- Occupation: Actress
- Years active: 1975–present
- Known for: Innerspace; The 'Burbs; Small Soldiers; American Dad!
- Spouse: Stephen M. Schwartz (m. 1977; div. 1987)
- Children: 1
- Father: Richard Schaal

Wendy Schaal (born July 2, 1954) is an American actress known for her work in Joe Dante films, such as Innerspace, The 'Burbs, and Small Soldiers. Her other film credits include starring in Where the Boys Are '84, Creature, Going Under, and Munchies. She had many roles on television series in the 1980s, most notably as Vicki Allen on It's a Living and Marilyn Kelsy on Airwolf. Since 2005, she has primarily worked in voice acting, most notably voicing Francine Smith on the animated comedy television series American Dad!

== Early years ==
Schaal was born in Chicago, Illinois, the daughter of Lois Schaal (née Treacy) and actor Richard Schaal. Schaal's father was married to actress Valerie Harper from 1964 to 1978, during which time Harper was her stepmother. From birth until she was five, Schaal lived with her parents in Crete, Illinois. She moved with her mother to Newport Beach, California after her parents divorced. Schaal studied acting with Viola Spolin in Chicago when she was nine years old, later moving to Wisconsin and then California when she was 11. When she was 14, a trip to New York to be with her father and Harper soon led her to California again when her father and stepmother chose to settle in Hollywood.

Schaal earned an Associate of Arts degree from Los Angeles City College, acting and working in set construction. After she attended an acting workshop led by her father, she began to work on television.

== Career ==
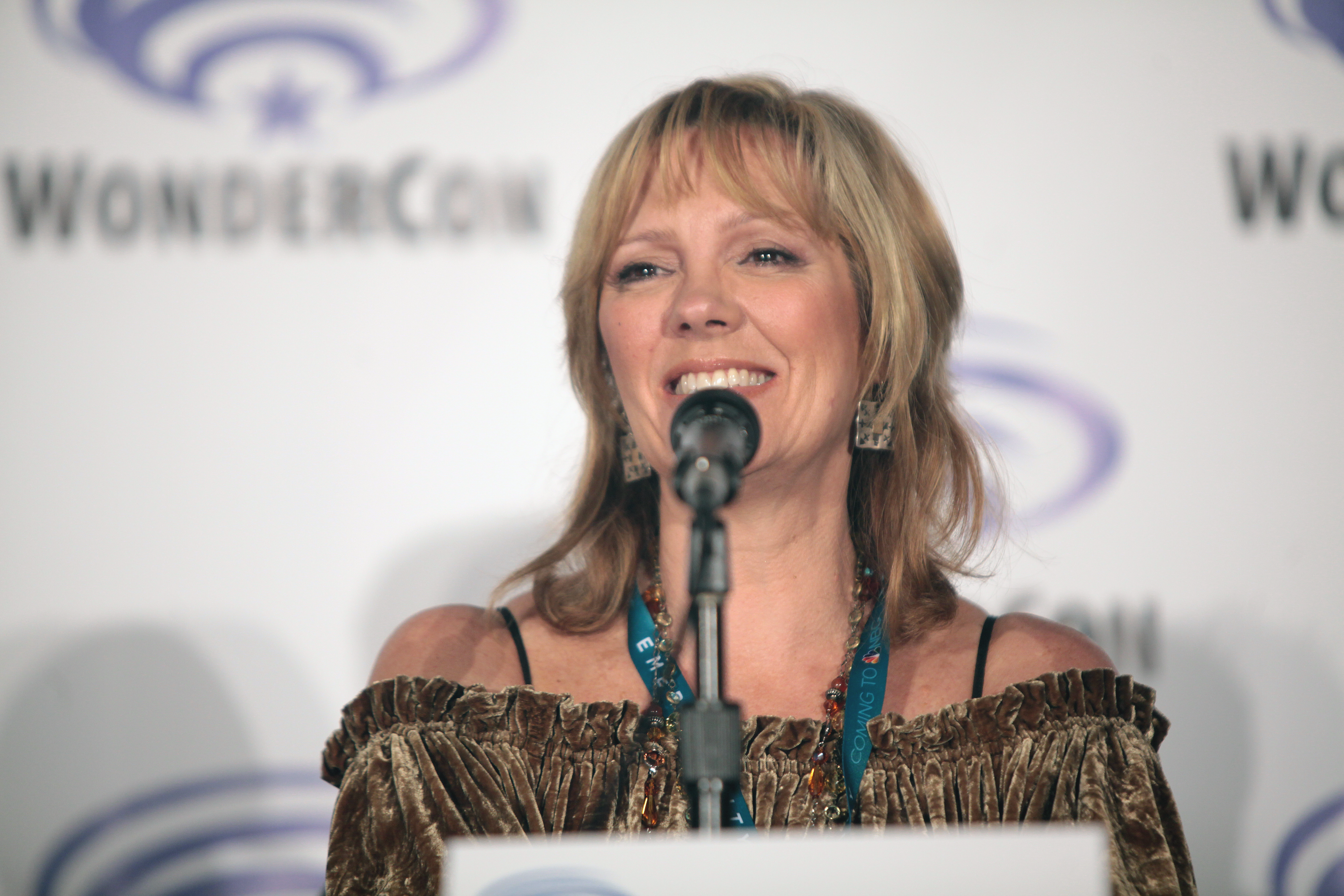
Wendy Schaal speaking at the 2016 WonderCon Los Angeles for American Dad!, at the Los Angeles Convention Center

Schaal's early work on television included roles on Fish, Little House on the Prairie, Phyllis, Rhoda, and Welcome Back, Kotter. In 1981, Schaal joined the cast of the ABC-TV series Fantasy Island, portraying Julie, the niece of the program's central character, Mr. Roarke. Her other roles on TV included Bonnie Hornback in AfterMASH, Debbie Pepper in Good Grief, Vickie Allen in It's a Living, and Liz Dooley in Nearly Departed. She also provides the voice of Francine Smith in the cartoon series American Dad!

== Personal life ==
Schaal was married to Stephen M. Schwartz on September 4, 1977, but divorced in October 1987. They have one son.

== Union activism ==
On March 30, 2012, the Screen Actors Guild (SAG) and the American Federation of Television and Radio Artists (AFTRA) completed a merger of equals forming a new union SAG-AFTRA. As a result of this merger, a group of actors including Schaal, fellow voice actors Michael Bell, Clancy Brown, Schaal's former stepmother Valerie Harper, and other actors including former SAG President Edward Asner, Martin Sheen, Ed Harris, and Nancy Sinatra immediately sued the incumbent SAG President Ken Howard and several SAG Vice Presidents to overturn the merger and separate the two unions because of their claims that the election was improper. The plaintiffs dropped their lawsuit several months later.

== Filmography ==
Film
Year	Title	Role	Notes
1976	Bound for Glory	Mary Jo Guthrie	
1978	Record City	Lorraine	
1984	Where the Boys Are '84	Sandra Roxbury	
1985	Creature	Beth Sladen	
1987	Munchies	Marge Mavalle	
1987	Innerspace	Wendy	
1987	Batteries Not Included	Pamela	
1989	The 'Burbs	Bonnie Rumsfield	
1991	Going Under	Jan Michaels	
1994	My Girl 2	Emily Pommeroy	
1995	Out There	Paige	
1998	Small Soldiers	Marion Fimple	
2001	Holiday in the Sun	Jill	
2005	Inside the CIA	Francine Smith (voice)	Short film
2006	Loving Annabelle	Senator Tillman	

Television
Year	Title	Role	Notes
1976	Welcome Back, Kotter	Girl in Hallway	Episode: "Sadie Hawkins Day"
1976	Rhoda	Jan	Recurring role (2 episodes)
1977	Fish	Peggy Dunnagan	Episode: "Fish's Job"
1979	Family	Sarah	Episode: "Malicious Mischief"
1979	Little House on the Prairie	Christie Norton	Episode: "Annabelle"
1980–1981	It's a Living	Vicki Allen	Main cast (13 episodes)
1981–1982	Fantasy Island	Julie	Main cast (19 episodes)
1982	Strike Force	Mandy	Episode: "Chinatown"
1982	Happy Days	Lorraine	Episode: "Since I Don't Have You"
1982–83	The Love Boat	Elaine Hamilton / Millicent Finley	S6 E9 / S7 E14
1983	AfterMASH	Bonnie Hornback	Recurring role (5 episodes)
1984	Fatal Vision	Colette MacDonald	Miniseries
1984	Cover Up	Rebecca	Episode: "Midnight Highway"
1985	Knight Rider	Jamie Downs	Episode: "The Nineteenth Hole"
1985	Finder of Lost Loves	Emma Tate	Episode: "Connections"
1985	The A-Team	Karen	Episode: "Lease with an Option to Die"
1986	MacGyver	Karen Blake	Episode: "Deathlock"
1986	Airwolf	Marilyn Kelsy	Episode: "Hawke's Run"
1986	Amazing Stories	Sheena	Episode: "Boo!"
1987	Gung Ho	Kelly	Episode: "Love Me Tender"
1987	Duet	Electra	Episode: "Satin Doll"
1987	My Two Dads	Christine	Episode: "Sex, Judge, and Rock & Roll"
1988	Full House	Vivian	Episode: "Sisterly Love"
1988	Night Court	Diane	Episode: "Harry and the Tramp"
1989	Nearly Departed	Liz Dooley	Main cast (6 episodes)
1989	Dear John	Lisa	Episode: "Sisters"
1990–1991	Good Grief	Debbie Lapidus	Main cast (13 episodes)
1992	Northern Exposure	Tammy Tambo	Episode: "My Mother, My Sister"
1993	Red Shoe Diaries	'Lilac' Boss	Episode: "Hotline"
1994	Runaway Daughters	Mrs. Mildred Cahn	Television film
1995	Murder, She Wrote	Zuleika Brown	Episodes: "Nan's Ghost: Parts 1 & 2"
1995	Hope and Gloria	Nurse Nancy	Episode: "Money You Should Mention"
1995	The John Larroquette Show	Brenda	Episode: "An Odd Cup of Tea"
1997	Friends	Jeannine	Episode: "The One with All the Jealousy" (as 'Wendy Schall')
1997	Star Trek: Voyager	Charlene	Episode: "Real Life"
1997	Fired Up	Susan	Episode: "Are We Not Friends?"
1998	Beyond Belief: Fact or Fiction	Mom	Episode: "The Woods"
2000	The X-Files	Martha Crittendon	Episode: "Chimera"
2001	Boston Public	Mrs. Callie Webb	Episode: "Chapter 15"
2001	The Huntress	Helena Barsamian	Episode: "Undercover"
2001	Six Feet Under	Vicki Dimas	Recurring role (3 episodes)
2002	Providence	Nancy Neiman	Episode: "Limbo"
2002	Boomtown	Darlene Beechem	Episode: "The Freak"
2005–present	American Dad!	Francine Smith (voice)	Main cast
2013; 2017; 2018	Family Guy	Francine Smith (voice); Various	Episodes: "Bigfat", "The Peter Principal", "Con Heiress"
2026	The 'Burbs	Judy	2 episodes

Video Games
Year	Title	Role	Notes
2014	Family Guy: The Quest for Stuff	Francine Smith (voice)	
2022	Warped Kart Racers	Francine Smith (voice)	Archived recordings
