= Convertors =

Line of action figures

- Type: Action figures
- Company: Select
- Country: United States
- Availability: 1984–1984
- Materials: Plastic
- Features: Robot figures

The Convertors were a line of action figures made by Japanese toy company MARK and localized in North America by New York-based company Select in the 1980s.

Often compared to the more famous Gobots and Transformers, the Convertors were a line of toys which came out at about the same time and also featured transforming robots.

== History ==
The Convertors licensed some of their toy designs from Bandai just as was done for the Transformers, meaning some of the toys looked very similar. The molds for Convertors were later knocked off by other toy companies. Convertors toys were featured in a display in the 1985 J. C. Penney Christmas catalog.

== Fiction ==
The Convertors toys featured the conflict between heroic and evil factions, in this case the heroic Defenders (and their Avarian allies) and the evil Maladroids (and their Insectors allies). In the original Japanese the Avarians and Insectors were billed as rival factions Bird Robo vs Zectron (バードロボ対ゼクトロン).

== Toys ==
Various toys were released in different size classes and price points for the Convertors line.

=== Avarians ===
Convertors toys Zark and Rex

- Calypso - parrot
- Feathers - peacock
- Hoot - owl
- Rex - blue robot eagle
- Robat - black robot bat

=== Defenders ===
Standard Defenders

- Chopper - helicopter - licensed from Special Armored Battalion Dorvack
- Fast Track - train engine - licensed from Galactic Whirlwind Sasuraiger
- Tanker - tank - licensed from Special Armored Battalion Dorvack
- Wheels - off road vehicle - licensed from Special Armored Battalion Dorvack

Motorized Defenders

- Argonaut - boat
- Atlantis - boat
- Cpt. Nemo - boat
- Neptune - boat

Super Defenders

- D.A. Tona - white car
- Indy- blue and white car - similar to Chō Kōsoku Galvion
- Monty Carlo - blue car
- X - red car

Jumbo Defenders

- Bull - red bulldozer

Mini-Bots

- City - red Honda City Turbo - licensed from Gokin Robo Car City Robo, similar to the Diaclone Skids toy.
- Sports - silver Toyota Soarer - licensed from Gokin Robo Car Soarer Robo
- Van - black Onebox Nissan Vanette - licensed from Gokin Robo Car Ace Robo, similar to the Diaclone Ironhide toy.
- Wagon - blue Toyota Hilux - licensed from Gokin Robo Car Land Cruiser Robo, similar to the Diaclone Trailbreaker toy.
- Voyager - white van resembling a Plymouth Voyager.

=== Insectors ===
- Crawler - stag beetle - licensed from Beetras Beet-Gadol
- Creeper - longhorn beetle - original toy
- Morphus - locust - licensed from Beetras Beet-Gadol
- Scorpio - scorpion - original toy
- Tenticus - spider - original toy

=== Maladroids ===
Standard Maladroids

- Nofka - licensed from Super Dimension Century Orguss
- SDF-1 - space ship - licensed from Super Dimensional Fortress Macross
- Sunyak - leader of the Maladroids, licensed from Super Dimension Century Orguss
- Zardak - VF-1 jet fighter - licensed from Super Dimensional Fortress Macross
- Zark - VF-1S jet fighter - licensed from Super Dimensional Fortress Macross

Mini-Motorized Maladroids

- Meeshak - grey jet
- Mooriah - white jet
- Turak - blue jet
- Volcan - red jet

=== New Spies ===
These all took the form of objects, rather than vehicles or creatures.

- Selectman - tape deck
- Tilt - pinball machine
- Cash - cash register
- Zoom - binoculars
- Bandit - slot machine
- Vegas - roulette wheel
- Focus - camera

=== On display ===
One of the hotels in Walt Disney World is called Disney's Pop Century Resort, which has different buildings from different decades of the latter half of the 1900s. In the lobby are a series of shadow boxes with memorabilia from each decade. In one from the 1980s are various items including a Convertors Sunyak robot.
