= Nearly Departed =

- Created by: Roger Shulman; John Baskin
- Starring: Eric Idle; Caroline McWilliams; Stuart Pankin; Wendy Schaal; Jay Lambert; Henderson Forsythe
- Composers: Kevin Quinn; Randy Petersen; Robert Irving
- Country of origin: United States
- Original language: English
- No. of seasons: 1
- No. of episodes: 6 (2 unaired)

Production
- Running time: 30 minutes
- Production companies: Baskin-Shulman Productions; Lorimar Television

Original release
- Network: NBC
- Release: April 10 – May 1, 1989

Nearly Departed is an American sitcom that aired on NBC on Monday nights from April 10, 1989, to May 1, 1989. It was an updated version of Topper.

== Premise ==
The series focused on English professor Grant Pritchard and his wife Claire who are killed in a rockslide. They return to their home as ghosts to find plumbing contractor Mike Dooley and his wife Liz, son Derek, and his father, Jack, living there. Grandpa Jack was the only one who could see and hear the Pritchards. In exchange for continuing to live in the house as ghosts, the Pritchards would mediate through Grandpa Jack and try to help the Dooleys with their problems. In one such instance, Derek was doing poorly in school because he was intimidated by bullies; Grant and Claire use their abilities to scare off the bullies.

== Cast ==
- Eric Idle as Grant Pritchard
- Caroline McWilliams as Claire Pritchard
- Stuart Pankin as Mike Dooley
- Wendy Schaal as Liz Dooley
- Jay Lambert as Derek Dooley
- Henderson Forsythe as Grandpa Jack Garrett

== Episodes ==
No.	Title	Directed by	Written by	Original release date	U.S. viewers (millions)	Rating/share (households)
1	"Grant Meets Grandpa"	John Rich	Roger Shulman & John Baskin	April 10, 1989	23.5	15.1/24
2	"Adventures in Babysitting"	John Rich	Roger Shulman & John Baskin	April 17, 1989	19.9	13.2/22
3	"Altared States"	John Rich	Daniel Palladino	April 24, 1989	18.6	12.1/20
4	"TV or Not TV"	John Rich	Neil Alan Levy	May 1, 1989	19.3	11.9/19
5	"Grandpa's Date"	John Rich	Dale McRaven	Unaired	N/A	N/A
6	"Grant's Aunt"	John Rich	Sy Dukane & Denise Moss	Unaired	N/A	N/A
