= Wildfire (1986 TV series) =

- Genre: Adventure; Drama; Fantasy; Sci-fi
- Created by: Jeff Segal; Kelly Ward
- Voices of: John Vernon; Georgi Irene; Jessica Walter; David Ackroyd; Lilly Moon; René Auberjonois; Billy Barty; Susan Blu; Townsend Coleman; Robert Jayne; Rob Paulsen; Frank Welker
- Theme music composer: Jimmy Webb
- Opening theme: "Wildfire"
- Ending theme: "Wildfire" (Instrumental)
- Composer: Hoyt Curtin
- Country of origin: United States
- Original language: English
- No. of seasons: 1
- No. of episodes: 13

Production
- Executive producers: William Hanna; Joseph Barbera
- Producer: Peter Aries Jr.
- Editor: Gil Iverson
- Running time: 24 minutes
- Production company: Hanna-Barbera Productions

Original release
- Network: CBS
- Release: September 13 – December 13, 1986

Wildfire is a 1986 American animated series produced by Hanna-Barbera Productions about the adventures of Sara, a 13-year-old girl growing up in the American West as she discovers her true identity as a princess-in-hiding from another realm who is destined to fight the evil witch Lady Diabolyn. The show was first broadcast on CBS for 13 episodes from September 13 to December 13, 1986.

== Plot ==
As a baby, Princess Sara (voiced by Georgi Irene) of Dar-Shan was saved from the clutches of the evil Lady Diabolyn (voiced by Jessica Walter) by a mystical talking horse named Wildfire (voiced by John Vernon) following the death of Sara's mother Queen Sarana (voiced by Amanda McBroom). Wildfire took her away from the planet Dar-Shan and deposited her in Montana on Earth where she is taken in by a farmer named John Cavanaugh (voiced by David Ackroyd). Lady Diabolyn was the stepsister to Queen Sarana, whom she always considered weak and unfit to rule. To gain her "rightful" throne, she learned dark magic and allied herself with the demonic Spectres.

Thirteen years later when Sara was ready to fight evil, Wildfire started bringing her back to Dar-Shan to regain her kingdom. Wildfire summons Sara through her magic amulet and transports her across dimensions to her real home in Dar-Shan. Sara joins with her friends consisting of a sorcerer named Alvinar (voiced by René Auberjonois), a young boy named Dorin (voiced by Bobby Jacoby), and his colt Brutus (voiced by Susan Blu) in order to thwart her wicked step-aunt. John and Sara's Native American friend Ellen Crow (voiced by Lilly Moon) provide moral support on Earth.

Lady Diabolyn is helped by the Goons, mischievous creatures consisting of Dweedle (voiced by Billy Barty), Nerts, Booper, Mudlusk (voiced by Frank Welker), and Thimble. They were formerly Diabolyn's personal guards until they gained their monstrous appearances by the Spectres upon opening the urn containing them when Diabolyn told them not to.

Each episode revealed more and more of the mythical world of Dar-Shan and gave its audience a new puzzle piece to help reason out the past events that led up to the current state of affairs. It was later revealed that Sara's adoptive father John is actually her biological father Prince Cavan sent to Earth with no memories of his life in Dar-Shan to protect him from the curse which Lady Diabolyn and the Spectres had placed on Dar-Shan. Sara and Wildfire are the only ones who know John's true identity which has been kept secret even from him.

== Episodes ==
No.	Title	Directed by	Written by	Storyboard by	Original release date
1	"Once and Future Queen"	Art Davis	Jeff Segal and Kelly Ward	Ric Estrada	September 13, 1986
Lady Diabolyn captures some butterflies and the Royal Weaver in order to make a dress for her coronation.
2	"A Visit to Wonderland"	Carl Urbano	John Loy	Ric Estrada	September 20, 1986
Dorin and Brutus encounter some children who have been using a wand to immortalize some young horses into carousels.
3	"The Ogre's Bride"	Carl Urbano and Oscar Dufau	Linda Woolverton	Ric Estrada	September 27, 1986
Lady Diabolyn turns a man named Kent into an ogre before his wedding day in order to prevent his wedding to a girl named Cherylla and prevent the unity of two villages.
4	"Secret of Sinti Magic"	Carl Urbano	David Schwartz and John Loy	Ric Estrada	October 4, 1986
While running from Rackteos (half human-half lion beings), Wildfire ends up injuring his leg and he and Sara are saved by the Sintis (the source of all magic on Dar-Shan). Dweedle and his fellow goons discover this and report back to Diabolyn who plans to capture a Sinti.
5	"A Meeting in Time"	Don Lusk	Tony Marino and John Loy	Ric Estrada	October 11, 1986
Sara falls off Wildfire in the portal between Earth and Dar-Shan. This ends up transporting her to Dar-Shan in the past where Queen Sarana will be married to Prince Cavan the same time when Lady Diabolyn became allies with the Spectres.
6	"The Highwayman"	Art Davis	Linda Woolverton	Ric Estrada	October 18, 1986
Sara and Wildfire deal with a highwayman named Aragon and his horse Halavax.
7	"The Pixie Painters"	Art Davis	Jina Bacaar and John Loy	Ric Estrada	October 25, 1986
The pixies have come to Dar-Shan to paint the true queen.
8	"The Name is the Game"	Art Davis	Mark Edens	Ray Aragon	November 1, 1986
When Brutus ends up captured by a troll, Sara and Dorin end up working to decipher the troll's real name while encountering others who failed the troll's challenge and one who passed it. Note: This is the first of three episodes in which John Cavanaugh/Prince Cavan, Lady Diabolyn, the Goons, and the Spectres do not appear. The others are "Strangers In The Night," and "Dragons Of Dar-Shan". Ellen is also absent from the latter two.
9	"Strangers in the Night"	Don Lusk	John Loy	Ric Estrada	November 8, 1986
Wildfire takes Sara to meet with the Great Horse Chieftains and prove that she is Queen Sarana's daughter. When Sara and Dorin unknowingly free an ancient evil called the Goblin Master from beneath the ruins of Castle Thorinia, the entire country is thrown into chaos.
10	"Dragons of Dar-Shan"	Carl Urbano	Mark Edens, Eric Lewald, Jeff Segal and Kelly Ward	Ric Estrada	November 15, 1986
Dorin and Brutus travel to Chimaera, a city that was once threatened by red dragons. When they find a dragon egg in the forest, Sara and Wildfire end up helping Dorin and Brutus into returning the egg to its parents before Chimaera ends up destroyed by the red dragons.
11	"King for a Day"	Rudy Zamora	John Loy	Frank Brunner	November 22, 1986
Lady Diabolyn makes a wish to become Queen of Dar-Shan which almost comes true. The wish ends up activating when a frog looks into the well and is transformed into a King whom Diabolyn plans to manipulate.
12	"Where the Dreams Come From"	Don Lusk	Jeff Segal, Kelly Ward and John Loy	Ric Estrada	December 6, 1986
When a mysterious figure named Mr. Charles Spec appears at the Cavanaugh farm claiming to be Sara's real father, John works with Wildfire to rescue her. Meanwhile, Lady Diabolyn finds that the Spectres are not in their abyss and suspects that they deserted her for their own cause.
13	"Wildfire: King of the Horses"	Don Lusk	John Loy	Ric Estrada	December 13, 1986
Vesta, a high Chieftain of the Sanctuary of Horses, is dying and has chosen Wildfire to be her successor over a horse named Thunderbolt. Though his duty to the sanctuary is strong, this happens to bring conflict to his vow to protect Sara when Diabolyn allies with a centauroid cat creature called Rothadode who is an enemy of the Sanctuary. They plan to capture the horses in his plot to rule the horses and her latest scheme to rule Dar-Shan.

== Voice cast ==
- David Ackroyd as John Cavanaugh / Prince Cavan
- René Auberjonois as Alvinar
- Billy Barty as Dweedle
- Susan Blu as Brutus
- Townsend Coleman as Goon
- Georgi Irene as Princess Sara
- Bobby Jacoby as Dorin
- Lilly Moon as Ellen
- Rob Paulsen as Goon
- John Vernon as Wildfire
- Jessica Walter as Lady Diabolyn
- Frank Welker as Mudlusk

=== Additional voices ===
- Remy Auberjonois
- Victoria Carroll – Mrs. Ashworth
- Louise Chamis – Stubb's Mom (in "Dragons of Dar-Shan")
- Philip Clarke – Lord Samson
- Gino Conforti
- Keene Curtis – Mr. Specs (in "Where the Dreams Come From")
- Jennifer Darling
- Jerry Dexter
- George DiCenzo – Aragon (in "The Highwayman")
- Paul Eiding
- Dick Erdman
- Bernard Erhard – Rothadode (in "Wildfire: King of the Horses")
- Melanie Gaffin
- Dick Gautier
- Barbara Goodson – Nerissa (in "The Name is the Game")
- Scott Grimes
- Noah Hathaway
- Darryl Hickman
- Laura Jacoby
- Lauri Johnson
- Aron Kincaid
- Ron Leibman
- Marilyn Lightstone – Jude (in "Secret of Sinti Magic")
- June Lockhart – Vesta
- Kenneth Mars
- Janet May
- Amanda McBroom – Queen Sarana (in "A Meeting in Time")
- Marissa Mendenhall
- Michael Mish
- Daniel O'Herlihy – Jovar
- Diane Pershing – Lady Aura (in "Strangers in the Night")
- Brock Peters – Thunderbolt (in "Wildfire: King of the Horses")
- Peter Renaday
- Peter Mark Richman
- Bob Ridgely
- Josh Rodine – Stubb (in "Dragons of Dar-Shan")
- Roger Rose – Halavax (in "The Highwayman")
- Neilson Ross
- Will Ryan
- William Schallert
- Brandon Stewart
- Alexandra Stoddart – Sheriel (in "The Ogre's Bride")
- Andre Stojka
- Jeffrey Tambor – Oberon (in "A Visit to Wonderland")
- Les Tremayne – Bildad (in "Dragons of Dar-Shan")
- Ginny Tyler
- Ted Zeigler

== Reception ==
According to the Los Angeles Times, "despite the hackneyed writing and poor animation (the artists don't understand how a horse moves), Wildfire is sure to be a hit with little girls, its obvious audience".
