= Challenge of the GoBots =

- Genre: Science fiction Action
- Based on: GoBots by Tonka and Bandai
- Directed by: Arthur Davis (season 2); Oscar Dufau; Volus Jones (season 2); Don Lusk (season 2); Carl Urbano (season 1); Rudy Zamora (season 2); Alan Zaslove (season 2)
- Starring: Lou Richards; Arthur Burghardt; Frank Welker; Bernard Erhard; Bob Holt; Marilyn Lightstone; Sparky Marcus; Leslie Speights; Morgan Paull; Phil Hartman; B.J. Ward; Brock Peters; Peter Cullen
- Composer: Hoyt Curtin
- Country of origin: United States
- No. of seasons: 1
- No. of episodes: 65

Production
- Executive producers: William Hanna; Joseph Barbera; Joe Taritero; Patrick S. Feely
- Producers: Kay Wright; Lois Hanrahan
- Running time: 21 minutes
- Production companies: Hanna-Barbera Productions; Tonka Corporation; Wang Film Productions (aka Cuckoo's Nest Studios)

Original release
- Network: First-run syndication
- Release: September 8, 1984 – December 13, 1985

Challenge of the GoBots (or GoBots for short) is an American animated series produced by Hanna-Barbera, based on the GoBots toyline released from Tonka. The show was first broadcast in syndication on September 8, 1984, then the show joined the weekday/weekend programming block The Funtastic World of Hanna-Barbera on September 15, 1985. It was later rerun on the USA Cartoon Express.

== Summary ==
GoBots dealt with two opposing forces of transforming robots from the planet GoBotron: the heroic Guardians and the evil Renegades. The Guardians were led by Leader-1 while the Renegades were led by Cy-Kill. The characters rarely had guns, instead shooting energy blasts out of their fists. The female robots on the series, such as Crasher, were built like the males, but with some distinguishing female features. The GoBots' origin as GoBeings accounted for the presence of genders among the robots.

The series generally focused on a small number of robots from each faction (Leader-1, Turbo and Scooter vs. Cy-Kill, Cop-Tur and Crasher) who were virtually ever-present with other characters seeming to rotate in "guest-star" roles. GoBots had no clear division between the two factions. The characters had no identifying insignias or markings to indicate their allegiance, although it was indicated on the toy packaging. Likewise, there was no commonality of design within each faction. The only "theme" to a side was that anything that turned into a "monstrous-looking" robot or vehicle was a Renegade.

== Plot ==
In the series’ backstory, thousands of years ago on planet GoBotron, there lived a race of human-like organic beings called GoBeings. A civil war erupted on the planet when the power-hungry terrorist group known as the Renegades arose; led by a madman dubbed "the Master Renegade", the group waged war against the peaceful Guardians.

When a Renegade sabotage operation inadvertently resulted in a gigantic asteroid colliding with GoBotron, the natural disasters that resulted from the asteroid's impact pushed the GoBeings to the verge of extinction. However, a genius referred as "the Last Engineer" saved his people, taking his experiments to replace parts of his own body with mechanical substitutes to the ultimate extent and placed the brains of the GoBeings in mechanical bodies. Now, they were the "GoBots."

The GoBots possessed an additional ability; after being run through the device named the Modifier, the GoBots’ bodies were able to transform into other vehicles. With his work done, the Last Engineer intended to retreat to a pre-prepared workshop elsewhere in the galaxy, but the Master Renegade stole his ship and escaped in his stead. The Last Engineer placed himself into suspended animation beneath the surface of GoBotron, while up above, the war continued to rage between the Guardians and the Renegades, now all encased in GoBot shells.

In the last quarter of the 20th century, the planet Earth became involved in the conflict between Leader-1's Guardians and Cy-Kill's Renegades. During one of these battles, one of Leader-1's lieutenants, Turbo, became severely damaged. Unwilling to let his friend and teammate die, Leader-1 began his quest to find the legendary Last Engineer. Leader-1 found the person he believed to be the Last Engineer, but Leader-1 had unwittingly released the Master Renegade (though he did repair Turbo to gain the Guardians’ trust).

The Guardians later found the true Last Engineer, who was instrumental in frustrating the alliance between Cy-Kill's Renegades and the Master Renegade. The Master Renegade later escaped the custody of the Renegades, and plagued both factions, notably attacking the UniCom colony of New Earth.

== Episodes ==
1. "Battle for GoBotron, Part I: Battle for GoBotron" (written by Alan Burnett, Jeff Segal, and Tom Ruegger)
2. "Battle for GoBotron, Part II: Target Earth" (written by Alan Burnett, Jeff Segal, and Tom Ruegger)
3. "Battle for GoBotron, Part III: Conquest of Earth" (written by Alan Burnett, Jeff Segal, and Tom Ruegger)
4. "Battle for GoBotron, Part IV: Earth Bound" (written by Alan Burnett, Jeff Segal, and Tom Ruegger)
5. "Battle for GoBotron, Part V: The Final Conflict" (written by Alan Burnett, Jeff Segal, and Tom Ruegger)
6. "The GoBotron Saga, Part 1: Cy-Kill's Escape" (story by Jeff Segal, Kelly Ward, and Peter Anderegg; teleplay by Peter Anderegg)
7. "The GoBotron Saga, Part 2: Quest for the Creator" (story by Peter Anderegg, John Loy, Jeff Segal, and Kelly Ward; teleplay by John Loy)
8. "The GoBotron Saga, Part 3: The Fall of GoBotron" (story by Peter Anderegg, John Loy, Jeff Segal, and Kelly Ward; teleplay by John Loy)
9. "The GoBotron Saga, Part 4: Flight to Earth" (story by Jeff Segal, Kelly Ward, and Peter Anderegg; teleplay by Peter Anderegg)
10. "The GoBotron Saga, Part 5: Return to GoBotron" (story by Peter Anderegg, John Loy, Jeff Segal, and Kelly Ward; teleplay by Peter Anderegg and John Loy)
11. "Time Wars" (story by Jeff Segal and Kelly Ward, teleplay by Douglas Booth)
12. "Cy-Kill's Cataclysmic Trap" (story by Jeff Segal, Kelly Ward, and Peter Anderegg; teleplay by Peter Anderegg)
13. "Nova Beam" (story by Jeff Segal and Kelly Ward, teleplay by Daniel Will-Harris)
14. "Genius and Son" (written by John Loy and Eric Lewald)
15. "It's the Thought that Counts" (written by Mark Zaslove)
16. "Trident's Triple Threat" (story by Jeff Segal and Kelly Ward, teleplay by David Schwartz)
17. "Renegade Alliance" (story by Jeff Segal and Kelly Ward, teleplay by Don Goodman)
18. "Dawn World" (written by Don Glut)
19. "Forced Alliance" (story by Jeff Segal and Kelly Ward, teleplay by Doug Booth)
20. "Invasion from the 21st Level, Part I" (story by Jeff Segal and Kelly Ward, teleplay by Lane Raichert)
21. "Invasion from the 21st Level, Part II" (written by Lane Raichert)
22. "Speed is of the Essence" (story by Jeff Segal and Kelly Ward, teleplay by Jina Bacarr)
23. "Lost on GoBotron" (story by Jeff Segal, Kelly Ward, and Eric Lewald; teleplay by [[Eric Lewald]])
24. "Cy-Kill's Shrinking Ray" (story by Jeff Segal and Kelly Ward, teleplay by Dale Kirby)
25. "Doppleganger" (story by Jeff Segal and Kelly Ward, teleplay by Antoni Zalewski)
26. "The Quest for Roguestar" (story by John Loy, Jeff Segal, and Kelly Ward; teleplay by John Loy)
27. "Renegade Rampage, Part I" (story by Jeff Segal and Kelly Ward, teleplay by Karen Wengrod and Ken Cinnamon)
28. "Renegade Rampage, Part II" (story by Karen Wengrod, Ken Cinnamon, Jeff Segal, and Kelly Ward; teleplay by Karen Wengrod and Ken Cinnamon)
29. "Ultra Zod" (written by Jim Bertges)
30. "Sentinel" (story by Jeff Segal and Kelly Ward, teleplay by Don Glut)
31. "Cold Spell" (written by Alan Burnett)
32. "Crime Wave" (written by Francis Moss)
33. "Auto Madic" (written by Mark Zaslove)
34. "Scooter Enhanced" (story by Jeff Segal, Kelly Ward, and Mark Young; teleplay by Mark Young)
35. "Tarnished Image" (story by Jeff Segal, Kelly Ward, and David Schwartz; teleplay by David Schwartz)
36. "In Search of Ancient Gobonauts" (story by Mark Young, Phil Harnage, Jeff Segal, and Kelly Ward; teleplay by Mark Young)
37. "Gameworld" (story by Jeff Segal and Kelly Ward, teleplay by Michael Charles Hill)
38. "Wolf in the Fold" (story by Michael Reaves, Jeff Segal, and Kelly Ward; teleplay by Michael Reaves)
39. "Depth Charge" (written by John Bates)
40. "Transfer Point" (story by Patrick Barry, Jeff Segal, and Kelly Ward; teleplay by Patrick Barry)
41. "Steamer's Defection" (story by Jeff Segal, Kelly Ward, and Drew Lawrence; teleplay by Drew Lawrence)
42. "The GoBot Who Cried Renegade" (story by Eric Lewald, Jeff Segal, and Kelly Ward; teleplay by Eric Lewald)
43. "The Seer" (written by Eric Lewald and Mark Edens)
44. "Whiz Kid" (written by Alfred Pegal)
45. "Ring of Fire" (story by Michael Humm, Jeff Segal, and Kelly Ward; teleplay by Michael Humm)
46. "Pacific Overtures" (story by Jeff Segal and Kelly Ward, teleplay by Jina Bacarr)
47. "Destroy All Guardians" (written by Don Glut)
48. "Escape from Elba" (written by Lee Yuro and Linda Yuro)
49. "Fitor to the Finish" (story by Don Glut, Jeff Segal, and Kelly Ward; teleplay by Don Glut)
50. "Clutch of Doom" (story by Eric Lewald, Jeff Segal, and Kelly Ward; teleplay by Eric Lewald)
51. "The Third Column" (written by Eric Lewald and Mark Edens)
52. "A New Suit for Leader-1" (written by Reed Robbins and Peter Salas)
53. "Renegade Carnival" (written by Carla Conway)
54. "The Gift" (written by Karen Wilson and Chris Weber)
55. "The Last Magic Man" (written by Mark Young)
56. "Braxis Gone Bonkers" (story by Steve DeKorte, Jeff Segal, and Kelly Ward; teleplay by Mark Zaslove)
57. "Inside Job" (story by Jeff Segal, Kelly Ward, and J. Larry Carroll; teleplay by J. Larry Carroll)
58. "Element of Danger" (written by Gordon Bressack)
59. "The GoBots That Time Forgot" (written by John Loy)
60. "Guardian Academy" (story by Jeff Segal, Kelly Ward, Mark Young, and Lane Raichert; teleplay by Mark Young and Lane Raichert)
61. "Quest for New Earth" (story by Jeff Segal, Kelly Ward, and John Loy; teleplay by John Loy)
62. "Terror in Atlantis" (story by Kelly Ward, Jeff Segal, and Francis Moss; teleplay by Francis Moss)
63. "Et Tu, Cy-Kill" (story by Jeff Segal, Kelly Ward, Eric Lewald, and Mark Edens; teleplay by Eric Lewald and Mark Edens)
64. "The Secret of Halley's Comet" (written by Lane Raichert)
65. "Mission: GoBotron" (story by Eric Lewald, Jeff Segal, and Kelly Ward; teleplay by Eric Lewald)

== Cast ==
Regis Cordic - (Narrator - Mini series and The Gobotron Saga)

- Lou Richards, Jr. - Leader-1
- Arthur Burghardt - Turbo
- Frank Welker - Scooter, Blaster, Rest-Q, Screw Head, Zeemon
- B.J. Ward - Small Foot
- Ken Hudson Campbell - Van Guard
- Kirby Ward - Heat Seeker
- Phil Hartman - Baron Von Joy
- Philip L. Clarke - Dr. Go, Tork
- Peter Cullen - Pincher, Spoiler, Tank
- Paul Eiding - Scorp
- Bernard Erhard - Cy-Kill
- Marilyn Lightstone - Crasher, Path Finder
- Bob Holt - Cop-Tur, Geeper-Creeper
- Kelly Ward - Fitor
- Dick Gautier - Bugsie, Klaws
- Bob Ridgely - BuggyMan
- Sparky Marcus - Nick Burns
- Candy Brown - A.J. Foster (pilot miniseries)
- Leslie Speights - A.J. Foster (regular)
- Morgan Paull - Matt Hunter
- Brock Peters - General Newcastle
- Wayne Mathews - General Lindley
- Gail Matthius - Anya Turgenova
- Rene Auberjonois - Dr. Braxis
- Peter Renaday - Master Renegade

== Home media ==
Various episodes of the show had been released on VHS and Betamax by Vestron Video under its Children's Video Library label in the 1980s.

On May 17, 2011, Warner Archive released Challenge of the GoBots: The Original Miniseries on DVD in Region 1 as part of their Hanna-Barbera Classic Collection. This is a Manufacture-on-Demand (MOD) release, available exclusively through Warner's online store and Amazon.com. On May 6, 2014, Warner Archive released Challenge of the GoBots: The Series, Volume 1 on DVD in Region 1. The three-disc set features the first 30 episodes of the series. The final volume Challenge of the GoBots: The Series, Volume 2, which contains the last remaining 30 episodes of the show, was released on March 10, 2015.

== Adaptations ==
The show spawned an animated, feature-length film GoBots: Battle of the Rock Lords which opened in theaters on March 21, 1986, a little over four months before The Transformers: The Movie (August 8). Clips from the show were also used in Errol Morris’s Fast, Cheap and Out of Control. Additional GoBots storyline was later released on the Transformers Facebook pages "Ask Vector Prime" and "Renegade Rhetoric", with GoBots characters also appearing in a storyline from Fun Publications. Where Renegade Rhetoric serves as a second season to the show in the form of text stories told from Cy-Kill's perspective.

== See also ==
- GoBots: Battle of the Rock Lords (1986)
- List of Transformers animated series
