= Special Armored Battalion Dorvack =

Japanese anime television series

- Promotional artwork

特装機兵ドルバック (Tokusō Kihei Dorubakku)
- Genre: Mecha, military science fiction
- Anime television series
- Directed by: Masami Anno (series director); Jutaro Oba (chief director)
- Written by: Shigemitsu Taguchi
- Studio: Ashi Productions
- Licensed by: NA: Discotek Media
- Original network: FNS (Fuji TV)
- Original run: October 7, 1983 – July 6, 1984
- Episodes: 36
- icon

Special Armored Battalion Dorvack (Japanese: 特装機兵ドルバック, Hepburn: Tokusō Kihei Dorubakku) is a 36 episode anime series aired from 1983 to 1984 in Japan and also aired in Hong Kong at roughly the same time. The show is also known as Special Armored Trooper Dorvack and Powered Armor Dorvack.

== Story ==
The year is 1999. The Idelians, whose colony-ship has been wandering in space for tens of thousands of years, are nearing exhaustion. Their sole hope is to settle on the nearest habitable planet, Earth. Soon after their arrival in orbit, they launch an invasion, landing a large attack force in the Alps.

The Earth Defense Forces valiantly fight in their powered armor against the enemy, but with little success. Only one unit is able to inflict significant damage, the Special Armored Battalion Dorvack. Under the command of Colonel Takagi, Masato Mugen, Pierre Bonaparte and Louie Oberon fight to defeat the invaders. They are equipped with special variable mecha that are able to convert from rugged all-terrain vehicles to humanoid forms.

== Concept ==
The show was essentially a showcase for the toyline released by Takatoku. The mecha designs were created by Katsumi Itabashi and Nobuyoshi Habara, while the models were made by the model company Gunze Sangyo. The plot was kept simple, but filled with high levels of animation and action.

== Staff ==
- Planning, Production: Ashi Productions, Yomiuri
- Director: Masami Anno
- Story editor: Shigemitsu Taguchi
- Original creator: Takeshi Shudo
- Character Design: Osamu Kamijo
- Mecha design: Katsumi Itabashi, Nobuyoshi Habara

== Music ==
- Opening Theme: "Chikyuu Ni I Love You" by WELCOME
- Ending Theme: "Kimi Ni Okuru Lullaby" by WELCOME

== Voice cast ==
Name	Japanese name	Voiced by
Masato Mugen	無限真人	Tōru Furuya
Louie Oberon	ルイ・オベロン	Hiromi Tsuru
Pierre Bonaparte	ピエール・ボナパルト	Sukekiyo Kameyama
Stanley Hilton	スタンレー・ヒルトン	Hirotaka Suzuoki
Col. Yōichi Takagi	高木洋一	Kiyoshi Kobayashi
Bob Floyd	ボブ・フロイド	Yutaka Shimaka
Jackie Frank	ジャッキー・フランク	Asami Mukaidono
Peter	ピーター	Masako Katsuki
Henry	ヘンリー	Yūsaku Yara
Idel	イデル	Show Hayami
Amov	アモフ	Osamu Saka
Aroma	アロマ	Keiko Toda
Zelar	ゼラー	Eiji Kanie

== Merchandise ==
The series featured some solid mechanical designs, but the slow-moving storyline failed to move fans. The line of 1/24, 1/72 and 1/100 scale toys and models sat on Japanese toy store shelves. Toymaker Takatoku Toys, already suffering from the poor performances of the merchandise lines from the previous Super Dimension Century Orguss and Galactic Whirlwind Sasuraiger series, went under as a result.

American toy company Hasbro acquired the molds for two of the deluxe toys, the Mugen Calibur and the Ovelon Gazette. They were re-released in North America as part of the Transformers line as "Deluxe Autobots", under the names "Roadbuster" and "Whirl", respectively. While both Roadbuster and Whirl featured heavily in British-written stories for Marvel UK's Transformers comics (even though, ironically, their toys were never released in the UK) neither character appeared in the American animated series or in U.S. Marvel stories. Due to their fame in the English stories, Dreamwave Productions made use of them in their Transformers comics, produced some 16–17 years later. They also had prominent roles in Transformers (IDW Publishing). Bonaparte Tulcas would later appear in a cameo role in the 'Fun Publication' run, getting the name "Headcannon".

The American firm Select also repackaged two color variations each of the smaller Variable Machine Collection toys under the name "Convertors". Mugen Calibur became "Wheels", Oberon Gazette became "Chopper", and Bonaparte Tulcas became "Tanker".

== Episodes ==
No.	Title	Directed by	Written by	Original release date
1	"1999: A Prelude to War" "1999-nen: Tatakai no Jokyoku" (Japanese: 1999年戦いの序曲)	Directed by : Jutaro Oba; Storyboarded by : Rei Hidaka	Shigemitsu Taguchi	October 7, 1983
2	"General Offensive - Stand By!" "Sōkōgeki: Stand By!" (Japanese: 総攻撃・スタンバイ!)	Directed by : Hiroyuki Yokoyama; Storyboarded by : Hiroshi Yoshida	Shigemitsu Taguchi	October 14, 1983
3	"The Day the Birds Died" "Shima ga Shinda Hi" (Japanese: 鳥が死んだ日)	Directed by : Kazuhiko Ikegami; Storyboarded by : Masayuki Ozeki	Shigemitsu Taguchi	October 21, 1983
4	"Louie Disappears in the Fog!" "Kiri ni Kieta Louie" (Japanese: 霧に消えたルイ)	Directed by : Jutaro Oba; Storyboarded by : Mitsuo Kusakabe	Shigemitsu Taguchi	October 28, 1983
5	"An Unjustified Fall" "Ryū na ki Shikkyaku" (Japanese: 理由なき失脚)	Directed by : Hiroyuki Yokoyama; Storyboarded by : Kozo Takagaki	Shigemitsu Taguchi	November 4, 1983
6	"Jungle Warrior Miranda" "Mitsurin no Senshi Miranda" (Japanese: 密林の戦士ミランダ)	Hiroshi Yoshida	Kenji Terada	November 11, 1983
7	"Run, Jackie!" "Hashire! Jackie" (Japanese: 走れ!ジャッキー)	Mitsuo Kusakabe	Kazumi Koide	November 18, 1983
8	"Infiltrate the Idelian Base" "Sennyū! Idelia Kichi" (Japanese: 潜入!イデリア基地)	Directed by : Kazuhiko Ikegami; Storyboarded by : Saki Noda	Saki Noda	December 2, 1983
9	"The Underground Melody" "Chikadou no Melody" (Japanese: 地下道のメロディー)	Directed by : Jutaro Oba; Storyboarded by : Mitsuo Kusakabe	Shigemitsu Taguchi	December 9, 1983
10	"Bob Takes Aim" "Bob no Muketa Jūkō" (Japanese: ボブの向けた銃口)	Directed by : Hiroyuki Yokoyama; Storyboarded by : Mitsuo Kusakabe	Kenji Terada	December 16, 1983
11	"The Demonic Red Flowers" "Akuma no Akai Hana" (Japanese: 悪魔の赤い花)	Directed by : Hiroshi Yoshida; Storyboarded by : Mitsuo Kusakabe	Kazumi Koide	December 23, 1983
12	"Easter Island in Flames" "Rekka no Easter Shima" (Japanese: 烈火のイースター島)	Directed by : Kazuhiko Ikegami; Storyboarded by : Masayuki Ozeki	Shigemitsu Taguchi	January 13, 1984
13	"The Champ Who Fell to Hell" "Jigoku ni Ochita Champ" (Japanese: 地獄におちたチャンプ)	Hiroyuki Yokoyama	Kenji Terada	January 20, 1984
14	"Let Wild Voices Ring Out!" "Hibike! Yasei no Sakebi" (Japanese: 響け!野性の叫び)	Hiroshi Yoshida	Shigemitsu Taguchi	January 27, 1984
15	"A Love Extinguished by War" "Senka ni Chitta Koi" (Japanese: 戦火に散った恋)	Mitsuo Kusakabe	Kenji Terada	February 3, 1984
16	"A Hidden Warning" "Himerareta Keikoku" (Japanese: 秘められた警告)	Directed by : Kazuhiko Ikegami; Storyboarded by : Masayuki Ozeki	Shigemitsu Taguchi	February 10, 1984
17	"The Mystery of the Rainier Temple" "Rainier Shinden no Nazo" (Japanese: レーニア神殿の謎)	Directed by : Hiroyuki Yokoyama; Storyboarded by : Mitsuo Kusakabe	Kenji Terada	February 17, 1984
18	"The Secrets of Idelia, Revealed" "Abakareta Idelia no Himitsu" (Japanese: あばかれたイデリアの秘密)	Hiroshi Yoshida	Shigemitsu Taguchi	February 24, 1984
19	"Escape from the Alpine Base!" "Dasshutsu! Alps Kyoten" (Japanese: 脱出!アルプスの拠点)	Directed by : Kazuhiko Ikegami; Storyboarded by : Rei Hidaka	Kenji Terada	March 2, 1984
20	"A New Order - Crush the North Sea Fortress" "Kinkyū Shirei! Hokkai no Yōsai wo Tsubuse" (Japanese: 緊急指令!北海の要塞をつぶせ)	Mitsuo Kusakabe	Shigemitsu Taguchi	March 9, 1984
21	"Farewell, Friend! When a Warrior Dies" "Saraba Tomo yo! Senshi ga Shinu Shūnkan" (Japanese: さらば友よ!戦士が死ぬ瞬間)	Hiroshi Yoshida	Kenji Terada	March 16, 1984
22	"When the Moai Shine" "Moai no Hikari-tsu Toki" (Japanese: モアイの光放つ時)	Osamu Kamijo	Shigemitsu Taguchi	March 23, 1984
23	"Earth Dies in 1999" "1999-nen: Chikyū Saigo no Hi" (Japanese: 1999年地球最後の日)	Directed by : Hiroyuki Yokoyama; Storyboarded by : Mitsuo Kusakabe	Shigemitsu Taguchi	April 6, 1984
24	"A Prelude to Darkness" "Ankoku heno Joshō" (Japanese: 暗黒への序章)	Hiroshi Yoshida	Shigemitsu Taguchi	April 13, 1984
25	"Terror! A New Enemy" "Kyōfu! Arata Naru Teki" (Japanese: 恐怖!新たなる敵)	Directed by : Kazuhiko Ikegami; Storyboarded by : Mitsuo Kusakabe	Shigemitsu Taguchi	April 20, 1984
26	"Aroma Alone" "Hitori-bacchi no Aloma" (Japanese: ひとりぼっちのアロマ)	Hiroshi Yoshida	Kenji Terada	April 27, 1984
27	"The Gravestone Holds a Past" "Bohyō ni Kakusareta Kako" (Japanese: 墓標に隠された過去)	Mamoru Hamatsu	Satoshi Namiki	May 4, 1984
28	"Distant Emotions" "Haruka naru Omoi" (Japanese: はるかなる想い)	Directed by : Hiroyuki Yokoyama; Storyboarded by : Mitsuo Kusakabe	Yoshihisa Araki	May 11, 1984
29	"The Valley of Love and Hate" "Ai to Nikushimi no Tani" (Japanese: 愛と憎しみの谷)	Hiroshi Yoshida	Keiji Kubota	May 18, 1984
30	"The Jeanne of the Portrait" "Shōzōga no Jeanne" (Japanese: 肖像画のジャンヌ)	Directed by : Jutaro Oba; Storyboarded by : Rei Hidaka	Kenji Terada	May 25, 1984
31	"Terror! The Shadow in the Flash" "Kyōfu! Senkou ni Ukabu Kage" (Japanese: 恐怖!閃光に浮かぶ影)	Kazuhiko Ikegami	Shigemitsu Taguchi	June 1, 1984
32	"Escape From the Screaming Abyss" "Zekkyō no Fuchi kara no Dasshutsu" (Japanese: 絶叫の淵からの脱出)	Hiroshi Yoshida	Satoshi Namiki	June 8, 1984
33	"The Men Possessed by Devils" "Akuma ni Toritsukareta Otoko-tachi" (Japanese: 悪魔につかれた男達)	Directed by : Jutaro Oba; Storyboarded by : Mitsuo Kusakabe	Yoshihisa Araki	June 15, 1984
34	"Illusions of the Apocalypse" "Shūmatsu heno Illusion" (Japanese: 終末へのイリュージョン)	Hiroyuki Yokoyama	Keiji Kubota	June 22, 1984
35	"Decision! The Final Landfall Operation" "Ketsudan! Saigo no Jōriku Sakusen" (Japanese: 決断!最後の上陸作戦)	Hiroshi Yoshida	Yoshihisa Araki	June 29, 1984
36	"A Miraculous Rebirth" "Fukkatsu heno Kiseki" (Japanese: 復活への奇跡)	Directed by : Jutaro Oba; Storyboarded by : Rei Hidaka	Shigemitsu Taguchi	July 6, 1984
