= Lou Richards (actor) =

American actor (born 1951)

- Born: September 3, 1951 (age 74); Perryton, Texas, U.S.
- Occupation: Actor
- Years active: 1975–present

Lou Richards (born September 3, 1951) is an American actor.

Richards is best known for his appearances on various sitcoms. He played Clark V. Uhley, Jr. in the short-lived All in the Family sitcom spin-off Gloria, as well as Deputy Dennis Putnam in She's the Sheriff.

Among his voice roles are Leader-1 in Challenge of the GoBots, Galtar in Galtar and the Golden Lance, and Flash Gordon in Defenders of the Earth.

== Filmography ==
Film and Television
Year	Title	Role	Notes
1975–1980	Hawaii Five-O	Various characters	7 episodes
1977	Logan's Run	Strong	1 episode: "The Innocent"
1977	Big Hawaii		1 episode: "Sarah"
1978	The Seniors	Steve	Feature film
1978	Project U.F.O.	Lieutenant	1 episode: "Sighting 4023: The I-Man Incident"
1980	Fantasy Island	Duke	1 episode: "The Swinger/Terrors of the Mind"
1980	The Dukes of Hazzard	Virgil Cooper	1 episode: "Return of the Ridge Raiders"
1980	Alice	Disc-Jockey (voice)	1 episode: "Hello Vegas, Goodbye Diner"
1980	Flo	News Anchor	1 episode: "Bull Is Back in Town"
1981	Quincy, M.E.	Subpoena Server	1 episode: "Scream to the Skies"
1981	Diff'rent Strokes	Mike	1 episode: "The Older Man"
1981	The Munsters' Revenge	Boyfriend	TV movie
1981	CHiPs	Van Driver	1 episode: "Ponch's Angels: Part 1"
1981	Enos	Virgil Cooper	1 episode: "Now You See Him, Now You Don't"
1981	Laverne & Shirley in the Army	Outlaw (voice)	1 episode: "Invasion of the Booby Hatchers"
1981	Private Benjamin	Helicopter Pilot	1 episode: "Judy in the Driver's Seat"
1981	WKRP in Cincinnati	Officer Madigan	2 episodes: "An Explosive Affair" (Parts 1 & 2)
1981	The Facts of Life	Mike Palmer	1 episode: "Cousin Geri Returns"
1982	Archie Bunker's Place	Jim	1 episode: "The Night Visitor"
1982	Alice	Customer	1 episode: "Sharples vs. Sharples"
1982	Cass Malloy	Deputy Dennis Little	TV pilot episode for She's the Sheriff
1982–1983	Gloria	Clark V. Uhley, Jr.	Main cast (21 episodes)
1983	The Love Boat	Félix Sheppard	1 episode: "The End Is Near"
1984	Second Edition	Rick Williams	TV movie
1984–1985	Challenge of the GoBots	Leader-1 (voice)	63 episodes
1984	Too Close for Comfort	Jordan Franklin	1 episode: "Henry Bites the Big Apple"
1985	St. Elsewhere	William Craig	1 episode: "Saving Face"
1985	Galtar and the Golden Lance	Galtar (voice)	21 episodes
1986	The Love Boat	Andrew Proctor	1 episode: "Father of the Bride/The Best Man/Members of the Wedding"
1986	Hardcastle and McCormick	Freddie 'Bummer' Bumgarner	1 episode: "Poker Night"
1986	Hunter	Dr. David Anderson	1 episode: "Death Machine"
1986	GoBots: Battle of the Rock Lords	Leader-1 (voice)	Animated feature film
1986	Growing Pains	Braxton Hicks	1 episode: "Jason's Rib"
1986–1987	Defenders of the Earth	Flash Gordon (voice)	30 episodes
1987	Highway to Heaven	Voice	1 episode: "A Mother and a Daughter"
1987–1989	She's the Sheriff	Dep. Dennis Putnam	Main cast (45 episodes)
1989–1990	Just the Ten of Us	Father Bud	Recurring role (5 episodes)
1990	Major Dad	Reg Feiffer	1 episode: "See the Bridge"
1990	Uncle Buck	Jack	1 episode: "Nine-to-Five"
1990	Growing Pains	Modesto	1 episode: "Roommates"
1991	Going Under	Skiff	Feature film
1992–1993	Reasonable Doubts	Robert Ellis	Recurring role (3 episodes)
1993	Home Free	Lawyer	1 episode: "Front Page"
1995	The Mommies	Maitre'D	1 episode: "The Dating Pool"
1995	Live Shot	Harvey Shempard	1 episode: "What Price Episode?"
1996	Night Eyes 4: Fatal Passion		Feature film
1996	Dave's World		1 episode: "Fame"
1996	Soul of the Game	Baseball Announcer	TV movie
1996	Sherman Oaks	Larry Sinatra	1 episode: "X-Rated Neighbors"
1997	Arsenio	Stewart	1 episode: "Secrets and Lies"
1997	Breaking the Surface: The Greg Louganis Story	Sports Announcer (voice)	TV movie
1998	Kelly Kelly	Football Announcer (voice)	1 episode: "The Wedding Show"
1998	Living Out Loud	Judith's Lawyer	Feature film
1998	Oh Baby	Football Announcer (voice)	1 episode: "False Alarm"
1999	Clueless	The Chauffeur	1 episode: "Child Bride"
1999	Beyond Belief: Fact or Fiction	Realtor	1 episode: "The Curse of Hampton Manor"
1999–2000	The Amanda Show	Father	Recurring role (2 episodes)
2000	Resurrection Blvd.	Reporter #1	1 episode: "Pilot: Part 1"
2000	Providence	Doctor	2 episodes: "The Thanksgiving Story" (Parts 1 & 2)
2001	JAG	Captain Costain	1 episode: "Liberty"
2001	Dischord	Radio DJ (voice)	Feature film
2001	The Practice	A.D.A. Tom Connolly	1 episode: "Killing Time"
2001	Maybe It's Me	Doctor	1 episode: "The Hair Episode"
2001	The X-Files	Officer Custer	1 episode: "Dæmonicus"
2002	Presidio Med	Detective	1 episode: "Second Chance"
2002	Without a Trace	Arlin Tompkins	1 episode: "Silent Partner"
2002	CSI: Miami	Lawyer	1 episode: "Breathless"
2002	Flashpoint	Lawyer	TV pilot episode (aka M.E.D.S.: Mobile Epidemic Defense Squad)
2003	Hulk	Pediatrician	Feature film
2003	Joan of Arcadia	Brianna's Dad	1 episode: "Bringeth It On"
2004	Charmed	Male Lawyer	1 episode: "Hyde School Reunion"
2004	My Wife and Kids	Sports Announcer (voice)	Recurring role (2 episodes)
2004	Summerland	Mr. Borden	Recurring role (2 episodes)
2004	ER	Dr. Perkins	1 episode: "Time of Death"
2005	Passions	Radio Announcer (voice)	1 episode: "Episode dated October 20, 2005"
2005	NBA '06	Coach T (voice)	Video game
2005	Bones	Dr. Barragan	1 episode: "The Girl in the Fridge"
2005	Sleeper Cell	LAPD Detective	1 episode: "Immigrant"
2005	Stroker and Hoop	TJ the DJ / Used Car Salesman (voice)	Recurring role (2 episodes)
2006	Beyond	Bill Mickleson	TV pilot episode
2006	24	Businessman	1 episode: "Day 5: 9:00 a.m.-10:00 a.m."
2006	Windfall	Judge	1 episode: "Pilot"
2007	NBA '08 Featuring the Life: Vol 3	Coach T (voice)	Video game
2008	NBA '09: The Inside	Coach T (voice)	Video game
2009	N.C.B.S.	Veteran in therapy	Short film
2009	Get the Girl	O'Malley	Feature film
2009	Lie to Me	Robert Bradin	1 episode: "The Best Policy"
2009	Here's Herbie	Subway Passenger	Short film
2009	The Forgotten	Mr. Simmons	1 episode: "Pilot"
2009	What We Became	John Franklin	Short film
2010	Growth	Dr. Macavire	Feature film
2010	Hi Fly	Steve	Short film (also producer)
2010	Class	Mr. Pennington	TV movie
2011	Los Americans	Hanley Thompson	1 episode: "Going to Mexico"
2011	Eagleheart	Councilman Wilcox	1 episode: "Double Your Displeasure"
2011	Weeds	Onscreen Video Narrator	1 episode: "From Trauma Cometh Something"
2011	The Closer	Gerald Wein	1 episode: "Repeat Offender"
2011	Desperate Housewives	Night Manager	1 episode: "Putting It Together"
2012	Mad Men	Charles Butler Jr.	Recurring role (2 episodes)
2012	Criminal Minds	Ben Hughes	1 episode: "God Complex"
2012	Ben and Kate	Golfer #2	1 episode: "Guitar Face"
2013	Lovelace	Senator Specter	Feature film
2013	1600 Penn	Cabinet Secretary #1	1 episode: "Skip the Tour"
2013	Shake It Up	Health Inspector	1 episode: "Forward and Back It Up"
2013	Grey's Anatomy	Steven Basche	1 episode: "She's Killing Me"
2014	Intelligence	CEO Shepperton	1 episode: "Cain and Gabriel"
2014	NCIS	Minister	1 episode: "Honor Thy Father"
2015	How to Get Away with Murder	Father Bernard	1 episode: "The Night Lila Died"
2015	Murder of Crowe	Eugene Glenn	Short film
2016	The Infamous	IA Bureaucrat	TV movie
2016	A.L.L.I.A.N.C.E.	Jared Cain	
2016	Displacement	Charles Sinclair	Feature film
