= Galtar and the Golden Lance =

American animated television series

- Galtar and Tormack
- Genre: Animation; Sword and planet; Adventure; Action; Drama
- Written by: Neal Barbera
- Directed by: Oscar Dufau; Arthur Davis; Alan Zaslove; Don Lusk; Tony Love
- Voices of: Barry Dennen; Bob Frank; Mary McDonald-Lewis; David Mendenhall; Brock Peters; Lou Richards; Frank Welker
- Opening theme: "Galtar"
- Ending theme: "Galtar" (instrumental)
- Composer: Hoyt Curtin
- Country of origin: United States
- Original language: English
- No. of episodes: 21

Production
- Executive producers: William Hanna; Joseph Barbera
- Producer: Bob Dranko
- Running time: 30 minutes
- Production company: Hanna-Barbera Productions

Original release
- Network: Syndicated
- Release: September 2, 1985 – January 20, 1986

Galtar and the Golden Lance is a 30-minute American animated sword and planet television series produced by Hanna-Barbera Productions. It aired in syndication in 1985–86 as part of The Funtastic World of Hanna-Barbera. The show comprised 21 episodes and is thought to have been created in response to the rising popularity of the He-Man franchise.

== Premise ==
The series is about the mythical sword-and-planet adventures of three companions: Galtar, Princess Goleeta, and her younger mind controlling brother Zorn. Galtar, with the help of his Golden Lance, fights with Tormack, the tyrannical usurper of the kingdom of Bandisar, who is conquering their entire world. Tormack is responsible for the death of both Galtar's parents and assassinating the rest of Goleeta and Zorn's family.

Tormack covets the power of the Golden Lance, wishing to combine it with the Sacred Shield, which rightfully belongs to Goleeta and Zorn. Whoever holds both becomes invincible. The Golden Lance normally exists as a short staff; but when Galtar holds it above his head with both hands, two mystical blades extend from it, one on each side, and can then be divided into two swords for dueling. The enchantment that empowers the Golden Lance also protects it by releasing energy from its hilt (called the "Fury of the Golden Lance") when held by an unworthy wielder.

The series was cancelled before the revelation of the final outcome of the conflict between Galtar and Tormack.

== Characters ==
- Galtar is the main character of the series and wielder of the Golden Lance.
- Princess Goleeta is the princess of Bandisar.
- Zorn is the younger, mind-controlling brother of Princess Goleeta.
- Thork is Galtar's loyal horse.
- Tormack is the primary villain of the series.
- Rak and Tuk are a father and son dwarf duo who are inept mercenaries and have a tendency to double-cross others on both sides, even each other. They claimed that it was the only work that they know.

=== Supporting Characters ===
- Ither is the keeper of the Golden Lance, who eventually puts it into Galtar's cave.
- Krimm is Tormack's wizardly aide-de-camp.
- Marin is a feral child who rescues and befriends Zorn.
- Pandat is the prince of a race called Nerms, who occasionally aid the heroes.
- Rava is Tormak's niece who allies herself with Galtar and Goleeta. She wore a magical gauntlet that could command fire and ice through the gemstones embedded in it. The gauntlet also had a black gemstone that could be used to summon Raven's Claw. Rava later gave this gauntlet to Goleeta.
- Raven's Claw is a fierce and powerful red dragon who comes to the aid of Galtar and Goleeta during the first episode of the series. Rava later gives Goleeta her magical gauntlet so she can summon Raven's Claw at will.
- Vikor is the leader of the raiders who also seeks the Golden Lance.

== Episode list ==
No.	Title	Written by	Original release date
1	"Galtar and the Princess"	Neal Barbera	September 2, 1985
Galtar and Princess Goleeta begin their quest to find the Golden Lance and the Sacred Shield that is needed to defeat the despot Tormack.
2	"Skull Forest"	Neal Barbera	September 9, 1985
Prince Pandat of the Nerms saves Galtar and Princess Goleeta from Rak's trap. He brings them to Pandat as Tormack begins his attack.
3	"Mursa the Merciless"	Mark Young	September 16, 1985
The evil witch Mursa traps Princess Goleeta and steals her youth. Galtar works with the mysterious White Knight to rescue Princess Goleeta and defeat Mursa.
4	"Goleeta's Reunion"	Mark Seidenberg	September 23, 1985
Princess Goleeta's brother Zorn is captured and forced to work in Tormack's mines as Rak and Tuk lead her into a trap where she gets captured by Tormack.
5	"Shadowhaunt"	Dennis Marks	September 30, 1985
Galtar, Princess Goleeta, and Zorn enter Shadowhaunt, where they are attacked by an invisible monster.
6	"Tormack's Trap"	Dennis Marks	October 7, 1985
Galtar saves a young woman named Rava who helps Galtar, Princess Goleeta, and Zorn get into Tormack's castle. What they don't know is that Rava is Tormack's niece.
7	"Wicked Alliance"	Mark Young	October 14, 1985
Krimm teams up with Mursa in a plot to defeat Galtar and get their hands on the Golden Lance.
8	"Vikor's Raiders"	Mark Seidenberg	October 21, 1985
The Raiders led by Vikor kidnap Tuk and managed to steal the Golden Lance. Rak persuades Galtar to let him help out so that he can save his son.
9	"The Manta Marauders"	Dennis Marks	October 28, 1985
A mysterious ship steals some treasure and accidentally kidnaps Goleeta before disappearing through a vortex. Galtar must go to an unknown world to save her.
10	"The Master Fighters"	Dennis O’Flaherty	November 4, 1985
In another attempt to defeat Galtar, Krimm creates three warriors, the Master Fighters. Galtar must defeat them to save the kidnapped Goleeta.
11	"The Maze of Magus"	Mark Seidenberg	November 11, 1985
The Magus, an avid hunter, traps Galtar and his companions in a maze. Galtar must defeat Magus and find a way out of his maze to escape.
12	"Falca - Priestess of Prey"	Mark Young	November 18, 1985
Galtar and Goleeta are kidnapped by an evil bird woman, Falca. It is up to Zorn to inspire a bird man to rise up and save his people and Galtar.
13	"The Silver Sword"	Evelyn A. R. Gabai	November 25, 1985
Tormack creates the invincible "Silver Sword". With help from a friend from the past, Galtar must find the courage to face Tormack even if it will mean his defeat.
14	"Zorn Meets Marin"	Neal Barbera	December 2, 1985
When Zorn is swept down river, he befriends the young wildling Marin.
15	"Vikor's Revenge"	Mark Seidenberg	December 9, 1985
Vikor returns to seek revenge on Galtar. With the help of a new ally, Galtar must save a kidnapped Goleeta and Zorn.
16	"Galtar's Challenge"	Mark Young	December 16, 1985
Closing in on Bandisar, Galtar sends a challenge to fight Tormack, but instead of facing Galtar himself, Tormack chooses a monstrous beast to fight.
17	"Ither's Apprentice"	Mark Seidenberg	December 23, 1985
Ither takes on a new apprentice, but Zorn suspects this new apprentice may be more than he seems.
18	"Antara the Terrible"	Alan Burnett	December 30, 1985
A sorceress named Antara promises to overthrow Tormack if Galtar will help her find a magical stone.
19	"Tormack's Treachery"	Mark Young	January 6, 1986
In a plot to trap Galtar, Tormack and the heroes are taken prisoner by a deadly snow demon.
20	"Love of Evil"	Dennis Marks	January 13, 1986
Galtar and friends must rescue Rava from marriage to a slug-like creature.
21	"The Return of Rava"	Dennis Marks	January 20, 1986
Tormack's niece tries to steal the kingdom for herself.

== Main voice cast ==
- Lou Richards – Galtar
- Mary McDonald-Lewis – Princess Goleeta
- Bob Frank – Rak
- David Mendenhall – Zorn
- Brock Peters – Tormack
- Frank Welker – Koda, Thork, Tuk

=== Additional voices ===
- Bob Arbogast – Ither
- Michael Bell – Yogoth (in "Love of Evil")
- Gregg Berger
- Corey Burton
- Greg Callahan
- William Callaway
- Henry Corden
- Regis Cordic
- Peter Cullen
- Jennifer Darling
- Barry Dennen – Krimm (in "Wicked Alliance")
- George DiCenzo – Otar
- Walker Edmiston
- Richard Erdman
- Pat Fraley
- Linda Gary
- Dick Gautier
- Bob Holt
- Helen Hunt – Rava (in "Tormack's Trap", "The Return of Rava", and "Love of Evil")
- Chuck McCann – Orlock
- Allan Melvin
- Don Messick – Pandat
- Robert Ridgely
- William Schallert
- Diane Shalet
- Ted Zeigler

== Other media ==
Galtar made a non-speaking cameo in the Harvey Birdman, Attorney at Law episode "SPF". Harvey calls him and his Golden Lance to the stand in a case involving cybersquatting.

== Home media ==
Warner Archive released Galtar and the Golden Lance: The Complete Series on DVD in region 1 on November 10, 2015 as part of their Hanna–Barbera Classics Collection. This is a Manufacture-on-Demand (MOD) release, available exclusively through Warner's online store and Amazon.com.
