= Gary Imhoff =

American actor (born 1952)

- Occupation: Actor
- Years active: 1972–present

Gary Imhoff is an American actor. He was a teacher at Milton Katselas' Beverly Hills Playhouse. Imhoff teaches The Professional Artists Workshop and The Musical Artists Workshop at The Whitmore-Lindley Theatre in North Hollywood, California. Imhoff is probably best known for playing Curtis Estabrook on the TV series Falcon Crest and for providing the voice of Prince Cornelius in the Don Bluth film Thumbelina and Harry Osborn in the 1994 Spider-Man animated TV series.

== Personal life ==
Imhoff is a Scientologist.

== Television ==
- Another Day (1978) - Peter Sloane (2 episodes)
- The Runaways a.k.a. Operation Runaway (1978) - Danny (1 episode)
- How The West Was Won (1979) - Lt. Barker (1 episode)
- Taxi (1979) - Richard (1 episode)
- Barney Miller (1979) - Joseph Hutton (1 episode)
- The Waltons (1980) - Roland Piper (1 episode)
- Eight Is Enough (1978–1981) - Dennis/Marshall Spector/Lance Ham/Henry (5 episodes)
- The Powers of Matthew Star (1983) - Gary Wymore (1 episode) (episode "Quadrian Caper")
- Defenders of the Earth (voice) (1986) - Ajuna (1 episode)
- Throb (1987) - Quentin (1 episode)
- What a Country (1987) - Vladimir Kirov (1 episode)
- Falcon Crest (1987–1988) - Curtis Estabrook (8 episodes)
- Timon And Pumbaa (voice) (1995) - Singing Frogs (1 episode)
- Life... and Stuff a.k.a. Life & Stuff (1997) - Maurice (1 episode)
- Spider-Man (voice) (1995–1998) - Harry Osborn/Green Goblin II (23 episodes)
- Beyond Belief: Fact or Fiction (1997–1998) - The Technician (2 episodes)
- Buffy the Vampire Slayer (1998) - Teacher (1 episode)
- L.A. Heat (1999) - (Uncredited Role) (1 episode)
- Monk (2003) - Umpire (1 episode)
- Carnivàle (2003) - Male Performer (1 episode)
- The Suite Life of Zack & Cody (2007) - Dr. Fred Zippinpickle (1 episode) (episode "Tiptonline")

== Filmography ==
- The Seniors (1978) - Ben
- Zuma Beach (1978) - Frank
- Lucy Moves to NBC (1980) - Fred Silverman
- The Nude Bomb (1980) - Jerry Krovney
- It Came Upon the Midnight Clear (1984) - Freddie
- Summer School (1987) - Student
- Thumbelina (1994) - Prince Cornelius (voice)
- Spider-Man: Sins of the Fathers (1996) - The Green Goblin II (Harry Osborne) (voice)
- Rage (1996) - McKinna
- Skyscraper (1996) - Dudley
- Angel in Training (1999) - Cameron
- The Green Mile (1999) - Husband At Del's Execution
- The Date (2002/1) - George Hackett
- The Wager (2004) - Babayama
- Blood Brothers: Reign of Terror (2007) - SWAT Team
- Queen of the Lot (2010) - DB Client #8 (uncredited)
- The M Word (2014) - Lloyd Duff - TV Director
