= The Seniors =

1978 film by Rod Amateau

- Directed by: Rod Amateau
- Screenplay by: Stanley Shapiro
- Produced by: Stanley Shapiro; Carter DeHaven
- Starring: Jeffrey Byron; Gary Imhoff; Dennis Quaid; Lou Richards; Edward Andrews; Ian Wolfe; Robert Emhardt; Alan Hewitt; Lynn Cartwright; Woodrow Parfrey; Troy Hoskins; David Haney; Alan Reed; Priscilla Barnes; Rocky Flintermann
- Cinematography: Robert Jessup
- Edited by: Guy Scarpitta
- Music by: Patrick Williams
- Production company: Senior Pictures Inc.
- Distributed by: Cinema Shares International Distribution
- Release date: 30 June 1978
- Running time: 87 minutes
- Country: United States
- Language: English

The Seniors (sometimes The Senior or simply Seniors) is a 1978 American comedy film about four college seniors who open a bogus sex clinic, which unexpectedly mushrooms into a multimillion-dollar business. Directed by Rod Amateau, the films features Dennis Quaid in one of his earliest roles and Alan Reed (the original voice of Fred Flintstone) in his final film appearance.

== Plot ==
The film opens with a title card that jokingly claims that Paul Newman, Robert Redford, Steve McQueen, Al Pacino, Burt Reynolds, Ryan O'Neal, Robert De Niro, Clint Eastwood, and Charles Bronson are the stars of the film. This is followed by a cartoon professor delivering the line "ooh all these big stars, not one of them is in the picture."

Ben (Gary Imhoff), Larry (Jeffrey Byron), Alan (Dennis Quaid) and Steve (Lou Richards) are college seniors who are terrified at the prospect of working for a living. They create a plan to support themselves as graduate research students by getting a foundation grant to study sexuality in college-age women. Gradually, the experiment turns into a profitable business that makes the millionaires.

== Cast ==
- Jeffrey Byron as Larry Bronson
- Gary Imhoff as Ben Adler
- Dennis Quaid as Alan Darby
- Lou Richards as Steve Elliott
- Rocky Flintermann as Arnold Frobisher
- Priscilla Barnes as Sylvia
- Alan Reed as Professor Sigmund Heigner
- Edward Andrews as Banker
- Ian Wolfe as Mr. Bleiffer
- Alan Hewitt as Inspector
- Robert Emhardt as Bishop
- Lynn Cartwright as Elizabeth Creighton
- Woodrow Parfrey as Attorney
- Troy Hoskins as Judge
- David Haney as Officer Ruben

The Seniors was the final film of Alan Hewitt, who portrayed the Inspector, before his retirement in 1978 and death in 1986, whereas Alan Reed (in his own final film role) posthumously starred in that film a year after his death in 1977.

== Release ==
The film was released in 1978 with an MPAA rating of R.
