= Arthur Burghardt =

American actor

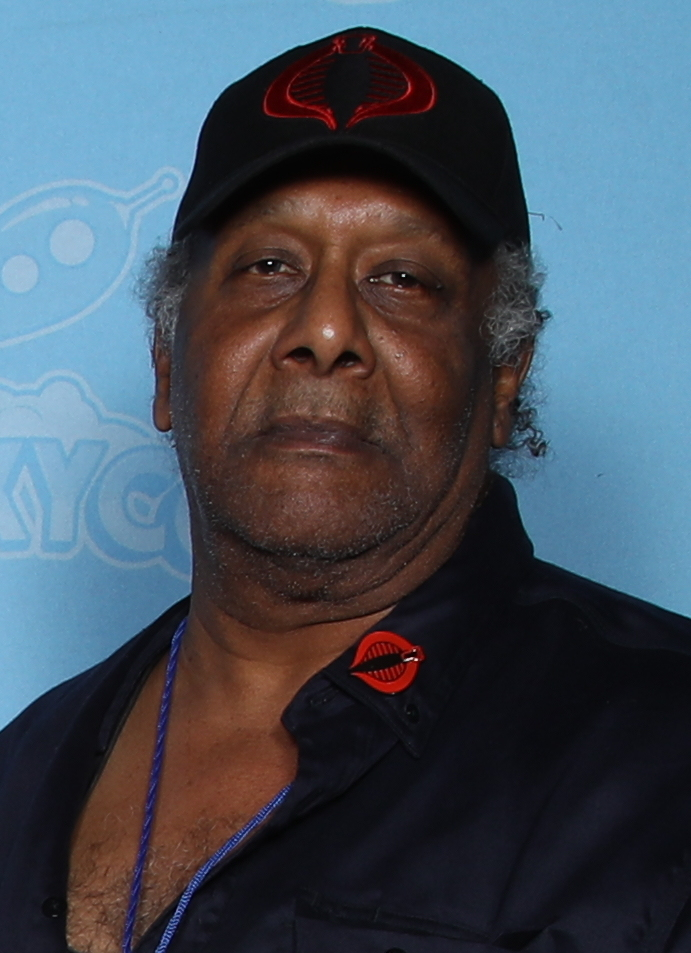
- Burghardt at the 2019 GalaxyCon Raleigh
- Born: Arthur Napier Burghardt; New York City, U.S.
- Occupation: Actor
- Years active: 1973–2010
- Agent: TGMD Talent Agency

Arthur Napier Burghardt is an American retired actor, best known for portraying Jack Scott on the soap opera One Life to Live. In animation, he is known for lending his deep bass voice as Devastator in The Transformers; Destro, Stalker and Iceberg in G.I. Joe; and Pete (as the character's first and so far only Black performer) in several Disney video games.

== Career ==
His first movie appearance was as the Great Ahmed Kahn in Network (1976). Notable voice roles include Destro in the animated series G.I. Joe and Devastator on The Transformers. He also lent his voice to Venom in Ultimate Spider-Man. and Turbo in Challenge of the Gobots. Burghardt appeared in the first episode of the daytime soap opera Santa Barbara in 1984. He also appeared in the series premiere of the short-lived 1991 sitcom Good Sports with Ryan O'Neal and Farrah Fawcett. In 1997, he was the voice of "Cy" in the family science fiction movie Star Kid and portrayed Laurant in the 2001 TV series Los Luchadores.

Burghardt played a commando in the early 1990s video game Night Trap. In Warcraft III: Reign of Chaos, he voiced Mannoroth and Grom Hellscream in 2002, and later in World of Warcraft: Cataclysm, he reprised his role as Mannoroth. In 2010, he voiced Thanatos in the video game God of War: Ghost of Sparta and afterwards retired that year.

The fictional Arthur Burghardt Expressway in the 8th season Seinfeld episode, "The Pothole", is named after Burghardt.

In 2016, Burghardt joined the convention circuit with his representative CelebWorx. He appeared at Long Beach Comic Con.

== Filmography ==
=== Film ===
Year	Title	Role	Notes
1976	Network	Great Ahmed Kahn	
1985	Robotix	Argus, Steth	Direct-to-video
1985	Bigfoot and the Muscle Machines	Professor D. (voice)	Uncredited
1985	Playing with Fire	Harry	
1986	GoBots: Battle of the Rock Lords	Turbo, Cop-Tur, Talc (voices)	
1986	The Transformers: The Movie	Devastator (voice)	
1987	G.I. Joe: The Movie	Destro, Iceberg (voices)	Direct-to-video
1990	The Prince and the Pauper	Pete (voice)	Featurette
1991	A Rage in Harlem	Bo	
1994	The Favor	Hotel Clerk	
1994	Cosmic Slop	Justin Jasper	Television film Segment: "Space Traders"
1997	Star Kid	Cyborsuit (voice)	
1998	Denial	Stuffy Man	
2000	Killjoy	Homeless Man	Direct-to-video; Last film role

=== Television ===
Year	Title	Role	Notes
1978–1980	One Life to Live	Dr. Jack Scott	
1979	Scooby-Doo and Scrappy-Doo	Additional voices	
1980	Diff'rent Strokes	Mr. DuPrey	Episode: "First Love"
1983–1986	G.I. Joe: A Real American Hero	Destro, Stalker, Iceberg (voices)	Recurring role
1982–1984	Knots Landing	Louis Bonfort, D.A., Dr. Rosen	4 episodes
1983	Hardcastle and McCormick	Lt. Stanton	2 episodes
1983	Super Friends	Head of Volti (voice)	Episode: "Day of the Dinosaurs"
1983	Alvin and the Chipmunks	Additional voices	13 episodes
1984	Santa Barbara	TV Reporter	1 episode
1984	Partners in Crime	Leon DeRoy	Episode: "Celebrity"
1984	Cover Up	Boris Culver	Episode: "Harper-Gate"
1984	Super Friends: The Legendary Super Powers Show	General Plankton, additional voices	8 episodes
1984	Saturday Supercade	Borf, Mr. Friendly (voices)	
1984	Dragon's Lair	Cinge (voice)	Episode: "Tale of the Enchanted Gift"
1984	Challenge of the GoBots	Turbo, Cop-Tur (voices)	9 episodes
1984–1986	The Transformers	Devastator (voice)	9 episodes
1985	Hill Street Blues	Maddy	Episode: "Intestinal Fortitude"
1985	The Jeffersons	Mr. Harris	Episode: "Last Dance"
1985	Robotix	Argus, Steth (voices)	Episode: "Battle of the Titans"
1985	Sectaurs	Spidrax, Spiderflyer (voices)	5 episodes
1986	The Fall Guy	Tony Maguire	Episode: "The Lucky Stiff"
1986	Pound Puppies	Dr. Black, Newsreporter (voices)	2 episodes
1986	Foofur	Additional voices	3 episodes
1987–1989	227	Walter Gipson, Krieger	2 episodes
1987	Starman	Les Martin	Episode: "The System"
1987	Bionic Six	Edward Tully	Episode: "The Hive"
1987	Saber Rider and the Star Sheriffs	Commander (voice)	Episode: "Star Sheriff Round Up"
1987	The Real Ghostbusters	The Undying One, Ambassador Yali (voices)	Episode: "Moaning Stones"
1988	Frank's Place	Coach Richards	Episode: "The Recruiting Game"
1989	The Robert Guillaume Show	Dr. Hug	Episode: "Fast Friends"
1990–1992	Tom & Jerry Kids	Additional voices	2 episodes
1991	Good Sports	Stu Ramsey	Episode: "Pros and Ex-Cons"
1992	Fievel's American Tails	Hambone (voice)	Episode: "The Gift"
1992	Conan the Adventurer (1992)	Ram Amon (voice)	Multiple Episodes
1995	Aaahh!!! Real Monsters	Elban Bigfoot (voice)	Episode: "Bigfoot, Don't Fail Me Now"
1995	Live Shot		Episode: "Shake, Rattle, and Roll"
1996	Bone Chillers	Principal Pussman	Recurring role; 9 episodes
1997–1998	Conan the Adventurer (1997)	The Skull That Talks (voice)	22 episodes
1998–2000	The Wild Thornberrys	Big Buffalo, Rhino (voices)	2 episodes
2001	Los Luchadores	Laurant	Recurring role; 16 episodes
2001	As Told by Ginger	Santa Claus #2 (voice)	Episode: "The Even Steven Holiday Special"
2002	What's New, Scooby-Doo?	Roller Ghoster (voice)	Episode: "Roller Ghoster Ride"
2006	Super Robot Monkey Team Hyperforce Go!	Commodore Game Master (voice)	2 episodes

=== Video games ===
Year	Title	Role	Notes
1992	Night Trap	Commando	
1995	Stonekeep	Khull-Khuum the Shadowking	
1996	Star Wars: X-Wing vs. TIE Fighter	Imperial Officer #5	
1999	Baldur's Gate: Tales of the Sword Coast	Narrator, Demonknight	
2000	Freedom: First Resistance	Zared, Oq, Poter PK	
2002	Warcraft III: Reign of Chaos	Mannoroth, Grom Hellscream	Uncredited
2002	Monsters, Inc. Scream Arena	Schmidt	
2002	Disney Golf	Pete	
2002	Treasure Planet: Battle at Procyon	Aquanog Crew, Aquanog Mayor, Admiral	
2002	Disney Sports Soccer	Pete	
2002	Disney Sports Skateboarding	Pete	
2002	Disney Sports Football	Pete	
2003	Disney Sports Basketball	Pete	
2003	Disney's Party	Pete	
2004	The Chronicles of Riddick: Escape from Butcher Bay	Booger, Haamid, Thunder	
2004	World of Warcraft	Mannoroth	
2005	Predator: Concrete Jungle	Additional voices	
2005	Ultimate Spider-Man	Venom	
2007	World of Warcraft: The Burning Crusade	Grommash Hellscream, Mannoroth	
2009	The Chronicles of Riddick: Assault on Dark Athena	Booger, Haamid, Thunder	
2010	God of War: Ghost of Sparta	Thanatos	
2010	World of Warcraft: Cataclysm	Mannoroth	
