= CB4 =

1993 film directed by Tamra Davis

- Theatrical release poster
- Directed by: Tamra Davis
- Screenplay by: Chris Rock; Nelson George; Robert LoCash
- Story by: Chris Rock; Nelson George
- Produced by: Nelson George
- Starring: Chris Rock; Allen Payne; Deezer D; Charlie Murphy; Khandi Alexander; Phil Hartman; Chris Elliott
- Cinematography: Karl Walter Lindenlaub
- Edited by: Earl Watson
- Music by: John Barnes
- Production companies: Imagine Entertainment; The Sean Daniel Company
- Distributed by: Universal Pictures
- Release date: March 12, 1993
- Running time: 89 minutes
- Country: United States
- Language: English
- Budget: $6 million
- Box office: $17.9 million

CB4 is a 1993 American mockumentary film directed by Tamra Davis and starring Chris Rock. The film follows a fictional rap group named "CB4", named after the prison block in which the group was allegedly formed (Cell Block 4). The movie primarily parodies gangsta rap and the rap group N.W.A, as well as taking inspiration from This Is Spinal Tap. It contains short segments featuring celebrities and musicians such as Halle Berry, Eazy-E, Butthole Surfers, Ice-T, Ice Cube, Flavor Flav, and Shaquille O'Neal.

== Plot ==
Albert Brown, an aspiring rapper and suburban kid who idolizes the gangsta rappers he sees on TV, decides to start a rap group with his friends, Euripides and Otis. Unfortunately, even though all three of them are talented, they have no connections and no image with which they can market themselves.

In order to get their name heard and build up a reputation, they appeal to local crime kingpin and nightclub owner Gusto, along with his sidekick and henchman 40 Dog, to ask for a spot on the bill at his club. During their meeting, by complete coincidence, the police rush in and throw Gusto in jail. Gusto believes that the trio set him up, swearing revenge when he is released from prison. Taking advantage of the situation, Albert steals his criminal background and identity, renaming himself "MC Gusto" while Euripides and Otis take the names "Dead Mike" and "Stab Master Arson", respectively. Pretending to be newly released convicts, they form the hardcore gangsta rap group CB4 (Cell Block 4) and successfully sign with Trustus Jones, a local music mogul.

CB4 quickly becomes the hottest band on the charts with controversial hits like "Sweat from My Balls" and "Straight Outta LoCash," and their rise to fame is documented by an aspiring director and his cameraman. However, an ambitious politician seeks to shut them down for obscenity charges, tensions between the group arise over one member's gold-digging groupie girlfriend, Sissy, and the strain of the charade takes its toll on Albert's family life and relationship with his wholesome girlfriend, Daliha. To compound this, the real Gusto escapes from prison and exacts his revenge by making Albert take part in a record store robbery, exposing his face to the CCTV cameras, and then taking the tape as a tool for blackmail so he can profit from Albert's success.

CB4 breaks up, with Dead Mike becoming an Afrocentric rapper. At the same time, Stab Master Arson establishes himself as a successful DJ, leaving Albert to wallow in self-pity and his growing addiction to drugs. One day, he gets a call from Mike that Trustus is dead, having choked to death in terror while eating when Gusto pointed a gun at him in a restaurant. Fed up with Gusto taking everything he has, Albert decides to set up a sting operation to nab the gangster by having Sissy seduce him and then trading places with her to entrap Gusto so the police can arrest him and send him to prison for life.

Albert accepts that he is not a gangsta and makes a comeback under his own name. He persuades Mike and Stab Master Arson to reform the group, and they embark on a highly successful reunion tour.

== Cast ==
- Chris Rock as Albert Brown / M.C. Gusto, the protagonist and a rapper who steals the identity of a hardened criminal to sell records.
- Allen Payne as Euripides / Dead Mike, Albert's childhood friend who joins CB4 but eventually grows disenchanted with pretending to be a gangsta and starts making more politically themed rap music.
- Deezer D as Otis / Stab Master Arson, Albert's other childhood friend who becomes CB4's DJ before starting a solo career.
- Chris Elliott as A. White, an ambitious director who chronicles CB4's rise to fame.
- Phil Hartman as Virgil Robinson, a local politician who seeks to capitalize on the backlash against gangsta rappers by speaking out against CB4, even having them arrested on stage for obscenity.
- Charlie Murphy as "Gusto", an actual gangster who has his identity stolen by Albert and swears to take revenge on him.
- Khandi Alexander as Sissy, a groupie who sleeps with both Mike and Albert, driving them apart. She eventually redeems herself by helping the group take down Gusto.
- Art Evans as Albert Brown Sr., Albert's father who disapproves of gangsta rap, believing it to be just another fad.
- Theresa Randle as Eve
- Willard E. Pugh as "Trustus" Jones, CB4's manager and owner of a local gangsta rap label. He dies after Gusto scares him and he chokes to death on his dinner.
- Ty Granderson Jones as "40 Dog", Gusto's enforcer.
- Rachel True as Daliha, Albert's girlfriend who dislikes gangsta rap.
- Victor Wilson as Lieutenant Davenport
- Richard Gant as "Baa-Baa" Ack
- J. D. Daniels as Julia Robinson
- Stoney Jackson as "Wacky Dee", a parody of early pop rappers such as MC Hammer. Albert hates his music even though the rest of his family likes it.
- Isaac Hayes as The Owner

=== Cameos ===
- Ice-T as himself
- Halle Berry as herself
- Ice Cube as himself
- Flavor Flav as himself
- Shaquille O'Neal as himself
- Eazy-E as himself
- Tommy Davidson as Weird Warren (uncredited)
- Butthole Surfers as Themselves

== Soundtrack ==
A soundtrack containing hip hop music was released on March 2, 1993, by MCA Records. It peaked at #41 on the Billboard 200 and #13 on the Top R&B/Hip-Hop Albums.

== Reception ==
The movie had a mixed reception from critics. Los Angeles Times wrote that despite CB4 having been "one of the more adventurous of the recent African-American comedies, it still gets bogged down in those movie-movie formulas, those phony recipes for success." The New York Times' Janet Maslin wrote that the film "promises sharper satire than it actually delivers. Pandering a shade too avidly to the real rap audience, the film sometimes tries to use the same sexist, mean-spirited ethos it makes fun of."

The movie currently holds a rating of 52% "Rotten" rating on Rotten Tomatoes, based on 27 reviews.

=== Box office ===
The film ranked No. 1 at the box office in its opening weekend, with sales totaling $6,116,000 across 1,205 theaters. At the end of its domestic run it had grossed a total of $17,953,778. Chris Rock stated that the film's budget was $6 million.

== See also ==
- Fear of a Black Hat
- List of hood films
