= Caroline McWilliams =

American actress (1945–2010)

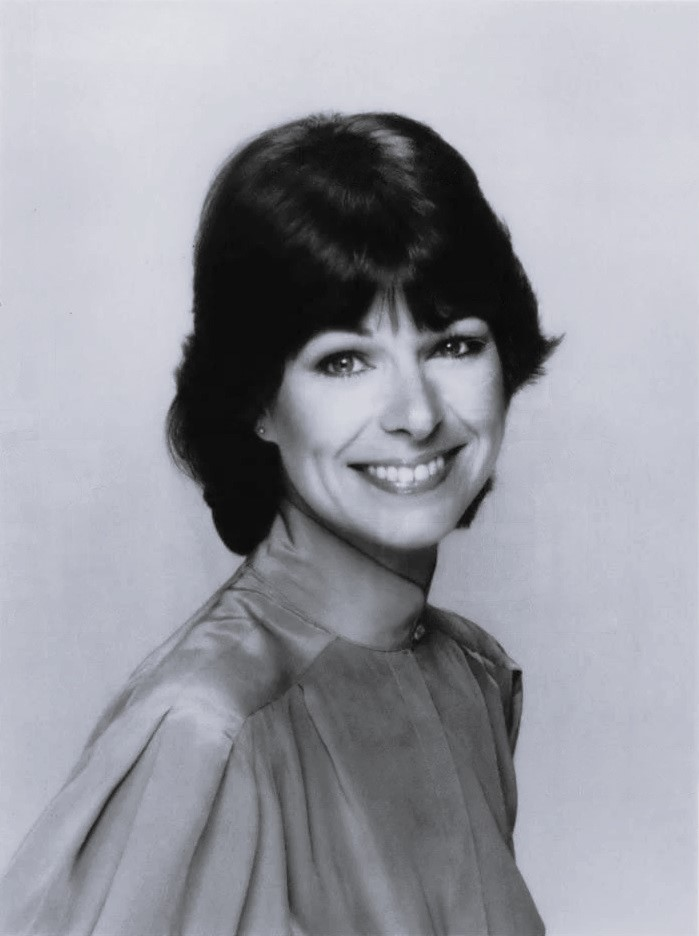
- McWilliams as Marcy Hill in Benson (1981)
- Born: April 4, 1945; Seattle, Washington, U.S.
- Died: February 11, 2010 (aged 64); Los Angeles, California, U.S.
- Education: Carnegie Mellon University
- Occupation: Actress
- Years active: 1967–2003
- Known for: Benson; Soap; Guiding Light; Beverly Hills, 90210
- Spouse: Michael Keaton (m. 1982; div. 1990)
- Children: Sean Douglas

Caroline Margaret McWilliams (April 4, 1945 – February 11, 2010) was an American actress, best known for her portrayal of Marcy Hill in the television series Benson. McWilliams had also appeared in nine episodes of its parent-series Soap, as Sally. She was a regular on the CBS soap Guiding Light (as Janet Norris) for several years and appeared in a short-term role (as Tracy DeWitt) on the NBC soap Another World. She also had a recurring role on Beverly Hills, 90210 playing the mother of Jamie Walters's character, Ray Pruit.

== Early years ==
McWilliams was born in Seattle, Washington on April 4, 1945 to Dr. Joseph G McWilliams Jr and Pattie Dwell, and grew up in Barrington, Rhode Island. She graduated in 1966 with a bachelor's degree from Carnegie Mellon University in Pittsburgh.

== Career ==
McWilliams's television appearances spanned every decade from the 1960s through the 2000s. She was a regular player on Guiding Light as Janet Mason Norris from 1969 until 1975. She portrayed a prostitute who helped an immigrant stay in the country by marrying him for money on Barney Miller in 1977. She was a semi-regular on Soap during the second season in 1978. She then appeared on Benson (as a different character) when that series premiered in 1979. She remained on Benson until 1981; the storyline stated that her character was departing to move away with her husband (her fiancé-turned-husband on the show having been played by Ted Danson).

On stage, she appeared in the musical Boccaccio, Cat on a Hot Tin Roof, The Rothschilds and productions with the American Shakespeare Festival in Stratford, Connecticut, and the New York Shakespeare Festival.

After this, she made a number of appearances in television comedies and dramas, including Kojak; Quincy, M.E.; The Incredible Hulk; $weepstake$; Project U.F.O.; Hill Street Blues; Night Court; St. Elsewhere; Cagney & Lacey; Sisters (two episodes); Home Improvement; Murphy Brown and Judging Amy (three episodes). In 1989, she portrayed the ghostly wife, Clair Pritchard, in the short-lived comedy series Nearly Departed. She also appeared in numerous made-for-television movies, including The Death of Ocean View Park (1979), Rage! (1980), The Gift of Life (1982), and Sworn to Silence (1987). In 1982, she starred in Cass Malloy, a CBS sitcom television pilot which aired as a one-off that summer but did not result in a regular series, although it served as the basis for She's the Sheriff, which aired in first-run syndication from 1987 to 1989 with Suzanne Somers in the starring role.

McWilliams appeared in two major motion pictures:

- White Water Summer (1987) – as Virginia Block
- Mermaids (1990) – as Carrie

== Personal life and death ==
McWilliams was married to, and divorced from, Michael Keaton, with whom she had a son, Sean. Through their son, McWilliams and Keaton have two grandchildren. She died from multiple myeloma at her home in Los Angeles, California, on February 11, 2010, aged 64.
