= Kelly Ward =

American actor (born 1956)

- Born: November 17, 1956 (age 69); San Diego, California, United States
- Occupations: Actor, voice director, writer, editor
- Years active: 1976–present
- Spouse: Annette Foster (m. 1977)
- Children: 3

Kelly Ward (born November 17, 1956) is an American actor, voice director and writer for television animation. He is most famous for his role as T-Bird Putzie in Grease (1978).

== Biography ==
Ward was born in San Diego. He is the son of Don and Bonnie Ward, who were active in theatre in San Diego for decades. His brother is Kirby Ward.

He first gained national attention as a character in the television film The Boy in the Plastic Bubble, which starred John Travolta as the title character. The role began a short acting career for Ward; when Travolta was cast in the 1978 film Grease, Ward was cast as Putzie, a character created specifically for the film.

Ward mostly stopped appearing on-camera in 1983; he continues to work in the entertainment industry. He is a voice director for Disney Television Animation, and has voice directed Mickey Mouse Clubhouse, Jake and the Never Land Pirates, and Star vs. the Forces of Evil, among many others.

He teaches musical theatre at the University of Southern California.

== Acting career ==
- GoBots: Battle of the Rock Lords (1986) – Fitor (voice)
- Challenge of the GoBots (1984) – Fitor (voice)
- Magnum, P.I. (TV series)
  - "The Big Blow" (1983) – Lou Blassingame
- Quincy M.E. (TV series)
  - "Next Stop, Nowhere" (1982) – Skip
- Into the Murdering Mind (1982) – Glenn Werner
- Bret Maverick (TV series)
  - "The Not So Magnificent Six" (1982) – Willie Trueblood
- Zoot Suit (1981) – Thomas 'Tommy' Roberts
- The Big Red One (1980) – Pvt. Johnson, 1st Squad
- M*A*S*H (TV series)
  - "Dear Uncle Abdul" (1979) – Dave
- The Waltons (TV series)
  - "The Violated" (1979) – Frank Thatcher
- Grease (1978) – Putzie
- Deadman's Curve (1978 TV movie) – Billy
- CHiPs (TV series) – Doug
- The Boy in the Plastic Bubble (1976 TV movie) – Tom Shuster

== Screenwriting credits ==
=== Television ===
- Challenge of the GoBots (1985)
- Wildfire (1986)
- Sky Commanders (1987)
- Popeye and Son (1987)
- Fantastic Max (1988)
- The Completely Mental Misadventures of Ed Grimley (1988)
- The Further Adventures of SuperTed (1989)
- The Pirates of Dark Water (1991)
- Voltron: The Third Dimension (1998–2000)
- The New Woody Woodpecker Show (1999)
- Horrible Histories (2001–2002)
- Butt-Ugly Martians (2002)
- Liberty's Kids (2002–2003)
- Trollz (2005)
- Firehouse Tales (2005-2006)
- Jakers! The Adventures of Piggley Winks (2004–2006)
- Wow! Wow! Wubbzy! (2006)
- Crime Time (2008)
- Mickey Mouse Clubhouse (2006-2016)
- Jake and the Never Land Pirates (2011–2014)

=== Film ===
- Once Upon a Forest (1993)
- All Dogs Go to Heaven 2 (1996)
