= GoBots =

Toy line by Tonka

- Created by: Tonka
- Original work: Machine Robo

Films and television
- Film(s): GoBots: Battle of the Rock Lords
- Animated series: Challenge of the GoBots

Miscellaneous
- Toy(s): GoBots; Rock Lords
- Related franchises: Transformers

GoBots was an American media franchise that was a line of transforming robot toys produced by Tonka from 1983 to 1987, similar to Hasbro's Transformers.

Although initially a separate and competing line of toys, Tonka's Gobots became the intellectual property of Hasbro after their buyout of Tonka in 1991. Subsequently, the universe depicted in the animated series Challenge of the GoBots and follow-up film GoBots: Battle of the Rock Lords was established as an alternate universe within the Transformers multiverse. While Hasbro now owns the fictional side of the property (character names, bios, storyline), the actual toys and their likenesses were only licensed from Bandai in the 1980s, were not covered by the Tonka acquisition, and are not available for Hasbro use.

== History ==
The GoBot toy line was based on figures produced by Popy of Japan (the now-defunct character division of Bandai), named Machine Robo. In another similarity to Transformers, Tonka decided to make the figures sentient robots, rather than human-piloted mecha as they had been in Japan. The robots were divided into two factions, the good Guardians and evil Renegades. However, early figures were simply described as ‘Friendly’ or ‘Enemy’ on the packaging. The figures were all given individual names, in contrast to the simple designations they received in Japan.

Introduced in 1983 by Tonka Inc., the GoBots toys were part of the robot "sensation" that swept the nation for a short time.

The line sold well initially, but was overtaken by Transformers. 1987 was the final year in which new Gobots were released. In 1991, Hasbro acquired the rights to the names to the entire Gobot franchise, but not to their likenesses, from Tonka Inc.; the GoBots therefore cannot be re-released.

== Releases ==
Tonka released the first batch of figures to stores in 1983, one year prior to the Transformers. The bulk of the Gobot line was taken from the Machine Robo "600 Series" line of figures, which were around 5–8 cm (2.0–3.1 in)high on average. The robot figures transformed into a mixture of generic and specific contemporary machines, plus a handful of Second World War fighter aircraft, and a number of futuristic designs. This unnamed assortment, usually referred to as "Regular" Gobots, was used throughout the four years Gobots were produced and was later supplemented by figures from the Machine Robo Devil Invaders sub-line, plus some aborted Machine Robo figures and some commissioned from Bandai by Tonka.

Larger figures, averaging around 12–15 cm (4.7–5.9 in) tall in robot mode, were released as Super Gobots. Some of these were drawn from the Machine Robo Scale Robo DX line, some from the MR Big Machine Robo line (these included larger versions of Leader-1, the Guardian leader, and Cy-Kill, the Renegade leader) and some designs not released in Japan. The line also included two gestalt-style figures, the car-based Puzzler and monster-based Monsterous.

Several other ranges were drawn from existing Bandai figures (such as the Secret Riders).

Tonka did design some toys for the line, including the Guardian Command Center and Renegade Thruster playsets, and the motorized Renegade Zod. In addition to these, two versions of the Power Warrior were made for both the Guardians and the Renegades, using molds from the Machine Robo line and recolored. The Nemesis Power Warrior used a tank for the center body and was released only in Japan. A large playset called the Gobotron Fortress was also shown to have existed in various articles and catalogues, but it has never been released.

A spin-off line, Rock Lords, crossed over with the Gobots in the feature film GoBots: Battle of the Rock Lords, and was issued as a separate toy line by Tonka in 1986.

Standard figures. Note: The figures were not always released in numerical order.

| # | Name | Vehicle mode | MR number |
|---|---|---|---|
| 01 | Cy-Kill | Motorcycle | MR-01 |
| 02 | Tank | Tank | MR-02 |
| 03 | Fitor | Jet | MR-03 |
| 04 | Cop-Tur | Helicopter | MR-04 |
| 05 | Loco | JNR Class D51 | MR-05 |
| 06 | Spay-C | Space Shuttle | MR-14 |
| 07 | Turbo | Supercar | MR-07 |
| 08 | BuggyMan | Meyers Manx | MR-08 |
| 09 | Dumper | Dump truck | MR-09 |
| 10 | Pumper | Fire engine | MR-10 |
| 11 | Dozer | Komatsu D155A | MR-11 |
| 12 | Hans-Cuff | Toyota Crown S110 | MR-13 |
| 13 | Fly Trap | Garbage truck | MR-26 |
| 14 | Small Foot | Toyota Hilux SR5 | MR-35 |
| 15 | Dive-Dive | Los Angeles-class submarine | MR-33 |
| 16 | Slicks | Renault RE20 | MR-32 |
| 17 | Block Head | Nissan Cement Mixer Truck | MR-34 |
| 18 | Road Ranger | Hino HE Flatbed Trailer Truck | MR-18 |
| 19 | Royal-T | Harrier GR5 | MR-19 |
| 20 | Spoiler | Countach LP500S | MR-21 |
| 21 | Crasher | Porsche 956 | MR-20 |
| 22 | Screw Head | Drilling vehicle | MR-17 |
| 23 | Blaster | Missile tank | MR-23 |
| 24 | Crain Brain | UNIC K-200B | MR-24 |

| # | Name | Vehicle mode | MR number |
|---|---|---|---|
| 25 | Leader-1 | F-15 Eagle | MR-25 |
| 26 | Rest-Q | Nissan Caravan Ambulance | MR-15 |
| 27 | Scooter | Scooter (motorcycle) | MR-16 |
| 28 | Geeper-Creeper | Mitsubishi Jeep CJ-3B | MR-28 |
| 29 | Path Finder | Flying Saucer | MR-29 |
| 30 | Night Ranger | Harley-Davidson FLHC | MR-37 |
| 31 | Spoons | Komatsu Forklift | MR-34 |
| 32 | Water Walk | Seaplane | MR-31 |
| 33 | Flip-Top | SH-2 Seasprite | MR-40 |
| 34 | Good Knight | Excalibur Series III | MR-44 |
| 35 | Blaster | Missile tank | MR-23 |
| 36 | Street Heat | Chevrolet Camaro Z28 | MR-43 |
| 37 | Wrong Way | AH-64 Apache | MR-41 |
| 38 | Scratch | GMC S-15 Jimmy | MRT-41 |
| 39 | BuggyMan (V2) | Meyers Manx | MR-08 |
| 40 | Zero | A6M Zero | MR-39 |
| 41 | Tux | Rolls-Royce Phantom VI | MR-46 |
| 42 | Twin Spin | CH-46 Sea Knight | MR-50 |
| 43 | Snoop | SR-71 Blackbird | MR-45 |
| 44 | Leader-1 (V2) | F-15 Eagle | MR-25 |
| 45 | Cy-Kill (V2) | Motorcycle | MR-01 |
| 46 | Vamp | Spaceship | MRD-101 |
| 47 | Scorp | Robotic scorpion | MRD-102 |
| 48 | Pincher | Spaceship | MRD-103 |

| # | Name | Vehicle mode | MR number |
|---|---|---|---|
| 49 | Stallion | Ford Mustang | MRT-45 |
| 50 | Sparky | Pontiac Fiero | MRT-43 |
| 51 | Van Guard | Dodge Caravan | MRT-42* |
| 52 | Heat Seeker | F-16 Falcon | MR-49 |
| 53 | Stinger | Chevrolet Corvette | MRT-44 |
| 54 | Major Mo | Nissan 300ZX Z31 | MR-48 |
| 55 | Bad Boy | A-10 Thunderbolt II | MR-47 |
| 56 | Creepy | Robotic crab | MRD-104 |
| 57 | Tail Pipe | Nissan Skyline RS | MR-42 |
| 58 | Bugsie | Monster | n/a |
| 59 | Bladez | Monster | MRD-105 |
| 60 | Klaws | Spaceship | n/a |
| 61 | Hornet | Jet | n/a |
| 62 | Treds | M1 Abrams | n/a |
| 63 | Bullseye | B-1 Lancer | n/a |
| 64 | Mr. Moto | Honda 200X | n/a |
| 65 | Mach-3 | F-4 Phantom | MR-51 |
| 66 | Man-O-War | Iowa-class battleship | MR-54 |
| 67 | Ace | P-51 Mustang | n/a |
| 68 | Bolt | P-38 Lightning | n/a |
| 69 | Dart | Honda VF1000R | n/a |
| 70 | Sky Jack | F-14 Tomcat | MR-52 |
| 71 | Gunnyr | MiG-21 | n/a |
| 72 | Bentwing | F4U Corsair | n/a |

† = release cancelled.

Super GoBots

| # | Name | Vehicle mode | MR number |
|---|---|---|---|
| 020 | Warpath | AH-64 Apache | BMR-04 |
| 021 | Cy-Kill | Motorcycle | BMR-01 |
| 022 | Spay-C | Space Shuttle | BMR-05 |
| 023 | Staks | Peterbilt 352H | BMR-03 |
| 024 | Leader-1 | F-15 Eagle | BMR-02 |
| 025 | Baron Von Joy | Porsche 930 Turbo | MRDX-07 |

| # | Name | Vehicle mode | MR number |
|---|---|---|---|
| 026 | Zeemon | Datsun Fairlady 280ZX | MRDX-02 |
| 027 | Herr Fiend | Porsche 928S | MRDX-03 |
| 028 | Bug Bite | Volkswagen Beetle | MRDX-05 |
| 029 | Destroyer | Leopard 1A4 | MRDX-04 |
| 030 | Psycho | Psychoroid | MRDX-01 |
| 031 | Defendor | Saladin Mk. II | MRDX-06 |

| # | Name | Vehicle mode | MR number |
|---|---|---|---|
| 032 | Throttle | BMW K100 | n/a |
| 033 | Raizor | F-4 Phantom | n/a |
| 034 | Vamp | Spaceship | n/a |
| 035 | Super Couper | Ford Coupe | n/a |
| 036 | Spy-Eye | Tornado IDS | n/a |
| 037 | Clutch | Ford F-250 | n/a |
| 038 | Night Fright | Mi-24 | n/a |

Power Warriors

Name
Courageous
Grungy

Puzzler: Six smaller robots that combined into a single larger super-robot, sold both separately and as a giftset.

| Name | Vehicle mode |
|---|---|
| Crossword | Porsche 930 |
| Jig Saw | Toyota Celica XX |
| Pocket | Lamborghini Countach |
| Rube | Mercedes-Benz 500 |
| Tic Tac | Chevrolet Corvette |
| Zig Zag | Nissan 300ZX |

Monstrous: Six smaller robots that combined into a single larger super-robot, sold both separately and as a giftset.

| Name | Vehicle mode |
|---|---|
| Fangs | Monster |
| Fright Face | Monster |
| Gore Jaw | Monster |
| Heart Attack | Monster |
| South Claw | Monster |
| Weird Wing | Monster |

Boomers

| Name | Vehicle mode |
|---|---|
| Blast | Buggy |
| Rumble | Buggy |

Secret Riders

| Name | Vehicle mode |
|---|---|
| Tork | Ford Ranger |
| Tri-Trak | Honda 200X |
| Twister | Helicopter |

Dread Launchers

| Name | Vehicle mode |
|---|---|
| Chaos | X-29 & transporter |
| Re-Volt | Hawk & launchpad |
| Traitor | Wasp & launchpad |

Power Marchers

Name
Hitch Hiker
Quick Step

Others

Name
Command Center
GoBotron Fortress
Scales
Space Hawk
Thruster
Zod

== Media ==
Cover to #2 of the Gobots comic series by IDW Publishing. Art by Tom Scioli.

Hanna-Barbera produced a cartoon series called Challenge of the GoBots to promote the toy line, which ran for 65 22-minute episodes from 1984 to 1985. In 1986, soon after the end of the Challenge of the Gobots television series, the Gobots co-starred with the Rock Lords in an animated feature film GoBots: Battle of the Rock Lords, again produced by Hanna-Barbera.

In 1984, two Gobot children's books were published by Golden Books, an imprint of Western Publishing. The books, titled War of the Gobots and Gobots on Earth, were written by Robin Snyder and illustrated by Steve Ditko, and chronicled the origins of the Gobots. The Gobots were also featured in the 1986 book Collision Course Comet - Robo Machine Featuring The Challenge Of The Gobots and the 1985 book The Wagner Sirens-Robo Machine Featuring The Challenge Of The Gobots, both of which were published by Egmont Books.

The closest thing to a Gobot comic book was the Gobots Magazine, produced by Telepictures Publishing. This included a short comic strip, based on the Challenge of the GoBots cartoon continuity, as well as features on real-life robots, quiz pages and the like. It ran quarterly from winter 1986 to winter 1987, managing five issues. Unlike the Transformers comics, it was aimed at a very young readership.

In the UK, a Robo Machines comic strip was produced. The comic used many of the characters from the Gobot line, but following a different continuity than the cartoon. This was written by Tom Tully, and ran in the second volume of Eagle from November 1984 to July 1985. After Fleetway discontinued their licence agreement, the property was leased to World Distributors, who produced annuals following the cartoon continuity in 1986 and 1987.

A Gobots video game was released in 1986 by Ariolasoft for the Commodore 64, Amstrad CPC, and ZX Spectrum computer formats. Gobots software for other computers, home video game systems or coin-operated arcade game systems is unknown at this time.

It was announced that Hasbro has applied for a new Go-Bots trademark (this is not a renewal) under "distribution of motion pictures, ongoing television programs" and "Toys, games and playthings, namely, toy vehicles and accessories for use therewith.

In October 2018, IDW began publishing a Go-Bots mini series written and illustrated by Tom Scioli.

== Worldwide ==
Unlike Transformers, Gobots was released in several guises around the world.

- In the UK, France and a number of other European countries, Bandai released the figures as Robo Machine, utilising most of the Tonka names. Later on, when the Challenge of the Gobots cartoon arrived, this was changed, or modified (often resulting in clumsy branding such as Robo Machines featuring Challenge of the Gobots or Challenge of the Gobots - A Robo Machine Production).
- In Australia, the line was released as Machine Men. The Machine Men name had been used also by Bandai in an item to market Machine Robo in America in early 1984, but after issuing six figures the line failed. However, Bandai's Australian release was successful enough to retain the Machine Men branding, which was even added to the cartoon when that began airing.
- In Brazil, the line was initially produced by Glasslite as Mutante. The license was later taken over by Mimo.
- It was also translated into Arabic and retitled Hikayat alamaliqa, or A Tale of Giants.
- In Japan, Bandai opted to keep with the Machine Robo line, rather than importing the Gobots due to licensing issues.

== Transformers ==
In 1991, Hasbro took over Tonka, and thus the Gobot trademarks; the molds for the action figures remain the property of Bandai, having only been leased to Tonka, and some were reissued in 1993 for the European Robo Machines line. Since then, the trademarks have been used several times — a character called Gobots was released in 1993, a range of figures in 1995 was called the Go-Bots, and Hasbro subsidiary Playskool issued a line named Transformers: Gobots in 2002. To this date, there have been a few exclusives referencing GoBots, but they have all been recolors of other Transformer molds as opposed to new figures. Examples of this are the Transformers 2007 movie-themed Fracture (based on Crasher) and Backtrack (based on Night Ranger; unreleased, but shown in promotional materials) and Revenge of the Fallen figures Deadlift (based on Spoons) and Reverb (based on Dart). Also, Botcon 2007 Bugbite, an off-white repaint of Classics Bumblebee, was released as the second Bug Bite toy in Transformers. The first Bug Bite was a Japanese-exclusive white repaint of Generation 1 Bumblebee which retained Bug Bites VW Beetle vehicle mode. The color change to white was due to Bumblebee and Bug Bite sharing the colors yellow and black in their original competing releases.

The name Leader-1 was reused for Transformers Armada Megatron's mini-con in 2002.

While Hasbro has used current toy technology to update their G1 Transformer characters over the years, it is unlikely that Gobots will receive similar treatment, as the molds—and thus, the original character designs—belong to Bandai.

In 1995, a line of Transformers called Go-Bots (small, Matchbox-sized car Transformers which had racing axles) were released, including Bumblebee, Double Clutch, High Beam, Ironhide, Megatron, Mirage, Optimus Prime, Soundwave, Sideswipe, and Frenzy. Of the 6 molds produced, 15 Go-Bot characters were released, including the 1995 BotCon convention exclusive figure, Nightracer (a recoloring of Go-Bot Bumblebee). Subsequent uses of these molds were renamed Spy Changers.

Gearhead was used to demonstrate the Hasbro Go-Bots line at Toy Fair 1995. They were described by the pitch-man as "The all-new, most mind-blowing, laser-slashing, robot-bashing product line ever!"

A deleted scene included in the Blu-Ray release of the 2018 film Bumblebee, set in 1987, involves the character Guillermo Gutierrez asking the protagonist Charlie Watson if the Transformers are like the fictional toy line GoBots.

== See also ==
- Challenge of the GoBots (1984)
- GoBots: Battle of the Rock Lords (1986)
- Robo Machines (1984)
