= Ty Granderson Jones =

American actor, screenwriter, producer

- Born: Tyrone Granderson Jones; January 19, 1964 (age 62); Tampa Bay, Florida, U.S.
- Education: Florida State University (BS); University of California, San Diego (MFA)
- Occupations: Actor, screenwriter, producer
- Years active: 1982–present

Tyrone Granderson Jones (born January 19, 1964) is a Creole American actor, screenwriter and producer. He has an MFA from the graduate acting program at the University of California, San Diego.

== Filmography ==
=== Film ===
Year	Title	Role	Notes
1986	Salvador	San Francisco Landlord (as Tyrone Jones)	
1988	Angel III: The Final Chapter	L.A. Pimp (as Tyrone Granderson Jones)	
1988	Twins	Mover #2 (as Tyrone Granderson Jones)	
1989	Harlem Nights	Crapshooter (as Tyrone Granderson Jones)	
1990	Going Under	Quizby (as Tyrone Granderson Jones)	
1993	CB4	40 Dog (as Tyrone Granderson Jones)	
1997	Con Air	Blade (as Tyrone Granderson Jones)	
2000	Whatever It Takes	Toothless Carnie (as Tyrone Granderson Jones)	
2003	Tapped Out	Max Rice	
2005	Short Fuse	Big Paul	
2010	Napoleonic	Andre Bozant	
2011	Crows	Harry	
2012	Jennifer (Short)	Theo	
2012	Window of Opportunity	Byron	

=== Television ===
Year	Title	Role	Notes
1982	Cagney & Lacey	Convict	
1985	Handsome Harry's	Roosevelt (as Tyrone G. Jones)	
1985	Children of the Night	Pimp (uncredited)	
1987	227	Man #3	
1987-1989	Webster	Lorenzo	
1990	Gabriel's Fire	Gangbanger	
1990-1991	The New Adam-12	Toby / Guapo	
1992	Reasonable Doubts	Dennis Gilyard	
1993	The Jackie Thomas Show	Movie Director	
1995	Courthouse	Psycho Patient	
1997	Dark Skies	Cop	
2001	UC: Undercover	Gigante	
2006	Everybody Hates Chris	Bully #2	
2006	ER	Hector Rodriguez	
