= List of Japanese television series =

This is a list of Japanese television series. The programs are listed alphabetically and are followed by the genre of the show and the date of the original run. For a chronological list, see List of Japanese television programs by date.

== 0–9 ==
- 009-1 - Anime, 2006
- 8 Man - Anime, 1963-1964

== A ==
- Abarenbō Shōgun - Jidaigeki, 1978-2003, 2004, 2008
- Ai no Gakko Cuore Monogatari - Anime, 1981
- Aikatsu! - Anime, 2012-2016
- Aikurushii - Drama, 2005
- Aim for the Ace! - Anime, 1973-1974, 1978-1979
- Aim for the Ace! - Drama, 2004
- Ainori - Reality show, 1999-2009
- Akai Meiro
- AKBingo! - Variety Show, 2008–present
- Alfred J. Kwak - Anime, 1989-1990
- All Night Fuji
- Anchan
- Aoi Sekai no Chūshin de - Anime, 2012
- As the Bell Rings
- Asayan - 1995-2002
- Ashita ga Arusa - Drama, 2001
- Asu no Hikari o Tsukame - Drama, 2011-2013
- Attack No. 1 - Anime, 1969-1971
- Attack No. 1 - Drama, 2005
- Azumanga Daioh - Anime, 2002
- Arcana Famiglia

== B ==
- Baby Felix - Anime, 2000-2001
- Baldios - Anime, 1980-1981
- Baribari Value - Game show, 2003–present
- Bakugan - Anime, 2007–13
- Baxinger - Anime, 1982-1983
- Bayside Shakedown - Police drama, 1997, 1998
- Beast King GoLion - Anime, 1981-1982
- Binta! ~Bengoshi Jimuin Minowa ga Ai de Kaiketsushimasu~ - Drama, 2014
- Black Clover - Anime, 2017–present
- Bleach (anime) - Anime, 2004-2012 (with the Thousand-Year Blood War saga airing starting in 2022)
- Blocker Gundan 4 Machine Blaster - Anime, 1976-1977
- Bloodivores - Anime, 2016
- Blue Comet SPT Layzner - Anime, 1985-1986
- Blue Exorcist
- Boruto: Naruto Next Generations - Anime, 2017
- Bosco Adventure - Anime, 1986-1987
- Braiger - Anime, 1981-1982
- Brave Raideen - Anime, 1975-1976
- Bumpety Boo - Anime, 1985-1986
- Beyond The Boundary
- Brothers' Conflict

== C ==
- Calimero - Anime, 1974-1975
- Calimero - Anime, 1992-1993
- Captain Future - Anime, 1978-1979
- Cardcaptor Sakura - Anime, 1998-2000
- Cat's Eye - Anime, 1983-1985
- Cheating Craft - Anime, 2016
- Chō Kōsoku Galvion - Anime, 1984
- Chōdenji Machine Voltes V - Anime, 1977-1978
- Chōdenji Robo Combattler V - Anime, 1976-1977
- Chōgattai Majutsu Robo Ginguiser - Anime, 1977
- Chōshichirō Edo Nikki - 1983-1991
- Chōyū Sekai - Anime, 2017
- Chousei Kantai Sazer-X - Tokusatsu, 2005-2006
- Chouseishin Gransazer - Tokusatsu, 2003-2004
- Close-up Gendai
- Cobra - Anime, 1982-1983
- Code Geass - Anime, 2006-2008
- Cowboy Bebop - Anime, 1998-1999
- Crayon Shin-chan - Anime, 1992–present

== D ==
- Daichūshingura - Jidaigeki, 1971
- Daitetsujin 17 - Tokusatsu, 1977
- Daitokai
- Daitokai Part II
- Daitsuiseki
- Daltanius - Anime, 1979-1980
- Dancouga - Super Beast Machine God - Anime, 1985
- Dansen
- Dear Sister - Drama, 2014
- Death Note - Drama, 2015
- Demetan Croaker, The Boy Frog - Anime, 1973
- Diabolik Lovers - Anime, 2013
- Digimon Adventure - Anime, 1999 - 2000
- Digimon Adventure 02 - Anime, 2000 - 2001
- Digimon Adventure tri - Anime, upcoming
- Digimon Frontier - Anime, 2002 - 2003
- Digimon Savers - Anime, 2006 - 2007
- Digimon Tamers - Anime, 2001 - 2002
- Digimon Xros Wars - Anime, 2010 - 2012
- Dirty Pair - Anime, 1985
- Dokuganryū Masamune
- Do Re Mi no TV - Educational
- Doraemon (1973) - Anime, 1973
- Doraemon (1979) - Anime, 1979 - 2005
- Doraemon (2005) - Anime, 2005–present
- Dosanko Wide 179- News, 1991–present
- Dotch Cooking Show - Cooking show, 1997-2005
- Downtown no Gaki no Tsukai ya Arahende!! - Variety show, 1989–present
- Downtown no Gottsu Ee Kanji - Variety show, 1991-1997
- Dragon Ball - Anime (based on the manga), 1986–present
  - Dragon Ball - 1986-1989
  - Dragon Ball GT - 1996-1997
  - Dragon Ball Kai - 2009-2015
  - Dragon Ball Z - 1989-1996
  - Dragon Ball Super - 2015–present
- Dragon Zakura - Drama, 2005
- Dr Slump - Anime (based on the manga), 1981-1986
- Dr. Stone - Anime, 2019–present
- Dynamic China - Documentary, 2007-2008

== E ==
- Edo o Kiru - Jidaigeki, 1973-2004
- Eromanga Sensei - Anime, 2017
- Evening 5 - News, 2005–2007

== F ==
- Fairy Tail - Anime, 2009 - 2013, 2014–present
- Fighting Girl - Drama, 2001
- Flame of Recca - Anime since 1997
- FNN Date Line - News, 1987-1990
- FNS Music Festival - Music show, 1974–present
- Focus Tokushima - News, 1982–present
- Food Fight - Drama, 2000
- Friends - Drama, 2002
- Fugo Keiji - Drama, 2005
- Fullmetal Alchemist - Anime, 2003 – 2004
- Fullmetal Alchemist: Brotherhood - Anime, 2009 - 2010
- Fun TV with Kato-chan and Ken-chan - Variety show, 1986-1992
- Fushigi no Kuni no Alice - Anime, 1983-1984
- Fafner Exodus

== G ==
- Gaiji Keisatsu - Drama, 2009
- Gaiking - Anime, 1976-1977, 2005-2006
- Ganbaron - Tokusatsu, 1977
- Garo - Tokusatsu, 2005
- Genesis Climber MOSPEADA - Anime, 1983-1984
- Genseishin Justirisers - Tokusatsu, 2004-2005
- Getter Robo - Anime, 1974-1975
- Getter Robo G - Anime, 1975-1976
- Getter Robo Go - Anime, 1991-1992
- Gilgamesh Night - Variety show, 1991-1998
- Ginga: Nagareboshi Gin - Anime, 1986
- Glay Global Communication - 2001
- Gloizer X - Anime, 1976-1977
- God Mazinger - Anime, 1984
- Gokenin Zankurō - Jidaigeki, 1995-2002
- Gold - Drama, 2010
- GoShogun - Anime, 1981
- Great Mazinger - Anime, 1974-1975
- Golden Time
- Good Morning Call - 2015

== H ==
- Hadaka no Shounen - Cooking show, 2001–present
- Haikyuu- sport, comedy, 2014
- Hakuba no Ōji-sama Junai Tekireiki - Drama, 2013
- Hand Shakers - Anime, 2017
- Haromoni@ - Variety show, 2007-2008
- Haru ga Kita
- Haruka 17 - Drama, 2005
- Hato no kyojitsu - 1953-2001, 2008–present
- Heavy Metal L-Gaim - Anime, 1984-1985
- Hello! Morning - Variety show, 2000-2007
- Hello! Sandybell - Anime, 1981-1982
- Hey! Hey! Hey! Music Champ - Variety show, 1994–present
- Hey! Spring of Trivia - Variety show, 2002-2006
- Hi Hi PUFFY Bu - Variety, 2006
- High School! Kimengumi - Anime, 1985-1987
- Hikari Ota's If I Were Prime Minister... Secretary Tanaka - Variety show, 2006–present
- Himitsu no Hanazono - Drama, 2007
- Honjitsu wa Taian Nari - Drama, 2012
- How do you like Wednesday? - Variety show, 1996-2007
- Huckleberry no Bouken - Anime, 1976
- Hunter × Hunter Anime, 1999 - 2001
- Hunter × Hunter Anime, 2011 - 2014

== I ==
- Idoling!!! - 2006–2015
- The Idolmaster Cinderella Girls - Anime, 2015
- Ikebukuro West Gate Park - Drama, 2000
- Innocent Love - Drama, 2008
- Invincible Steel Man Daitarn 3 - Anime, 1978-1979
- Invincible Super Man Zambot 3 - Anime, 1977-1978
- IQ Sapuri - 2004–2009
- Iron Chef - Cooking show, 1993-1999
- Ironfist Chinmi - Anime, 1988
- Inuyasha - Anime, 2000-2005

== J ==
- J-Melo - Music show, 2005–present
- JoJo's Bizarre Adventure- Anime, 2012–present
- Journey to the West
- Jungle Book Shonen Mowgli - Anime, 1989-1990
- Jushin Liger - Anime, 1989-1990
- Jūsō Kikō Dancouga Nova - Anime, 2007

== K ==
- Kaiju Booska - Tokusatsu, 1966-1967
- Kaiki Renai Sakusen - Drama, 2015
- Kaitai-Shin Show - 2007–present
- Kamen Rider - Action/adventure, 1971–present
- Kamen Rider Kiva
- Kami-sama Minarai: Himitsu no Cocotama - Anime, 2015
- Kamiwaza Wanda - Anime, 2016
- Karakuri Samurai Sesshaawan 1 - Tokusatsu, 2011
- Kareinaru Tsuiseki
- Kaseifu no Mita - Drama, 2011
- Kasou Taishou
- Kazoku no Katachi - Drama, 2016
- Keijo!!!!!!!! - Anime, 2016
- Kekkon Dekinai Otoko - Drama, 2006
- Kemono Friends - Anime, 2017
- Kikou Kantai Dairugger XV - Anime, 1982-1983
- Kimagure Orange Road - Anime, 1987-1988
- Kinniku Banzuke - Sports entertainment/variety show, 1995-2002
- Kinpachi-sensei - 1979–present
- Kitakubu Katsudō Kiroku - Anime, 2013
- Kodoku no Gourmet - Drama, 2012-ongoing
- Kōhaku Uta Gassen - Music show
- Koko ga hen da yo, nihonjin - 1998-2002
- Kometto-san - Dorama, 1967-1968
- Komi Can't Communicate - Rom-Com, 2021
- Konna Koi no Hanashi - Drama, 1997
- Kotetsushin Jeeg - Anime, 2007
- Kunoichi
- Kamisama Kiss

== L ==
- Legend of Heavenly Sphere Shurato - Anime, 1989-1990
- Liar Game - Drama, 2007
- Lincoln - Variety show, 2005–present
- Lucy of the Southern Rainbow - Anime, 1982

== M ==
- Magical Girl Site - Anime, 2018
- Maya the Honey Bee - Anime, 1975-1980
- Meganebu! - Anime, 2013
- Mentai Waido
- Mirai Sentai Timeranger
- Mitsu no Aji: A Taste of Honey - Drama, 2011
- Miyuki - Anime, 1983–1984
- Monkey
- Massan (2014-2015)
- My Hero Academia -Anime, 2012

== N ==
- Nabari no Ou
- Naruto - Anime, 2002 – 2007
- Naruto Shippuden - Anime, 2007–present
- Nazotoki wa Dinner no Ato de - Drama, 2011
- New Dotch Cooking Show - Cooking show, 2005 - 2006, 2007
- Neon Genesis Evangelion - Anime, 1995-1996
- Nettai ya
- New Game! - Anime, 2016
- NHK News 7 - News, 1993–present
- Nonchan Noriben, Drama, 1997, 1998
- Nyanko Days, Anime, TBA
- Ninja Hattori-kun

== O ==
- Obake no Q-tarō - Anime, 1965-1967, 1971-1972, 1985-1987
- Ojamajo Doremi - Anime, 1999-2004
- Omukae desu - Drama, 2016-scheduled
- One Piece - Anime, 1999–present
- One-Punch Man - Anime, 2015
- Onna Goroshi Abura no Jigoku
- Ookami Shoujo to Kuro Ouji - Anime, 2014
- Ōoku
- Oreimo - 2010-2013
- Oretachi no Kunshō
- Otoko wa Tsurai yo
- Ou Otoko

== P ==
- Panel Quiz Attack 25 - Game show, 1975–present
- Parasol Henbē - Anime, 1989-1991
- Pokémon - Anime, 1997–present
- Ponytail wa Furimukanai - Drama, 1985-1986
- Popee the Performer - CGI Anime, 2001-2002
- Poyopoyo Kansatsu Nikki - Anime, 2012
- Pretty Cure - Anime, 2004–present
- Princess Comet; Kometto-san - 1978, 1979
- Pripara - 2014–present; spin-off of the Pretty Rhythm series, idol anime
- Pretty Rhythm Aurora Dream
- Pretty Rhythm Dear My Future
- Pretty Rhythm Rainbow Live

== R ==
- RAB News Radar - News, 1970–present (only in Aomori prefecture)
- Ranma ½ - Anime, romantic/comedy/adventure, 1989 - 1992
- Rasen - Drama/mystery, 1999
- Rebound - Drama/romantic comedy, 2011
- Ring: The Final Chapter - Drama/mystery, 1999
- Robot Girls Z - Anime, comedy, slice of life, 2014
- Rock Lee & His Ninja Pals - Anime, 2012 - 2013

== S ==
- Saint Seiya - Anime, 1986-1989
- Saint Seiya Omega - Anime, 2012
- Saiyūki
- Sakurako wa Warau
- Saraba Rōnin
- Sasuke - Sports entertainment, 1997–present
- Seiren - Anime, 2017
- Selector Infected WIXOSS - Anime, 2014
- Senhime Zesshō Symphogear - Anime, 2012
- Shingeki no Kyojin - Anime, 2013
- Shi no Dangai
- Shin-Jiken Dr Stop
- Shin-Yumechiyo Nikki
- The Silver Guardian - Anime, 2017
- SKE48 no Magical Radio - Variety show, 2011–present
- SMAP×SMAP - Variety show, 1996–2016
- Sono 'Okodawari', Watashi ni mo Kure yo!! - Drama, 2016
- Sono toki Heartwa Nusumareta - Drama, 1992
- ST Aka to Shirō no Sōsa File - 2014
- Star Musketeer Bismark - Anime, 1984-1985
- Sunao ni Narenakute - Drama, 2010
- Super Seisyun Brothers - Anime, 2013
- Super Sentai - Action/adventure, 1975–present

== T ==
- Taiga drama
- Taiyō ni Hoero!
- Takeda Shingen
- Takeshi's Castle - 1986-1989, 2005
- Tantei Monogatari
- Terrace House: Boys × Girls Next Door
- Terrace House: Boys & Girls in the City
- Terrace House: Aloha State
- To Be Hero - Anime, 2016
- Tokimeki Tonight - Anime, 1982-1983
- Tokyo Friend Park 2 - Game show, 1994–present
- Tokyo Ghoul
- Tokyo Market Express - News/talk show
- Tokyo Market Watch - News/talk show, 2001–present
- Tokyo Market Wrap - News/talk show, 2001–present
- Tokyo Mew Mew
- Tokyo Morning Express - News/talk show, 2003–present
- Tokyo Tarareba Musume - Drama, 2017
- Transformers - Anime, 1984-1987
- Truth or Doubt - 2004-2005
- Tokyo Alien Bros (2018)
- Tsuyoshi Shikkari Shinasai - Anime, 1992-1994

== U ==
- UFO Warrior Dai Apolon - Anime, 1976 - 1977
- Ultra Series - Tokusatsu, 1966–present
  - Ultraman Orb - 2016

== V ==
- Vermilion Pleasure Night - Comedy/variety show, 2000
- Video Warrior Laserion - Anime, 1984-1985
- Viking: The Ultimate Obstacle Course - Sports entertainment, 2005-2007

== W ==
- Wakakusa no Charlotte - Anime, 1977-1978
- Waratte Iitomo! - Talk/Variety, 1982–present
- Watashi ga Ren'ai Dekinai Riyū - Drama, 2011–present
- Welcome to the El-Palacio - Drama, 2011

== X ==
- X - Anime, 2001-2002
- Xam'd: Lost Memories - Anime, 2008–present

== Y ==
- YAT Anshin! Uchū Ryokō - Anime, 1996 - 1998
- Yoru no Yatterman - Anime, 2015–present
- You Gotta Quintet
- Yu-Gi-Oh! - Anime, 1998
- Yu-Gi-Oh! 5D's - Anime, 2008 - 2011
- Yu-Gi-Oh! Arc-V - Anime, 2014 – 2017
- Yu-Gi-Oh! Duel Monsters - Anime, 2000 - 2004
- Yu-Gi-Oh! Duel Monsters GX - Anime, 2004 - 2008
- Yu-Gi-Oh! Sevens - Anime, 2020–present
- Yu-Gi-Oh! VRAINS - Anime, 2017 - 2019
- Yu-Gi-Oh! Zexal - Anime, 2011 - 2012
- Yu-Gi-Oh! Zexal II - Anime, 2012 - 2014
- Yuri on Ice - Anime, 2016
- YuYu Hakusho - Anime, 1992 - 1995

== Z ==
- Za Gaman
- Zatōichi monogatari
- Zenigata Heiji - 1952–present

== See also ==
- Television in Japan
- List of Japanese television dramas
- Japanese television drama
- Japanese science fiction television
- Japanese variety show
