= List of Japanese television programs by date =

The following is a list of Japanese television programs by date of first broadcast in Japan. For an alphabetical list, see: List of Japanese television series.

== 1960s ==
=== 1960 ===
- February 1 – Tetsujin 28-go

=== 1961 ===
- April 3 – Minna no Uta
- May 1 – Instant History

=== 1962 ===
- June 25 – Otogi Manga Calendar

=== 1963 ===
- January 1 – Astro Boy
- September 4 – Sennin Buraku
- October 20 – Tetsujin 28-go
- November 7 – 8 Man

=== 1964 ===
- June 7 – Shōnen Ninja Kaze no Fujimaru
- August 3 – Big X

=== 1965 ===
- April 4 – Dolphin Prince
- May 8 – Space Ace
- June 3 – Prince Planet
- June 6 – The Amazing 3
- August 29 – Obake no Q-tarō
- October 6 – Kimba the White Lion

=== 1966 ===
- February 5 – Osomatsu-kun
- March 7 – Marude Dameo
- October 1 – Robotan
- October 5 – New Jungle Emperor: Go Ahead Leo!
- October 6 – Hang On! Marine Kid
- December 5 – Sally the Witch
- December 31 – King of the World: The King Kong Show
- Leo the Lion
- Ninja Hattori-kun Ninja Hattori-kun + Ninja Monster Jippou

=== 1967 ===
- January 7 – Gokū no Daibōken
- April 1 – Ōgon Bat
- April 2 – Perman
- April 2 – Princess Knight
- April 2 – Speed Racer
- April 5 – King Kong & 001/7 Tom Thumb
- October 7 – Oraa Guzura Dado

=== 1968 ===
- January 3 – GeGeGe no Kitarō
- March 30 – Star of the Giants
- April 5 – Cyborg 009
- April 21 – Kaibutsu-kun
- October 2 – Dokachin the Primitive Boy
- October 3 – Sabu to Ichi Torimono Hikae
- October 7 – Yōkai Ningen Bem

=== 1969 ===
- January 6 – Himitsu no Akko-chan
- January 13 – Undersea Boy Marine
- April 2 – Judo Boy
- April 4 – Mōretsu Atarō
- April 6 – Dororo
- April 6 – Kamui the Ninja
- October 2 – Tiger Mask
- October 5 – The Genie Family
- October 5 – Moomin
- October 5 – Sazae-san
- October 7 – Flower Action 009ノ1
- December 7 – Attack No. 1

== 1970s ==
=== 1970 ===
- April 1 – Ashita no Joe
- April 7 – The Adventures of Hutch the Honeybee
- April 13 – Akaki Chi no Eleven
- October 4 – Inakappe Taishō
- October 5 – Norakuro
- November 2 – Mahō no Mako-chan

=== 1971 ===
- January 1 – Hyppo and Thomas
- January 3 – Andersen Monogatari
- January 5 – Daichūshingura
- April 8 – Wandering Sun
- September 25 – Tensai Bakabon
- October 3 – Marvelous Melmo
- October 4 – Sarutobi Ecchan
- October 7 – GeGeGe no Kitarō
- October 24 – Lupin The Third Part I
- September 1 – Shin Obake no Q-tarō

=== 1972 ===
- January 4 – Pinocchio: The Series
- January 9 – New Moomin
- April 1 – Triton of the Sea
- April 3 – Mahōtsukai Chappy
- July 8 – Devilman
- October 1 – Science Ninja Team Gatchaman
- October 4 – Astroganger
- October 5 – Tamagon the Counselor
- October 7 – Dokonjō Gaeru
- December 3 – Mazinger Z

=== 1973 ===
- January 1 – Babel II
- January 2 – Demetan Croaker, The Boy Frog
- January 7 – Fables of the Green Forest
- April 1 – Doraemon
- April 2 – Little Wansa
- September 24 – Edo o Kiru
- October 1 – Miracle Girl Limit-chan
- October 2 – Casshan
- October 3 – Karate Baka Ichidai
- October 4 – Dororon Enma-kun
- October 5 – Aim for the Ace!
- October 13 – Cutie Honey

=== 1974 ===
- January 6 – Heidi, Girl of the Alps
- April 1 – Chargeman Ken!
- April 1 – Majokko Megu-chan
- April 2 – Dame Oyaji
- April 3 – Vicky the Viking
- April 4 – Getter Robo
- April 4 – New Honeybee Hutch
- April 5 – Hoshi no Ko Chobin
- September 8 – Great Mazinger
- October 4 – Ganbare!! Robocon
- October 4 – Hurricane Polymar
- October 5 – First Human Giatrus
- October 6 – The Song of Tentomushi
- October 6 – Space Battleship Yamato
- October 15 – Calimero

=== 1975 ===
- January 5 – Dog of Flanders
- April 1 – Maya the Honey Bee
- April 4 – Brave Raideen
- April 4 – La Seine no Hoshi
- April 5 – Don Chuck Monogatari
- April 7 – Ganba no Bōken
- May 15 – Getter Robo G
- July 2 – Tekkaman: The Space Knight
- October 1 – Arabian Nights: Sinbad's Adventures
- October 3 – Kum-Kum
- October 4 – Time Bokan
- October 5 – Grendizer
- October 5 – Steel Jeeg
- October 6 – The Adventures of Pepero
- October 6 – Ganso Tensai Bakabon
- October 7 – Laura, the Prairie Girl
- October 15 – Ikkyū-san

=== 1976 ===
- January 2 – Huckleberry no Bōken
- January 4 – 3000 Leagues in Search of Mother
- April 1 – Gaiking
- April 4 – Gowappa 5 Gōdam
- April 6 – UFO Warrior Dai Apolon
- April 17 – Chōdenji Robo Combattler V
- April 27 – Piccolino no Bōken
- July 1 – Groizer X
- July 5 – Blocker Gundan 4 Machine Blaster
- September 5 – Magne Robo Gakeen
- October 1 – Candy Candy
- October 1 – Hoka Hoka Kazoku
- October 3 – Little Lulu and Her Little Friends
- October 3 – Paul's Miraculous Adventure
- October 6 – Dokaben

=== 1977 ===
- January 1 – Time Bokan Series Yatterman
- January 2 – Rascal the Raccoon
- February 3 – Jetter Mars
- March 3 – Mechander Robo
- March 6 – Wakusei Robo Danguard Ace
- March 18 – Daitetsujin 17
- April 3 – Ganbaron
- April 4 – Attack on Tomorrow
- April 9 – Chōgattai Majutsu Robo Ginguiser
- June 4 – Chōdenji Machine Voltes V
- June 7 – Monarch: The Big Bear of Tallac
- July 3 – Chojin Sentai Barattack
- September 18 – Ippatsu Kanta-kun
- September 22 – Arrow Emblem: Hawk of the Grand Prix
- October 1 – Shin Kyoujin no Hoshi
- October 1 – Temple the Balloonist
- October 2 – Nobody's Boy: Remi
- October 3 – Lupin III Part II
- October 8 – Invincible Super Man Zambot 3
- October 17 – Dinosaur War Izenborg
- October 29 – Wakakusa no Charlotte
- December 13 – Angie Girl
- December 23 – Yakyū-kyō no Uta

=== 1978 ===
- January 1 – The Story of Perrine
- January 7 – Abarenbō Shōgun
- March 6 – Majokko Tickle
- March 14 – Space Pirate Captain Harlock
- April 1 – Tōshō Daimos
- April 2 – Starzinger
- April 4 – Future Boy Conan
- April 10 – Ikkyū-san
- May 17 – Spider-Man
- June 3 – Haikara-san ga Tōru
- June 3 – Invincible Steel Man Daitarn 3
- July 4 – The Adventures of the Little Prince
- September 14 – Galaxy Express 999
- October 1 – Gatchaman II
- October 3 – The Yagyu Conspiracy
- October 8 – Treasure Island
- October 14 – Shin Ace o Nerae!
- October 14 – Space Battleship Yamato II
- November 7 – Captain Future

=== 1979 ===
- January 7 – Anne of Green Gables
- February 3 – Zenderman
- February 9 – Hana no Ko Lunlun
- March 6 – Cyborg 009
- March 21 – Mirai Robo Daltanious
- April 2 – Doraemon
- April 2 – Josephina the Whale
- April 4 – The Ultraman
- April 7 – Bannertail: The Story of Gray Squirrel
- April 7 – Mobile Suit Gundam
- April 14 – Shin Kyoujin no Hoshi II
- September 9 – King Arthur
- October 6 – Misha
- October 7 – Gatchaman Fighter
- October 7 – Gordian Warrior
- October 9 – Manga Sarutobi Sasuke
- October 10 – The Rose of Versailles
- October 13 – Space Carrier Blue Noah

== 1980s ==
=== 1980 ===
- January 6 – The Adventures of Tom Sawyer
- January 7 – The Littl' Bits
- January 8 – The Wonderful Adventures of Nils
- January 9 – Maeterlinck's Blue Bird: Tyltyl and Mytyl's Adventurous Journey
- February 2 – Invincible Robo Trider G7
- February 2 – Rescueman
- February 4 – Monchhichi Twins
- February 15 – Lalabel
- March 19 – Space Emperor God Sigma
- April 6 – King Arthur: Prince on White Horse
- April 7 – Tsurikichi Sanpei
- April 15 – Zukkoke Knight - Don De La Mancha
- May 8 – Space Runaway Ideon
- June 30 – Space Warrior Baldios
- July 12 – Magical Girl Lalabel: the Sea Calls for a Summer Vacation
- July 16 – Ganbare Genki
- September 2 – Kaibutsu-kun 2
- September 7 – Muteking, The Dashing Warrior
- September 28 – Ojamanga Yamada-kun
- October 1 – Astro Boy
- October 3 – Taiyō no Shisha Tetsujin Nijūhachi-gō
- October 11 – Space Battleship Yamato III
- October 13 – Ashita no Joe 2

=== 1981 ===
- January 4 – The Swiss Family Robinson: Flone of the Mysterious Island
- February 7 – Yattodetaman
- March 1 – Golden Warrior Gold Lightan
- March 4 – Beast King GoLion
- March 6 – Hello! Sandybell
- March 7 – Ohayō! Spank
- April 3 – Ai no Gakko Cuore Monogatari
- April 4 – Dotakon
- April 7 – Belle and Sebastian
- April 7 – Little Women
- April 8 – Dr. Slump - Arale-chan
- April 16 – Queen Millennia
- April 20 – Tiger Mask II
- July 3 – GoShogun
- September 3 – Manga Mito Kōmon
- September 7 – New Dokonjō Gaeru
- September 28 – Ninja Hattori-kun
- October 1 – Superbook
- October 2 – Six God Combination Godmars
- October 3 – Jarinko Chie
- October 4 – Dash Kappei
- October 6 – Galaxy Cyclone Braiger
- October 7 – Honey Honey no Suteki na Bouken
- October 8 – Miss Machiko
- October 14 – Urusei Yatsura
- October 23 – Fang of the Sun Dougram
- Sabu to Ichi Torimono Hikae

=== 1982 ===
- January 10 – Lucy of the Southern Rainbow
- January 25 – Asari-chan
- February 6 – Combat Mecha Xabungle
- February 13 – Gyakuten! Ippatsuman
- March 3 – Armored Fleet Dairugger XV
- March 18 – Magical Princess Minky Momo
- April 5 – Don Dracula
- April 5 – The Flying House
- April 5 – Game Center Arashi
- April 8 – Boku Patalliro!
- April 17 – Thunderbirds 2086
- May 5 – Acrobunch
- May 8 – Little Pollon
- June 29 – The Mysterious Cities of Gold
- July 5 – The Kabocha Wine
- July 6 – Galactic Gale Baxingar
- October 3 – The Super Dimension Fortress Macross
- October 7 – Space Cobra
- October 7 – Robby the Rascal
- October 7 – Tokimeki Tonight
- October 10 –Warrior of Love Rainbowman
- October 12 – The New Adventures of Maya the Honey Bee
- October 13 – Arcadia of My Youth: Endless Orbit SSX

=== 1983 ===
- January 9 – Mirai Keisatsu Urashiman
- January 9 – Story of the Alps: My Annette
- January 10 – Captain
- February 5 – Aura Battler Dunbine
- March 1 – Ai Shite Knight
- March 26 – Fushigi no Kuni no Alice
- March 30 – Lightspeed Electroid Albegas
- March 31 – Miyuki
- April 1 – Armored Trooper Votoms
- April 2 – Nanako SOS
- April 3 – Kinnikuman
- April 3 – Mīmu Iro Iro Yume no Tabi
- April 4 – Mrs. Pepper Pot
- April 4 – Perman
- April 4 – Superbook II
- April 5 – Galactic Whirlwind Sasuraiger
- April 7 – Eagle Sam
- April 9 – Itadakiman
- April 9 – Lady Georgie
- May 20 – Stop!! Hibari-kun!
- June 5 – Plawres Sanshiro
- July 1 – Creamy Mami, the Magic Angel
- July 1 – Serendipity the Pink Dragon
- July 3 – Super Dimension Century Orguss
- July 6 – Psycho Armor Govarian
- July 11 – Cat's Eye
- October 2 – Genesis Climber MOSPEADA
- October 7 – Special Armored Battalion Dorvack
- October 7 – Taotao
- October 10 – Captain Tsubasa
- October 18 – Chōshichirō Edo Nikki
- October 20 – Igano Kabamaru
- October 21 – Ginga Hyōryū Vifam

=== 1984 ===
- February 3 – Chō Kōsoku Galvion
- October 7 – Star Musketeer Bismark
- October 8 – Cat's Eye
- November 6 -"Sherlock Hound"

=== 1985 ===
- April 1 – Shin Obake no Q-tarō
- April 4 – Dancouga – Super Beast Machine God
- April 8 – Bumpety Boo
- July 15 – Dirty Pair: The Original TV Series
- October 3 – Blue Comet SPT Layzner
- October 12 – GeGeGe no Kitarō

=== 1986 ===
- January 6 – Robotan
- January 11 – Kato-chan Ken-chan Gokigen TV
- February 26 – Dragon Ball
- October 6 – Bosco Adventure

=== 1987 ===
- August 31 – 8 Man Has Returned
- October 1 – FNN Date Line
- October 2 – Chibikko Kaiju Yadamon
- October 4 – Norakuro-kun
- October 12 – Oraa Guzura Dado

=== 1988 ===
- January 9 – Himitsu no Akko-chan
- February 13 – Osomatsu-kun
- Ulysses 31

=== 1989 ===
- March 18 – Osomatsu-kun: Suika no Hoshi Kara Konnichiwa Plaisance!
- April 25 – Dragon Ball Z
- October 3 – Downtown no Gaki no Tsukai ya Arahende!!
- October 9 – Sally the Witch 2

== 1990s ==
=== 1990 ===
- January 6 – Heisei Genius Bakabon
- April 21 – Mōretsu Atarō

=== 1991 ===
- November 2 – Marude Dameo
- December 8 – Downtown no Gottsu Ee Kanji

=== 1992 ===
- April 5 – Chōdendō Robo Tetsujin 28-go FX
- October 15 – Calimero

=== 1993 ===
- April 5 – Close-up Gendai
- April 18 – Back to the Giatrus Days

=== 1995 ===
- October 1 – Asayan

=== 1996 ===
- January 7 – GeGeGe no Kitarō
- February 7 – Dragon Ball GT
- April 3 – First Human Gon
- October 2 – Raideen the Superior

=== 1997 ===
- January 7 – Bayside Shakedown
- January 9 – Speed Racer
- April 1 – Pokémon
- April 17 – Dotch Cooking Show
- July 19 – Flame of Recca

=== 1998 ===
- April 5 – Himitsu no Akko-chan
- April 7 – Cardcaptor Sakura

=== 1999 ===
- January 31 – Moero!! Robocon
- October 11 – Ainori
- October 19 – Rerere no Tensai Bakabon

== 2000s ==
=== 2000 ===
- July 1 – Food Fight
- October 8 – Baby Felix

=== 2001 ===
- April 21 – Ashita Ga Arusa
- July 4 – Fighting Girl
- October 6 – Babel II 2 - Beyond Infinity
- October 14 – Cyborg 009: The Cyborg Soldier

=== 2002 ===
- February 4 – Friends
- April 4 – .hack//Sign
- April 8 – Azumanga Daioh

=== 2003 ===
- January 8 – .hack//Legend of the Twilight
- April 15 – Baribari Value
- October 4 – Chouseishin Gransazer

=== 2004 ===
- January 15 – Aim for the Ace!
- April 7 – Tetsujin 28-go
- October 2 – Genseishin Justirisers
- October 5 – Bleach

=== 2005 ===
- January 13 – Fugo Keiji
- March 28 – Evening 5
- April 4 – Attack No. 1
- April 10 – Aikurushii
- April 15 – Doraemon
- July 8 – Dragon Zakura
- October 1 – Chousei Kantai Sazer-X
- November 12 – Gaiking: Legend of Daiku-Maryu

=== 2006 ===
- April 1 – Yōkai Ningen Bem
- April 5 – .hack//Roots
- October 5 – 009-1
- October 5 – Code Geass: Lelouch of the Rebellion

=== 2007 ===
- March 3 – Reideen
- April 1 – GeGeGe no Kitarō

=== 2008 ===
- January 10 – Hakaba Kitarō
- January 14 – Yatterman
- April 6 – Code Geass: Lelouch of the Rebellion R2
- October 1 – AKBingo!

=== 2009 ===
- April 5 – Dragon Ball Kai
- September 5 – Jungle Taitei - Yūki ga Mirai wo Kaeru
- October 12 - Fairy Tail
- November 14 – Gaiji Keisatsu

== 2010s ==
=== 2010 ===
- January 2 – Cobra the Animation: Rokunin no Yuushi
- April 1 - Maid Sama!
- April 17 – Kaibutsu-kun
- July 5 – Asu no Hikari o Tsukame

=== 2011 ===
- April 8 – Dororon Enma-kun Meeramera
- April 17 – Blue Exorcist
- October 22 – Yōkai Ningen Bem

=== 2012 ===
- October 20 – World War Blue

=== 2013 ===
- April 6 – Tetsujin 28-go Gao!

=== 2014 ===
- July 5 – Aldnoah.Zero
- July 6 – Akame ga Kill!
- July 8 – Ai Mai Mi: Mousou Catastrophe
- July 16 – ST Aka to Shirō no Sōsa File
- October 2 – Binta! ~Bengoshi Jimuin Minowa ga Ai de Kaiketsushimasu~
- October 2 – Denkigai no Honya-san
- October 5 - World Trigger
- October 6 – Ai Tenchi Muyo!
- October 6 – When Supernatural Battles Became Commonplace
- October 7 – Akatsuki no Yona
- October 16 – Dear Sister
- October 16 – Yuki Yuna is a Hero

=== 2015 ===
- January 9 – Kaiki Renai Sakusen
- January 10 - The Idolmaster Cinderella Girls
- January 11 – Yoru no Yatterman
- April 9 – Urawa no Usagi-chan
- October 1 - Kami-sama Minarai: Himitsu no Cocotama
- October 5 - One-Punch Man

=== 2016 ===
- January 17 - Kazoku no Katachi
- April 1 - Rage of Bahamut: Manaria Friends
- April - Omukae desu
- April - Sono 'Okodawari', Watashi ni mo Kure yo!!
- July 4 - New Game!
- July 9 - Ultraman Orb
- October 1 - Bloodivores
- October 5 - Cheating Craft
- October 5 - To Be Hero
- October 5 - Yuri on Ice
- October 6 - Keijo!!!!!!!!

=== 2017 ===
- January 5 - Seiren
- January 10 - Kemono Friends
- January 11 - Hand Shakers
- January 12 - Chōyū Sekai
- January - Tokyo Tarareba Musume
- April 1 - The Silver Guardian
- April - Boruto: Naruto Next Generations
- April 8 - Eromanga Sensei

=== 2018 ===
- April 6 - Magical Girl Site

=== TBA ===
- Nyanko Days

== See also ==
- List of Chinese television programs by date
