= Kuramochi =

Kuramochi (written: 倉持) is a Japanese surname. Notable people with the surname include:

- Akira Kuramochi (倉持 明, born 1952), Japanese baseball player
- Asuka Kuramochi (倉持 明日香, born 1989), Japanese idol, singer and actress
- Fusako Kuramochi (倉持 房子, born 1955), Japanese manga artist
- Miho Kuramochi (倉持 美穂, born 1998), Japanese tennis player
- Yuka Kuramochi (倉持 由香, born 1991), Japanese gravure idol, television personality and actress
