= Baribari =

Baribari may refer to:

- Baribari Legend
- Baribari Value
