= Mikumo =

Mikumo may refer to:

- Mikumo, Mie, a former town in Ichishi District, Mie, Japan
- Mikumo Station, a railway station in Konan, Shiga, Japan
- Mikumo Guynemer, a character in the anime series Macross Delta

== People with the surname ==
- Gakuto Mikumo (三雲 岳斗, born 1970), Japanese writer
- Takae Mikumo (三雲 孝江, born 1954), Japanese announcer
