= Call Me Chihiro =

- Promotional release poster
- Japanese: ちひろさん
- Directed by: Rikiya Imaizumi
- Screenplay by: Kaori Sawai; Rikiya Imaizumi
- Based on: Chihiro-san by Hiroyuki Yasuda
- Produced by: Akira Yamano
- Starring: Kasumi Arimura; Hana Toyoshima; Tetta Shimada; Yui Sakuma; Mitsuru Hirata; Jun Fubuki; Lily Franky
- Cinematography: Hiroshi Iwanaga
- Music by: Shigeru Kishida
- Production companies: Asmik Ace; Digital Frontier
- Distributed by: Netflix
- Release date: 23 February 2023 (Japan)
- Running time: 132 minutes
- Country: Japan
- Language: Japanese

Call Me Chihiro (Japanese: ちひろさん, Hepburn: Chihiro-san) is a 2023 Japanese drama film written and directed by Rikiya Imaizumi. Produced under Asmik Ace and Digital Frontier, it stars Kasumi Arimura, Hana Toyoshima, Tetta Shimada, Yui Sakuma, Mitsuru Hirata with Jun Fubuki and Lily Franky. The film was released on Netflix on 23 February 2023.

== Cast ==
- Kasumi Arimura as Chihiro / Aya Furusawa, a former sex worker who now works at a bento shop. Her real name is Aya but Chihiro is her stage name
- Hana Toyoshima as Kuniko Seo / Okaji, a shy girl who secretly takes pictures of Chihiro and later becomes her friend
- Tetta Shimada as Makoto Satake, a young boy who lives with his mother and later becomes Chihiro's friend
- Van as Basil, Chihiro's best friend who falls in love with her former boss and starts working at his aquarium shop
- Ryuya Wakaba as Taniguchi
- Yui Sakuma as Hitomi, Makoto's mother
- Itsuki Nagasawa as Chinatsu Ube, a girl who likes to read manga and one of Chihiro's friends
- Miwako Ichikawa as Chihiro, a woman Chihiro met when she was a child and is the inspiration for her stage name
- Keiichi Suzuki as Tramp
- Toshie Negishi as Nagai
- Mitsuru Hirata as Bito, Tae's husband and the owner of the bento shop where Chihiro works
- Lily Franky as Utsumi, Chihiro's former boss
- Jun Fubuki as Tae, the owner of the bento shop where Chihiro works

== Production ==
The film was announced on Netflix. It is based on the manga series Chihiro-san by Hiroyuki Yasuda. The principal photography of the film took place in Hiroshima, Japan. The trailer of the film was released on 6 December 2022.

== Reception ==
On the review aggregator website Rotten Tomatoes, 75% of 8 critics' reviews are positive.

Brian Costello of Common Sense Media rated the film 4 stars out of 5.

Tatat Bunnag of Bangkok Post, Felix Martua of The Jakarta Post reviewed the film.
