= Takae Mikumo =

Takae Mikumo (三雲 孝江; real name: Takae Hoshi (星 孝江) born April 12, 1954, in Shibuya, Tokyo and raised in Yokohama, Kanagawa) is a newscaster in Japan, a former TBS announcer.

== Appearance program ==
- Evening 5 / JNN Evening News
