= Yuka Kuramochi =

Japanese gravure idol, tarento, and actress (born 1991)

- 倉持 由香
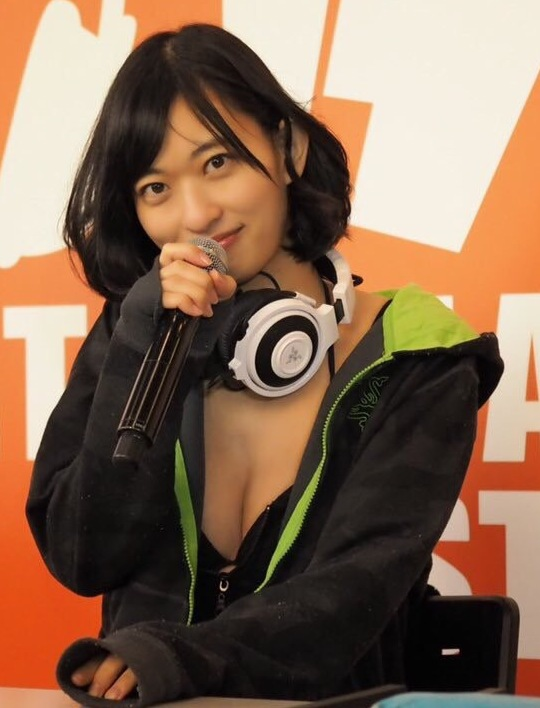
- Kuramochi in February 2015
- Born: 6 November 1991 (age 34); Funabashi, Chiba, Japan
- Other name: Motchī (もっちー)
- Occupations: Gravure idol; tarento; actress
- Agent: G-STAR.PRO
- Height: 167 cm (5 ft 6 in)
- Spouse: Fuudo (m. 2019)
- Children: 1

Yuka Kuramochi (倉持 由香, Kuramochi Yuka; born 6 November 1991) is a Japanese gravure idol, tarento, and actress. She is represented by G-STAR.PRO. Her real name is Minako (未奈子).

== Early life and career ==
Kuramochi was born and raised in Funabashi, Chiba with one older brother. She graduated from high school in March 2010.

She has been writing about her activities in her Livedoor blog as an affiliate of "Tokyo Zukan" as 倉持 結香. However, the blog stopped updating by the end of April 2010. She opened a blog in Ameblo in August of the same year and noted that "Her previous stage name can no longer be used", suggesting that the contract with the "Tokyo Zukan" has ended. She announced her transfer to her current agency in December 2011.

She starred in the film Thallium Shōjo no Dokusatsu Nikki (タリウム少女の毒殺日記), which won the Best Picture award in the Japanese Eyes section at the 25th Tokyo International Film Festival on 20 October 2012. She appeared on the green carpet. She also entered the Rotterdam International Film Festival with the same work. From July 2013 she acted as a "candidate for idol" 2013 candidate (entry No.29). She appeared in Young Animal's 25 January issue of 2013, in which she appeared on the "Please Take a Picture!" series.

She perform PR activities of the film Rush and Escape Plan as Gradol Movie Propaganda Department from June 2014 along with Saki Suzuki. From July 2016 it was announced that she became a regular of AbemaTV's Doyō no Yoru wa Shiriagari Variety: Peachannel. In August 2016, she became a new member of "Umagi People" at "Umabi" established by the Japan Racing Association (JRA), and made a brilliant betting ticket with a superb ballad in the Kitakyushu Memorial. In the end of December 2016 at AbemaTV's Suppin Mājan, she won the championship and got a prize of a million yen.

On 24 March 2017, it was announced that she participated as a judge of Miss iD 2018. In the monthly prize held on 16 April 2017, she made three triplets and got one million betting tickets. She hit three consecutive singles in the Queen Elizabeth Cup, Oaks, etc. She had won seven times with a total of a million tickets by the end of May 2017. At the Japanese Derby held on 28 May 2017, she also tried again three times, the six games of the "Umabi People" to control the G1 prediction battle from the Osaka Cup to the derby, and a superb wedge Shined in the queen. In the Yasuda Memorial Meeting held on 4 June 2017, she tried triple and single triplets, and got a total of 325,500 yen.

== Personal life ==
In November 2019, Kuramochi announced her marriage with fighting game player Fuudo. On 1 June 2021, she gave birth to her first child, a boy named Minato (湊).

== Filmography ==
=== Television ===
- FNN Super News (CX)
- Broad Caster (TBS)
- Evening 5 (TBS)
- Radio de Culture (NTV)
- Tokyo Game Zukan (EX Entertainment)
- Piroron Gakuen (NTV)
- Mayonaka no Obaka Sawagi! (CTC, Tokyo MX)
- Aggressive desukedo, Nanika? (Home)
- Barairo Dandy (Tokyo MX)
- Shiseikatsu Mukidashi Variety "Kiriuri $ Idol" (Tokyo MX)
- Yoasobi Sanshimai (NTV, 6 Dec 2012)
- Zenryoku-zaka (EX, 21 Dec 2012)
- Idol no Ana 2013 (NTV, 2013 #1–#8)
- NexT (NTV, 13 Jul 2013)
- Tokyo Himajin (NTV, 30 Aug, 6 Sep 2013)
- Mayonaka no Obaka Sawagi! (Tokyo MX, Dec 2013 – Mar 2014) – regular
- Tsubo Musume (TBS, 19 Mar 2014)
- Nobunaga (CBC, 22 Mar 2014)
- Ariyoshi's Meeting for Reviewing (NTV, 20 Apr 2014)
- Tokyo Present Night (CX, 6 May 2014)
- Nakai no Mado: 2-Jikan SP (NTV, 6 Aug 2014)
- Tokyo Himajin (NTV, 15 Aug 2014)
- Goddotan (TX, 8 Oct 2014)
- Ariyoshi Japon (TBS, 7 Nov 2014)
- All-Star Champion Bowling 6th Battle (CS Fuji TV One, 18 Nov 2014)
- Eiga 'Parasyte' Tettei Kaibō Special (NTV, 22 Nov 2014)
- Shin Nippon Puroresu Dai Sakusen DX (CS Samurai Channel, 3 Dec 2014)
- Megami Kōrin (Mondo TV, 30, 31 Jan 2015)
- Soreike! Game Panther! (NTV, 12, 19 Feb 2015)
- Shibata to Yukai na Nakamatachi (BS Asahi, 1 Mar 2015) – MC assistant
- Goddotan (TX, 23 Apr 2015)
- Yoroi Bijo (Fuji TV One, 9 Jun 2015)
- Tsuiseki! Tsubuyaki Watcher (NTV, 27 Jun 2015)
- Hama-chan ga! (NTV, 2, 15 Jul 2015)
- Down Town DX (NTV, 12 Nov 2015)
- NMB48 Ririka Suto no Mājan Gachi Battle! (5 Dec 2015, TBS Channel 1)
- Girls Champion Bowling 2015 (CS Fuji TV One, 15 Dec 2015)
- Dokkiri wa Drama no ato de (EX, 30 Dec 2015)
- Ebisu no Zukai no Kyōten (TX, 5 Jan 2016)
- Hama-chan ga! Guam SP (NTV, 21, 28 Jan, 4, 11, 18 Feb 2016)
- SS (Tokyo MX, Jan–) – MC
- Pu' Suma (EX, 8 Apr)
- Manami Hashimoto no Osenaka Nagashimashou ka? (Tokyo MX, 14 Apr)
- Chō Ponkotsu Summers (TX, 14, 21, 28 May 2016)
- Yarisugi! Pinpon Daikō-sha (EX, 18 Jun 2016)
- Academy Night (TBS, 9, 23 Aug 2016)
- King-chan (TX, 19, 26 Sep, 3, 10 Oct) – MC assistant
- Goddotan (2 Oct 2016, TX)
- Onegai! Ranking (EX, 15 Mar 2017)
- Update Daigaku (EX, 15, 22 Mar 2017)

=== Internet television ===
- Doyō no Yoru wa Shiriagari: Peachannel (AbemaTV, 16 Jul 2016 –) – MC assistant
- Kaere ma 10 (AbemaTV, 17 Jul 2016)
- Sabeshinbo Night (AbemaTV, 29 Jul 2016)
- Kinkyū Tokuban! Pokémon Go (AbemaTV, 31 Jul 2016)
- Ude wa aru no ni Yoba renaikara Katte ni Eigyō shimasu in Fujikyū (AbemaTV, 20 Aug 2016) – MC
- Otona Onagokai (AbemaTV, 7 Sep 2016)
- K-1 World GP Chokuzen Tokuban Bangumi (AbemaTV, 15 Sep 2016)
- Dai Ikkai Geinin Mājan Grand Prix (AbemaTV, 9 Oct 2016)
- Suppin Mājan (AbemaTV, 30 Dec 2016)
- Hiphop Channel Kaikyoku Tokuban! (AbemaTV, 1 Jan 2017) – MC
- Yuji Ayabe no Real Jinsei sugo ro ku (AbemaTV, 3 Jan 2017) – MC assistant
- Onegai! Manpincon (AbemaTV, 8, 15 Mar 2017) – MC
- 2 Yoru Renzoku! Shadow Bath Saikyō Kettei-sen (AbemaTV, 19, 20 Apr 2017) – MC
- Suppin Mājan presents Gachinko Datsui Mājan (AbemaTV, 22 Apr 2017) – Production concurrently
- TakaToshi no Variety daro ka!! (AbemaTV, 1 May 2017)
- Koki Kameda ni Kattara 1000 Man-en (7 May 2017, AbemaTV) – ringside reporter
- Gokuraku tonbo: KakeruTV (1 Jun 2017, AbemaTV)
- Hissatsu! Bakarhythm Jigoku (23 Jun 2017, AbemaTV)
- Gokuraku tonbo: KakeruTV –Combi Sumou Saikyō Kettei-sen 3h Special– (6 Jul 2017, AbemaTV)
- Sumaho Game no Kōshien ga Kaimaku! Zenkoku Kōkōsei Shadow Bath Senshuken Special Tokuban (20 Aug 2017, AbemaTV) – MC

== Radio ==
- Miho Takagi close to you (NCB)
- Tsuka Kin Friday (Fuji TV Podcast)
- Tama Musubi (TBS Radio)
- Damedame Radio Tenshi no Okotoba (NHK Radio 1)
- Bay Line Go! Go! (Bay FM)*performed on behalf of Ai Nishida as Thursday DJ
- The Bay Line (Bay FM)*performed on behalf of Ai Nishida as Thursday DJ
- Shiggy Jr. no All Night Nippon 0 (NBS/24 Aug 2015)

== Internet ==
- Game Dōjō (13 Jul 2011 – Ustream)
- GēPara (Feb 2012 – BibibiTV Niconico Channel Thursdays)
- Gura Suta! Banban (Apr 2012 – Sky Clad TV)
- Kuramochi×Harada no Joshi Dōga (3 Sep 2012 – Gura Suta! Channel)
- Men's Cyzo Kuramochi×Harada no Joshi Dōga [Nama] no Column (Updated Mondays)
- Shakai-ha Tōron Variety 'Ikusa': Oppai vs Oshiri (25 Mar 2014)
- HangameLive (27 Mar 2014)
- Schola Channel*quasi-regular (2 Apr 2014)
- sabra net
- Yuka Kuramochi o Shirita〜i Gravure Kōsatsu-bu (Kari) Broadcast every other Wednesday
- goo Ima Topi*irregular column
- Yuka Kuramochi no Gravure Kaitai Shinsho*total of five times in a column
- Hot-Dog Press (Kodansha)
- Shūkan Georgia (application for smartphone)
- TGS2014 War Gaming Japan Sensha yameru tte yo (21 Sep)
- Rooftop
- Gamer Gravure Idol Interview G-Tune × Yuka Kuramochi | G-Tune
- Ura-gao TV! G-Tune X Indies Game
- Ultra Story Fighter IV: Kadō Zenjitsu ni Play-shi Night!
- Ultra Story Fighter IV Update Tokuban!: Tsuyu nante Futtoba sa Night
- Yuka Kuramochi no Uchihime Nikki 01
- [Gradol vs Tsukuru Onna?!] Kono Kikaku o yara sero! Yuka Kuramochi-chan Saki Yoshida-chan mo Sansen
- Nikkan Spa!
- TeleAsa Dōga Akapen Takigawa-sensei no nan demo Koi ya!
- Dynamites na G-Tune de Morimori ikou
- Gurunabi Date
- Kurosama Kansha-sai: 24-jikan Namahōsō
- Gekkan Trekuru ch
- Icarus Online
- CyberAgent Booth@Tataka Kaigi 2015[Day 1]
- Megami Kōrin 'Shiri Shokunin' Kuramochi ga Tōjō/Raisha PR
- Game 'Kyōkai no Kuro Tsubasa: Assault Raven' Play Dōga
- e Iyahon TV Gradol Kōrin! Yuka Kuramochi-san Sei Shutsuen de Razor Tokushū!
- Minna de Sodateru Idol-bu: Bukatsu Do
- [Sengoku Ixa] Hangame×mixi Platform Taikō-sen Event-sei Chūkei!
- Tōron Varietyu "Ikusa": Model vs Idol: Mizugi no Juyō ga aru no wa dotchi?
- DDon TV #3–Seishiki Service Kaishi Chokuzen SP
- [Matsudo Keirin] FI Fantasy Night Race: Sapporo Beer Star Cup
- Anri to Asuka no Are!? 8-Ji (TeleAsa Dōga LoGirl, 17 Feb 2016)
- Weekly Playboy×KawaiianTV Tonikaku Akarui Yasumura Presents! Zenrappoi Gravure Senshuken
- Kuramochi Yoshida no Yuruttoaso-bu
- Saikyō Momo Tetsu Player o Taose! Momotarō Dentetsu 16 Hokkaidōdai Idō no Maki Kōhen (10 Oct 2016)
- Yuka Kuramochi no Gradol Quest (NamaTele, 14 Oct 2016 –)
- Tute no Mayonaka ni Yaritaikoto! (8 Nov 2016, 360Channel) – "Beautiful Woman and Paranoia Closed-door Date" #2 Yuka Kuramochi · Appeared in practical editing of delusive closed-room dating "Yuka Kuramochi"
- Gradol Delivery Hako (Distribution started in 2016, 360Channel)
- Goddotan "Idol Nomi Sugata Kawaii SP" (dTV, 9 Jan 2017)
- Mobile Suit Gundam Battle Operation Next 2 Shūnenkinen: Tokubetsu Kikaku: Custom Match-sei Haishin: Tōzai Pro Gamer Sansen! (4 Aug 2017, BandaiChannel) – MC

=== Music videos ===
- Baroque - Tatoeba Kimi to Boku
- Amour MiCo -Tobikomi Eigyō Onēsan- Eigyō 3-ka Yuka Kuramochi
- Doburokku – Moshikashite dakedo, music video DVD

=== Films ===
- Shin Ten nenkajū Sayaka (2010, Starring: Rui Kiriyama, Director: Daigo Udagawa) – as Sora Aoiki ASIN B00329NWBU
- Thallium Shōjo no Dokusatsu Nikki (released 6 Jul 2013, Director: Yutaka Tsuchiya) – Lead role: as Thallium Girl
- Death Forest: Kyōfu no Mori 2 (released 21 Mar 2015, Director: Masataka Ikken) – Lead role: as Kizuki
- Ninja JaJaMaru-kun (release date determined, Director: Ainosuke Shibata) – Heroine: as Sakurahime
- Kai Neko (released 1 Apr 2016, Director: Takashi Kaneda) – Lead role: as Mīko
- Kūga no Shiro: Joshi Keimusho (released 26 Mar 2017, Director: Wataru Oku) – Lead role: as Rio Wakamura

=== Direct-to-video ===
- Working Dead: "Tokuni Mendōkusai" Hataraku Zombie-tachi (8 Apr 2015, Amuse Soft Entertainment)
- Dragon of the Fallen –Fighting Tile of Inversion– Chapter 2 (7 Jul 2017)

=== Stage ===
- Alice in Project Time-Space Police Wecker χ Wandering Etranze (20–24 Jun 2012, Rikkōkai Hall)
- Cornflakes 11th performance Goodbye Shakespeare!!! (4–9 Jun 2014, Nakameguro Kinko Theater)
- Super Dangan Rompa 2: The Stage2017 (16–26 Mar 2017, Zepp Roppongi Blue Theater) – as Mikan Tsumiki

=== Advertisements ===
- Escap Ganbaru Hitobito Roppongi (SSP)
- Hakusensha Ishakoi Web CM (Hakusensha)
- Yuka Kuramochi×G-Tune Web Dōga 15-byō 30-byō-hen A-B-E-D (Mouse Computer)
- Georgia Shūkan Georgia CA-hen (Coca-Cola)
- Valkyrie Connect Valcian Girls Web CM (Ateam)
- Speed Breath Care Honki Binta (Kobayashi Pharmaceutical)

=== Video games ===
- RPG Maker Fes (delivered 16 Nov 2016, Kadokawa Games) – Nintendo 3DS. Produced "Gradol Quest".
- Ranoge Tsukūru (delivered 12 Jun 2017, Kadokawa Games) – Smartphone application. Produced "Replay".
- 100 Man-ri no Winning Post (29 Aug 2017, Koei Tecmo Games) – Smartphone game. Held collaboration event.

== Works ==
=== Digital photo albums ===
- Kidō Shōjo KuraYuka (Nov 2006/Tokyo Graphic Entertainment) (as 倉持 結香)
- Yuka Kuramochi A+2 (5 Dec 2014/DMM.com)
- Yuka Kuramochi no Joshi kōsei to wa Nanigoto ka (Ilogos)
- 3-Nen B-gumi Shiri Deka Sensei (Ilogos)
- Shirigami (Ilogos)
- Otona no Gyōmu Meirei (Ilogos)
- Ima: Shiri o Omou (Line Communications)

=== DVD ===
- Kuramochi Yuka. (15 May 2007, Tokyo Graphic Entertainment) (as 倉持 結香)
- Mainichi Kuramotchi (31 Mar 2013, BNS)
- Mōsō Material (28 Jun 2013, Spice Visual)
- Kuramochiī Shiri (6 Dec 2013, E-Net Frontier)
- Panchu (15 Mar 2014, Picoche)
- Momojiri Kanojo (20 Jun 2014, Line Communications)
- Īnarimotchi Shiiku Nikki (25 Sep 2014, E-Net Frontier)
- mis*dol: Miseta garina Kanojo (19 Dec 2014, M.B.D Media Brand)
- Taiwan Okonattara Omoinohoka, iroiro Hatten Shi sugi chatta Kudan (25 Mar 2015, Wani Books)
- Momojiri Kanojo 2 (20 Jun 2015, Line Communications)
- Momojiri Zanmai (20 Oct 2015, Line Communications)
- Renai Immigration (18 Feb 2016, Guild)
- Momojiri Kanojo 4 you (20 May 2016, Line Communications)
- Kuramochi Sense (25 Aug 2016, Air Control)
- Koi no Report (20 Jan 2017, E-Net Frontier)

=== Blu-ray ===
- Momojiri Kanojo 2 (20 Jun 2015, Line Communications)
- Momojiri Zanmai (20 Oct 2015, Line Communications)

== Bibliography ==
=== Photo albums ===
- Tokyo Shiri Hyakkei (27 May 2014, Futabasha, Shooting: Masafumi Nakayama) ISBN 978-4575306750
- Taiwan Kyōi-teki Bijiri-shū (27 Nov 2014, Wani Books, Shooting: Masafumi Nakayama) ISBN 978-4847047053
- Cosplay Jigadori-bu: Photo Bible Gambit (6 Jun 2015, Gambit, Shooting: Yuji Suzaki) ISBN 978-4907462222
- Funaba shiri (12 Sep 2015, Gakken Marketing, Shooting: Kazunori Fujimoto) ISBN 978-4056109139
- Yoroi Bijo (26 Oct 2016, Pony Canyon) ISBN 978-4865292329
- Iyana Kao sa renagara o Pants Misete moraitai Shashin-shū (29 Sep 2017, Ichijinsha, Shooting: Yuki Aoyama) ISBN 978-4758015776
