= Hana Toyoshima =

Japanese actress (born 2007)

- 豊嶋 花
- Born: March 27, 2007 (age 19); Tokyo, Japan
- Occupation: Actress
- Years active: 2012–present
- Agent: Stardust Promotion
- Known for: Call Me Chihiro; Bullet Train Explosion

Hana Toyoshima (Japanese: 豊嶋 花) (born March 27, 2007) is a Japanese actress. She is known for her role as Kuniko Seo in Call Me Chihiro and as Yuzuki Onodera in Bullet Train Explosion. After working with C&T (Carrot) and Smile Monkey, Toyoshima is now affiliated with Stardust Promotion's Production Division 1.

== Career ==
=== Early career ===
Hana Toyoshima began her entertainment career in 2008 at the age of one. At five years old, she auditioned for the movie Black Dawn (released in 2012), where because her role had no spoken lines, expressive acting was highly important. Her charming appearance and mature acting skills were highly praised, earning her attention as the second Mana Ashida.

In 2012, she appeared in the NHK morning drama Doctor Ume. In 2013, she played the childhood version of Mine Yokoi, daughter of Kakuma Yamamoto, in the NHK historical drama Yae's Sakura. After that, she portrayed the young Haruko Amano. In the June 2013 in the movie Midsummer's Equation, she portrayed the childhood version of Narumi Kawabata played by actress Anne Watanabe. She further increased her popularity when she played the young version of the heroine Meiko Uno, also portrayed by Anne Watanabe, in her third morning drama appearance, Bon Appetit! starting in October 2013.

In November 2013, she was chosen as the campaign character for "TRF Easy Do Dancercise", showcasing her dance skills in a dance cover video. In 2017, she played the young version of Tetsuko Kuroyanagi in the TV Asahi daytime drama Totto-chan!. In spring 2019, she entered junior high school, "graduated" from the children's talent agency Smile Monkey, and moved to Stardust Promotion.

=== Netflix works ===
In 2023, she played Kuniko Seo aka Okaji in Call Me Chihiro, and in 2025, she played as Yuzuki Onodera in Bullet Train Explosion. Both movies were Netflix-produced.

== Filmography ==
=== Film ===
Year	Title	Role	Notes	Ref.
2012	Black Dawn	Kotomi		
2013	Midsummer's Equation	Narumi Kawabata (young)		
2017	A Loving Husband	Emi Inoue		
2019	Mentai-piriri	Eiko		
2019	Little Miss Period	Karin		
2020	School Meals Time Final Battle	Mako Fujii		
2021	Tom and Sawyer in the City	Miharu Horikoshi		
2022	Fuyuko's Summer	Fuyuko	Lead role; short film	
2023	Call Me Chihiro	Kuniko Seo		
2025	Bullet Train Explosion	Yuzuki Onodera		
2026	Matched: True Love	Aira Ito		
2026	Till We Meet Again on the Starry Hill	Sara		
2027	Even If My Prayers Go Unanswered, I Have Something to Tell You	Nazuna Tsuyukusa	Lead role	

=== Television ===
Year	Title	Role	Notes	Ref.
2012	Doctor Ume	Ikuyo Nakai	Asadora	
2013	Amachan	Haruko Amano (young)	Asadora	
2013	Bon Appetit!	Meiko Uno (young)	Asadora	
2013	Yae's Sakura	Yamamoto Mine (young)	Taiga drama	
2017	Totto-chan!	Tetsuko Kuroyanagi (young)		
2021	My Dear Exes	Uta Omameda		
2023	What Will You Do, Ieyasu?	Tane	Taiga drama	
2023	Barakamon	Miwa Yamamura		
2025	The Reluctant Preacher	Iroha Naito		
