= Tsuyoshi Kusanagi =

Japanese talento

Tsuyoshi Kusanagi 草彅 剛
- Kusanagi in 2020

Background information
- Born: July 9, 1974 (age 52)
- Origin: Seiyo, Ehime, Japan
- Genre: J-pop
- Occupations: Actor, singer, television host
- Years active: 1987–present
- Label: Johnny & Associates
- Member of: Atarashii Chizu
- Formerly of: SMAP

Tsuyoshi Kusanagi (草彅 剛, Kusanagi Tsuyoshi; born July 9, 1974 in Seiyo, Ehime, Japan) is a Japanese actor, singer, television host, and a former member of SMAP, one of the best-selling boy bands in Asia.

== Early life ==
Kusanagi grew up in Kasukabe, Saitama, Japan.

== Career ==
=== Music ===
In 1987, at age 13, Kusanagi auditioned to enter Johnny & Associates, a Japanese talent agency that recruits and trains young boys, preteens to teens, to become singers and members of boy bands. After five of the other band members auditioning individually from 1986 through 1987, in autumn 1987, twenty boys, from ages ten to seventeen, were put together into a group called The Skate Boys, which was initially created as backup dancers for a famous boy band, Hikaru Genji. In April 1988, producer Johnny Kitagawa chose six out of the twenty boys to create a new boy band and named them "SMAP".

A year after the dissolution of SMAP, Kusanagi, alongside former members Shingo Katori, and Goro Inagaki formed the group, Atarashii Chizu.

=== Acting ===
He had the lead role in the movie, Yomigaeri (黄泉がえり) (January 18, 2003; a Japan public presentation). Moreover, his Korean-language-Japanese-produced movie The Hotel Venus (ホテルビーナス, Hoteru Bīnasu) (March 6, 2004 Japan public presentation) was submitted to the Moscow International Film Festival on June 25, 2004.

In 2020, Kusanagi took on the role of Nagisa, a transgender nightclub worker in Eiji Uchida's Midnight Swan. The film won numerous awards, such as Picture of the Year, and he was subsequently awarded the Japan Academy Film Prize for Outstanding Performance by an Actor in a Leading Role.

=== Television ===
As a member of the boyband SMAP, Kusanagi used to co-host the weekly variety show SMAP×SMAP alongside his bandmates for 20 years. In 2001, he hosted the variety show Chonangang on Fuji TV. Determined to debut in Korea, Kusanagi started learning the Korean language and appearing on Korean variety shows. This focus on Korean culture led to him adopting Chonangang as his Korean persona in various SMAP concerts, even releasing several singles. Originally, Chonangang was intended to focus on Kusanagi's journey in South Korea, however lasted eight years due to its popularity. Because of the show's success, the format shifted to feature interviews with popular Korean celebrities such as Lee Min-ho, and led to Kusanagi interviewing former South Korean Presidents Roh Moo-hyun, and Lee Myung-bak on TBS.

== Personal life ==
Kusanagi announced his marriage on December 30, 2020.

=== Arrest ===
On April 23, 2009, at around 3 a.m., Kusanagi was arrested on suspicion of public indecency at Akasaka, Minato, Tokyo. On April 24, 2009, he held a press conference accompanied by his attorney and apologized for his misbehavior. Prosecutors decided not to indict Kusanagi because of his apology. He took a one-month-long hiatus and returned to the taping of SMAPxSMAP on May 28, 2009.

== Filmography ==
=== Film ===
Year	Title	Role	Notes	Ref.
1994	Shoot!	Kamiya Atsushi	Lead role	
1995	The Diary of Anne Frank	Peter (voice)		
1999	Messengers	Hironori Suzuki	Lead role	
2000	Séance	Fumio Hayasaka		
2003	Yomigaeri	Heita Kawada	Lead role	
2004	The Hotel Venus	Chonan	Lead role	
2004	The Taste of Tea	Projectionist	Cameo appearance	
2004	Nin x Nin: Ninja Hattori-kun, the Movie	Man	Cameo appearance	
2006	Sinking of Japan	Toshio Onodera	Lead role	
2006	Like a Virgin	Japanese teacher	Cameo appearance	
2007	The Adventures of Super Monkey	Fake Sha Wujing	Cameo appearance	
2008	My Darling of the Mountains	Tokuichi	Lead role	
2008	I Want to Be a Shellfish	Saburo Onishi	Cameo appearance	
2009	Ballad	Matabe Ijiri	Lead role	
2011	1,778 Stories of Me and My Wife	Sakutarō Makimura	Lead role	
2012	A Ghost of a Chance	Teruo Hosho		
2012	Dearest	Yuji Tamiya		
2012	Care Worker Gang	Hikoichi Tsubasa	Lead role	
2013	Maruyama, the Middle Schooler	Tatsuo Shimoi	Lead role	
2015	Attack on Titan	Grisha	Cameo appearance	
2015	Attack on Titan End of the World	Grisha	Cameo appearance	
2018	The Bastard and the Beautiful World	Osamu	Anthology film	
2019	Makuko	Koichi Nagumo		
2019	The Stormy Family	Kotetsu Suzuki	Lead role	
2020	Midnight Swan	Nagisa	Lead role	
2022	Sabakan / Summer Days 1986			
2024	Bushido	Yanagida Kakunoshin	Lead role	
2024	At the Bench		Lead role; anthology film	
2025	Bullet Train Explosion	Kazuya Takaichi	Lead role	
2026	It's All Bananas!		Lead role	

=== Television (as actor) ===
Year	Title	Role	Notes	Ref.
1988–1989	Abunai Shonen III	Himself	Main role	
1989	Jikan desuyo Heisei Gannen	Hattori		
1992–1993	Hime-chan's Ribbon	Koichi Shikura / Himself (voice)		
1995	Inochi Uruwashiku	Daisuke Tsugawa		
1995	Tsuki Uma-ya Oen Jikencho	Seinosuke Ikeda		
1995	Ienakiko 2	Tsuyoshi Kuroiwa		
1995	Mada Koi wa Hajimaranai	Hiroshi Ochiai		
1995	Thursday Ghost Stories: Himitsu no Nakama	Shinichi Imamura	Main role	
1996	Nagoya Yomeiri Monogatari 8	Ichiro Hiraoka		
1996	Kekkon Shiyouyo	Jyunya Sugimura		
1996	Delicious Relations	Kazuma Kimura		
1997	Boku ga Boku de Arutame ni	Etsuro Mizoguchi	Main role	
1997	Sasho Taeko	Sadatsugu Yurioka		
1997	Ii Hito	Yûji Kitano	Main role	
1997	Gift	Yûji Kitano	Guest appearance; episode 7	
1997	Tales of the Unusual: Mujitsu no Otoko	Ichiro Kawashima	Main role	
1997	Narita Rikon	Ichiro Hoshino	Main role	
1998	Sensei Shiranaino?	Yûsaku Kinoshita	Main role	
1998	Jinbē	Shin Teranishi		
1999	Furuhata Ninzaburo vs SMAP	Himself	Main role	
1999	Bakayaro 1999: Sekuhara de Karasawagi suruna	Masato Yamaguchi	Main role	
1999	Séance	Fumio Hayasaka		
1999–2003	Team	Yûsuke Kazami	Main role	
2000	Tales of the Unusual: Jû Otoko	Tarō Tanaka	Main role	
2000–2001	Food Fight	Mitsuru Ihara	Main role	
2001	Tales of the Unusual: Jûsanbanme no Kyaku	Kenichirō Honda	Main role	
2001	Star's Love	Sûsuke Nakata	Main role	
2002	Saranheyo	Chonan Kan	Main role	
2003	Boku no Ikiru Michi	Hideo Nakamura	Main role	
2003	Taikōki: Saru to Yobareta Otoko	Toyotomi Hideyoshi	Main role	
2004	Shinsengumi!	Enomoto Takeaki	Taiga drama	
2004	Kaikyō wo Wataru Violin	Jin Chang Heryern	Main role	
2004	X’smap	Master	Main role	
2004	Tokugawa Tsunayoshi: Inu to Yobareta Otoko	Tokugawa Tsunayoshi	Main role	
2005	Koi ni Ochitara	Shimao Suzuki	Main role	
2005	Chiisana Untenshu	Yōhei Takanashi	Guest appearance	
2005–present	PythagoraSwitch	Himself (voice)		
2006	Ai to Shi wo Mitsumete	Minoru Kōno	Main role	
2006	Boku no Aruku Michi	Teruaki Ōtake	Main role	
2008	Suzuki Fusai no Jingi naki Tatakai	Lawyer	Cameo appearance; episode 1 and 2	
2008	Ryokiteki na Kanojo	Saburō Masaki	Main role	
2009	Yume wo Kanaeru Zou	Fumio Fumiyama (voice)	Main role	
2009	Crayon Shin-chan	Matarō (voice)	Guest appearance	
2009–2011	Care Worker Gang	Hikoichi Tsubasa	Main role	
2010	99 Years of Love: Japanese Americans	Chōkichi Hiramatsu / Ichirō Hiramatsu	Main role	
2011	Fuyu no Sakura	Tasuku Inaba	Main role	
2012	37sai de Isha ni natta Boku	Yûta Konno	Main role	
2012	Tales of the Unusual: Hate Virus	Makoto Saeki	Main role	
2013	Aji Ichi Monme	Yoshito Takuma	Cameo appearance	
2013	Kami-sama no Beret	Osamu Tezuka	Main role	
2013	Dokushin Kizoku	Mamoru Hoshino	Main role	
2013–2016	Specialist	Yoshito Takuma	Main role	
2014	Honto ni Atta Kowai Hanashi: Hannin wa Dare da	Kenta Misawa	Main role	
2014	Sazae-san	Himself (voice)	Guest appearance; episode 7148	
2015	Zeni no Sensou	Tomio Shiraishi	Main role	
2015	Shin Naniwa Kinyudo	Tomio Shiraishi	Guest appearance	
2017	Uso no Sensou	Kōichi Ichinose	Main role	
2021	Reach Beyond the Blue Sky	Tokugawa Yoshinobu	Taiga drama	
2022	Peperoncino	Kiyoshi Onodera	Main role	
2022	Lost Man Found	Takeshi		
2023	War of Traps	Washizu Toru	Main role	
2023	Tales of the Unusual: Eien no Futari	Hajime Sakamoto	Main role	
2023	Deaf Voice	Naoto Arai	Main role	
2023–2024	Boogie Woogie	Zen'ichi Hatori	Asadora	

=== Television (as personality) ===
Year	Title	Role	Notes
1994–2014	Waratte Iitomo	Himself	
1995–1996	Tamori’s The World of Music	Himself	
1996–1997	Oh! El Club	Himself (host)	
1996–2016	SMAP×SMAP	Himself (host, chef, performer)	
1997	Scratch	Himself (host)	
1997–2005	Dotch Cooking Show	Himself	
1998	Muchu Sengen Ganbarimasu	Himself (host)	
1998–2018	Pussma	Himself (host)	
2001–2003	Chikyu Fushigi Daishizen	Himself (narrator)	
2001–2010	Chonan Kan	Himself (host)	
2003–2016	Tsuyoshi Kusanagi’s Ganbatta Taishou	Himself (host)	
2004–2014	Bokura no Ongaku	Himself (host)	
2005	24 Hour Television	Himself (host)	Telethon
2005–2014	FNS Music Festival	Himself (host)	TV special; 15 episodes
2007–2016	Baby Smap	Himself (host)	
2012–2014	FNS Music Fes. In Summer	Himself (host)	TV special; 3 episodes
2014–2015	SmaShip	Himself (host)	TV special; 2 episodes
2015–2024	Bura Tamori	Himself (narrator)	
2022-2025	Waruiko Atsumare	Himself (host, performer)	2 episodes in 2021; 1 episode in 2022; become a regular show from April 2022
2022-present	Kusanagi Yasutomo no Usagi to Kame	Himself (host)	4 episodes in 2021; become a regular show from May, 2022

=== Web program ===
Year	Title	Role	Notes
02-05/11/2017	72 Hour Honne TV	Host	
01/01/2018	27 Hun Hon no chotto TV	Host	
30-31/01/2018	72 Hun mou chotto TV - Shingo Katori Birthday Special	Himself	Appeared on phone
May, 2018-present	7.2 Atarashii Betsu no Mado	Himself (host, performer)	
16/09/2018	Namie Amuro Densetsu's Live Video Revival: WE ▼NAMIE FINAL Encore LIVE	Host	
2019-2021	Nagisuke!	Host	With Yusuke Santamaria

=== Japanese dub ===
Year	Title	Role	Notes	Ref.
2005	Robots	Rodney	Lead role	
2007	Strings	Hal	Lead role	
2018	Mutafukaz	Angelino	Lead role	

=== Radio ===
Year	Title	Role	Notes
1994–2016	Ohayo SMAP	Himself	
1995–present	SMAP POWER SPLASH → ShinTsuyo POWER SPLASH	Himself	Changed to "ShinTsuyo POWER SPLASH" since 2017

=== Theatre ===
Year	Title	Role	Notes
1991	Saint Seiya	Dragon Shiryū	Lead role
1992	Dragon Quest	Atlas	Lead role
1993	Another	Shunichi	Lead role
1993	Hime-chan's Ribbon	Daichi Kobayashi	Lead role
1995	Haisenkoku no Ōji: Fortinbras	Taketoshi Hanezawa	Lead role
1999–2000	Kamata Koshin-kyoku	Yasuji Muraoka	Lead role
2002	Readers theater: La Dame aux Camélias	Himself	Lead role
2006	Chichi Kaeru	Kenichirō Kuroda	Lead role
2008	Mabuta no Haha	Chûtarō	Lead role
2010	K2	Taylor	Lead role
2012–2013	Boku ni Honou no Sensha wo	Naoki Yanagihara	Lead role
2013	Nito Monogatari	Sukune	Lead role
2015	burst!	Himself	Lead role
2018	Ballyturk	Man 1	Lead role
2018	Musical Drama: La Strada	Zampano	Lead role
2019	Family Story PART1	Nakaji Nobuhiro	Lead role
2021	Family Story PART1	Nakaji Nobuhiro	Replay
2020	Musical Drama: The rise of Arturo Ui	Arturo Ui	Lead role
2021-2022	Musical Drama: The rise of Arturo Ui	Arturo Ui	Replay
2022	burst!	Himself	Replay

== Publications ==
- Kore ga Boku desu. (April 1997) ISBN 978-4847012792
- Okiraku (March 2007) ISBN 978-4048944892
- Kusanagiron (May 2008) ISBN 978-4087804942
- Okiraku 2 (March 2016) ISBN 978-4047317321
- Jeongmal Book (December 2002) ISBN 978-4838714254
- Jeongmal Book Hangul (December 2002) ISBN 978-4838714186
- Jeongmal Book 2 (November 2004) ISBN 978-4838715589
- Jeongmal Book 2.5 (November 2004) ISBN 978-4838715596
- Tsuki no Machi Yama no Machi (February 2011) ISBN 978-4847019647
- Document Kusanagi Tsuyoshi in Yomigaeri (2003) ISBN 978-4048535755
- The Hotel Venus Starring Kusanagi Tsuyoshi (2004) ISBN 978-4048537353
- Nippon Chinbotsu Photo Book featuring Kusanagi Tsuyoshi (2006) ISBN 978-4048539807
- Yama no Anata Tokushi no Koi (2008) ISBN 978-4087804959
