= Gaiji Keisatsu (film) =

- Directed by: Kentarō Horikirizono
- Written by: Ryota Kosawa
- Based on: Gaiji Keisatsu by Iku Asō
- Starring: Atsurō Watabe; Kim Kang-woo; Yōko Maki; Machiko Ono; Min Tanaka; Im Hyeon-jun; Kenichi Endō; Kimiko Yo; Ryo Ishibashi; Toshiyuki Kitami; Kenichi Takito; Shibukawa Kiyohiko
- Cinematography: Kazunori Soma
- Edited by: Shinichi Suzuki
- Music by: Shigeru Umebayashi
- Release dates: May 23, 2012 (Japan Filmfest Hamburg); June 2, 2012 (Japan)
- Running time: 128 minutes
- Country: Japan

Gaiji Keisatsu (外事警察, Gaiji keisatsu), also known in English as Black Dawn, is a 2012 Japanese film directed by Kentarō Horikirizono and based on a novel by Iku Asō.

== Cast ==
- Atsurō Watabe as Kenji Sumimoto (Nihongo: 澄本健二, Sumimoto Kenji)
- Kim Kang-woo as An Min-cheol (Hangul: 안민철, An Min-cheol/Nihongo: アン・ミンチョル, An Minchoru)
- Yōko Maki as Kaori (Nihongo: かおり, Kaori)
- Machiko Ono as Hina Matsuzawa (Nihongo: 松沢ひな, Matsuzawa Hina)
- Min Tanaka as Masayoshi Jo (Nihongo: 城正義, Jō Masayoshi)
- Im Hyung-joon as Kim Jeong-soo (Hangul: 김정수, Gim Jeong-su/Nihongo: キム・ジョンス, Kimu Jonsu)
- Kenichi Endō as Toshiki Kurata (Nihongo: 倉田俊樹, Kurata Toshiki)
- Kimiko Yo as Kumi Muramatsu (Nihongo: 村松久美, Muramatsu Kumi)
- Ryo Ishibashi as Shotaro Ariga (Nihongo: 有賀章太郎, Ariga Shōtarō)
- Toshiyuki Kitami as Ryoga Kanazawa (Nihongo: 金沢良賀 Kanazawa Ryōga)
- Kenichi Takito as Shoma Hisano (Nihongo: 久野昌磨, Hisano Shōma)
- Shibukawa Kiyohiko as Takuya Morinaga (Nihongo: 森永拓也, Morinaga Takuya)
- Hana Toyoshima as Kotomi (Nihongo: ことみ, Kotomi)
- Lee Kyeong-Yeong as Choi Kil-Sun (Chosongul: 최길선, Choe Gil-seon/Nihongo: チェ・ギルソン, Che Giruson), a North Korean terrorist
- Park Won-sang as North Korean defector broker source
- Kim Eung-soo as Park Jong-sik (Hangul: 박종식, Bag Jong-sig/Nihongo: パク・ジョンシク, Paku Jonshiku)
- Kim Jae-Il as soldier

== Production ==
The film was shot in Chiba, Japan and in Seoul and Busan, South Korea.

== See also ==
- Gaiji Keisatsu
