= Gochisōsan =

Television series

- Also known as: Bon Appetit!
- Genre: Drama
- Written by: Yoshiko Morishita
- Directed by: Takafumi Kimura; Tetsuya Watanabe; Yoshiharu Sasaki
- Starring: Anne Watanabe; Masahiro Higashide; Naomi Zaizen; Taizō Harada; Midoriko Kimura; Mitsuki Takahata; Masato Wada; Aki Maeda; Tsuyoshi Muro; Yoshiko Miyazaki; Kazuko Yoshiyuki; Masaomi Kondō
- Narrated by: Kazuko Yoshiyuki
- Opening theme: "Ame Nochi Hallelujah" by Yuzu
- Composer: Yoko Kanno
- Country of origin: Japan
- Original language: Japanese
- No. of episodes: 150

Production
- Running time: 15 minutes
- Production company: NHK Osaka

Original release
- Network: NHK
- Release: September 30, 2013 – March 29, 2014

Gochisōsan (ごちそうさん), released in some countries as Bon Appetit!, is a Japanese television drama series. It first aired from 30 September 2013 to 29 March 2014. It is scripted by Yoshiko Morishita, who wrote such dramas as Jin, and stars Anne Watanabe as Meiko Uno, a woman who lives through the Taisho and Shōwa eras and tries to excel at Japanese cuisine. Meiko is the daughter of parents who run a western style restaurant in Tokyo. She marries, moves to Osaka with her husband, and experiences cultural differences between Tokyo and Osaka, as she lives as a mother and wife in Osaka. It is the 89th NHK Asadora.

Watanabe and Higashide, the leads, would go on to marry in real life. The word gochisōsan is an informal version of gochisōsama, a term used to thank a host or a cook for a meal.

== Cast ==
=== Main characters ===
- Anne Watanabe as Meiko Nishikado (her maiden name was Uno)
  - Hana Toyoshima as young Meiko Uno
- Masahiro Higashide as Yūtarō Nishikado, Meiko's husband
  - Ryūnosuke Hosoda as young Yūtarō Nishikado
- Miyabi Matsuura as Fuku Nishikado, Meiko's daughter
  - Tomoka Harami as young Fuku Nishikado
- Masaki Suda as Taisuke Nishikado, Meiko's son
  - Ryūto Misawa as young Taisuke Nishikado
- Daigo Nishihata as Katsuo Nishikado, Meiko's son
  - Teruo Ninomiya as young Katsuo Nishikado

=== Uno family ===
- Kazuko Yoshiyuki as Tora Uno, Meiko's grandmother (also as narrator)
- Naomi Zaizen as Iku Uno, Meiko's mother
- Taizō Harada as Daigo Uno, Meiko's father
- Kai Inowaki as Teruo Uno, Meiko's brother
- Chiemi Matsutera as Kuma

=== Nishikado family ===
- Masaomi Kondō as Shōzō Nishikado, Yutaro's father
  - Masahiro Kobori as young Shōzo Nishikado
- Yoshiko Miyazaki as Shizu Nishikado
  - Saki Furuwa as young Shizu Nishikado
- Midoriko Kimura as Kazue Yamashita (her maiden name was Nishikado), Yutaro's older sister
- Mitsuki Takahata as Noriko Kawakubo (her maiden name was Nishikado), Yutaro's younger sister and Keiji's wife
  - Yura Arata as young Noriko Nishikado

=== Others ===
- Yasuhi Nakamura as Umasuke Takagi
- Takashi Yamanaka as Kosai Muroi, Sakurako's husband and Meiko's friend
- Aki Maeda as Sakurako Muroi (her maiden name was Horinohata), Kosai's wife
- Abe Yohana as Ayame Muroi, Kosai and Sakurako's eldest daughter
  - Akira Sugimoto as young Ayame Muroi
- Akiko Kimata as Tatsuko Takagi, Umasuke's sister
- Mai Miyajima as Tamiko Nogawa, Meiko's friend
- Kaoru Okumeki as Mrs. Miyamoto
- Masato Wada as Genta Izumi, Meiko's childhood friend
- Ai Kato as Akiko Matsuda
  - Kotoko Noda as young Akiko Matsuda
- Ippei Shigeyama as Keiji Kawakubo, Noriko's husband
- Henry Fowler as Kansai dialect-speaking GHQ interpreter

== International broadcast ==
- Indonesia, Myanmar, Singapore, Thailand, Taiwan, Sri Lanka, Mongolia and Vietnam: aired every Monday to Saturday on WakuWaku Japan under the title Bon Appetit!. The broadcast rights for the drama were sold to Sri Lanka with the intention of dubbing it into Sinhalese.
- Iran: aired every night on Tamasha TV under the title Bon Appetit! (Persian: نوش جان, romanized: Nush-e Jân).
- Jamaica: premiered on CVM Television in 2017.
- Malaysia: broadcast through TV Alhijrah.
- Thailand: aired every Saturday to Sunday on Thai PBS under the title Best Woman, Best Chef (Thai: ยอดหญิงยอดเชฟ, romanized: Yɔ̂ɔt Yǐng Yɔ̂ɔt Chéep).

Preceded by Amachan	Asadora; 30 September 2013 – 29 March 2014	Succeeded by Hanako to Anne
