= Bullet Train Explosion =

2025 Japanese film by Shinji Higuchi

- Film poster
- Directed by: Shinji Higuchi
- Screenplay by: Kazuhiro Nakagawa; Norichika Ōba
- Based on: The Bullet Train by Ari Kato, Ryunosuke Ono, and Junya Sato
- Produced by: Kota Ishizuka
- Starring: Tsuyoshi Kusanagi; Kanata Hosoda; Non; Takumi Saitoh; Machiko Ono; Jun Kaname; Hana Toyoshima
- Cinematography: Yusuke Ichitsubo; Keizō Suzuki
- Edited by: Kaori Umewaki; Atsuki Sato
- Music by: Taisei Iwasaki; Yuma Yamaguchi
- Production company: Episcope
- Distributed by: Netflix
- Release date: 23 April 2025
- Running time: 134 minutes
- Country: Japan
- Language: Japanese

Bullet Train Explosion (Japanese: 新幹線大爆破, Hepburn: Shinkansen Daibakuha; lit. 'The Shinkansen's Big Explosion') is a 2025 Japanese action thriller film directed by Shinji Higuchi and starring Tsuyoshi Kusanagi, Kanata Hosoda, Non, Takumi Saitoh, Machiko Ono, Jun Kaname and Hana Toyoshima. A sequel to the 1975 film The Bullet Train, the film premiered on Netflix on 23 April 2025.

== Plot ==
An H5 Series Shinkansen operating the Hayabusa 60 service to Tokyo departs Shin-Aomori under first-line manager Kazuya Takaichi. Shortly after departure, someone contacts JR East headquarters claiming a bomb has been planted aboard the train and will explode if its speed falls below 100 km/h. To prove the threat, a similar bomb is detonated on a nearby freight train, prompting JR East to halt all trains on the Tōhoku Shinkansen line and clear the route for Hayabusa 60. Driver Chika Matsumoto is ordered to bypass all stations while maintaining 120 km/h.

The bomber initially demands ¥100 billion from the people of Japan in exchange for the passengers' lives. The government refuses, citing its policy of not negotiating with terrorists. When Takaichi is ordered to reveal the emergency to the passengers, panic and distrust spread. The bomber then uses a broadcast signal intrusion to air footage of the bomb being planted on national television.

The crisis worsens when a southbound train stalls at Morioka after a bird strike, forcing Hayabusa 60 onto the northbound track. Dispatcher Yuichi Kasagi calculates a route that avoids the stalled train, but Hayabusa 60 strikes the rear car of another northbound train without derailing. On board, millionaire influencer Mitsuru Todoroki launches an online crowdfunding campaign to raise the ransom, while politician Yuko Kagami attempts to exploit the crisis to repair her damaged reputation.

TMPD Inspector Kawagoe and his team identify the attack as a copycat of the 1975 Hikari 109 incident. Meanwhile, two livestreamers confront disgraced businessman Masayoshi Goto over an accident involving one of his tour helicopters. Their confrontation becomes a fight, leaving Goto unconscious.

Kasagi devises a plan to evacuate the passengers without stopping Hayabusa 60. The crew will disconnect its final two cars and create a temporary bridge to a rescue train. After tools are delivered by the ALFA-X, the rear cars are evacuated and uncoupled. They slow down and explode, seemingly confirming that the bombs were there, but the crew suspects additional explosives and continues without stopping.

Most passengers are transferred to the rescue train, but high school student Yuzuki Onodera goes missing after becoming separated from her classmates. Goto later goes on a suicidal rampage before Kagami calms him. When the rescue train's emergency brake activates, the bridge collapses and seriously injures assistant manager Fujii. Nevertheless, almost everyone is evacuated, leaving Takaichi, Fujii, Matsumoto, Kagami, Todoroki, Goto, and Onodera aboard Hayabusa 60.

At Tokyo Station, workers begin connecting JR East's Tōhoku line with JR Central's Tokaido Shinkansen to extend the train's route. Onodera then calls her father, Tsutomu, and reveals that she is the bomber. She kills him with a similar bomb before informing JR East that the detonators are linked to a heart monitor implanted in her body, meaning she must die for the explosives to be defused.

Kawagoe discovers that Tsutomu was among the officers who attempted to arrest Masaru Koga, a perpetrator of the Hikari 109 incident. Although Koga killed himself when police surrounded his hideout, authorities claimed Tsutomu had shot him in self-defense, portraying him as a hero who saved the Shinkansen industry. With help from Koga's son, Masatoshi, Onodera planned the copycat attack to destroy her abusive father's reputation and discredit the Shinkansen.

The government orders JR East to halt the rail extension. Masatoshi tells police that the remaining bombs are in cars 1, 4, and 6. Kasagi devises a plan to divert the front six cars onto a branch where they can safely explode while using timed track switches to separate the final two cars. Matsumoto leaves the controls and joins the remaining passengers and crew in the rear cars, which are successfully disconnected but derail. The front six cars slow and explode.

Rescue workers recover the survivors from the wreckage, and Kawagoe arrests Onodera. He also reveals that Todoroki's fundraiser reached its goal. The remaining passengers bow to Takaichi, while JR East workers congratulate him and Matsumoto for their efforts.

== Cast ==
=== Hayabusa 60 ===
- Tsuyoshi Kusanagi as Kazuya Takaichi, the head manager of Hayabusa 60
- Kanata Hosoda as Keiji Fujii, the rookie assistant train manager of Hayabusa 60
- Non as Chika Matsumoto, the driver of Hayabusa 60
- Machiko Ono as Yuko Kagami, a female politician on board Hayabusa 60
- Jun Kaname as Mitsuru Todoroki, a YouTuber and millionaire influencer on board Hayabusa 60
- Hana Toyoshima as Yuzuki Onodera, a high school student on board Hayabusa 60
- Daisuke Kuroda as Kodai Hayashi, Kagami's secretary on board Hayabusa 60
- Satoru Matsuo as Masatoshi Goto, former president of a travel company on board Hayabusa 60
- Suzuka Ohgo as Sakura Ichikawa, the homeroom teacher of Onodera's class on board Hayabusa 60
- Naomasa Musaka as Keizo Shinohara, a type 1 electrician on board Hayabusa 60

=== Outside people ===
- Onoe Matsuya II as Yuki Fukuoka, a rescue vehicle driver
- Kenji Iwaya as Yoshiharu Kawagoe, a detective
- Kentaro Tamura as Kentaro Sasaki, senior advisor to the Prime Minister
- Pierre Taki
- Bandō Yajūrō as Shigeru Suwa, chief cabinet secretary
- Takumi Saitoh as Yuichi Kasagi, general commander
- Yasumasa Oba as Shinnosuke Yoshimura, general manager
- Takaya Aoyagi as Mukai, transport dispatcher at Ōmiya
- Yōji Tanaka as Hajime Shinjo

== Production ==
Unlike the original film, production for Bullet Train Explosion received support from the East Japan Railway Company, which provided actual Shinkansen units and railway facilities for filming.

== Reception ==
On the review aggregator website Rotten Tomatoes, 66% of 32 critics' reviews are positive. Metacritic, which uses a weighted average, assigned the film a score of 63 out of 100, based on five critics, indicating "generally favorable" reviews.

Todd Gilchrist of Variety wrote, "For multiple generations of audiences weaned on the first film's downstream successors, Higuchi's follow-up may prove too straightforward or classy to elicit the same excitement. But Bullet Train Explosion feels like a blockbuster made for adults — or let's say, not for a lowest-common-denominator audience — where the priority is throwing challenges and complications at smart characters instead of sparking conflict with cheap narrative shortcuts and bad, even dumb choices."

Simon Abrams of RogerEbert.com gave the film three out of four stars and wrote, "With Bullet Train Explosion, you get a straight-down-the-line crowdpleaser, replete with duty-bound authority figures in well-pressed uniforms, anxious and often self-absorbed passengers, Macgyver-like problem-solving, seat-of-your-pants close calls, that sort of thing. There are no real surprises here, just what you'd want from this sort of cheeseball entertainment."
