= The Hotel Venus =

- Theatrical poster
- Directed by: Hideta Takahata
- Written by: Tetsuro Aso
- Starring: Tsuyoshi Kusanagi; Miki Nakatani; Teruyuki Kagawa; Park Jung Woo
- Cinematography: Venus Pictures
- Distributed by: Shochiku; Asmik Ace Entertainment
- Release date: September 10, 2004
- Running time: 125 minutes
- Country: Japan
- Language: Korean
- Box office: $5,910,042

The Hotel Venus (Korean: 호텔 금성, Japanese: ホテル ビーナス) is a 2004 Korean-language Japanese drama film directed by Hideta Takahata. It was released on March 6, 2004 in Tokyo, Japan, and in South Korea on September 10, 2004. At the Cannes Film Market in France it was released May 14, 2004.

== Synopsis ==
In a strange world there is a secret hotel behind a shabby diner called the Venus Café, harbouring some unusual people where compelling secrets lie in each resident's heart—torturing secrets that have broken their emotional boundaries in the past. In this bittersweet, heart-wrenching story, there is a man by the name of Chonan (Tsuyoshi Kusanagi) who lives in the attic and works as a waiter or handyman at the hotel. Room 1 is shared by two residents: an alcoholic doctor named Doctor (Teruyuki Kagawa), and Wife (Miki Nakatani), who used to be a nurse but now works as a hostess living in the hope of Doctor's recuperation. In Room 3 lives a bubbly girl by the name of Soda (Jo Eun Ji), who came from a deserted town where no one's flowers flourished and who has a dream to open her own flower shop. Finally, Room 4 is occupied by a challenging young boy by the name of Boy (Lee Joon-gi), who carries around a gun longing to become a strong man and who wishes to become a hitman some day. Then there is the owner of the café, Venus, a mysterious transvestite with one bad leg.

Late one day, a drifter by the name of Gai (Park Jung Woo), a quiet man who avoids verbal communication, walks into the Venus Café with a little girl named Sai (Heui Ko To) who never smiles. He tells Chonan the secret password to entering the hidden hotel, and they become the residents of Room 2.

Gai later gets a job at a construction site, while Chonan perseveres in comforting Sai, encouraging her to open up her heart; in the process he finds his own heart slowly opening as well. Boy, who wants to become a strong man, doesn't like Gai staying at the hotel and in the midst of things he gets into a fight with Gai, challenging him to show his worth as a strong man. But in the process he ends up shooting Sai in the leg, handicapping her. In addition, Soda who is usually bubbly later becomes sad due to the illegal errands she has run for her boss at the flower shop. But Chonan eventually discovers Soda's illegal errands and confronts her, reminding her of the differences between right and wrong. Meanwhile, Doctor and Wife are constantly fighting over their petty differences and Doctor's alcoholism, which later causes Wife to leave in depression.

== Cast ==
- Tsuyoshi Kusanagi - Chonan
- Miki Nakatani - Wife
- Teruyuki Kagawa - Doctor
- Park Jung Woo - Gai
- Heui Ko To - Sai
- Jo Eun-ji - Soda
- Lee Joon-gi - Boy
- Masachika Ichimura - Venus
- Masato Ibu
- Takashi Matsuo - flower shop owner
- Masanobu Katsumura
- Yoji Tanaka - policeman A
- Pete Plum - duster
- Rizumu Kaneko - Chonan's lover
- Ji Hyun-woo - policeman

== Awards ==
- Perspectives - Hideta Takahata (26th Moscow International Film Festival)

== Production credits ==
- Director: Hideta Takahata
- Screenplay: Tetsuro Aso
- Executive Producers: Chihiro Kameyama, Yasushi Shiina, Teruo Saegusa, Junichi Sakomoto
- Supervisors: Toru Ota, Takashi Ishihara, Nobuhisa Shimizu, Takeo Hisamatsu
- Producers: Yasushi Ogawa, Kuga Maeda, Masao Teshima, Yuichiro Eto
- Director of Photography: Jun Nakamura
- Production Designer: Yuji Tsuzuki
- Lighting Director: Katsutoshi Hirano
- Sound Mixer: Takashi Nishida
- Editor: Hideta Takahata
