= Akira Kuramochi =

Japanese baseball player

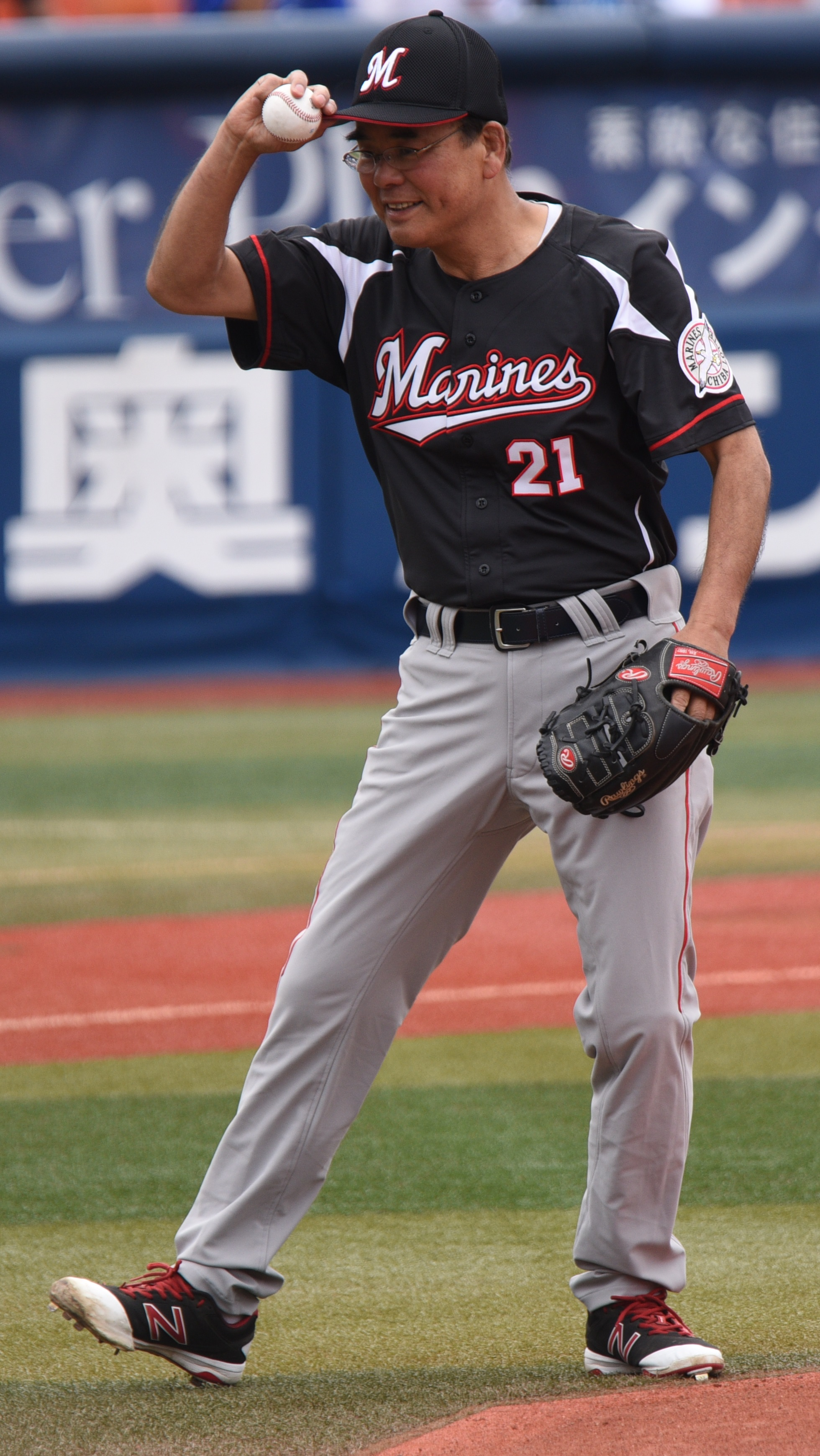
- Pitcher
- Born: July 20, 1952 (age 73); Yokohama, Kanagawa, Japan
- Batted: Right Threw: Right

NPB debut
- 1972, for the Lotte Orions

Last NPB appearance
- 1983, for the Yakult Swallows

NPB statistics (through 2005)
- Win–loss record: 17-21
- Saves: 40
- ERA: 3.40
- Strikeouts: 251
- Stats at Baseball Reference

Teams
- As player: Lotte Orions (1972–1976, 1979–1982); Crown Lighter Lions (1977–1978); Yakult Swallows (1983)

Career highlights and awards
- 1x NPB All-Star (1980)
- Last updated on: 11 February 2014

Akira Kuramochi (倉持 明, Kuramochi Akira; born July 20, 1952) is a former Nippon Professional Baseball pitcher.

Asuka Kuramochi, his daughter, is one of the members of female idol group AKB48.
