= Marude Dameo =

Media franchise

丸出だめ夫
- Manga
- Written by: Kenji Morita
- Published by: Kodansha
- Magazine: Weekly Shōnen Magazine
- Original run: 1964 – 1967
- Television drama
- Studio: Toei Company
- Original network: NTV
- Original run: March 7, 1966 – February 27, 1967
- Episodes: 52
- Anime television series
- Directed by: Akira Shigino
- Produced by: Kenji Shimizu (Fuji TV); Koji Kaneda (Fuji TV); Kyotaro Kimura (Yomiko); Ken Hagino (Studio Pierrot)
- Written by: Yoshio Urasawa
- Music by: Yusuke Honma
- Studio: Studio Pierrot
- Original network: FNS (Fuji TV)
- Original run: November 2, 1991 – September 26, 1992
- Episodes: 47

Marude Dameo (丸出だめ夫) is a Japanese manga series written and illustrated by Kenji Morita (森田拳次). The series stars an elementary school boy named Dameo Marude (丸出 だめ夫, Marude Dameo), the son of a genius scientist who has little success with anything he tries, and a robot created by his father named Borot (ボロット, Borotto), which is good with housekeeping. It was serialized in the Kodansha magazine Weekly Shōnen Magazine from 1964 to 1967. A tokusatsu adaptation by Toei Company aired on Nippon Television from March 7, 1966, to February 27, 1967, for 52 episodes; young actor Pepe Hozumi played the title character. An anime adaptation by Studio Pierrot ran on Fuji Television from November 1991 to September 1992 for The 47 episodes.
