= Dynamic China =

Television documentary series

Dynamic China (激流中国, Gekiryū Chūgoku) is an NHK documentary television series of "specials" covering contemporary China. The series first aired in April 2007 with a prologue followed by the first episode on consecutive nights. The programs come out at irregular intervals, the first were in April, as mentioned, May, and June; the fourth is scheduled for August.

Topics covered include China's ageing society and problems with water shortages.

The series' kanji name is a keyword detectable by China's internet control system.
