= Kazoku no Katachi =

- Genre: Drama
- Created by: Noriko Goto
- Directed by: Shunichi Hirano; Masahiro Sakai; Ayato Matsuda
- Starring: Shingo Katori; Juri Ueno; Kiko Mizuhara; Jun Fubuki; Toshiyuki Nishida
- Theme music composer: Takashi Omama; Shu Kanematsu
- Opening theme: Unpredictable Story by ellie
- Country of origin: Japan
- Original language: Japanese
- No. of episodes: 10

Production
- Producers: Choru Han; Atsushi Sato
- Running time: 54 minutes Sundays at 21:00 (JST)

Original release
- Network: TBS
- Release: January 17 – March 20, 2016

Kazoku no Katachi (家族ノカタチ; English title: The State of Union) is a 2016 Japanese television drama created by Noriko Goto, starring Shingo Katori, Juri Ueno, Kiko Mizuhara, Jun Fubuki and Toshiyuki Nishida. It premiered on TBS on Sundays at 21:00 (JST) from January 17, 2016 to March 20, 2016.

== Cast ==
- Shingo Katori as Daisuke Nagasato
- Juri Ueno as Hanako Kumagai
- Kiko Mizuhara as Rina Tanaka
- Jun Fubuki as Ritsuko Kumagai
- Toshiyuki Nishida as Yozo Nagasato
- Yoshiyoshi Arakawa as Shoichi Sasaki
- Yudai Chiba as Haruto Irie
- Kanako Yanai as Satori Yamane
- Hyoga Takada as Kota Nagasato
- Anne Nakamura as Aya Kozue
- Alisa Mizuki as Mika Ono
- Kei Tanaka as Kazuya Takase
- Leo Morimoto as San Shige
- Yoko Asaji as Misayo Nagasato
- Miki Mizuno as Megumi Nagasato
- Mariya Nagao as Yuka Koyama

== Episodes ==
No.	Original air date	Episode title	Romanized title	Director	Ratings (%)
1	January 17, 2016	結婚しない息子と娘vs超破天荒な父と母	Kekkon shinai musuko to musume vs chō hatenkōna chichi to haha	Shunichi Hirano	9.3%
2	January 24, 2016	元夫はストーカー⁉︎俺の城に危機迫る!	Motoo wa sutōkā? ︎Ore no shiro ni kiki semaru!	Shunichi Hirano	9.0%
3	January 31, 2016	亡き母からオヤジと息子へ最後の贈り物	Naki haha kara oyaji to musuko e saigo no okurimono	Masahiro Sakai	10.3%
4	February 7, 2016	再婚をしたい元夫と奇妙な三角関係勃発	Saikon o shitai Motoo to kimyōna ~ Sankaku kankei no boppatsu	Ayato Matsuda	9.9%
5	February 14, 2016	結婚式前夜に離婚!?父母が結ぶ夫婦の絆	Kekkonshiki zen'ya ni rikon!? Fubo ga musubu fūfu no kizuna	Shunichi Hirano	8.6%
6	February 21, 2016	オヤジおまえもか…後妻は結婚詐欺師!?	Oyaji omae mo ka… gosai wa kekkon sagi-shi!?	Masahiro Sakai	8.6%
7	February 28, 2016	オヤジがダメな女と再婚した本当の理由	Oyaji ga damena on'na to saikon shita hontō no riyū	Ayato Matsuda	8.0%
8	March 6, 2016	オヤジが死ぬ理由	Oyaji ga shinu riyū	Shunichi Hirano	7.6%
9	March 13, 2016	あいつと一緒にいたい理由	Aitsu to issho ni itai riyū	Masahiro Sakai	8.9%
10	March 20, 2016	オヤジに聞かすプロポーズ	Oyaji ni kikasu puropōzu	Shunichi Hirano	9.6%
(Viewing rates are examined by Video Research in Kantō region)

Preceded by Shitamachi Rocket; October 18, 2015 – December 20, 2015	TBS Sunday Dramas; Sundays 21:00 – 21:54 (JST)	Succeeded by 99.9: Keiji Senmon Bengoshi; March 27, 2016 -
