= Dotch Cooking Show =

Japanese cooking show

- Dotchi no Ryōri Shō
- Created by: Yomiuri Telecasting Corporation
- Starring: Hiroshi Sekiguchi and Yuji Miyake
- Country of origin: Japan

Production
- Production companies: Yomiuri Telecasting Corporation; How Full's

Original release
- Network: NNS (YTV)
- Release: April 17, 1997 – March 17, 2005

The Dotch Cooking Show (Japanese: どっちの料理ショー, Hepburn: Dotchi no Ryōri Shō) (April 17, 1997 – March 17, 2005) was a Japanese cooking show produced by the Yomiuri Telecasting Corporation and known for its use of the highest quality and most expensive food ingredients available from both domestic and international sources. In the show two chefs prepare two competing dishes, each using a special premium ingredient, but the dish that is ultimately served at the end of the show is determined by majority vote of the panelists, and then served only to those who voted for that dish. The show is continued by the New Dotch Cooking Show (新どっちの料理ショー, Shin Dotchi no Ryōri Shō) from April 14, 2005.

== Format ==
Each of the two hosts, Hiroshi Sekiguchi (関口宏) and Yuji Miyake (三宅裕司), chooses a particular dish for the contest, and oversees the dish's creation by his chef. For most of the show's run, Sekiguchi was in charge of the Red kitchen, and Miyake took the Yellow kitchen. In later episodes, the two dishes were pre-selected, and whichever meal Sekiguchi and Miyake prepared for his side was determined by a special dice throw. The competing dishes were typically from the same category; an example of a typical "battle" would be miso ramen versus salt-and-butter ramen. Other battles have included miso-based dishes versus mayonnaise-based dishes, chocolate fondant cake versus fruit tart, and even tacos versus spring rolls.

The seven guests would be asked to choose which meal they would most like to eat. Unlike Iron Chef, where the judges would get to eat the food prepared by both chefs, only the guests who chose the winning dish were allowed to eat. There were three periods when the guests would vote; the first was when the dishes were announced, the second was after the "tasting time", and the third was after both dishes had been completed. Though Sekiguchi and Miyake would be allowed to taste the dishes in progress and describe what they had eaten (often in dramatic fashion), the guests were allowed only one "tasting time", where they got a sample of each kitchen's special ingredient, usually prepared in a manner similar to how it would be for the finished product. In the later episodes of the show, the tasting time was eliminated for all but one of the guests. The lucky guest, who was randomly chosen, would be allowed the samples as previously described, and would then have to describe what they tasted to the other guests. As a result, they would be the only one asked to choose the dish they wanted during the second voting. This was done to increase the suspense for the TV audience and put the guests on the same level as the audience.

While the chefs were preparing their dishes, each side would reveal a special ingredient that they hoped would sway the guests to vote for their respective dishes. The special ingredients could be anything from the focus of the recipe, such as a meat or vegetable, to a sauce or flavoring component. Though most of the special ingredients were found in often remote areas of Japan, some came from outside Japan, such as Mongolia, Korea, and even Scotland. In very rare and unusual instances, the special ingredients were not food items, but rather tools for preparing or serving the dish, such as a granite bowl from Korea, used in the preparation of stone-cooked bibimbap, or a special cast iron press used to make taiyaki. Each kitchen's special assistant would go to where the special ingredient was grown/raised/manufactured/harvested, to both procure the special ingredient and observe how it was produced.

At the end of the show, the two hosts would declare in unison: "Kon'ya no gochūmon wa dotch? (今夜の御注文はどっち？; Which dish will you order for tonight?)" The word "Dotch (どっち, Dotchi)", which appears in the show's graphics, is a transliteration of the Japanese word meaning "which one". The guests would press a button (corresponding to which dish they chose) and the side with the most votes was declared the winner. The winning host would then ask the loser to withdraw (撤收, tesshū). The losing host and his chef would then take away their losing dish, and the winning guests and host would then dine on their selection. The hungry losers would watch the winners eat. This would often be followed by a scene of the winning host and guests leaving the show set satisfied after their meal, a scene of the losing host and guests griping about not getting to eat as they left the studio, or sometimes both. At the very end of the show, the losing chef would typically be shown eating his dish alone, wondering why he did not win.

Since each side had to prepare food for eight people (seven guests and the winning host, in the event of a complete 7–0 victory (later nine portions for seven guests, the winning host, and the assistant for the winning kitchen) and typically fewer than that number would actually get to eat, any food left over after the winners had eaten was usually consumed by the show's crew. Since each show usually took hours to film, the hunger expressed by the losing guests at the end was genuine.

== Attendants ==
- Sekiguchi's Kitchen
  - Sekiguchi Hiroshi
  - Sekiguchi's Assistant: Sosuke Sumitani (炭谷宗佑, an announcer at Nippon TV)
  - Sekiguchi's Chef
  - Sekiguchi's Mascot: DOTCHkun (ドッチくん) - Voiced by Aya Hara (原亜弥)

[Later episodes of The New Dotch Cooking Show: Keisuke Mori (森圭介, an announcer at Nippon TV) becomes the new assistant]

- Miyake's Kitchen
  - Miyake Yuji
  - Miyake's Assistant: Ken Shimizu (清水健, an announcer at Yomiuri TV)
  - Miyake's Chef
  - Miyake's Mascot: WHICHkun (WHICHくん)- Voiced by Yuuko Mita (三田ゆう子)
- Regular guest: Tsuyoshi Kusanagi (草彅剛)
- 6 other guests, usually famous Japanese entertainers or athletes.

The assistants reported, newscaster-style, on the obtaining of special ingredients. The chefs were hired from a pool of highly skilled cooks.

== The New Dotch Cooking Show ==
The format of the show is basically the same, except that tasting time has been completely eliminated for the contestants (Sekiguchi and Miyake still get to taste the works in progress). The contestant roster was expanded from 7 to 11 (occasionally 9), with 4 celebrity contestants (Tsuyoshi Kusanagi still appeared as a regular) and 7 (occasionally 5) additional contestants, called "Hara-Helicopters", drawn from a pool. Typically, the Hara-Helicopters are everyday people, though some groups are distinctly categorized, e.g. schoolchildren, "idols", "young men who have not eaten for 48 hours", or restaurateurs. During the preparation of the meals, the celebrity contestants would be allowed to observe each chef's methods up close, and smell/feel (not taste) the various ingredients used, while the Hara-Helicopters would watch the action from their seats overlooking the stage. In some episodes, Kusanagi would bring a plate of one of the special ingredients up to the Hara-Helicopters so they could smell it. The series went on hiatus on September 14, 2006, and returned on January 4, 2007, for a one-time only TV special.

== Airing time in JST ==
- 28 NNS stations: 9:00 p.m. - 9:54 p.m. every Thursday
- TV Miyazaki: 8:00 a.m. - 8:55 a.m. every Sunday
- Oita Broadcasting Sys., Inc.: 6:55 p.m. - 7:49 p.m. every Thursday
- Ryūkyū Broadcasting Corporation: 2:54 p.m. - 3:50 p.m. every Saturday

== Foreign broadcasts ==
- KIKU-TV runs a subtitled version of the show, billing as Dotchi no Ryori
- UTB Hollywood runs a subtitled version of show, billing as Cooking Showdown for on the English version of the website and どっちの料理ショー for the Japanese version of the website.
- KSCI in the Los Angeles area broadcasts Dotch on channel 18.2 at 9:00 PM on Mondays.

== See also ==
- Iron Chef
