= Food Fight (TV series) =

- Created by: Shinji Nojima (野島伸司)
- Starring: Tsuyoshi Kusanagi; Kyoko Fukada
- Country of origin: Japan
- No. of episodes: 11

Original release
- Network: NTV
- Release: 1 July – 30 September 2000

Food Fight (フードファイト, Fūdo Faito) is a Japanese television drama starring Tsuyoshi Kusanagi released in 2000. The main character, Mitsuru, is a janitor who leads a double life as a champion food-eater.

Also starring Kyoko Fukada, the show aired in Japan from 1 July to 30 September 2000, and was moderately successful, with an average rating of 17.5% and a peak rating of 21.5%.

== Cast ==
- Ihara Mitsuru – Tsuyoshi Kusanagi
- Tamura Manami – Kyoko Fukada
- Miyazono Saeka – Rie Miyazawa
- Miyazono Kyosaku – Shiro Sano
- Kisaragi Eiichi – Kakei Toshio
- Crow's voice – Takuya Kimura

== Characters ==
The fact that Takuya Kimura voiced Kyutaro was kept secret until the very end

- Ihara Mitsuru – a custodian working for a large food producer after growing up in an orphanage who is secretly a champion of a food eating competition. After winning he usually proclaims his stomach is as huge as the size of the universe.
- Tamura Manami – a college student who volunteers for an orphanage where Mitsuru was raised
- Miyazono Saeka – the wife of Miyazono; she married him solely for money
- Miyazono Kyosaku – the head of the large food production company who secretly sponsors the underground "food fight"; the eleventh challenger
- Kisaragi Eiichi – the ninth challenger of the "food fight"; after deciding that Mitsuru is a natural-born "food fighter" he analyzes the challengers and gives helpful advice to him
- Kyutaro – a talking black bird who is a friend and partner of Mitsuru; voiced by Takuya Kimura

== The challengers ==
The list runs in a chronological order with the food of each challenger's choice.

- Yoneyama Katsuyoshi – ramen
- Gonzales Iwagami – spicy curry
- Fujishiro Yukiko – Kakigori
- Manaka Hiromi – Mochi
- Kagami Shunsuke – yakitori
- Ihara Satoko – Croquette
- Carlos Okamura – steak
- Kisaragi Eiichi - Hiyashi Chuka/Cold noodles
- Sugawara Kentaro – sushi
- Miyazono Kyosaku - Onigiri

== Summary ==
The president of a large food production company combines gourmet eating and gambling into an underground eating contest, or "Food Fight," in the basement of his company. After growing up in an orphanage, Mitsuru Ihara starts working as a custodian at the large food producer. The pleasant, kind Ihara often visits his former home, pretending to be an important business man, not the blue-collar cleaner that he really is. He also has a bigger secret, which is, he is the reigning champion of the underground eating competition held at the company. In it, two contestants battle to see who can pack away more food within a set time limit. The noble Ihara, with nine consecutive wins, always donates the prize money anonymously to his orphanage, despite the fact that he wins millions. The circumstances surrounding his victories, however, are often surprising and usually unusual, perhaps unrealistic. He also wins by a very small margin, by only 1 point in most cases.

== Special episode ==
Hong Kong Battle

In the final episode, Mitsuru collapsed at the counter of the beef bowl restaurant (Matsuya) that he stopped by after the match with Miyazono (It ended as he had lost his life). He is nowhere to be seen, the beef bowl with miso soup ordered was empty. Retired from the food fighter, He is still alive and became a full-time employee of Miyazono General Foods. At the beginning, he lost his memory and since Mitsuru was found at Matsuya he was called "Matsu-kun" by the boy who hide him. The Battle struggles with memory and appetite loss. His memory returns during the Xiaolongbao confrontation with Liang and he revived as a food fighter.

Midnight Express Death Fight

As before, he was struggling to win. Kinichi Hagimoto played a powerful enemy boss. Who challenged him with wounds all over his body in a series of battles. Took his quote "My stomach is the universe" and Mitsuru was completely defeated. He collapsed and Mitsuru's sister appeared mysteriously at the end. Leaving some lead to further sequels. The story remained unfinished and a sequel was not produced due to the impact of an accident that occurred later. The Train vehicle that appeared was 113 series.

== Sealed work ==
This work was a hit, with two special episode being produced even after the broadcast ended. But on January 15, 2002, junior high school students in Aichi Prefecture have bread-eating competition during school lunch and choked death happen on April 24 the same year. Due to this accident the sequel stop without further production. Rebroadcast, VHS, DVD, or Internet distribution, and since then all ceased. It has been virtually a sealed work. In addition, due to the impact of this accident. Similar work from TBS and TV Tokyo. Which were producing fast-eating competition programs at the time, temporarily stopped on the subject.

However on the August 23rd 2000, The Victor Entertainment original soundtrack work was released.

Not everything is treated as the fact that the work itself never existed. Tsuyoshi Kusanagi, who starred in this work. He seems like to use the quote "My stomach is the universe!" Even after the end of this work, he often said this line in the food variety show he appeared in.

On June 5, 2022, " ABEMA distributed on 7.2 New Another Window ", Tsuyoshi Kusanagi said in the program that he would not do gluttonous work again.
