= Chōyū Sekai =

Web manhua

- Manhua
- Published by Tencent
- Original net animation
- Directed by: Hatsuki Tsuji; Masahiro Sonoda
- Written by: Akihiko Inari
- Studio: Asahi Production
- Released: 12 January – 8 June 2017

Chōyū Sekai

Chinese name
- Traditional Chinese: 超遊世界
- Simplified Chinese: 超游世界
Transcriptions
Standard Mandarin
- Hanyu Pinyin: Chāoyóu Shìjiè

Japanese name
- Kanji: 超遊世界
- Hiragana: ちょうゆうせかい
- Katakana: チョウユウセカイ
Transcriptions
- Romanization: Chōyū Sekai

Chōyū Sekai is a web manhua published by Tencent. A Chinese-Japanese animated series based on the manhua aired in China and Japan from 12 January 2017 to 8 June 2017. Success and Asahi Production co-produced the anime adaptation.

== Characters ==
- Noii

Voiced by: Shun Horie

- Motis

Voiced by: Yoshiko Ikuta

- Cass

Voiced by: Yurika Kubo

- Haki

Voiced by: Kazutomi Yamamoto

- Vinsen

Voiced by: Yuhi Asagiri

- Keikan

Voiced by: Kazuma Horie

- Ryū-sensei

Voiced by: Emiri Katō

- Chinnō

Voiced by: Sarara Yashima

- Hakū

Voiced by: Rika Tachibana

- Mōnsuto

Voiced by: Riho Iida

- Viros

Voiced by: Takehito Koyasu
