= Sono 'Okodawari', Ore ni mo Kure yo! =

Japanese manga series by Tōru Seino

- Manga volume 1 cover

その『おこだわり』、俺にもくれよ!!
- Genre: Comedy
- Manga
- Written by: Tōru Seino
- Published by: Kodansha
- Magazine: Monthly Morning Two; (November 21, 2014 – October 22, 2015); Morning; (December 3, 2015 – April 5, 2018)
- Original run: November 21, 2014 – April 5, 2018
- Volumes: 5
- Television drama

Sono 'Okodawari', Watashi ni mo Kure yo!!
- Directed by: Tetsuaki Matsue
- Written by: Takeshi Takemura
- Music by: Tarō Nakasa
- Original network: TV Tokyo, TV Osaka
- Original run: April 2016 – June 18, 2016
- Episodes: 11

Sono 'Okodawari', Ore ni mo Kure yo! (Japanese: その『おこだわり』、俺にもくれよ!!; "Give Me Those Fixations Too!") is a Japanese comedy manga written and illustrated by Tōru Seino. It was published in Kodansha's Monthly Morning Two from November 2014 to October 2015. and later in Morning from December 2015 to April 2018, with its chapters collected in five wide-ban volumes.

It was adapted into a mockumentary television series titled Sono 'Okodawari', Watashi ni mo Kure yo!! (その『おこだわり』、私にもくれよ!!), broadcast on TV Tokyo and TV Osaka starting in April 2016.

== Media ==
=== Manga ===
Sono 'Okodawari', Ore ni mo Kure yo! is written and illustrated by Tōru Seino. The series ran in Kodansha's Monthly Morning Two from November 21, 2014, to October 22, 2015. It was then transferred to Morning, where it ran from December 3, 2015, to April 5, 2018. Kodansha collected its chapters in five wide-ban volumes, released from June 23, 2015, to July 23, 2018.

==== Volume list ====
| No. | Release date | ISBN |
|---|---|---|
| 1 | June 23, 2015 | 978-4-06-388471-5 |
| 2 | February 19, 2016 | 978-4-06-337841-2 |
| 3 | November 22, 2016 | 978-4-06-388665-8 |
| 4 | August 23, 2017 | 978-4-06-337863-4 |
| 5 | July 23, 2018 | 978-4-06-511891-7 |

== Cast ==
- Mayu Matsuoka
- Sairi Itō
