= Gaiji Keisatsu =

Japanese television series

- Official DVD Cover of Gaiji Keisatsu released in Japan
- Also known as: Criminal Code
- Original title: 外事警察
- Genre: Suspense
- Starring: Atsurō Watabe; Yuriko Ishida; Machiko Ono
- Country of origin: Japan
- Original language: Japanese
- No. of seasons: 1
- No. of episodes: 6

Production
- Production location: Tokyo
- Running time: 53 minutes

Original release
- Network: NHK
- Release: November 14, 2009 – 19 December 2009

Criminal Code (外事警察, Gaiji Keisatsu) is a Japanese television drama mini-series that aired on NHK from 14 November 2009 to 19 December 2009. It is based on the novel of the same name written and released in Japan by Aso Iku.

The TV show follow a female police officer who was recruited into the Tokyo Metropolitan Police's anti-terrorist black ops unit known "publicly" as the Fourth Foreign Affairs Section, created after the 9/11 events in the United States. Its purpose is to tackle espionage and terrorism cases happening in Japan.

The franchise consists of the novel, the TV series and the 2012 movie.

== Plot ==
After the September 11, 2001 attacks on American soil, the Tokyo Metropolitan Police Department creates a secret anti-terrorist division within the Public Security Bureau, known as the Fourth Foreign Affairs Section, in order to tackle crime, espionage and terrorism cases to preserve Japan's national security by doing black ops work to locate and apprehend spies and terrorist suspects.

The unit recruits a new officer named Hina Matsuzawa, who wishes to become a full-time detective. Leading the unit is Public Security veteran officer Keiji Sumimoto as the unit is tasked a mysterious terrorist freelancer known with the codename FISH and his cell operating in Tokyo.

== Cast ==
Fourth Foreign Affairs Section

- Atsurō Watabe as Kenji Sumimoto
  - Takumi Kitamura as Kenji Sumimoto (child)
- Machiko Ono as Hina Matsuzawa
- Reiko Kataoka as Ayane Igarashi
- Toshiyuki Kitami as Ryoga Kanazawa
- Kenichi Takito as Shuma Hisano
- Kiyohiko Shibukawa as Takuya Morinaga
- Hiroshi Yamamoto as Haruto Otomo

Others

- Yuriko Ishida as Aiko Shimomura
- Kimiko Yo as Kumi Muramatsu (Chief Cabinet Secretary)
- Ryo Ishibashi as Shotaro Ariga (Chief of NPA Security bureau)
- Kenichi Endō as Toshitaka Kurata (Officer of NPA, Chief officer of ZERO section)

== Development ==
On October 17, 2009, a press conference was held with Atsuro Watanabe, Yuriko Ishida and Machiko Ono attending and answering questions from the press regarding the show.

On May 3, 2012, the show was aired with the six episodes condensed under 89 minutes under the title Gaiji Keisatsu Special 89 Minutes Remix Edition (外事警察スペシャル 89分リミックス版, Gaiji keisatsu supesharu 89-bu rimikkusu-ban).

== Awards ==
The show received the Excellence Award in the Drama Category at the 27th ATP Awards Television Grand Prix in 2010.
