= FNN Date Line =

FNN Date Line was the last news television program of the night on Fuji Television in Japan. It was broadcast with that name from October 1987 to March 1990.

== History ==
Until March 1988, the program was a baseball show. After the first half of April 1988, it became a general news program.

After April 1990, the program was renamed "FNN Newscom".

== Broadcasters ==
- Weekday October 1987 - March 1988: Shigeru Tsuyuki, Michiko Yamamura, Shinya Sasaki (Another news anchor, Michiko Yamamura, left the show in less than two months)
- Weekday April, 1988 - March 1989: Akio Ueda, Mina Koide
- Weekday April, 1989 - March 1990: Tarō Kimura, Noriko Matsuo
- Weekend October, 1987 - March 1988: Nobumichi Nagashima, Monta Mino, Tomoko Oshima
- Weekend April, 1988 - March 1990: Hideki Yamanaka
