= Baribari Value =

Japanese game show

Baribari Value (世界バリバリ★バリュー, Sekai Baribari ★ Baryuu) (or Baribari Value Around the World) is a weekly panel game show that is being broadcast from 22:00 (JST) until 22:54 every Wednesday; it is produced by Mainichi Broadcasting System (MBS-TV) in Osaka, Japan.

== Premise ==
Quiz questions are set by reporters on location, who ask celebrity panelists in the studio to guess the prices of various things. In the show's original format, panelists guessed the prices of expensive or unusual items or services from around the world. In the present format, however, they are asked to guess prices related to the lifestyles of the rich. The rich people visited are generally in Japan, although questions are sometimes sent from overseas.

== History ==
Baribari started airing in Japan on April 15, 2003. From the start of its run until October 2005, the show was broadcast between 22:00 (JST) and 22:54 every Tuesday. It earned consistently good ratings every week. On October 19, 2005, its showtime was moved to Wednesdays from 22:00 until 22:54. Its ratings faltered for a while, then recovered.

Baribari is well known as a "celebrity introduction show" in Japan. This quiz show has introduced to the public celebrities such as surgeon Yuko Ikeda and her daughter Kanako Ikeda.
