= Evening 5 =

Japanese television news program

Evening 5 (イブニング・ファイブ, Evening Five) was a news program made by Tokyo Broadcasting System, Inc. It was broadcast from March 28, 2005, to March 27, 2009.

== Newscasters ==
Head newscaster
- Takae Mikumo (三雲孝江; free-lance announcer)
Commentator
- Hideya Sugio (杉尾秀哉; TBS special commentary committee)
Newscasters
- Hiroko Ogura (小倉弘子; TBS announcer)
- Syohei Fujimori (藤森祥平; TBS announcer)
- Ayu Yamanouchi (山内あゆ; TBS announcer)
Weathercaster
- Masamitsu Morita (森田正光)

== Rival programs ==
- NHK News7 (NHK General Television)
- News Every (Nippon Television)
- Super News (Fuji Television)
- Super J Channel (TV Asahi)
