= The Rime of the Ancient Mariner in popular culture =

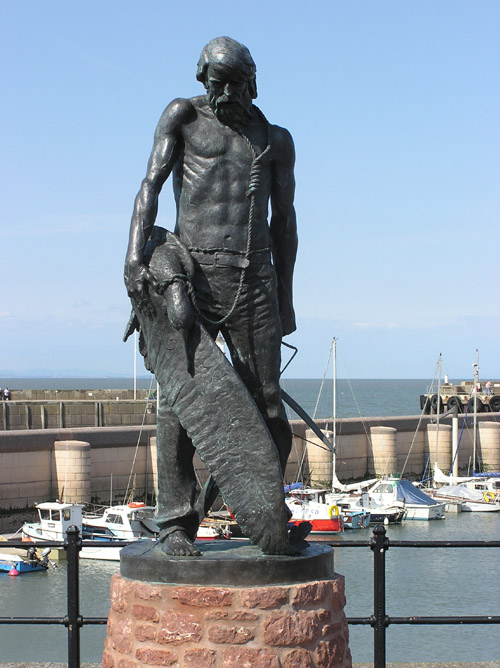
A statue of the Ancient Mariner with the albatross hung from his neck at Watchet Harbour, Somerset, England, unveiled in September 2003 as a tribute to Coleridge

The Rime of the Ancient Mariner, a poem by Samuel Taylor Coleridge that was first published in 1798, has been referenced in various works of popular culture.

== Literature ==
- In Anne Rice's novel Interview with the Vampire, Louis de Pointe du Lac quoted these lines when referring to Claudia: "Her lips were red, her looks were free, Her locks were yellow as gold: Her skin was as white as leprosy, The Night-mare LIFE-IN-DEATH was she, Who thicks man's blood with cold".
- The poem features prominently in Douglas Adams's novel Dirk Gently's Holistic Detective Agency, in which the title character time travels to interrupt Coleridge's work on his poem "Kubla Khan". During a rambling dialogue intended to prevent Coleridge from unintentionally encoding in the poem information that could lead to the destruction of the human race, Dirk Gently's references to "Albert Ross", another character in the novel, are misheard as "albatross", which Coleridge says might be an idea for another poem he is working on and superior to a previous idea involving a meteor striking the Earth.
- In Mary Shelley's Frankenstein, chapter 5, Victor Frankenstein quotes the lines: "Like one, that on a lonesome road / Doth walk in fear and dread / And, having once turned round, walks on / And turns no more his head / Because he knows a frightful fiend / Doth close behind him tread" (Penguin Popular Classic 1968 page 57, cited from Rime, 1817 edition). In the book's opening letters from Robert Walton to his sister, specifically Letter II, Walton explicitly mentions the poem by name and claims he "shall kill no albatross" on his journey.
- Edgar Allan Poe's only complete novel, The Narrative of Arthur Gordon Pym of Nantucket, is inspired by The Rime of the Ancient Mariner.
- Herman Melville's novel Moby-Dick is inspired in part by The Rime of the Ancient Mariner.
- P. G. Wodehouse's short story ‘’Uneasy Money’’ quotes the first few lines of the poem.
- P. G. Wodehouse's short story "Ukridge’s Dog College" in Ukridge quotes the final lines of part 6.
- Alan Moore and Dave Gibbons's Watchmen includes a story within a story "Tales of the Black Freighter", which bears similarities to the poem through its supernatural themes and the tale of a mariner's impending doom.
- In Cassandra Clare's novel Clockwork Prince, second in The Infernal Devices series of The Shadowhunter Chronicles, Will Herondale makes several humorous references to the poem, due to the resemblance of an elderly, white-bearded coachman to the Ancient Mariner.
- Tui T. Sutherland's epic dragon fantasy series Wings of Fire features the character Albatross, who was directly inspired by the bird of the same name in The Rime of the Ancient Mariner. Additionally, fans and reviewers alike have noted parallels between Coleridge's poem and the psychological conditions of animus magic in the series' second arc (Books 6-10) and first special edition (Darkstalker).

== Games ==
- In the online computer game Guild Wars, the opening lines of NPC Samti Kohlreg's dialogue and the name of his quest reference the poem and the author. In its sequel, Guild Wars 2, the name of the item Rime-Rimmed Mariner's Rebreather is a reference to the poem.
- In the collectible card game Magic: The Gathering, the flavor texts of the cards Scathe Zombies, Wall of Ice and Will-o'-the-Wisp (all from the Limited Edition Alpha set) are quotes from the poem.
- The My Little Pony MMORPG Legends of Equestria has a quest called "Rhyme of the Ancient Aviator." The eponymous pony is a grizzled pegasus who tells the player his backstory in the form of a lengthy ballad strongly inspired by the events of Coleridge's poem.
- In the online browser-based game Fallen London, the player character can experience three sequences of dreams loosely based on the poem: "I Shot the Albatross", "Betwixt Us and the Sun" and "Upon a Painted Sea".
- In the video game Stardew Valley, the player can purchase the Mermaid's Pendant, a marriage token, from the Old Mariner.

== Comics ==
- MAD Magazine #200 (July 1978) published "The Rime of the Modern Skateboarder", a full-length burlesque by Tom Koch and Don Martin. A similar parody entitled "The Rime of the Modern Surfer" had previously been created by the same people.
- In Marvel Comics, author Bill Everett named his most famous character, Namor the Sub-Mariner (an antihero), in part from this poem. Namor, The Sub-Mariner number 44 (1993) is an adapted version of the poem.
- In an issue of The Incredible Hulk, Bruce Banner discusses the poem with his captor, particularly the mariner's motive for killing the albatross.
- Carl Barks' final ten-pager for Walt Disney's Comics and Stories in No. 312 (Sept. 1966) is a tale titled "The Not-so-Ancient Mariner". In it, the closing lines of the first part of Coleridge's poem ("Why look'st thou so?'—'With my crossbow/I shot the Albatross.") are quoted several times.
- The cartoonist Hunt Emerson produced a graphic novel, Rime of the Ancient Mariner, illustrating the poem, featuring visual puns, gags and grotesque caricatures. The text, however, is essentially used verbatim.

== Music ==
- "Rime of the Ancient Mariner" is a song by the English heavy metal band Iron Maiden, from their fifth studio album, Powerslave (1984). Written by the band's bass player Steve Harris, the song is based on Coleridge's poem with many direct quotes from the text. The song is almost fourteen minutes long and like the poem, it contains several distinct sections with differing moods. It has remained a fan favorite.
- Fleetwood Mac's hit song "Albatross" drew its title from the poem, as the composer Peter Green read the poem when he was at school. The album The Pious Bird of Good Omen, which includes "Albatross", has a cover that features a nun with an albatross, alluding to the symbology among sailors and Coleridge's poem.
- Malvina Reynolds's song "The Albatross" is based on the poem and applies its moral to modern life.
- David Bedford recorded a concept album The Rime of the Ancient Mariner in 1975. An experimental work, it consists of two parts of the poem set to music, and is similar in style to a dramatic reading of the poem.
- Slint's closing track 'Good Morning, Captain' on the 1991 album Spiderland is inspired on the poem.
- The single "Albatross" by American Heavy Metal band Corrosion of Conformity off their 1994 album "Deliverance" alludes to the omen of the albatross.
- The song "Albatross" by Wild Beasts re-tells the story of the poem.
- American punk band Alesana's song "Heavy Hangs the Albatross" is named in reference to the poem.
- The Big Wreck song "Albatross" alludes to the poem, particularly via the lyric "I'll wear the albatross for one more day".
- The band Foxing named their first album Albatross, and the song "Bloodhound" makes reference to "An Albatross hanging from my neck"
- The British band Bastille references the poem in the hidden song "Weight of Living Pt. I" from their album Bad Blood, also contained officially in other editions from the same album. It mentions phrases like "There's an Albatross around your neck" and "Your Albratross, shoot it down".
- The video to the single "Forever Blue" by Swing Out Sister features a man reading The Rime of the Ancient Mariner
- Steven Wilson named the song "No Twilight within the Courts of the Sun", from his album Insurgentes, after a gloss Coleridge added to the poem.
- Weezer's song "Wind in our Sail" opens with the line "A boy and a girl/Albatross around their necks."
- British rock band Foals have a song called "Albatross" on their fourth album, What Went Down, to which the opening line is "You got an albatross around your neck".
- American indie rock band Car Seat Headrest released a song titled 'Beach Life-In-Death', in reference to the character Life-In-Death from the poem.
- American singer-songwriter Taylor Swift has a track on her album The Tortured Poets Department titled "The Albatross".
- American emo band I Hate Myself references the poem in the song titled 'Not Waving But Drowning' from their 1997 LP Ten Songs

== Film and Television ==
- The lost 1925 silent film The Ancient Mariner contained a dream sequence based on the poem.
- A 1952 Looney Tunes short is titled "Water, Water Every Hare".
- In the 1971 film Willy Wonka and the Chocolate Factory, the title character paraphrases saying, "bubbles, bubbles everywhere but not a drop to drink...yet."
- Raúl daSilva produced and directed a critically acclaimed six-time international prizewinning visualisation of the epic poem, titled Rime of the Ancient Mariner (1975) using the work of illustrators of the past two centuries who attempted to bring life to the epic. Sir Michael Redgrave, who once taught the poem as a schoolmaster, narrates it. The film also includes a biography of Samuel Taylor Coleridge and how he came to write the poem.
- In the 1981 film Shock Treatment, the character Betty Hapschatt reads part of the poem with character Oliver Wright on a stakeout. Both are caught when a guard calls out to them with a dead albatross and asks "Does this bird belong to you?"
- In the 1982 film Monty Python Live at the Hollywood Bowl, John Cleese portrays a foul-mouthed concessions vendor wandering amongst the audience, forever damned to attempt to sell his one product, a single dead albatross.
- In the 1985 film Out of Africa, the character Denys, played by Robert Redford, quotes a few of the later verses of the poem, as he and Karen Blixen, played by Meryl Streep, sit by a stream while Denys washes her hair.
- In the 1993 Episode of The Simpsons titled Boy-Scoutz 'n the Hood, Homer misquotes lines from The Rime of the Ancient Mariner when he says "Water, water everywhere/So let's all have a drink."
- In 1998, BBC produced The Rime of the Ancient Mariner as a 57-minute made-for-TV movie with Films for Humanities and the Sciences (FHS) that features Paul McGann as both Samuel Taylor Coleridge and the Ancient Mariner. The film was directed by Juliet May and produced by Anne Brogan.
- In the 2005 film, Serenity, the antagonist says to the main protagonist that one of his crew is an albatross and will only bring destruction to them all, to which the protagonist replies, "Way I remember it, albatross was a ship's good luck, 'til some idiot killed it."
- In the 2024 Episode of Fallout titled The Head, The Ghoul quotes the poem when referring to the irradiated, undrinkable water of the Wasteland.

== Sports ==
- Baseball pitcher Diego Seguí, who was pitching for the Seattle Mariners at the age of 40, was tagged by sportswriters as "The Ancient Mariner". In 1983, the nickname was bestowed on then-43-year-old pitcher Gaylord Perry. Fifteen years later, Jamie Moyer (who pitched until 49 in the MLB, and up to age 43 with the Mariners) inherited the nickname.
- Dick Stuart, one of the worst fielders in Major League Baseball history, acquired a number of humorously derisive nicknames to this effect, such as "Dr. Strangeglove", "Stonefingers", "The Man With the Iron Glove", and "The Boston Strangler". Another was "The Ancient Mariner", referencing the first two lines of the poem: "It is an ancient Mariner,/And he stoppeth one of three", comically ascribing this as percentage of batted balls hit within range of his position that Stuart supposedly fielded successfully.

== See also ==
- Albatross (metaphor)
