= List of animated feature films of 1975 =

This is a list of animated feature films first released in 1975.

== List ==
Title	Country	Director	Production company	Animation technique	Format	Notes	Release date	Duration
Bedbug-75, or Mayakovsky's Laughing; Маяковский смеется, или Клоп-75'	Soviet Union	Anatoliy Karanovich; Sergei Yutkevich	Mosfilm; Soyuzmultfilm	Live action/Stop motion/Cutout/Traditional	Theatrical		September 3, 1976	87 minutes
Bugs Bunny: Superstar	United States	Larry Jackson	Warner Bros. Cartoons (segments); Hare-Raising Films (main feature); United Artists (distributor)	Traditional/Live action	Theatrical; Compilation film Documentary film	Film compiled from theatrical animated shorts; first of six Looney Tunes compilation feature films. First Looney Tunes documentary production overall.	December 19, 1975	90 minutes
Coonskin	United States	Ralph Bakshi	Bakshi Productions; Albert S. Ruddy Productions; Bryanston Distributors, Inc.	Traditional	Theatrical		August 20, 1975	83 minutes
Dick Deadeye, or Duty Done	United Kingdom	Bill Melendez	Melendez Films; Cinema International Corporation	Traditional	Theatrical	Produced to celebrate the Gilbert and Sullivan Centenary.	September 1975	81 minutes
Donald Duck's Frantic Antic	United States		Walt Disney Productions	Traditional	Theatrical; Compilation film	Film compiled from Disney theatrical animated shorts; originally released theatrically for overseas markets and never in the United States. Originally titled The Donald Duck Story.	August 27, 1975	92 minutes
La Genèse; The Genesis	France	Pierre Alibert	Les Films du Cyprès; Valoria Films	Traditional/Cutout	Theatrical		January 22, 1975	60 minutes
Hans Christian Andersen's The Little Mermaid アンデルセン童話 にんぎょ姫 (Anderusen Dōwa Ningyo Hime)	Japan	Tomoharu Katsumata	Toei Animation	Traditional/Live action	Theatrical		March 21, 1975	68 minutes
Hugo the Hippo; Hugó, a víziló	Hungary; United States	William Feigenbaum; József Gémes	Pannónia Filmstúdió; Brut Productions	Traditional	Theatrical		December 14, 1975	91 minutes
The Humpbacked Horse; Конёк-Горбуно́к (Konyok Gorbunok)	Soviet Union	Ivan Ivanov-Vano; Boris Butakov	Soyuzmultfilm	Traditional	Theatrical	American truncated version released on October 25, 1977, under the title The Magic Pony with the changed music line and original credits.	October 24, 1975	73 minutes
Ivanhoe	Australia	Leif Gram	Air Programs International	Traditional	Television special	Originally aired as the 19th installment of the CBS animated anthology series Famous Classic Tales (1970–1984).	November 27, 1975	48 minutes
Junma feiteng 骏马飞腾	China	Jun Xi; Liu Huiyi		Stop motion				
The Last of the Mohicans	United States; Australia	Charles A. Nicholas	Hanna-Barbera Australia	Traditional	Television special	Originally aired as the 18th installment of the CBS animated anthology series Famous Classic Tales (1970–1984).	November 27, 1975	60 minutes
Moby-Dick	Australia	Richard Slapczynski	Air Programs International	Traditional	Television special	Originally aired as the 16th installment of the CBS animated anthology series Famous Classic Tales (1970–1984).	January 1, 1975	51 minutes
The Mysterious Island	Australia	Leif Gram	Air Programs International	Traditional	Television special	Originally aired as the 17th installment of the CBS animated anthology series Famous Classic Tales (1970–1984).	November 15, 1975	60 minutes
Pinchcliffe Grand Prix; Flåklypa Grand Prix	Norway	Ivo Caprino		Stop motion		First Norwegian animated feature.	August 28, 1975	88 minutes
Rime of the Ancient Mariner	United States	Raúl daSilva		Photoanimation	Theatrical; Experimental film		June 11, 1975	60 minutes
Robinson Columbus	Denmark	Ib Steinaa		Traditional			March 27, 1975	60 minutes
The Story of Chinese Gods 封神榜 (Feng Shen Bang)	Taiwan	Chang Chih-Hui		Traditional		First Taiwanese animated feature.	February 11, 1975	85 minutes
Tarzoon: Shame of the Jungle; Tarzoon, la honte de la jungle	France; Belgium	Picha; Boris Szulzinger		Traditional	Theatrical	First foreign-animated film to receive both an X rating and wide distribution in the United States.	September 4, 1975	85 minutes
Trapito; Petete y Trapito (Petete and Trapito)	Argentina	Manuel García Ferré	Producciones García Ferré	Traditional	Theatrical		July 17, 1975	68 minutes
Tubby the Tuba	United States	Alexander Schure	New York Institute of Technology; Avco Embassy Pictures	Traditional	Theatrical		April 1, 1975	81 minutes
Walt Disney's Cartoon Carousel	United States	Jack Hannah; Jack King; Jack Kinney; Riley Thomson	Walt Disney Productions	Traditional	Theatrical; Compilation film	Film compiled from Disney theatrical animated shorts; originally released theatrically for overseas markets and never in the United States.	August 29, 1975	70 minutes

== See also ==
- List of animated television series of 1975
