= Ancient Mariner (disambiguation) =

The Ancient Mariner is the title character of Samuel Taylor Coleridge's poem The Rime of the Ancient Mariner.

Ancient Mariner may also refer to:

- The Ancient Mariner (film), 1925 silent film based on the poem
- Ancient Mariner (cocktail), a cocktail first documented in 1998

== See also ==
- Rime of the Ancient Mariner (disambiguation)
