= Ten Songs =

Ten Songs may refer to:

== Music ==
=== Classical compositions ===
- 10 Songs, a composition by Mily Balakirev (1837–1910)
- 10 Songs, Op. 15 (1899), a composition by Josef Suk
- 10 Songs, BB 42 (1906), from Hungarian folksongs for voice and piano (Bartók)

=== Albums ===
- 10 Songs, a later version of Melvins! (album) by the Melvins
- 10 Songs (I Hate Myself album), 1997
- 10 Songs, a 2002 album by Friend/Enemy; see Tim Kinsella
- Ten Songs by Adam Again, a 1988 album by Adam Again
- Tensongs, a 1986 album by Hubert Kah
- 10 Songs (Travis album), 2020

== See also ==
- "Ten" (song) by Jewel
- Diez canciones de Gardel, a 1931 Argentine film
- Ten Blake Songs, a 1957 song cycle by Ralph Vaughan Williams
- Biblical Songs, Op. 99 (1894), musical settings of ten texts by Antonín Dvořák
- 10 Songs for the New Depression, a 2010 album by Loudon Wainwright III
- Ten Songs in the Key of Betrayal, a 2004 album by Alien Crime Syndicate
- Ten New Songs, a 2001 album by Leonard Cohen
- Ten Songs for Another World, a 1990 album by The World of Skin
- Ten Songs, Ten Years, Ten Days, a 2011 album by Tokyo Police Club
- Ten Songs from Live at Carnegie Hall, a 2015 album by Ryan Adams
- Ten of Songs, a 1988 album by Robin Williamson (re-issued 1993)
- 10 Song Demo, a 1996 album by Rosanne Cash
- Dix chansons pour l'été, a 1958 album by Yves Montand
