= Rime of the Ancient Mariner (disambiguation) =

The Rime of the Ancient Mariner is a poem by Samuel Taylor Coleridge.

Rime of the Ancient Mariner may also refer to:

- Rime of the Ancient Mariner (film), a 1975 British film
- The Rime of the Ancient Mariner (film), a 1978 British television film
- "Rime of the Ancient Mariner" (song), a song by Iron Maiden from the album Powerslave

== See also ==
- Ancient Mariner (disambiguation)
