= List of animated television series of 1975 =

A list of animated television series first aired in 1975.

Animated television series first aired in 1975
Title	Episodes	Country	Year	Notes	Technique
The Adventures of Pepero	26	Japan	1975–76		Anime
Animal Kwackers		United Kingdom	1975		Live-action/Traditional
Arabian Nights: Sinbad's Adventures	52	Japan	1975–76		Anime
Bod	13	United Kingdom	1975		Traditional
Boule et Bill	26	Belgium	1975		Traditional
Brave Raideen	50	Japan	1975–76		Anime
Charlie's Climbing Tree	12	Sweden	1975–76		Traditional
Dog of Flanders	52	Japan	1975		Anime
Don Chuck Monogatari	26	Japan	1975		Anime
Fraidy Cat	12	United States	1975	Aired as part of Uncle Croc's Block	Traditional
Gamba no Bouken	26	Japan	1975		Anime
Ganso Tensai Bakabon	103	Japan	1975–77		Anime
Getter Robo G	39	Japan	1975–76		Anime
The Great Grape Ape Show	16	United States	1975	Originally segment on The New Tom & Jerry/Grape Ape Show	Traditional
Grendizer	74	Japan	1975–77		Anime
Grisù	52	Italy	1975		Traditional
Ikkyū-san	296	Japan	1975–82		Anime
Ivor the Engine	66	United Kingdom	1975		Cut-out
Kangurek Hip-Hop	13	Poland	1975–83		Traditional
Kérem a következőt!	39	Hungary	1975–83		Traditional
Kirin Monoshiri Kan	1565	Japan	1975–79		Anime
Kum-Kum	26	Japan	1975–76		Anime
La Seine no Hoshi	39	Japan	1975		Anime
Laura, the Prairie Girl	26	Japan	1975–76		Anime
Leopold the Cat	11	Soviet Union	1975–87		Traditional
M*U*S*H	30	United States	1975–76	Aired as part of Uncle Croc's Block	Traditional
Manga Nihon Mukashi Banashi	12	Japan	1975		Anime
Maya the Honey Bee	52	Japan	1975–76		Anime
Miś Uszatek	104	Poland	1975–87		Stop-motion
Noddy	26	United Kingdom	1975		Stop-motion
The Oddball Couple	16	United States	1975		Traditional
Peter Puck	9	United States	1975		Traditional
Rákosníček	39	Czechoslovakia	1975–87		Traditional
Return to the Planet of the Apes	13	United States	1975		Traditional
The Secret Lives of Waldo Kitty	13	United States	1975		Live-action/Traditional
Shōnen Tokugawa Ieyasu	20	Japan	1975		Anime
Steel Jeeg	46	Japan	1975–76		Anime
Tekkaman: The Space Knight	26	Japan	1975		Anime
Time Bokan	61	Japan	1975–76		Anime
The Tom & Jerry Show	16	United States	1975	Spin-off of Tom and Jerry	Traditional
Uncle Croc's Block	16	United States	1975–76		Traditional
The Undersea Adventures of Captain Nemo	78	Canada	1975–78		Traditional
Víla Amálka	13	Czechoslovakia	1975		Traditional
Wacky and Packy	16	United States	1975	Aired as part of Uncle Croc's Block	Traditional

== See also ==
- List of animated feature films of 1975
- List of Japanese animation television series of 1975
