= The Ancient Mariner (film) =

1925 film by Henry Otto

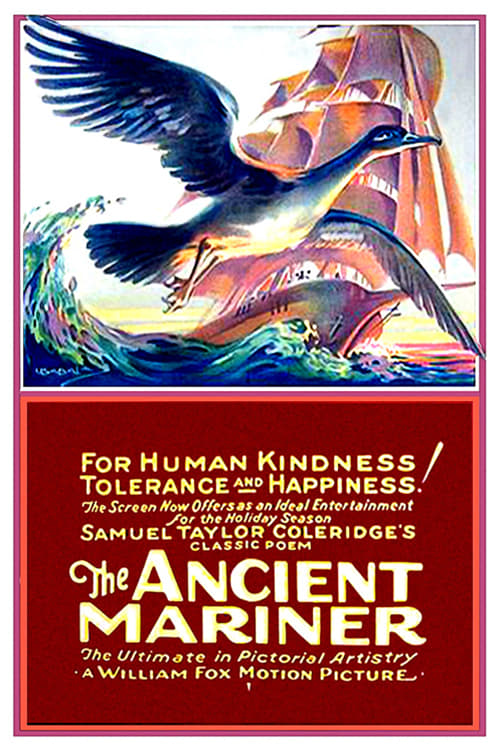
- Movie poster for The Ancient Mariner
- Directed by: Henry Otto; Chester Bennett
- Screenplay by: Eve Unsell
- Based on: The Rime of the Ancient Mariner, a poem by Samuel Taylor Coleridge
- Produced by: William Fox
- Starring: Clara Bow; Gladys Brockwell; Nigel De Brulier
- Cinematography: Joseph August
- Production company: Fox Film Corporation
- Distributed by: Fox Film Corporation
- Release date: December 27, 1925
- Running time: 6 reels
- Country: United States
- Languages: Silent; Intertitles (by Tom Miranda)

The Ancient Mariner is a 1925 American silent fantasy drama film based on the popular 1798 poem, The Rime of the Ancient Mariner by Samuel Taylor Coleridge. The film was directed by Henry Otto and Chester Bennett, and it was adapted for the screen by Eve Unsell. The film stars Clara Bow, Gladys Brockwell, Nigel De Brulier and was distributed by Fox Film Corporation. The film is presumed to be lost.

== Synopsis ==
The official plot synopsis, as provided by the Fox Film Corporation to the copyright registration office and then entered at the Library of Congress:

Doris Matthews, a beautiful, innocent young girl, forsakes her sweetheart, Joel Barlowe, in favor of Victor Brant, a wealthy roué. On the night before they are to elope, an old sailor gives Brant a strange potion to drink and then unfolds before his eyes The Rime of the Ancient Mariner. Deeply touched by this story about the consequences of the wanton destruction of innocent beauty, Brant leaves without Doris. After some time, he returns and finds to his pained satisfaction that Doris, having overcome her infatuation for him, has again turned her tender attentions toward Joel.

— Fox Film Corporation

== Cast ==
Modern sequences (directed by Chester Bennett):

- Clara Bow as Doris
- Leslie Fenton as Joe Barlow
- Nigel De Brulier as Skipper
- Earle Williams as Victor Brandt

Ancient Mariner sequences (directed by Henry Otto):

- Gladys Brockwell as Life In Death
- Robert Klein as Death
- Paul Panzer as Mariner

== Background ==
The publicity department at Fox Films launched a special campaign to promote the film, by sending several "exploitation men" to cover every major area of the country. The campaign blitz included sending sales letters, pamphlets and posters to schools, academies, libraries and literary associations across the country. Close to a hundred thousand bookmarks were distributed to public libraries, with a message promoting the film as a Christmas attraction. A seven-colored half-sheet lithograph, produced by noted Spanish artist Luis Usabal, was distributed to societies who posted them in their reading rooms and other common areas. Fox also sponsored an “Ancient Mariner Essay Contest” in almost 100 newspapers, for students in public, private and parochial schools and academies, which included monetary prizes and free film tickets for the best essay on the subject. The film spent eight months in production, and turned out to be a moderately expensive production that eventually lost $33,000 for the company.

Gustave Doré, a widely known illustrator, made a complete set of drawings for the poem The Rime of the Ancient Mariner, and it was these drawings that many of the scenes of the film were based.

== Reviews and reception ==
Hal Erickson opined in his review that Coleridge's poem had no love interest, which indicated that Eve Unsell did an "extensive rewrite" for the film adaption. George T. Pardy wrote in his review for Motion Picture News that "this production registers as a charming example of screen artistry". Pardy praised film director Henry Otto, saying that he "succeeded in conveying the subtle sense of its bizarre mystery and supernatural lure in a series of scenes that are remarkable for superb lighting effects and magical appeal". Pardy also noted that Panzer and De Brullier's performances were "outstanding". An anonymous reviewer for the Philadelphia Bulletin wrote at the time, "except for a bit of slowness in the unwinding of the theme, the cinema version of Coleridge's famous poem is an entertaining photoplay". Another anonymous review in the Public Ledger said the film "is divided into a modern story and an allegory, and it is in the latter that the picture is most realistic and impressive".

== See also ==
- Rime of the Ancient Mariner (film) (1975)
- The Rime of the Ancient Mariner in popular culture
- List of Fox Film films
- Lost film
- List of lost films
- 1937 Fox vault fire
