= Raúl daSilva =

American filmmaker, writer and photoanimation specialist

- Born: June 12, 1933 (age 92); Brooklyn, New York, New York, U.S.

Raúl daSilva (born June 12, 1933) is an American filmmaker, writer and photoanimation specialist. He produced the photoanimated film The Rime of the Ancient Mariner, an adaptation of Samuel Taylor Coleridge's poem, in 1975.

== Biography ==
Raúl daSilva began his film career in 1965 at the Jam Handy Organization of Detroit, Michigan. Starting as a writer in the animation department, Raúl moved to live action and became a director of several hundred short films for clients such as General Motors, Merck & Co., Chevrolet, and The Boy Scouts of America. It was at this time that he became a producer-director of television commercials and director of public relation films.

DaSilva has been an adjunct instructor on the script scenario at St. John Fisher College and a lecturer in screenwriting and directing at NYU, Rochester Institute of Technology, Brooklyn College, and Ithaca College. He met one of his mentors, TV pioneer writer Rod Serling at Ithaca College where they both lectured. Following that, he worked with Serling on film productions and when the celebrated playwright died at age 50, daSilva was asked to write Serling's eulogy by the Rochester Times Union. Serling had died in the O.R. of Rochester's Strong Memorial Hospital. His summer home was a boathouse on Cayuga Lake, near Ithaca. A re-write of the eulogy was published as "My Friend, Rod Serling, His Legacy" in the July/August 2008 issue of Fate Magazine.

With the urging by actor Sterling Hayden who had been a master of tall ships in his youth, daSilva released his critically acclaimed film adaptation of Samuel Taylor Coleridge's Rime of the Ancient Mariner in 1975. For the film, he used the technique of photoanimation, a technology that he learned at the Jam Handy Organization’s animation department. This allowed him to inexpensively bring to the screen the efforts of illustrators from the 19th and 20th centuries who sought to breathe life into the timeless epic poem by Samuel Taylor Coleridge. After some research he discovered that British actor Sir Michael Redgrave had once taught the epic poem as a schoolmaster. After contracting the actor daSilva flew to London to have Redgrave narrate the epic poem. With over two years in production, the film demonstrated the most complex work in existence today on the craft of photoanimation due to the mixed combination of movements and exposures between the vertical camera and the compass rose movements of the camera stand compound or platform where the graphic material is placed. With the craft becoming computer driven the complexity used at that time is no longer possible today, similarly, as stated by Pixar/Disney's creative genius, John Lasseter who has said that the subtle and complex character renderings of Snow White and the Seven Dwarfs can not be done using a computer but must be rendered by hand.

The production was widely acclaimed by critics and recognized by six international film festival juries throughout the United States that awarded five first place prizes to the film. In this effort, Raúl renewed interest for this 1798 epic poem that speaks to the sanctity of all life on Earth. The film has been distributed throughout North America since 1985 and was also broadcast in Australia.

In addition, daSilva has written magazine articles on spirituality and has presented lectures throughout New York City on the eternal spirit in the ephemeral human experience.

Raul daSilva currently resides in New Haven, Connecticut, where he writes freelance articles and fiction projects. He also writes website articles.

== Filmography ==
| Year | Title | Descp | Producer | Writer | Director | Crew | Ref(s) |
|---|---|---|---|---|---|---|---|
| 1968 | Yesterday | Film | | Yes | Yes | | |
| 1969 | Rochester, First Person Plural | Film | | | Yes | | |
| 1969 | Craftsmen in Concert | Film | | | Yes | | |
| 1973 | The Silent Drum | Film | Yes | | Yes | | |
| 1973 | No Whistles, Bells, or Bedlam | Film | Yes | | Yes | | |
| 1973 | Hidden Battlefield | Film | | | Yes | | |
| 1975 | Rime of the Ancient Mariner... aka The Strangest Voyage | Film | | | Yes | | |
| 1976 | Nat Hurst, MD, a 20th Century American Physician | TV | | Yes | Yes | | |
| 1978 | Standing Tall | TV, script consultant | | | Yes | | |
| 1980 | Conflict and Resolution | Film | | | Yes | Yes | |
| 1981 | Fear No Evil aka Lucifer (Philippines: English title), aka Mark of the Beast | Creative consultant | | | | | |

== Bibliography ==
- 1969, In Flight Aerobics and Transitions Senuta Publishing Co
- 1972, The Motion Picture Production Manual, Eastman Kodak
- 1977, SOUND: Magnetic Recording for Motion Pictures, Eastman Kodak
- 1978, The Business of Filmmaking, Eastman Kodak, ISBN 0879852038
- 1979, The World of Animation [Recipient 1st place, national Book Festival Award) Eastman Kodak,ISBN 9780879852252
- 1986, Making Money in Film and Video: (1st and 2nd editions) Simon and Schuster, 1986 and Butterworth-Heinemann. 1992.ISBN 9780671614119
- 2014. Man of Miracles, The Transcendent Ingo Swann, ASIN B00QLC3PSK
- 2015, My Mystical Life with Rod Serling: A Real Twilight Zone., ASIN B00UG2NB76
- 2015, The Screenwriter's Life Saver: 17 pages of essential first aid tips for screenwriters, at every level, from beginner to master. ASIN B00U47TEYM
- 2015, The Seed" Fiction, graphic novel, ASIN B00W6PXL8K
- 2016, Ingo Swann, Revelations, ASIN B01AQ3NQ9W

== Awards ==
- The Rime of the Ancient Mariner
  - Gold Medal, New York International Film and TV Festival
  - Gold Venus Award, Virgin Island International Film Festival
  - Golden Eagle, Cine Film Festival
  - Cindy Statuette, IFPA
  - Chris Statuette, Columbus International Film Festival
  - Certificate of Merit, Chicago International Film Festival

== See also ==
- Marian apparition
