= I Hate Myself (band) =

American emo band

- Origin: Gainesville, Florida, U.S.
- Genres: Emo, post-hardcore, screamo
- Years active: 1996–1997, 2003, 2005, 2016
- Label: No Idea
- Past members: Jim Marburger; Jon Marburger; Steve Jin

I Hate Myself (often stylized as i hate myself) was an American emo band formed by Jon and Jim Marburger in Gainesville, Florida, in 1996. The band used elements of post-hardcore and indie in their songs.

== History and influence ==
Brothers Jon and Jim Marburger first formed I Hate Myself in order to record a 12-inch record. No titles were given to any album or single, and their first release (a four-song one-sided LP) went so far as to not even include song titles. (The second song is the only one with a known title, "Less Than Nothing", as marked on a later compilation album.) Further releases contained song titles that were often very long by conventional standards, describing odd situations that vocalist Jim Marburger would elaborate on within the song's lyrics. Liner notes to albums were extremely minimal and sometimes filled with self-deprecation from the band. After a string of vinyl-only releases in the mid to late 1990s, the band split up. Soon afterwards the band finally agreed to their first CD release, a collection of their full length 10 Songs LP with one extra track, their contribution to a split 7-inch with Strikeforce Diablo.

The Marburger brothers went on to form Burnman, expanding on the louder side of I Hate Myself's sound. That band dissolved soon after releasing their debut LP, and drummer Jon Marburger joined fellow No Idea artists Gunmoll. The band reunited for two shows on one night in Gainesville in 2003. They requested any audio or video footage be sent to them, fueling fans to wonder if a live release might see the light of day. No plans for such a release have been announced. In 2005, the Marburgers recorded three new I Hate Myself tracks for a one-sided LP release. Bass was overdubbed by Jon Marburger in lieu of reuniting with the original bassist or finding a replacement. Currently, the two brothers are playing together again in Die Hoffnung, who released their first album in 2006, once again on No Idea. A 15-song CD, collecting all the remaining tracks not found on the Ten Songs CD release, has been planned since early 2005, but has not yet materialized. In November of 2016, Jon and Jim played as I Hate Myself in celebration of the book "Gainesville Punk: A History of Bands & Music" by Matt Walker, with recordings of bass being played, presumably by Jon.

== Pop culture references ==
In author Tao Lin's 2007 novel, Eeeee Eee Eeee, the main characters drive around Central Florida listening to I Hate Myself.

== Band members ==
- Jim Marburger — lead vocals, guitars, drums
- Jon Marburger — drums, percussion, backing vocals, bass
- Steve "Basser X" Jin — bass, backing vocals

Early members

- Jason Dooley — drums
- Ryan Murphy — guitars

== Discography ==
Studio albums

- 10 Songs LP/CD (No Idea Records, 1997)

Extended plays

- 4 Songs 12-inch LP (No Idea Records, 1997)
- 2 Songs 7-inch (No Idea Records, 2000)
- 3 Songs 12-inch (No Idea Records, 2005)

Split records

- Split LP with Twelve Hour Turn (No Idea Records, 1998)
- Split 7-inch with Strikeforce Diablo (Fragile Records, 1998)

Unreleased albums

- 15 Songs CD (No Idea Records, TBA) (Scheduled to be released April 2005, said to collect all tracks not found on the Ten Songs CD. No word on an actual release date.)

Compilation appearances

- 403 Chaos Comp: Florida Fucking Hardcore – "Caught In A Flood With The Captain Of The Cheerleading Squad" (Schematics Records, 1998)
- Bread: The Edible Napkin – "Less Than Nothing" (No Idea Records, 1998)
- Back To Donut! – "...And Keep Reaching For Those Stars" (No Idea Records, 1999)
- The First Crush Compilation – "This Isn't the Tenka-Ichi-Budokai" (Thick as Thieves Records, 1998)
- ABC No Rio Benefit – "Darren's Roof", "Drama in the Emergency Room" (Level Plane Records, 1999)
- No Idea 100: Redefiling Music – "Care" (originally performed by Spoke) (No Idea Records, 2001)
