= Isonade =

Japanese mythological creature

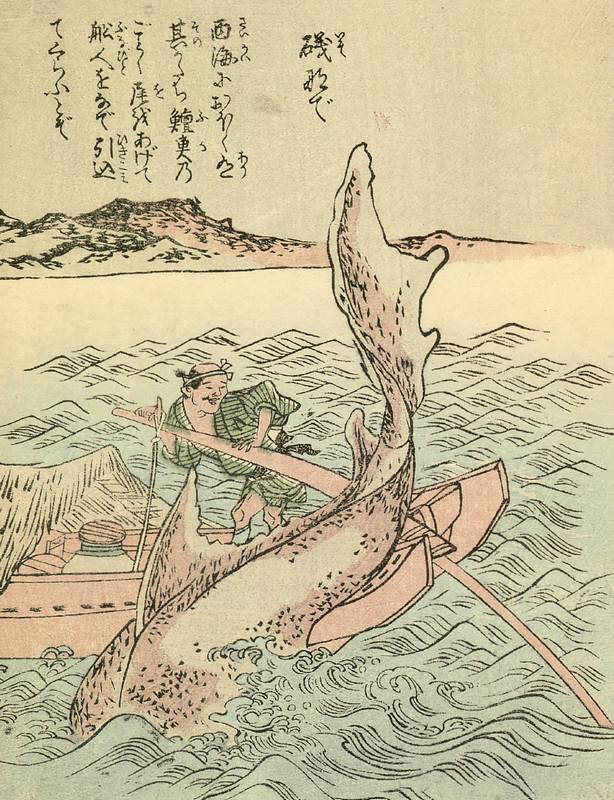
The isonade as depicted in Takehara Shunsen's Ehon Hyaku Monogatari

The Isonade (磯撫で; "beach stroker") is an enormous, shark-like sea monster said to live off the coast of Matsuura and other places in Western Japan.

== Description ==
According to the Ehon Hyaku Monogatari, its body has never been seen, as it is always "hidden beneath the waves, save for its huge tail fin which is covered in small barbs." In theory:

It approaches boats stealthily and uses its hooked tail to snare sailors and drag them into the sea, where it devours them. When it appears, fierce winds blow. It may also simply use its tail to capsize boats, or strike the beach with its tail and kill people there.
