= Michael Foster (folklorist) =

American folklorist and professor of Japanese culture

Michael Dylan Foster
- Occupations: Professor, folklorist, author
- Awards: Chicago Folklore Prize (2009)

Academic background
- Education: Wesleyan University (BA English); University of California, Berkeley (MA Asian Studies); Stanford University (PhD Japanese)

Academic work
- Institutions: University of California, Davis (2016–present); Indiana University Bloomington (2008–2016); University of California, Riverside
- Notable works: Pandemonium and Parade (2009); The Book of Yōkai (2015); The Folkloresque (2016)

Michael Dylan Foster is an American folklorist, professor, and author specializing in Japanese folklore, literature, and popular culture. He is a professor of Japanese and Chair of the Department of East Asian Languages and Cultures at the University of California, Davis.

== Education ==
Foster earned his Bachelor of Arts degree in English from Wesleyan University. He received his Master of Arts in Asian Studies from the University of California, Berkeley, where his interest in folklore as an academic discipline developed. He completed his PhD in Japanese from Stanford University.

During his graduate studies, Foster conducted intensive language study in Yokohama, Japan, and studied History and Folklore at Kanagawa University.

== Academic career ==
Foster began his academic career at the University of California, Riverside, where he taught in the Department of Comparative Literature and Foreign Languages. He taught Japanese language, literature, folklore, and film.

In 2008, he joined Indiana University Bloomington, serving in the Department of Folklore and Ethnomusicology for eight years. During his tenure at Indiana, his research on Japanese folklore and supernatural creatures gained recognition.

In 2016, Foster joined the faculty at the University of California, Davis, where he is currently Professor of Japanese and Chair of the Department of East Asian Languages and Cultures. He teaches courses on Japanese folklore, heritage, tourism, and popular culture.

== Research and scholarship ==
=== Yōkai studies ===
Foster is recognized as a leading Western scholar of yōkai, the supernatural creatures and phenomena of Japanese folklore. His first major book, Pandemonium and Parade: Japanese Monsters and the Culture of Yōkai (2009), is a cultural history that traces the understanding of the mysterious within both academic discourses and popular practices from the seventeenth century through the present. The book received the Chicago Folklore Prize from the American Folklore Society in 2009.

His second book, The Book of Yōkai: Mysterious Creatures of Japanese Folklore (2015), explores the roots and meanings of various yōkai and introduces scholars who have studied and catalogued these creatures. The book was described by the Times Literary Supplement as creating "engagingly rich portraits of yōkai" with illustrations that make it "a delight for researchers, enthusiasts and the uninitiated alike." A second expanded edition was published in 2024.

=== The Folkloresque ===
Foster coined the term "folkloresque" to describe how media uses the authority and cultural flavor of folklore to endow popular culture products with a sense of authenticity or connection to tradition. He co-edited The Folkloresque: Reframing Folklore in a Popular Culture World (2016) with Jeffrey A. Tolbert, exploring this concept in depth.

=== Ethnographic fieldwork ===
For over two decades, Foster has conducted long-term ethnographic research on ritual, festival, and tourism in Japan. His fieldwork has focused on the Namahage festival in Oga City, Akita Prefecture, and the Toshidon ritual on the island of Shimo-Koshikijima in Kagoshima Prefecture. Both are New Year's Eve festivals featuring young men dressed as demon deities who visit houses to frighten children.

== Media work ==
Since 2022, Foster has served as host and navigator for the NHK World television series Yōkai: Exploring Hidden Japanese Folklore, which focuses on rural yōkai traditions and legends. The series is available for streaming on NHK World.

== Selected publications ==
=== Books ===
- Pandemonium and Parade: Japanese Monsters and the Culture of Yōkai. University of California Press, 2009. ISBN 978-0-520-25361-2
- The Book of Yōkai: Mysterious Creatures of Japanese Folklore. University of California Press, 2015. ISBN 978-0-520-27101-2
- (Co-editor with Jeffrey A. Tolbert) The Folkloresque: Reframing Folklore in a Popular Culture World. Utah State University Press, 2016. ISBN 978-1-60732-418-8
- (Co-editor) UNESCO on the Ground: Local Perspectives on Intangible Cultural Heritage. Indiana University Press, 2015.
- (Co-editor) Matsuri and Religion: Complexity, Continuity, and Creativity in Japanese Festivals. 2021.
- Japanese Supernatural Tales: Encounters with Yokai, Ghosts, Demons, and Other Strange Phenomena, from the Kojiki and The Tale of Genji to Dazai and Murakami, Penguin Classics, 2026.

=== Selected articles ===
- "The Challenge of the Folkloresque." In The Folkloresque: Reframing Folklore in a Popular Culture World, pp. 3–22. Utah State University Press, 2016.
- "UNESCO on the Ground." Journal of Folklore Research 52, no. 2-3 (May–December 2015): 143–156.
- "Imagined UNESCOs: Interpreting Intangible Cultural Heritage on a Japanese Island." Journal of Folklore Research 52, no. 2-3 (May–December 2015): 217–232.
- "Haunted Travelogue: Hometowns, Ghost Towns, and Memories of War." Mechademia 4.1 (2009): 164–181.
- "The Question of the Slit-Mouthed Woman: Contemporary Legend, the Beauty Industry, and Women's Weekly Magazines in Japan." Signs: Journal of Women in Culture and Society 32, no. 3 (Spring 2007): 699–726. doi:10.1086/510542
- "Strange Games and Enchanted Science: The Mystery of Kokkuri." The Journal of Asian Studies 65, no. 2 (May 2006): 251–275.
- "The Metamorphosis of the Kappa: Transformation of Folklore to Folklorism in Japan." Asian Folklore Studies 57 (Fall 1998): 1–24.

=== Short fiction ===
Foster has also published creative work, including short stories in literary journals:

- "Sepia." Southern Humanities Review 29, no. 4 (1995): 345–359. (Winner of Hoepfner Award for best short story)
- "Toothpicks." Northwest Review 30, no. 2 (1992): 59–66.
- "Looking Back." Greensboro Review 67 (Spring 2000): 107–115.

== Awards and honors ==
- Chicago Folklore Prize, American Folklore Society, 2009
- Hoepfner Award for best short story, Southern Humanities Review, 1995
