= 10 Songs (I Hate Myself album) =

Studio album by I Hate Myself
- Released: 1997; September 2000 (reissue)
- Recorded: June 1997
- Studio: Turd Studios
- Genre: Emo, post-hardcore
- Length: 36:24
- Label: No Idea
- Producer: Rob McGregor

I Hate Myself chronology
4 Songs (1996)	10 Songs (1997)	2 Songs (2000)

Professional ratings
Review scores
Source	Rating
Punknews.org	4/5 stars

10 Songs is the second LP by American emo band I Hate Myself, released in the year 1997. It is the most well known album by the band. It was re-released on CD with "To a Husband at War" as a bonus track in 2000. The song originally appeared on the band's split 7-inch with Strikeforce Diablo.

== Track listing ==
1. "This Isn't the Tenka-Ichi-Budôkai" – 3:33
2. "Urban Barbie" – 1:56
3. "Polar Bear Summer" – 4:06
4. "...And Keep Reaching for Those Stars" – 3:11
5. "Caught in a Flood with the Captain of the Cheerleading Squad " – 3:26
6. "Kind of a Long Way Down" – 1:51
7. "Not Waving But Drowning" – 3:49
8. "Destroy All Monsters" – 3:27
9. "To a Husband at War" – 3:12
10. "Conversation with Dr. Seussicide" – 6:19
11. "Secret Lovers at the Heaven's Gate Ranch" – 1:35

== Personnel ==
- Jim Marburger – vocals, guitar
- Jon Marburger – drums
- Steve Jin – bass
- Mike Taylor – cover artwork
- Steve Heritage – mastering
- Rob McGergor – recording
