= Photoanimation =

Filmmaking technique

Photograph of downtown Rochester shows two of the scene plots used in the film: a zoom to horizon and pan across, and a street-corner zoom from medium close-up. Verticals, diagonal pans, up-zooms and other combinations were used to abstract several scenes from a few 4X5 color transparencies taken by aerial photographer---effectively simulating smooth helicopter and aircraft cinematography at a fraction of the cost.

Photoanimation is a filmmaking technique in which still photos, artwork or other objects are filmed with the use of an animation stand.

Photoanimation techniques have been used from the very early days of motion pictures. Hollywood often leaned on this less expensive technique for some of its movie trailers in the classical era.

== Usage ==
(LEFT) Animation planner Francis Lee reviews bar-sheet as producer-director Raúl daSilva determines scene design plotting. A recorder was used for play-back of sound mix simultaneously transferred from master track along with 35mm magnetic film and 16mm reserve transfers. (Right) Max Seligman or New York's Tele-Craft analyzes mix on 35mm magnetic film transfer, breaking down music changes, phrases, to frame numbers. Analysis is the step prior to exposure sheet plotting for the Oxberry shooting.

In making such films the soundtrack is first produced, analyzed and bar sheets made depicting the soundtrack details. Exposure sheets for filming (camera exposures) are then extracted from the bar sheets.

From the 1980s on, documentary filmmaker Ken Burns popularized a simpler, less complex form of photoanimation later called the Ken Burns effect.
