= 1973 in animation =

Events in 1973 in animation.

== Events ==
=== January ===
- January 2: The first episode of Demetan Croaker, The Boy Frog is broadcast.
- January 6: The first episode of Schoolhouse Rock! is broadcast.
- January 24: The Brazilian animated film Piconzé is first released.

=== February ===
- February 5: The first episode of The Wombles is broadcast.
- February 22: The film Charlotte's Web is first released, based on the eponymous novel by E.B. White.

=== March ===
- March 11: The Peanuts TV special There's No Time for Love, Charlie Brown premieres on CBS. Marcie makes her animated debut in this special.
- March 27: 45th Academy Awards: Richard Williams' A Christmas Carol wins the Academy Award for Best Animated Short.

=== May ===
- May 3: The film János Vitéz (Johnny Corncob) is first released, the first Hungarian animated feature film, based on the eponymous epic poem by Sándor Petőfi, and directed by Marcell Jankovics.

=== July ===
- July 31: The Russian film Adventures of Mowgli premieres.

=== August ===
- August 8:
  - The first episode of Doraemon is broadcast, based on the eponymous manga series. This adaptation became rarely seen after the broadcast of the longer-running 1979 relaunch as mandated by Shogakukan to protect the reputation of the relaunch. However, later episodes were recovered by IMAGICA in the 1990s. A clip from one of the episodes was spotted in a pornographic Japanese movie.
  - Ralph Bakshi releases Heavy Traffic.

=== September ===
- September 8:
  - The first episode of Star Trek: The Animated Series is broadcast, with the original cast of Star Trek: The Original Series voicing their original characters.
  - The first episode of Super Friends is broadcast.

=== October ===
- October 13: The first episode of Cutie Honey is broadcast.

=== November ===
- November 8: The Walt Disney Company releases Robin Hood, directed by Wolfgang Reitherman.
- November 20: The Peanuts thanksgiving TV special A Charlie Brown Thanksgiving premieres.

=== December ===
- December 6: René Laloux and Roland Topor's Fantastic Planet premieres.
- December 12: Roberto Gavioli and Rolf Kauka's Once Upon a Time is first released.

=== Specific date unknown ===
- Gibba's pornographic animated feature film Il Nano e la Strega (King Dick) is released.

== Films released ==
- January 6 - Luvcast U.S.A. (United States)
- January 13 - That Girl in Wonderland (United States)
- January 24 - Piconzé (Brazil)
- February 7 - The Incredible, Indelible, Magical, Physical, Mystery Trip (United States)
- March 1 - Charlotte's Web (United States)
- March 17 - The Panda's Great Adventure (Japan)
- April 19 - Johnny in the Valley of the Giants (France)
- May 1 - Johnny Corncob (Hungary)
- May 11 - Fantastic Planet (Czechoslovakia and France)
- June 9 - Magic Adventure (Spain)
- June 30 - Belladonna of Sadness (Japan and France)
- July 12 - Walt Disney's 50th Anniversary Show (United States)
- July 18 - Mazinger Z vs. Devilman (Japan)
- July 31 - Adventures of Mowgli (Soviet Union)
- August 8:
  - Heavy Traffic (United States)
  - Man: The Polluter (Canada and Yugoslavia)
- September 8 - Lost in Space (United States)
- September 12 - The Adventures of Hijitus (Argentina)
- September 23 - The Count of Monte Cristo (United States and Australia)
- October 22 - Kidnapped (Australia)
- October 27 - The Mini-Munsters (United States)
- October 28 - The Swiss Family Robinson (Australia)
- November 8 - Robin Hood (United States)
- November 17 - Nanny and the Professor and the Phantom of the Circus (United States)
- November 22 - Twenty Thousand Leagues Under the Sea (United States and Australia)
- November 23 - The Three Musketeers (United States and Australia)
- December - Marco (United States and Japan)
- December 2 - The Black Arrow (Australia)
- December 9 - Treasure Island (United States)
- December 12 - Once Upon a Time (Italy and Germany)
- Specific date unknown:
  - 20,000 Leagues Under the Sea (United States)
  - Little 8th Route Army (China)
  - The Adventures of Barbapapa (Italy)

== Television series ==
- January 1 - Babel II debuts on TV Asahi and ATV.
- January 2 - Demetan Croaker, The Boy Frog debuts on Fuji TV.
- January 6 - Schoolhouse Rock! debuts on ABC.
- January 7 - Fables of the Green Forest debuts on Fuji TV.
- February 5 - Wombles debuts on BBC1.
- March 2 - Jungle Kurobe debuts on TV Asahi.
- April 1 - Doraemon debuts on Nippon TV.
- April 2 - Little Wansa debuts on Kansai Telecasting Corporation.
- April 4 - Kôya No Shônen Isamu debuts on Fuji TV.
- April 7 - Microsuperman debuts on TV Asahi.
- July 3 - Sally and Jake debuts on ITV.
- September - The Kingdom of Could Be You debuts on CBS.
- September 8:
  - Bailey's Comets, Jeannie, My Favorite Martians, and Speed Buggy debut on CBS.
  - Butch Cassidy, Emergency +4, Inch High, Private Eye, Star Trek: The Animated Series, and The Addams Family debut on NBC.
  - Goober and the Ghost Chasers, Mission: Magic!, Super Friends, and Yogi's Gang debut on ABC.
- October 1:
  - Miracle Shoujo Limit-chan debuts on TV Asahi.
  - Zero Tester debuts on FNS.
- October 2 - Casshan debuts on Fuji TV.
- October 3 - Karate Baka Ichidai debuts on NET.
- October 4 - Dororon Enma-kun debuts on Fuji TV.
- October 5 - Ace o Nerae! debuts on MBS.
- October 6 - Bôken Korobokkuru debuts on Yomiuri TV.
- October 7 - Samurai Giants debuts on Yomiuri TV.
- October 13 - Cutie Honey debuts on TV Asahi.

== Births ==
=== January ===
- January 3: Dan Harmon, American writer (Monster House), producer, actor and comedian (co-creator of and voice of MC Haps, Birdperson, and Mr. Nimbus in Rick and Morty).
- January 13: Jarod Daetwiler, American background artist (Film Roman) and prop designer (The Simpsons).
- January 14: Katie Griffin, Canadian actress (voice of Sailor Mars in the original English dub of Sailor Moon, continued voice of Alex in Totally Spies).
- January 17: Bob Persichetti, American animator (Walt Disney Animation Studios), storyboard artist (DreamWorks Animation), writer (The Little Prince) and director (Spider-Man: Into the Spider-Verse).
- January 25: Geoff Johns, American comic book writer, screenwriter and film and television producer (Justice League Unlimited, Titan Maximum, Robot Chicken, Green Lantern: Emerald Knights, Justice League: The Flashpoint Paradox).

=== February ===
- February 5: Danielle Koenig, American television writer (Invader Zim, Disney Television Animation, WordGirl, Abby Hatcher, Chuggington) and script coordinator (Invader Zim).
- February 8: Tokuyoshi Kawashima, Japanese voice actor (Japanese dub voice of Terry McGinnis in the DC Animated Universe, Rex in Isle of Dogs, and Baymax in Big Hero 6).
- February 9:
  - Makoto Shinkai, Japanese animator, filmmaker, author, and manga artist (5 Centimeters per Second, Your Name).
  - Shaun Parkes, English actor, (voice of Tortoise in Tinga Tinga Tales).
- February 12: Tara Strong, Canadian-American voice actress (voice of Bubbles in The Powerpuff Girls, Dil Pickles in Rugrats, Barbara Gordon/Batgirl in the DC Animated Universe, Beware the Batman, Teen Titans Go!, DC Super Hero Girls, and Batman: The Killing Joke, Timmy Turner and Poof in The Fairly OddParents, Melody in The Little Mermaid II: Return to the Sea, young Ben Tennyson in the Ben 10 franchise, Twilight Sparkle in My Little Pony: Friendship Is Magic, Raven in Teen Titans and Teen Titans Go!, Dannan O'Mallard and Molly Winks in Jakers! The Adventures of Piggley Winks, Toot Braunstein and Princess Clara in Drawn Together, Truffles in Chowder, Daizy in Wow! Wow! Wubbzy!, Angel in the Lilo & Stitch franchise, Katia in Bratz, Ashi in Samurai Jack, the title character in Unikitty!, Harley Quinn in DC Super Hero Girls, Ember McLain in Danny Phantom, Bebe and Cece Proud in The Proud Family, Lena Dupree in Scooby-Doo on Zombie Island).
- February 14: Alec Sulkin, American writer, producer, and voice actor (Family Guy, The Cleveland Show).
- February 21: Christopher Yost, American television writer (Marvel Animation, Teenage Mutant Ninja Turtles).

=== March ===
- March 3: Ólafur Darri Ólafsson, Icelandic actor (voice of Ragnar in How to Train Your Dragon: The Hidden World, The Archer in The Dark Crystal: Age of Resistance).
- March 18: Luci Christian, American voice actress and ADR script writer (voice of Kaname Chidori in Full Metal Panic!, Asuna Kagurazaka in Negima, Nami in One Piece, Ochaco Uraraka in My Hero Academia, Wrath in Fullmetal Alchemist, Little in RWBY).
- March 20: Cedric Yarbrough, American actor and comedian (voice of Tom DuBois and Colonel Stinkmeaner in The Boondocks, Officer X in The Penguins of Madagascar, Firestorm and Black Lightning in Justice League: Crisis on Two Earths, Chocolate Giddy-Up in Black Dynamite, Officer Meow-Meow Fuzzyface in BoJack Horseman, Eagle Scout in New Looney Tunes, Gerald Fitzgerald in Paradise PD, Khone in Milo Murphy's Law, Nelson in Blaze and the Monster Machines).
- March 22: Clay Kaytis, American animator and film director (Walt Disney Animation Studios, The Angry Birds Movie, Peanuts).
- March 24:
  - Jim Parsons, American actor (voice of Oh in Home, Milton Feltwaddle in Pound Puppies, Buddy in Elf: Buddy's Musical Christmas, Nightmare in The Super Hero Squad Show episode "Blind Rage Knows No Color!", Draven in the Glenn Martin, DDS episode "Jackie's Get-Rich-Quick Scheme", Henry Applesauce in The High Fructose Adventures of Annoying Orange episode "Generic Holiday Special", Larry Wilder in the Kick Buttowski: Suburban Daredevil episode "Jack Wilder's Nature Camp", Mr. Skibumpers in the SuperMansion episode "SuperMansion: War on Christmas", himself in The Simpsons episode "Frinkcoin").
  - Sakura Tange, Japanese voice actress, singer and writer (voice of Sakura Kinomoto in Cardcaptor Sakura).
  - Matt Sloan, American voice actor (voice of Darth Vader in Lego Star Wars).

=== April ===
- April 6: Cindy Robinson, American voice actress Amy Rose in the 'Sonic the Hedgehog' series and Makoto Nanaya in the 'BlazBlue' series.
- April 8: Dan Lin, American film producer (The Lego Movie).
- April 16: Hirofumi Nojima, Japanese voice actor (voice of Yusaka Kitamura in Toradora!, Volkner in Pokémon, dub voice of Chip in Chip 'n Dale: Rescue Rangers and Jason Rusch in Batman: The Brave and the Bold).
- April 19: David Soren, Canadian director, writer, voice actor, and storyboard artist (DreamWorks Animation).
- April 21: Katsuyuki Konishi, Japanese voice actor (voice of Kamina in Gurren Lagann, Laxus Dreyar in Fairy Tail, Tanktop Master in One Punch Man, Keigo Asano and Shuhei Hisagi in Bleach, Diavolo in JoJo's Bizarre Adventure: Golden Wind, Jonathan Joestar in Phantom Blood).
- April 22: Christopher Sabat, American voice actor and director (Funimation).
- April 23: Cem Yılmaz, Turkish actor (Turkish dub voice of Barry B. Benson in Bee Movie and Nick Wilde in Zootopia).
- April 28: Jorge Garcia, American actor (voice of Ricardo in The Wild Thornberrys episode "Spirited Away", Dog Trainer Hero in the Higglytown Heroes episode "Me and My Shadow", Rodrigo in the Phineas and Ferb episode "Minor Monogram").

=== May ===
- May 12: Robert Tinkler, Canadian voice actor (voice of Crimson Rubeus in the DIC dub of Sailor Moon, Max in The Adventures of Sam & Max: Freelance Police, Bill Anaconda, Mark Anaconda and Derek Anaconda in Angela Anaconda, Delete in Cyberchase, the title character in Pelswick, Daniel in Jacob Two-Two, Grub in Miss Spider's Sunny Patch Friends, Steggy in Harry and His Bucket Full of Dinosaurs, Fish in The Cat in the Hat Knows a Lot About That!, Howie in Almost Naked Animals, Chunk in The ZhuZhus, continued voice of Woodstock in the Peanuts franchise) and television writer (Nelvana, League of Super Evil, Endangered Species, Julius Jr., Dot.).
- May 16: Tori Spelling, American actress (voice of Pirate Princess in Jake and the Never Land Pirates, April in Izzie's Way Home, Romana Parmesana in the Biker Mice from Mars episode "Hit the Road, Jack", Kim in the American Dad! episode "Stan Knows Best", Gina Michaels in the Rick & Steve: The Happiest Gay Couple in All the World episode "The Only Straight in the Village").
- May 20: Kaya Yanar, German Stand-up comedian and actor (Turkish dub voice of Papagei Dienstag/Mak in Robinson Crusoe, and Subisha Gulab Deepak in Dragon Rider).
- May 25: Demetri Martin, American actor and comedian (voice of Ice Bear in We Bare Bears, Narrator in We Baby Bears).
- May 27: Jack McBrayer, American actor and comedian (voice of Wander in Wander Over Yonder, Fix-it Felix Jr. in Wreck-It Ralph and Ralph Breaks the Internet, Irving in Phineas and Ferb, Clumsy Smurf in Smurfs: The Lost Village, Toadie in Amphibia).
- May 30: Minae Noji, Japanese-American actress (voice of Tomoe Tsurugi in Miraculous: Tales of Ladybug & Cat Noir, Brittney Wong in Star vs. the Forces of Evil, Ayako in the BoJack Horseman episode "BoJack Hates the Troops").

=== June ===
- June 1: Heidi Klum, German-American model, television host, producer, and businesswoman (voice of Heidi in Littlest Pet Shop, Jade in Arctic Dogs).
- June 2: Kevin Feige, American film and television producer (Marvel Animation, What If...?, voice of Chinnos in The Simpsons episode "Bart the Bad Guy").
- June 13:
  - Ogie Banks, American voice actor (voice of Clawd Wolf in Monster High, Karashi in Naruto, Omoi and Durui in Naruto Shippuden, Dylan in Bratz, Luke Cage and Miles Morales in Ultimate Spider-Man, Scooter in Muppet Babies, Zak Saturday in the Ben 10: Omniverse episode "T.G.I.S.").
  - Carson Kugler, American animator, storyboard artist (Nickelodeon Animation Studio, Disney Television Animation, Stuart Little, Party Wagon, Tom and Jerry: Blast Off to Mars), background artist (SpongeBob SquarePants), writer (Fish Hooks) and director (Hey Arnold!: The Movie).
- June 15: Neil Patrick Harris, American actor (voice of Max in Capitol Critters, Spider-Man in Spider-Man: The New Animated Series, Dr. Blowhole in The Penguins of Madagascar, Steve in Cloudy with a Chance of Meatballs and Cloudy with a Chance of Meatballs 2, Karre in the Star Wars: Visions episode "The Twins", Music Meister in the Batman: The Brave and the Bold episode "Mayhem of the Music Meister!", the title character in the Static Shock episode "Replay", Ray Thompson in the Justice League episode "Legends", Todd Andrews in the Captain Planet and the Planeteers episode "A Formula for Hate", himself in The Simpsons episode "Bart the Murderer").
- June 16: Aaron Ehasz, American screenwriter and television producer (Mission Hill, Futurama, Avatar: The Last Airbender, Sit Down, Shut Up, creator of The Dragon Prince).
- June 17: Nahnatchka Khan, American television producer and writer (Recess, Pepper Ann, Undergrads, What's New, Scooby-Doo?, American Dad!).
- June 19: Dan Fraga, American animator (Mad), storyboard artist (Xiaolin Chronicles), concept artist and director (The Ricky Gervais Show, Mattel Television).
- June 20: Noah Z. Jones, American animator, writer, illustrator and producer (Disney Television Animation, Almost Naked Animals).
- June 30: Noam Zylberman, Canadian voice actor (voice of Bentley Raccoon in The Raccoons, Charles in The Care Bears Family episode "Birthday Bear's Blues", additional voices in Babar).

=== July ===
- July 3: Patrick Wilson, American actor (voice of Jim in the American Dad! episode "Wife Insurance", Everette in the Little Demon episode "Everybody's Dying for the Weekend", himself in the Teen Titans Go! episode "365!").
- July 8: Sebastian Maniscalco, American actor and comedian (voice of Johnny in The Nut Job 2: Nutty by Nature, Spike in The Super Mario Bros. Movie).
- July 10: Hiromasa Yonebayashi, Japanese animator and director (Studio Ghibli).
- July 15: Brian Austin Green, American actor (voice of Human Torch in season 1 of Fantastic Four, Rimfire in Biker Mice from Mars).
- July 18: Hoon Lee, American actor (voice of Splinter in Teenage Mutant Ninja Turtles, Jade Emperor in The Monkey King).
- July 20: Roberto Orci, Mexican-American screenwriter and producer (Transformers: Prime), (d. 2025).
- July 22:
  - Jaime Camil, Mexican actor (voice of Fernando in The Secret Life of Pets, Papá Rivera in Coco, Julio in Elena of Avalor, Panchito Pistoles in Legend of the Three Caballeros, Don Karnage in DuckTales, Globgor in Star vs. the Forces of Evil, Pinguino in The Lion Guard, Jorge Chavez in BoJack Horseman, Spanish dub voice of Elliot in Open Season and Barry B. Benson in Bee Movie).
  - Tiffany Vollmer, American film producer, make-up artist, and voice actress (voice of Bulma in the Dragon Ball franchise).
- July 23: Kathryn Hahn, American actress (voice of Ericka von Helsing in the Hotel Transylvania franchise, Doctor Octopus in Spider-Man: Into the Spider-Verse, Luli in the American Dad! episode "Honey, I'm Homeland", Agatha Harkness in the What If...? episode "What If... Agatha Went to Hollywood?").

=== August ===
- August 1: Tempestt Bledsoe, American actress (voice of Abbey and Claudia in The Replacements, Sheriff Hooper in ParaNorman).
- August 2:
  - Eric Rogers, American television writer (Futurama, Teen Titans Go!, Brickleberry, Wander Over Yonder, Littlest Pet Shop, Stretch Armstrong and the Flex Fighters, Skylanders Academy, Polly Pocket) and production assistant (Futurama).
  - Simon Kinberg, British-born American filmmaker (Star Wars Rebels).
- August 6: David Campbell, Australian singer, actor, and TV personality (voice of David Koalabell in the Australian and New Zealand version of Zootopia, singing voice of Joseph in Joseph: King of Dreams).
- August 9: Kevin McKidd, Scottish actor (voice of Lord MacGuffin in Brave, Batman in Justice League: The Flashpoint Paradox, Reptillus Maximus in Toy Story That Time Forgot, Fenn Rau in Star Wars Rebels).
- August 19: Ahmed Best, American actor, comedian, and musician (voice of Jar Jar Binks in the Star Wars franchise and Robot Chicken, Mouse in Armitage: Dual Matrix, Louis Booker in Kangaroo Jack: G'Day U.S.A.!).
- August 22: Kristen Wiig, American actress and comedienne (voice of Ruffnut Thorston in the How to Train Your Dragon franchise, Miss Hattie and Lucy Wilde in the Despicable Me franchise, Lola Bunny in The Looney Tunes Show, Annie Crawford in The Simpsons episode "Homerland").
- August 24:
  - Grey DeLisle, American voice actress and singer (voice of Emily Elizabeth in Clifford the Big Red Dog, Vicky in The Fairly OddParents, Mandy in The Grim Adventures of Billy & Mandy, Frankie Foster in Foster's Home for Imaginary Friends, Yumi in Hi Hi Puffy AmiYumi, Azula in Avatar: The Last Airbender, Wubbzy in Wow! Wow! Wubbzy!, Riley Daring in The Replacements, Black Canary in Batman: The Brave and the Bold, Captain Marvel in The Super Hero Squad Show, Guardians of the Galaxy and Avengers Assemble, Doctor Holiday in Generator Rex, Aya in Green Lantern: The Animated Series and the Justice League Action episode "Barehanded", Moon Butterfly and Jackie Lynn-Thomas in Star vs. the Forces of Evil, Lana Loud, Lola Loud, and Lily Loud in The Loud House, Wonder Woman, Lois Lane, Giganta and Robin in DC Super Hero Girls, Puppycorn in Unikitty!, Lucretia in Harvey Girls Forever!, Ms. Chalice in The Cuphead Show!, Sam Manson in Danny Phantom, Kitty Katswell in T.U.F.F. Puppy, Lady Redundant Woman and Ms. Question in WordGirl, Betsy in Curious George, Brianna Buttowski in Kick Buttowski, Ice Queen in Adventure Time continued voice of Daphne Blake in Scooby-Doo, and Martin Prince and Sherri and Terri in The Simpsons).
  - Dave Chappelle, American comedian and actor (voice of Spider in the Happily Ever After: Fairy Tales for Every Child episode "Mother Goose: A Rappin' and Rhymin' Special", himself in the Dr. Katz, Professional Therapist episode "Electric Bike").
- August 28: Kirby Morrow, Canadian voice actor, writer and comedian (voice of Cyclops in X-Men: Evolution, Jay in Class of the Titans, Hot Shot in Transformers: Cybertron, Miroku in InuYasha, Van Fanel in the Ocean dub of Escaflowne, Teru Mikami in Death Note, Trowa Barton in Mobile Suit Gundam Wing, Ryo Takatsuki in Project ARMS, Goku in the Ocean dub of Dragon Ball Z (from Episode 160 onwards), Cole in Ninjago), (d. 2020).
- August 29: Jason Spisak, American actor (voice of Kid Flash in Young Justice, Razer in Green Lantern: The Animated Series and the Young Justice episode "Encounter Upon the Razor's Edge!", Justin Hammer in Avengers Assemble, Grandmaster in Guardians of the Galaxy, Alistair Smythe and Scorpion in Spider-Man, Green Lantern in DC Super Hero Girls, Gatorboy in the Ben 10 episode "Ready to Rumble").

=== September ===
- September 3: Aaron Springer, American television writer and animator (SpongeBob SquarePants, Samurai Jack, Mickey Mouse, Gravity Falls, creator of and voice of Billy in Billy Dilley's Super-Duper Subterranean Summer).
- September 4: Jason David Frank, American actor and martial artist (voice of the Emissary in Transformers: Titans Return, Silver Bear in the We Bare Bears episode "Imaginary Friend"), (d. 2022).
- September 9: Brian Dobson, Canadian actor (voice of Thing in Fantastic Four: World's Greatest Heroes, Skeletor in He-Man and the Masters of the Universe, Lex Luthor in Krypto the Superdog, Red Alert in Transformers: Armada and Transformers: Cybertron, Majin Buu and Dr. Gero in the Ocean dub of Dragon Ball Z, Muso in Inuyasha).
- September 13: Travis Knight, American animator, producer, director, and former rapper (Laika).
- September 14: Andrew Lincoln, English actor (voice of Rick Grimes in the Robot Chicken episode "The Robot Chicken Walking Dead Special: Look Who's Walking").
- September 18:
  - Ami Onuki, Japanese singer, musician, and member of Puffy AmiYumi (portrayed herself in the live-action segments of Hi Hi Puffy AmiYumi, performed the theme songs of Teen Titans and Hi Hi Puffy AmiYumi).
  - James Marsden, American actor (portrayed and voiced Prince Edward in Enchanted and Disenchanted, voice of Hitch Trailblazer in My Little Pony: A New Generation, Tim Templeton in The Boss Baby: Family Business, Prince Ishitsukuri in The Tale of the Princess Kaguya, Sir Brad Starlight in Wander Over Yonder).
- September 20: Tom Root, American writer, producer, and actor (Robot Chicken, SuperMansion).
- September 29: Brad Kane, American singer (singing voice of Aladdin in the Aladdin franchise).

=== October ===
- October 1: Christian Borle, American actor (voice of Slickwell in the Sofia the First episode "Baileywhoops", Rusty Topsail in the Vampirina episode "Treasure Haunters", Father Francis in the Rapunzel's Tangled Adventure episode "Freebird", Vox in Hazbin Hotel).
- October 3:
  - Lena Headey, English actress (voice of Morgana le Fay in the Tales of Arcadia franchise, Amelia in Infinity Train, Aunt Grandma in Uncle Grandpa, Evil-Lyn in Masters of the Universe: Revelation, Big Mama in Rise of the Teenage Mutant Ninja Turtles, Jeopardy Mouse in Danger Mouse, Lunafreya Nox Fleuret in Kingsglaive: Final Fantasy XV, Lara in DC League of Super-Pets, Black Widow and Mystique in The Super Hero Squad Show episode "Deadly Is the Black Widow's Bite!").
  - Richard Ian Cox, Welsh-born Canadian actor, comedian, and online radio host (voice of the title character in Inuyasha, Ranma Saotome in seasons 4-7 of Ranma ½, Snails in My Little Pony: Friendship Is Magic, Ian Kelley in Being Ian, Kevin Reynolds in Supernoobs, Quicksilver in X-Men: Evolution).
  - Neve Campbell, Canadian actress (voice of Kiara in The Lion King II: Simba's Pride, Cassandra in The Simpsons episode "Rednecks and Broomsticks").
- October 4: Octavio E. Rodriguez, American animator, storyboard artist (Nickelodeon Animation Studio, Pixar, Tom and Jerry: The Magic Ring, Johnny Bravo, Megas XLR, Jackie Chan Adventures, The Happy Elf, Drawn Together, Disney Television Animation, The Spectacular Spider-Man, Transformers: Prime) and director (The Epic Tales of Captain Underpants, Ron's Gone Wrong).
- October 6: Ioan Gruffudd, Welsh actor (voice of Thomas Morrow in Justice League: War, Mister Miracle in the Justice League Unlimited episode "The Ties That Bind", Devin Levin in the Ben 10: Ultimate Alien episode "Vendetta", Prince Charles in the Family Guy episode "Family Guy Viewer Mail 2").
- October 9: Steve Burns, American actor, television host, singer and musician (first host of Blue's Clues).
- October 10: Mario Lopez, American actor (voice of Stitches in The Chica Show, Cruz in Elena of Avalor, Social Smurf in The Smurfs 2, A.C. Slater in the Robot Chicken episode "Boo Cocky", himself in the Family Guy episode "Oscars Guy").
- October 13: Hidetaka Tenjin, Japanese cartoonist and illustrator (Macross, Space Battleship Yamato).
- October 14: Yukie Maeda, Japanese voice actress (voice of Alpha Q in Transformers: Energon, Onsen Tamago and Sachiyo Matsumoto in Love Hina), (d. 2026).
- October 26: Seth MacFarlane, American animator, storyboard artist (Hanna-Barbera), producer, screenwriter (Jungle Cubs, Hanna-Barbera, Ace Ventura: Pet Detective), and voice actor (voice of Manotaur in Yin Yang Yo!, Intelligent Smart Robotic Animated Eraser Lady in The Drawn Together Movie: The Movie!, Mike in Sing, Wayne the Brain in the Aqua Teen Hunger Force episode "Super Trivia", Max in the 3-South episode "Cocktail", Scott, Bird Foreman and Mr. Magician in the Johnny Bravo episode "My Funny Looking Friend", Jeff McGarland in the Phineas and Ferb episode "Nerds of a Feather", Ben in The Simpsons episode "Dangers on a Train", creator and voice of Peter Griffin, Stewie Griffin, Brian Griffin, Glenn Quagmire and other various characters in Family Guy, co-creator and voice of Stan Smith and Roger Smith in American Dad!, and Tim the Bear in The Cleveland Show).
- October 30: Kemp Powers, American filmmaker and playwright (Soul, Spider-Man: Across the Spider-Verse).
- October 31: Ethan Banville, American production assistant (The Cleveland Show), television producer and writer (WordGirl, Grojband, WildBrain Studios, Nerds and Monsters, George of the Jungle, Corn & Peg, co-creator of Oddballs).

=== November ===
- November 4: Steven Ogg, Canadian actor (voice of Professor Venomous, Shadowy Figure, and Laserblast in OK K.O.! Let's Be Heroes).
- November 9:
  - Alyson Court, Canadian actress (voice of Jubilee in X-Men: The Animated Series, Lydia Deetz in Beetlejuice, Nora in Timothy Goes to School, Malani in Ewoks, Queen Martha in Mike the Knight).
  - Ridd Sorensen, Canadian animator, storyboard artist (Rudolph the Red-Nosed Reindeer and the Island of Misfit Toys), character designer (Rudolph the Red-Nosed Reindeer and the Island of Misfit Toys, Johnny Test, Nerds and Monsters), background artist (Johnny Test), prop designer (Rudolph the Red-Nosed Reindeer and the Island of Misfit Toys, Nerds and Monsters), color stylist (Captain Flamingo, Johnny Test, Pound Puppies), art director (WildBrain Studios), writer (Atomic Betty) and director (Atomic Betty, WildBrain Studios).
- November 11: Chris McKay, American filmmaker and animator (Robot Chicken, Morel Orel, The Lego Movie franchise).
- November 14:
  - Dana Snyder, American actor (voice of Master Shake in Aqua Teen Hunger Force, Alchemist in The Venture Bros., Granny Cuyler in Squidbillies, Gazpacho in Chowder, Plastic Man and Penguin in Justice League Action, Dr. Greyman in OK K.O.! Let's Be Heroes, Scratch in The Ghost and Molly McGee).
  - Judah Miller, American filmmaker, television producer, writer, and voice actor (Clone High, King of the Hill, American Dad!).
  - Mikey Kelley, American voice actor (voice of Silver Surfer in The Super Hero Squad Show, Takeshi in When Marnie Was There, Skylar in Shorty McShorts' Shorts, Dom in The Adventures of Puss in Boots, Gee in Kulipari, Higgins in Elena of Avalor).
- November 24: Seonna Hong, American background artist (Nickelodeon Animation Studio, Sony Pictures Animation, Teacher's Pet, Mission Hill, Happiness Is a Warm Blanket, Charlie Brown, Kick Buttowski: Suburban Daredevil, Sym-Bionic Titan, The Ricky Gervais Show, Scooby-Doo! Mystery Incorporated, Wander Over Yonder, Hair Love) and art director (The Mighty B!, Allen Gregory).
- November 29: Gerry Duggan, American comic book and television writer (Kappa Mikey, Speed Racer: The Next Generation).

=== December ===
- December 1:
  - Taesoo Kim, American animator, prop designer (Constant Payne, Invader Zim, The Spectacular Spider-Man, Warner Bros. Animation, Family Guy), art director (Constant Payne) and overseas supervisor (Cool World, Xilam, Ren & Stimpy "Adult Party Cartoon", The Haunted World of El Superbeasto, Dante's Inferno: An Animated Epic, Dan Vs., Jeff & Some Aliens).
  - Lombardo Boyar, American actor (voice of Lars Rodriguez in Rocket Power, Raul in Happy Feet and Happy Feet Two, Plaza Mariachi and Gustavo in Coco, Chaz Divini in the Biker Mice from Mars episode "Between Rump and a Hard Race").
- December 3:
  - Bruno Campos, Brazilian-American lawyer and former actor (voice of Prince Naveen in The Princess and the Frog).
  - Hilary Haag, American voice actress (voice of Nene Romanova in Bubblegum Crisis Tokyo 2040, Rosette Christopher in Chrono Crusade, Seth in Trinity Blood, Ryo Hayakawa in Princess Nine, Karinka in Steel Angel Kurumi, Teletha Testarossa in Full Metal Panic!, the title character in Super Milk Chan, Satsuki Miyanoshita in Ghost Stories, Patty Lowell in Devil May Cry: The Animated Series).
- December 4: Tyra Banks, American television personality, model, businesswoman, producer, actress and writer (voice of Victoria's Secret Gown in Eight Crazy Nights, Barbie Q. Pepper in the Happily Ever After: Fairy Tales for Every Child episode "The Three Little Pigs").
- December 27: Wilson Cruz, American actor (voice of Romeo in The Casagrandes, Mr. Calderon in Moon Girl and Devil Dinosaur).
- December 28: Shawn Harrison, American actor (voice of Timber Wolf and Ron-Karr in Legion of Super Heroes).

=== Specific date unknown ===
- Mike B. Anderson, American animator, producer, and voice actor (The Simpsons, Duckman, The Oblongs).
- Ashley Paige Albert, American voice actress (voice of Tiffany Blum-Deckler, Ms. Janet Barch and Tatiana in Daria, Mina Shizui in Mystery of the Necronomicon, Lizzy and Invisilizzy in Mighty Bug 5, Little Voice in Happy!, Storm Goddess in the Courage the Cowardly Dog episode "Stormy Weather", Wendy 'Pubes' Jane Smith in the Hey Joel episode "Tattoos and Taboos", Pamela Anderson in the Celebrity Deathmatch episode "Deathbowl '98", additional voices in The Wrong Coast, Chico and Rita, Bubble Guppies, Ice Age: Continental Drift and Epic).

== Deaths ==
=== February ===
- February 15: Wally Cox, American actor (voice of the title character in Underdog), dies at age 48.

=== March ===
- March 6: Aleksandr Ptushko, Russian animator and film director (The New Gulliver, The Stone Flower, Sadko, The Tale of Tsar Saltan, Ruslan and Ludmila), dies at age 72.
- March 7: Verena Ruegg, American animator, camerawoman, and painter, (worked in the ink and paint department of both the Walt Disney Studios and Warner Bros. Cartoons, camerawoman for the animation process during World War II), dies at age 77.

=== April ===
- April 10: Robert Collard, French writer, illustrator, novelist, painter, art critic, animator, and film director, (founder of his own animation studio, the Lortac workshop), dies at age 88.
- April 23: Hans Fischerkoesen, German commercial animator pioneered the use of three-dimensional elements in animation (Fischerkoesen-Studios, Verwitterte Melodie, (Weather-Beaten Melody), Der Schneeman, (The Snowman), Das dumme Gänslein, (The Silly Goose)), dies at age 76.

=== May ===
- May 3: Jean Bosc, A.K.A. Bosc, French editorial cartoonist and animator, (Voyage en Boscavie), commits suicide at age 48.
- May 26: Ōten Shimokawa, Japanese cartoonist, comics artist and animator (Imokawa Mukuzo Genkanban no Maki), dies at age 81.

=== June ===
- June 17: Luis van Rooten, Mexican-American actor (voice of the King and Grand Duke in Cinderella), dies at age 66.

=== August ===
- August 1: Frederick Worlock, British-American actor (voice of Horace and Inspector Craven in 101 Dalmatians), dies at age 86.
- August 16: Harry Foster Welch, American radio and voice actor (voice of Popeye from 1945 to 1947), dies from heart failure at age 79.

=== September ===
- September 1: Phil DeLara, American animator and comics artist (Warner Bros. Cartoons), dies at age 59.
- September 27: André Rigal, French animation producer and animator (André Rigal's Animation Studio), dies at age 75.

=== October ===
- October 18: Walt Kelly, American animator and cartoonist (Walt Disney Animation Studios), dies at age 60.

=== November ===
- November 20: Allan Sherman, American musician, satirist and television producer (voice of the title character in The Cat in the Hat and Dr. Seuss on the Loose), dies at age 48.
- November 23:
  - Sessue Hayakawa, Japanese actor (voice of the Mole in The Daydreamer), dies at age 87.
  - Robert Ellis, American actor (voice of Cubby in Peter Pan), dies at age 40.

=== December ===
- December 13: Allie Wrubel, American composer and songwriter (Song of the South, Make Mine Music, Melody Time), dies at age 68.
- December 20: George Debels, aka Joe Stan, Belgian-Dutch animator, illustrator and comics artist (De Dierenmars), dies at age 83.

== See also ==
- 1973 in anime
