= 1975 in animation =

Events in 1975 in animation.

== Events ==
=== January ===
- January 5:
  - The first episode of Dog of Flanders is broadcast, an adaptation of Ouida's novel A Dog of Flanders.
- January 11: An animated TV special based on the 2000 Year Old Man sketch is broadcast on CBS, with Mel Brooks and Carl Reiner reprising their characters. The animation is produced by Leo Salkin Films.
- January 28: The Peanuts Valentine's Day TV special Be My Valentine, Charlie Brown. This marks Vince Guaraldi's music upgrade with the then-newly invented ARP String Ensemble used in a Peanuts special, which such instrument was more commonly used in songs during that period.

=== February ===
- February 19: Maurice Sendak's Really Rosie airs. This limited animated TV special went into obscurity decades later.

=== March ===
- March 21: Tomoharu Katsumata and Tim Reid's Hans Christian Andersen's The Little Mermaid premieres.

=== April ===
- April 1:
  - Alexander Schure's Tubby the Tuba is first released.
  - The first episode of the television series Maya the Honey Bee is broadcast.
- April 3: Monty Python and the Holy Grail premieres which has several animated intermezzos and combinations of animation with live-action, directed by Terry Gilliam.
- April 8: 47th Academy Awards: Closed Mondays by Will Vinton and Bob Gardiner wins the Academy Award for Best Animated Short Film.

=== June ===
- June 11: Raúl daSilva's Rime of the Ancient Mariner premieres.

=== July ===
- July 17: Manuel García Ferré's Trapito premieres.

=== August ===
- August 20: Ralph Bakshi's film Coonskin, a combination of animation and live-action, premieres. It flops at the box office due to accusations of racism, but decades later became a cult classic and shed its undeserved bad reputation.
- August 28: Kjell Aukrust's The Pinchcliffe Grand Prix is first released.

=== September ===
- September 4: Belgian cartoonist Picha and Boris Szulzinger release their animated feature film debut Tarzoon: Shame of the Jungle which will become a cult classic.
- September 6:
  - The first episode of The Secret Lives of Waldo Kitty, produced by Filmation, is broadcast.
  - The first episode of Uncle Croc's Block is broadcast, a live-action children's TV show with animated intermezzo's: M*U*S*H, Fraidy Cat and Wacky and Packy.
  - The first episode of The Tom & Jerry Show airs, which is Tom and Jerry's first television show. This show gained negative attention by fans of the theatrical shorts from the golden era due to the result that the duo are shown as friends as slapstick violence were grounded by the Seal of Good Practices at the time. This cartoon ended after one season while regarding these issues.
- September 8: John Hubley's Everybody Rides the Carousel premieres.

=== October ===
- October 1: The first episode of Arabian Nights: Sinbad's Adventures is broadcast.
- October 5: The first episode of Grendizer is broadcast.
- October 6: The first episode of The Adventures of Pepero is broadcast.
- October 10: The first episode of Bod is broadcast.
- October 15: The first episode of Ikkyū-san is broadcast.
- October 23: Yuri Norstein's Hedgehog in the Fog premieres.
- October 28: The Peanuts TV special You're a Good Sport, Charlie Brown premieres on CBS.

=== November ===
- November 9: Sally Cruikshank's Quasi at the Quackadero is first released which will become a cult classic.

=== December ===
- December 19: Bob Clampett releases the anthology film Bugs Bunny: Superstar, directed by Larry Jackson which is the first Looney Tunes package film. The film will attract controversy amongst some of Clampett's colleagues, most obviously Chuck Jones, because Clampett takes credit for many contestable claims.
- December 24:
  - Per Åhlin's Sagan om Karl-Bertil Jonssons julafton is first released in Sweden it will become an annual Christmas tradition.
  - The Smurfs and the Magic Flute, produced by Belvision, premieres.
- December 25: William Feigenbaum and József Gémes' Hugo the Hippo premieres.

=== Specific date unknown ===
- Halas and Batchelor animates the music video for Roger Glover's song Love Is All in which a singing frog with a guitar gathers animals for a ball in the forest.
- Bill Melendez' Dick Deadeye, or Duty Done premieres, based on designs by Ronald Searle.
- André Leduc and Bernard Longpré's Monsieur Pointu premieres.
- The first episode of Leopold the Cat is broadcast.
- Robert Swarthe's Kick Me premieres.
- Bob Godfrey's Great premieres.
- Chuck Jones' adaptation of Rudyard Kipling's Rikki-Tikki-Tavi is released.

== Films released ==
- January 1 - Moby-Dick (Australia)
- January 22 - La Genèse (France)
- March 21 - Hans Christian Andersen's The Little Mermaid (Japan)
- March 27 - Robinson Columbus (Denmark)
- April 1 - Tubby the Tuba (United States)
- June 11 - Rime of the Ancient Mariner (United States)
- July 17 - Trapito (Argentina)
- August 20 - Coonskin (United States)
- August 27 - Donald Duck's Frantic Antic (United States)
- August 28 - Pinchcliffe Grand Prix (Norway)
- August 29 - Walt Disney's Cartoon Carousel (United States)
- September - Dick Deadeye, or Duty Done (United Kingdom)
- September 3 - Bedbug-75, or Mayakovsky's Laughing (Soviet Union)
- September 4 - Tarzoon: Shame of the Jungle (France and Belgium)
- October 24 - The Humpbacked Horse (Soviet Union)
- November 15 - The Mysterious Island (Australia)
- November 27:
  - Ivanhoe (Australia)
  - The Last of the Mohicans (United States and Australia)
- December 14 - Hugo the Hippo (Hungary and United States)
- December 19 - Bugs Bunny: Superstar (United States)
- December 24 - The Smurfs and the Magic Flute (Belgium)
- Specific date unknown:
  - Junma feiteng (China)
  - The Story of the Chinese Gods (Taiwan)

== Television series ==
- January 1 - Kérem a következőt! debuts on Magyar Televízió.
- January 5:
  - Dog of Flanders debuts on Fuji TV.
  - Paddington debuts on BBC1.
- January 7 - Manga Nihon Mukashi Banashi debuts on TBS.
- April 1 - Maya the Honey Bee debuts on NET (now TV Asahi).
- April 4:
  - Brave Raideen debuts on Nihon Educational Television.
  - La Seine no Hoshi debuts on Fuji TV.
- April 5 - Don Chuck Monogatari debuts on Tokyo Channel 12.
- April 7 - Ganba no Bōken debuts on Nippon TV.
- May 15 - Getter Robo G debuts on Fuji TV.
- July 2 - Tekkaman: The Space Knight debuts on NET TV.
- September 6:
  - Fraidy Cat, M*U*S*H, The Great Grape Ape Show, The Oddball Couple, The Tom and Jerry Show, Uncle Croc's Block, and Wacky and Packy debut on ABC.
  - Return to the Planet of the Apes and The Secret Lives of Waldo Kitty debut on NBC.
- September 16 - Peter Puck debuts on NBC.
- October 1 - Arabian Nights: Sinbad's Adventures debuts on Fuji TV.
- October 3 - Wanpaku Omukashi Kum-Kum debuts on TBS.
- October 4 - Time Bokan debuts on Fuji TV.
- October 5:
  - Steel Jeeg debuts on NET (now TV Asahi).
  - Grendizer debuts on Fuji TV.
- October 6:
  - Ganso Tensai Bakabon debuts on Nippon TV.
  - The Adventures of Pepero debuts on NET Network.
- October 7 - Laura, The Prairie Girl debuts on TBS.
- October 15 - Ikkyū-san debuts on NET TV.
- December 23 - Bod debuts on BBC1.
- Specific date unknown:
  - Animal Kwackers debuts on ITV.
  - Leopold the Cat debuts on Russia-1.
  - Noddy debuts on ITV.
  - The Undersea Adventures of Captain Nemo debuts on CBS.

== Births ==
=== January ===
- January 1: Eiichiro Oda, Japanese manga artist (creator of One Piece).
- January 3:
  - Jason Marsden, American voice actor (voice of Kovu in The Lion King II: Simba's Pride and The Lion Guard, Peter Pan in Peter Pan and the Pirates, teenage Clark Kent in Superman: The Animated Series, Richie Foley / Gear and Edwin Alva Jr. in Static Shock, Billy Numerous in Teen Titans, Snapper Carr in Justice League, Danger Duck in Loonatics Unleashed, Haku in Spirited Away, Nermal in the Garfield franchise, Michael in Cartoon All-Stars to the Rescue, Kid Flash and Atom in Young Justice, King Louie and Shere Khan in Jungle Cubs, Firefly in The Batman, Cavin in seasons 4 and 5 of Adventures of the Gummi Bears, continued voice of Max Goof).
  - Danica McKellar, American actress (voice of Miss Martian in Young Justice, Frieda Goren in Static Shock, Frost in DC Super Hero Girls, Judy Jetson in The Jetsons & WWE: Robo-WrestleMania!).
- January 6: Yukana Nogami, Japanese actress and singer (voice of Honoka Yukishiro / Cure White in Futari wa Pretty Cure, Azuki in Azuki-chan, Yuri Tanima in Wedding Peach, Meiling Li in Cardcaptor Sakura, Tessa in Full Metal Panic, Ulrike in Kyo Kara Maoh!, Yumiko Tomi in Fafner in the Azure, C.C. in Code Geass, Cecilia Alcott in Infinite Stratos, Kale in Dragon Ball Super, Kanna in Inuyasha).
- January 17:
  - Coco Lee, Chinese-American singer and songwriter (Mandarin dub voice of Fa Mulan in Mulan), (d. 2023).
  - Freddy Rodriguez, American actor (voice of Mas y Menos in Teen Titans and Teen Titans Go!, Miguel O'Hara / Spider-Man 2099 in Ultimate Spider-Man, Caesar Salazar in Generator Rex).
- January 25: Jorge R. Gutierrez, Mexican animator and voice actor (El Tigre: The Adventures of Manny Rivera, The Book of Life, Maya and the Three).
- January 28: Hiroshi Kamiya, Japanese actor (voice of Levi Ackerman in Attack on Titan, Trafalgar Law in One Piece, Mephisto Pheles in Blue Exorcist, Izaya Orihara in Durarara!!, Shinji Matō in the Fate franchise, Takashi Natsume in Natsume's Book of Friends, Choromatsu in Mr. Osomatsu, Akashi Seijuro in Kuroko's Basketball, Yuzuru Otonashi in Angel Beats!, Yato in Noragami, Nozomu Itoshiki in Sayonara, Zetsubou-Sensei, Koyomi Araragi in Monogatari, Sōma in Working!!, Juli in Brothers Conflict, Balder Hringhorni in Kamigami no Asobi, Tieria Erde in Mobile Suit Gundam 00, Saiki Kusuo in The Disastrous Life of Saiki K., Kinshirō Kusatsu in Cute High Earth Defense Club Love!).
- January 29: Sara Gilbert, American actress, director and producer (voice of Laura Powers in The Simpsons episode "New Kid on the Block", Cindy in the Rugrats episode "Cynthia Comes Alive").
- January 30: Yumi Yoshimura, Japanese singer, musician, actress and member of PUFFY (portrayed herself in the live action segments of Hi Hi Puffy AmiYumi, performed the theme songs of Teen Titans and Hi Hi Puffy AmiYumi).

=== February ===
- February 2: Myriam Sirois, Canadian voice actress (voice of Akane Tendo in Ranma 1/2).
- February 5: Ana Lúcia Menezes, Brazilian actress (dub voice of Amy Rose in Sonic X and Sonic Boom, Margaret in Regular Show, Gwen Tennyson in Ben 10, Misa Amane in Death Note, Koto in Yu Yu Hakusho, Toph Beifong in Avatar: The Last Airbender, the title character in Hilda, Rosalie Rowan in The Zeta Project, Ikon Eron in Gormiti), (d. 2021).
- February 7: Dan Green, American voice actor, voice director, and screenwriter (voice of Yugi Moto in Yu-Gi-Oh! Duel Monsters).
- February 15: Brendon Small, American actor, stand-up comedian, animator, writer, director, producer, and musician (Home Movies, Metalocalypse).
- February 16: Rebecca Shoichet, Canadian voice actress (singing voice of Twilight Sparkle in My Little Pony: Friendship is Magic, voice of Sunset Shimmer in My Little Pony: Equestria Girls).
- February 17: Raymond S. Persi, American animator, storyboard artist (The Twisted Tales of Felix the Cat, Teacher's Pet, Harvey Birdman, Attorney at Law, The Simpsons, Walt Disney Animation Studios), writer and director (The Simpsons, Neighbors from Hell, Extinct, Peanuts specials).
- February 22: Drew Barrymore, American actress, producer (Olive, the Other Reindeer), talk show host and author (voice of the title character in Olive, the Other Reindeer, Akima in Titan A.E., Mrs. Lockhart and Jillian Russell in Family Guy, Maggie Dunlop in Curious George, Sophie Krustofsky and herself in The Simpsons episodes "Insane Clown Poppy" and "The King of Nice").
- February 23:
  - Michael Cornacchia, American actor (voice of Bouncing Boy in Legion of Super Heroes, Frankie in Happy Feet).
  - Robert Lopez, American songwriter (Frozen, Coco, Winnie the Pooh, Wonder Pets!, the South Park episode "Broadway Bro Down", the Central Park episode "Castle Sweet Castle").
- February 26: Matthew Faughnan, American animator and director (The Simpsons).
- February 27: Ego Plum, American film composer, musician, and performer (SpongeBob SquarePants, Jellystone!, Making Fiends, Harvey Beaks).
- Specific date unknown: Hugh Welchman, British filmmaker, screenwriter, and producer (Peter and the Wolf, Loving Vincent).

=== March ===
- March 7: Sarayu Rao, American actress (voice of Margie in Inside Out 2, Diya Dinkley in Velma).
- March 8: Christy Karacas, American animator, writer, producer, director, voice actor and musician (Adult Swim).
- March 15: will.i.am, American musician and member of the Black Eyed Peas (voice of Moto Moto in Madagascar: Escape 2 Africa, Snow in Arthur and the Revenge of Maltazard, Pedro in Rio and Rio 2, Bernard Bernard in The Cleveland Show, himself in The Cleveland Show episode "Menace II Secret Society", performed the theme song of Samurai Jack).
- March 16:
  - Maggie Blue O'Hara, Canadian actress (voice of Bulma in the Ocean Productions dub of Dragon Ball Z, Ultra Violet in Ninjago, Kitty Pryde in X-Men: Evolution, Strawberry Sunrise in the My Little Pony: Friendship Is Magic episode "Honest Apple").
  - Eban Schletter, American composer and songwriter (SpongeBob SquarePants, Father of the Pride, Drawn Together, The Patrick Star Show).
- March 22: Nathan Greno, American film director, story artist, and writer (Walt Disney Animation Studios, Skydance Animation).
- March 27: Fergie (Stacy Ferguson), American actress and former lead vocalist of the Black Eyed Peas (voice of Replay in Arthur and the Revenge of Maltazard, Sally Brown in It's Flashbeagle, Charlie Brown, Snoopy's Getting Married, Charlie Brown, and The Charlie Brown and Snoopy Show).
- March 30: Valentina Garza, Cuban-American television writer and producer (The Simpsons, Bordertown).
- Specific date unknown: Nigel Pilkington, English actor (voice of Gill in Dragons: Rescue Riders, Drac in Super Monsters, Percy in Thomas & Friends, Squirrel Nutkin in Peter Rabbit, Tabaqui and Rikki-Tikki-Tavi in The Jungle Book).

=== April ===
- April 2:
  - Deedee Magno Hall, American actress and singer (voice of Pearl in the Steven Universe franchise, Snuggs in Doc McStuffins, Miss Deer in Kiff).
  - Pedro Pascal, Chilean and American actor (voice of Fink the Fox in The Wild Robot).
- April 4: Pamela Ribon, American screenwriter (Moana, Smurfs: The Lost Village, Ralph Breaks the Internet, My Year of Dicks, Nimona), author, television writer, blogger and actress (voice of Snow White in Ralph Breaks the Internet, Kaori in City Hunter).
- April 6: Zach Braff, American actor and filmmaker (voice of the title character in Chicken Little, Paul Revere and X-Stream Mike in Clone High, himself in the BoJack Horseman episodes "Underground" and "The View from Halfway Down").
- April 7: Tiki Barber, American former football running back (voice of Touchdown Tiki in the Wow! Wow! Wubbzy! episode "What a Card").
- April 10: David Harbour, American actor (voice of Rick Buck in Q-Force, Frankenstein in Creature Commandos, Tajin in the Star Wars: Visions episode "The Elder", Fred Kranepool in The Simpsons episode "Undercover Burns", Red Guardian in What If...?, and Marvel Zombies).
- April 13: Angus MacLane, American film director, animator, screenwriter and voice actor (Pixar).
- April 14: Amy Birnbaum, American voice actress (voice of Tea Gardner in Yu-Gi-Oh!).
- April 15: Elissa Knight, American voice actress and assistant (voice of Tia in Cars, EVE in WALL-E).
- April 22: Dannah Phirman, Israeli-born American actress (voice of Zaria in Tak and the Power of Juju, the title character, Claire McCallister, Chuck the Evil Sandwich Making Guy's Mother, Edith Von Hoosinghaus and Pretty Princess in WordGirl, Penny in The Mighty B!, The Moon and Ben's Mom in Talking Tom and Friends, Missy in The Fairly OddParents episode "Finding Emo"), comedian and writer (The Mighty B!, WordGirl, The Mr. Peabody & Sherman Show).
- April 27: Erica Schroeder, American voice actress (voice of Monkey D. Luffy in the 4Kids dub of One Piece, Mana Dark Magician Girl and Mai Valentine in Yu-Gi-Oh!, various characters in the Pokémon franchise, Lyserg Diethel in Shaman King).
- April 30: Johnny Galecki, American actor (voice of Knux in the Batman Beyond episode "April Moon", Leonard Hofstadter in the Family Guy episode "Business Guy").

=== May ===
- May 3:
  - Christina Hendricks, American actress (voice of Gabby Gabby in Toy Story 4, Zarina in The Pirate Fairy, Cherie in Solar Opposites, Lois Lane in All-Star Superman, Officer Jaffe in Scoob!, Naydern in the American Dad! episode "Gorillas in the Mist", Unity in the Rick and Morty episode "Auto Erotic Assimilation").
  - Jeffrey Garcia, American actor and stand-up comedian (voice of Sheen Estevez in the Jimmy Neutron franchise, Pip in the Barnyard franchise, Rinaldo in Happy Feet and Happy Feet Two, Tipa and Bat in Rio, Spoonbill and Perl in Rio 2, Jerry Rivera in the ChalkZone episode "Indecent Exposure", Jesus Christo in the Clone High episode "A.D.D.: The Last 'D' is for Disorder", Ricardo Amino in the Ozzy & Drix episode "Tricky Ricardo", Tookie Thomas in The Proud Family episode "Who you Callin' a Sissy?"), (d. 2025).
- May 8: Kaspar Jancis, Estonian film director and musician (Frank ja Wendy, Captain Morten and the Spider Queen).
- May 9: Chris Diamantopoulos, Canadian actor (voice of Mickey Mouse in Mickey Mouse and The Wonderful World of Mickey Mouse, Darkwing Duck and Storkules in DuckTales, Green Arrow in Batman Unlimited and Justice League Action).
- May 10: Julie Nathanson, American actress (voice of Rosalie Rowan in the DC Animated Universe, Black Widow in Avengers Assemble, Gilda Dent in Batman: The Long Halloween, Silver Banshee in Suicide Squad: Hell to Pay, Robin in The Powerpuff Girls episode "Superfriends", Ally in the Megas XLR episode "Terminate Her", continued voice of Belle).
- May 15: Ben Whitehead, English actor (voice of Baker Bob in A Matter of Loaf and Death, The Pirate Who Likes Sunsets and Kittens in the UK dub of The Pirates! In an Adventure with Scientists!, continued voice of Wallace in the Wallace and Gromit franchise, additional voices in Early Man).
- May 17: Rufus Jones, English actor (voice of Hugo in 101 Dalmatian Street, the Flying Scotsman in Thomas & Friends).
- May 20: Marc Thompson, American voice actor (voice of Kevin Thompson, Anthony DeMartino, Timothy O'Neill, and Jamie White in Daria, Shark, Bee, Robot and Turtle in WordWorld, Casey Jones in Teenage Mutant Ninja Turtles, Knut in Winx Club, Dante Vale in Huntik: Secrets & Seekers, the title character in P. King Duckling, Megatron in Transformers: Cyberverse, English dub voice of multiple characters in Pokémon, including Maxie, Dr. Zager, Remo, Farfetch'd and Sirfetch'd, Tepig and its evolutions, Sandile and its evolutions and Noibat and Noivern).
- May 24: Will Sasso, Canadian actor (voice of Mr. Ellingboe in Klaus, Maxie Zeus in Harley Quinn, Hekakiah in the Glenn Martin, DDS episode "Amish Anguish").
- May 27: André 3000, American musician and actor (voice of Senator Harvey in the Brad Neely's Harg Nallin' Sclopio Peepio episode "For Aretha", co-creator and voice of Sunny Bridges in Class of 3000).
- May 29: Daniel Tosh, American actor and comedian (voice of Malloy in Brickleberry).
- May 30:
  - Loni Steele Sosthand, American television writer (The Simpsons).
  - CeeLo Green, American singer, songwriter, rapper, record producer, and actor (voice of Murray in Hotel Transylvania, The Hot Tub in the American Dad episode "Hot Water", Shuggie in The Proud Family: Louder and Prouder, Reverend Rollo Goodlove in The Boondocks, himself in Teen Titans Go!).

=== June ===
- June 1: Bryan Konietzko, American animator, writer, producer and director (Avatar: The Last Airbender).
- June 4:
  - Angelina Jolie, American actress (voice of Master Tigress in the Kung Fu Panda franchise, Lola in Shark Tale).
  - Russell Brand, English comedian and actor (voice of Dr. Nefario in the Despicable Me franchise, Creek in Trolls, himself in The Simpsons episode "Angry Dad: The Movie").
- June 9: Tommy Karlsen Sandum, Norwegian actor (Norwegian dub voice of Shrek and Pinocchio in the Shrek franchise, Wildmutt in the Ben 10 franchise, Eddy in Ed, Edd n Eddy, Armando in Rio, General Gato and General Mono in TMNT), (d. 2024).
- June 13: Daniel Ingram, Canadian composer and lyricist (DHX Media, Kung-Fu Magoo, Nina's World, We're Lalaloopsy, Esme & Roy).
- June 25: Linda Cardellini, American actress (voice of Wendy Corduroy in Gravity Falls, Marcy 'Hot Dog Water' Fleach in Scooby-Doo: Mystery Incorporated, CJ in Regular Show).
- June 27: Tobey Maguire, American actor and film producer (voice of Adult Tim Templeton / Narrator in The Boss Baby).
- June 28: Jeff Geddis, Canadian actor (voice of Reef in Stoked, Devin and Tom in Total Drama Presents: The Ridonculous Race).

=== July ===
- July 6: Alessandro Juliani, Canadian actor (voice of L in Death Note, Kid Icarus in Captain N: The Game Master, Gambit in X-Men: Evolution, Lobo in Super Monsters).
- July 10: Stefán Karl Stefánsson, Icelandic actor and singer (portrayed Robbie Rotten in LazyTown), (d. 2018).
- July 12: Phil Lord, American producer (The Lego Batman Movie, The Lego Ninjago Movie, Spider-Man: Into the Spider-Verse, Bless the Harts, The Mitchells vs. the Machines, co-creator of Clone High), director (Cloudy with a Chance of Meatballs, The Lego Movie), writer (Cloudy with a Chance of Meatballs 2, The Lego Movie 2: The Second Part) and voice actor.
- July 14: Jaime Gomez, American rapper and member of Black Eyed Peas (Blue's Big City Adventure, voice of Waqaq in Spirit Rangers, and Quickatoo in Dora the Explorer).
- July 19: Reuben Langdon, American stuntman and voice actor (voice of Dante in Devil May Cry: The Animated Series, Ken Masters in Street Fighter IV: The Ties That Bind, and Wreck-It Ralph).
- July 20:
  - Jason Raize, American actor and singer (voice of Denahi in Brother Bear), (d. 2004).
  - Judy Greer, American actress (voice of Cheryl Tunt in Archer, Beep in Ask the StoryBots, Luna in Let's Go Luna!, Wendy Park in Glenn Martin, DDS, Yuki in The Cat Returns, Martha Washington in America: The Motion Picture).
- July 22: David Dastmalchian, American actor (voice of Calendar Man and Penguin in Batman: The Long Halloween, Kurt in the What If...? episode "What If... Zombies?!").

=== August ===
- August 5: Ami Foster, American actress and singer (voice of Margaux Kramer in It's Punky Brewster, Holly in Pound Puppies, Kristi in The Little Troll Prince, Sally Brown in Snoopy! The Musical, Lucy Van Pelt in the This Is America, Charlie Brown episode "The Birth of the Constitution").
- August 6: Trista H. Navarro, American animation production manager (The Simpsons, The Simpsons Movie), (d. 2019).
- August 7:
  - Christy Hui, Chinese producer (creator of Xiaolin Showdown and Xiaolin Chronicles).
  - Charlize Theron, South African-American actress (voice of Monkey in Kubo and the Two Strings, Morticia Addams in The Addams Family and The Addams Family 2).
- August 11: Roger Craig Smith, American actor (voice of Sonic in the Sonic the Hedgehog franchise, Captain America in Ultimate Spider-Man, Avengers Assemble, Hulk and the Agents of S.M.A.S.H., Guardians of the Galaxy, Spider-Man, Marvel Disk Wars: The Avengers, and Marvel Future Avengers, Warden Wrath and Jacob Hopkins in The Owl House, Hawkodile and Richard in Unikitty!, Steam Smythe, the Forever Knight, and Diamondhead in Ben 10, Ocean Master in Young Justice, Captain Marvel in The Avengers: Earth's Mightiest Heroes, Mister Miracle in the Justice League Action episode "It'll Take A Miracle!").
- August 12: Zeke Johnson, American animator, storyboard artist (Family Guy, American Dad!), background artist (Futurama, Baby Blues, What a Cartoon!) and prop designer (Futurama, Baby Blues, American Dad!).
- August 16: Taika Waititi, New Zealand filmmaker, actor and comedian (voice of Mo Morrison in Lightyear, the title character in Save Ralph, Glootie in the Rick and Morty episode "The Old Man and the Seat", Korg in the What If...? episode "What If... Thor Were an Only Child?").
- August 18: Kaitlin Olson, American actress (voice of Destiny in Finding Dory, Ethel Anderson in season 1 of Brickleberry, Quinn Hopper in The Simpsons episode "The Girl Code", Brenda Quagmire in the Family Guy episode "Screams of Silence: The Story of Brenda Q").
- August 29: Dante Basco, American voice actor (voice of Zuko in Avatar: The Last Airbender, the title character in American Dragon: Jake Long, Javier in Victor and Valentino, Scorpion in Ultimate Spider-Man, Tuck in Generator Rex, Matt Martin / Kewl Breeze in Zevo-3, Karate Kid in JLA Adventures: Trapped in Time).
- August 31: Sara Ramirez, Mexican-American actor and singer (voice of Queen Miranda in Sofia the First).

=== September ===
- September 1: John Aoshima, American animator (Baby Blues, Futurama, What a Cartoon!, Looney Tunes, The Simpsons, Avatar: The Last Airbender), storyboard artist (Family Guy, Disney Television Animation, Kung Fu Panda: Legends of Awesomeness, American Dad!, Kubo and the Two Strings, Maya and the Three), sheet timer (Star vs. the Forces of Evil), writer (The LeBrons) and director (American Dad!, Disney Television Animation).
- September 2:
  - Brad Ableson, American animator (The Simpsons, The Life & Times of Tim), storyboard artist (The Simpsons, The Simpsons Movie), director (Minions: The Rise of Gru) and producer (co-creator of Good Vibes and Legends of Chamberlain Heights).
  - MC Chris, American rapper, voice actor, comedian and writer (voice of MC Pee Pants in Aqua Teen Hunger Force, Hesh Hepplewhite in Sealab 2021).
- September 10: Gabe Swarr, American animator (Spümcø, What a Cartoon!, El Tigre: The Adventures of Manny Rivera), storyboard artist (The Ripping Friends, Dexter's Laboratory, Nickelodeon Animation Studio, ¡Mucha Lucha!, The Buzz on Maggie, Coconut Fred's Fruit Salad Island, Brandy & Mr. Whiskers), character designer (Poochini), background artist (Boo Boo Runs Wild), writer (Dexter's Laboratory, My Life as a Teenage Robot, Shorty McShorts' Shorts), producer (Animaniacs) and director (Spümcø, Shorty McShorts' Shorts, Nickelodeon Animation Studio).
- September 16: Toks Olagundoye, Nigerian actress (voice of Nanefua Pizza in Steven Universe, Bentina Beakley in DuckTales, Cleo in Carmen Sandiego, Mel Medarda in Arcane, Krang Two in Rise of the Teenage Mutant Ninja Turtles: The Movie, Zamfir in Castlevania).
- September 18: Jason Sudeikis, American actor and comedian (voice of Red in The Angry Birds Movie and The Angry Birds Movie 2, Justin Pin and Ares in Next Gen, Holt Ritcher and Terry Kimple in The Cleveland Show, Bryce Fowler in Hit-Monkey, Professor Bomba in Epic).
- September 19: Jim Hecht, American screenwriter (The Fairly OddParents, Ice Age).
- September 23: Christopher Miller, American film director (Cloudy with a Chance of Meatballs, The Lego Movie), writer (Cloudy with a Chance of Meatballs 2, The Lego Movie 2: The Second Part, co-creator of Clone High), producer (The Lego Batman Movie, The Lego Ninjago Movie, Spider-Man: Into the Spider-Verse, Bless the Harts, The Mitchells vs. the Machines) and voice actor.

=== October ===
- October 3: Alanna Ubach, American actress (voice of Rope Girl, and Skate Lad in Teamo Supremo, the title character in El Tigre: The Adventures of Manny Rivera, Lola Boa in Brandy & Mr. Whiskers, Ansi Molina in Welcome to the Wayne, Rook Shar and Rook Ben in Ben 10: Omniverse, Liz Allan in The Spectacular Spider-Man, Mamá Imelda in Coco).
- October 5:
  - Scott Weinger, American actor (voice of Aladdin in the Aladdin franchise and House of Mouse).
  - Monica Rial, American actress (voice of Kyoko Tokiwa in Full Metal Panic!, Minamo Kurosawa in Azumanga Daioh, Sayuki in Initial D, Bulma in the Dragon Ball franchise, Tsubaki Nakatsukasa in Soul Eater, Shizuka Marikawa in Highschool of the Dead, Mirajane Strauss in Fairy Tail, Kaede Kayano in Assassination Classroom, Tsuyu Asui / Froppy in My Hero Academia).
  - Kate Winslet, English actress (voice of Rita Malone in Flushed Away, Madame Mumblechook in Mary and the Witch's Flower).
  - Parminder Nagra, English actress (voice of Cassandra in Batman: Gotham Knight, Nisha Bains in Postman Pat: The Movie, Ada in the Tron: Uprising episode "Isolated").
- October 16: Kellie Martin, American actress (voice of Daphne Blake in A Pup Named Scooby-Doo, Molly Tazmanian Devil in Taz-Mania, Sadira in Aladdin, Roxanne in A Goofy Movie, Oracle in The Batman episode "Artifacts").
- October 19: James L. Venable, American composer (Cartoon Network Studios).
- October 20:
  - Natalie Gregory, American former child actress (voice of Jenny in Oliver & Company).
  - Brian Iles, American animator (The Simpsons, The Oblongs), storyboard artist (Drawn Together, American Dad!, Family Guy) and director (Family Guy).
- Specific date unknown: Amy Winfrey, American animator, screenwriter, songwriter, director and voice actress (Making Fiends, South Park, Bojack Horseman).

=== November ===
- November 2: Danny Cooksey, American actor (voice of Montana Max in Tiny Toon Adventures, Urchin in The Little Mermaid, Wendall Malone in The Completely Mental Misadventures of Ed Grimley, the title character in Dave the Barbarian, Francis Stone / Hotstreak in Static Shock, Jack Spicer in Xiaolin Showdown, Brad Buttowski in Kick Buttowski: Suburban Daredevil, Paul Cheechoo in The Secret Saturdays, Peter Lik in What's with Andy?, Greg Skeens in Recess, Milo Kamalani in Pepper Ann, Mooch in 101 Dalmatians: The Series, Peng in Kung Fu Panda: Legends of Awesomeness).
- November 6: Mike Hollingsworth, American artist, animator, and stand-up comedian (BoJack Horseman, Brickleberry, The Life and Times of Tim, Cat Burglar).
- November 21: Jimmi Simpson, American actor (voice of Green Arrow in Green Lantern: Beware My Power, Drednok in Star Trek: Prodigy, Royce Hemlock in Star Wars: The Bad Batch, Ethan in the Solar Opposites episode "The Apple Pencil Pro").
- November 26: DJ Khaled, American DJ, record executive, author and record producer (voice of Ears in Spies in Disguise).

=== December ===
- December 1: David Hornsby, American actor, screenwriter and producer (voice of Brandon in The X's, Fanboy in Fanboy & Chum Chum, Tyson, Vivian, Radley and Edwardo in Sanjay and Craig, Wildvine in Ben 10, Leif Bornewell III in Welcome to the Wayne, Riddler in DC Super Hero Girls, Harry in the We Bare Bears episode "Christmas Movies", co-creator of and voice of Joel Zymanski in Unsupervised).
- December 6: Sayaka Ohara, Japanese voice actress (voice of Layla Hamilton in Kaleido Star, Yūko Ichihara in xxxHolic, Beatrice in Umineko When They Cry, Milly Ashford in Code Geass, Erza Scarlet in Fairy Tail, Irisviel in Fate/Zero).
- December 10: Emmanuelle Chriqui, Canadian-American actress (voice of Cheetara in ThunderCats, Paige in Tron: Uprising, Sapphire Stagg in Beware the Batman).
- December 12:
  - Houko Kuwashima, Japanese actress (voice of Itsuki Myoudouin / Cure Sunshine in HeartCatch PreCure!, Sango in Inuyasha, Kenny Kyouju in Beyblade, Kagura in Azumanga Daioh, Hitomi in GeGeGe no Kitaro, Nene Amano in Digimon Fusion).
  - Mayim Bialik, American actress, television personality, and author (voice of Brittany Bright in The Adventures of Hyperman, Maria in Hey Arnold!, Kirsten Kurst in Recess, Mean Cindy in Lloyd in Space, Justice Flanner in the Kim Possible episode "Partners", Great Sphinx in the Blaze and the Monster Machines episode "Race to the Top of the World", Willoughby in the Star vs. the Forces of Evil episode "Fetch").
- December 18: Sia, Australian singer and songwriter (voice of Songbird Serenade in My Little Pony: The Movie, Mrs. Tiggy-Winkle in Peter Rabbit and Peter Rabbit 2: The Runaway, Half-Oracle in Charming, Autotuned Randy in the South Park episode "The Cissy", herself in the Scooby-Doo and Guess Who? episode "Now You Sia, Now You Don't!").

=== Specific date unknown ===
- Dan Santat, American author and illustrator (creator of The Replacements).
- Bryan Andrews, American animator, storyboard artist and writer (Cartoon Network Studios).

== Deaths ==
=== January ===
- January 22: Hazel Sewell, American animator, head of the ink and paint department at Walt Disney Animation Studios (Plane Crazy, Snow White and the Seven Dwarfs), dies at age 76.
- January 27: Bill Walsh, American film producer, screenwriter and comics writer (Mary Poppins, Bedknobs and Broomsticks), dies at age 61.

=== February ===
- February 23: Frank Smith, American animator and film director (Fleischer Studios, UPA, Peanuts animated specials), dies at age 63.

=== March ===
- March 2: Salvador Mestres, Spanish animator, film director and comics artist (Hispano Grafic Films), dies at age 64 or 65.

=== May ===
- May 8: Abe Levitow, American animator (Warner Bros. Cartoons, MGM animation, UPA) and director (Mr. Magoo's Christmas Carol, The Phantom Tollbooth), dies at age 52.

=== June ===
- June 19: Ge Ge Pearson, American actress (second voice of Crusader Rabbit in Crusader Rabbit), dies at age 58.

=== July ===
- July 19: Manny Gould, American animator (Barré Studio, Paramount Studios, Columbia Pictures, Warner Bros. Cartoons, Ed Graham Productions, DePatie-Freleng Enterprises, Ralph Bakshi), dies at age 71.

=== August ===
- August 14 Frank Marsales, Canadian composer (Warner Bros. Cartoons, Walter Lantz Studios), dies at age 88.

=== September ===
- September 4: Walter Tetley, American actor (voice of Felix the Cat, Andy Panda, Sherman in The Adventures of Rocky and Bullwinkle and Friends), dies at age 60.

=== October ===
- October 16: Don Barclay, American actor and caricaturist (voice of the Doorman in Cinderella), dies at age 82.
- October 29: John Scott Trotter, American arranger, composer and orchestra leader (Peanuts), dies at age 67.

=== November ===
- November 28: Valentina Semyonovna Brumberg, Russian animator, film director and screenwriter (The Tale of Tsar Saltan, The Lost Letter, The Night Before Christmas, It Was I Who Drew the Little Man), dies at age 76.

=== December ===
- December 7: Hardie Albright, American actor (voice of adolescent Bambi in Bambi), dies at age 71.
- December 18: Ray Bailey, American animator and comics artist (Fleischer Brothers), dies at age 62.
- December 24:
  - Harold Mack, British animator and comics artist (worked for Gaumont British Animation, British Animated Pictures and Marten Toonder's animation studio, founder of the Anglo-Dutch Group), dies at age 67.
- December 26: Igor Podgorskiy, Russian animator, dies at age 53.

== See also ==
- 1975 in anime
