= List of animated television series of 1973 =

A list of animated television series that first aired in 1973.

Animated television series first aired in 1973
Title	Episodes	Country	Year	Notes	Technique
The Addams Family (1973)	16	United States	1973	Spin-off of The Addams Family and The New Scooby-Doo Movies	Traditional
Aim for the Ace!	26	Japan	1973–74		Anime
Babel II	39	Japan	1973		Anime
Bailey's Comets	32	United States	1973–74		Traditional
Bōken Korobokkuru	26	Japan	1973–74		Anime
Butch Cassidy and the Sundance Kids	13	United States	1973		Traditional
Casshan	35	Japan	1973–74		Anime
Cutie Honey	25	Japan	1973–74		Anime
Demetan Croaker, The Boy Frog	39	Japan	1973		Anime
Doraemon	26	Japan	1973		Anime
Dororon Enma-kun	25	Japan	1973–74		Anime
Emergency +4	23	United States	1973–74	Spin-off of Emergency!	Traditional
Fables of the Green Forest	52	Japan	1973		Anime
Goober and the Ghost Chasers	16	United States	1973		Traditional
Inch High, Private Eye	13	United States	1973		Traditional
Jeannie	16	United States	1973		Traditional
Jungle Kurobe	31	Japan	1973		Anime
Karate Master	47	Japan	1973–74		Anime
The Kingdom of Could Be You	13	United States	1973		Traditional
Kōya no Shōnen Isamu	52	Japan	1973–74		Anime
Little Wansa	26	Japan	1973		Anime
Microsuperman	26	Japan	1973		Anime
Miracle Girl Limit-chan	25	Japan	1973–74		Anime
Mission: Magic!	16	United States	1973	Spin-off of The Brady Kids	Traditional
My Favorite Martians	16	United States	1973	Spin-off of My Favorite Martian	Traditional
Samurai Giants	46	Japan	1973–74		Anime
Schoolhouse Rock!	64	United States	1973–2009		Traditional
Speed Buggy	16	United States	1973		Traditional
Star Trek: The Animated Series	22	United States	1973–74	Spin-off of Star Trek	Traditional
Super Friends	16	United States	1973		Traditional
The Wombles	60	United Kingdom	1973–75		Stop-Motion
Yogi's Gang	17	United States	1973	Spin-off of The ABC Saturday Superstar Movie	Traditional
Zero Tester	66	Japan	1973–74		Anime

== See also ==
- List of animated feature films of 1973
- List of Japanese animation television series of 1973
