= List of animated feature films of 1973 =

This is a list of animated feature films first released in 1973.

== List ==
Title	Country	Director	Production company	Animation technique	Format	Notes	Release date	Duration
20,000 Leagues Under the Sea	United States	Jules Bass; Arthur Rankin Jr.	Rankin/Bass	Traditional	Television special	Originally aired from October 1 to October 8, 1972, as a two-part installment of the syndicated animated anthology series Festival of Family Classics (1972–1973).	1973	40 minutes
Adventures of Mowgli; Маугли (Maugli)	Soviet Union	Roman Davydov	Soyuzmultfilm	Traditional	Theatrical		July 31, 1973	96 minutes
The Adventures of Barbapapa; Le avventure di Barbapapà	Italy	Annette Tison; Talus Taylor	Polyscope B. V. Frank Fehmers Productions B. V. Reflex Cinematographica; Distribuzione Heritage Italiana	Traditional	Theatrical			70 minutes
The Adventures of Hijitus; Las aventuras de Hijitus	Argentina	Manuel García Ferré	Producciones García Ferré	Traditional	Theatrical		September 12, 1973	82 minutes
Belladonna of Sadness 哀しみのベラドンナ (Kanashimi no Beradonna); La Sorcière (The Witch)	Japan; France	Eiichi Yamamoto	Mushi Production; Nippon Herald Films	Traditional	Theatrical		June 30, 1973	86 minutes
The Black Arrow	Australia	Leif Gram	Air Programs International	Traditional	Television special	Originally aired as the 14th installment of the CBS animated anthology series Famous Classic Tales (1970–1984).	December 2, 1973	
Charlotte's Web	United States	Charles A. Nichols; Iwao Takamoto	Paramount Pictures; Hanna-Barbera; Sagittarius Productions	Traditional	Theatrical		March 1, 1973	94 minutes
The Count of Monte Cristo	United States; Australia	William Hanna; Joseph Barbera	Hanna-Barbera Australia	Traditional	Television special	Originally aired as the 9th installment of the CBS animated anthology series Famous Classic Tales (1970–1984).	September 23, 1973	60 minutes
Fantastic Planet; La Planète sauvage Divoká planeta (The Wild Planet)	Czechoslovakia; France	René Laloux	Jiří Trnka Studio	Traditional	Theatrical		May 11, 1973	71 minutes
Heavy Traffic	United States	Ralph Bakshi	Krantz Films; Cine Camera; American International Pictures	Traditional	Theatrical		August 8, 1973	76 minutes
The Incredible, Indelible, Magical, Physical, Mystery Trip	United States	Jim Gates	DePatie-Freleng Enterprises	Traditional/Live action	Television special	Originally aired as the 5th installment of the ABC anthology television series ABC Afterschool Special (1972–1997).	February 7, 1973	45 minutes
Johnny Corncob; János vitéz (John the Valiant)	Hungary	Marcell Jankovics	Pannónia Filmstúdió	Traditional	Theatrical	First Hungarian animated feature.	May 1, 1973	74 minutes
Johnny in the Valley of the Giants; Joë petit boum-boum (Joe the Little Boom Boom)	France	Jean Image	Films Jean Image	Traditional	Theatrical		April 19, 1973	60 minutes
Kidnapped	Australia	Leif Gram	Air Programs International	Traditional	Television special	Originally aired as the 10th installment of the CBS animated anthology series Famous Classic Tales (1970–1984).	October 22, 1973	47 minutes
King Dick; Il nano e la strega (The Dwarf and the Witch)	Italy	Gioacchino Libratti	Alpha D. C. Monti Film; S. O. N. – Parigi	Traditional	Theatrical			67 minutes
Little 8th Route Army 小八路	China	Lei You	Shanghai Animation Film Studio	Stop motion	Theatrical			
Lost in Space	United States	Charles A. Nichols	Hanna-Barbera; 20th Century-Fox Television	Traditional	Television film		September 8, 1973	60 minutes
Luvcast U.S.A.	United States	Robert Balser	DePatie–Freleng Enterprises	Traditional	Television film Anthology film		January 6, 1973	60 minutes
Magic Adventure; Mágica aventura	Spain	Cruz Delgado	Estudios Cruz Delgado	Traditional	Theatrical		June 9, 1973	69 minutes
Man: The Polluter	Canada; Yugoslavia	Don Arioli; Hugh Foulds; Chuck Jones; Wolf Koenig; Kaj Pindal; Frank Nissen; Pino Van Lamsweerde; Milan Blazekovic; Zlatko Bourek; Nedeljko Dragic; Boris Kolar; Aleksandar Marks; Vladimir Jutrisa; Dusan Vukotic; Ante Zaninovic	National Film Board of Canada; Zagreb Film	Traditional	Television film		August 8, 1973	53 minutes
Marco	United States; Japan	Jules Bass; Arthur Rankin Jr.	Rankin/Bass; Toho Company; Video Tokyo Production (Animagic)	Stop motion/Live action	Theatrical		December 1973	109 minutes
Mazinger Z vs. Devilman マジンガーＺ対デビルマン (Majingā Zetto tai Debiruman)	Japan	Tomoharu Katsumata	Toei Animation	Traditional	Theatrical		July 18, 1973	43 minutes
The Mini-Munsters	United States	Gerard Baldwin	Fred Calvert Productions; Universal Television	Traditional	Television film		October 27, 1973	60 minutes
Nanny and the Professor and the Phantom of the Circus	United States		Fred Calvert Productions; 20th Century-Fox Television	Traditional	Television film	Sequel to Nanny and the Professor (1972).	November 17, 1973	60 minutes
Once Upon a Time; Maria d'Oro und Bello Blue (Maria d'Oro and Bello Blue)	Italy; West Germany	Roberto Gavioli; Rolf Kauka	Kauka-Film; Gamma Film	Traditional	Theatrical		December 12, 1973	78 minutes
The Panda's Great Adventure パンダの大冒険 (Panda no Daibōken)	Japan	Yugo Serikawa	Toei Animation	Traditional	Theatrical		March 17, 1973	53 minutes
Piconzé	Brazil	Ypê Nakashima	Telstar Filmes	Traditional	Theatrical	First Brazilian animated feature film filmed in color.	January 24, 1973	80 minutes
Robin Hood	United States	Wolfgang Reitherman	Walt Disney Productions	Traditional	Theatrical		November 8, 1973	83 minutes
The Swiss Family Robinson	Australia	Leif Gram	Air Programs International	Traditional	Television special	Originally aired as the 11th installment of the CBS animated anthology series Famous Classic Tales (1970–1984).	October 28, 1973	47 minutes
That Girl in Wonderland	United States	Jules Bass; Arthur Rankin Jr.	Rankin/Bass	Traditional	Television film		January 13, 1973	60 minutes
The Three Musketeers	United States; Australia	William Hanna; Joseph Barbera	Hanna-Barbera Australia	Traditional	Television special	Originally aired as the 13th installment of the CBS animated anthology series Famous Classic Tales (1970–1984).	November 23, 1973	50 Minutes
Treasure Island	United States	Hal Sutherland	Filmation; Warner Bros. Pictures	Traditional	Theatrical	First film of the aborted Filmation anthology film series Family Classics, which yielded from a distribution deal with Warner Bros. by the animation studio.	December 9, 1973	87 minutes
Twenty Thousand Leagues Under the Sea	United States; Australia	William Hanna; Joseph Barbera	Hanna-Barbera Australia	Traditional	Television special	Originally aired as the 12th installment of the CBS animated anthology series Famous Classic Tales (1970–1984).	November 22, 1973	60 minutes
Walt Disney's 50th Anniversary Show	United States	Norman Tokar; David Hand; Jack Hannah; Jack King; Jack Kinney; Dick Lundy; Charles A. Nichols; Ben Sharpsteen	Walt Disney Productions	Traditional	Theatrical; Anthology film	Film compiled from Disney theatrical animated shorts; originally released theatrically for overseas markets and never in the United States.	July 12, 1973	87 minutes

== See also ==
- List of animated television series of 1973
