= The Saga of Carl =

- The Simpsons episode
- Promotional poster
- Episode no.: Season 24; Episode 21
- Directed by: Chuck Sheetz
- Written by: Eric Kaplan
- Production code: RABF14
- Original air date: May 19, 2013

Guest appearance
- Sigur Rós as themselves

Episode features
- Couch gag: The Simpsons are sea creatures sitting on a shell couch. All of them get eaten by Blinky, the three-eyed fish.

Episode chronology
| ← Previous "The Fabulous Faker Boy" | Next → "Dangers on a Train" |
- The Simpsons season 24

"The Saga of Carl" is the twenty-first and penultimate episode of the twenty-fourth season of the American animated television series The Simpsons, and the 529th episode overall. The episode was directed by Chuck Sheetz and written by Eric Kaplan. It originally aired on the Fox network in the United States on May 19, 2013, in conjunction with the season finale, "Dangers on a Train."

In this episode, Homer and his friends follow Carl to Iceland after he disappears with their lottery winnings. The Icelandic band Sigur Rós guest starred and scored original music for the episode, along with their own interpretation of the Simpsons opening theme. The episode received mixed reviews.

== Plot ==
Bart and Lisa become addicted to Ki-Ya Karate Monsters, an animated show featuring monsters who are karate warriors. Marge becomes annoyed at their play-fighting and insists they go to a museum, but the main attraction is The Science of Ki-Ya Karate Monsters. At another exhibit on probability, Homer becomes fascinated by a video featuring Blaise Pascal that discusses the odds of winning the lottery. Later, Homer, Lenny, Carl and Moe's weekly lottery ticket wins them $200,000, which they agree to share four ways. Carl goes to cash in the ticket while the others prepare for a celebration. When he does not appear, the others realize that he has fled with the money.

After some genealogy research, Homer discovers that Carl fled to his adoptive ancestors' home of Iceland. (Note: As mentioned in the fourteenth season episode "'Scuse Me While I Miss the Sky") Homer, Lenny, and Moe fly to Reykjavík to claim their share of the money. They meet a man who tells them about the Carlsons' family history. An Icelandic saga depicts them as cowards who failed to stop the barbarians from invading Iceland 1,000 years earlier and causing massive destruction. When they find Carl, they learn he came to clear his family name by buying a lost page from the saga that he hopes will reveal the Carlsons were brave warriors. He did not tell them earlier because he does not consider them true friends. An infuriated Lenny brawls with Carl.

The guys capture the lost page and abandon Carl. They plan to destroy the page, but a call from Marge makes them feel sympathetic towards Carl's plight. They translate the page to use the information to help him. However, they learn that the Carlson ancestors were not just cowards, but were, in fact, collaborators who joined the barbarians in looting, arson, and mass murder. This increases their sorrow for Carl. Gathering the Icelandic people, they explain the good deeds that Carl has done for them. Impressed by his good qualities, the people forgive the Carlson family so they can show their faces in public again. When Carl's father asks him how he cannot accept that Homer, Lenny and Moe are true friends, Carl cries and says that he cannot deny it. Back home, Carl thanks them for teaching him the values of friendship.

Homer, who planned to build a swimming pool with his winnings, creates mini-pools made of beer kegs with his friends that everyone enjoys except for Homer, who gets stuck in his pool.

== Production ==
The producers thought the original script was complicated, and the table read for the episode was confusing. Executive producer James L. Brooks suggested that the story focus on Lenny, so the producers changed the script to bring attention to Lenny's feelings.

The band Sigur Rós wrote original music for the episode and appeared as themselves. They also covered the show's theme song. Creator Matt Groening was a fan of the band and was honored to have their music in the episode.

To promote the episode, a poster was released showing Homer, Lenny, and Moe chasing Carl with Sigur Rós overhead. The episode was broadcast with the next episode as a one-hour season finale.

== Reception ==
=== Ratings ===
The episode received a 1.9 in the 18–49 demographic and was watched by a total of 4.01 million viewers. However, it was the second most watched show on Fox's Animation Domination lineup that night.

=== Critical response ===
Robert David Sullivan of The A.V. Club gave the episode a B−, saying "It’s not a very funny episode, but you get the sense that the animators enjoyed getting out of Springfield, and the score for the Iceland scenes, by indie rock group Sigur Ros, is at least a welcome change from the old-timey music that the show has been inexplicably fond of this season."

Teresa Lopez of TV Fanatic thought the episode was an excuse for a trip to Iceland. She also noted that the exploration of the feelings of Homer and his friends did not go deep enough.

In 2014, Vulture named this episode the 76th best episode of The Simpsons to stream and called it "a perceptive look at male friendship." In 2019, an updated ranking from Vulture named the episode the 77th best episode to watch. In 2024, another updated ranking from Vulture named the episode the 79th best episode to watch.
