= 1975 in anime =

- Years in anime: 1972 1973 1974 1975 1976 1977 1978
- Centuries: 19th century · 20th century · 21st century
- Decades: 1940s 1950s 1960s 1970s 1980s 1990s 2000s
- Years: 1972 1973 1974 1975 1976 1977 1978

The events of 1975 in anime.

== Releases ==
English name	Japanese name	Type	Demographic	Regions
Dog of Flanders	フランダースの犬 (Furandāsu no Inu)	TV	Family, Children	Japan, Korea, Spain, Italy, Germany, Arabia, Philippines, China (Taiwan)
Japanese Folklore Tales	まんが日本昔ばなし (Manga Nihon Mukashi Banashi)	TV	Family	Japan, Italy, Poland, Portugal
Great Mazinger vs. Getter Robo	グレートマジンガー対ゲッターロボ (Gurēto Majingā tai Gettā Robo)	Movie	Shōnen	Japan, France, Spain, Italy, Arabia
Get That Flying Saucer	これがUFOだ!空飛ぶ円盤 (Kore ga UFO da! Soratobu Enban)	Movie	Shōnen	Japan
The Little Mermaid	アンデルセン童話 にんぎょ姫 (Anderusen Dōwa Ningyo Hime)	Movie	Family, Children	Portugal, Japan, Spain, France, Italy, Poland, Russia, Arabia, United States
Maya the Honey Bee	みつばちマーヤの冒険 (Mitsubachi Māya no Bōken)	TV	Children	Portugal, Spain, Philippines, Germany, Italy, Netherlands, France, Japan, Poland, Arabia, China (Taiwan), Korea, United States, Canada, Australia, New Zealand, South Africa
Reideen the Brave	勇者ライディーン (Yūsha Raideen)	TV	Shōnen	Japan, Spain, Italy
La Seine no Hoshi	ラ・セーヌの星 (Ra Sēnu no Hoshi)	TV	Shōjo	Japan, Korea, France, Italy, Germany, China (Taiwan), China (Hong Kong)
The Don Chuck Story	ドン・チャック物語 (Don Chakku Monogatari)	TV	Children	Japan, France, Italy, Germany, Arabia, Russia
The Adventures of Gamba	ガンバの冒險 (Gamba no Bōken)	TV	Family, Children	Portugal, Japan, Spain, Italy, Russia, Arabia, China (Taiwan)
Young Tokugawa Ieyasu	少年徳川家康 (Shōnen Tokugawa Ieyasu)	TV	Family	Japan
Getter Robo G	ゲッターロボG (Gettā Robo Jī)	TV	Shōnen	Japan, United States, Italy, Philippines, Korea
Tekkaman: The Space Knight	宇宙の騎士テッカマン (Uchū no Kishi Tekkaman)	TV	Shōnen	Japan, Spain, Italy, United States
The Great War of the Space Saucers	宇宙円盤大戦争 (Uchū Enban Dai-Senso)	Movie	Shōnen	Japan, France, Italy
Great Mazinger vs. Getter Robo G: The Great Clash in the Sky	グレートマジンガー対ゲッターロボG 空中大激突 (Gurēto Majingā tai Gettā Robo Jī Kūchū Daigekitotsu)	Movie	Shōnen	Japan, French, Spain, Arabia
The Dolphin and the Boy	イルカと少年 (Iruka to Shōnen)	TV	Family, Children	Poland, France, Portugal, Italy, Japan, Canada
Dracula's Song	ドラキュラのうた (Dracula no Uta)	Special	Children	Japan
With One Courage As a Friend	勇気一つを友にして (Yūki Hitotsu wo Tomo ni Shite)	Special	Children	Japan
World Famous Fairy Tale Series	世界名作童話 (Sekai Meisaku Dōwa Kan)	TV	Family, Children	France, Italy, Germany, Japan, Philippines, United States
Arabian Nights: Sinbad's Adventures	アラビアンナイト シンドバットの冒険 (Arabian Naito: Shindobatto no Bōken)	TV	Family, Children	Japan, Spain, Poland, Italy, Netherlands, France, Germany, Arabia, China (Taiwan), Korea
Kum-Kum	わんぱく大昔クムクム (Wanpaku Omukashi Kumu Kumu)	TV	Family, Children	Portugal, France, Italy, Russia, Arabia, Japan, United Kingdom
Time Bokan	タイムボカン (Taimu Bokan)	TV	Shōnen	Japan, United States, Korea, Spain, Italy, Arabia, Russia
Steel Jeeg	鋼鉄ジーグ (Kōtetsu Jīgu)	TV	Shōnen	Japan, Spain, Italy, Philippines
UFO Robot Grendizer	UFOロボグレンダイザー (Yūfō Robo Gurendaizā)	TV	Shōnen	Italy, Spain, France, Arabia, Russia, Korea, Japan, Philippines, United States
The Original Genius Bakabon	元祖天才バカボン (Ganso Tensai Bakabon)	TV	Shōnen	Japan
The Adventures of Pepero	アンデス少年ペペロの冒険 (Andesu Shōnen Pepero no Bōken)	TV	Family, Children	Japan, Spain, Italy, Arabia
Laura, the Prairie Girl	草原の少女ローラ Sōgen no Shōjo Rōra)	TV	Family, Shōjo	Japan, Spain, Italy
Ikkyu the Little Monk	一休さん (Ikkyū-san)	TV	Family, Children	Italy, Russia, Arabia, Japan, China (Taiwan), China (Hong Kong), China (PRC)
The Water Seed	水のたね (Mizu no Tane)	Short	Family	Japan

== See also ==
- 1975 in animation
