= 1973 in anime =

- Years in anime: 1970 1971 1972 1973 1974 1975 1976
- Centuries: 19th century · 20th century · 21st century
- Decades: 1940s 1950s 1960s 1970s 1980s 1990s 2000s
- Years: 1970 1971 1972 1973 1974 1975 1976

The events of 1973 in anime.

== Releases ==
| English name | Japanese name | Type | Demographic | Regions |
|---|---|---|---|---|
| Babel II | バビル2世 (Babiru Ni-sei) | TV | Shōnen | Japan, Italy, Philippines |
| Demetan Croaker, The Boy Frog | けろっこデメタン (Kerokko Demetan) | TV | Children | Germany, Portugal, United States, France, Netherlands, Japan, Italy, Spain, Poland, Russia, Arabia, Korea |
| Fables of the Green Forest | 山ねずみロッキーチャック (Yama Nezumi Rokkī Chakku) | TV | Family, Children | Netherlands, France, Portugal, Spain, Italy, Romania, Germany, Japan, Russia, Arabia, Canada |
| Jungle Kurobe | ジャングル黒べえ (Janguru Kurobē) | TV | Children | Japan |
| Mazinger Z | 劇場版マジンガーZ (Gekijōban Majingā Zetto) | Movie | Shōnen | Japan |
| The Panda's Great Adventure | パンダの大冒険 (Panda no Daibōken) | Movie | Family, Children | Spain, France, Italy, Arabia, Japan |
| Doraemon | ドラえもん (Doraemon) | TV | Children | Japan |
| Little Wansa | ワンサくん (Wansa-kun) | TV | Children | Japan |
| Isamu, Boy of the Wilderness | 荒野の少年イサム (Kōya no Shōnen Isamu) | TV | Shōnen | Japan, Korea, French, Italy |
| Microsuperman | ミクロイドS (Mikuroido Esu) | TV | Shōnen | Japan, Italy |
| Belladonna of Sadness | 哀しみのベラドンナ (Kanashimi no Beradonna) | Movie | Adult | Japan, French, Spain, Germany, Portugal |
| Mazinger Z vs. Devilman | マジンガーZ対デビルマン (Majingā Zetto tai Debiruman) | Movie | Shōnen | Japan, French, Spain |
| Miracle Girl Limit-chan | ミラクル少女リミットちゃん (Mirakuru Shōjo Rimitto-chan) | TV | Shōjo | Japan, Italy |
| Zero Tester | ゼロテスター (Zerotesutā) | TV | Shōnen | Japan, Korea |
| Neo-Human Casshan | 新造人間キャシャーン (Shinzō Ningen Kyashān) | TV | Shōnen | Japan, Korea, French, Spain, Italy |
| Karate Master | 空手バカ一代 (Karate Baka Ichidai) | TV | Shōnen | Japan |
| The Little Judge from Hell | ドロロンえん魔くん (Dororon Enma-kun) | TV | Shōnen | Japan |
| Aim for the Ace! | エースをねらえ! (Ēsu o Nerae!) | TV | Shōjo | Japan, France, Spain, Italy, Russia |
| The Adventures of Korobokkuru | 冒険コロボックル (Bōken Korobokkuru) | TV | Family, Children | Italy, Arabia, Japan |
| Samurai Giants | 侍ジャイアンツ (Samurai Jaiantsu) | TV | Shōnen | Spain, Japan, China (Taiwan) |
| Cutey Honey | キューティーハニー (Kyūtī Hanī) | TV | Shōnen | Japan, France |
| Praise be to Small Ills | 南無一病息災 (Nanmu Ichibyou Sokusai) | Short | General | Japan |
| The Trip | 旅 (Tabi) | Short | General | Japan |

== Births ==
=== July ===
- July 26: Hiromasa Yonebayashi, Japanese animator and director (Studio Ghibli).

== Deaths ==
=== May ===
- May 26: Ōten Shimokawa Japanese artist anime pioneer dies at age 81.

== See also ==
- 1973 in animation
