= Family Classic Tales =

Family Classic Tales is an animated literature series that was originated and produced by Sydney-based Air Programs International (API). These cartoons were later aired on CBS. This series is similar to Famous Classic Tales.
