= Stewie Goes for a Drive =

- Family Guy episode
- Episode no.: Season 10; Episode 4
- Directed by: Julius Wu
- Written by: Gary Janetti
- Production code: 9ACX02
- Original air date: November 6, 2011

Guest appearances
- Adam Alexi-Malle; Ralph Garman as Mexican flatulence; Joe Lomonaco as Weenie; Rachael MacFarlane as Shelley Duvall; Ryan Reynolds as himself; Tara Strong as Android

Episode chronology
| ← Previous "Screams of Silence: The Story of Brenda Q" | Next → "Back to the Pilot" |
- Family Guy season 10

"Stewie Goes for a Drive" is the fourth episode of the tenth season of the animated comedy series Family Guy, and the 169th episode overall. It originally aired on Fox in the United States on November 6, 2011. The plot depicts actor Ryan Reynolds moving into the house across the street, and Peter Griffin befriending him. Ryan flirts with Peter, making Peter uncomfortable, and their friendship ends. Meanwhile, Stewie takes Brian's car for a joy ride, and crashes it into a lamp post. Fearing the consequences, Stewie runs away from home, but then needs Brian's help when he ends up in a bad part of town.

First announced at the 2011 San Diego Comic-Con, the episode was written by Gary Janetti and directed by Julius Wu. It received mixed reviews from critics for its storyline and cultural references. According to Nielsen ratings, it was viewed in 5.73 million homes in its original airing. In addition to Reynolds, who voiced himself, the episode featured guest performances by Adam Alexi-Malle, Ralph Garman, Joe Lomonaco, Rachael MacFarlane, Tara Strong, and Wendee Lee, along with several recurring guest voice actors.

== Plot ==
Brian picks up Stewie from a play date. On the drive home, Stewie listens to "Before He Cheats" by Carrie Underwood on the radio and decides to stay in the car by himself to continue listening after they reach home and accidentally hits the gear shift, causing the car to move forward, he then quickly puts the gear shift back into park and the car stops. Thinking he can drive, Stewie takes the car for a ride and is thrilled by the experience. He hears on the car radio a contest to win Justin Bieber concert tickets. Stewie calls the radio station on his cell phone to try to win but becomes too nervous to talk so he hands the phone to Rupert. In the process, he takes his eyes off the road, loses control of the car, and crashes into a lamp post head-on, destroying the front end of the car. Stewie is uninjured and limps the totaled car home and hopes Brian will not notice. Unfortunately for Stewie, Brian does notice the damage and the fact that he left Rupert in the car and immediately confronts Stewie. He scolds Stewie not just for wrecking his car, but for also putting himself in a position where he could have gotten himself killed. Brian then says he will tell Peter and Lois to make sure that Stewie learns his lesson. Afraid of being punished, Stewie runs away and leaves a CD-ROM for Brian detailing his plans.

Stewie takes the bus to the airport, but ends up in the wrong neighborhood where Consuela, the Griffin family's former maid, finds him and takes him home. Brian finds Stewie, and tells him that he feels that it was partly his fault that the car accident occurred, admits he should not have left Stewie alone in the car, and promises not to tell anyone if Stewie promises to never drive his car again. They attempt to leave Consuela's home, but she insists on keeping Stewie as her own baby. After a relative of Consuela's threatens Brian with a gun for attempting to take Stewie back, Stewie grabs the gun and shoots Consuela in the foot, then fires shots into the air, scaring the home guests and giving him and Brian the opportunity to return home, although Stewie states that he did not want to hurt her, stating that they were very nice to him up until when they didn't let him return home.

On their way out of the doctor's office, actor Ryan Reynolds asks Peter and Lois for directions. He seems very appreciative of Peter. The next morning Peter notices that Ryan has moved in across the street, taking Cleveland Brown's former residence. Ryan says he is filming for a movie nearby. Peter attends Ryan's housewarming party that night, at which Ryan tickles him and requests that he return the favor. Later that week, they go out to dinner, but Peter immediately flees the restaurant when Ryan tries to kiss him. The next day, Peter tells a disbelieving Lois he believes Ryan may be gay. Peter confronts Ryan, who replies that he is only attracted to Peter's spirit in the way that a man is attracted to a woman. Angered by Peter's accusation, Ryan orders him to leave, but hands him a cell phone so they can "always talk".

== Production and development ==
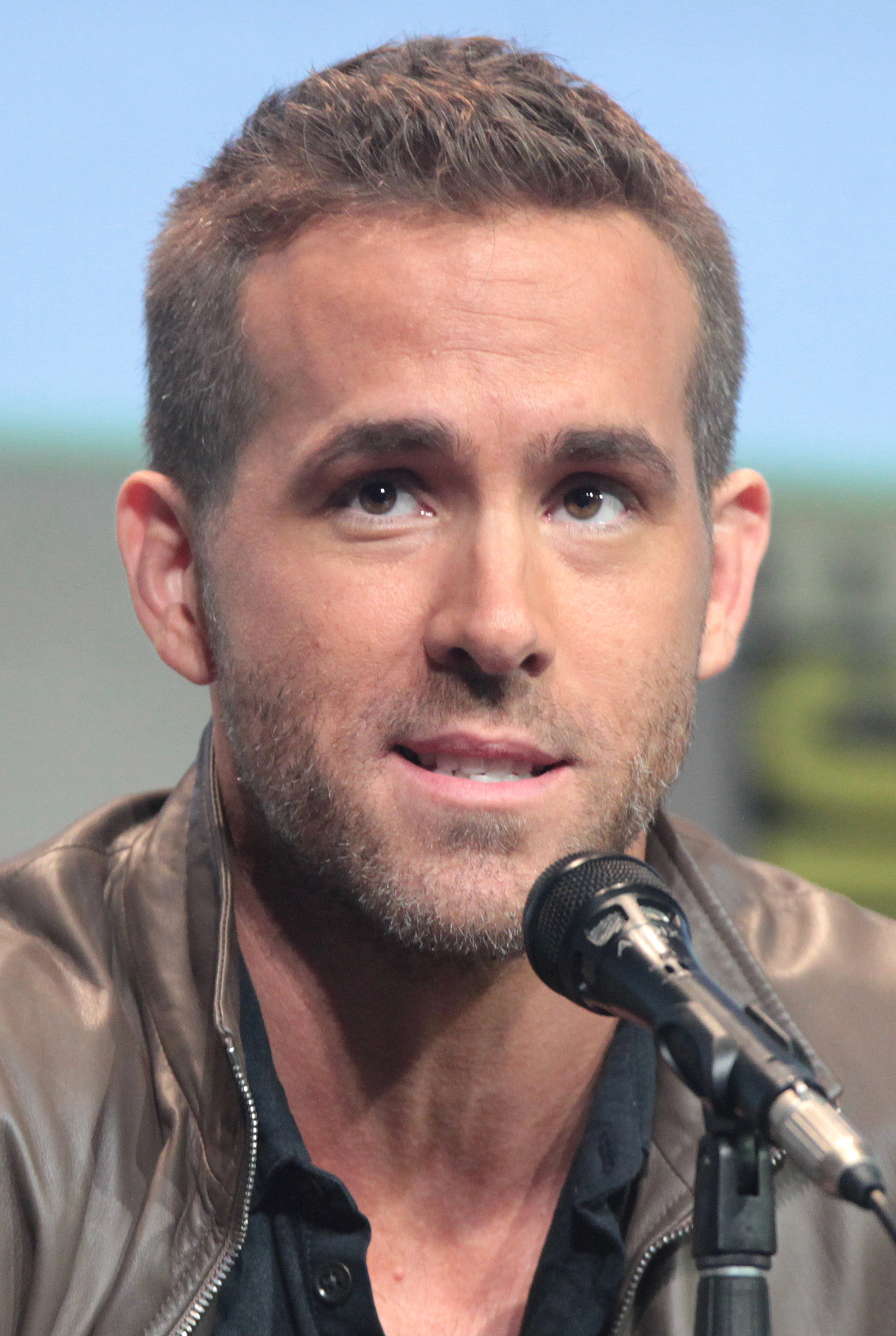
Actor Ryan Reynolds guest-starred in the episode as himself.

First announced at the 2011 San Diego Comic-Con by series showrunners Steve Callaghan and Mark Hentemann, the episode was written by Gary Janetti. Janetti joined the series in its first season, writing "Brian: Portrait of a Dog", as well as the series' landmark 150th episode "Brian & Stewie". It was directed by Julius Wu, who joined the show in its fifth season, directing "The Tan Aquatic with Steve Zissou". Series regulars Peter Shin and James Purdum served as supervising director, with Andrew Goldberg, Alex Carter, Spencer Porter, Anthony Blasucci, Mike Desilets, and Deepak Sethi serving as staff writers for the episode. Composer Ron Jones, who has worked on the series since its inception, returned to compose the music for "Stewie Goes for a Drive". An announcement of Reynolds' appearance in the episode was made at the Television Critics Association's summer press tour, along with several other guest voice actors for the season.

In addition to the regular cast, actor and musician Adam Alexi-Malle, actor Ralph Garman, voice actor Joe Lomonaco, voice actress Rachael MacFarlane, actor Ryan Reynolds, and voice actress Tara Strong guest-starred in the episode. Recurring guest voice actors Alec Sulkin, writer John Viener, and writer Wellesley Wild made minor appearances throughout the episode.

== Cultural references ==
In the opening scene of the episode when Peter and Lois first meet actor Ryan Reynolds, Reynolds lists various movies he has appeared in, including the 2009 film The Proposal and the 2011 film The Change-Up. Impressed by Ryan's demeanor towards him, Peter then recalls meeting actress Shelley Duvall, which he did not enjoy, even though Duvall is shown being friendly. Reynolds also reveals that he will be portraying Nazi leader Adolf Hitler in a film entitled Hotler, which is being filmed in Quahog rather than nearby Newport, Rhode Island.

Later, as Brian and Stewie drive home from his day care, they listen to the 2006 single "Before He Cheats" on the car's radio, sung by American Idol winner Carrie Underwood. Stewie stays in the car after arriving home to listen to the rest of the song, and sings along. Pleased with himself, he decides he should appear on the Fox television series Glee. Later Stewie learns of a contest to win tickets to a local Justin Bieber concert, but ultimately he loses the contest to his neighbor, Herbert. After returning home, Stewie begins watching a film parodying various 1970s science fiction movies (including music parodying the 1976 Michael York film Logan's Run) before being accused by Brian of crashing his car. When Stewie tries to reject blame for the incident, Brian tells him that he must accept his punishment, and compares it to the television game show The Price Is Right, in which a woman is shown accepting a poor showcase, involving a weeklong trip to her parents’ house in Wilmington, Delaware. Stewie then runs away from home, leaving a video message for Brian asking Brian to rescue him in a TV-movie-clichéd way at the airport, and to bring appropriate soundtrack music, suggesting "With or Without You" by U2, "Solsbury Hill" by Peter Gabriel, "Unwritten" by Natasha Bedingfield, "Live Like We're Dying" by Kris Allen, "Thank You" by Dido, and "Somebody" by Depeche Mode.

== Reception ==
"Stewie Goes for a Drive" was broadcast on November 6, 2011, as a part of an animated television night on Fox, and was preceded by The Simpsons and Allen Gregory, and followed by Family Guy creator and executive producer Seth MacFarlane's second show, American Dad!. It was watched by 5.73 million viewers, according to Nielsen ratings, despite airing simultaneously with Desperate Housewives on ABC, The Good Wife on CBS, and Sunday Night Football on NBC. The episode also acquired a 3.0/7 rating in the 18–49 demographic, beating Allen Gregory and American Dad, in addition to significantly edging out both shows in total viewership. The episode's ratings decreased somewhat from the previous week's episode, "Screams of Silence: The Story of Brenda Q".

Reviews of the episode were mostly mixed, calling the storyline a "much less extreme reversal" of the season two episode "The Story on Page One", in which Peter attempts to seduce actor Luke Perry. Kevin McFarland of The A.V. Club wrote of the episode, "It was disappointing to see Family Guy bury a guest star like Kaitlin Olson in the background for much of her episode as Quagmire's sister last week, but it was even worse to see the show waste Ryan Reynolds." He continued, "He may not fit an empirical definition of a movie star, but I think he’s worth more as a guest than a tired trope like playing himself as a sexual predator towards Peter." McFarland also criticized the episode's two storylines, noting, "Both plots paint themselves into a corner with no time to get out. In the third act, Stewie is trapped at Consuela's house and Peter hadn't succumbed to Reynolds' repetitive and slowly escalating advances or done anything about them, so the show snaps its fingers and ends each one prematurely." He graded the episode as a C−. In a much more positive review, Terron R. Moore of Ology criticized the episode for not featuring Griffin family siblings Chris and Meg, but praised the series for adopting a Stewie-centric storyline. Moore noted of the storyline involving Reynolds, "All pretty funny stuff, but Ryan Reynolds' entire guest slot is based on the fact that you like Ryan Reynolds and his occasionally homoerotic humor, which I can definitely appreciate." He concluded his review by writing, "Not the best Family Guy, but a definite improvement on the week before, using some of the elements it knows best." Andy Neuenschwander of Yidio also gave mixed reaction to the episode, writing, "Something happens whenever a celebrity shows up on "Family Guy" and plays themselves. I can't quite put my finger on it, but everything just feels a bit off. This episode, which featured Ryan Reynolds as Ryan Reynolds, only confirmed that feeling." He also compared it to The Simpsons, noting, "Maybe it's the way the celebrity is treated as a character: in shows like The Simpsons, celebrities who play themselves appear as a relatively normal version of themselves [...] But on Family Guy, celebrities tend to appear as some bizarro version of themselves."
