= Screams of Silence: The Story of Brenda Q =

- Family Guy episode
- Jeff (center) yelling at Brenda (left), who has tears in her eyes; Quagmire (right) observes the situation.
- Episode no.: Season 10; Episode 3
- Directed by: Dominic Bianchi
- Written by: Alec Sulkin
- Production code: 8ACX21
- Original air date: October 30, 2011

Guest appearance
- Kaitlin Olson as Brenda Quagmire

Episode chronology
← Previous "Seahorse Seashell Party"	Next → "Stewie Goes for a Drive"
- Family Guy season 10

"Screams of Silence: The Story of Brenda Q" is the third episode of the tenth season of the animated comedy series Family Guy, and the 168th episode overall. It originally aired on Fox in the United States on October 30, 2011. The episode follows Brenda, Griffin family neighbor Glenn Quagmire's sister, as she struggles with physical and mental abuse at the hands of her psychotic boyfriend, and eventual fiancé, Jeff. Quagmire, along with his neighbors, Peter and Joe, seek to relieve Brenda from her torment, and soon decide to murder Jeff in order to prevent her from being harmed any further.

The episode was written by Alec Sulkin and directed by Dominic Bianchi. This episode generated significant controversy from various media organizations and critics for its portrayal of domestic violence, which, unusually for Family Guy, is portrayed in a serious manner. An estimated 5.97 million homes viewed the episode in its original airing according to Nielsen ratings. The episode featured a guest performance by Kaitlin Olson along with several recurring guest voice actors for the series.

== Plot ==
Peter decides to go fishing with Quagmire and Joe, but when Quagmire does not show up, the two go to his house, where they find him unconscious as a result of hanging himself in an autoerotic asphyxiation. Attempting to save his life, they take him to the hospital, where his sister, Brenda, comes to visit and manages to wake her brother up from his coma. Brenda also brings along Jeff, her obnoxious, aggressive and abusive "boyfriend", who harasses her throughout the night, to the concern of Quagmire and his neighbors.

After a horrible night, Quagmire asks Lois to talk to Brenda about Jeff. When Lois and Brenda talk over lunch, Lois requests that Brenda remove her sunglasses, revealing a bruise over her eye. Upon seeing this, Lois tries to convince Brenda to leave Jeff, but Brenda only makes excuses for Jeff's treatment of her, to Lois' disgust. Later, at the bar, Peter, Quagmire and Joe discuss the matter, and Joe says that the police are unable to intervene unless Brenda files a formal complaint, but suggests that the group have an intervention with Brenda. There, Quagmire confesses that the sister he knew growing up no longer exists, and he wants her back. The two then embrace each other until Jeff enters the intervention, causing Quagmire to tell him that Brenda has agreed to leave him. Pressured by Jeff, Brenda reveals that the two are engaged and that she is pregnant.

Later that evening, Peter, Quagmire and Joe discuss killing Jeff, with Joe, being a police officer, opposing it on the grounds that Quagmire could be arrested for murder regardless, while Quagmire says that men like Jeff never change. When the trio witness Jeff hit Brenda for simply changing the channel on Quagmire's TV, Joe agrees to help the group kill Jeff. The three decide to talk Jeff into a hunting trip in an attempt to kill him, and make it look like an accident. Jeff, having anticipated this, reveals his own gun, and knocks out Peter and Joe so that he can kill Quagmire in a deeper part of the woods. Once there, Quagmire talks Jeff into fighting him instead, during which Quagmire is seemingly strangled to death. Jeff then begins digging a grave, but then the headlights of Peter's car come on and he sees Quagmire, alive, behind the wheel. Quagmire kills Jeff by ramming him with the car and smashing him into a tree.

Peter, Joe and Quagmire return home the next day, and present a heartbroken Brenda with a forged note from Jeff stating that he has decided to leave her, without telling her that he is dead.

== Production and development ==
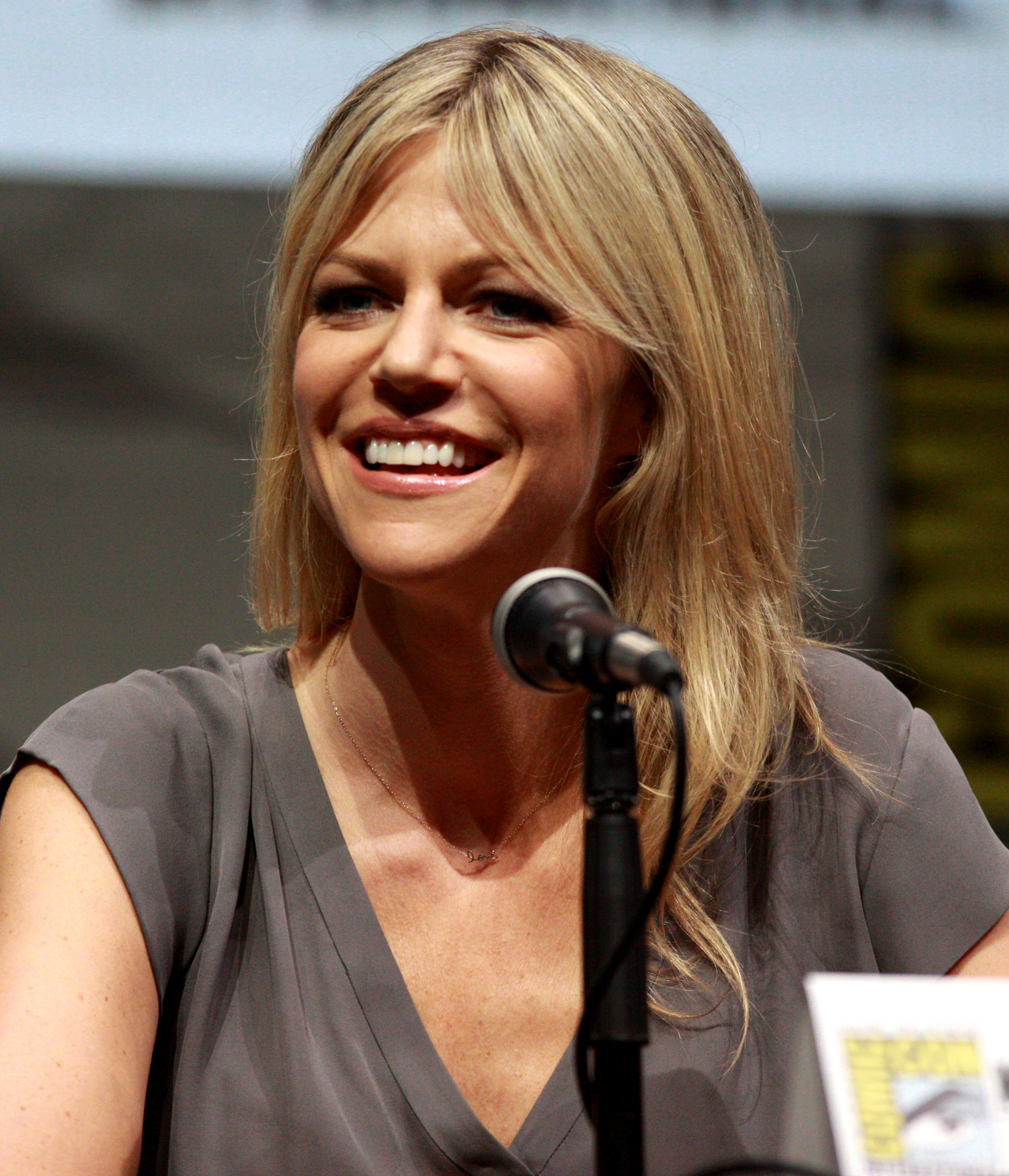
Kaitlin Olson guest starred in the episode.

The episode was written by series regular, and executive producer, Alec Sulkin, who previously wrote the Family Guy, Star Wars parody "Blue Harvest", as well as "Stew-Roids", and the final installment of the Stewie Griffin: The Untold Story series. The episode was directed by series regular Dominic Bianchi, who previously directed the series's landmark 150th episode "Brian & Stewie". Series regulars Peter Shin and James Purdum served as supervising director, with Andrew Goldberg, Alex Carter, Spencer Porter, and Elaine Ko serving as staff writers for the episode. Composer Walter Murphy, who has worked on the series since its inception, returned to compose the music for "Screams of Silence: The Story of Brenda Q".

In addition to the regular cast, actress Kaitlin Olson guest starred in the episode as Brenda Quagmire, making her the second cast member from It's Always Sunny in Philadelphia to appear on a Seth MacFarlane show, after Glenn Howerton on The Cleveland Show, a spinoff of Family Guy. Recurring guest voice actress Alexandra Breckenridge, writers Gary Janetti and Alec Sulkin, actress Jennifer Tilly, actor Patrick Warburton, and writer John Viener made minor appearances throughout the episode. Recurring guest voice actor Ralph Garman provided the voice of Jeff.

== Reception ==
=== Ratings ===
"Screams of Silence: The Story of Brenda Q" was broadcast on October 30, 2011, as a part of an animated television night on Fox, and was preceded by The Simpsons and the series premiere of the animated series Allen Gregory, and followed by Family Guy creator and executive producer Seth MacFarlane's spin-off, The Cleveland Show. It was watched by 5.97 million viewers, according to Nielsen ratings, despite airing simultaneously with Desperate Housewives on ABC, The Amazing Race on CBS and Sunday Night Football on NBC. The episode also acquired a 3.2/7 rating in the 18–49 demographic group, beating Allen Gregory and The Cleveland Show in addition to significantly edging out both shows in total viewership. The episode's ratings decreased significantly from the previous episode, "Seahorse Seashell Party".

In the UK, the episode achieved 1.26 million views during its debut on BBC Three.

=== Critical reception and controversy ===
This episode received negative critical reviews. Kevin McFarland of The A.V. Club wrote of the episode, "A serious episode of Family Guy cripples the show’s strengths." McFarland also wrote, "while other shows, even the procedurals with grisly murders, are playing around in Halloween specials, Family Guy went for an episode about domestic abuse that wrote off any chance that comedy could save it if things took a wrong turn." He went on to criticize it for its tone, noting "An episode like this only works if the bits of comedy surrounding the serious plot create contrast to the darker main story, but they weren't here."

McFarland praised Kaitlin Olson's portrayal of Brenda, however, stating "Olson got some laughs out of just how deep Brenda’s denial went, finding every possible excuse to blame herself and exonerate Jeff. It made her endearing and easily likeable, every bit the opposite from Olson's place in the rogue’s gallery of misanthropy on It's Always Sunny in Philadelphia." He ended his review by comparing it to the fellow Fox animated series The Simpsons, noting, "The Simpsons managed to find the right blend with Sideshow Bob episodes, or in the aching sadness of Homer and Marge's marriage, but as has been said ad infinitum, Family Guy hasn't mastered that combination in the same way as the original." He graded the episode as C+.

Terron R. Moore of Ology gave the episode a slightly more positive review, writing, ""The Story Of Brenda Q", judging by only the title, could have been a Lifetime movie in the Seth MacFarlane fashion or anything else than a typical episode of the show, but it was pretty much a typical episode of the show." He continued, "it's pretty much an episode where someone on the Family Guy writing staff needed a new way to get out a bunch of pent-up misogyny and anger." He gave the episode a grade of seven out of ten.

Reaction to the episode by news media organizations was extremely negative and caused controversy, criticizing the episode for its portrayal of domestic violence. A. J. Hammer of Showbiz Tonight said of the episode, "Like so many other people, I was just shocked by what I saw on Family Guy last night," and continued, "It was really just a depressing half hour of television." In the same interview, Hammer asked television host Wendy Walsh of The Doctors about the storyline, to which she responded, "The main theme of the show was about this poor 'stupid' woman who was too dumb to leave her relationship. And domestic violence is far more complicated than that. We're watching someone rationalize a domestic violence relationship and this is the kind of thought process that actually goes on in real life. It’s not satire anymore."

Nando Di Fino of Mediaite also complained that the episode may have gone too far, and compared it to previous episodes in the series that had been banned from airing on television, noting, "The show has dipped into sensitive material before, and Fox has actually refused to air two episodes — one dealing with abortion, the other with heavy Jewish themes. Sunday night's episode, if reaction to it can be used as a good measure, may have been better joining those two episodes in exile." Whitney Jefferson of Jezebel, a website centered on women's issues, also strongly criticized the episode for its storyline involving Brenda and her boyfriend, Jeff: "Personally, I'm way beyond being offended by the show — I've long been numbed to shock-value offensiveness — and had stopped watching years ago anyhow. But being a sucker for a Halloween-themed episodes, I tuned in to Fox's "Animation Domination" comedy block last night. What I saw was seriously awful." Jefferson ended her review of the episode by stating that the show was "Definitely the scariest Halloween special we've ever seen."
