= Dangers on a Train =

- The Simpsons episode
- Episode no.: Season 24; Episode 22
- Directed by: Steven Dean Moore
- Written by: Michael Price
- Production code: RABF17
- Original air date: May 19, 2013

Guest appearances
- Lisa Lampanelli as Ramona; Seth MacFarlane as Ben

Episode features
- Couch gag: Two winners for the "Create-A-Couch Gag" contest: in America, the winning couch gag shows five dandelions on the couch that bloom and turn white. When the TV sneezes, the dandelion seeds scatter and turn into hundreds of Homers, Marges, Barts, Lisas, and Maggies. In Canada (save for Quebec), the winning couch gag shows the Simpsons sitting with a Canadian loon, John A. Macdonald, a beaver, and a hockey player.

Episode chronology
← Previous "The Saga of Carl"	Next → "Homerland"
- The Simpsons season 24

"Dangers on a Train" is the twenty-second and final episode of the twenty-fourth season of the American animated television series The Simpsons, and the 530th episode overall. The episode was directed by Steven Dean Moore and written by Michael Price. It first aired on the Fox network in the United States on May 19, 2013. The name of the episode is a reference to the film Strangers on a Train.

In this episode, Marge bonds with a married man while Homer rebuilds a train for his wedding anniversary gift. Lisa Lampanelli and Seth MacFarlane guest starred. The episode received mixed reviews.

== Plot ==
As Homer and Marge's wedding anniversary approaches, Homer remembers how they celebrated their first one: by visiting an outdoor mall and riding its miniature train, "Li'l Lisa." Homer visits the mall, intending to bring Marge back for this year's anniversary, but finds that it has become a run-down wreck. Taking the dismantled train home, he enlists his bar buddies and Reverend Lovejoy to help him refurbish it. Meanwhile, Marge goes online to order a batch of Dolly Madison snack cakes for Homer, but inadvertently ends up on a site called Sassy Madison (a parody of Ashley Madison), which helps married people set up affairs. She quickly receives a deluge of invitations from perverted men; while deleting them, she finds a message from a likable guy named Ben and starts talking with him. At first she tries to brush him off, but the two soon find that they share an appreciation for the British drama series Upton Rectory (a spoof of Downton Abbey). Homer continues to work on his train project in secret, alienating Marge.

On the day of their anniversary, Homer fakes a back injury and sends Marge across Springfield to pick up a prescription for him. With her gone, he and his friends set up the train to run around the house. As she drives, Marge experiences visions of Ben, mentally pushing them away while bemoaning the state of her marriage at the same time. When she returns home, she sees the train, now renamed "Majestic Marge," and forgives Homer. Ben's wife Ramona confronts the couple over Marge's secret correspondence with Ben, but Homer and Marge explain that two people in a healthy relationship should not keep secrets from one another. Homer decides that Marge does not have to tell him how she came to know Ben, and Ramona tells Ben that the two of them are going to become closer by reviewing his computer browser history, much to his surprise. Ben returns to Sassy Madison and makes contact with a new woman, but runs away screaming when she turns out to be Selma.

== Production ==
=== Development ===
A contest was announced during the season premiere to submit ideas for a couch gag. The producers to would select up to three finalists and fans would vote for the winner. The winner's idea would appear in the season finale, which was this episode. The winner would also visit The Simpsons's studio, attend a table read and receive an illustration of the couch gag and a prize pack. Creator Matt Groening stated that people send in ideas for couch gags all the time, so the producers decided to make it a contest. The winner was announced to be Cheryl Brown's "Dandelions". A Canadian winner, named Ray Savaya, was also selected. His idea for the couch gag was to make it "as Canadian as possible" and the couch gag aired exclusively in Canada. He received a similar prize as the winner and was able to talk with Lisa Simpson voice actress Yeardley Smith.

=== Casting ===
In November 2012, Entertainment Weekly reported that Seth MacFarlane would guest star as Ben, who attempts to have an affair with Marge Simpson. Executive producer Al Jean thought the role was a fit for MacFarlane because of his voice. He also noted the friendly rivalry with MacFarlane because of his shows that air on Sundays on Fox and included a joke in the episode that is a nod to it. Comedian Lisa Lampanelli guest starred as Ben's wife.

=== Release ===
The episode was originally scheduled to air as the twenty-fifth season premiere. The episode "The Man Who Came to Be Dinner" was originally scheduled to air as the season finale. That episode was held back because the producers considered expanding that episode into a film, but it aired as part of the twenty-sixth season. This episode was then moved up to be the season finale. It aired in the 8:30 PM timeslot as part of a one-hour season finale with the previous episode.

== Reception ==
=== Ratings ===
The episode received a 2.1 in the 18-49 demographic and was watched by a total of 4.52 million viewers. This made it the second most watched show on Fox's Animation Domination line up that night, beating two episodes of The Cleveland Show but losing to the one-hour Family Guy finale with 5.28 million.

=== Critical reception ===
Robert David Sullivan of The A.V. Club gave the episode a C+, saying, "Dangers on a Train’ is more standard 2013 Simpsons fare, with another trip to the bottomless well of stories about Marge feeling neglected by Homer as their 10th anniversary nears. There's no monorail-type disaster this time, and ‘Dangers on a Train’ has one of the simpler and sweeter Homer-and-Marge reconciliations."

Teresa Lopez of TV Fanatic gave the episode three out of five stars, saying, "The only thing that elevated this episode above the mundane was a Downton Abbey parody. Marge and Ben's obsession with the costume-drama Upton Rectory perfectly captured the global preoccupation with the PBS show. Seth MacFarlane also provided an amusing addition to the episode, but he pulled his usual shtick of using his Stewie voice and Sinatra-style singing, which was definitely suffering from the law of diminishing returns."
