= Mystery of the Necronomicon =

Hentai anime created in 2001

- Cover from the first English DVD release of Mystery of the Necronomicon

黒の断章 (Kuro no Danshō)
- Genre: Erotic horror, Occult detective
- Original video animation
- Directed by: Hideki Takayama; Yoshitaka Makino
- Written by: Ryo Saga
- Music by: Hiroaki Sano; Kazuhiko Izu
- Studio: Discovery; Scare Crow
- Licensed by: NA: Critical Mass
- Released: 2001
- Runtime: 120 minutes
- Episodes: 4

Mystery of the Necronomicon (黒の断章, Kuro no Danshō) is a hentai anime created by Abogato Powers and released in 2001.

== Plot ==
Private detective Satoshi Suzuhara and his adoptive daughter, Asuka Kashiwagi, are spending time at an isolated ski resort. But when a snowstorm cuts off all links to the outside, Satoshi becomes the main suspect in a string of gruesome murders being committed on the resort guests. It becomes a race against time as Satoshi must find out who is really behind the murders.
