= Homerland =

- The Simpsons episode
- Promotional artwork of the episode which is a parody of Homeland.
- Episode no.: Season 25; Episode 1
- Directed by: Bob Anderson
- Written by: Stephanie Gillis
- Production code: RABF20
- Original air date: September 29, 2013

Guest appearances
- Kristen Wiig as Annie Crawford; Kevin Michael Richardson as an unnamed FBI agent

Episode features
- Chalkboard gag: "25 years and they can't come up with a new punishment?"
- Couch gag: Similar to the couch gag for season 11's "E-I-E-I-(Annoyed Grunt)", season 17's "The Bonfire of the Manatees" and season 22's "Elementary School Musical", the couch is roped off and a bouncer lets Marge, Lisa, Bart, and Maggie in, but not Homer in celebration of The Simpsons milestone 25th season. The end credits continue the couch gag by showing everyone in Springfield (and the characters from Family Guy, American Dad!, Bob's Burgers, and The Cleveland Show) being let in while Homer is still turned away, and ends up getting tasered.

Episode chronology
← Previous "Dangers on a Train"	Next → "Treehouse of Horror XXIV"
- The Simpsons season 25

"Homerland" (styled as "HOMƎRLAND") is the first episode of the twenty-fifth season of the American animated television series The Simpsons and the 531st episode of the series overall. It originally aired on the Fox network in the United States on September 29, 2013. It was written by Stephanie Gillis and directed by Bob Anderson.

In this episode, Lisa is concerned about Homer's changed personality after returning from a conference and calls the FBI. It guest-stars Kristen Wiig as Annie Crawford and Kevin Michael Richardson as an unnamed FBI agent. The episode received positive reviews. The episode's title and plot is a reference to the Primetime Emmy Award-winning TV series Homeland.

== Plot ==
Homer, Lenny, and Carl attend a nuclear power convention in Boise, Idaho. They use the occasion to drink heavily and collect free merchandise. Although they are ejected from the convention for their behavior, they attend the convention party. When Homer is due to arrive home, the Simpson family waits to greet Homer at the airport, but he fails to appear.

Homer returns later with changes in his behavior: he no longer strangles Bart when provoked, he refuses to eat pork chops or drink beer, and he appears to prostrate himself on a mat while facing the Middle East. He has flashbacks of entering a van and being clamped to a chair with headphones on. Overhearing Chief Wiggum and Apu talk about a rumored terrorist in Springfield, Lisa suspects Homer was kidnapped and indoctrinated to carry out an attack. When she sees him looking at blueprints of the power plant, she notifies the FBI.

Agent Annie Crawford, who has bipolar disorder, investigates. She infiltrates Bart and Milhouse's sleepover, and slips into bed with Homer and Marge to interrogate him. Later, Homer brings a tarp-covered device to the plant and sets it up in the basement. Lisa tries to prevent Homer from destroying it, but he says he is ensuring the plant will no longer damage the environment. His device is a tank filled with sour milk and spoiled chicken, which he plans to pump into the air conditioning system so the stench drives everyone away.

The truth is revealed: Homer overslept and missed his flight. He was given a ride home in a van used by ecological activists. Along the way, they persuaded him to become a vegetarian, convinced him of the plant's destructive effects, and put him through an alcohol detoxification treatment by listening to music while being clamped to a chair in a sauna. Homer's mat is a rug marked with affirmations in small print, forcing him to kneel to read them.

Annie and her team enter and restrain Homer, but Lisa activates the device because they have a common desire to see the plant shut down. The mission fails because the air conditioning system never worked properly; this turns out to be a safety violation, forcing the plant to shut down temporarily, and Mr. Burns is arrested. Lisa hopes Homer might retain his new behavior, but he reverts to his old ways upon drinking a beer. Leaving, Annie takes a dose of medication for her bipolar disorder, turning the dreary city block into a vivid rainbow daze.

== Production ==
In May 2013, Entertainment Weekly reported that Kristen Wiig was cast as an FBI agent. Wiig previously guest starred in the twenty-second season episode "Flaming Moe" as a different character. Executive producer Al Jean described the character as someone who wants to arrest Homer but is also in love with him.

The episode acknowledged the twenty-fifth season of the show with the chalkboard gag.

== Cultural references ==
The episode is a parody of the television series Homeland. The start of the episode opens with a parody of the title sequence from that series. During the alcohol detox scene, Homer is listening to "Shakedown Street" by Grateful Dead.

== Reception ==
=== Critical response ===
The episode received generally positive reviews.

Dennis Perkins of The A.V. Club gave the episode B−, saying "In the end, there are some funny lines, the gimmick doesn’t completely overwhelm the narrative, and things are back in place for the next episode. It’s not the worst omen for a new season of The Simpsons. I'm looking forward to it with guarded optimism and an open mind."

Teresa Lopez of TV Fanatic gave the episode four out of five stars — signifying a positive review — saying "The Simpsons has always done an excellent job with parody, and tonight was no exception. First, the show opened with clever Springfield version of the Homeland opening, before creating the perfect amount of creepiness of Homer's change. His sudden abstinence from both pork and alcohol were one thing, but then he went and used a napkin. He exactly mirrored Brody's calm focus and it was quite amusing."

Tony Sokol of Den of Geek gave the episode a 3 out of 5. He thought the episode was "good, not great" and liked the various sight gags in the episode. In 2023, he named this episode the fourth-best episode of The Simpsons from the 2010s.

=== Viewing figures ===
In its original broadcast, the episode was watched by 6.37 million viewers, averaged a 2.9 rating among A18–49, and was the highest-rated show on Animation Domination that night.
