= Ana Lúcia Menezes =

Brazilian voice actress (1975–2021)

- Born: Ana Lúcia Alves de Menezes; 22 January 1975 (Note: Although there are sources indicating Ana Lúcia's birth as 5 February, the voice actress's daughter, Bia, revealed on her mother's Instagram that she was born on 22 January.); Recife, Pernambuco, Brazil
- Died: 20 April 2021 (aged 46); Rio de Janeiro, Brazil
- Occupations: Voice actress; voice director
- Years active: 1987–2021
- Children: 1 (Bia Menezes)

Ana Lúcia Alves de Menezes (22 January 1975 – 20 April 2021), also known as Ana Lúcia Granjeiro, was a Brazilian voice actress and voice director. Some of her notable dubbing roles included Sam Puckett in iCarly, Suzy Sheep in Peppa Pig, Laura in the Mexican telenovela Carrusel, Rory Gilmore in Gilmore Girls, and Maite Perroni in various roles.

She was nominated three times for the Yamato Award: best actress in 2004 for Chihiro Ogino in Spirited Away, best supporting actress in 2005 for Koto in Yu Yu Hakusho, and best actress in 2010 for Misa Amane in Death Note, which she won.

== Personal life and death ==
Menezes also practiced taekwondo, competing in tournaments at the International Taekwon-Do Federation. She won a bronze medal in the 1997 World Cup.

Menezes died from a stroke in Rio de Janeiro on 20 April 2021. According to doctors, the stroke was caused by cerebral thrombosis which may have been caused by a reinfection of COVID-19 that she had at the end of 2020.

== Dubbing ==
- Amy Rose in Sonic X and Sonic Boom
- Aria Montgomery in Pretty Little Liars
- Sam Puckett in iCarly and Sam & Cat
- Koto in YuYu Hakusho
- Dulce Maria in Carita de ángel
- Po in Teletubbies
- Gwen Tennyson in Ben 10
- Tanya Sloan in Power Rangers Zeo and Power Rangers Turbo
- Kira Ford in Power Rangers Dino Thunder
- Vida Rocca in Power Rangers Mystic Force
- Vada in My Girl
- Stella in Winx Club
- Maite Perroni in Rebelde, RBD: La familia, Cuidado con el ángel, Mi pecado, The Stray Cat, and Triunfo del amor
- Sophie Sheridan in Mamma Mia! and Mamma Mia! Here We Go Again
- Toph Beifong in Avatar: The Last Airbender
- Hilda in Hilda
- Poof and Trixie Tang in The Fairly OddParents
- Jasmine Fenton in Danny Phantom
- Chihiro Ogino in Spirited Away
- Bridgette in Total Drama and Total DramaRama
- Diego and Mariam in Beyblade
- Misa Amane in Death Note
- Ikon Eron in Gormiti
- D.W. Read in Arthur (opening and first episode only)
- Daisy Watkins in Static Shock
- Rosalie "Ro" Rowan in The Zeta Project
- Pippa the Poppy Fairy in rainbow magic the series

== Awards and nominations ==
Year	Award	Category	Work	Result	Ref.
2004	Yamato Award	Best Actress	Spirited Away	Nominated	
2005	Yamato Award	Best Supporting Actress	Yu Yu Hakusho	Nominated	
2010	Yamato Award	Best Voice Over in Anime	Death Note	Won	
