= Little 8th Route Army =

- Directed by: Lei You
- Production company: Shanghai Animation Film Studio
- Release date: 1973
- Running time: 5 reels
- Country: China
- Language: Mandarin

Little 8th Route Army (Chinese: 小八路) is a stop motion Chinese animated puppet film. It is also referred to as "Little 8th Route Heroes" and "Small 8th Route Army".

== Background ==
The film was produced and released under the term of chairman Mao Zedong when the cultural revolution was still ongoing. The plot backdrop is based on the National Revolutionary Army's 8th Route Army division, when it was under the control of Chinese Communist Party instead of the opposing Kuomintang. Despite numerous movie adaptations, this is the only animation piece ever produced on the subject. A story book was also released as a companion to the film.

== Story ==
The story takes place during the Second Sino-Japanese War. The Imperial Japanese Army enters a village in northern China where young Huzi (虎子) is involved in the anti-Japanese movement. His sister is captured as part of the village sweep. Huzi seeks revenge and is rescued by an 8th Route Army chief named Yang. Afterwards, Huzi and the party restore the grain supplies and go on the offensive against the Japanese forces. Eventually Huzi himself is admitted to the 8th Route division.

== Adaptations ==
The first documentary on the subject was the 1938 (延安和八路军). The first movie to come before this puppetry animation was the 1961 "Little Heroes" (英雄小八路). Two movies were also made in 1978 "Two Young 8th Route Army Soldiers" (两个小八路) and "We are the 8th Route Army Men" (我们是八路军).
