= Famous Classic Tales =

- Genre: Anthology; Television special
- Countries of origin: United States; Australia
- Original language: English
- No. of episodes: 31

Production
- Producers: Neil Balnaves; Walter J. Hucker; William Hanna; Joseph Barbera
- Running time: 30–60 minutes
- Production companies: Hanna-Barbera Pty, Ltd. Air Programs International; Ruby-Spears Enterprises

Original release
- Network: CBS
- Release: November 1, 1970 – November 23, 1984

Related
- Family Classic Tales; ABC Afterschool Special; The ABC Saturday Superstar Movie

Famous Classic Tales is an animated anthology television series featuring animated adaptations of classic children's stories which aired on CBS from 1970 to 1984. The series was produced by the Australian division of Hanna-Barbera and Air Programs International (API), also from Australia, but the thirtieth installment was animated by Ruby-Spears Enterprises.

== Overview ==
Famous Classic Tales was broadcast on CBS and distributed by Kids Klassics Home Video and Storybook World. It had cartoons from Sydney-based API's Family Classic Tales. Featured cartoons included adaptions of classic literature such as Gulliver's Travels, Treasure Island, Black Beauty, Moby-Dick, and many others.

The creation of a series of animated features based on classic children's stories was conceived by Jack Thinnes, Media Director at Sive Advertising in Cincinnati, Ohio. The series was created for a Sive client, toy manufacturer Kenner Products, and each program was fully sponsored by Kenner on CBS Television Network on Sunday, late afternoon or early evening, during the prime toy selling season before Christmas. In 1983, the show was billed as Kenner Family Classics.

The idea to use classic children's books sprang from Thinnes' viewing of a two-minute demo of Dickens' A Christmas Carol, which was produced by Walter J. Hucker's studio, Air Programs International (API), of Sydney, Australia. API was acquired by Hanna-Barbera in 1972 after Thinnes introduced the owners of the studios to one another. After the series ran on CBS for nearly ten years, it was moved into local syndication by Sive's syndication department. However, their adaptation of A Christmas Carol was such a favorite that it continued to run on the network for fifteen years.

A similar series, Festival of Family Classics, was produced by Rankin/Bass and aired in syndication in 1972–1973.

== Episode list ==
Nº	Title	Airdate	Director(s)	Production	Synopsis
1	Tales of Washington Irving	November 1, 1970	Zoran Janjic	Air Programs International	
2	A Connecticut Yankee in King Arthur's Court	November 26, 1970	Zoran Janjic	Air Programs International	
3	A Christmas Carol	December 13, 1970	Zoran Janjic	Air Programs International	
4	The Legend of Robin Hood	November 14, 1971	Zoran Janjic	Air Programs International	
5	Treasure Island	November 28, 1971	Zoran Janjic	Air Programs International	
6	Travels of Marco Polo	January 1, 1972	Leif Gram	Air Programs International	
7	Robinson Crusoe	November 23, 1972	Leif Gram	Air Programs International	
8	The Prince and the Pauper	November 26, 1972	Chris Cuddington	Air Programs International	
9	The Count of Monte Cristo	September 23, 1973	William Hanna, Joseph Barbera	Hanna-Barbera Pty, Ltd.	A young sailor named Edmond Dantès gets falsey accused of treason by the royal prosecutor Gérard de Villefort. After escaping from Château d'If, Edmond discovers a treasure that makes him a wealthy nobleman under the alias of the Count of Monte Cristo as he plans revenge on those of framed him.
10	Kidnapped	October 22, 1973	Leif Gram	Air Programs International	
11	The Swiss Family Robinson	October 28, 1973	Leif Gram	Air Programs International	
12	Twenty Thousand Leagues Under the Seas	November 22, 1973	William Hanna, Joseph Barbera	Hanna-Barbera Pty, Ltd.	Captain Nemo meets a French scientist named Professor Arronax and a Canadian harpooner named Ned Land as he takes them onto his submarine called the Nautilus.
13	The Three Musketeers	November 23, 1973	William Hanna, Joseph Barbera	Hanna-Barbera Pty, Ltd.	d'Artagnan works with the Three Musketeers Athos, Porthos, and Aramis to foil the plans of Cardinal Richelieu.
14	The Black Arrow	December 2, 1973	Leif Gram	Air Programs International	
15	The Gentlemen of Titipu	January 15, 1974	Leif Gram	Air Programs International	
16	Moby-Dick	January 1, 1975	Richard Slapczynski	Air Programs International	
17	The Mysterious Island	November 15, 1975	Leif Gram	Air Programs International	
18	The Last of the Mohicans	November 27, 1975	Charles A. Nichols	Hanna-Barbera Pty, Ltd.	During the French and Indian War, a scout named Natty Bumpo (voiced by Mike Road) befriends the last chief of the Mohicans named Chingachgook (portrayed by John Doucette) and his fellow Mohican Uncas (voiced by Casey Kasem) while assisting in transporting Colonel Monro's daughters Alice (voiced by Kristina Holland) and Cora (voiced by Joan Van Ark), and Major Duncan Heyward (voiced by Paul Hecht) to Fort Henry where Monro (voiced by John Stephenson) is stationed.
19	Ivanhoe	November 27, 1975	Leif Gram	Air Programs International	
20	From the Earth to the Moon	January 1, 1976	Richard Slapczynski	Air Programs International	
21	Off on a Comet	January 1, 1976	Richard Slapczynski	Air Programs International	
22	Master of the World	October 23, 1976	Leif Gram	Air Programs International	
23	Davy Crockett on the Mississippi	November 20, 1976	Charles A. Nichols	Hanna-Barbera Pty, Ltd.	Davy Crockett (voiced by Ned Wilson) and his bear companion Honeysuckle (vocal effects provided by Michael Bell) meet a boy named Matt Henry (portrayed by Randy Gray). They get transported on the Mississippi River by Mike Fink (voiced by Ron Feinberg) as they encounter the Shawnee led by the chief' son Running Wolf (voiced by Kip Niven), a family of settlers (portrayed by Michael Bell and Patricia Parris), General Andrew Jackson (voiced by John Stephenson), and the river pirate Sloan (voiced by John Stephenson) and his sons Jake (voiced by Kip Niven) and Pete (voiced by Michael Bell).
24	A Journey to the Center of the Earth	November 13, 1977	Richard Slapczynski	Air Programs International	
25	Five Weeks in a Balloon	November 24, 1977	Chris Cuddington	Hanna-Barbera Pty, Ltd.	Dr. Samuel Ferguson, Joe, and Richard Kennedy travel across Africa in a hot air balloon.
26	Black Beauty	October 28, 1978	Chris Cuddington	Hanna-Barbera Pty, Ltd.	A black horse named Black Beauty (voiced by Alan Young) endures the many hardships in life.
27	Gulliver's Travels	November 18, 1979	Chris Cuddington	Hanna-Barbera Pty, Ltd.	A sailor named Gulliver (voiced by Ross Martin) ends up washed up on the island of Lilliput where he befriends a race of tiny people called Liliputians (voiced by Don Messick and Julie Bennett) and gets caught up in their war with Belfuscu. Then he arrives on Brobdingnag which is inhabited by giants (voiced by Julie Bennett, Regis Cordic, John Stephenson, and Janet Waldo).
28	The Adventures of Sinbad	November 23, 1979	Richard Slapczynski	Air Programs International	
29	Daniel Boone	November 27, 1981	Geoff Collins	Hanna-Barbera Pty, Ltd.	
30	Beauty and the Beast	November 25, 1983	Rudy Larriva	Ruby-Spears Enterprises	To save the life of her father (voiced by Stacy Keach Sr.), a young girl (voiced by Janet Waldo) agrees to live with a beast (voiced by Robert Ridgely) that lives in the castle he was staying the night in.
31	The Adventures of Huckleberry Finn	November 23, 1984	Paul McAdam	Air Programs International	

== Home video release ==
Several of the Famous Classic Tales specials were released on VHS by Worldvision Home Video, GoodTimes Entertainment, Fox Lorber, Hanna-Barbera Home Video and Turner Home Entertainment. Several other stories made it to DVD afterwards, including a 2007 release from Southern Star through Koch Vision titled Hanna-Barbera Storybook Favorites which featured The Last of the Mohicans, Black Beauty and Gulliver's Travels. All of these are now out of print.
