= Bōken Korobokkuru =

Japanese anime television series

- 冒険コロボックル
- Created by: Satoru Sato; Tsutomu Murakami
- Directed by: Yonehiko Watanabe (chief)
- Music by: Bob Sakuma
- Country of origin: Japan
- Original language: Japanese
- No. of episodes: 26

Production
- Producers: Toshitaka Ikegashira (Yomiuri TV); Yonehiko Watanabe
- Production companies: Yomiuri TV; Eiken

Original release
- Network: NNS (YTV, NTV)
- Release: October 6, 1973 – March 30, 1974

Bōken Korobokkuru (冒険コロボックル, also known as Adventures Of Korobokkle, Korobockle Adventures and The Mountain Gnomes) is a kodomo anime series.

It was an adaptation of the children's book Stories of Korobokkle by Satoru Sato, which was itself based on some northern Japan's folktales from Ainu people. It consisted of 26 episodes and was originally broadcast on Yomiuri TV.

According to Jonathan Clements and Helen McCarthy's The Anime Encyclopedia, it was "a foreshadowing of later Studio Ghibli efforts like Pompoko and My Neighbor Totoro."

== Cast ==
- Kei Tomiyama as Eji Sonta
- Noriko Ohara as Love Love
- Shinpei Sakamoto as Cous-Cous
- Satoshi Hasegawa as Seitaka (Ichiro Minegawa)
- Yasushi Suzuki as Bokkuru
