= 1972 in animation =

Events in 1972 in animation.

== Events ==
=== January ===
- January 13: The first episode of The Adventures of Sir Prancelot airs.
- January 24: The first episode of Loeki de Leeuw airs, a series of stop-motion shorts which serve as bumpers before and after commercial breaks on Dutch television. The shorts will continue until 31 December 2004.

=== February ===
- February 14:
  - The first episode of Fingerbobs airs.
  - The Lorax is first broadcast, based on Dr. Seuss' eponymous children's book.

=== April ===
- April 8: The first episode of The Most Important Person airs.
- April 10: 44th Academy Awards: The Crunch Bird by Ted Petok wins the Academy Award for Best Animated Short.
- April 12: Ralph Bakshi's debut film, Fritz the Cat, is first released, based on the eponymous comic strip by Robert Crumb. The picture is the first animated film to receive an X-rating and be strictly marketed for adults. It manages to become a surprise box office hit.

=== August ===
- August 9: Bill Melendez' second Peanuts animated feature film Snoopy Come Home is first released. It was also the last film released by Cinema Center Films, which was shut down due to financial loss. Woodstock makes his animated debut in this film.

=== September ===
- September 1: The final Woody Woodpecker animated short Bye, Bye, Blackboard is first released, after which Walter Lantz Productions closes down.
- September 9:
  - The first episode of Fat Albert and the Cosby Kids airs.
  - The first episode of Sealab 2020 airs, produced by Hanna-Barbera.
  - The first episode of The Osmonds airs, based on the popular pop group The Osmonds.
- September 12: Hanna-Barbera first broadcasts Wait Till Your Father Gets Home, an animated sitcom trying to target at a more adult audience. It later aired on Cartoon Network in the 1990s since it is considered more tame in today’s standards.
- September 14: Manuel García Ferré releases Anteojito y Antifaz, mil intentos y un invento.
- September 16: The first episode of Kid Power airs, based on the newspaper comic strip Wee Pals by Morrie Turner.

=== October ===
- October 1: The first episode of Science Ninja Team Gatchaman (also known as Battle of the Planets) airs.
- October 31: Ryan Larkin's Street Musique is first released.
- October 29: The Peanuts tv special You're Not Elected, Charlie Brown premieres on CBS.

=== November ===
- The first Annie Awards ceremony is held.

=== December ===
- December 3: The first episode of Mazinger Z airs.
- December 13: Belvision releases Tintin and the Lake of Sharks.
- December 14: Hal Sutherland's Journey Back to Oz premieres.
- December 21: Giuliano Cenci's The Adventures of Pinocchio premieres.
- Eric Porter's Marco Polo Junior Versus the Red Dragon is first released, the first Australian animated feature film.

=== Specific date unknown ===
- Edwin Catmull and Fred Parke create the earliest computer-animated film: A Computer Animated Hand.
- The first episode of The Wonderful Stories of Professor Kitzel airs.
- Břetislav Pojar's Balablok is first released.
- Nedeljko Dragić's Tup Tup is first released.
- Peter Lord and David Sproxton establish Aardman Animations.
- Sunrise is founded.

== Films released ==
- January 1 - Travels of Marco Polo (Australia)
- February 21 - The Enchanted World of Danny Kaye: The Emperor's New Clothes (United States, Denmark, and Japan)
- March 18 - The Three Musketeers in Boots (Japan)
- April 12 - Fritz the Cat (United States)
- June - The Amlash Enchanted Forest (Israel)
- June 21 - Superstar Goofy (United States)
- July 16 - Go Get Them 0011 (Japan)
- August 9 - Snoopy Come Home (United States)
- September 9 - The Brady Kids on Mysterious Island (United States)
- September 14 - Anteojito and Antifaz: A Thousand Attempts and One Invention (Argentina)
- September 16 - Yogi's Ark Lark (United States)
- September 23 - Mad Mad Mad Monsters (United States and Japan)
- September 30 - Nanny and the Professor (United States)
- October 4 - Last of the Curlews (United States)
- October 7 - Popeye Meets the Man Who Hated Laughter (United States)
- October 14 - Willie Mays and the Say-Hey Kid (United States)
- October 21–28 - Oliver and the Artful Dodger (United States)
- November 4 - The Adventures of Robin Hoodnik (United States)
- November 11 - Lassie and the Spirit of Thunder Mountain (United States)
- November 18 - Gidget Makes the Wrong Connection (United States)
- November 23 - Robinson Crusoe (Australia)
- November 25 - The Banana Splits in Hocus Pocus Park (United States)
- November 26 - The Prince and the Pauper (Australia)
- December - Marco Polo Junior Versus the Red Dragon (Australia)
- December 2 - Tabitha and Adam and the Clown Family (United States)
- December 9 - The Red Baron (United States)
- December 13 - Tintin and the Lake of Sharks (Belgium and France)
- December 14 - Journey Back to Oz (United States)
- December 16 - Daffy Duck and Porky Pig Meet the Groovie Goolies (United States)
- December 21 - The Adventures of Pinocchio (Italy)
- December 23 - The War of Great Monsters (South Korea)

== Television series ==
- January - Arago X-001 debuts on ORTF.
- January 6 - Calimero debuts on RAI and NET (now TV Asahi).
- January 9 - Shin Muumin debuts on Fuji TV.
- January 10 - Gekko Kamen debuts on Nippon TV.
- January 13 - The Adventures of Sir Prancelot debuts on BBC1.
- February 4 - Mokku of the Oak Tree debuts on Fuji TV.
- February 14 - Fingerbobs debuts on BBC1.
- April 1 - Triton of the Sea debuts on TV Asahi.
- April 3:
  - Mahō Tsukai Chappy debuts on NET (now TV Asahi).
  - The Most Important Person debuts on CBS.
- April 5 - Akado Suzunosuke debuts on Fuji TV.
- April 23 - Anime Document Munchen E No Michi debuts on TBS and Nippon TV.
- July 8 - Devilman debuts on NET (now TV Asahi).
- August 27 - Mon Chéri CoCo debuts on TBS.
- September 9:
  - The ABC Saturday Superstar Movie, The Osmonds, and The Brady Kids debut on ABC.
  - Josie and the Pussycats in Outer Space, The Amazing Chan and the Chan Clan, The Flintstone Comedy Hour, and The New Scooby-Doo Movies debut on CBS.
  - Sealab 2020, The Roman Holidays, The Barkleys, and The Houndcats debut on NBC.
  - Fat Albert and the Cosby Kids debuts on CBS and in syndication.
- September 10 - Festival of Family Classics debuts in syndication.
- September 12 - Wait Till Your Father Gets Home debuts on NBC.
- September 16 - Kid Power debuts on ABC.
- October 1 - Science Ninja Team Gatchaman debuts on Fuji TV.
- October 4 - Astroganger debuts on NNS (NTV).
- October 5 - Hazedon and Kaiketsu Tamagon debut on Fuji TV.
- October 7 - Dokonjo Gaeru debuts on TBS.
- November 11 - Lassie's Rescue Rangers debuts on ABC.
- December 3 - Mazinger Z debuts on Fuji TV.
- December 23 - Frakk, a macskák réme debuts on Magyar Televízió.
- Specific date unknown - The Wonderful Stories of Professor Kitzel debuts in syndication.

== Births ==
=== January ===
- January 1: Howard Margulies, American television writer (Duckman, Sabrina: The Animated Series, Squirrel Boy).
- January 2:
  - Adam Elliot, Australian stop-motion animation writer, director and producer (Harvie Krumpet, Mary and Max, Memoir of a Snail).
  - Christopher Lennertz, American composer (Alvin and the Chipmunks, Coyote Falls, Hop, Sausage Party, Smurfs: The Lost Village, UglyDolls, Tom & Jerry, The Loud House Movie).
- January 10: Alessandro Pepe, Italian FX artist (DreamWorks Animation).
- January 11:
  - Christian Jacobs, American actor and musician (voice of Cavin in season 1 of Adventures of the Gummi Bears, co-creator of and voice of Plex in Yo Gabba Gabba!).
  - Amanda Peet, American actress (voice of Maria Montez in Battle for Terra, Ranger in Quantum Quest: A Cassini Space Odyssey).
- January 13: Yukiko Iwai, Japanese voice actress (voice of Ayumi Yoshida in Detective Conan).
- January 22: Romi Park, Korean-Japanese actress (voice of Edward Elric in Fullmetal Alchemist, Tōshirō Hitsugaya in Bleach, the title character in Nana, Ken Ichijouji in Digimon Adventure 02, Temari in Naruto, Hange Zoë in Attack on Titan, Loran Cehack in Turn A Gundam, Syrup in Yes! PreCure 5 GoGo, Raygo Kiryuin in Kill La Kill, Zoroark in Pokémon: Zoroark: Master of Illusions, Lui Shirasagijo in Beyblade Burst).
- January 28: Bettina Bush, American actress (voice of Megan in My Little Pony, the title character in Rainbow Brite, Lucy Little in The Littles, Kai Green in the Ben 10 franchise, Elena in Final Fantasy VII: Advent Children, Alisa Charmichael in the Rugrats franchise).
- January 30: Jennifer Hale, Canadian-American actress (voice of Ivy in Where on Earth is Carmen Sandiego?, Felicia Hardy/Black Cat in Spider-Man, Jessie Bannon in season 2 of The Real Adventures of Jonny Quest, Princess Morbucks, Ms. Keane, and Sedusa in The Powerpuff Girls, Thorn in Scooby-Doo, Mary Jane Watson in Spider-Man Unlimited, Sam and Mandy in Totally Spies, Numbuh 86 in Codename: Kids Next Door, Giganta in Justice League and Justice League Unlimited, Kyoshi in Avatar: The Last Airbender and The Legend of Korra, Aayla Secura in Star Wars: The Clone Wars, Jean Grey in Wolverine and the X-Men and X-Men '97, Zatanna, Poison Ivy, and Killer Frost in Batman: The Brave and the Bold, Captain Marvel in The Avengers: Earth's Mightiest Heroes, Rojo in Ben 10: Omniverse, continued voice of Aurora and Cinderella).

=== February ===
- February 5: Kristopher Carter, American composer (Warner Bros. Animation, The Spectacular Spider-Man, Avengers Assemble, Wacky Races).
- February 8:
  - Hiroshi Tsuchida, Japanese voice actor (voice of Raido Namiashi in Naruto, Friedrich von Purgstail in Guyver: The Bioboosted Armor, Shogo Muramasa in Tokko, Kazushi Yamazaki in Honey and Clover, Akamashi in Murder Princess, Yang in D.Gray-man, John Titor in Steins;Gate, Ezel in Fairy Tail, Grisha Yeager in Attack on Titan, Japanese dub voice of Malik in Space Jam: A New Legacy, Lightning McQueen in the Cars franchise, Gwi-Ma in KPop Demon Hunters, Dr. Nefario in Minions: The Rise of Gru, Donatello in Teenage Mutant Ninja Turtles), (d. 2026).
  - Paul Wight, American pro wrestler (voiced himself in The Jetsons & WWE: Robo-WrestleMania!, Palindrome in Fast & Furious Spy Racers and Ham Hand in No Time to Spy).
- February 9: Crispin Freeman, American actor and voice director (voice of Alucard in Hellsing, Itachi Uchiha in Naruto, Holland Novak in Eureka Seven, Togusa in Ghost in the Shell, Zelgadis Greywords in Slayers, Hagi in Blood+, Jeremiah Gottwald in Code Geass, Shizuo Heiwajima in Durarara!!, Ant-Man in The Avengers: Earth's Mightiest Heroes, Speedy and Captain Boomerang in Young Justice, Electro in The Spectacular Spider-Man, Martian Manhunter in Justice League Action, Mysterio in Spider-Man, Doug Maheswaran in Steven Universe).
- February 14: Rob Thomas, American musician (performed "Little Wonders" in Meet the Robinsons).
- February 22: Chris Sonnenburg, American animator (The Swan Princess, The Critic, Walt Disney Animation Studios, Futurama, Free for All, Kung Fu Panda), storyboard artist (Sit Down, Shut Up, Futurama, Beavis and Butt-Head, Kick Buttowski: Suburban Daredevil, Gravity Falls, The LeBrons, Free Birds, Planes: Fire & Rescue), writer, director and producer (Rapunzel's Tangled Adventure).
- February 26: Keith Ferguson, American voice actor (voice of Bloo in Foster's Home For Imaginary Friends, Lord Hater in Wander Over Yonder, Papa G in Kid Cosmic, Flintheart Glomgold, Megavolt, and Liquidator in DuckTales, Batman and Robin in DC Super Hero Girls, Thunderbolt Ross in The Avengers: Earth's Mightiest Heroes, Wile E. Coyote in Bugs Bunny Builders, Deputy Durland in Gravity Falls, Friend Owl in Bambi II, Karate Kid and Nemesis Kid in the Legion of Super Heroes episode "The Karate Kid").
- February 27: Tifanie Christun, American former voice actress (voice of Biyomon, Yolei Inoue and Riley Otori in the Digimon franchise).

=== March ===
- March 6: Shaquille O'Neal, American former professional basketball player (voice of 90's Adventure Bear in season 1 of Pickle and Peanut, Smooth Smurf in The Smurfs 2, himself in the Static Shock episode "Static Shaq", The Simpsons episode "Gone Boy", the Johnny Bravo episode "Back on Shaq", The Cleveland Show episode "A Short Story and a Tall Tale", the Uncle Grandpa episode "The Perfect Kid", and The Lego Movie).
- March 10: Celeste Mari Williams, American production assistant (The Twisted Tales of Felix the Cat, King of the Hill) and sheet timer (King of the Hill, The Simpsons, Dilbert, Family Guy, Futurama, What a Cartoon!, 3-South, American Dad!).
- March 12: Larry Murphy, American actor and comedian (voice of Teddy in Bob's Burgers, Amazing Rope Guy in WordGirl, the title character in Assy McGee).
- March 18: Dane Cook, American comedian and actor (voice of Dusty Crophopper in Planes, and Planes: Fire & Rescue, Van Chancy in the Duck Dodgers episode "Win, Lose or Duck", Harriet's Boss, Braveheart Mouse and Dave Seville in the Robot Chicken episode "3 2 1 2 333, 222, 3...66?").
- March 20: Jonathan Lipow, American voice actor (voice of Mikuni in Duel Masters, Fire Leo in Viewtiful Joe, Bob Barker, Isaac Newton, Woody, and Darkwing Duck in Robot Chicken, Valentine, The Tikis and Crash Maxxon in Monster High, Starlian in Barbie: Star Light Adventure, Glitch and Al in Star Wars Resistance, Unicron in Transformers: War for Cybertron Trilogy, Jack Osbourne in the Celebrity Deathmatch episode "Sibling Slaughterhouse", Alpha Wolf in the We Bare Bears episode "Brother Up", Ordo Moon Dragon in the Star Wars: The Bad Batch episode "Replacements", B-20N and T-Imperial Crew in the Star Wars: Visions episode "The Twins", additional voices in Castlevania).
- March 21: Kristen Anderson-Lopez, American songwriter and lyricist (Frozen, Coco, Winnie the Pooh, Wonder Pets, voice of Kanga in Winnie the Pooh).
- March 24: Tony Leondis, Greek-American animator, filmmaker, and actor (The Emoji Movie, Lilo & Stitch 2: Stitch Has a Glitch, Igor).
- March 26: Leslie Mann, American actress (voice of Amphitrite in Hercules, Linda Gunderson in Rio and Rio 2, Gina Winthrop in Allen Gregory, Sandra Babcock in ParaNorman, Patty Peterson in Mr. Peabody & Sherman, Hope Betterman in The Croods: A New Age, herself in The Simpsons episode "Steal This Episode").
- March 27: Emily Kapnek, American television producer and writer (Hercules, Klasky Csupo, creator of As Told by Ginger).
- March 28: Nick Frost, English actor (voice of Flynn in Ice Age: Continental Drift, Mr. Trout in The Boxtrolls, Stuart in 3Below: Tales of Arcadia, Merlin in Scooby-Doo! The Sword and the Scoob).
- March 29: Christopher Hink, American production assistant (Rugrats, The Ren & Stimpy Show), prop designer (SpongeBob SquarePants) and film editor (Nickelodeon Animation Studio, Stripperella).

=== April ===
- April 1: Matt Silverstein, American television writer (Drawn Together, Golan the Insatiable, 3-South, Axe Cop, The Goode Family, The Cleveland Show, DJ & the Fro).
- April 3: Jennie Garth, American actress (voice of Kelly Taylor in Stewie Griffin: The Untold Story, Angel Revson in the Biker Mice from Mars episode "Hit the Road, Jack", Trudy Lawrence in the American Dad! episode "Roger n' Me", Carol Brady in the Robot Chicken episode "Secret of the Flushed Footlong").
- April 5:
  - Yasuhiro Takemoto, Japanese director (The Disappearance of Haruhi Suzumiya, Hyouka) and member of Kyoto Animation, (d. 2019) in the Kyoto Animation arson attack.
  - Junko Takeuchi, Japanese actress (voice of the title character in the Naruto franchise, Rin Natsuki / Cure Rouge in Yes! PreCure 5, Takuya Kanbara in Digimon Frontier, Gon Freecss in Hunter × Hunter), Kuromi in Onegai My Melody.
- April 15: Lou Romano, American animator (Pixar, The Pagemaster, Cats Don't Dance, Monkeybone, The Boxtrolls, Kubo and the Two Strings, Samurai Jack, The Lego Movie 2: The Second Part), storyboard artist (Dexter's Laboratory, The Powerpuff Girls), character designer (The Iron Giant), art director (Wonder Park) and actor (voice of the Amoeba Boys in Whoopass Stew!, Bernie Kropp in The Incredibles, Snotrod in Cars, Linguini in Ratatouille).
- April 17: Jennifer Garner, American actress (voice of Mom in Wonder Park, Mama Llama in Llama Llama, Jennifer in the Martha Speaks episode "Too Many Marthas", herself in The Simpsons episode "Treehouse of Horror XIV").
- April 18:
  - Brian Kelley, American television producer and writer (Futurama, Clerks: The Animated Series, The Simpsons).
  - David Slack, American television producer and writer (Adelaide Productions, The Legend of Tarzan, What's with Andy?, Warner Bros. Animation, Totally Spies!, Hi Hi Puffy AmiYumi, Storm Hawks, Pink Panther and Pals, Transformers: Prime, Generator Rex, Gravity Falls, Thunderbirds Are Go, The Dark Crystal: Age of Resistance).
- April 20: Carmen Electra, American actress (voice of Six in Tripping the Rift, Angela in the King of the Hill episode "Boxing Luanne", Lisa Silver in the American Dad! episode "Escape from Pearl Bailey", herself in The Simpsons episode "The Frying Game").
- April 22: Laura McCreary, American television producer and writer (Disney Television Animation, Angela Anaconda, As Told by Ginger, American Dad!, Higglytown Heroes, The Secret Saturdays, LoliRock).
- April 26: Aubrey Ankrum, American screenwriter, animator and graphic artist (co-creator and voice of Pop and Flippy/Fliqpy in Happy Tree Friends).
- April 27: Wellesley Wild, American voice actor, screenwriter and producer (Family Guy, Animaniacs).
- April 29: Roman Dirge, American comic book writer, artist and former magician (Invader Zim, creator of Lenore, the Cute Little Dead Girl).

=== May ===
- May 2: Dwayne Johnson, American actor, businessman, and former professional wrestler (voice of Maui in the Moana franchise, and Once Upon a Studio, Krypto and Black Adam in DC League of Super-Pets, Captain Charles T. Baker in Planet 51, Cliffjumper in the first episode of Transformers: Prime).
- May 4: Davy Lauterbach, American poet, painter, animator and color stylist (The Simpsons).
- May 7: Jennifer Yuh Nelson, American story artist, characters designer, illustrator, and director (Kung Fu Panda 2, Kung Fu Panda 3, Love, Death & Robots).
- May 8: Brian Tyler, American conductor, producer, arranger and composer (Bee Movie, Transformers: Prime, Teenage Mutant Ninja Turtles, Chip 'n Dale: Rescue Rangers, The Super Mario Bros. Movie, composed the 2012 Universal Pictures fanfare).
- May 15: Bud'da, American hip hop producer, rapper, songwriter and composer (Da Boom Crew, The Proud Family).
- May 16: Khary Payton, American actor (voice of Cyborg in Teen Titans, Teen Titans Go!, DC Super Hero Girls, and Justice League Action, Hex and Manny Armstrong in the Ben 10 franchise, Aqualad, Black Manta, Black Lightning, and Robotman in Young Justice, Rafiki in The Lion Guard, Wasabi in Big Hero 6: The Series, Maurice in Codename: Kids Next Door, Penguin King in The Super Mario Bros. Movie).
- May 20: Busta Rhymes, American rapper and actor (voice of Reptar Wagon in Rugrats, Flonominal in The Boondocks, Fish in the Big City Greens episode "Fill Bill").
- May 22: Max Brooks, American actor and author (voice of Howard Groote in Batman Beyond, Lieutenant Bernstein in the Roughnecks: Starship Troopers Chronicles episode "Swarm").

=== June ===
- June 1: Rick Gomez, American actor (voice of Sniz in Sniz and Fondue, Bud in Gary the Rat, Pilot in The Animatrix, Lead Merc in The Chronicles of Riddick: Dark Fury, Slips Python, Windsor Gorilla and James Ant in My Gym Partner's a Monkey, Zack Fair in Compilation of Final Fantasy VII, The Priest and Fireman in The Life & Times of Tim, Loki in Thor: Tales of Asgard).
- June 2:
  - Wayne Brady, American actor, television personality and singer (voice of Clover in Sofia the First, Harold McBride in The Loud House, King Dice in The Cuphead Show!, Shackelford in Clifford's Really Big Movie, Brick Pimiento in Scooby-Doo! Stage Fright, Blue in The Hero of Color City, Cameron in Shorty McShorts' Shorts, performed the theme song of The Weekenders).
  - Wentworth Miller, English actor and screenwriter (voice of Deathstroke in the Young Justice episode "The Fix", Jock #4 and Popular Kid #2 in the Family Guy episode "Stew-Roids").
- June 4: Josh Lieb, American television producer and writer (The Simpsons, Drawn Together, Immigrants).
- June 7: Karl Urban, New Zealand actor (voice of Jacob Holland in The Sea Beast, Sgt. Rock in DC Showcase: Sgt. Rock).
- June 14: Aliki Theofilopoulos, Greek-American animator, storyboard artist (ChalkZone, Random! Cartoons, Disney Television Animation), writer (Phineas and Ferb, Mickey Mouse), director and producer (Descendants: Wicked World, Harvey Girls Forever!, Doug Unplugs).
- June 16: John Cho, Korean-American actor (voice of Long in Wish Dragon, Vince Chung in American Dad!, Isonokami in The Tale of the Princess Kaguya, Thomas Kim in the Static Shock episode "Tantrum", Hirotaka in the Kim Possible episode "Exchange").
- June 17: C. H. Greenblatt, American animator, storyboard artist (SpongeBob SquarePants, Free for All, The Grim Adventures of Billy & Mandy, Evil Con Carne, The X's), voice actor, director, writer (The Grim Adventures of Billy & Mandy, Evil Con Carne, Fish Hooks) and producer (creator of Chowder, Harvey Beaks and Jellystone!).
- June 19: Joel Trussell, American television producer, director and animator (Captain Fall, Pickle and Peanut, Electric City).
- June 23: Warren Graff, American writer and voice actor (voice of Toothy and Handy in Happy Tree Friends).

=== July ===
- July 1: Steve Little, American actor, writer and comedian (Cartoon Network Studios, Mike Tyson Mysteries, voice of Spider with a Top Hat in Star vs. the Forces of Evil).
- July 10:
  - Peter Serafinowicz, English actor (voice of Big Daddy in Sing and Sing 2, Neil in Aqua Teen Forever: Plantasm, Blind Ivan in the Gravity Falls episode "Society of the Blind Eye", Lumpy Space Prince in the Adventure Time episode "The Prince Who Wanted Everything", the title character in The Adventures of OG Sherlock Kush, the Phantom Stranger in DC Showcase: The Phantom Stranger, Garthan Saal in the What If...? episode "What If Nebula Joined the Nova Corps", Darth Chef in the South Park episode "The Return of Chef").
  - Sofía Vergara, Colombian-American actress (voice of Carmen in Happy Feet Two, Gabby Babblebrook in Escape from Planet Earth, Senora Chalupa in The Cleveland Show episode "The Essence of Cleveland", Carol Berrera in The Simpsons episode "Teenage Mutant Milk-Caused Hurdles").
  - John Viener, American actor, (voice of Norm in Phineas and Ferb), comedian, writer and producer (Family Guy).
- July 11: Michael Rosenbaum, American actor (voice of Wally West in the DC Animated Universe and Teen Titans, Agent West in The Zeta Project, Deadman in the Batman: The Brave and the Bold episode "Dawn of the Dead Man!", Westley in the Robot Chicken episode "Musya Shakhtyorov in: Honeyboogers").
- July 14: Deborah Mailman, Australian actress, singer (voice of Betty Bill in Blinky Bill the Movie, Maggie Diggins in the Tales from Sanctuary City's Combat Wombat and Combat Wombat: Back 2 Back).
- July 23: Marlon Wayans, American actor, comedian, writer and producer (voice of Blue in Waynehead, Bad Bobby in the Happily Ever After: Fairy Tales for Every Child episode "The Bremen Town Musicians", Ry Ry in the Animals episode "Squirrels").
- July 24: Matt Engstrom, American animator (Mortal Kombat: The Journey Begins), storyboard artist (King of the Hill, Nickelodeon Animation Studio, DreamWorks Animation Television, Ferdinand), sheet timer (Ni Hao, Kai-Lan), director (King of the Hill, Nickelodeon Animation Studio, The Grim Adventures of Billy & Mandy, The Cleveland Show, All Hail King Julien, The Boss Baby: Back in Business) and producer (The Boss Baby: Back in Business, The Boss Baby: Back in the Crib).
- July 27: Maya Rudolph, American comedian, actress, and singer (voice of Rapunzel in Shrek the Third, Burn in Turbo, Precious in The Nut Job and The Nut Job 2: Nutty by Nature, Aunt Cass in the Big Hero 6 franchise, Matilda and Poppy in The Angry Birds Movie and The Angry Birds Movie 2, Verti in My Entire High School Sinking into the Sea, Smiler in The Emoji Movie, Nanny in The Willoughbys, Linda Mitchell in The Mitchells vs. the Machines, Daniela Paguro in Luca, Lady Malocchio in The Awesomes, Diane Birch and Connie in Big Mouth, Betty Hart and Norma in Bless the Harts, Julia in The Simpsons episode "The Homer of Seville", Cherry in The Mighty B! episode "The Dragonflies", JoAnne Shalit in the Family Guy episode "The Book of Joe").
- July 29: Wil Wheaton, American actor (voice of Martin Brisby in The Secret of NIMH, Aqualad in Teen Titans and Teen Titans Go!, Michael Morningstar / Darkstar in the Ben 10 franchise, Cosmic Boy in Legion of Super Heroes, Ted Kord / Blue Beetle in Batman: The Brave and the Bold, Perceptor in Transformers: Titans Return, Commander S'Leet in Miles from Tomorrowland, Wesley Crusher in the Star Trek: Lower Decks episode "Old Friends, New Planets", himself in the Family Guy episode "Not All Dogs Go to Heaven").
- July 30: GloZell, American YouTube personality (voice of Grandma Rosiepuff in Trolls, Little Debbie in Ralph Breaks the Internet).
- July 31: Joseph Motiki, Canadian television host, actor, and performer (voice of Rocky Canyon in Rescue Heroes, Ryan in Total Drama Presents: The Ridonculous Race, Pedro in Hotel Transylvania: The Series, Oscar in Top Wing, Otis Goodway in PAW Patrol).

=== August ===
- August 3: Sumalee Montano, American actress (voice of Arcee in Transformers: Prime, Katana in Beware the Batman, Fluffy in Bunnicula, Maria Santiago in The Loud House and The Casagrandes, Admiral Sanda in Voltron: Legendary Defender, Yuri Watanabe in Spider-Man, Agent Tierny in Star Wars Resistance, Sharon McGee in The Ghost and Molly McGee, Emerald Empress in Justice League vs. the Fatal Five).
- August 10:
  - Derrick J. Wyatt, American character designer (Warner Bros. Animation, Cartoon Network Studios, Bless the Harts) and storyboard artist (The Ripping Friends), (d. 2021).
  - Angie Harmon, American actress (voice of Lady Trigel in Voltron: Legendary Defender, second voice of Barbara Gordon in Batman Beyond).
- August 12: Clint Eland, Canadian animation producer (founder of Mercury Filmworks).
- August 13: Michael Sinterniklaas, French actor (voice of Taki Tachibana in Your Name, Mikey Simon in Kappa Mikey, Nathaniel Kurtzberg in Miraculous: Tales of Ladybug & Cat Noir, Leonardo in Teenage Mutant Ninja Turtles, Nnoitora Gilga in Bleach, Dean Venture in The Venture Bros.).
- August 15:
  - Ben Affleck, American actor and filmmaker (voice of Joseph in Joseph: King of Dreams).
  - Matthew Wood, American sound editor (Titan A.E., WALL-E), and voice actor (voice of General Grievous in the Star Wars franchise).
- August 24: Maureen Mlynarczyk, American animation timer (Film Roman, Warner Bros. Animation, Disney Television Animation, Cartoon Network Studios, Rough Draft Studios), (d. 2020).
- August 30:
  - Stephen Silver, British artist, cartoonist, and character designer (Clerks: The Animated Series, The Fairly OddParents, Kim Possible, Danny Phantom, The Penguins of Madagascar, Scooby-Doo! Mystery Incorporated, Johnny Test).
  - Cameron Diaz, American actress (voice of Fiona in the Shrek franchise).

=== September ===
- September 6:
  - Anika Noni Rose, American actress and singer (voice of Tiana in The Princess and the Frog, Sofia the First, Ralph Breaks the Internet, Lego Disney Princess: The Castle Quest, Lego Disney Princess: Villains Unite, and Once Upon a Studio, Acxa in Voltron: Legendary Defender, Nut in Magical Girl Friendship Squad: Origins, Dr. Jan in Amphibia, Selina Kyle/Catwoman in Injustice, Yemandi in the Avengers Assemble episode of the same name, Rita LaFleur in The Simpsons episode "Gone Abie Gone").
  - Idris Elba, English actor, producer and musician (voice of Chief Bogo in the Zootopia franchise, Shere Khan in The Jungle Book, Fluke in Finding Dory, Knuckles in Sonic the Hedgehog 2, Police Officer in the Aqua Teen Hunger Force episode "Intervention").
- September 8: Tomokazu Seki, Japanese voice actor (voice of Toji Suzuhara in Neon Genesis Evangelion, Tracey Sketchit in Pokémon, Whisper in Yo-Kai Watch, Mepple in Futari wa Pretty Cure, Kanji Tatsumi in Persona 4: The Animation, Suneo in the Doraemon franchise, Rob Lucci in One Piece; Japanese dub voice of Agustín Madrigal in Encanto, Ron in Ron's Gone Wrong, and King Trollex in Trolls World Tour).
- September 9: Goran Višnjić, Croatian-American actor (voice of Soto in Ice Age).
- September 10: Dan Milano, American voice actor (voice of various characters in Robot Chicken, Mad and Glitch Techs, Willie Palmer and President Keith Caylo in Titan Maximum, Grug, Womp, Dainty, Loo, Mr. Nork and Weez in Dawn of the Croods), puppeteer, director, television producer and writer (Robot Chicken, Sonic Boom, All Hail King Julien, Dawn of the Croods, co-creator of Greg the Bunny and Glitch Techs).
- September 11: Étienne Willem, Belgian comic book artist and storyboard artist (Trollz, Liberty's Kids, DinoSquad, Strawberry Shortcake, Tara Duncan, Horseland, The Breadwinner), (d. 2024).
- September 12: Gideon Emery, English actor (voice of Weasel in Rapunzel's Tangled Adventure, Teeny in How to Train Your Dragon 2, Copperhead in Suicide Squad: Hell to Pay, Trapper in How to Train Your Dragon: The Hidden World, Moon Knight in the Avengers Assemble episode "Beyond").
- September 14: Nakamura Shidō II, Japanese actor (voice of Ryuk in Death Note).
- September 15: John Schwab, American actor, writer, director and producer (voice of Voice Trumpet in Teletubbies, Stanley, Vinnie, and the Mainland Diesels in Thomas & Friends, Jack Sheffield in Zorro Generation Z)
- September 21: Erin Fitzgerald, Canadian voice actress (voice of Rose Lavillant and Juleka Couffaine in season 1 of Miraculous: Tales of Ladybug & Cat Noir, Nazz and May Kanker in Ed, Edd n Eddy, C.A. Cupid in the Monster High franchise, Eudial in the Viz Media dub of Sailor Moon).
- September 22: Nicolas Beaucaire, French actor (French dub voice of Saotome in Colorful, Kesha in Space Dogs: Adventure to the Moon, Syaoran in Tsubasa: Reservoir Chronicle, Yukio "Koyuki" Tanaka in Beck, Tim in Devil May Cry: The Animated Series, Shito Tachibana in Zombie-Loan, Jiro in Blue Dragon, Ginji in Victory Kickoff!!, Ordo in Four Knights of the Apocalypse), (d. 2025).
- September 23: Karl Pilkington, English presenter, comedian, actor, producer and author (co-creator and co-host of The Ricky Gervais Show).

=== October ===
- October 8: Nina Bargiel, American television writer (Disney Television Animation, The Grim Adventures of Billy & Mandy, Dorothy and the Wizard of Oz, Littlest Pet Shop: A World of Our Own, Barbie Dreamhouse Adventures, Mao Mao: Heroes of Pure Heart, Angry Birds: Summer Madness).
- October 11: Claudia Black, Australian actress (voice of Cheetah in Justice League: Doom, Sheryl Godspeed in Final Space).
- October 18: Christopher Knights, English animator (We're Back! A Dinosaur's Story), camera operator (Balto, The Prince of Egypt), film editor (DreamWorks Animation), cinematographer and voice actor (voice of Blind Mice and Thelonius in the Shrek franchise, Private in the Madagascar franchise, Fat Barry and Market Trader in Flushed Away, Prison Guard in Megamind, King Gorge's Coach in Rumble).
- October 19: Sayaka Aoki, Japanese voice actress (voice of Cream the Rabbit in Sonic X).
- October 21: Masakazu Morita, Japanese actor and singer (voice of Ichigo Kurosaki in Bleach, Maeda Keiji in Sengoku Basara, Marco in One Piece, Li Xin in Kingdom, Whis in Dragon Ball Super).
- October 26: Kevin Munroe, Canadian filmmaker and animator (Hey Arnold!, The Ant Bully, TMNT, Strange Magic, Ratchet & Clank, My Little Pony: The Movie).
- October 28: Lee Supercinski, American television producer (Futurama, Game Over, How Murray Saved Christmas, Disenchantment).
- October 29: Gabrielle Union, American actress (voice of Meridian Clade in Strange World, Nala in The Lion Guard).
- October 31: Vernon Chatman, American television producer, writer (South Park, Xavier: Renegade Angel, Neon Knome, China, IL, The Shivering Truth), and voice actor (voice of the title character in Xavier: Renegade Angel, Towelie in South Park).

=== November ===
- November 1:
  - Sean Roberge, Canadian actor (voice of Chester McTech in Beverly Hills Teens, Tuxedo Sam in Hello Kitty's Furry Tale Theater, additional voices in Babar), (d. 1996).
  - Toni Collette, Australian actress, producer, singer, and songwriter (voice of Princess Yum-Yum's Nurse and the Mad and Holy Witch in Arabian Knight, Meg Bluegum in The Magic Pudding, Mary Daisy Dinkle in Mary and Max, Lady Portley-Rind in The Boxtrolls, Beryl and Cheryl in Blinky Bill: The Movie, Agatha Gillman in Ruby Gillman, Teenage Kraken).
  - Zairaini Sarbini, Malaysian actress (dub voice of Candace Flynn in Phineas and Ferb, Sam in Totally Spies, Conan Edogawa in Case Closed, Sakura Haruno and Hinata Hyuga in Naruto, Katara in Avatar: The Last Airbender, and Sandy Cheeks in SpongeBob SquarePants), (d. 2021).
  - Jenny McCarthy, American actress (voice of Six in Tripping the Rift, Shelly in A Turtle's Tale: Sammy's Adventures, Marcy in the What's New, Scooby-Doo? episode "A Scooby Doo Halloween").
- November 4: Wendy Hoopes, American actress (voice of Jane Lane, Helen Morgendorffer, and Quinn Morgendorffer in Daria).
- November 6:
  - Rebecca Romijn, American actress and former model (voice of the Empress in Adventure Time, Lois Lane in the DC Animated Movie Universe, Charlotte in the Drawn Together episode "Charlotte's Web of Lies", Miss Garcia in the Special Agent Oso episode "A View to the Truth", Speaker and Graduate in The Cleveland Show episode "Back to Cool").
  - Thandiwe Newton, English actress (voice of Mona in Big Mouth and Human Resources, Ginger in Chicken Run: Dawn of the Nugget, Makeva in the American Dad! episode "Camp Refoogee").
- November 7: Christopher Daniel Barnes, American actor (voice of Prince Eric in The Little Mermaid, Prince Charming in Cinderella II and Cinderella III: A Twist in Time, Spider-Man in Spider-Man, Electro, Spyder-Knight, and Wolf Spider in Ultimate Spider-Man, Stripes in the Sonic Underground episode "The Last Resort", Taggert McStone in the Jackie Chan Adventures episode "Agent Tag", additional voices in Captain Planet and the Planeteers).
- November 9: Eric Dane, American actor (voiced himself in the Family Guy episode "Veteran Guy"), (d. 2026).
- November 10: Trevor Devall, Canadian voice actor and podcaster (voice of Dukey in Johnny Test, Rocket Raccoon in Guardians of the Galaxy, Avengers Assemble, and Ultimate Spider-Man, Hades and Apollo in Class of the Titans, Loki in Marvel Future Avengers, Jonah Hex and Cain in Justice League Action).
- November 13: Takuya Kimura, Japanese actor, singer and radio personality (voice of Howl Pendragon in Howl's Moving Castle, JP in Redline, Jill in Doraemon: Nobita's New Dinosaur, himself in the Sazae-san episode "Recipe for a Smile").
- November 14: Josh Duhamel, American actor (voice of Captain Flynn in Jake and the Never Land Pirates, Two-Face in Batman: The Long Halloween, Oz in Fanboy & Chum Chum, Marlowe in Blade Runner: Black Lotus).
- November 15: Joe Vaux, American animator, storyboard artist (Adelaide Productions, Tutenstein, LeapFrog, Family Guy), background artist (What a Cartoon!, Spicy City, Van Helsing: The London Assignment), writer and director (Dilbert, Family Guy).
- November 18: Luther McLaurin, American animator (Attack of the Killer Tomatoes), storyboard artist (Klasky Csupo, Warner Bros. Animation, Nickelodeon Animation Studio, Bionicle 2: Legends of Metru Nui, 3-2-1 Penguins!, Growing Up Creepie, Adventure Time, Hoodwinked Too! Hood vs. Evil, Postman Pat: The Movie, Ultimate Spider-Man, Smallfoot, Kung Fu Panda: The Paws of Destiny, Luck), character designer (Catscratch), writer (Adventure Time) and director (Kung Fu Panda: Legends of Awesomeness, The Adventures of Puss in Boots, Glitch Techs).
- November 22: Gabe Khouth, Canadian actor (voice of Nicol Amalfi in Gundam SEED, Goten in the Ocean dub of Dragon Ball Z, Orko and Mekaneck in He-Man and the Masters of the Universe, Spinner Cortez in Hot Wheels Battle Force 5), (d. 2019).
- November 29: Brian Baumgartner, American actor (voice of Klonk in Rumble, Hotu Mat'u in The Mr. Peabody & Sherman Show episode "Hotu Mat'u", Storm Cloud in the Summer Camp Island episode "Cosmic Bupkiss").

=== December ===
- December 4: Yūko Miyamura, Japanese actress, singer and sound director (voice of Kazuha Toyama in Detective Conan, Casca in Berserk, Asuka Langley Soryu in Neon Genesis Evangelion).
- December 7: Kimberly Hébert Gregory, American actress (voice of Nicole Williams in Craig of the Creek, Fuller in No Activity), (d. 2025).
- December 18: Jason Mantzoukas, American actor (voice of Jay Bilzerian in Big Mouth, Alex Dorpenberger in Close Enough, Jankom Pog in Star Trek: Prodigy, Mr. Ross in Regular Show: The Movie, Scarecrow in The Lego Batman Movie, Samuel Adams in America: The Motion Picture, Dragos in Comrade Detective, Carl Sando in Rise of the Teenage Mutant Ninja Turtles, Steelbeak in DuckTales, Rex Splode in Invincible, the Gray One in HouseBroken, Pine Booby in the Squidbillies episode "Flight of the Deep Fried Pine Booby", Mr. Manoogian in the Bob's Burgers episode "The Unnatural", Fink in the Animals episode "Rats.", Vanbo in the Solar Opposites episode "Retrace-Your-Step-Alizer", the Emptier in the Magical Girl Friendship Squad episode "Just Two Weak Girls", Jughead Jones in the Robot Chicken episode "The Bleepin' Robot Chicken Archie Comics Special", Huster McBackstabber in The Wonderful World of Mickey Mouse episode "Duet for Two").
- December 19: Alyssa Milano, American actress (voice of Angel in Lady and the Tramp II: Scamp's Adventure, Aimee Brenner in DC Showcase: The Spectre, April in The Adventures of Jimmy Neutron, Boy Genius episode "Win, Lose and Kaboom", Poison Ivy in the Young Justice episode "Revelation").
- December 23: Christian Potenza, Canadian actor (voice of Chris McLean in the Total Drama franchise, Jude Lizowski in 6teen and Total DramaRama, Dirk Danger in Almost Naked Animals).
- December 29: Jude Law, English actor (voice of Pitch Black in Rise of the Guardians, Yon-Rogg in the What If...? episode "What If... Nebula Joined the Nova Corps?").

== Deaths ==
=== January ===
- January 1: Maurice Chevalier, French actor and singer (sang the title song in The Aristocats), dies at age 83.
- January 3: Frans Masereel, Belgian painter, graphic artist, and wood engraver (The Idea), dies at age 82.
- January 11: Padraic Colum, Irish poet, novelist, dramatist, biographer, playwright, children's author and collector of folklore (screenwriter for the stop-motion animated film Hansel and Gretel: An Opera Fantasy), dies at age 90.
- January 16: Ross Bagdasarian, American animator, composer, singer and actor (creator of Alvin and the Chipmunks), dies from a heart attack at age 52.
- January 17: Rochelle Hudson, American actress (voice of Honey in the Bosko cartoons), dies at age 55.

=== February ===
- February 19: Tedd Pierce, American animation writer (Fleischer Studios, Warner Bros. Cartoons) and actor (voice of King Bombo in Gulliver's Travels, C. Blagley Beetle in Mr. Bug Goes to Town, Tom Dover in The Dover Boys, Tall Shipwreck Survivor in Wackiki Wabbit), dies at age 65.

=== March ===
- March 19: Carl Meyer, American actor (voice of Smack in Mr. Bug Goes to Town), animator and animation writer (Fleischer Brothers, Paramount Animation), dies at age 78.
- March 31: Aleksandar Denkov, Bulgarian illustrator, animator and comics artist (Bolen (The Little Thief)), dies at age 47.

=== April ===
- April 25: George Sanders, British actor and singer (voice of Shere Khan in The Jungle Book), commits suicide at age 65.

=== May ===
- May 5: Frank Tashlin, American cartoonist, comics artist, illustrator, screenwriter, film director and animator (Van Beuren Studios, Terrytoons, Warner Bros. Cartoons, Walt Disney Animation Studios, Columbia Pictures, United Artists), dies at age 59.
- May 23: Nino Pagot, Italian comics artist and animator (Calimero), dies at age 64.

=== June ===
- June 26: David Lichine, Russian-American ballet dancer and choreographer (Fantasia, Make Mine Music), dies at age 61.

=== August ===
- August 14: Roland Crandall, American animator (Fleischer Studios), dies at age 79.

=== September ===
- September 12: Max Fleischer, Polish-American animator, film director and producer, and comics artist (founder of Fleischer Studios), dies at age 89.

=== October ===
- October 21: Felix Felton, British actor (voice of the Ghost of Christmas Present in A Christmas Carol), dies at age 61.

=== November ===
- November 21: Tom Palmer, Italian-American animator, animation director, and training film supervisor (Walt Disney Productions. Walter Lantz Studio, Warner Bros. Cartoons, creator of Buddy), dies at age 70.
- November 27: Carl W. Stalling, American composer (Walt Disney Animation Studios, Looney Tunes) music arranger, voice actor, (voice of Mickey Mouse in The Karnival Kid), and co-inventor of the click track, dies at age 81.

== See also ==
- 1972 in anime

== Sources ==
- Neuwirth, Allan (2003), "Makin' Toons Croon: Those Musical Marvels Who Compose the Merry Melodies", Makin' Toons: Inside the Most Popular Animated TV Shows and Movies, Allworth Press, ISBN 978-1621531975
- Sigall, Martha (2005). "The Boys of Termite Terrace". Living Life Inside the Lines: Tales from the Golden Age of Animation. University Press of Mississippi. ISBN 9781578067497.
- Strauss, Neil (2002). "Tunes for Toons: A Cartoon Music Primer". In Goldmark, Daniel; Taylor, Yuval (eds.). The Cartoon Music Book. A Capella Books, an imprint of Chicago Review Press, Inc. ISBN 978-1569764121.
