= Mariel Soria Miranda =

Mariel Soria Miranda (born 1946, San Salvador de Jujuy) is an Argentinian/Catalan illustrator, cartoonist and theatrical costume designer.

She trained alongside Alberto Breccia and Hugo Pratt, who at the time were directors of the well known Escuela Panamericana de Arte. Soon, she started working at Producciones Garcia Ferré, Buenos Aires collaborating with the team on the production of two feature films and a series of cartoons. At the same time she also collaborated in children's magazines such as Anteojito or Billiken.

In 1975, due to the political situation in her country, Argentina, she decided to move to Barcelona, Catalonia, starting to collaborate with Editorial Bruguera, Cavall Fort, Editorial Juventud and La Galera. She worked in tandem with the novelist and screenwriter Andreu Martin, creating the series: "Doctor Delclós" and "Bruc2" for the magazine Sal Común, and "Sam Balluga" and "Contactos" for the magazine El Jueves until the end of 1984.

In 1975 with other professionals from the world of comics and illustration, she founded the "Colectivo de la Historieta" which published the magazine Trocha/Troya.

All of her series can be categorized as ‘author’s works’ and are characterised by the use of a fine irony and critical sense. Her work has been published in almost all Spanish comic magazines: El Víbora, Totem, Zona 84, Creepy, Madriz, Metrópolis, Cimoc, Cul de Sac, El Jueves...; in France in Pilote and Virus; as well as in Italy in Alterlinus. Critics place her at the forefront of current cartoonists.

From 1983, her most famous character, Mamen, created with actor Manel Barceló for the magazine El Jueves, was a series which finished in 2012. The character Mamen differed from the other characters she created because this character showed a young, independent and sexually uninhibited woman. Her collaboration with Manel Barceló resulted in 37 comic strips entitled Night & Day and Quel·lo for the newspaper El Periódico de Cataluña, as well as "Federica" for the newspaper La Vanguardia and "En tres Actes" for the magazine Entreactes.

She started as a theatrical costume designer in 1988 for the play All Singing, All Dancing at the Teatre Grec in Barcelona. She was recognised in 1993 for her costumes created for La Guàrdia Blanca (the White Guard) at the Teatre Romea in Barcelona, and in 2000 for costumes designed for the play Shylock at the Teatre Màlic. From this moment on, she began a series of collaborations with the TNC (National Theatre of Catalonia), among which Fairy (2007) and Ball de Titelles (the Puppets’ dance) (2012) were both nominated for the Butaca awards, as were la Dama de Reus (The Lady of Reus) (2008), El casament d’en Terregada (The wedding of Terregada) (2019) among others.

In 2020 the Directorate General of Cultural Heritage of the Generalitat of Catalonia acquired two original drawings from the publication Python Trip belonging to the author's archive and in 2021 the MNAC (National Art Museum of Catalonia) accepted a donation of six original drawings of the character Mamen in watercolor and Chinese ink.

== Awards ==
- 18th International Film Festival for Children and Youth, Gijón (1980)
- Comic Drawing Award, Diario de Avisos (1988) (2015)
- Jury for the National Comic Award, nominated by the Federation of Professional Illustrators Associations (2008)
- Jury for the 34th Cornellà City Council Comic Competition (2018)
- 23rd Ivà Award (2016)
- Honorary Award from the Collective of Comic Authors, at the Barcelona Comic Fair (2024)

== Exhibitions ==
- Presentes: Autoras de tebeo de ayer y de hoy (Present. Women comic book authors of Yesterday and Today) curated by the Collective of Comic Book Authors, Rome (2016)
- Monographic exhibition by Mariel Soria Els 53 Primers (The 53rd firsts), organized by the City Council of Cornellà de Llobregat (Barcelona) (2018)
- Opened the traveling exhibition; Còmic. Somnis i història (Comic: Dreams and History), CaixaForum Barcelona (2022)
