= List of The Adventures of Hijitus episodes =

The Adventures of Hijitus is an Argentine animated series created in 1967 by Spanish-Argentine cartoonist Manuel García Ferré. It was the first animated series in Latin America intended for television market, and has been considered the most successful series in the history of Latin American cartoons.

The series was first broadcast on August 7, 1967, by the Canal 13, as minute-long interstitials, which were repeated throughout the day at different times, then coming to theaters in feature-length format.

The strip stars Hijitus, a kid who lives in a pipe in the city of Trulalá that is ravaged by the actions of Professor Neurus, among others. To defend Trulalá and his friends (Oaky, Pichichus, Anteojito and Larguirucho), Hijitus transforms himself into Super Hijitus, a superhero with great strength, capable of flying.

== Series overview ==
Season	Episodes	Originally released	
Season	Episodes	First released	Last released
Pilot		Unaired	
1	9 (24 segments)	August 7, 1967	December 25, 1967
2	17 (49 segments)	January 22, 1968	December 16, 1968
3	13 (52 segments)	January 6, 1969	December 8, 1969
4	13 (52 segments)	January 5, 1970	December 7, 1970
5	13 (52 segments)	January 4, 1971	December 6, 1971
6	4 (16 segments)	January 3, 1972	March 27, 1972
7	3 (11 segments)	November 6, 1995	December 25, 1995
8	2 (6 segments)	January 22, 1996	February 19, 1996

== Pilot (1966) ==
No.	Title	Original release date
0	"Hijo de Papitus"	February 1, 1966
It is the test episode that García Ferré presented to Channel 13, as a demonstration of the series Hijitus.

== Season 1 (1967) ==
No. overall	No. in season	Title	Original release date
1	1	"El Puerto"	August 7, 1967
The presentation of a child carrying a top hat and surrounded by bandits in the port of Trulalá.
2	2	"Robo al Banco"	August 14, 1967
Neurus and his gang try to rob a bank, with the help of robot Trucu, but they encounter a kid with superpowers that will prevent him. Note: This episode is based on the original pilot.
3	3	"La Trompada Tramposa"	August 21, 1967
Neurus aims to win a boxing prize with a remote-controlled glove, the victim is Larguirucho who must face the situation.
4 (4-5)	4 (4-5)	"El Abuelitus Tuerca"	August 28, 1967
Hijitus helps a grandpa to participate in a car race.
5 (6-7)	5 (6-7)	"Pajaritos"	September 11, 1967
No data available.
6 (8-11)	6 (8-11)	"El Castillo Embrujado"	September 25, 1967
A witch and her owl take possession of the sombreritus and both Neurus, his gang and Hijitus, will be in trouble for the powers of the sorceress who lives in a mysterious castle. Note: In this episode, Cachavacha appears for the first time
7 (12-15)	7 (12-15)	"La Joyería"	October 23, 1967
No data available.
8 (16-20)	8 (16-20)	"El Boxitracio"	November 20, 1967
Appears the egg of a Boxitracio, unique animal of its kind and Neurus wants to seize it to sell it to the zoo of Trulalá. Note: These are the first appearances of the Boxitracio, the Director of the Museum and the Director of the Zoo.
9 (21-24)	9 (21-24)	"Sombreros Voladores"	December 25, 1967
The Professor Neurus and another of his inventions, the flying hats that invade Trulalá.

== Season 2 (1968) ==
No. overall	No. in season	Title	Original release date
10 (25-28)	1 (1-4)	"¡Un OVNI en Trulalá!"	January 22, 1968
While a UFO invades Trulala, Hijitus adopts Pichichus, when he sees him unprotected and about to be attacked by another larger dog. Note: In this episode, Pichichus appears for the first time.
11 (29-31)	2 (5-7)	"Los Sueños de Pichichus"	February 19, 1968
No data available. Note: It is the last episode of the series in black and white until "Cachavacha, Anteojito y el Genio" of 1971.
12 (32-35)	3 (8-11)	"El Portaaviones Atómico"	March 11, 1968
Hijitus does not want to lose sight of Neurus and his gang, who want to take over an atomic aircraft carrier to conquer Trulalá. Note: It is the first episode of the series in color until "Humanum Magnetismo" of 1971.
13 (36-39)	4 (12-15)	"Botines Goleadores"	April 8, 1968
Larguirucho becomes the idol of a soccer team with the help of remote-controlled cleats invented by Neurus.
14 (40-43)	5 (16-19)	"¡Peligro en el Volcán!"	May 6, 1968
Hijitus decides to cure his friend Boxitracio, in the hot springs of a volcano, there will discover a surprise in the hands of Neurus.
15 (44-47)	6 (20-23)	"El Dragón Cantor"	June 3, 1968
Fire burns the forests of Trulalá and the author is nothing less than a dragon that tries to sing and provoke fires by the strong flares that it fires of his mouth, when singing his favorite songs.
16 (48-49)	7 (24-25)	"Oaky Silver"	July 1, 1968
Oaky, tired of the life of a millionaire, escapes from his mansion and meets Hijitus, whom he deceives saying that he is a poor and abandoned child. Note: In this episode, Oaky and Gold Silver appear for the first time.
17 (50-51)	8 (26-27)	"La Panadería"	July 15, 1968
Oaky joins the gang of Professor Neurus, who has a bakery with the idea of helping Bodegga and Rapino who are in prison. Note: In this episode, Bodegga and Rapiño appear for the last time.
18 (52-55)	9 (28-31)	"Plaza de Niños"	July 29, 1968
Oaky makes a rebellion in the square with several children and Hijitus must prevent Neurus from abducting him to ask for a ransom, forcing Larguirucho to dress as a nanny to carry out his plan.
19 (56-57)	10 (32-33)	"La Gran Carrera"	August 26, 1968
To compete with his father, Oaky decides to win a trophy and with the help of Larguirucho they get into a car race.
20 (58-59)	11 (34-35)	"La Escoba Voladora"	September 9, 1968
Oaky's whims have no end, so he gets into trouble when he decides to buy Cachavacha's flying broom and pretends a kidnapping to get money from his father.
21 (60-61)	12 (36-37)	"El Pucho-péndulo"	September 23, 1968
Oaky escapes again from his house and joins the band of Professor Neurus, who with his partner's fag, invents a dangerous deadly pendulum.
22 (62-63)	13 (38-39)	"El Cumpleaños de Oaky"	October 7, 1968
Neurus and Pucho try to take Larguirucho's invitation to Oaky's birthday, so they could enter Gold Silver's mansion and steal.
23 (64-65)	14 (40-41)	"La Olla Pirula"	October 21, 1968
Neurus, Oaky, Gold Silver and Larguirucho, embark on a trip to the Amazon for an expedition, there they will encounter a dangerous tribe called The Achicamucho.
24 (66-67)	15 (42-43)	"El Soldado Larguirucho"	November 4, 1968
Larguirucho is drafted and enters with his friend Oaky, who seize a tank with which they look for the most dangerous adventures.
25 (68-71)	16 (44-47)	"El Primo Ketchum"	November 18, 1968
Obsessed with defeating Hijitus, Professor Neurus takes Ketchum, a cousin of Pucho who lives in Rosario, to use his brute force. Note: In this episode Ketchum appears for the first time.
26 (72-73)	17 (48-49)	"La Luna está de Remate"	December 16, 1968
To get money, Neurus decides to auction lots on the moon and when Hijitus finds out about this unusual sale, and tries to prevent it.

== Season 3 (1969) ==
No. overall	No. in season	Title	Original release date
27 (74-77)	1 (1-4)	"Neurus Petrolium Company"	January 6, 1969
Neurus gets rich thanks to the discovery of oil in Sanborombóm Bay, but problems start when the wells dry up.
28 (78-81)	2 (5-8)	"La Marañaza"	February 3, 1969
Hijitus tries to uncover the mystery surrounding a new creature that terrorizes Trulalá, his name is The Marañaza. Note: This is the last episode in which Trucu appears.
29 (82-85)	3 (9-12)	"Ketchum vs. Boxitracio"	March 3, 1969
With the help of Ketchum, Neurus seeks to win the crown of a boxing championship, for which Ketchum must face as a rival, nothing less than Boxitracio. Note: In this episode, they appear for the last time Ketchum and the Zoo Director.
30 (86-89)	4 (13-16)	"Operativo Canino"	March 30, 1969
Neurus and his gang, already tired of not being able to fight Súper Hijitus, decide to work with the Kennel Truck and thus capture Pichichus, which will serve as bait to destroy their enemy.
31 (90-93)	5 (17-20)	"El Otro Súper"	April 28, 1969
Neurus invents a Súper Hijitus lookalike robot to commit robberies, for that reason Hijitus is accused and tried. That is why his faithful friend Oaky tries to help him as his defense lawyer.
32 (94-97)	6 (21-24)	"La Estatua de Neurus"	May 26, 1969
Neurus wants to move on to immortality and leave a statue in his honor, for that he plans his end with the most hilarious attempts.
33 (98-101)	7 (25-28)	"El Gran Hampa Parte 1"	June 23, 1969
The mysterious and most dangerous of the leaders of the underworld, decides to judge nothing less than Professor Neurus, in his lair that is underwater.
34 (102-105)	8 (29-32)	"El Gran Hampa Parte 2"	July 21, 1969
Hijitus and Oaky try to help Neurus, so that he doesn't fall back into the hands of the mysterious Gran Hampa, who hides in an abandoned house.
35 (106-109)	9 (33-36)	"¿Quien es el Gran Hampa?"	August 18, 1969
Larguirucho dresses like a detective and decides to find out who is Gran Hampa, accusing Pipo Mancera and in conclusion finds himself with an incredible surprise. Note: In this episode appears for the last time Serrucho.
36 (110-113)	10 (37-40)	"Papucho en Bancarrota"	September 15, 1969
With the idea of his butler Gutiérrez, Gold Silver pretends to be broke, so Oaky, Hijitus and Larguirucho decide to look for work to help him, until they sign up for a singing contest. Note: In this episode, Gutiérrez appears for the first time.
37 (114-117)	11 (41-44)	"Oaky Ejecutivo"	October 13, 1969
Oaky is transformed into a perfume entrepreneur, taking the place of Gold Silver, to get his father heal from work stress.
38 (118-121)	12 (45-48)	"El Botellero Larguirucho"	November 10, 1969
Larguirucho is dedicated to work as a junkman and his friend Oaky helps, both of them, unwittingly, are mixed in the robbery of the museum.
39 (122-125)	13 (49-52)	"Gallinas Desplumadas"	December 8, 1969
The new business of Neurus is to sell feather cushions, for that plucks to all the hens of Trulalá and must face with Cachavacha, when it plans to pluck to its Owl.

== Season 4 (1970) ==
No. overall	No. in season	Title	Original release date
40 (126-129)	1 (1-4)	"El Zumbador Gigante"	January 5, 1970
Neurus and Pucho, disguise a plane as a giant bird, to frighten the peasants of Trulalá and thus take money from them with the deception of a service that will fight the dangerous animal.
41 (130-133)	2 (5-8)	"El Misterio de las Armaduras"	February 2, 1970
Pichichus disappears on his birthday and is charged with the theft of the mysterious armor of the Gold Silver mansion.
42 (134-137)	3 (9-12)	"La Isla Fantasma"	March 2, 1970
Neurus and Pucho begin to demolish the billionaire Gold Silver's ships, to destroy its shipping company and seize it.
43 (138-141)	4 (13-16)	"Oaky Enamorado"	March 30, 1970
Oaky does not play with his friends, he does not want to eat, nor does he want to sleep because he is in love.
44 (142-145)	5 (17-20)	"Pichichus Enamorado"	April 27, 1970
Oaky gives a serenade to his crush and she remains indifferent until she gets tired of serenade and harassment by taking other measures.
45 (146-149)	6 (21-24)	"Vecinita... ¿Enamorada?"	May 25, 1970
Oaky resorts to the haunted powers of Cachavacha so that the girl he likes falls in love with him and thus gets into serious problems.
46 (150-153)	7 (25-28)	"Dedo Negro"	June 22, 1970
A mysterious and dangerous man, friend of Neurus and his gang, arrives at Trulalá to confuse the inhabitants with his unusual disguises. Note: In this episode appears for the first time Dedo Negro.
47 (154-157)	8 (29-32)	"Neurus Tintorero"	July 20, 1970
Hijitus looks for a way to recover the magical powers of his sombreritus that was washed in Professor Neurus's laundromat.
48 (158-161)	9 (33-36)	"El Perrosaurio"	August 17, 1970
Larguirucho makes Pichichus a perrosaurio to boost his confidence and win the first prize on a dog show. Guest star: Donald McCluskey
49 (162-165)	10 (37-40)	"Raimundo, el Terrible"	September 14, 1970
The new terror of a children's orphanage is called Raimundo, a naughty and dangerous boy who disturbs the crew of the institution.
50 (166-169)	11 (41-44)	"Rebelión en el Patronato"	October 12, 1970
Súper Hijitus tries to take the leadership to Raimundo and thus to disrupt the plans of a rebellion of children who seize the orphanage.
51 (170-173)	12 (45-48)	"Raimundo Ratonero"	November 9, 1970
Gutierrez locks Raimundo in the basement of the Silver's mansion, to seize the money that his master Gold Silver wants to don to the orphanage. Thus Raimundo befriends the mice that inhabit the place.
52 (174-177)	13 (49-52)	"El Espejo Multiplicante"	December 7, 1970
The new invention of Neurus is a mirror that multiplies images and that destines it to falsify the most valuable paintings of Trulalá.

== Season 5 (1971) ==
No. overall	No. in season	Title	Original release date
53 (178-181)	1 (1-4)	"El Pingüino Hippie"	January 4, 1971
The story of a penguin who plays guitar with strange melodies, provoking the interest of the Director of the Museum, who must face the plans of Professor Neurus and his gang.
54 (182-185)	2 (5-8)	"El Gusano Fulano"	February 1, 1971
Neurus, Pucho and Larguirucho, manufacture a giant worm to terrify the peasants of Trulalá.
55 (186-189)	3 (9-12)	"El Elefantito Bebé"	March 1, 1971
The story of an elephant who is abandoned and taken care of by Hijitus. The little one looks for his mother who works in a circus.
56 (190-193)	4 (13-16)	"El Príncipe Elalí Buen Hají"	March 29, 1971
Neurus uses Larguirucho to make him believe that he's a marahaja, in a confused legacy of a prince of the East who seeks to recover his throne and his wealth. Note: In this episode, Anteojito and Antifaz appear for the first time.
57 (194-197)	5 (17-20)	"Los Celos de Larguirucho"	April 26, 1971
Anteojito and Antifáz leave Villa Trompeta and they move to Trulalá, thus the jealousy of Larguirucho begins. Note: This episode is a continuation of the last of Season 3.
58 (198-201)	6 (21-24)	"Manipocho vs. Caramelate"	May 24, 1971
Hijitus helps his friend Anteojito to sell peanuts and must compete with Larguirucho who tries to break the deal with other inventions of Professor Neurus.
59 (202-205)	7 (25-28)	"El Camión Blindado"	June 21, 1971
The new job of Larguirucho is to drive an armored truck and must take care of the plans of Neurus and Pucho.
60 (206-209)	8 (29-32)	"Barrilito de Cerveza"	July 19, 1971
Anteojito and Antifáz open an inn where Barrilito sings and dances, giving reasons to the plans of Neurus, to seize the nice man and make him work for him. Note: In this episode, Antifaz appears for the last time.
61 (210-213)	9 (33-36)	"Boxitracios vs. Aguilotros"	August 16, 1971
Hijitus and Anteojito must find peace on an island where Boxitracios and Aguilotros are at war. Note: In this episode, it appears for the last time Boxitracio.
62 (214-217)	10 (37-40)	"El Gato Chimenea"	September 13, 1971
The story of an evil cat, who takes possession of the magic sombreritus of Hijitus, facing Anteojito who wishes to help his friend to retrieve it.
63 (218-221)	11 (41-44)	"Ludovico"	October 11, 1971
Larguirucho, Anteojito and Hijitus find themselves with an old watch that transports them to other centuries, to live the most curious adventures and to face a strange dragon with seven heads.
64 (222-225)	12 (45-48)	"Humanum Magnetismo"	November 8, 1971
Anteojito and Hijitus travel to study and Professor Neurus takes possession of Hijitus's house, to install a new invention that dominates the inhabitants of Trulalá. Note:It is the last episode of the series in color until "La Computadoracha Neurotronica" of 1995.
65 (226-229)	13 (49-52)	"Cachavacha, Anteojito y el Genio"	December 6, 1971
No data available. Note: From this episode, the series returns to be produced in black and white until "La Carrera Aerea" of 1972.

== Season 6 (1972) ==
No. overall	No. in season	Title	Original release date
66 (230-233)	1 (1-4)	"Mefistón y la Pluma Encantada"	January 3, 1972
The mystery begins at an auction of a pen and its inkwell with the legend of being enchanted.
67 (234-237)	2 (5-8)	"Los Milenarius"	January 31, 1972
No data available.
68 (238-241)	3 (9-12)	"El Huracán Henriqueta"	February 28, 1972
Hurricane Enriqueta devastates with all Trulalá and for this reason an art festival is organized to raise funds.
69 (242-245)	4 (13-16)	"Carrera Aérea"	March 27, 1972
Hijitus and his friends participate in an unusual plane race to obtain a ring on top of a mountain. Note: In this episode, appears for the last time Anteojito, and it is also the last episode in black and white in general.

== Season 7 (1995) ==
No. overall	No. in season	Title	Original release date
70 (246-249)	1 (1-4)	"La Computadoracha Neurotrónica"	November 6, 1995
No data available. Note: From this episode, the series returns to be produced in color.
71 (250-252)	2 (5-7)	"El Concurso de Tango"	December 4, 1995
No data available. Note: In this episode, Vecinita appears for the last time.
72 (253-256)	3 (8-11)	"Felina, La Nueva Secretaria"	December 25, 1995
No data available. Note: In this episode, they appear for the last time Neurus, Pucho, Serrucho and Comisario.

== Season 8 (1996) ==
No. overall	No. in season	Title	Original release date
73 (257-260)	1 (1-4)	"El Genio de Cachavacha"	January 22, 1996
No data available. Note: In this episode, they appear for the last time Larguirucho, Cachavacha and the owl, and this is also a remake of the 1971 episode.
74 (261-262)	2 (5-6)	"Los Milenarius"	February 19, 1996
No data available. Note: In this episode, they appear for the last time Hijitus, Oaky, Dedo Negro and Gutierrez, and this is also a remake of the 1972 episode.
