= Manuelita (film) =

1999 film

- Spanish poster
- Directed by: Manuel García Ferré
- Written by: Manuel García Ferré (writer); María Elena Walsh (story)
- Produced by: Carlos Mentasti. Diana Cordoba
- Starring: Rosario Sánchez Almada; Pelusa Suero; Enrique Conlazo; Miguel Esteban; Cecilia Gispert; Susana Sisto
- Cinematography: Jorge Somma
- Edited by: Luis Busso
- Music by: Néstor D'Alessandro; Roberto Lar; María Elena Walsh
- Production companies: Producciones García Ferré; Telefe
- Distributed by: Columbia TriStar Films de Argentina
- Release date: 8 July 1999; (Argentina)
- Running time: 86 minutes
- Country: Argentina
- Language: Spanish
- Budget: $5 million
- Box office: $6.6 million

Manuelita is a 1999 Argentine animated adventure comedy-drama film directed by Manuel García Ferré. It was Argentina's official Best Foreign Language Film submission at the 72nd Academy Awards, but did not manage to receive a nomination. It is also the first ever animated film by Scope, and the first ever family movie by Scope.

Manuelita comes from a children's song of María Elena Walsh. Isa Cucinotta, co-curator of Rá-Tim-Bum Castle, said that Manuelita was as famous in Argentina as Winnie the Pooh was in the United States.

== Plot ==
The Patriarch of the Birds (a character who first appeared in Trapito) tells other animals the story of Manuelita, the turtle. Born in Pehuajó, Manuelita has an adventurous and curious spirit since she hatches from an egg. A few years pass and she starts school with her two best friends, Topi and Bartolito. Three dogs mock and bully them in their way to and back. When they take Manuelita's backpack and toss it around, Bartolito bravely stands up for her, pouncing one of the crooks, resulting in the two of them fighting on the ground. The other two crooks join in, but are chased away by the school janitor and assistant teacher Larguirucho (from The Adventures of Hijitus) on his bicycle.

That night, Manuelita dreams of Bartolito as a knight coming to her rescue from the crooks, who are shown as a three-headed dragon. The Patriarch tells that the years pass and Manuelita blossoms into a beautiful teenager. Bartolito is in love with Manuelita as well, and confesses his feelings in a letter, but when he tries to deliver it to her, they discover that there is a carnival fair in Pehuajó. Since the family plans to go, Bartolito decides to save the letter for later and join them.

Seeing a giant hot air balloon, Manuelita asks for permission to ride in it, much to her parents' chagrin, but Grandpa convinces them to let her. Larguirucho holds onto the ropes that held the balloon on the ground, but the wind carries it, along with Manuelita in the basket, before anyone can climb to her rescue. Manuelita at first enjoys the trip, but after a mischievous seabird pops the balloon, she falls in the middle of what appears to be the Atlantic Ocean. There, she is picked up by a crew of pirate pigs in their ship after they mistake the basket for a treasure chest. The captain orders his men for her to be thrown into the brig of the ship until a decision is made about what to do with her. Inside the brig, she meets Veni, Vidi and Vici, the three mice who cheer her up with a song. Their joyful singing and dancing wakes up the captain, who orders to get Manuelita. She and the mice manage to escape outside. They are surrounded by the pigs, but the weight of the pigs causes the ship to sink. Manuelita and the mice manage to grab a board and swim, while the pirates get stranded. Manuelita and mice later meet giant elderly sea turtle, who takes them all to be safe on land.

When they reach a French coast town, Manuelita and the mice go separated ways. Looking for a place to spend the night, she stops to watch a fashion show from outside a building. She is then greeted by François, the owner of the place, who introduces her to fashion designer Coco Liché, promising her a career as a model in Paris. Meanwhile, in Pehuajó, Bartolito, Topi, Larguirucho and Manuelita's grandfather try to build an airship to go looking for Manuelita, which they manage to do after several failed attempts. After seeing her on the cover of a fashion magazine, Manuelita's mother tells everyone about her staying in Paris. Ready to travel to France, Larguirucho and Topi climb onto the airship while Bartolito and Grandpa stay behind and look for a compressor. However, by accident, they cut the ropes, leaving without Grampa and Bartolito. During the trip, Larguirucho and Topi encounter the same seabird who pops the air balloon, but as first decided, they manage to defeat it. In Paris, Manuelita entrusts François with her money to have it sent to their parents in Pehuajó every month, along with and letters to Bartolito, not knowing he is cheating her out by keeping the money in his bag and the letters in a desk. After several days of travel, Larguirucho and Topi arrive in Paris. While looking for Manuelita on the streets of the city, they start asking about her whereabouts to several characters they meet, including Henri de Toulouse-Lautrec, the sentient statue of The Thinker and Carlos Gardel.

Meanwhile, Manuelita discovers François' lies about sending the letters, but doesn't find out about the money. Afraid he may get exposed, François decides to destroy her career. During a fashion show, he sabotages a dress she is modeling, managing to humiliate her, but is discovered by her. Manuelita soon finds about the money. In panic, François accidentally drops his bag and it all flies out the window. He tries catch it, but falls off of the balcony and stays hanging from a pole. Alone and sad, Manuelita leaves the agency with only a few dollars and wanders through the city, going to Notre-Dame de Paris and reminiscing about her past life. The next day, she hears music coming from under a bridge where she is walking by and listens to an Edith Piaf-like bowerbird singing about her to the melody. She then finds that it is Larguirucho and Topi who are playing the music. Happy to see them, the three travel back home by buying a plane with the little money Manuelita still has. When she finally returns to Pehuajó, Manuelita reunites with her family, who are overjoyed to see her. She also reunites with Bartolito, now the head teacher of the school, following his mother's retirement, much to her happiness. After some time, Manuela and Bartolito marry in a joyful wedding with many guests, including Anteojito, Oaky, Hijitus and Trapito (all characters created by the film's director Manuel García Ferré), as well as the Patriarch of the birds, who continues narrating by breaking the fourth wall, telling audience that the couple have a bright future together. Manuela and Bartolito get into another hot air balloon, waving goodbye to everyone, and traveling to their honeymoon.

== Characters ==
- Manuelita - A female turtle who wants to see the world and is full of curiosity from the moment she is born. When she arrives in Paris, she becomes a fashion model. Since childhood, she starts developing romantic feelings for her best friend Bartolito.
- Bartolito - A male turtle; Manuela's best friend since childhood, and later husband. He's a greaser and mechanic. He later becomes the new headmaster of the school following his mother's retirement.
- Topi - A mole and Bartolito's best friend.
- Mr. and Mrs. Turtle - Manuelita's parents.
- Grandpa Turtle - Manuelita's grandfather and Mrs. Turtle's father. He is possibly a widow, since his wife isn't seen around. In his youth, he used to ride in air balloons, and exhorts Manuelita to do the same.
- Mrs. Eduvigia - A female adult turtle, Bartolito's mother and the school's headmistress and head teacher until her retirement, leaving her son in charge. It's implied that she might have feelings for Larguirucho.
- The dog crooks - A trio of bullies who antagonize Manuelita, Bartolito and Topi during their childhood. However, at the end, they are show to have gone straight.
- The seabird - One of the antagonists; a sadistic an evil seabird who enjoys attacking others and destroying things during his flights. He is taken out by Larguirucho.
- Captain Pig - The second antagonist; a pirate pig who, along with his crew, takes Manuelita hostage. After their ship sinks, they are left stranded in the middle of nowhere.
- Veni, Vidi and Vici - A trio of partying mice who live on Captain Pig's ship and befriend Manuelita.
- The old turtle (LaCarey) - An elderly hawksbill sea turtle. She helps Manuelita and the mice arrive to Paris.
- François - The antagonist in Paris; a potoroo who works for Coco Liché. He's sly, greedy and always lying. He uses Manuelita under the pretense of making her a famous model, but keeps most of the money she earns for her parents for himself.
- Coco Liché - A French turkey who is a famous fashion designer prone to nervous affections. He is in charge of a fashion show in Paris. He is a male parody of Coco Chanel.
- Larguirucho - A tall and ungainly rat who works as the school janitor and as an assistant teacher to Mrs. Eduvigia. This film marks his third appearance in a García Ferré's movie.
- The Patriarch of the Birds - A wise old owl who narrates the story to other animals. This film marks the second appearance of the character after Trapito.

Other well known García Ferré's characters, such as Anteojito, Hijitus, Trapito and Oaky make non-speaking cameos as guests of Manuelita and Bartolito's wedding at the end of the film.

== Voice cast ==
- Rosario Sánchez Almada as Manuelita
- Pelusa Suero as Larguirucho/Coco Liché/Carlos Gardel
- Cecilia Gispert as Bartolito
- Norma Esteban as Mrs. Turtle
- Ariel Abadi as Mr. Turtle/Additional Voices
- Néstor D'Alessandro as Manuelita's Grandfather (uncredited)
- Enrique Conlazo as The Patriarch of the Birds
- Susana Sisto as LaCarey

Thierry Pons, Liliana Mamone, Horacio Yervé, José Luis Perticari and Alicia Iacovello provide additional voices for other characters.

== See also ==
- List of submissions to the 72nd Academy Awards for Best Foreign Language Film
- List of Argentine submissions for the Academy Award for Best Foreign Language Film
