= The Adventures of Hijitus =

- Also known as: Hijitus, Super Hijitus
- Las aventuras de Hijitus
- Genre: Animation; Comedy; Adventure
- Created by: Manuel García Ferré
- Based on: Hijitus comic series
- Written by: Manuel García Ferré; Inés Geldstein; Néstor D'Alessandro
- Directed by: Manuel García Ferré
- Voices of: Néstor D'Alessandro; Pelusa Suero; Liliana Mamone; Mario Gian; Susana Sisto; Marion Tiffemberg; Pedro Aníbal Mansilla; Enrique Conlazo
- Narrated by: Pedro Aníbal Mansilla
- Theme music composer: Néstor D'Alessandro
- Country of origin: Argentina
- Original language: Spanish
- No. of seasons: 8
- No. of episodes: 74 (262 segments) (+ pilot) List of episodes

Production
- Producer: Manuel García Ferré
- Running time: 1 minute (daily episodes); 5 minutes (segments); 5-25 minutes (story arcs)
- Production company: Producciones García Ferré

Original release
- Network: Canal 13
- Release: 7 August 1967 – 1 March 1996

The Adventures of Hijitus (Spanish: Las aventuras de Hijitus) is an Argentine animated series created in 1967 by Spanish-Argentine cartoonist Manuel García Ferré. It was the first animated series in Latin America that was made for television, and has been considered the most successful series in the history of Latin American cartoons. the series is based on the cartoon character called Hijitus who first appeared in the Aventuras de Pi-Pio comic series in 1955.

The series first aired on 7 August 1967, on Canal 13, and was rerun throughout the day at different times. It later was compiled into a film format and screened in cinemas.

The main character of the series is Hijitus, a street child who lives in the sewers of the fictional city of Trulalá. Trulalá is ravaged by the evil actions of villains such as Professor Neurus, Pucho, Granhampa and Dedo Negro, among others. Hijitus is granted magical powers through his hat sombreritus, which allow him to transform himself into Super Hijitus, a strong superhero who can fly. He uses his power to defend his city and his friends: Oaky, Pichichus, Anteojito and Larguirucho.

== Origins ==
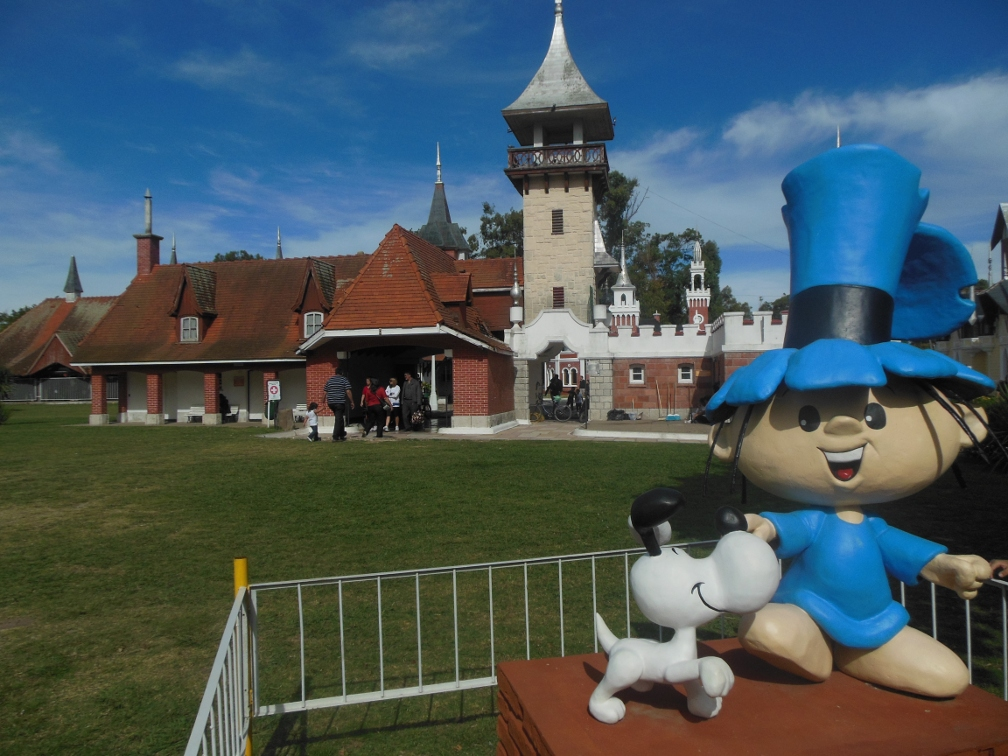
Statue of Hijitus at The Children's Republic

Hijitus was originally created as a minor character in the comic strip The Adventures of Pi-Pio (Spanish: Las aventuras de Pi-Pío), published in September 1955 in Billiken magazine. García Ferré was a weekly collaborator at Billiken at the time, and Pio-Pio was the first serial comic strip he created. In Pio-Pio, Hijitus is depicted as a descendant of pharaohs and one of the inhabitants of Villa Leoncia, the imaginary city in which the adventures of Pi-Pío are set.

== Plot ==
Hijitus is a street kid who lives in a sewer pipe in the city of Trulalá (the "cañitus"). He is supported by his friends, Pichichus (his dog) and Oaky.

The city of Trulalá is ravaged by the evil Professor Neurus, who the incompetent legal system, represented by a "Council of Elders", are unable to stop. One of Hijitus' friends, Larguirucho, is a naive young man who spends his time playing with Oaky and Hijitus, while also helping Professor Neurus with his evil plans.

In order to fight evil and more importantly to defend his friends, Hijitus can transform into "Super Hijitus", an indestructible superhero with incredible abilities, thanks to the power granted by his magic hat, Sombreritus. The dream of his nemesis Professor Neurus is to seize the hat, and use its power to control Trulalá. Hijitus does everything in his power to prevent this from happening.

== Main Characters ==
=== Protagonists ===
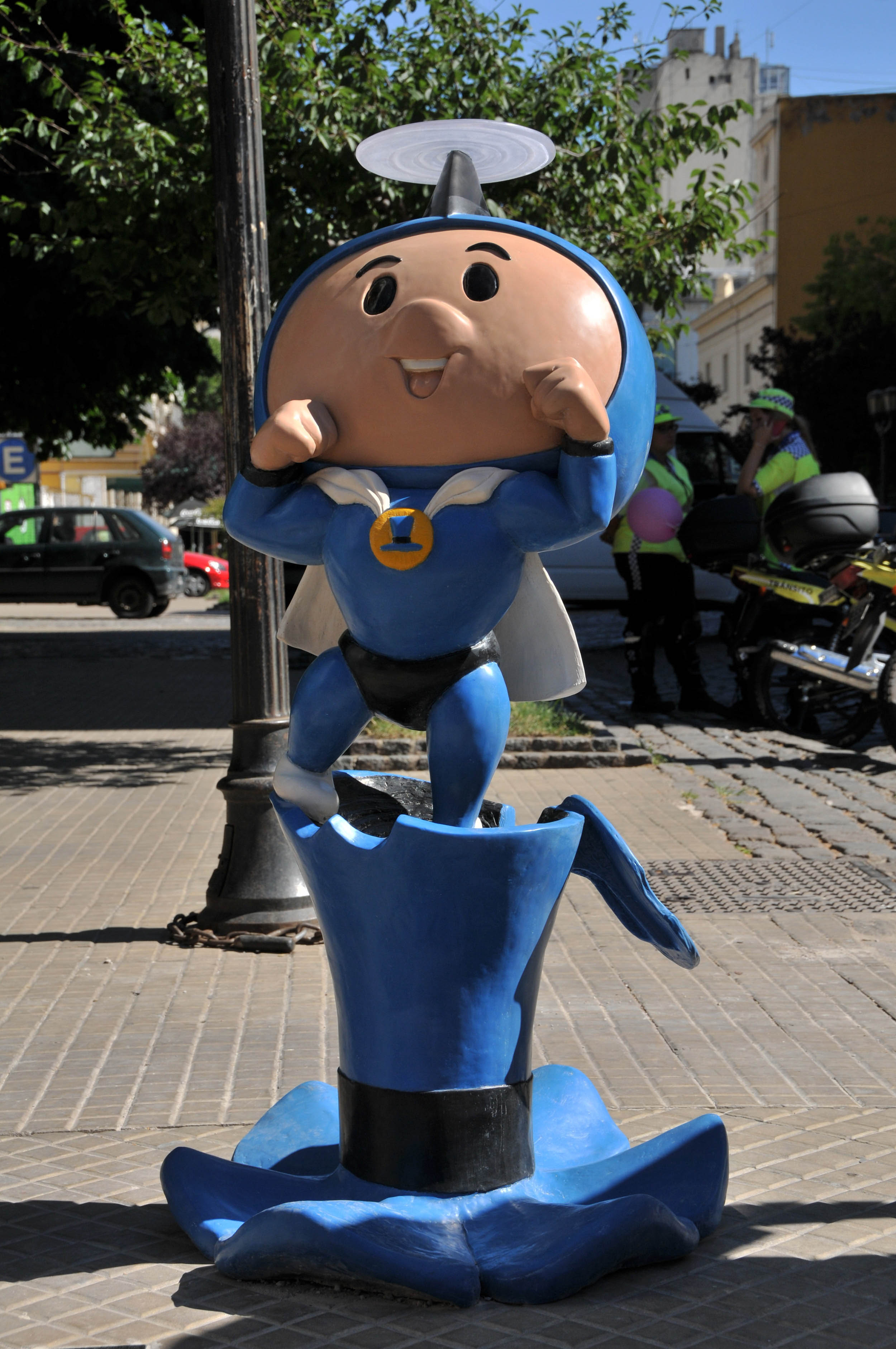
Statue of Super Hijitus in Buenos Aires

- Hijitus/Super Hijitus: Hijitus is a poor boy who lives in a sanitary sewer with his dog Pichichus. He has a group of friends, which includes: Oaky, Pichichus, and Larguirucho. He is characterized by his values of friendship, justice, and solidarity. He is always wears a blue top hat called Sombreritus. Hijitus can transform into "Super Hijitus" by passing through the hat and saying "Hat, sombreritus, transform me into Super Hijitus!" (Spanish: "Sombrero, sombreritus, ¡conviérteme en Super Hijitus!"). As Super Hijitus, he is indestructible and can fly, abilities he uses to face the villain of the series, Professor Neurus. His favorite expressions are "Ojalita, ojalata, chuculita, chuculata" and "fufu... y chucu, chucu, chucu, chucu".
- Pichichus: Hijitus' dog and friend. He can also become Super Pichichus if he passes through Hijitus' hat. Hijitus adopted him in the adventure called "An UFO in Trulalá", where he defended Hijitus from wild stray dogs, becoming Hijitus' mascot and his faithful sidekick. He doesn't talk and his dialogue consist of barking.
- Oaky: The infant son of the richest man in Trulalá, Gold Silver. He is a baby, and is Hijitus' closest friend. He wears diapers and carries with him two pistols. His catchphrase is "Tiro, lio y cosha golda". He is a very spoiled and pampered child, which has led him to ally with Neurus on more than one occasion. Despite this antagonistic tendency, Oaky is a good-hearted boy, and very brave for his age.
- Anteojito: A boy about 8 years old who wears big glasses (hence his name, meaning lit. 'Telescope'), known for being cheerful and positive. He lives with his uncle Antifaz (lit. 'Mask'). Both Anteojito and Antifaz had a separate plotlines from Hijitus within the series' universe, as they lived in another city (Villa Trompeta) and had their own magazine (Anteojito Magazine). However, Anteojito began to appear on Hijitus' adventures eventually.
- Larguirucho: A tall, ungainly, and gullible mouse who is friends with Hijitus, but also occasionally participates on the side of the evil Professor Neurus without being fully aware of the evil of their deeds. Larguirucho is known for being a good friend with good feelings, but has little intelligence to distinguish right from wrong. He is known to responding to calls with the phrase: Blá má fuete, que no te ecucho (English: Peak mo' lodly, I can't 'ear you). He is the only character who has appeared in every Manuel García Ferré movie.

=== Antagonists ===
- Professor Neurus: The main antagonist of the series. He is an evil yet bumbling scientist, whose aim is to take power in Trulalá with the help of his inventions. He is aided by his henchmen Pucho and Serrucho, sometimes also adding Larguirucho to his gang. His catchphrase is "Shut up, you fool!" (Spanish: ¡Cállate, retonto!). Professor Neurus is also memorable for his way of distributing the spoils after a criminal act: "One for you, two for me, one for you, ten for me, another for you, everything for me." On one occasion, Professor Neurus used a monstrous contraption called the Marañaza to steal Gold Silver's fortune, with the help of Oaky, who wanted to "have more money than his daddy".
- Pucho: A mouse henchman under the orders of Professor Neurus. He is a typical "inmate" of Buenos Aires' slums, talking in slang and constantly having a cigarette in the mouth, which can transform into any object. Pucho is a fan of tango and constantly uses the words "This that..." to start a sentence.
- Serrucho: Professor Neurus' second mouse henchman. He is similar in appearance to Largirucho or Pucho, but is much shorter in height, with a hat that entirely covers his eyes, and has an enormous pair of front teeth. He doesn't talk. Instead, he vigorously grinds his teeth with a hand as if it was a serrucho (Italian and Rioplatense Spanish for "saw"), hence his name.
- Witch Cachavacha (Bruja Cachavacha): An evil which who acts alone, with the help of her faithful owl Pajarraco. She lives in the countryside, in a gaucho ranch style home she refers to as a covacha ("hovel"). She constantly seeks to harm the inhabitants of Trulalá and flies around on a broomstick.
- Pajarraco: Cachavacha's pet owl, he can speak and is frequently beaten by the witch.

=== Secondary Characters ===
- The Commissioner of Trulalá: A police authority in Trulalá, portrayed like a man of the Argentine Littoral region, with a correntino accent.
- Gold Silver: The good-natured although naive father of Oaky. He is a millionaire of English or American origin and is the richest man in Trulalá. His catchphrase is "Oaky, my son."
- Antifaz: The uncle of Anteojito, who, as his name indicates, always wears a mask on his face. Both characters belong and contribute to the magazine Anteojito, only occasionally intervening in the adventures of Hijitus.
- The Director of the Museum: A gracious old man of vast knowledge and the director of the Trulalá museum, who speaks with an English or American accent. Every time Hijitus has a question, they check his encyclopedias.
- Cape Lopecito: Assistant and executing arm of the orders of Trulalá commissioner.
- The Neighbor from Across the Road: A little girl who lives in front of Oaky and Gold Silver's mansion. Oaky is in love with her and serenades her while she stands on the balcony, though his feelings are not reciprocated, and she is instead in love with Hijitus. She is polite, well educated, and plays the piano.
- Kechum: Cousin of Pucho who, when angry, vibrates and causes earthquakes. He is from Rosario.
- Gutiérrez: The traitorous butler of Gold Silver, who sometimes tries to steal his employer's fortune. He does not hesitate to ally himself with Professor Neurus on several occasions.
- Bodega and Rapiño: Two delinquents often associated with Professor Neurus.
- Raimundo: The most mischievous orphan of Trulalá's orphanage. He is a problematic and impolite child, who ends up being adopted by Larguirucho. Both characters have their story in Misfortune of Larguirucho (Spanish: Desventuras de Larguirucho).

=== Episodic Characters ===
- The Boxitracio: A strange animal (resembling a cross between kangaroo, rabbit, and bird) believed to be extinct due to it being the only specimen of this species, with boxing gloves, and with a tendency to box at the slightest threat. Although he appeared in very few episodes, this is one of the most popular and remembered characters of the series. His only form of expression was the onomatopoeia Tere quete tere quete ua ua ua. They are enemies with the Aguilotro species on the Island of the Sun.
- Trucu: A Frankenstein-like robot created by Neurus to rob banks, which knocks down walls and iron gates.
- The Great Hampa: Enigmatic boss of Professor Neurus, who is later revealed to be none other than Serrucho.
- Black Finger: Delinquent who can disguise himself as anyone, but is unable to hide his distinctive black thumb.
- The Singing Dragon: A dragon who expels fire out of his mouth whenever he sings, causing chaos in Trulalá. He lives on the outskirts of civilization.
- The Hippie Penguin: A penguin whose guitar playing provoked destruction.
- The Chimney Cat: A mischievous and cunning cat which manages to steal Hijitus' hat and become "Super Chimney".

== Broadcasting ==
=== TV ===
The Hijitus series was originally broadcast by Channel 13 of Buenos Aires, between 1967 and 1974, as a microprogram which was only one minute long. It was broadcast between the advertising batches from Monday to Friday, and was rerun daily. On weekends, the program was aired in full, as a summary of the microprograms, on the show La Feria de la Alegría, and later on El Club de Hijitus.

El Club de Hijitus was a program created in 1968, and broadcast on Sundays at 11:00 am by Channel 13. It was created as a result of the success of the series, and was led by animators Guillermo Lázzaro and Amalia Scaliter. The program featured the full weekly summary of the series, with the presence of Hada Patricia, the clowns Firulete, Cañito and Carlitos Scazziotta, and disguised actors representing the characters of the series, such as Hijitus, Cachavacha, Larguirucho, Neurus, The Commissioner, etc.

=== Film adaptations ===
On 12 September 1973, the 82 minute long feature film The Adventures of Hijitus was released.

=== DVD ===
In December 2008 the first box set composed of 5 DVDs was released, a compilation of 53 episodes of the original series, including extras such as trailers, trivia, characters information, wallpapers, music clips and synopses. Another 5-set DVD compilation was later released in order to complete the series.
