= Anteojito (magazine) =

Argentine children's magazine

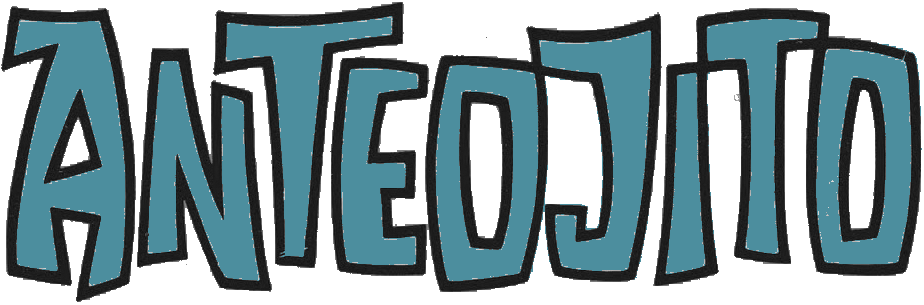
- Editor: Manuel García Ferré
- Categories: Education
- Frequency: Weekly
- Circulation: 300,000
- Publisher: Editorial García Ferré
- First issue: October 8, 1964
- Final issue: No.1925 (December 28, 2001)
- Country: Argentina
- Language: Spanish

Anteojito was an Argentine children's magazine for school-aged children, created by Manuel García Ferré. The first issue was published on October 8, 1964, and, along with Billiken, it was the encyclopedic reference magazine for every Argentine child for decades.

== History ==
Anteojito was a classic for Argentine children for several generations. In its heyday, it reached print runs of hundreds of thousands of copies. Its pages featured characters such as Anteojito, Pi-Pío, Trapito, Hijitus, Larguirucho, Professor Neurus, Pucho, Calculín, Sónoman, Pelopincho and Cachirula, or Antifaz, Anteojito's uncle, who also had his own magazine. The magazine also included characters from international countries such as the Telerín Family or Lucky Luke.

School-related topics were the content of the magazine. Its pages showcased the work of renowned illustrators such as Roberto Bernabó, José Luis Salinas, Juan Arancio, Carlos Roume and Oswal, Jorge de los Ríos, Hugo Casaglia, Myriam Méndez, Nello Pallmiolli, Fabián de los Ríos, Roberto Barrios Angelelli, among others, as well as various scriptwriters and writers.

After 37 years, the magazine ceased publication in 2001 due to Argentina's economic crisis in the late 1990s and early 2000s. It had a total of 1,925 issues published, with its last edition appearing on December 28, 2001.
