= 1972 in anime =

The events of 1972 in anime.

== Releases ==
English name	Japanese name	Type	Demographic	Regions
Yuki's Sun	ユキの太陽 (Yuki no Taiyou)	Special	Shōjo	JA
Mock of the Oak Tree	樫の木モック (Kashi no Ki Mokku)	TV	Family, Children	JA, NA, EU
New Moomin	新ムーミン (Shin Mūmin)	TV	Family, Children	JA, AR, RU
The One Who Loves Justice: Moonlight Mask	正義を愛する者 - 月光仮面 (Seigi wo Ai Suru Mono - Gekkō Kamen)	TV	Shōnen	JA, EU
The Three Musketeers in Boots	ながぐつ三銃士 (Nagagutsu Sanjūshi)	Movie	Family, Children	JA, NA, EU, NL, RU
Triton of the Sea	海のトリトン (Umi no Toriton)	TV	Shōnen	JA, NA, EU, CH
Chappy the Witch	魔法使いチャッピー (Mahōtsukai Chappy)	TV	Shōjo	JA, EU
Akado Suzunosuke	赤胴鈴之助 (Akado Suzunosuke)	TV	Shōnen	JA, NA
Road to Munich	アニメドキュメント ミュンヘンへの道 (Anime Document: München e no Michi)	TV	General	JA
Devilman	デビルマン (Debiruman)	TV	Shōnen	JA, EU, RU
Go Get Team 0011	魔犬ライナー0011変身せよ! (Maken Liner 0011 Henshin Seyo!)	Movie	Shōnen	JA, EU
Mon Chéri CoCo	モンシェリCoCo	TV	Shōjo	JA
Astroganger	アストロガンガー (Astrogangā)	TV	Shōnen	JA, NA, EU, AR, CH
Tamagon the Counselor	かいけつタマゴン (Kaiketsu Tamagon)	TV	Children	JA, NA, EU
Piggyback Ghost	隆一まんが劇場 おんぶおばけ (Ryuuichi Manga Gekijou Onbu Obake)	TV	Children	JA
The Gutsy Frog	ど根性ガエル (Dokonjō Gaeru)	TV	Shōnen	JA, EU, AR
Mazinger Z	マジンガーZ (Majingā Zetto)	TV	Shōnen	JA, NA, EU, AR
Panda! Go Panda!	パンダコパンダ (Panda Kopanda)	Movie	Children	JA, NA, EU, CH
The Midnight Parasites	寄生虫の一夜 (Kiseichuu no Ichiya)	Short	General	JA
The Demon	鬼 (Oni)	Short	General	JA
The Monkey and the Crab	日本むかしばなし さるかに ( Nihon Mukashi-banashi: Sarukani)	Short	General	JA
Science Ninja Team Gatchaman	科学忍者隊ガッチャマン (Kagaku Ninja-tai Gatchaman)	TV	Shōnen	JA, NA, EU

== See also ==
- 1972 in animation
