= Manuelita la tortuga =

Song by Leda y María

from the album Doña Disparate y Bambuco
- Language: Spanish
- Released: 1962
- Genre: Children's music
- Length: 4:10
- Label: Disco Plin
- Songwriter: María Elena Walsh
- Producer: María Herminia Avellaneda

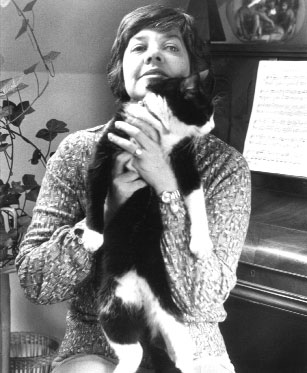
María Elena Walsh, 1971

"Manuelita la tortuga" (pronounced [ma.nwe.ˈli.tala toɾ.ˈtu.ɣa]; Spanish for "Manuelita the turtle") is a children's song by Argentine writer and musician María Elena Walsh, first recorded by Leda y María—her duo with Leda Valladares—and included in their 1962 EP Doña Disparate y Bambuco. It tells the story of a female turtle from the rural town of Pehuajó, who travels to Paris to undergo beauty treatments after falling in love.

In its native country it is a well-known children's song.

In 1997, Walsh released the children's book Manuelita ¿Dónde vas?, which expanded the story of the character. The 1999 animation film Manuelita was adapted from the song.

A French version of the song was written and made famous by Argentine singer Jairo.
