= Hijitus =

Argentine Cartoon Character

- Hijitus / The Adventures of Hijitus character
- Hijitus and his dog, Pichichus
- First appearance: "Aventuras de Pi-Pio (Billiken magazine)"; (September 1955)
- Last appearance: Hijitus comics (2012)
- Created by: Manuel García Ferré
- Voiced by: Néstor D'Alessandro
- Publisher: Editorial García Ferré

In-universe information
- Alias: Super Hijitus
- Species: Human
- Gender: Male
- Occupation: Superhero
- Weapon: Fists
- Family: Anteojito (cousin); Pichichus (pet)
- Origin: Trulalá
- Nationality: Argentine
- Nemesis: Professor Neurus

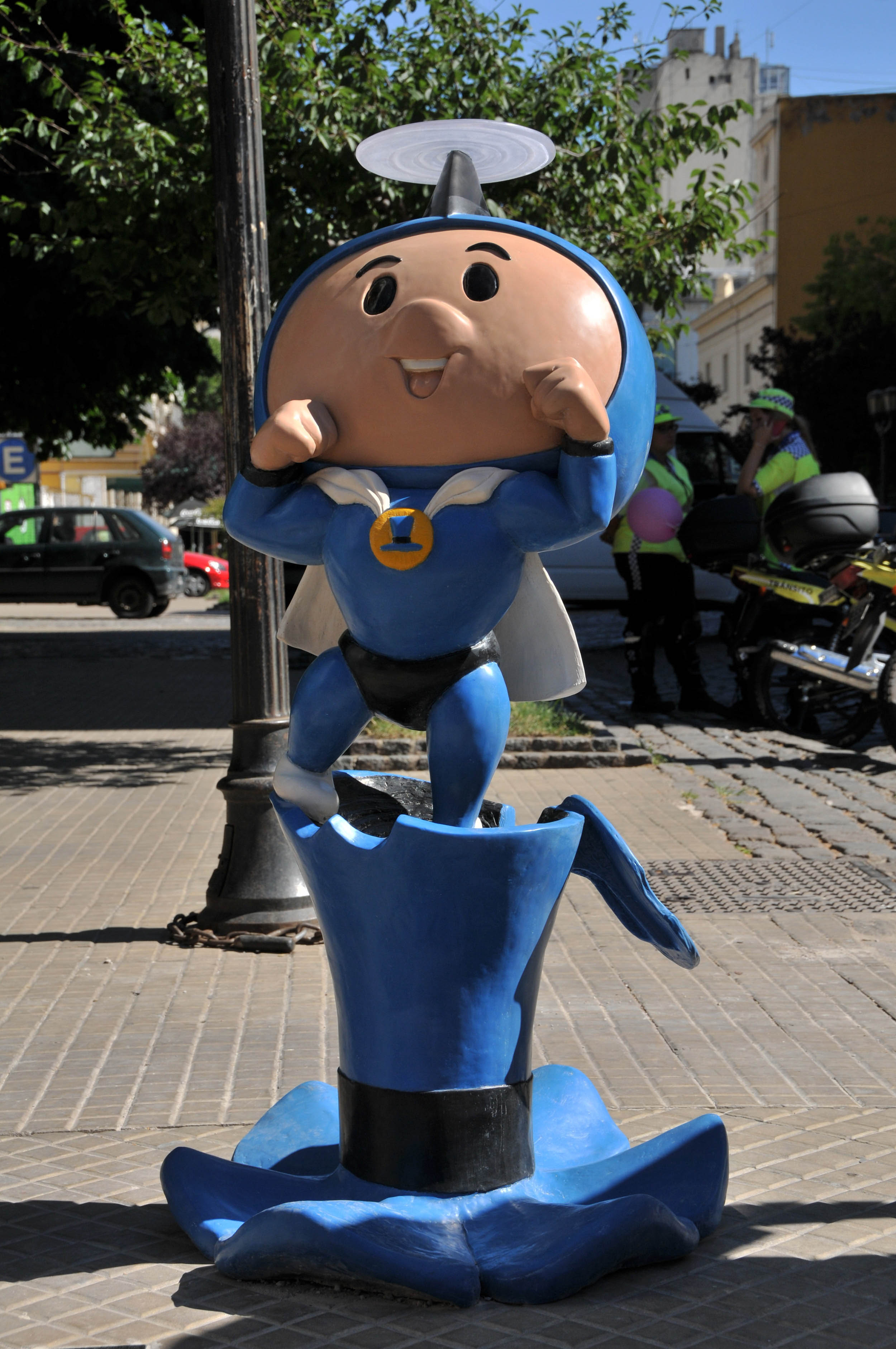
Statue of Súper Hijitus (Hijitus alter ego) at the "Paseo de la Historieta" of Buenos Aires

Hijitus is an Argentine comic superhero character created by Manuel García Ferré. He made his debut in September 1955 in the comic strip The Adventures of Pi-Pío, published in Billiken magazine. In his debut he wore a bowler hat, but when it was republished in the Anteojito magazine, Hijitus appeared with a top hat. He was only a side character then, but after having some modifications became the protagonist of his own action comedy animated series The Adventures of Hijitus which was broadcast in Argentina between 1967 and 1974. Later it in the 1990s and in 2010-2012 was broadcast again through El Trece channel with a high audience rate. He is one of the best-known Argentine comic characters, along with Patoruzú, Mafalda, Clemente, and Juan Salvo's Eternauta. The TV series is frequently re-transmitted on Argentine television as many Argentines perceive it as nostalgic.

Hijitus lives within the Manuel Garcia Ferre universe shared by many other characters like Anteojito, Larguirucho, among others.

Hijitus lives inside a giant pipe on the outskirts of town with his dog Pichichus. For Argentine popular culture "living inside a pipe" is analogous to being poor, so this means that Hijitus economic situation is bad. He does possess, however, a magical hat that allows him to convert into a superhero with multiple powers.

== Profile ==
Both the comic and series have a similar, simple structure. Hijitus is a poor good-hearted who fights against the evil plans of Professor Neurus (a mad scientist). When things became hard (usually the situation has reached a dramatic level) he transforms into Super Hijitus and acts to defeat Neurus and other villains. A recurrent theme was Neurus and his henchmen Pucho and Serrucho trying to separate Hijitus from his hat or steal it for possessing his magical powers, only to end up failing and in jail.

== Powers and abilities ==
Hijitus is a normal human being. However, when he uses his hat, he transforms into Super Hijitus, a super hero with super powers like: superhuman strength, superhuman speed, super endurance and invulnerability. Sometimes he has shown other powers like super breath or heat vision, and super speed that causes a tornado similar to Superman.

Despite his powers, Super Hijitus is not invincible sometimes he has suffered reversible damage. In the television episode "The Armored Truck" Neurus manages to damage the propeller of his super suit. In another chapter, "Neurus dyer" it is revealed that the little hat loses its powers after being washed, although the powers remain contained in the washing water and can be restored to the hat.

Hijitus becomes Super Hijitus while wearing his hat, when he says the magic words sombrero sombreritus convierteme en Super Hijitus. Then the hat covers his entire body making it pass through his open cup and emerging from it as Super Hijitus. The transformation process is reversed when Hijitus enters again to his hat through the top of it.

== Media ==
The first animated appearance of the character, named Las Aventuras de Hijitus, made its debut on TV in 1967. On 12 September 1973, a movie with the same name, was released in cinemas. Hijitus had also a comic book, edited in 1970.

== Characters ==
- Súper Hijitus
- Pichichus
- El Comisario
- Professor Neurus
- Pucho
- Serrucho
- Larguirucho
- Oaky
- Gold Silver

== See also ==
- The Adventures of Hijitus
