= Ico, el caballito valiente =

1987 Argentine animated film

Ico, el caballito valiente (meaning Ico, the brave little horse, also sometimes known in English as Ico, the Brave Horse) is a 1987 Argentine animated film based on a franchise that dates back to the 1970s.

== History ==
It started as a TV series in 1981, before it was adapted into a feature film directed by Manuel García Ferré and written by Ines Geldstein. After a 3-to-5 year production period, the movie was completed in 1983 and due to be premiered at the International Kids Film Festival in Portugal that year. It was not until 4 years later, on 9 July 1987, that the movie was officially released in Argentina by an independent distributor.

== Plot ==
Ico is a wild colt who lives in the forest with his mother and friends, including Jaba the boar whom he saves once from the Black Duke's hunt. Each full moon the animals hear in the distance the frightening and mysterious tolling of a bell. Ico wants to find out who rings the bell and why. One day he sees the royal parade and decides he wants to be the king's horse. He follows the parade and becomes friends with Larguirucho, the friendly castle horse keeper. In the night Ico tells his mother he wants to be the king's horse.

The next day, with Larguirucho's help, Ico sneaks into the castle where he meets the other stable horses. He learns that if he wants to be the King's horse, he has to talk to the Black Duke, the king's chief equerry, because he has the power to choose the king's horse. The horses warn Ico that the Black Duke is a very sinister and evil man. Grandpa Mateo, the oldest horse in the stable, tells him about a mysterious phantom bell tolling that frightens the horses. As every time they hear it, a horse disappears from the stable and never returns.

The next day, walking in the castle, Ico meets Preciosa, the daughter of the King's horse, whilst running after her, the Black Duke catches him. Ico tells him that he wants to be the king's horse, so the Black Duke promises to train him to become a royal steed. However he orders his henchmen to make the training very hard to discourage the little colt. Larguirucho brings Ico some food after the exhausting training, then they hear the bell tolling again. Larguirucho runs back to the stable and realizes that another horse has gone missing. He goes to talk to the King, but the Black Duke blames him for stealing the horses and puts him into prison. Later that night, Ico learns the story of the bell. It is said that an ancient greedy King conquered the neighbourhood and stole their gold. He melted the gold and cast a giant bell, whose tolling would remind the realm of his unlimited power. The bell was so huge, that the tower couldn't hold its tolling and crashed under its weight. The bell fell and buried the king underneath. The legend says that the ghost of the vain king, as a punishment for his greed, must toll the bell on each full moon.

Ico is determined to solve the mystery, as he thinks the person who tolls the bell is the same person that steals the horses from the stable. Ico sets off up the hill, to the ruins of the old castle, where he again meets Preciosa, who tells him her father – the king's horse – has gone missing. Ico discovers that it is the Black Duke and his henchmen who have stolen the horses from the stable. In order to use them to lift huge stones to then drop them on the bell to break it up for the gold. It is when this takes place that the tolling sounds. The Black Duke realizes Ico has seen them, so he captures him and ties him to the bell to be crashed by one of the stones. Preciosa sees this and runs to the forest for help, coming back with Ico's mom and friends. The Black Duke is clinging onto the swinging stone and rushing the horses to pull the ropes before Ico escapes. He finally cuts the rope so the rock would smash Ico, but Ico escapes at the last minute and the swinging stone turns and hits the bell, consequently crushing the Black Duke. Larguirucho becomes the new chief barn keeper, and Ico is offered a position as one of the king's horses. However, at the last moment, Ico changes his mind, deciding he would rather remain a wild horse. Preciosa decides to join him in the prairie.
