= Carlos Loiseau =

Argentine cartoonist and humorist

Carlos Loiseau ("Caloi")
- Born: November 9, 1948; Salta, Argentina
- Died: May 8, 2012 (aged 63); Buenos Aires, Argentina
- Other name: "Caloi"
- Years active: 1966–2012
- Spouse: María Verónica Ramírez
- Website: www.caloi.com.ar

Carlos Loiseau (November 9, 1948 – May 8, 2012) was a prolific Argentine cartoonist and humorist. He was popularly known in Argentina by his byline, Caloi.

== Life and work ==
Loiseau was born in Salta, and he was raised in Adrogué and Buenos Aires from age six. Adopting a portmanteau pseudonym based on his full name ("Caloi"), his caricatures first appeared in the popular current events weekly, Tía Vicenta, in 1966, and his first comic strip appeared in María Belén in 1967; both were satirical weeklies published by a fellow cartoonist, Juan Carlos Colombres.

Loiseau's first marriage, at age 19, ended after two years. His first book, El libro largo de Caloi (Caloi's Long Book), was published in 1968, and in his first animated short, Las Invasiones Inglesas (The British Invasions), in 1970. Caloi was the chief political cartoonist for the news weekly Análisis between 1968 and 1971. He later became a regular contributor to the satirical magazines Satyricón (1972–74) and Mengano (1974-76), to the sports weekly El Gráfico (1976–82), and numerous other periodicals.

His most enduring association, however, would be with the nation's leading news daily, Clarín. His work first appeared in the daily in 1968 as part of his Caloidoscopio series, and in 1973 he introduced readers to what became his signature brainchild: "Clemente." The adoptive, flightless bird of a Buenos Aires tram conductor, Clemente became known for his fondness for football, irony, olives, and women (particularly "la mulatóna," a voluptuous but staid Afro-Cuban character of his same species). Another recurring character in the series - Clemente's observant son Jacinto - was patterned after one of Caloi's own sons. A fixture comic strip on the back page of Clarín for decades, Clemente also followed ongoing current events and at times created controversy.

The most memorable of these was a storyline around the 1978 FIFA World Cup (hosted by Argentina) that led to a well publicized dispute with a leading sportscaster at the time, José María Muñoz, and indirectly with the dictatorship itself. Throwing large quantities of paper confetti is an Argentine custom at the beginning of football matches and at other celebrations, such as New Year's Day. Muñoz and government officials sought to discourage this custom (which they saw as littering) during the event, however, while Caloi conspicuously supported it through Clemente. The fans' preference - and that of Caloi - prevailed when with the support of FIFA officials, scoreboard operators programmed a digital Clemente exhorting fans to "throw confetti, guys!" (Tiren papelitos, muchachos!). Authorities responded by instructing police officers stationed at stadium entrances to sequester newsprint from spectators or any other paper items that could be made into confetti; the fans' ingenuity ultimately made the remaining World Cup matches in which the Argentine team played some of the most confetti-strewn in local football history.

Caloi would find himself at odds with figures from the same dictatorship even after the return of democracy. An episode of his popular Channel 13 children's show, Clemente, was banned in 1983 by judicial injunction. The episode featured a storyline in which la mulatóna was kidnapped by a bat-wing eared vampire resembling former Economy Minister José Alfredo Martínez de Hoz (who sued for defamation); the vampire's ransom - 40 billion dollars, "plus interest" - referred to the foreign debt amassed during the conservative Economy Minister's tenure. Spun off from an animated special aired during the 1982 FIFA World Cup, the show introduced Clemente fans to other characters, notably the "Cameroonian fan" and his signature ditty: Burum-boom-boom. Co-written by Alejandro Dolina and Jorge Palacio ("Faruk"), the show was a success and remained on the air until 1989.

Caloi remarried, and he and María Verónica Ramírez had five children. They enjoyed a good working relationship as well, and together produced his next long-running television series, Caloi en su tinta (Caloi in his Ink), which she directed. The program had a more cultural focus and featured animated shorts from around the world, as well as his own work and those of other Argentine illustrators. Airing on the state-owned ATC from 1990, the show received little support from the network despite earning a Martín Fierro Award in 1993 and was eventually withdrawn by the Loiseaus themselves in 1999. It reappeared briefly on cable television in 2002, returned to public television in 2005, and earned a number of awards.

His other credits include scripts for the theater and advertisers; as a co-writer for Dolina's 1988 television series La barra de Dolina; as a jurist for numerous cinema and animation awards; and the lion emblem for Club Atlético River Plate. His works were featured exhibits at among other venues the Recoleta Cultural Center in 1987 and 1999; in Adrogué in 2000; at the Palais de Glace in 2004; and in Alcalá de Henares, Spain, in 2009. He shared the latter exhibit with his son Juan Martín ("Tute"), after whom Clemente's own son Jacinto was patterned, and who became a noted illustrator in his own right.

Caloi also produced a traveling festival of animated film from 1999 to 2001 whose features were projected onto moveable, inflatable screens mounted in parks across the country. He had 40 books published between 1968 and 2008, of which 17 were Clemente compilations. He earned the Konex Award for his work as a graphic humorist in 1982 and 1992, as well as the Yomiuri Prize (Tokyo, 1984), and at the International Festival of the Humor of Bordighera (1994) among others. He was named an Illustrious Citizen of Buenos Aires in 2009.

The noted illustrator continued to work despite declining health in later years, and on May 3, 2012, his sole full-length animated film, Ánima Buenos Aires, premiered. Caloi died five days later in a Buenos Aires clinic; he was 63.
