= Zairaini Sarbini =

Malaysian freelance voice actress (1972–2021)

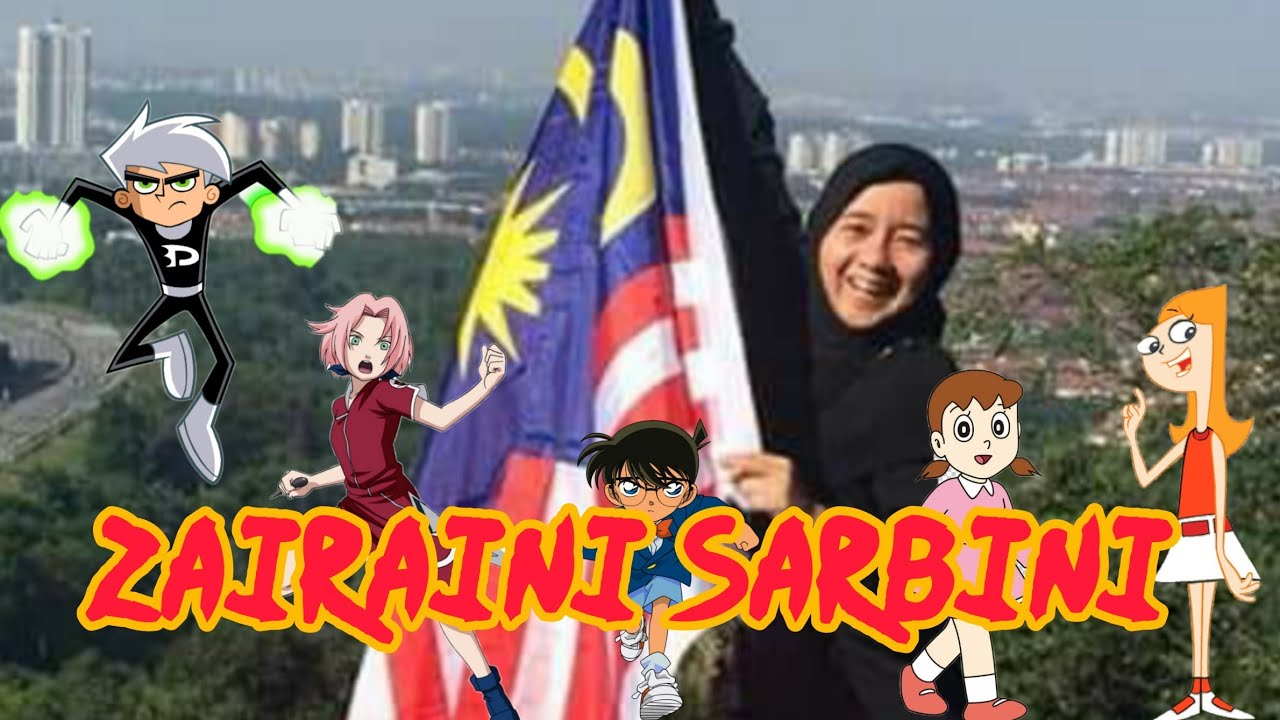
- Born: 1 November 1972
- Died: 9 August 2021 (aged 48); Damansara Damai
- Resting place: Kampung Puah Islamic Cemetery, Gombak, Selangor
- Occupation: Voice actress
- Years active: 1991–2021

Zairaini binti Sarbini (1 November 1972 – 9 August 2021) was a Malaysian freelance voice actress who dubbed for anime, foreign films, cartoons and TV programs in Malay that air on the Astro Ceria, Nickelodeon, Cartoon Network and Disney Channel Malaysia. She was also the aunt of the young Malay voice dubbing actor, Arfalie Fikrie Razali. She was formerly a voice actress at Filem Karya Nusa.

She first started voice acting at the Bukit Kepong theater in 1991, although, she did say that she felt a bit nervous when it was the first time performing a Malay voice role. Zairaini died from a colon infection caused by a cervical tumour on 9 August 2021, and was buried at Kampung Puah Islamic Cemetery in Gombak, Selangor.

== Roles ==
=== Anime ===
- Crayon Shin-chan - Midori Yoshinaga, Micchi Hatogaya, Ryuko Okegawa (2002–2008)
- Doraemon - Shizuka Minamoto (1st voice)
- Detective Conan - Conan Edogawa (2005–2008)
- Naruto - Sakura Haruno, Hinata Hyuga (2005–2008)
- Crush Gear Turbo - Kaoru Hanano
- Futari wa Pretty Cure - Nagisa Misumi/Cure Black, Sanae Yukishiro
- Ganso Tensai Bakabon - Hajime-chan
- One Piece - Kaya, Bellemere, Nojiko, Tashigi, Carmen (Episodes 50 & 51), Apis (Episode 54 to 61)
- Nintama Rantarō - Rantarō Inadera
- Atashin'chi - Mikan Tachibana
- Mirmo Zibang - Kaede Minami
- Perman - Mitsuo Suwa (2006-2009)
- Digimon Savers - Yoshino Fujieda
- Ninja Hattori-kun - Ken'ichi Mitsuba
- ToraDora - Taiga Aisaka
- Hyperdimension Neptunia: The Animation - Histoire, Pirachu, Plutia/Iris Heart

=== Television Animated Series ===
- Danny Phantom - Danny Phantom/Danny Fenton, Valerie Gray, Penelope Spectra (1 episode) (2006–2008)
- Totally Spies! - Samantha "Sam" Simpson
- Phineas and Ferb - Candace Flynn, Princess Baldegunde, Melissa, Inspector Initials, Stacy Hirano (1 episode), Vanessa Doofenshmirtz (11 episodes) (2008-20??)
- SpongeBob SquarePants - Sandy Cheeks, Karen
- The Garfield Show - Dr. Liz Wilson
- Bananas in Pyjamas - Lulu
- Avatar: The Last Airbender - Katara
- Chalkzone - Rudy Tabootie, Queen Rapsheeba, Nurse Jenny, Spyfly, Weather Broadcaster
- My Friend Rabbit - Hazel, Edwina, Amber Gibble, Coral Gibble, Jade Gibble
- We Kids are Powerful (我们小孩有力量) - Xiao Mao, Ai Mei
- Kitty Is Not a Cat - Kitty

=== Anime Films ===
- King of Thorn - Kasumi Ishiki

=== Animated Films ===
- Phineas and Ferb the Movie: Across the 2nd Dimension - Candace Flynn, Candace-2
- A Goofy Movie - Roxanne, kid
- An Extremely Goofy Movie - Beret Girl (Mocha Chino)
- Finding Nemo - Dory
- Bionicle 3: Web of Shadows - Roodaka

=== Live Action Television ===
- Goosebumps - Carly Beth Caldwell (Kathryn Long) (Episodes: The Haunted Mask I and II)
- Hannah Montana - Additional voices
- The Suite Life of Zack & Cody - Additional voices

=== Live Action Films ===
- The Chronicles of Narnia: The Lion, The Witch and the Wardrobe
- The Pacifier - Zoe Plummer (Brittany Snow), Lulu Plummer (Morgan York)
