= Sónoman =

Publication information
- First appearance: December 15, 1966 in the Anteojito magazine (Buenos Aires)
- Created by: Osvaldo Walter Viola ("Oswal")

In-story information
- Abilities: Mental-Music Power

Sónoman (Sonoman) is a superhero created in Argentina by Osvaldo Walter Viola ("Oswal"). The first release was December 15, 1966. His power was the poder Músico-Mental (Mental-Music Power in English). This power allowed him to have the strength of "three ramming rhinos", move transformed into a sound wave and produce deafening sounds. It was published for ten years in various magazines.

== Sources ==
=== Official website of the author ===
- Oswal. "Sitio web oficial de Oswal".

=== Other pages ===
- Giunta, Néstor. "Más personajes de la historieta argentina". Historietas argentinas (in Spanish).
- Osvaldo Laino (ed.). "En sus propias palabras..." Revista Dibujantes Nº1 (Segunda época) (in Spanish). pp. 4–5.
