= Yuki's Sun =

1972 Japanese short film

- ユキの太陽
- Directed by: Hayao Miyazaki
- Written by: Hayao Miyazaki
- Based on: Yuki's Sun by Tetsuya Chiba
- Production company: Tokyo Movie
- Release date: 1972
- Running time: 5 minutes
- Country: Japan
- Language: Japanese

Yuki's Sun (Japanese: ユキの太陽, Hepburn: Yuki no Taiyō) is a 1972 Japanese short animated film directed by Hayao Miyazaki.

== Scenario ==
The film follows Yuki, a 10-year-old girl living in an orphanage who searches for her parents in Hokkaido.

== Production ==
Yuki's Sun was based on the 1963 shōjo manga of the same name by Tetsuya Chiba. Tokyo Movie asked Miyazaki to direct what was envisioned to be the pilot episode of a television series; however, the project was shelved after it failed to impress television producers.

Yuki's Sun was Miyazaki's solo directorial debut; he had previously co-directed episodes of Lupin the 3rd Part I alongside Isao Takahata.

== Release ==
On 26 December 2013, Yuki's Sun was screened in 76 cinemas across Japan by Aeon Entertainment. Yuki's Sun was released as part of a collection of animated films and episodes by Walt Disney Japan in November 2015.
