= Anteojito y Antifaz, mil intentos y un invento =

- Directed by: Manuel García Ferré
- Written by: Manuel García Ferré
- Produced by: Manuel García Ferré; Julio Korn
- Starring: Marión Tiffemberg; Pedro Mansilla
- Cinematography: Osvaldo Domínguez
- Edited by: Silvestre Murúa
- Music by: Roberto Lar
- Color process: Eastmancolor
- Production company: Producciones García Ferré
- Distributed by: Pel-Mex (original release); Buena Vista International (2001 re-release)
- Release date: 14 September 1972
- Running time: 80 minutes
- Country: Argentina
- Language: Spanish

Anteojito y Antifaz, mil intentos y un invento (English title: Anteojito and Antifaz, A Thousand Attempts and One Invention) is a 1972 Argentine animated comedy-drama film written and directed by Manuel García Ferré. The film premiered in Argentina on September 14, 1972. It was re-released on July 12, 2001.

== Plot ==
Anteojito is a poor orphan 10-year-old boy who lives with his Uncle Antifaz in an apartment house in a city named Villa Trompeta. Uncle Antifaz tries to invent an invisibility formula with Anteojito's help, and Cachavacha, a witch and Uncle Antifaz's neighbor who lives in the apartment right under his, tries to steal it as revenge for to his explosions destroying her apartment. Anteojito sells some balloons and meets his friend Buzoncito, a little red mailbox. The balloons he was selling escape when he argues with a group of brats who mocked him. The circus comes to town and he helps out a friendly clown and his sick daughter by posing as a second, singing, clown. Two con men named Bodega and Rapiño are impressed by Anteojito's singing and pose as talent agents who can get him lucrative theatrical and operatic engagements, being hired by Cachavacha to have him away from Uncle Antifaz. Bonaño, a good-natured cat (tall with funny hat), takes him to Master Meethoven, a Beethoven-esque feline music teacher. Anteojito becomes a star, but he unknownly lets success go to his head, as he snubs Uncle Antifaz, and dismisses Bodega and Rapiño, who begin fight over the money. The distraught Antifaz gives up his experiments, which are immediately continued disastrously by Cachavacha, who ultimately dies on an explosion. Anteojito is told a story within the film (based on a separate book by García Ferré, El Pararrayos o Historia de una Ambición). This story is about an iron fence spike who was part of a fence that was thrown away in a dumpster. This spike had an ambition to become famous and be notice all the time by the public. The iron spike placed itself on higher positions as time went by, and even fought with a sword for a position on a coat of arms inside a mansion. However, the spike was still not satisfied, and eventually fulfilled its dream by becoming a lightning rod on top of a cathedral, where it was forever alone, and nobody could reach it. At last, Anteojito realizes that wealth is worthless without true friendship. He returns to being a little boy living with Uncle Antifaz, who throws away the invisibility formula he has finally invented.

== Production staff ==
=== Crew ===
- Written, produced and directed by: Manuel García Ferré
- Associate co-producer: Julio Korn
- Sequence director: Néstor Córdoba
- Animators: Natalio Zirulnik, Carlos A. Pérez Agüero, Jorge Benedetti, Alberto Grisolía, Hugo Csecs, Horacio Colombo, Roberto García, Mauro Chitti
- Inbetweeners: María Elena Soria, Laureano López, Beatríz Baldi, Susana Macaya, Norberto Burella
- Art direction: Hugo Csecs
- Backgrounds: Hugo Csecs, Walter Canevaro, Manuel Amigo
- Ink and paint supervisors: Néstor Domínguez, Mirta Fassanella
- Ink and paint: Elisa Aguiló, Estela Blanco, Inés Erausquín, Marta Di Guillo, Lidia Parón, Susana Solimena, Liliana Tirinello
- Cinematography and special effects: Osvaldo Domínguez
- Camera: Jorge Somma, Eduardo Chaile, Rubén Lamponi
- Music composed and conducted by: Roberto Lar
- Sound engineer: Francisco Busso
- Sound recordist: Americo Gianello
- Edited by: Silvestre Murúa
- Negative cutter: Sara Gallego

=== Cast ===
- Anteojito: Marión Tiffemberg
- Antifáz: Pedro Mansilla
- Other voices: Pelusa Suero, Ivan Grey, Inés Geldstein, Néstor D'Alessandro, Enrique Conlazo, Mario Gian, Claudia D'Alessandro, Silvia D'Alessandro, Liliana Mamone

=== Technical specifications ===
- Color by: Eastmancolor
- Film processing: Laboratorios Alex, S. A.
- Sound system: RCA

== See also ==
- List of animated feature-length films
- El Apóstol (first Argentine animated feature film, 1917)
