= Clemente (comics) =

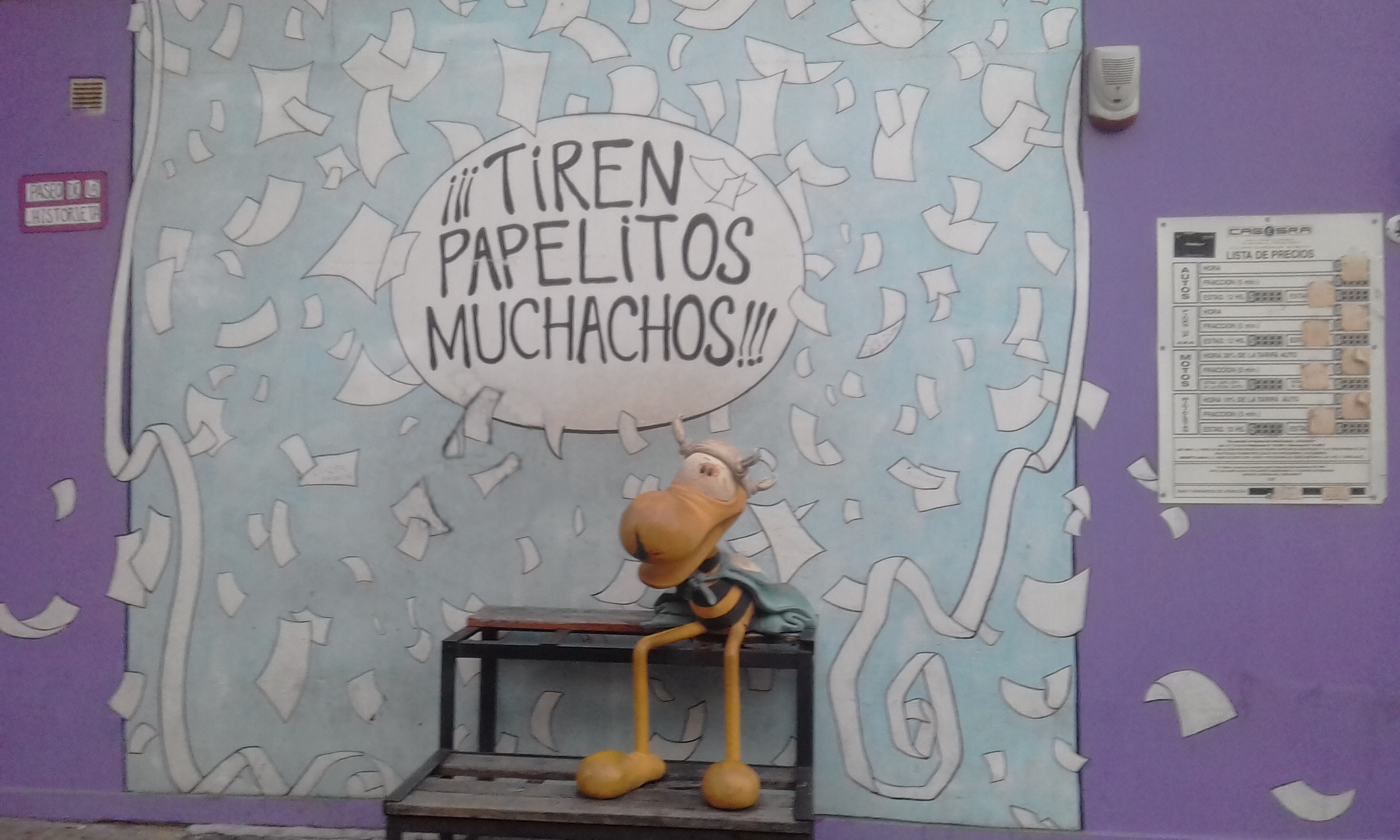
- Sculpture of Clemente at Paseo de la Historieta in Buenos Aires. Inside the speech bubble painted on the wall, the caption: "Tiren papelitos, muchachos" (Throw confetti, boys), in reference to the 1978 World Cup incident with José María Muñoz
- First appearance: Bartolo (1973)
- Last appearance: Clarín (2012)
- Created by: Carlos Loiseau (Caloi)

In-universe information
- Gender: Male
- Origin: Argentina

Clemente is a comic book character created on March 8, 1973, by the Argentine cartoonist Carlos Loiseau, better known as Caloi. Clemente was published daily on the humor page of the Buenos Aires newspaper Clarín until September 22, 2012.

He originated as a secondary character in the comic strip Bartolo el maquinista (Bartolo the tram driver). On March 8, 1973, he was introduced as its mascot. Shortly after, the strip was renamed Bartolo and Clemente, and then Clemente and Bartolo, until Bartolo was replaced as the main character, becoming known as Clemente.

== Characteristics ==
It is a creature without wings or arms, covered in horizontal stripes that encircle its body. Originally, the character could be mistaken for a caricatured platypus—in fact, its first line was a bird sound—although later its features, especially its snout, became more rounded.

Clemente is a character who has undergone a psychological evolution throughout his history, starting from the bird-like unconsciousness of the early comics, passing through a childlike or pseudo-childlike stage, until reaching the final personality of the character, who embodies many of the stereotypes of the so-called "street-smart porteño" or "con artist porteño," similar to those attributed to the inhabitants of different capitals of Spanish-speaking countries.

Clemente is a character critical of reality and football (he identifies as a Peronist and a Boca Juniors fan), and he embodies the characteristics of the Argentine man. He lives primarily on olives and occasionally drinks mate. Speaking of olives, during the 1978 World Cup, he had a curious and fictional argument with commentator José María Muñoz about throwing confetti onto the pitch. Muñoz argued that throwing confetti onto the field during matches could cause injuries to the players, and Clemente jokingly suggested throwing olive pits instead.

Since December 1999, with the arrival of color to the back page of Clarín, the strips were colored by María Verónica Ramírez, Caloi's wife.

== Secondary characters ==
In addition to Bartolo, who initially served as the main character before becoming a secondary character and later appearing less frequently, the work features numerous secondary characters.

=== Lovers ===
Clemente has two easily recognizable lovers:

- Mimi: a female canary who lives in a cage and is deeply in love with the protagonist. She is an aristocratic, conservative, and very romantic character.
- La Mulatona: a kind of female Clemente. La Mulatona speaks using Cuban slang.

=== Children ===
Clemente has two children:

- Jacinto: the first to appear, he's always sitting on the ground in a puddle and usually has long philosophical conversations with his father, in which he reaches original and absurd conclusions. He was born from an olive. He's a River Plate fan. He has a nose piercing and uses a pacifier.
- Clementina: Clemente's second daughter, she is also Mimi's daughter but dark-skinned like La Mulatona due to the "mice" that the protagonist had with the latter.

== Guest characters ==
Throughout the comic strip, Clemente has encountered a vast number of characters who appeared in only a few installments, or who appeared sporadically over time. In the early days of the strip, when Clemente and Bartolo visited various dreamlike settings on the tram that spanned several installments, the guest characters were often those they happened to find in those places, although it also happened that these guest characters appeared at a specific point and conversed with Clemente over several strips.

Given the surreal characteristics the character has also possessed throughout his more than 30 years of existence, it wasn't unusual for him to dedicate several episodes to talking to a stone, listening to the conversations of a family of fleas on his back, or even to conversing with an olive that refused to be eaten. In a more humanized way, he also speaks with the marble bust of Sigmund Freud, with a "Clementosaur" (a type of dinosaur that closely resembles Clemente, only with four legs and much larger), or with "Dolinades," who appeared in the late 1980s. "Alexis Dolinades" is an ancient "Greek philosopher" dressed in a tunic who almost always appears to Clemente standing on a column (a "stylite"); in reality, "Dolinades" and the "Clementosaur" seem to be opposing alter egos of Clemente himself.

== Television ==
The character's first appearance as the protagonist on a television program was in the series Clemente, an animated show featuring puppets and the distinctive voice of actor/announcer Pelusa Suero. It aired daily on Canal 13 from 1982 to 1989 and was rebroadcast on various channels. A particularly memorable moment from this series was the appearance, during the 1982 FIFA World Cup in Spain, of the "Cameroon fan," a black Clemente with a bone on his head, representing the then-unknown Cameroonian football fanbase during their first World Cup appearance.

The character's second appearance with his own show, voiced by Pelusa Suero, was in "Clemente", this time using 3D animation and lasted two months in 2002, airing on channel 7 (Argentina).

The character's third and final appearance was in "Clemente," this time he wore a white headband that said "YPF" and a cloak with the colors of the Argentine flag (like Super Clemente). These were also advertisements using 3D animation, broadcast by YPF in 2010 during the South Africa 2010 World Cup.

== Tributes ==
In November 2004, a monument to Clemente, created by sculptor Fernando Rusquellas, was unveiled in the plaza of the same name, designed by architect Marcelo Liendo. The sculpture is located in the city of Adrogué, Greater Buenos Aires, the town where Caloi lived his final years.
