= Davy Lauterbach =

Painter and poet

- Born: May 4, 1972 (age 53)
- Occupation(s): Painter, Poet

Davy Lauterbach (born May 4, 1972) is a painter and poet who also works in the television business. His most notable television credit is as an assistant director on The Simpsons. His other credits include King of the Hill, and Days of Our Lives.

His poetry has been published in the Los Angeles Times, Yale Review, and Base. His paintings have been printed in NYArts, and The Harvard Advocate.

Davy studied English literature at Harvard University and painting at the Rhode Island School of Design.

== Sources ==
- Balk, Alex. "Davy Lauterbach." Radaronline March, 2008.http://www.radaronline.com/features/2008/03/davy_lauterbach_paintings_interview_01.php
- Camacho, Enzo ED. "Davy Lauterbach." Harvard Advocate. Cambridge. Vol 142, No. 1. Fall 2006. (20).
- Noh, David. "In the Noh." "Gay City News." New York. Jan 32, 2009. http://gaycitynews.com/site/news.cfm?newsid=20228932&BRD=2729&PAG=461&dept_id=569330&rfi=6
- Perry, Laura. "Davy Lauterbach." NYArts. New York. Vol 12 No 1/2. Jan/Feb 2007. (118-120).
