= Nicolas Beaucaire =

Swiss actor (1972–2025)

Nicolas Beaucaire (French: [nikɔlɑ bokɛʁ]; 22 September 1972 – 13 August 2025) was a Swiss actor.

== Life and work ==
Beaucaire was born on 22 September 1972 and grew up in La Chaux-de-Fonds, Switzerland. At the age of 20, he left for New York and joined the musical theater school, the Broadway Dance Center. In 1994, he relocated to Paris and joined the Cours Simon.

From 1998 to 1999, he trained at Studio Pygmalion. From 2012 to 2015, he played Father Valery in the multi-award-winning series Ainsi soient-ils. Also in 2012, he played in the feature film Les Saveurs du palais by Christian Vincent and in Capital by Costa-Gavras.

In 2013, he starred in Anthony Marciano's film Les Gamins.

Beaucaire died by suicide on 13 August 2025, at the age of 52, after long suffering from depression.
