= Manuel García Ferré =

Spanish Argentine graphic artist

- García Ferré with a Súper Hijitus action figure.
- Born: October 8, 1929; Almería, Spain
- Died: March 28, 2013 (aged 83); Buenos Aires, Argentina

Manuel García Ferré (8 October 1929 – 28 March 2013) was a Spanish Argentine animation director and cartoonist.

== Biography ==
García Ferré was born in Almería, Spain, in 1929. He arrived in Argentina in 1947, and worked for advertising agencies while studying architecture. In 1952 his character Pi Pío was accepted and published by the important magazine Billiken. In 1964 he created Anteojito, a children's magazine which at its height in the 1970s, had a circulation of 300,000 copies.

As director of his own animation studio, García Ferré created numerous animated TV series and films. The most influential of these was Hijitus, aired between 1967 and 1974 on Channel 13. The first animated television series in Argentina, Hijitus was also aired elsewhere in the region and became the most successful television series of its kind in Latin America. He managed Anteojito magazine until its last issue in 2002, and from 1985 to 2007 he was editor of another publication, Muy Interesante.

García Ferré was declared an Illustrious Citizen of Buenos Aires by the City Legislature in 2009.

== Films ==
- Mil intentos y un invento (September 14, 1972) - writer, director
- Trapito (July 17, 1975) - writer, director
- Ico, el caballito valiente (July 9, 1987) - writer, director
- Manuelita (July 8, 1999) - writer, director
- Corazón, las alegrías de Pantriste (July 6, 2000) - writer, director
- Soledad y Larguirucho (July 5, 2012) - writer, director

== Related links ==
- Once Upon a Time...Man (this appeared in his books about Petete)
