= Billiken (magazine) =

Argentine children's magazine, established in 1919

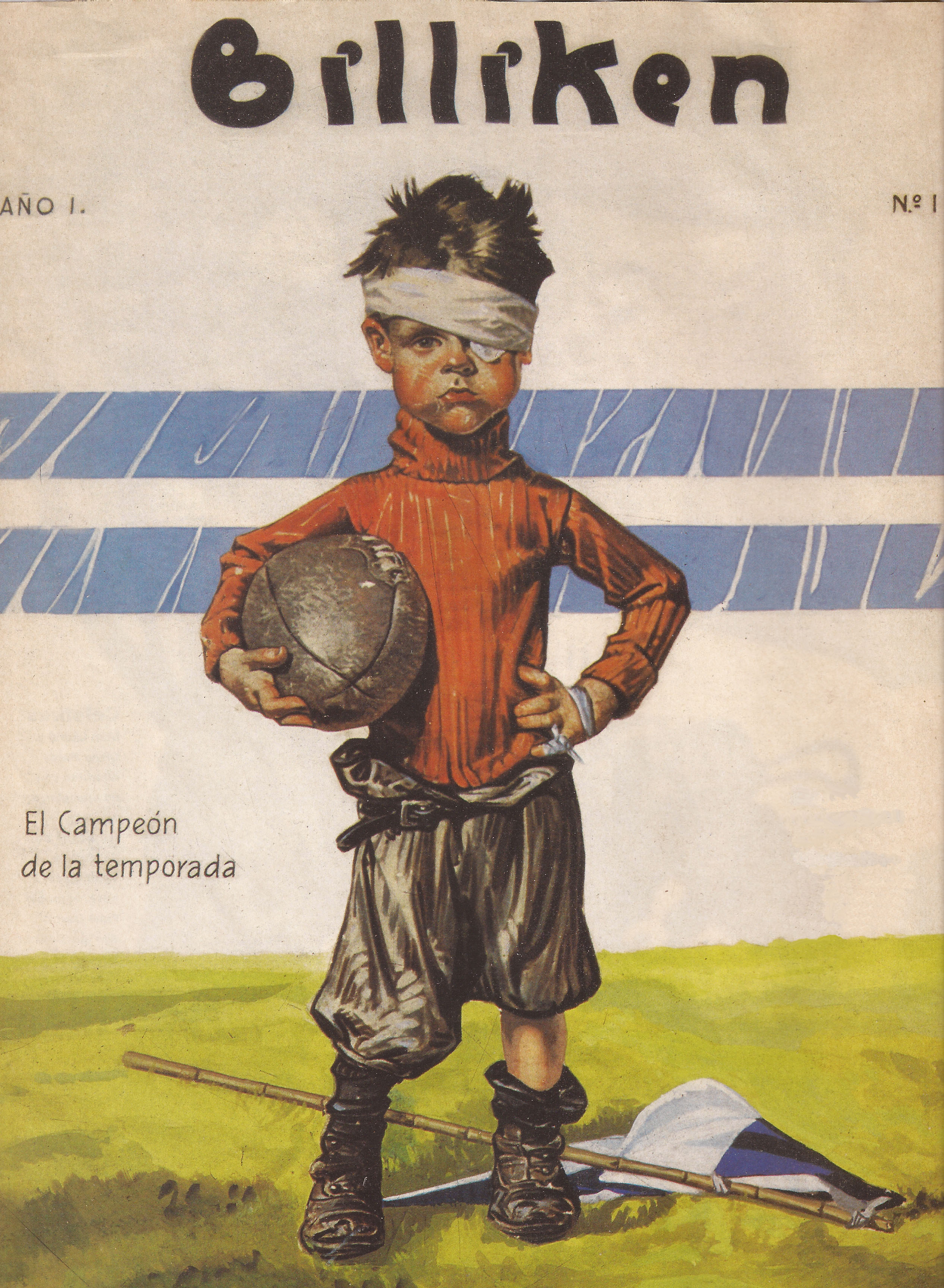
- Cover of Billiken #1, 1919
- Editor: Euhen Matarozzo
- Categories: Children's magazine
- Frequency: Weekly
- Publisher: Editorial Atlántida S.A.
- First issue: November 17, 1919; 106 years ago
- Company: Grupo Atlántida
- Country: Argentina
- Based in: Buenos Aires
- Language: Spanish
- Website: billiken.lat
- ISSN: 2684-0200

Billiken is a children's content brand, originally a magazine published in Buenos Aires, Argentina once a week, being the oldest Spanish language magazine for young people. It was created by the Uruguayan journalist Constancio C. Vigil and its first issue appeared on November 17 of 1919.

The magazine was scheduled from weekly to monthly in 2018. It was last published in November 2019, continuing as an online platform since then.

== History ==
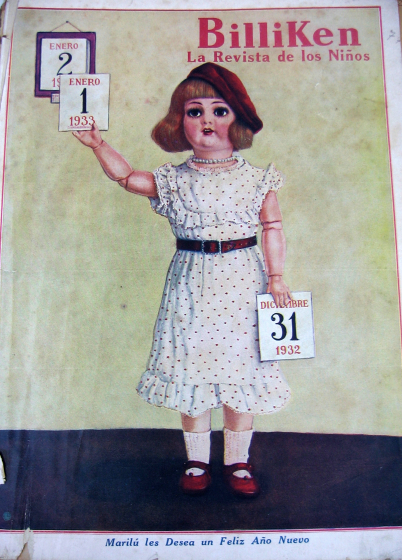
Cover of Billiken celebrating New Year 1933 and featuring the Marilú doll the magazine sold

Billiken was founded by Constancio C. Vigil, a Uruguayan-born journalist who also founded El Gráfico. Its current director is Euhen Matarozzo. The first edition of the magazine appeared on November 17, 1919. One of the cartoonists that worked for Billiken was Manuel García Ferré, with his character Pi Pío.

The name Billiken is taken from a popular charm doll of the time, a smiling character created in 1908 by the American art teacher and illustrator Florence Pretz. To Constancio C. Vigil, who was looking for a title for his unpublished children's magazine, it seemed like a good idea to use the name of a doll that Argentine children believed could bring you good luck.

The cover of issue No. 1 had a boy with a football under his right arm, and a bandage on his head that covered his left eye. This image of the disheveled "neighborhood child" was the emblem of the magazine for several decades. The illustration was taken from a cover of The Saturday Evening Post, published five years earlier, by J. C. Leyendecker.

Billiken has its headquarters in Buenos Aires. The publisher of the magazine was Editorial Atlántida S.A. The magazine was aimed at school-age children and contained a mixture of games, stories, cartoons and news about movies, music and celebrities. Characters made popular in the magazine include 'The Travelling Ant', 'Marta and Jorge' and 'Misia Pepa'.

As a print magazine, Billiken was widely available in Uruguay, Argentina and other South American countries. In 1958, it became the first magazine in Spanish to sell 500,000 copies in a week.

The weekly circulation of Billiken was 58,816 copies in 2010, 54,373 copies in 2011 and 54,064 copies in 2012.

== Controversy ==
In August 1978, the magazine asked its readers to send postcards abroad that defended the National Reorganization Process from criticism of the human rights violations that were being committed. These postcards had been published in Editorial Atlántida's women's magazine, Para Ti which was consistently supportive of the military dictatorship.
