= 1970 in animation =

Events in 1970 in animation.

== Events ==
=== April ===
- April 7:
  - 42nd Academy Awards: It's Tough to Be a Bird by Ward Kimball wins the Academy Award for Best Animated Short.
  - The first episode of The Adventures of Hutch the Honeybee is broadcast.

=== September ===
- September 12:
  - The first episode of Harlem Globetrotters is broadcast.
  - The first episode of Josie and the Pussycats is broadcast.

=== October ===
- October 9: Karel Zeman's On the Comet premieres.

=== November ===
- November 7: Chuck Jones, Abe Levitow and Dave Monahan's The Phantom Tollbooth is first released two years after completion due to internal problems with MGM Animation/Visual Arts, which was closed down a month after the release. Norton Juster expressed his intensive disapproval with the adaptation and declaring the film's positive reviews to be "unacceptable".
- November 9: The first episode of Colargol is broadcast, produced by Albert Barillé.

=== December ===
- December 24: The Walt Disney Company releases The Aristocats, directed by Wolfgang Reitherman.

=== Specific date unknown ===
- Prescott Wright produces the first International Tournée of Animation.
- Ngô Mạnh Lân releases Tale of Gióng the Saint.

== Films released ==
- January 28 - Aladdin and His Magic Lamp (France)
- February 15 - Uncle Sam Magoo (United States)
- March 17:
  - Nobody's Boy (Japan)
  - Tiger Mask (Japan)
- March 21:
  - Attack No.1: The Movie (Japan)
  - Star of the Giants: Big League Ball (Japan)
- April 7 - The Mad, Mad, Mad Comedians (United States)
- June 26 - Shinbone Alley (United States)
- July 19:
  - 30,000 Miles Under the Sea (Japan)
  - Tiger Mask: War Against the League of Masked Wrestlers (Japan)
- August 1:
  - Attack No.1: Revolution (Japan)
  - Star of the Giants: The Fateful Showdown (Japan)
- September 15 - Cleopatra (Japan)
- November 1 - Tales of Washington Irving (United States and Australia)
- November 7:
  - The Phantom Tollbooth (United States)
  - Santa and the Three Bears (United States)
- November 26 - A Connecticut Yankee in King Arthur's Court (Australia)
- December 14 - Santa Claus Is Comin' to Town (United States)
- December 19 - Attack No.1: World Championship (Japan)
- December 23 - Dougal and the Blue Cat (France)
- December 24 – The Aristocats (United States)

== Television series ==
=== Debuts ===
- March 30 - Itazura Tenshi Chippo-Chan debuts on Fuji TV.
- April 1 - Ashita no Joe debuts on Fuji TV.
- April 3 - Dôbutsu Mura Monogatari debuts in syndication.
- April 5 - Otanoshimi Anime Gekijô debuts on Fuji TV and Studio Zero.
- April 6 - The Adventures of Parsley debuts on BBC One.
- April 7 - The Adventures of Hutch the Honeybee debuts on Fuji TV.
- April 13 - Akaki Chi no Eleven debuts on Nippon TV.
- June 10 - Nihon Tanjô debuts on Nippon TV.
- July 1 - Where's Huddles? debuts on CBS.
- August 1 - Manga Jinbutsushi debuts in syndication.
- September 12:
  - Doctor Dolittle, Groovie Goolies, Harlem Globetrotters, Josie and the Pussycats, and Sabrina and the Groovie Goolies debut on CBS.
  - The Reluctant Dragon and Mr. Toad Show and Will the Real Jerry Lewis Please Sit Down debut on ABC.
- September 28 - Otoko Do Ahô! Kôshien debuts on Nippon TV.
- October 2 - Kick no Oni debuts on TBS.
- October 3 - Ijiwaru Bā-san debuts in syndication.
- October 4 - Inakappe Taishô debuts in syndication.
- October 5 - Norakuro debuts on Fuji TV.
- October 7 - Warera Salary man Dô debuts on Fuji TV.
- November 1 - Famous Classic Tales debuts on CBS.
- November 2 - Mahō no Mako-chan debuts on TV Asahi.
- November 9 - Colargol debuts on ORTF.
- Specific date unknown - The Tomfoolery Show debuts in syndication.

== Births ==
=== January ===
- January 1: Cydney Trent, American dancer, dance instructor, and actress (voice of Petunia Rhubarb in VeggieTales).
- January 11: Malcolm D. Lee, American film producer, screenwriter and director (Space Jam: A New Legacy).
- January 13: Keith Coogan, American actor (voice of young Tod in The Fox and the Hound).
- January 17:
  - Genndy Tartakovsky, Russian-American animator (2 Stupid Dogs, The Critic, The Powerpuff Girls), director (Hotel Transylvania) and cartoonist (creator of Dexter's Laboratory, Samurai Jack, Sym-Bionic Titan, Primal, and Unicorn: Warriors Eternal).
  - Moneca Stori, Canadian voice actress (voice of Kagome Higurashi in Inuyasha, Laura Haruna in Hamtaro, Sally Po and Catherine Bloom in Mobile Suit Gundam Wing).
- January 20:
  - Kerri Kenney-Silver, American actress (voice of Miriam in Harvey Beaks, Gravitina in Buzz Lightyear of Star Command, Electronica in Teamo Supremo, Lotte Eccleston in the Digman! episode "Fear of GAWD", Gaia in the Hercules episode "Hercules and the Prince of Thrace").
  - Larry Schwarz, American animation producer, entrepreneur, writer and photographer (creator of Princess Natasha, Kappa Mikey, Ellen's Acres, Speed Racer: The Next Generation, Three Delivery and Dancing Sushi, founder of Animation Collective).
- January 24: Matthew Lillard, American actor (voice of Eko in Karas: The Prophecy, Bruce and Mars in American Dad!, Jason Burr in Beware the Batman, Ned in All Hail King Julien, Lizard King in Axel: The Biggest Little Hero, Trevor Bodie in The Replacements episode "Skate-Gate", Monsieur Ducat in the Eloise: The Animated Series episode "Little Miss Christmas", Surge in the Generator Rex episode "Wasteland", continued voice of Shaggy Rogers in the Scooby-Doo franchise).
- January 31: Minnie Driver, English-American actress and singer (voice of Jane Porter in Tarzan, Lady Eboshi in Princess Mononoke, Brooke Shields in South Park: Bigger, Longer & Uncut, Debby Devizo in SuperMansion, Annie in Jurassic World Camp Cretaceous, Penguin in the Batman: Caped Crusader episode "In Treacherous Waters").

=== February ===
- February 3: Anthony Russo, American film director, producer, screenwriter and brother of Joe Russo (voice of Movie Executive #2 in The Simpsons episode "Bart the Bad Guy").
- February 12: Judd Winick, American cartoonist, comic book writer, television producer and screenwriter (Batman: Under the Red Hood, The Awesomes, creator of The Life and Times of Juniper Lee).
- February 14: Simon Pegg, English actor, screenwriter and comedian (voice of Buck in the Ice Age franchise, Kieron the Cat and Simmons in I Am Not an Animal, Odd in Free Jimmy, Thompson in The Adventures of Tintin, Herbert Trubshaw in The Boxtrolls, Pitch Kickham in Randy Cunningham: 9th Grade Ninja, the Narrator in Room on the Broom, Chamberlain in The Dark Crystal: Age of Resistance, Aleister in Archer, King James in America: The Motion Picture, Bob in Luck, C-3PO in the Phineas and Ferb episode "Phineas and Ferb: Star Wars", Dengar in the Star Wars: The Clone Wars episode "Bounty", Hughie in The Boys Presents: Diabolical episode "I'm Your Pusher").
- February 18: Susan Egan, American actress, singer and dancer (voice of Megara in the Hercules franchise and House of Mouse, Lin in Spirited Away, Gina in Porco Rosso, Rose Quartz and Pink Diamond in Steven Universe, Renne Frodgers in the Amphibia episode "A Caravan Named Desire", "You'll Never Sleep Again" Singer and Singing Tree in The Simpsons episodes "Treehouse of Horror XXXII" and "Meat Is Murder").
- February 20: Vincent Paronnaud, French filmmaker (Persepolis).
- February 22: Nicole Oliver, Canadian actress (voice of Princess Celestia and Cheerilee in My Little Pony: Friendship Is Magic, Zoe Trent in Littlest Pet Shop, the Sorceress of Castle Grayskull and Queen Marlena in He-Man and the Masters of the Universe).

=== March ===
- March 3: Julie Bowen, American actress (voice of Queen Arianna in Rapunzel's Tangled Adventure, Lieutenant Penumbra in DuckTales, Devon Albright in Scooby-Doo! Mecha Mutt Menace, Lil' Dipper in Planes: Fire & Rescue, Aresia in the Justice League episode "Fury", Marion Spartan in the Scooby-Doo! Mystery Incorporated episode "Attack of the Headless Horror", Patricia Banks in Hailey's On It!, herself and Claire Dunphy in Family Guy).
- March 10: Erin Bozon, American video game designer and animator (Futurama, Baby Blues).
- March 13: Tim Story, American filmmaker (Tom & Jerry).
- March 14: Meredith Salenger, American actress (voice of Barriss Offee in Star Wars: The Clone Wars, Lashina in DC Super Hero Girls, Supergirl in Teen Titans Go! To the Movies, Aurora Six in Super Robot Monkey Team Hyperforce Go!, Clear Sky in the My Little Pony: Friendship Is Magic episode "Common Ground").
- March 15: Qarie Marshall, American actor (additional voices in the Drawn Together episode "Lost in Parking Space, Part Two").
- March 18:
  - Queen Latifah, American musician and actress (voice of Ellie in the Ice Age franchise, Gran Bruja in Maya and the Three, Pam Dromeda in The Fairly OddParents episode "Crash Nebula", herself in The Critic episode "Lady Hawke").
  - Shane Jacobson, Australian actor (voice of Shane in Thomas & Friends and Santa Claus in Santa's Apprentice).
- March 20:
  - Michael Rapaport, American actor and comedian (voice of Squirt, Squeak, Tony and Plumber in Pound Puppies, Mike Wegman in The Simpsons, Erik in the Animals episode "Rats.").
  - Andrew Kishino, Canadian actor (voice of Janja in The Lion Guard, Kevin in Steven Universe, Saw Gerrera in Star Wars: The Clone Wars and Star Wars: The Bad Batch, Fong and Sid in Teenage Mutant Ninja Turtles, Daniel Kon in Jurassic World Camp Cretaceous, Storm Shadow and Frostbite in G.I. Joe: Renegades, Mantis and Jax-Ur in Young Justice).
  - Linda Larkin, American actress (voice of Jasmine in the Aladdin franchise, Hercules, House of Mouse, Disney Princess Enchanted Tales: Follow Your Dreams, Sofia the First, and Ralph Breaks the Internet).
- March 23: Krzysztof Banaszyk, Polish actor (Polish dub voice of Gambit in X-Men: Evolution, D.J. Drake in Looney Tunes: Back in Action, Ethan Bennett in The Batman, Li Shang in Mulan II, Hulk in The Super Hero Squad Show), (d. 2024).
- March 24: Vincent Mason, American musician and member of De La Soul (voiced himself in the Teen Titans Go! episode "Don't Press Play").
- March 28: Vince Vaughn, American actor (voice of Chet Stevenson in F is for Family, Loki in the Hercules episode "Hercules and the Twilight of the Gods").

=== April ===
- April 1: Brad Meltzer, American author and comic book writer (creator of Xavier Riddle and the Secret Museum).
- April 4: Janice Kawaye, American voice actress (voice of Gi in Captain Planet and the Planeteers, Jenny Wakeman in My Life as a Teenage Robot, Ami in Hi Hi Puffy AmiYumi, Yuzu Kurosaki in Bleach, Numbuh 83 and 84 in Codename: Kids Next Door).
- April 6: Jen Kamerman, American animator (The Simpsons, The Oblongs), storyboard artist, background artist, sheet timer and director (The Simpsons).
- April 8: Steve Daye, Canadian animator (Nelvana, Space Jam), storyboard artist (Nelvana, Nickelodeon Animation Studio, Wow! Wow! Wubbzy!, Slacker Cats, Jimmy Two-Shoes, Dinosaur Train, Julius Jr., Pirate Express, Barbie: Life in the Dreamhouse, If You Give a Mouse a Cookie, Trailer Park Boys: The Animated Series, Chip and Potato), writer (Wow! Wow! Wubbzy!) and director (Wow! Wow! Wubbzy!, Doodlebops Rockin' Road Show, Little People, Inspector Gadget, 9 Story Media Group).
- April 12: Retta, American actress and comedian (voice of Pinky's Mother in Pinky Malinky, Magic Harp in DuckTales, Wizard Nightingale in Where's Waldo?, Sandy in the Duncanville episode "Das Banana Boot", Animal Control Officer in the Bob's Burgers episode "The (Raccoon) King and I", Ghost's Mother in The Boys Presents: Diabolical episode "An Animated Short Where Pissed-Off Supers Kill Their Parents").
- April 20: Shemar Moore, American actor (voice of Cyborg in the DC Animated Movie Universe).
- April 21:
  - Glen Hansard, Irish musician and actor (voice of Irish Guy in The Simpsons episode "In the Name of the Grandfather"), (d. 2026).
  - Nicole Sullivan, American actress and comedian (voice of Shego in Kim Possible, Mira Nova in Buzz Lightyear of Star Command, Joan of Arc in Clone High, Supergirl in Super Best Friends Forever and DC Super Hero Girls, Drew Saturday in The Secret Saturdays, Franny Robinson in Meet the Robinsons, Marlene in The Penguins of Madagascar, Muriel Goldman in Family Guy).
  - Rob Riggle, American actor and comedian (voice of Aloysius O'Hare in The Lorax, Doug Clancy in Fancy Nancy, Chet Butler in The Cleveland Show, Blue Falcon in the Jellystone! episode "Heroes and Capes", himself in The Proud Family: Louder and Prouder episode "Get In").
- April 22: Mireille Soria, American film producer (DreamWorks Animation).
- April 25: Jason Lee, American actor (voice of Syndrome in The Incredibles, Bones in Monster House, Charlie in We Bare Bears).
- April 29: Master P, American rapper and record executive (composed the third theme of Static Shock, voice of Nick's Friend in the Robot Chicken episode "President Evil").

=== May ===
- May 1: Dave Willis, American television producer, director, and writer (Aqua Teen Hunger Force, Squidbillies, Space Ghost Coast to Coast, Your Pretty Face Is Going to Hell) and actor (voice of Meatwad and Carl Brutananadilewski in Aqua Teen Hunger Force, Glenn and Deputy Denny in Squidbillies, Cyclo in Space Ghost Coast to Coast, Krampus in Your Pretty Face Is Going to Hell, Barry Dylan in Archer, Rhoda in 12 Oz. Mouse, Leto Otel in Ballmastrz: 9009, Andy DeMayo in Steven Universe).
- May 3: Bobby Cannavale, American actor (voice of Frankie in The Nut Job 2: Nutty by Nature, Valiente in Ferdinand, Spike in Tom & Jerry, Jimmy Crystal in Sing 2, Vance Waggoner in BoJack Horseman, Gavin the Hormone Monster and Nick's Agent in Big Mouth, Tony in the SpongeBob SquarePants episode "Shell Games", Chaz Migliaccio in the American Dad! episode "Cops and Roger").
- May 4: Will Arnett, Canadian-American actor and comedian (voice of the title character in BoJack Horseman, Slade in Teen Titans Go! To the Movies, Missing Link in Monsters vs. Aliens, Batman in The Lego Movie franchise, Lone Gunslinger in Ice Age: The Meltdown, Karl Horst in Ratatouille, Vlad Vladikoff in Horton Hears a Who!, Mr. Perkins in Despicable Me, Pod in The Secret World of Arrietty, Surly in The Nut Job 2: Nutty by Nature, Steve in Rumble, Sweet Pete in Chip 'n Dale: Rescue Rangers, Ghost Writer in Danny Phantom, Portis in King of the Hill, Ryder in Wander Over Yonder, General Richter in The Cleveland Show, Deputy Director Gratman in The Simpsons).
- May 9: Helen Hill, American activist, writer, teacher, film director and animator (Scratch and Crow, The Florestine Collection), (d. 2007).
- May 11: Nicky Katt, American actor (voice of Leland Lizard in The Get Along Gang, Artist in the King of the Hill episode "Cecil N'est Pas Une King of the Hill" and Dr. Brown in the episode "The Incredible Hank"), (d. 2025).
- May 12: Bill Thyen, American animator (Quest for Camelot, The Iron Giant, Eight Crazy Nights), storyboard artist (The Wacky Adventures of Ronald McDonald, Curious George, Arthur's Missing Pal, Wow! Wow! Wubbzy!, Unstable Fables, Dinosaur Train, G.I. Joe: Renegades, Norm of the North: Keys to the Kingdom) and background artist (Dilbert, The Cleveland Show, Bordertown, Family Guy, Milo Murphy's Law, The Simpsons).
- May 18: Tina Fey, American actress and comedian (voice of 22 in Soul, Giant Burrito in Aqua Teen Hunger Force Colon Movie Film for Theaters, Lisa in Ponyo, Roxanne Ritchi in Megamind, Annabelle in the Phineas and Ferb episode "Run Candace Run", Mrs. Cantwell in The Simpsons episode "Black Eyed, Please", The Advocate in the pilot episode of The Awesomes).
- May 25:
  - Michael Benyaer, Canadian-American actor (voice of Kaz Takagi in Exosquad, Bob in ReBoot, Hadji Singh in The Real Adventures of Jonny Quest, Dr. Wehunt in the Love, Death & Robots episode "Sucker of Souls").
  - Octavia Spencer, American actress (voice of Corey the Manticore in Onward, Mrs. Otterton in Zootopia, Shonteeva in the American Dad! episode "For Black Eyes Only").
  - Satsuki Yukino, Japanese voice actress (voice of Milly Thompson in Trigun, Kagome Higurashi in Inuyasha, Yoruichi Shihoin in Bleach).
- May 30: Joseph Daniello, American animator, storyboard artist (Extreme Ghostbusters, The Lion King II: Simba's Pride, Nickelodeon Animation Studio, Free for All, The Lion King 1½, Game Over, Ozzy & Drix, Jackie Chan Adventures, American Dad!, Family Guy, Curious George) and director (American Dad!).

=== June ===
- June 1: Andrea Fay Friedman, American actress (voice of Ellen in the Family Guy episode "Extra Large Medium"), (d. 2023).
- June 2: B-Real, American rapper and member of Cypress Hill (voice of one of the Baby Singers in The Rugrats Movie, Alex in the TripTank episode "Green Out", himself in The Simpsons episode "Homerpalooza").
- June 4: Alice Tsay-Park, American background artist (Nickelodeon Animation Studio).
- June 7: Dean DeBlois, Canadian film director, producer, screenwriter and animator (Lilo & Stitch, How to Train Your Dragon).
- June 15: Justin Fletcher, English actor, comedian, singer and television presenter (voice of Whiz in the UK dub of Make Way for Noddy, various characters in Boo! and Timmy Time, Pickle in the UK dub of ToddWorld, the title character, Timmy and Pidsley in Shaun the Sheep, the title character in Olly the Little White Van, additional voices in Chop Socky Chooks).
- June 16: Steven Fonti, American animator, storyboard artist (I Am Weasel, SpongeBob SquarePants, The Powerpuff Girls, Osmosis Jones, Eight Crazy Nights, Futurama, Father of the Pride, Pooh's Heffalump Movie, Family Guy, Over the Hedge, American Dad!, The Simpsons, Brickleberry, Sony Pictures Animation, Space Jam: A New Legacy, Green Eggs and Ham) and writer (SpongeBob SquarePants, The Powerpuff Girls).
- June 17: Will Forte, American actor, comedian, screenwriter and producer (voice of Abraham Lincoln in Clone High, The Lego Movie, The Lego Movie 2: The Second Part, and America: The Motion Picture, Chester V in Cloudy with a Chance of Meatballs 2, Shaggy Rogers in Scoob!, Stuart Proszakian in Sit Down, Shut Up, Joe Towne in Cloudy with a Chance of Meatballs, Principal Wally Farquhare in The Cleveland Show, Chipper in The Life & Times of Tim, Tom Treebow in Squidbillies, Ian, Stuart Rossmyre and Sid Lampis in Allen Gregory, Tyler Cutebiker in Gravity Falls, Kurt and Mr. Grant in Bob's Burgers, Malocchio Jr. in The Awesomes, King Toot in The Simpsons, Cody in Get Squirrely, Rad Cunningham in Moonbeam City, Mr. Paul in My Life as a Courgette, Nag in Luis & the Aliens, Tim Willoughby in The Willoughbys, Dawa in Hoops, Wolf Tobin in The Great North, Dirk in No Activity, Shel in HouseBroken).
- June 22: Richard Yearwood, Canadian actor (voice of Budge in Growing Up Creepie, Donkey Kong in Donkey Kong Country, Paul in Dinosaucers, additional voices in Monster Force).
- June 26:
  - Nick Offerman, American actor, writer, and comedian (voice of Metalbeard in The Lego Movie franchise, Varvatos Vex in 3Below: Tales of Arcadia and Trollhunters: Rise of the Titans, the title character in Axe Cop, Agent Powers in Gravity Falls, Beef Tobin in The Great North).
  - Sean Hayes, American actor (voice of Terri in Monsters University, Pete the Guard in Rapunzel's Tangled Adventure, Steve Maryweather in Q-Force).
- June 30: Brian Bloom, American actor and screenwriter (voice of Captain America in The Avengers: Earth's Mightiest Heroes, Captain Atom, Creeper, Iron, and Oxygen in Batman: The Brave and the Bold, Rumble McSkirmish in Gravity Falls, Captain Ryan, Captain Dash Coolstar, Cyberoid X, Cronard, and Muurg in Teenage Mutant Ninja Turtles, Hyperion in Avengers Assemble).

=== July ===
- July 3: Audra McDonald, American actress (voice of Mother Superior in BoJack Horseman, Itty Bitty Bess in the Doc McStuffins episode "Itty Bitty Bess Takes Flight", Ashley in the Central Park episode "A Fish Called Snakehead").
- July 7: Andrea Baker, American actress (voice of Clover and Dominique in Totally Spies!).
- July 8: Beck, American musician, singer, songwriter and record producer (voiced himself in the Futurama episode "Bendin' in the Wind").
- July 13: Bruno Salomone, French actor (voice of Nico in A Cat in Paris, Felix's father in Santa's Apprentice, Albert in A Monster in Paris, Karl in Yellowbird, Manole in Marona's Fantastic Tale, French dub voice of Syndrome in The Incredibles, Zoc in The Ant Bully, Rick in Happily N'Ever After), (d. 2026).
- July 14: Mike McFarland, American voice actor (English dub voice of Master Roshi in the Dragon Ball franchise, Jean Havoc in Fullmetal Alchemist, Buggy the Clown in One Piece, provided additional voices for Pokémon), director (Attack on Titan, Dragon Ball), screenwriter (Marvel Future Avengers, Fullmetal Alchemist), and producer (One Piece), (d. 2026).
- July 21: Carlos Díaz, Chilean-born Canadian actor (voice of Mr. Sparks in Hero Elementary, Lorenzo and Rock in Total Drama Presents: The Ridonculous Race, Johnny in Franny's Feet, Raymundo in The Save-Ums!, Tiger Shark in The Avengers: United They Stand episode "Command Decision").
- July 23: Kenji Nomura, Japanese actor (voice of Mitsunori Kugayama in Genshiken, Lorenzo in Ristorante Paradiso, Gilles de Rais in Drifters, Yadokhan and Isohgin in Yes! PreCure 5, dub voice of Bomb in The Angry Birds Movie and The Angry Birds Movie 2, Bloat in Finding Nemo and Finding Dory, Ken in Bee Movie, Missing Link in Monsters vs. Aliens, Captain Qwark in Ratchet & Clank, Jefferson Davis in Spider-Man: Into the Spider-Verse, and Lex Luthor in the DC Animated Universe).
- July 25: Guilherme Briggs, Brazilian actor (dub voice of the title characters in Freakazoid! and Samurai Jack, Buzz Lightyear in the Toy Story franchise, Cosmo in The Fairly OddParents, Gabriel Agreste in Miraculous: Tales of Ladybug & Cat Noir, Superman in Superman: The Animated Series, and various other DC series, King Julien in the Madagascar franchise, Daggett in The Angry Beavers, Moses in The Prince of Egypt, Him in The Powerpuff Girls, Yoda in Star Wars: The Clone Wars, Dimitri in Anastasia, Otis in Back at the Barnyard, Barry B. Benson in Bee Movie, Kronk in The Emperor's New Groove franchise, Doctor Doom in Fantastic Four: World's Greatest Heroes, Coop in Megas XLR, Mickey Mouse in Mickey Mouse Clubhouse, Dojo Kanojo Cho in Xiaolin Showdown).

=== August ===
- August 2: Kevin Smith, American filmmaker, actor, comedian, comic book writer, author, YouTuber, and podcaster (voice of Silent Bob in Clerks: The Animated Series and Jay & Silent Bob's Super Groovy Cartoon Movie!, Moose in Doogal, Grumpy Man in Superman: Doomsday, Goatman and Pigboy in Masters of the Universe: Revelation, Boobie Face in The Boys Presents: Diabolical episode "An Animated Short Where Pissed-Off Supes Kill Their Parents", Hal Jordan in the Duck Dodgers episode "The Green Loontern", Clive Addison in the Phineas and Ferb episode "Nerds of a Feather", himself in Jay & Silent Bob's Super Groovy Cartoon Movie, Teen Titans: The Judas Contract, and The Simpsons episode "Highway to Well").
- August 4: John August, American screenwriter, director, producer, and novelist (Titan A.E., Corpse Bride, Frankenweenie).
- August 7: Dan Vebber, American television writer and producer (Space Ghost Coast to Coast, Daria, Futurama, American Dad!, The Simpsons, Napoleon Dynamite, Bordertown).
- August 9: Thomas Lennon, American actor and screenwriter (voice of Mr. Davenport in The Ghost and Molly McGee, Top Cat in Jellystone!, Wizard Whitebeard in Where's Waldo?, Chuck in Bob's Burgers, Clinton Coot in Legend of the Three Caballeros, Brian in Goldie & Bear, Munk in Dawn of the Croods, Atlas in Hercules, Paper in Rock Paper Scissors, Amazo in the Justice League Action episode "Boo-ray for Bizarro").
- August 10: Charlie Bean, American filmmaker, animator, storyboard artist, and voice actor (The Lego Ninjago Movie, Tron: Uprising, Cartoon Network Studios).
- August 16: Anthony Anderson, American actor and comedian (voice of Pegwheel in Blaze and the Monster Machines, Bill Stork in Hoodwinked!, Zach in The Star, Stanley in the Doc McStuffins episode "Welcome to McStuffinsville").
- August 17: Mike Gasaway, American animator, director, and producer (Nickelodeon Animation Studio).
- August 18: Malcolm-Jamal Warner, American actor (voice of The Producer in The Magic School Bus, Lieutenant Scruffy in The Chicken Squad, Henry in the Adventures from the Book of Virtues episode "Faith", Lester Biggs in the Static Shock episode "Duped", Robber in the Stripperella episode "The Bridesmaid", Braden's Dad in the Special Agent Oso episode "The Living Holiday Lights"), (d. 2025).
- August 19: Fat Joe, American rapper (voice of Seymour in Happy Feet, DJ in Fearless).
- August 21: Marc Evan Jackson, American actor and comedian (voice of Bradford Buzzard in DuckTales, Mr. F in Adventure Time, Anton in the Central Park episode "Squirrel, Interrupted").
- August 24: Jonathan Gebhart, American animator and storyboard artist (The Simpsons, Family Guy).
- August 25: Claudia Schiffer, German model and actress (voiced herself in the Futurama episode "A Head in the Polls").
- August 26: Melissa McCarthy, American actress (voice of DNAmy in Kim Possible, Calvin in The Simpsons episode "Step Brother from the Same Planet").
- August 27: Cathy Weseluck, Canadian actress (voice of Spike and Mayor Mare in My Little Pony: Friendship Is Magic, Buttercream in Littlest Pet Shop, Near in Death Note, Shampoo in Ranma ½, Kagome's Mother in Inuyasha, the title character in Cybersix).

=== September ===
- September 3: Maria Bamford, American actress (voice of Shriek Dubois in CatDog, "Wacky" Jackie Wackerman in Kick Buttowski: Suburban Daredevil, Kelsey Jannings in BoJack Horseman, Violet and Sally Botsford in WordGirl, Chen in Kung Fu Panda: Legends of Awesomeness, Pema in The Legend of Korra, Duchess in The Adventures of Puss in Boots, Tito the Anxiety Mosquito in Big Mouth and Human Resources, additional voices in Adventure Time and Penn Zero: Part-Time Hero).
- September 7: Tom Everett Scott, American actor (voice of Milo's Father in Mars Needs Moms, Booster Gold in Batman: The Brave and the Bold and the Justice League Unlimited episode "The Greatest Story Never Told").
- September 8: Rosearik Rikki Simons, American animator, color stylist (Invader Zim, Jackie Chan Adventures), writer and voice actor (voice of GIR and Bloaty in Invader Zim, various characters in Mighty Magiswords).
- September 11:
  - Taraji P. Henson, American actress and singer (voice of Belle Bottom in Minions: The Rise of Gru, Yesss in Ralph Breaks the Internet, Ethel in Ice Age: The Great Egg-Scapade).
  - Ted Leo, American musician (voice of Steg in Steven Universe: The Movie).
- September 17:
  - Jimmy Hayward, Canadian film director (Horton Hears a Who!, Free Birds), screenwriter, and animator.
  - Mark Osborne, American film and television director (Kung Fu Panda, The Little Prince), writer, producer, and animator.
  - Jim Conroy, American actor (voice of various characters in Celebrity Deathmatch, the title character in Kenny the Shark, the title character and other various characters in Fetch! with Ruff Ruffman, Mr. Magoo in Kung-Fu Magoo, Race Announcer in Epic, Capoeira Turtle in Rio 2, Huckleberry Hound, Captain Caveman, Paw Rugg, Yahooey and Bingo in Jellystone!, Ollie Bulb, Duke and Jasper in The Cuphead Show!, Candy Goblin in The Casagrandes episode "Curse of the Candy Goblin", Chuckles in the Action Pack episode "The Crimson Cape Returns", Toothy McSquint and Captain Feathers in the Pinkalicious & Peterrific episode "Pirate Dreamboat", additional voices in Top Cat: The Movie) and television writer (Fetch! with Ruff Ruffman).
- September 18:
  - Gina Shay, American producer (DreamWorks Animation).
  - Aisha Tyler, American actress and television host (voice of Lana Kane in Archer, Millie Tuskmon in Monsters at Work, Sextina Aquafina in BoJack Horseman, Luna in The Boondocks episode "Attack of the Killer Kung-Fu Wolf Bitch", Angela Abar in the Robot Chicken episode "May Cause Random Wolf Attacks").
- September 28:
  - Jo Wyatt, English actress (voice of Wanda in The Queen's Corgi, Meera Bains in Postman Pat: The Movie, Tweak in Octonauts, Pearl in Spirit of the Forest).
  - Bob Persichetti, American filmmaker, animator, and storyboard artist (Spider-Man: Into the Spider-Verse, Spider-Man: Beyond the Spider-Verse, DreamWorks Animation, Walt Disney Animation Studios).
- September 30: Tony Hale, American actor and comedian (voice of Forky in the Toy Story franchise, Ross, Cyrus, and Mime Bird in The Angry Birds Movie and The Angry Birds Movie 2, Teeny Tiny Tony in Arlo the Alligator Boy and I Heart Arlo, Doctor Psycho in Harley Quinn, Fear in Inside Out 2).

=== October ===
- October 2: Kelly Ripa, American actress, dancer, talk show host, and television producer (voice of Roxanne "Rocky" Ballantine in Batman: Mystery of the Batwoman, Future Bonnie in Kim Possible: A Sitch in Time, Kurrin in Delgo, Nat's Mom in Fly Me to the Moon, the title character in the Duck Dodgers episode "The New Cadet", herself in the Family Guy episode "Viewer Mail #1").
- October 5: Cal Wilson, New Zealand comedian and actress (voice of Petal and Thorn in Kitty Is Not a Cat), (d. 2023).
- October 8: Matt Damon, American actor (voice of Spirit in Spirit: Stallion of the Cimarron, Bill the Krill in Happy Feet Two, Kōichi in Ponyo, Cale in Titan A.E., himself in the Arthur episode "The Making of Arthur").
- October 10: Sergey Gordeyev, Russian animator (Kipper, Baby Blues, Mr. Bean: The Animated Series).
- October 11: Constance Zimmer, American actress (voice of Strongarm in Transformers: Robots in Disguise, Veronica Cale in Wonder Woman: Bloodlines).
- October 12: Cody Cameron, American director, writer, and voice actor (Sony Pictures Animation, DreamWorks Animation).
- October 18: Mike Mitchell, American voice actor, animator (DreamWorks Animation), storyboard artist (Sausage Party), writer (Nightmare Ned, SpongeBob SquarePants, The Barbarian and the Troll), producer and director (Shrek Forever After, Alvin and the Chipmunks: Chipwrecked, Trolls, The Lego Movie 2: The Second Part).
- October 19: Chris Kattan, American actor and comedian (voice of the titular character in Bunnicula, Walter Melon in Aqua Teen Hunger Force Colon Movie Film for Theaters, Filo in Delgo, Polar Penguin in Foodfight!, King Zongo in Jake and the Never Land Pirates).
- October 28: Greg Eagles, American actor, producer and writer (voice of Grim in The Grim Adventures of Billy & Mandy, Bobert in The Amazing World of Gumball, Rusty Bones in Bunnicula, Mackie in Batman: The Dark Knight Returns, Karl in The Real Adventures of Jonny Quest episode "Manhattan Maneater").
- October 29: Michael Daingerfield, Canadian actor (voice of Ace Ventura in Ace Ventura: Pet Detective, Braeburn in My Little Pony: Friendship Is Magic, Patchy in Gigantosaurus, Mr. Dooley in Packages from Planet X, Mr. Gerber in Kid vs. Kat, Unicorn in Iron Man: Armored Adventures, Dionysus in the Class of the Titans episode "Little Box of Horrors", Superman in the Krypto the Superdog episode "Krypto's Scrypto").
- October 30:
  - Tommy Walter, American musician, songwriter and member of Abandoned Pools (performed the theme song of Clone High, and voiced himself in the episode "Changes: The Big Prom: The Sex Romp: The Season Finale").
  - Nia Long, American actress (voice of Roberta Tubbs in season 1 of The Cleveland Show).
- October 31:
  - Nolan North, American actor (voice of Blaze in Blaze and the Monster Machines, Krang in Teenage Mutant Ninja Turtles, Stoick in Dragons: Riders of Berk, Superboy, Superman, Zatara, and Clayface in Young Justice, Cyclops and Colossus in Wolverine and the X-Men).
  - Darin McGowan, American animator, storyboard artist (Klasky Csupo, ¡Mucha Lucha!, The Replacements, Renegade Animation, Sit Down, Shut Up, Futurama, Fish Hooks, Napoleon Dynamite, Tom and Jerry: Santa's Little Helpers, Bordertown, The Loud House Movie, The Snoopy Show), writer (Fish Hooks) and director (Hi Hi Puffy AmiYumi, The Loud House).
  - Rob Letterman, American film director and screenwriter (DreamWorks Animation).

=== November ===
- November 4: Anthony Ruivivar, American actor (voice of Batman in Beware the Batman, Nighthawk in Avengers Assemble).
- November 6: Ethan Hawke, American actor (voice of Batman in Batwheels, Godzilla Junior in the Robot Chicken episode "Squaw Bury Shortcake").
- November 16: Martha Plimpton, American actress (voice of Yelena in Frozen II, Miss Crumbles in Hair High, Briana in Vampirina, the Duchess of Bedazzle in the Doc McStuffins episode "Bedazzled").
- November 18: Mike Epps, American actor and comedian (voice of Boog in Open Season 2, Moe "Mo Gunz" Jackson in The Boondocks episode "Wingmen").
- November 20: Melissa Disney, American voice actress (voice of the title character in As Told by Ginger, Bobbi Summer in Batman Beyond, Mom and Brat in the Justice League Action episode "Nuclear Family Values").
- November 23: Lisa Vischer, American voice actor (voice of Junior Asparagus, Mom Asparagus and other various characters in VeggieTales) and content consultant (VeggieTales, 3-2-1 Penguins!).
- November 24: Oded Fehr, Israeli actor (voice of Doctor Fate in the DC Animated Universe, N'Kantu, the Living Mummy in Ultimate Spider-Man and Hulk and the Agents of S.M.A.S.H., Ra's al Ghul in Young Justice, Equinox in Batman: The Brave and the Bold, Kazim in the American Dad! episode "Stan of Arabia: Part 2").
- November 29: Jason Frederick, Canadian composer (101 Dalmatians II: Patch's London Adventure, Slacker Cats, The Replacements).
- November 30:
  - Johnny Ryan, American alternative comics creator (Pig Goat Banana Cricket, Looney Tunes Cartoons).
  - Walter Emanuel Jones, American actor (voice of Ricky Rogers in Rapsittie Street Kids: Believe in Santa, additional voices in Cloudy with a Chance of Meatballs 2).

=== December ===
- December 1:
  - Sarah Silverman, American comedian, actress and writer (voice of Vanellope von Schweetz in the Wreck-It Ralph franchise, Michelle in Futurama, Cherri in Hair High, Candy Smalls in Santa Inc., Ollie in Bob's Burgers, Amy in the Out There episode "Ace's Wild", Robositter in the Aqua Teen Hunger Force episode "Robositter", Bleh in the Drawn Together episode "The Other Cousin", Stripper in the American Dad! episode "Stan Knows Best", Barb Dunderbarn in the Tom Goes to the Mayor episode "Pipe Camp", herself in the Dr. Katz, Professional Therapist episode "Alderman" and The Simpsons episode "Clown in the Dumps").
  - Dave Cunningham, American animator (The SpongeBob Movie: Sponge Out of Water), storyboard artist (Warner Bros. Animation, Dilbert, Sammy, Zombie College, Futurama, Clifford's Puppy Days, The Simpsons, Jakers! The Adventures of Piggley Winks, Nickelodeon Animation Studio, Maya & Miguel), production assistant (Freakazoid!, The Sylvester & Tweety Mysteries), writer (The Sylvester & Tweety Mysteries) and director (Nickelodeon Animation Studio).
- December 2: Joe Lo Truglio, American actor, comedian, writer and producer (voice of Markowski in Wreck-It Ralph, Ted Logan, Father Beth's Husband and World War II Pilot in Robot Chicken, Gigglepuss and Father Anthony in Animals).
- December 5: Walt Dohrn, American director, writer, and voice actor (DreamWorks Animation, Dexter's Laboratory, SpongeBob SquarePants).
- December 8: Christine Kolosov, American animator (The Problem Solverz, Animation Domination High-Def, China, IL, Moonbeam City), storyboard artist (Turbo Fast, Golan the Insatiable, Home: Adventures with Tip & Oh, Hanazuki: Full of Treasures, The Venture Bros.), art director (Hey Arnold! The Movie), sheet timer (Nickelodeon Animation Studio, Cartoon Network Studios, Maya & Miguel, The Venture Bros.) and director (Nickelodeon Animation Studio, Party Wagon, Metalocalypse, Billy & Mandy's Big Boogey Adventure, Robotomy, The Adventures of OG Sherlock Kush, Turbo Fast).
- December 17: Sean Patrick Thomas, American actor (voice of Mr. Pierre in Middle School Moguls, Marcus Reed in the Static Shock episode "The Usual Suspect").
- December 18: DMX, American rapper and actor (voiced himself in the South Park episode "Chef Aid"), (d. 2021).
- December 19: Lew Morton, American television writer and producer (Futurama, Brickleberry, Family Guy, Beavis and Butt-Head).
- December 24: Keith Silverstein, American actor (voice of Gabriel Agreste in Miraculous: Tales of Ladybug & Cat Noir, Vector the Crocodile in Sonic Boom, Johan Liebert in Monster, Robert E.O. Speedwagon in JoJo's Bizarre Adventure, Hisoka in Hunter × Hunter, Ōgai Mori in Bungo Stray Dogs, Ulric, Brute, and Rascal in Glitter Force).
- December 26: Julia Kalantarova, Uzbekistan-born American background artist (Jumanji, Klasky Csupo, Globehunters: An Around the World in 80 Days Adventure, The Electric Piper, Kid Notorious, Hi Hi Puffy AmiYumi, The Buzz on Maggie, The Simpsons Movie, Christmas Is Here Again, The Goode Family, G.I. Joe: Renegades, American Dad!, Bob's Burgers), (d. 2016).

=== Specific date unknown ===
- Jason Constantine, American film executive (Lionsgate Films), (d. 2025).
- Brett Johnson, American former child actor (voice of Charlie Brown in It's Flashbeagle, Charlie Brown, Snoopy's Getting Married, Charlie Brown and season 2 of The Charlie Brown and Snoopy Show, What's-His-Name in Happily Ever After, second voice of Cavin in Adventures of the Gummi Bears).
- Kevin Manthei, American composer (Warner Bros. Animation, Cartoon Network Studios, Invader Zim, Brandy & Mr. Whiskers, Ultimate Spider-Man, Robot Chicken, Transformers: Robots in Disguise, SuperMansion, Spider-Man, Invader Zim: Enter the Florpus).
- Michele Morgan, American actress (voice of Sharon Hawkins in Static Shock, Juicy Hudson in The PJs, Shaquoya Peterson in The Boondocks episode "Riley Wuz Here").
- Lewis MacLeod, Scottish actor (voice of the title character in Postman Pat, Sebulba in Star Wars Episode I: The Phantom Menace, Mr. Stubborn in The Mr. Men Show, Colin in The Cartoon Cartoon Show episode "Colin Versus the World: Mr. Lounge Lizard").
- Ke Huy Quan, American actor (voice of Gary De'Snake in Zootopia 2, Avatar Xian in Avatar Aang: The Last Airbender, Han in Kung Fu Panda 4).

== Deaths ==
=== February ===
- February 2: Dave Franklin, American songwriter and pianist (co-wrote "The Merry-Go-Round Broke Down" for Looney Tunes), dies at age 74.
- February 22: Edward Selzer, American film producer and publicist (Warner Bros. Cartoons), dies at age 77.

=== April ===
- April 9: Gustaf Tenggren, Swedish-American illustrator and animator (Walt Disney Animation Studios), dies at age 73.
- April 30: Hall Johnson, American composer and choirmaster (voice of the Deacon Crow in Dumbo), dies in an apartment fire at age 82.

=== July ===
- July 7: Charles Tobias, American songwriter (co-wrote the Merrie Melodies theme "Merrily We Roll Along"), dies at age 71.
- July 26: Claud Allister, English actor (voice of Sir Giles in The Reluctant Dragon and Mr. Rat in The Adventures of Ichabod and Mr. Toad), dies at age 81.

=== August ===
- August 13: Dan Gordon, American comics artist, animator, director and screenwriter (Van Beuren Studios, Fleischer Studios, Famous Studios, Hanna-Barbera), dies from liver cancer at age 68.

=== September ===
- September 29: Edward Everett Horton, American character actor (narrator of Fractured Fairy Tales in The Adventures of Rocky and Bullwinkle and Friends), dies at age 84.

=== October ===
- October 2: Lauro Gazzolo, Italian voice actor (dub voice of Bashful in Snow White and the Seven Dwarfs, Dandy (Jim) Crow in Dumbo, the White Rabbit in Alice in Wonderland, Archimedes in The Sword in the Stone, Jock in Lady and the Tramp, Mr. Magoo, and the Talking Cricket in The Adventures of Pinocchio), dies at age 69.
- October 31: Grant Simmons, American animator (Walt Disney Company, Warner Bros. Cartoons, MGM, Hanna-Barbera, UPA) and director (Mr. Magoo), dies at age 57.

=== December ===
- December 23: Charlie Ruggles, American actor (voice of Benjamin Franklin in Ben and Me, Aesop in the Aesop and Son segments in The Adventures of Rocky and Bullwinkle and Friends), dies at age 84.
- December 29: Marie Menken, American film director, painter and animator, dies at age 61.

=== Specific date unknown ===
- Jack Curtis, American voice actor (voice of Pops Racer in Speed Racer), dies at age 44.
- Jun'ichi Kōuchi, Japanese animator, and producer considered one of the fathers of anime (Namakura Gatana), dies at age 84.

== See also ==
- 1970 in anime
