= Golgo 13 (film) =

- Theatrical release poster
- Directed by: Junya Sato
- Written by: Takao Saito; K. Motomitsu
- Based on: Golgo 13 by Takao Saito
- Produced by: Koji Shundo
- Starring: Ken Takakura
- Cinematography: Masahiko Iimura
- Edited by: Osamu Tanaka
- Music by: Chūji Kinoshita
- Distributed by: Toei
- Release date: 29 December 1973
- Running time: 104 minutes
- Countries: Japan; Iran
- Languages: Japanese; Persian
- Box office: ¥1.1 billion (est.)

Golgo 13 (Japanese: ゴルゴ13, romanized: Gorugo Sātīn; Persian: گلگو ۱۳, romanized: Golgo Sizdah) is a 1973 Japanese–Iranian action film directed by Junya Sato, starring Ken Takakura as the international hitman Golgo 13. It is the first live-action movie based on the Japanese manga series Golgo 13. It was filmed almost entirely in the Imperial State of Iran, with an almost entirely Persian supporting cast. It was followed by the film Golgo 13: Assignment Kowloon (1977), starring Sonny Chiba.

== Plot ==
The secret police of a certain country get information that Max Boa, the boss of an international crime organization, is in Iran and sends their agents to Tehran to arrest him, but they are killed one by one by Boa's henchmen. Also, since Boa uses many decoys, even his subordinates do not know his real face. Flanagan, the police chief, calls the hitman Golgo 13 and asks him to assassinate Boa for a reward of $500,000 ($3,454,346.85 in 2024). He arrives in Tehran by plane. Catherine Morton, a female secret police agent, follows Golgo 13 and meets up with him. Meanwhile, Boa's men also learn that Golgo 13 is in Iran and searches for him.

Golgo 13's collaborator, a private detective named Egbali, informs him of the whereabouts of Mr. Wine, a nightclub manager who knows the gang's information, and that Boa is a bird lover, but one night, Boa's men encounter Egbali at a hotel and kills him. Golgo 13, who was present, becomes a suspect in Egbali's murder and is pursued by the Tehran City Police. In addition, Mr. Wine, who was told by Golgo 13 that the Boa Gang has a hideout in the Old Town, tries to inform Boa about Golgo 13's presence by public telephone. Golgo 13 anticpates this move and shoots Mr Wine dead for this betrayal.

There are many cases of kidnapped women in Tehran, and Sheila, the wife of city police inspector Aman Jafari, is also abducted by the Boa Gang. Aman picks up Sheila's coat that has fallen on the street, and suspects an Asian man (Golgo 13) who happened to be nearby to be Egbari's killer, and surrounds the hotel where he and Catherine are staying. Golgo 13 manages to escape and Catherine is interrogated by Aman for aiding Golgo 13's escape. Meanwhile, the police capture a henchman of Boa's close aide, Douglas, and learn the truth behind the disappearance. The Boa Gang engages in human trafficking and attempts to sell the abducted women overseas. Boa, who ignores the investigation, orders the women to be secretly moved to another hideout in Isfahan, but the Tehran police also obtain the information. Golgo 13 discovers the gang's hideout based on Mr. Wine's information and shoots a man with a small bird on his shoulder, believing it to be Boa, but it is a trap set by the Bao gang using a decoy, and he is captured by his henchmen. Golgo 13 seizes the opportunity to escape and takes revenge on the blind hitman killing Walter and his other henchmen. He later kills Simon who was a limp with a metal leg and Douglas partner in crime.

The gang plants land mines on the main road in an attempt to eliminate Aman and his police force as they head towards Isfahan. Golgo 13 takes the initiative and shoots the mines before Aman arrives, detonating them, killing more of Boa's henchmen and obtaining explosives. He arrives at Boa's hideout (a luxury mansion) and takes advantage of Boa's lookalikes having daily breakfast outdoors with many gangsters guarding them, but there are many decoys in the courtyard. To find out which one is the real Max Boa, Golgo 13 shoots at the birdcage and tries to kill any decoys who approach the released small bird, thinking that it is a Boa, but is caught up by his minions and fails in his sniping. Catherine, who appears to protect him and provide cover, is taken by Boa's men and becomes part of the human trafficking victim.

In order to lure Golgo 13 out, Boa takes the women to the ruins of the temple in Persepolis and threatens to kill them one by one if he doesn't show up. During the standoff, Douglas kills Catherine as she said in her final words that she loves Golgo 13. Aman catches up with them and recognizes his wife Sheila, and while commanding the gang to surrender, he heads to the hostages alone and succeeds in freeing them, but is shot by the gangsters and dies from his wound as Sheila holds his hand, crying at the sight of her dead husband. Golgo 13 chases the fleeing Boa in his car but is blocked by a helicopter piloted by Douglas. He is cornered in a desert area and manages to kill Douglas and shoot down his helicopter. Having lost his car in the attack, Golgo 13 walked across Dasht-e Kavir for days without food or water, making his way through the desert. Lakeside at dawn, Boa, who was having breakfast on the terrace of his hideout and enjoying tea after dinner with his mistress, was shot and killed by a sniper bullet along with a small bird. After witnessing Boa's death from the opposite shore, Golgo 13 walks away toward the rising sun, finally ending in tracking down the man who is responsible for kidnapping innocent women and avenging both Catherine and Aman.

== Cast ==
- Ken Takakura as Golgo 13/Duke Togo
- Mohsen Sohrabi as Inspector Aman Jafari (voice: Yasuo Yamada)
- Pouri Banayi as Catherine Morton (voice: Michiko Hirai)
- Nosratallah Karim as Richard Flanagan (voice: Kyōsuke Maki (ja) )
- Ahmad Qadakchian as Max Boa (voice: (Kōsei Tomita)
- Jaleh Sam as Sheila Jafari (voice: Haruko Kitahama (ja) )
- Yadollah Shirandami as Walter (voice: Shûichirô Moriyama)
- Jalal Pishvaian as Douglas (voice: Takeshi Watabe)
- Arezu as Yvonne (voice: Kachiko Hino (ja) )
- Atorashii as Simon (voice: Hidekatsu Shibata)
- Arash as Alvard Johnson (voice: Ichirō Murakoshi)
- Dariush Asadzade (fa) as Mr. Wine (voice: Ayao Wada (ja) )
- Ramezani as Hotel clerk (voice: Isao Sakuma (ja) )
- Gorgii as Inspector Egubari (voice: Mahito Tsujimura)
- Rezā as Jude (voice: Kouko Kagawa (ja) )
- Mashinchan as a Police officer (voice: Akira Kamiya)
- Arahyori as Hotel waiter (voice: Keiichi Noda)
- Ali Dehghani as Agent Evan (voice: Shingo Kanemoto)
- Nasser as Bodyguard (voice: Ritsuo Sawa (ja) )
- Abbas Mokhtari as Jack (voice: Eken Mine)
- Carmen as a Woman at the police station (voice: Kazuko Makino (ja))
- Mohammed Norjii as Claude (voice: Yonehiko Kitagawa) (uncredited)
- Hassan Rezali as Billy (voice: Kazuo Harada (ja) ) (uncredited)

Other voice appearances

The credit title will be displayed in the second half, including the voice actors listed above. Below are voice actors other than those mentioned above.

- Kaneta Kimotsuki as Auto repair shop owner
- Shingo Kanemoto as Pedro
- Osamu Saka, Eken Mine, Ritsuo Sawa, Isao Sakuma, Kouko Kagawa, Kazuko Makino as Additional voices

== Production ==
With the success of Kinji Fukusaku's Battles Without Honor and Humanity, Toei shifted its direction from ninkyo eiga (仁侠映画, "chivalry films") to jitsuroku eiga (実録映画, "actual record films"), and actor Ken Takakura, who had been active in yakuza films, was worried that he would be less likely to be cast in leading roles. Toei, who wanted to keep Takakura on the contract, who had hinted at independence, accepted all the conditions proposed by manga artist and creator of Golgo 13, Takao Saito, who had no interest in making the film into a movie: "All overseas locations" and "Ken Takakura to play the leading role." Production was decided. According to producer Koji Shundo (ja), he said, "We had a hard time because the conditions such as, If we shoot in Japan, we won't allow it to be made into a movie. We obtained cooperation from the Iranian film company SOCIÉTÉ ANONYME CINÉMATOGRAPHIQUE IRAN, and raised the production costs." The production decision was announced in July 1973.

Director Junya Sato said, "A certain person who travels between Japan and Iran approached us with the idea that the Iranian government and military will fully cooperate, and Toei went along with it." Since the number of yakuza movies has reached a plateau, the studio decided to create a movie based on Takao Saito's manga of the same name, which was gaining popularity, in order to create something a little different. Ken Takakura could not get used to the switch from chivalry to true story, and wanted to find a way out.

=== Casting ===
Manga artist Takao Saito wrote the screenplay and also directed the production. However, producer Koji Shundo said that Saito's screenplay was "short and boring, it may be interesting to read, but to fit it into the two-hour time frame of a movie, it needs a twist of drama." Junya Sato was confused by Saito's script and did not film it according to draft. According to director Sato, he said, "The script that Mr. Saito wrote required a huge amount of budget. It's not on a scale that Toei could produce, and of course Saito doesn't know the inner workings of film production, so he didn't write it with budget in mind. Although the screenplay for a graphic novel and the screenplay for a movie may seem similar, they are still different. It was decided that unless we rewrote it, we would not be able to film it."

The script written by Saito was published in the Big Comic Extra Edition Golgo 13 Omnibus Vol. 6 (ビッグコミック増刊 ゴルゴ13総集編 Vol.6), and regarding the fact that it was not filmed according to the script, Saito said, "The movie turned out to be completely different from what I had originally envisioned." All actors other than Ken Takakura, who played the lead role, were foreigners, and the Iranian actors included top star Pouri Banayi and newcomer actress Hope Sepideh Nasaran. Approximately 30 actors appeared in the film with the full cooperation of the film industry.

=== Filming ===
The entire film was shot on location in Iran, and Junya Sato stated that the entire film was shot on location in the country, but Weekly Eiga News (週刊映画ニュース, Shūkan eiga nyūsu) reported that "After shooting the location Iran, some filming took place at a Japanese studio." Since it was the time of the Pahlavi dynasty, filming on location would not proceed unless we talked to the Pahlavi family about everything. It is a valuable video material that shows Iran before the Iranian Revolution in 1979, such as the cityscape, the customs of eating pork and drinking, and women walking around the city without wearing a hijab as the country is beginning to change.

It started in Tehran, then went to Isfahan, Persepolis, and other locations for about 45 days, and it took a lot of time to travel by trucks and helicopters. Ken Takakura performed his lines in Japanese, and all of the foreign actors' lines were dubbed by Japanese voice actors. Takakura enjoyed filming because he loved playing "tough and cool" roles like Golgo 13, which was a favorite of the foreign market. Junya Sato said, "When we got there, we found out that the story that a certain person had told us about the full cooperation of the Iranian government and military was completely false. It was almost like a scam, and we had to start over from scratch. I couldn't do it. I wasted about 10 days with a series of stops, and since the number of days I was staying was fixed, I had no choice but to cut down on the shooting schedule and shoot instead of depending on the level of the script. Revision of the script. I was able to push myself as hard as I could by doing this every day. My condition from the beginning was to work collaboratively with local staff such as the assistant director, producer, and technical staff, and that was accomplished. At that time, all Iranian movies were filmed silently, so it seems like there was a good reason to learn synchronization, but the problem was that the actors had no training in how to speak their lines. It wasn't a big problem since it had been decided from the beginning that the film would be dubbed in Japanese." Therefore, there are no subtitles and no Iranian version exists.

== Release ==
At the December 29 premiere, Koji Shundo said, "There are some great love scenes in the play, and the image of Mr. Takakura will be quite different from his previous perception." Takao Saito also said, "The scenario was written well because of the local location scouting. I didn't particularly change the characters or anything like that when I made the movie, but there's a difference in the fun of a graphic novel that doesn't move, and the fun of a movie that moves, so I tried to create highlights in the moving parts. Ken had an image in mind when portraying Golgo 13, so it was perfect for making it into a movie." Junya Sato added "I couldn't go on location scouting the other day because I was filming another movie, so I was wondering what Iran would be like.

Since Ken Takakura did not attend this premiere, various speculation arose due to his long-standing bad relationship with studio.

In Japan, it was released as a double feature with Female Prisoner Scorpion: 701's Grudge Song. The background music for the domestic trailer reuses parts the scores of Yakuza Wolf (starring Sonny Chiba) and Outlaw Killers: Three Mad Dog Brothers (starring Bunta Sugawara).

It was the seventh highest-grossing Japanese film of 1974, earning a distribution rental income of ¥404 million in Japan. This was equivalent to an estimated box office gross revenue of approximately ¥1.1 billion ($4.05 million), which is equivalent to approximately ¥2.8 billion ($35 million) adjusted for inflation in 2012.

== Home media ==
In the UK, Golgo 13 was released on Blu-ray by Eureka Entertainment on 17 July 2023.
