= 1970 in anime =

- Years in anime: 1967 1968 1969 1970 1971 1972 1973
- Centuries: 19th century · 20th century · 21st century
- Decades: 1940s 1950s 1960s 1970s 1980s 1990s 2000s
- Years: 1967 1968 1969 1970 1971 1972 1973

The events of 1970 in anime.

== Releases ==
English name	Japanese name	Type	Demographic	Regions
Nobody's Boy	ちびっ子レミと名犬カピ (Chibikko Rémi to Meiken Capi)	Movie	Family, Children	JA
Tiger Mask	タイガーマスク (Taigā Masuku)	Movie	Shōnen	JA
Star of the Giants: Big League Ball	巨人の星 大リーグボール (Kyojin no Hoshi: Dai League Ball)	Movie	Shōnen	JA
Attack No. 1: The Movie	アタック No. 1 (Atakku Nanbā Wan)	Movie	Shōjo	JA
The Gentle Lion	やさしいライオン (Yasashii Lion)	Movie	Family, Children	JA
Animal Village Stories	動物村ものがたり - Doubutsu Mura Monogatari	TV	Children	JA
Chippo the Mischievous Angel	いたずら天使チッポちゃん - Itazura Tenshi Chippo-can	TV	Children	JA
Tomorrow's Joe	あしたのジョー (Ashita no Joe)	TV	Shōnen	JA
Goro the Terrible	ばくはつ五郎 (Bakuhatsu Goro)	TV	Bakuhatsu Goro	JA
Fun Anime Theater	おたのしみアニメ劇場 (Otanoshimi Anime Gekijō)	TV	Family, Children	JA
The Adventures of Hutch the Honeybee	昆虫物語 みなしごハッチ (Konchū Monogatari: Minashigo Hatchi)	TV	Children	JA
The Dark Red Eleven	赤き血のイレブン (Akakichi no Eleven)	TV	Shōnen	JA, EU, KO, AR
Tiger Mask: War Against the League of Masked Wrestlers	タイガーマスク ふく面リーグ戦 (Taigā Masuku: Fuku Men League Sen)	Movie	Shōnen	JA
30,000 Miles Under the Sea	海底3万マイル (Kaitei San-man Mile)	Movie	Shōnen	JA
Star of the Giants: The Fateful Showdown	巨人の星 宿命の対決 (Kyojin no Hoshi: Shukumei no Taiketsu)	Movie	Shōnen	JA
Attack No. 1: Revolution	アタック No. 1涙の回転レシーブ (Atakku Nanbā Wan: Namida no Kaiten Receive)	Movie	Shōjo	JA
Bullying Grandmother	いじわるばあさん (Ijiwaru Baa-san)	TV	Shōnen	JA
Cleopatra	クレオパトラ (Kureopatora)	Movie	Adult	JA
The Bridge of Avignon	アビニョンの橋で (Avignon no Hashi de)	TV special	Children	JA
The Demon of Kickboxing	キックの鬼ー (Kikku no Oni)	TV	Shōnen	JA
General Inakappe	いなかっぺ大将 (Inakappe Taishō)	TV	Shōnen	JA
Mako the Mermaid	魔法のマコちゃん (Mahō no Mako-chan)	TV	Shōjo	JA
Attack No. 1: World Championship	アタック No. 1涙の世界選手権 (Atakku Nanbā Wan: Namida no Sekai Senshuken)	Movie	Shōjo	JA
Il torero Camomillo	トレロ カモミロ (Torero Kamomiro)	Short	Children	JA
The Bathroom	ザ・バスルーム (Za Basuroom)	Short	General	JA
Anthropo-Cynical Farce	犬儒戯画 (Kenju Giga)	Short	General	JA
The Flower and the Mole	花ともぐら (Hana to Mogura)	Short	General	JA
Invisible Boy Detective Akira	透明少年探偵アキラ (Toumei Shōnen Tantei Akira)	Special	Shōnen	JA

== Deaths ==
=== Specific date unknown ===
- Jun'ichi Kouchi, Japanese animator, animated film director and producer (Namakura Gatana), dies at age 84.

== See also ==
- 1970 in animation
