= Mahō no Mako-chan =

Japanese anime television series

- Also known as: Maco the Mermaid
- 魔法のマコちゃん
- Created by: Shinobu Urakawa
- Written by: Masaki Tsuji
- Directed by: Yugo Serikawa; Yoshio Takami; Takashi Hisaoka; Hiromi Yamamoto
- Music by: Takeo Watanabe
- Country of origin: Japan
- Original language: Japanese
- No. of episodes: 48

Production
- Production company: Toei Animation

Original release
- Network: ANN (NET)
- Release: 2 November 1970 – 27 September 1971

Maco the Mermaid (魔法のマコちゃん, Mahō no Mako-chan; lit. 'Magical Maco') is a Japanese anime series by Toei Animation. The story is loosely based on the 1837 Hans Christian Andersen tale "The Little Mermaid". It was broadcast from 1970 to 1971 on Nippon Educational TV (NET), now known as TV Asahi.

Maco has been dubbed in Italian, French, Spanish and Korean.

== Plot ==
Maco is a young mermaid princess who longs for the forbidden human world. One night, she disobeys her father and visits the surface, where she falls in love with a handsome man aboard on a cruise ship. When an underwater earthquake causes the ship to sink, Maco rescues the man and brings him to shore. After visiting the sea witch, Maco transforms into a human girl and begins her new life in Yokohama.

== Main characters ==
Maco Urashima (浦島マコ, Urashima Mako) Voiced by: Kazuko Sugiyama
Maco is the 15-year-old daughter of the Dragon King who yearns for the human world. After becoming a human, she is adopted by an old man named Urashima and attends Karatachi Academy in Yokohama. Maco's parents give her a magical pendant called the "Life of a Mermaid". She wants to find Akira.

The Italian dub changes her name to "Ginny Masten".

Papa (パパ) Voiced by: Isao Yatsu, Mahito Tsujimura (episode 26)
Papa is a Dragon King himself and also a Maco's father. He is able to assume a human form and appear on Earth so he can help Maco. He often lets his daughter do her own things but is stern, particularly with Maco's use of her magical pendant and the etiquette she should follow. Later on in the series, he is reprimanded by God for allowing Maco to live in the human realm.

Mama (ママ) Voiced by: Michiko Hirai, Kouko Kagawa
Mama is Maco's mother. She also contemplated becoming human when she was Maco's age.

Obaba (おばば) Voiced by: Kazue Takahashi
Obaba is the sea hag who tells Maco on how to become a human.

Maco's older sisters (お姉様たち, onēsamatachi) Voiced by: Kouko Kagawa, Reiko Seno
Unlike Maco, most of them are content with their lives under the sea. One of her sisters explores the surface and is captured by a young man.

Mr. Urashima (浦島老人, Urashima rōjin) Voiced by: Tetsuya Kaji, Mahito Tsujimura (episode 11)
Mr. Urashima is an old zoologist who found an unconscious Maco on the beach. He eventually takes her in as his adoptive granddaughter. While very stern, he cares deeply for Maco. His real daughter died at sea many years ago. His surname likely comes from Urashima Tarō.

The Italian dub changes his name to "Savio Masten".

Akira Shigeno (茂野アキラ) Voiced by: Osamu Ichikawa (episodes 1, 6, 7, 14), Isao Sakuma (episodes 41, 42 and 48) and Yasuo Yamada (episode 42 preview)
Akira is a young man that Maco saved from a shipwreck. Akira is a drifter who does odd jobs, so he and Maco do not cross paths very often. He is waiting to meet the person who saved him that fateful night. In the original series proposal, his name was "Shinichi", which was used for the Spanish dub. He is modeled after Ken Takakura.

The Italian dub changes his name to "Alex".

Taro Kada (神田太郎, Kada Taro) Voiced by: Hiroko Maruyama
Taro is Jiro's identical twin brother and is more realist of the two.

The Italian dub changes his name to "Ghiri".

Jiro Kada (神田次郎, Kada Jiro) Voiced by: Keiko Tomochika
Jiro is the other twin who lives next door to Maco and Mr. Urashima.

The Italian dub changes his name to "Goro".

Haruko Hayashi (林ハル子, Hayashi Haruko) Voiced by: Sachiko Chijimatsu, Keiko Tomochika (episode 5)
Maco's classmate, Haruko becomes her closest friend there and she loves jewelry.

The Italian dub changes her name to "Camilla".

Bancho (番長, Bancho) Voiced by: Hiroshi Ōtake
The gang leader of Karatachi Academy, Bancho is in love with Maco. His real surname is Matsubashi. He has an older sister who has remarried at least once.

The Italian dub changes his name to "Tozzetto".

Senkichi (千吉) Voiced by: Keisuke Yamashita, Akira Kamiya
Senkichi is Bancho's friend and lieutenant.

The Italian dub changes his name to "Grissino".

Tomiko Tomita (富田トミ子, Tomita Tomiko) Voiced by: Michiko Hirai, Kouko Kagawa, Hiroko Maruyama
Tomiko is a rich girl at school. Her mother is president of Karatachi's PTA, hence her arrogance. Tomiko falls in love with Akira, which sparks a rivalry with Maco. Although she initially hates Maco and torments her, they eventually become friendly.

The Italian dub changes her name to "Vanilla Thomas".

Principal Voiced by: Terue Nunami
Principal of Karatachi Academy, she is strict with the students, especially Maco, and often ingratiates herself to Mrs. Tomita in order to keep her donations to the school flowing.

Mr. Dabagon (ダバゴン先生, Dabagon Sensei) Voiced by: Ritsuo Sawa
Dabagon is Maco's homeroom teacher, but unlike the principal, he does not submit to Mrs. Tomita's demands.

The Italian dub changes his name to "Mr. Pizzetti".

Mrs. Tomita (富田夫人, Tomita Fujin) Voiced by: Keiko Tomochika
Tomiko's mother, she is the head of Karatachi's PTA and abuses her wealth to control the school.

Mrs. Kanda (神田夫人, Kanda Fujin) Voiced by: Kazuko Makino
Taro and Jiro's mother, she raises and educates her sons in a very strict manner.

Mr. Kanda (神田さん, Kanda-san) Voiced by: Ryūji Saikachi
Taro and Jiro's subdued father.

== Supporting characters ==
Kaoru (かおる) Voiced by: Kouko Kagawa
Kaoru is a little girl who befriends Akira on the Fukuyonmaru/Sea Paradise ship. She is later called "Naomi" and "Ayumi". In the Spanish dub she is called "Kaoru" and "Midori". She appears in episodes 1 and 6. The Italian dub changes her name to "Gloria".

Kaoru's Father (かおるの父, Kaoru no chichi) Voiced by: Eken Mine
Kaoru's father is a wealthy hotel manager whom Akira had saved during the shipwreck. He later employs Akira to help his daughter get over her fear of the ocean. Ultimately, his lack of compassion drives Akira away. He appears in episodes 1 and 6.

Mizuguchi and Ryuuko (水口と竜子) Voiced by: Yasuo Yamada and Shoko Sonoda
Mizuguchi and Ryuuko are two con artists who pretend to be Maco's parents. They appear in episode 2.

Hiroshi (ひろし) Voiced by: Kiyoshi Komiyama
Hiroshi is a young man who recently escaped from a juvenile facility in South Korea. He takes Maco and the twins hostage. He appears in episode 4.

Maco (マコ) Voiced by: Sachiko Chijimatsu
Maco is Hiroshi's younger sister and she appears in episode 4.

Yoko (よこ) Voiced by: Kouko Kagawa
Yoko is a little girl who sells flowers while her mother is sick. She appears in episode 7. The Italian dub changes her name to "Giuppy".

St. Nicholas (セントニコラス) Voiced by: Eken Mine
Santa Claus takes the form of an unhoused man. He appears in episode 8.

Jim (ジム, Jimu)
Jim is a black man who is falsely accused of a crime. Maco tries to restore his faith and urges him to clear his name. He appears in episode 11.

Mr. Ushio (潮駅さん, Ushiosan)
Mr. Ushio is an older man who refuses to leave his fishing village after it is ruined by pollution. He appears in episode 12. The Italian dub changes his name to "Mr. Fisher".

Mr. Ushio's Son (潮駅さんの息子, Ushiosan no musuko) Voiced by: Kōji Yada
He asks Maco to visit his father and appears in episode 12.

Chavin and Dobin (チャビンとドビン, Chiyabin to Dobin) Voiced by: Osamu Ichikawa and Isao Sakuma
Chavin and Dobin are two young men who take a liking to Maco, much to her father's chagrin. They appear in episode 13.

Yuriko (ゆりこ) Voiced by: Nana Yamaguchi
Yuriko is a principal's daughter, who was studying in Paris. When Yuriko returns to Japan, she proposes uniforms for Karatachi Academy. She appears in episode 16. The Italian dub changes her name to "Ylenia".

Isao Sudo (須藤イサオ, Sudo Isao) Voiced by: Koji Asakura
Isao Sudo is a top baseball player at Karatachi Academy who is terminally ill. He has a secret girlfriend named Yukiko. He seemed to be modeled after Mitsuru Hanagata from Star of the Giants. He a ppears in episode 17. The Italian dub changes his name to "Kenny".

Miyuki Yokuta (横田ミユキ, Yokuta Miyuki) Voiced by: Reiko Seno
Miyuki is Maco's classmate who befriends Urashima's pet monkey. Miyuki stops going to school and joins a biker gang after her parents abandon her. She appears in episode 19. The Italian dub changes her name to "Marian".

Yoshiko (祥子) Voiced by: Sumie Sakai
Yuuko is Taro and Jiro's aunt and she wants to be a flight attendant. She appears in episode 20. The Italian dub changes her name to "Levisa".

Medama (目玉) Voiced by: Terue Nunami
Medama is a mysterious young man who invites Maco out to Midorigahara. He is actually a fairy who wants Maco's help to stop the destruction of the forest. He appears in episode 22. The Italian dub changes his name to "Verdesio".

Minori (みのり) Voiced by: Kouko Kagawa
Minori is a young woman who looks exactly like Maco. She has an arranged marriage but she only wants to marry the man who saved her little sister's life. She appears in episode 23. The Italian dub changes her name to "Vinny".

Prince Harz (ハルツ王子, Harutsu ōji) Voiced by: Michihiro Ikemizu
Prince Harz is a prince of Escalia and he falls in love with Maco. He appears in episode 26.

Mitsuo (光夫) Voiced by: Michihiro Ikemizu
Mitsuo sees Maco's sister at the harbor one night and becomes obsessed with capturing her. He appears in episode 30. The Italian dub changes his name to "Mirko".

Nobuko (信子) Voiced by: Yoshiko Ōta
Nobuko is a sweet, visually impaired girl who has a pet St. Bernard named Lulu. She appears in episode 32.

Nobuko's Uncle (信子のおじさん) Voiced by: Hiroshi Ōtake
He hates dogs and wants nothing more than to get rid of Lulu. He is abusive towards Nobuko. He appears in episode 32.

Rika (リカ) Voiced by: Yoshiko Ōta
Rika is a young woman who rescues people from drowning to gain fame. She appears in episode 41.

Suzue Satomi (里見鈴江, Satomi Suzue) Voiced by: Eiko Masuyama
Suzue wants to meet the ghost of her mother, who died a year earlier. She appears in episode 43. The Italian dub changes her name to "Suzy".

Funakichi Koinuma (鯉沼鮒吉, Koinuma Funakichi) Voiced by: Kazue Takahashi
Funakichi is a creepy boy who transfers into Maco's class. He hypnotizes her classmates and lures them to a bombing testing site. Funakichi is revealed to be a kappa who wants to get revenge on mankind for how they have mistreated his people. Eventually he realizes the error of his ways and saves Maco's friends. His people go out in the world, deciding to believe in humanity. He appears in episodes 46 and 47. The Italian dub changes his name to "Gregory" and he is a goblin rather than a kappa.

== Music ==
The scores and lyrics for Mahō no Mako-chan were created by Takeo Watanabe and performed by Mitsuko Horie. Some of the score was reused in later Toei series, including Majokko Megu-chan and Genshi Shonen Ryu.

=== Theme songs ===
==== Opening theme ====
"Mahō no Maco-chan" (Magical Maco) by Mitsuko Horie

==== Ending theme ====
"Boku wa Maco ni Tsuite Yuku" (I Follow Maco Around) by Mitsuko Horie

== Episode list ==
No.	Title	Original release date	Ratings
01	"First Love"; Transliteration: "hatsukoi" (Japanese: 初恋)	November 2, 1970	17.4%
The youngest mermaid princess, Maco, disobeys her father and visits the surface. She sees a handsome young man on a passing ship and falls in love. The ship is hit by a tsunami which forces the passengers to flee on escape boats. The young man goes to save another drowning passenger but is swept up by the waves. Maco rescues the young man and decides she wants to become a human.
02	"From the Ocean with Love"; Transliteration: "umi yori ai wokomete" (Japanese: 海より愛をこめて)	November 9, 1970	17.4%
In order to find a home in the human world, Maco pretends to be an amnesic orphan. When she becomes the focus of a news program, a couple claim to be her parents, but they are actually con-artists hoping to use her to make money. Maco receives a magical pendant, "The Mermaid's Life", from her real parents. After escaping from the criminals, she is adopted by an old man named Mr. Urashima, who originally found her washed ashore.
03	"Karatachi Academy"; Transliteration: "karatachi gakuen" (Japanese: からたち学園)	November 16, 1970	21.4%
Maco begins her first day at Karatachi Academy. The rich girl at the school, Tomiko Tomita, loses her mother's diamond ring. As everyone frantically searches for it, another girl named Haruko is accused of stealing it. Note: This episode was later featured in the Spring 1970 Toei Manga Matsuri.
04	"A New Seedling"; Transliteration: "atarashi i me" (Japanese: 新しい芽)	November 23, 1970	26.4%
Taro and Jiro are fed up with their mother and decide to run away. After a fun day playing with Maco, they come across an armed young man who holds them all hostage.
05	"Magical Powers Revoked"; Transliteration: "ubawa reta maryoku" (Japanese: 奪われた魔力)	November 30, 1970	19.9%
Tomiko spreads rumors that Maco's parents are in jail. Frustrated by this accusation, Maco's father takes away the pendant's magical abilities, but Tomiko finds herself in a dangerous situation and Maco must find a way to save her without magic.
06	"Tears of Reunion"; Transliteration: "saikai no namida" (Japanese: 再会の涙)	December 7, 1970	18.6%
Akira is working for the hotel manager he saved during the shipwreck. The manager's daughter, Naomi, is traumatized by the incident and has a fear of the ocean. Akira tries to help her but nothing seems to work. Maco gives Naomi a fantastical ride on a whale, which cures her phobia, but the whale is captured by a fishing net and Naomi's father wants to use it to the hotel's advantage. Maco frees the whale, which Akira takes the blame for. Fed up with the callous manager, Akira decides that this lifestyle is not for him and leaves. Naomi and Maco are sad to hear he has gone. Note: Naomi was originally called "Kaoru" in the first episode.
07	"Vestige of a Human"; Transliteration: "omokage no nin" (Japanese: 面影の人)	December 14, 1970	17.7%
Akira is now working as a dog trainer for Tomiko's family. Maco helps a little girl sell flowers but is confronted by thugs. When they become violent, Akira intervenes. Tomiko gets jealous when he sees Akira care for Mako and uses her influence to get her expelled.
08	"Where is Santa Claus?"; Transliteration: "santa wa doko ni" (Japanese: サンタは何処に)	December 21, 1970	19.3%
Maco searches for someone who truly believes in Santa Claus. Two poor siblings try to get a Christmas Tree.
09	"Battle at the Hill Harbor"; Transliteration: "minato ga oka no ketsu to" (Japanese: 港が丘の決斗)	December 28, 1970	17.8%
Maco finds herself caught up in a nasty love triangle between Bancho and another delinquent student.
10	"Star of the School"; Transliteration: "gakuen no hoshi" (Japanese: 学園の星)	January 4, 1971	16.4%
Yamada, the captain of the school basketball team, is self-centered and arrogant. Maco uses her magic to teach him a lesson.
11	"Don't run away, Jim"; Transliteration: "nige naide jimu!" (Japanese: 逃げないでジム!)	January 11, 1971	20.7%
A black man named Jim is racially profiled and falsely accused of stealing from a department store. Maco tries to restore Jim's faith in humanity.
12	"Sound of the Sea"; Transliteration: "umi no hibiki" (Japanese: 海のひびき)	January 18, 1971	17.7%
Maco visits a fishing village where the sea polluted by factory wastewater.
13	"Date with Papa"; Transliteration: "papa to deeto" (Japanese: パパとデート)	January 25, 1971	15.9%
Worried about what his blossoming daughter might be up to, Maco's father spends a day with her.
14	"Wandering Youth"; Transliteration: "samayou seishun" (Japanese: さまよう青春)	February 1, 1971	14.8%
Maco runs into Akira after school one day. He asks her to give a package to Tomiko. Maco is unaware that it contains unopened letters that Tomiko had written to Akira. Furious, Tomiko spreads rumors about Maco which drives her out of the school.
15	"A Trumpet that Bets on Tomorrow"; Transliteration: "ashita ni kake ru toranpetto" (Japanese: 明日に賭けるトランペット)	February 8, 1971	16.0%
Maco and Haruko meet Takeshi and Billy, two men who dream of forming a band, but Billy ends up working on an cruise line and Takeshi injures his right hand.
16	"We don't want Uniforms"; Transliteration: "seifuku haiyayo" (Japanese: 制服はいやよ)	February 15, 1971	18.3%
The principal's daughter, Yuriko, returns from France and wants to design uniforms for the school. Maco and her friends organize a protest.
17	"I Can Hear a Flute in the Snowy Night"; Transliteration: "yuki no yoru ni fue ga kie ru" (Japanese: 雪の夜に笛が聞える)	February 22, 1971	14.9%
Maco gets close to her terminally ill classmate, Sudo, who has been receiving letters from a mysterious girl named "Yukiko".
18	"A Spat Between Us"; Transliteration: "shibukino nakano futari" (Japanese: しぶきの中の二人)	March 1, 1971	15.8%
Tomiko gets jealous when she sees Maco talking with a boy named Okimura.
19	"Dangerous Youth"; Transliteration: "kiken na nengoro" (Japanese: 危険な年頃)	March 8, 1971	15.7%
Maco's classmate, Miyuki, has stopped going to school and has been hanging around a bike gang. The cruel reality is that Miyuki's parents have abandoned her.
20	"The Stewardess and the Pilot"; Transliteration: "suchuwadesu to pairotto" (Japanese: スチュワーデスとパイロット)	March 15, 1971	15.9%
Taro and Jiro's aunt wants to be a stewardess but suffers from deteriorating eyesight.
21	"A School of Liars"; Transliteration: "usotsuki gakuen" (Japanese: うそつき学園)	March 22, 1971	18.3%
The school janitor has been lying to his daughter for years, claiming he is actually the principal. When she visits Japan for the first time in a decade, it is up to Maco and her friends to keep his lie going.
22	"Someone is Calling Me"; Transliteration: "dareka ga yondeiru" (Japanese: 誰かが呼んでいる)	March 29, 1971	14.6%
A strange young boy invites Maco to a funeral in the countryside. The boy is actually a fairy who wants to use the power of Maco's pendant.
23	"The Improvising Cupid"; Transliteration: "sokuseki kyuupiddo" (Japanese: 即席キューピッド)	April 5, 1971	16.0%
Maco meets a young woman named Minori who looks exactly like her. Minori's grandfather is arranging her marriage but she only wants to be with the unknown man who saved her little sister's life.
24	"Who am I?"; Transliteration: "atashi wa darenano?" (Japanese: あたしは誰なの?)	April 12, 1971	15.8%
The school requires Maco to provide a family record, which she obviously does not have. Since she is insisting she has amnesia, the authorities decide to send her away to regain her memory.
25	"Going Beyond the Mountains"; Transliteration: "yama no nakata hi" (Japanese: 山のかなたへ)	April 19, 1971	15.5%
The natural habitat of a colony of monkeys is threatened by a company that wants to cut down trees and build a golf course. Maco, Taro and Jiro try to help them to find a new home.
26	"The Mischievous Prince"; Transliteration: "itazura ouji" (Japanese: いたずら王子)	April 26, 1971	16.0%
Prince Hans of Escalia is smitten by Maco and insists on spending time with her. Maco's father worries that his daughter is not sophisticated enough to be around human royalty.
27	"The Red Gallac"; Transliteration: "akai gyarakku" (Japanese: 赤いギャラック)	May 3, 1971	13.7%
Taro and Jiro meet Yoshio, a young man with a red luxury car. The twins lie and say Maco is the daughter of a wealthy CEO.
28	"The Grand Angel"; Transliteration: "gurando no tenshi" (Japanese: グランドの天使)	May 10, 1971	15.5%
Karatachi Academy has a new P.E. teacher who makes the students do very challenging exercises. Note: This episode was later featured in the Summer 1971 Toei Manga Matsuri. Maco refers to her pendant as the "Angel's Tear".
29	"Pretty P~lease!"; Transliteration: "onegaishima〜su!" (Japanese: おねがいしま〜す!)	May 17, 1971	15.2%
Tomiko decides to run for student council and appoints Maco and Midori as her advisers.
30	"The Little Mermaid"; Transliteration: "ningyo hime" (Japanese: 人魚姫)	May 24, 1971	15.0%
One of Maco's sisters has been visiting the surface lately and was seen by a young man named Mitsuo. He becomes obsessed with trying to capture her, believing a mermaid will make him lots of money. Note: Starting from this episode, Maco's pendant is called both "The Mermaid's Life" and "The Mermaid's Tear".
31	"King of the Last Stop"; Transliteration: "shuuten no ousama" (Japanese: 終点の王様)	May 31, 1971	12.8%
Maco forgets an important parcel for Mr. Urashima on the train.
32	"Lulu Lives On"; Transliteration: "ikiteiru ruru" (Japanese: 生きているルル)	June 7, 1971	12.6%
Maco brings home a St. Bernard named Lulu that was victim to a hit and run. Lulu belongs to a blind girl named Nobuko who lives with her abusive uncle.
33	"A Fawn Comes to Town"; Transliteration: "kojika machi wo iku" (Japanese: 子ジカ街を行く)	June 14, 1971	12.4%
Maco, Taro and Jiro take in a young fawn after it was harmed by poachers.
34	"Song of Hangnails"; Transliteration: "sasakure no uta" (Japanese: ささくれの歌)	June 21, 1971	12.5%
After Maco hears that hangnails signify lack of filial piety, she decides to write to her mother. Tomiko steals the letters and is confused by all the references to Maco's mermaid life. Note: Kaoru/Naomi is mentioned again but this time she is called "Ayumi".
35	"The President's Many Disguises"; Transliteration: "shachou shichihenge" (Japanese: 社長七変化)	June 28, 1971	11.6%
Maco meets a door-to-door salesman who turns out to be the president of a large company. His company is slated to buy out the zoo that Mr. Urashima is employed at.
36	"Life for Sale"; Transliteration: "inochi uri masu" (Japanese: 命売ります)	July 5, 1971	11.6%
A man's public suicide stunt has a twisted secret.
37	"My First Lipstick"; Transliteration: "hajimete no kuchibeni" (Japanese: はじめての口紅)	July 12, 1971	11.3%
An anonymous person mails lipstick to Maco, but mermaids are unable to wear makeup. Maco tries to find out who sent her the lipstick.
38	"Boss of the Jungle"; Transliteration: "jyanguru banchou" (Japanese: ジャングル番長)	July 19, 1971	12.4%
Maco and friends get mixed up with an all-girl biker gang called the Cherry Group. The leader, Nanako, is actually the daughter of a CEO.
39	"Don't die, Mao"; Transliteration: "mao shinani de" (Japanese: マオ死なないで)	July 26, 1971	10.2%
Maco and friends try to save an old tiger from a terrible demise.
40	"Studying to be a Bride"; Transliteration: "hanayome ninaru kenkyuu" (Japanese: 花嫁になる研究)	August 2, 1971	9.2%
Maco is not good at cooking, so Mr. Urashima hires a housekeeper. Unhappy with this decision, Maco attends classes to improve her cooking skills. She meets a young woman named Naomi. Note: In this episode Maco says she is fourteen years old. This is a discrepancy as she is fifteen in the first episode.
41	"Chance Encounter"; Transliteration: "meguriai" (Japanese: めぐりあい)	August 9, 1971	10.4%
Maco reunites with Akira, who is currently working as a lifeguard. Things get complicated when another girl, Rika, implies she is the one who rescued Akira from the shipwreck. Note: It has been two years since the shipwreck. In this episode, the beach where Maco was found is called "Pearl Shore" while it was "Sakurazaki Coast" in episode two. The cruiseship from the first episode is called "Sea Paradise" here but was previously referred to as "Fukuyonmaru".
42	"Just One Single Record"; Transliteration: "tatta hitotsu no kiroku" (Japanese: たったひとつの記録)	August 16, 1971	8.1%
God is furious and demands the Dragon King bring Maco back to the sea. Maco's class takes a trip on a cruise ship where Akira is working. Akira begins to realize Maco is the person who saved him on that fateful night. The Dragon King cannot bring himself to take away Maco's happiness and is punished.
43	"A Ghost Dwells There"; Transliteration: "yuurei ga soko ni iru" (Japanese: 幽霊がそこにいる)	August 23, 1971	12.2%
Maco and her friends investigate a manor that is said to be haunted by the ghost of a woman who died there last year. The woman's daughter, Suzue, wants to meet her ghost.
44	"An Album without Pictures"; Transliteration: "e no nai arubamu" (Japanese: 絵のないアルバム)	August 30, 1971	11.7%
Maco discovers that Mr. Urashima keeps an old family album in a safe and wants to see it. She is shocked to find out there is not a single photograph in the album. Note: Mr. Urashima reveals his daughter's name was Kyoko.
45	"That Sunday Jerk"; Transliteration: "nichiyobi no aitsu" (Japanese: 日曜日のあいつ)	September 6, 1971	14.9%
Maco is tricked by a boy named Daigo who pretends to be a neighborhood tax collector.
46	"Tears of a Monster (Part One)"; Transliteration: "youkai no namida (zenpen)" (Japanese: 妖怪の涙（前編）)	September 13, 1971	12.5%
An eerie transfer student, Funakichi Koinuma, arrives at Karatachi Academy. Maco discovers he is not human and has some sinister plan up his sleeves. Funakichi hynotizes Maco's classmates and lures them to a military testing ground.
47	"Tears of a Monster (Part Two)"; Transliteration: "youkai no namida (kouhen)" (Japanese: 妖怪の涙（後編）)	September 20, 1971	13.3%
Maco discovers that Funakichi is a kappa. Long ago, kappa and humans lived together in harmony, but humans began enslaving and killing kappa. Funakichi and his people want revenge on mankind. Maco's friends try to escape the military testing ground.
48	"Until The Day We Meet Again"; Transliteration: "mata au hi made" (Japanese: また逢う日まで)	September 27, 1971	13.6%
Akira is seriously injured and fighting for his life after protecting Maco. The Dragon King refuses to save Akira and prohibits Maco from using her pendant. Maco dives into the ocean depths, intending on dying the same time as Akira. The Dragon King accepts that Maco is truly human and saves them both. Akira decides to become a sailor like his father. Before Akira leaves, Maco asks him to throw her pendant into the ocean. Maco finally becomes a true human.

== International titles ==
- Maco la sirena enamorada (Spanish dub)
- Una sirenetta fra noi (Italian dub)
- Makko (French dub)
