= Michiko Hirai =

Japanese actress

- 平井 道子
- Born: 9 September 1935; Tokyo, Japan
- Died: 3 July 1984 (aged 48); Koganei, Tokyo, Japan
- Occupations: Actress; voice actress
- Years active: 1957-1984
- Agent: Theater Echo
- Notable work: Sally the Witch as Sally; Star Blazers as Starsha
- Height: 158 cm (5 ft 2 in)
- Spouse: Shinji Nakae

Michiko Hirai (平井 道子, Hirai Michiko, September 9, 1935 – July 3, 1984) was a Japanese actress and voice actress from Tokyo. She worked for Theater Echo. She is most known for originating the roles of Sally in Sally the Witch, Starsha in Star Blazers, and Ran in Ryu, the Cave Boy.

== Life and career ==
She has been active as an NHK exclusive singer since the age of 10. After graduating from Ferris Women's Junior College in Music Department, she was invited by Kazuo Kumakura to join Theater Echo in 1957.

While she was acting for her theater company, she was also active as a voice actress dubbing Faye Dunaway and the role of Sally Yumeno in the TV anime Sally the Witch among many.

She was married to fellow voice actor Shinji Nakae. She was also a skilled singer and a Mahjong lover

She died at the age of 48 on July 3, 1984, at the Mishima Clinic in Koganei, Tokyo, due to heart failure. Her last works were Mrs Dracula in Lupin the 3rd Part III which was broadcast 4 days after her death, and the historical drama Onna goroshi abura no jigoku which was broadcast 2 months after her death.

== Notable roles ==
=== Anime ===
- Andersen Stories as Ida (ep 3); Ming Ming (ep 11–12); Ball (ep 20); Helga (ep. 22–23); Little Mermaid (ep 31–33); Marte (ep 48); Evil Snow Queen (ep 50–51); Anna's Mother (ep 52)
- Anne of Green Gables as Mrs. Evans
- Casshan
- Devilman as Mermaim (ep 13)
- Galaxy Express 999 as Queen Metamelina (ep 65)
- God Mars as Aida
- Golgo 13 as Catherine (voice)
- Himitsu no Akko-chan as Shōshō Akatsuka (eps 56, 61)
- Hoshi no Ko Chobin as Sagiri
- Kikansha Yaemon D51 no Daibōken as Rinrin
- Lupin III: Part II as Jasmine (ep 85); Melon Ganimard (ep 28)
- Lupin III: Part III as Mrs Dracula (ep 11)
- Lupin the 3rd as Ginko Hoshikage (ep 17); Maki / Rie Makita (ep 21); Rie Makita (ep 21)
- Mahō no Mako-chan as Mama; Tomiko Tomita
- München e no Michi
- Nobara no Julie as Teresia
- Nozomi in the Sun as Miki Kōda
- The World of Hans Christian Andersen as Hans' Mother
- Panda no Daibōken as Fifi
- Reideen the Brave
- Robokko Beeton as Nennen
- Ryu, the Cave Boy as Ran
- Sally the Witch (1966) as Sally
- Sasuke as Sasuke's Mother
- Space Battleship Yamato as Starsha
- Space Battleship Yamato: The New Voyage as Starsha
- Star Blazers as Starsha
- Swiss Family Robinson as Anna
- Under Sea Boy Marine
- Yōkai Ningen Bem

=== Western animation ===
- One Hundred and One Dalmatians as Cruella de Vil (1981 Dub)
- Peanuts as Lucy Van Pelt
- Snoopy Come Home as Lucy Van Pelt
- Robin Hood as Lady Kluck (Theatrical release version)

=== Dubbing ===
- Faye Dunaway
  - The Arrangement (NET Dub) (Gwen)
  - Oklahoma Crude (TBS Dub) (Lena Doyle)
  - Bonnie and Clyde (TV Asahi Dub) (Bonnie Parker)
  - The Thomas Crown Affair (TBS Dub) (Vicki Anderson)
  - Three Days of the Condor (TV Asahi Dub) (Kathy Hale)
  - The Three Musketeers (TV Asahi Dub) (Milady de Winter)
  - The Towering Inferno (Fuji TV Dub) (Susan Franklin)
  - Little Big Man (TBS Dub) (Louise Pendrake)
  - The Champ (TV Asahi Dub) (Annie Phillips)
  - Doc (TBS Dub) (Kate Elder)
  - The Four Musketeers (TV Asahi Dub) (Milady de Winter)
  - Puzzle of a Downfall Child (TBS Dub) (Lou Andreas Sand)
- Marlene Dietrich
  - Destry Rides Again (TV Asahi Dub)
- Rita Hayworth
  - Blood and Sand
- Judy Garland
  - A Star Is Born (TV Asahi Dub) (Esther Blodgett / Vicki Lester)
- Claire Bloom
  - Alexander the Great (NET Dub)
- Ursula Andress
  - Up to His Ears (TV Asahi Dub)
- Catherine Deneuve
  - Mississippi Mermaid
- Ros Spiers
  - The Man from Hong Kong
- All Monsters Attack as Minira (voice)
- Golgo 13 as Catherine (voice)
- Kuchû toshi zero zero hachi as Oh-hara Tsukiko (voice)

=== Live action ===
- Lone Wolf and Cub as Ohatsu (ep 3.14-16)
- Onna goroshi abura no jigoku
- Tooi sekkin

=== Theme song ===
- "Itazura no Uta" Sally the Witch (2nd ending theme)
