= Tale of Gióng the Saint =

Tale of Gióng the Saint Truyện ông Gióng
- Directed by: Ngô Mạnh Lân
- Written by: Tô Hoài
- Cinematography: Nguyễn Hữu Hồng; Trịnh Thị Cầm
- Music by: Nguyễn Xuân Khoát
- Production company: Vietnam Animation Studio
- Distributed by: Vietnam Animation Studio; Vietnam Television
- Release date: 1970
- Running time: 25 minutes
- Country: Vietnam
- Language: Vietnamese

Tale of Gióng the Saint (Vietnamese: Truyện ông Gióng) is a 1970 Vietnamese animated film which was based on mythology, directed by Ngô Mạnh Lân.

== Production ==
By this film, director Ngô Mạnh Lân was called Sir "Gióng" Lân. The film was produced at the time of Vietnamization when USAF attacked North Vietnam. Vietnam Animation Studio's staff had evacuated in Vĩnh Phú province (now Phú Thọ province). They made the film at the night with oil lamp's light.

- Style : Puppet animation
- Artist : Mai Long
- Color printing by National Studio for Documentary and Scientific Films

== Award ==
- Merit prize of Moskva International Film Festival, 1971.
- Golden Lotus prize at the Vietnam Film Festival II, 1973.

== See also ==
- Gióng the Saint
- Ilya Muromets
