= The Swiss Family Robinson: Flone of the Mysterious Island =

Japanese anime series

- Title card
- 家族ロビンソン漂流記 ふしぎな島のフローネ
- Genre: Adventure
- Based on: Swiss Family Robinson by Johann David Wyss
- Screenplay by: Shōzō Matsuda
- Directed by: Yoshio Kuroda
- Music by: Kōichi Sakata
- Country of origin: Japan
- Original language: Japanese
- No. of episodes: 50

Production
- Executive producer: Kōichi Motohashi
- Producer: Takaji Matsudo
- Production companies: Nippon Animation; Fuji Television

Original release
- Network: FNS (Fuji TV)
- Release: 4 January – 27 December 1981

The Swiss Family Robinson: Flone of the Mysterious Island (家族ロビンソン漂流記 ふしぎな島のフローネ, Kazoku Robinson Hyōryūki Fushigi na Shima no Furōne) also known as The Swiss Family Robinson, is an anime series produced by Nippon Animation.

The story is loosely based on the 1812 novel Swiss Family Robinson by Swiss author Johann David Wyss. As such it exhibits the same geographically impossible array of flora and fauna.

== Outline ==
The character of Flone is not present in the original novel, in which the family consists of only a father, a mother, and four sons (no daughters). Flone was likely introduced by Nippon Animation as a new character for the anime version to attract more girls as viewers. Also in the anime version, the oldest of the Robinson children, Fritz, is named "Franz" (though his name is changed back to Fritz in the English dub), and the character of Jack is a three-year-old rather than a ten-year-old. The name of the second child Ernst, here is switched to the father, William in the novel, while the mother Elizabeth is renamed Anna (in the sequel The Castaways of the Flag, Ernst eventually marries a girl named Annah). Like in many other adaptations, Robinson becomes the actual surname of the family. In addition, the new characters of Captain Morton and the Australian Aboriginal boy TamTam were made-up to help the family leaving the island, while Emily is probably inspired by the young English castaway Jenny Montrose. In this adaptation, all the members of the family leave the island. Furthermore, the setting is postdated from the early 1800s to the 1880s. This is deducible not only from the clothing but also from the presence of the Sydney–Melbourne rail corridor, inaugurated in 1883.

Popular in Europe, this anime is one of the few World Masterpiece Theater series to have been dubbed into the English language for the American market. An English dub by PMT, Ltd, titled simply Swiss Family Robinson, aired on The Family Channel cable network in the U.S. in 1989. This dub renames Flone "Becca" as well as her older brother Franz "Fritz". John the dog is called Brewster and TamTam becomes TomTom. The anime also appeared on the Smile of a Child network and Amazon Prime video.

Two scenes from episodes 8 and 30, one where Becca drinks wine and another where she is spanked by her mother with a switch, are removed.

== Plot ==
The Robinson family consists of the patriarch Ernest Robinson, a doctor by profession, Anna Robinson, the matriarch who is a housewife. Anna grew up in a farmer family. The oldest son Franz aspires to be a musician, the middle child Flone is a tomboy, and the youngest son is named Jack. The family receive a letter from Dr Robinson's English friend in Australia, Dr. Elliot, who wishes for Dr Robinson to treat people in Australia due to the lack of doctors. This is an issue for the children, as the family will be permanently settled in Australia. Franz disagrees since he realizes there is no way he would be able to study music in Australia due to lack of appropriate music institutes. Flone is initially excited since she wants to play with kangaroos, but soon she realises their family maid Marie would not be able to make it since she is taking care of her ill auntie. As a compromise, the family decide to have their relatives over, to take care of Franz while the rest of the family move to Australia. On the day of the voyage, though, Franz changes his mind at the last moment and jumps onto the ship.

At the Blackburn Rock ship, Franz meets a girl named Emily who he befriends. The rest of the family interact with various people on the ship, such as the time when Dr. Robinson has to assist a pregnant woman give birth. One night, on the day of Christmas presentation, a storm rages on the ship for five days. Dr. Robinson and his family are not able to make it into the lifeboat as they were busy trying to tend to the injured. The captain ties Franz onto a log of wood which saves him from drowning, and the rest of the family prepare a makeshift raft to make their way into an uninhabited island before the ship sank. They arrive at an uninhabited island (in 155° East Longitude and 10° South Latitude based on estimation of Mr. Morton) where they find the body of the ship captain of Blackburn Rock on the shore. On the captain's burial, they find the Blackburn Rock ship sinking with animals within.

They set up camp at the shore of the beach but are soon forced to relocate and make a house on a treetop due to the presence of jackals/striped wolves. They have John the dog who was the pet of the captain, and they befriend a petit baby cuscus and they name it Mercer. They also rescue some chickens and donkey from the ship and goats living solitarily at the island. Dr. Robinson and Franz spend most of the day exploring and doing carpentry work, while Anna prepares food and does farming. One time, they see a ship coming and try to fire a rifle to signal it, but they fail to catch its attention. They spend their days mostly surviving and building boats/ships and doing household chores and for the children, studying. Once heavy rain and wind set, they set out to find a water-proof home, and they come across a cave. They find a skeleton in the cave with a diary near it, and as they read they realise the man, whose name was Eric Bates, never made it off the island and died, presumably from malaria. They give him a proper burial. As Flone explores the cave and fetching water, she sees a silhouette of a boy running but the family assume that it is a wild animal although they, especially Flone have a hunch that there are other people living in the island. The next day, Flone finds a boy stealing melon from their garden. The boy, whose name is TamTam, is an orphan Australian Aborigine who survives in the sunken boat. They find that he lives with an injured ship captain, Mr. Morton. Anna is initially repelled by him due to his rude nature and after he tried to get Jack to smoke an improvised leave cigarette, but soon warms up to him after she read a letter founded by Ernest on the canoe requesting for possible ship to rescue the Robinson family and after realising he had good intentions at heart. Like Ana, Franz as well does not like Mr. Morton. Tam-Tam initially refuses to interact with the Robinson family as his family was subjected to slavery at the hands of Europeans but warms up to Flone and the rest of the family soon. One day, Tamtam with Mr. Morton goes to the treehouse with the ostrich that they caught. Mr. Morton slaps the ostrich to run so that Robinsons siblings will be able to leave the house to catch the running ostrich, while Franz, Flone, Jack and Tamtam are chasing the ostrich. Mr. Morton climbs the tree and enters the treehouse and steals a rifle, magnifying lens and some of Robinson's family accessories. That night, he leaves Tamtam without a word sleeping on the cave. The next day, Tamtam goes to the Robinson family to see if Mr. Morton was with them. The whole day, he spent each hour on the shore hoping Mr. Morton will return. That night, while Robinson family is sleeping, Tamtam leaves the Robinsons and returns to cave and Ana notices that Tamtam disappeared that morning. Flone, while looking for Tamtam, goes to the cave and notices that the underground water is warm. While Tamtam is with Robinson's family, the animals on the island begin to behave strange. That night, while the Robinson family is sleeping, an earthquake occurs twice. On his return at the island, Mr. Morton asks the family to build another ship as soon as possible, to leave and find their way to Australia after they find out the island is actually a volcanic island which may erupt soon. After staying on the island for over a year, they finally leave to Australia on the boat they built with. The voyage takes much longer than expected but they finally make it, barely alive. They land at the north of Sydney in winter and travel by train to Melbourne. The family is greeted by Dr. Elliot who provides them with a nice house to stay in, while TomTom stays with the Robinsons until Mr. Morton finds another ship. They find out that Emily made it alive and was training to be a nurse, hence after a short reunion, she decides to leave for England to study medicine and become a nurse for three years. It happens to be the same ship Mr. Morton and TomTom were sailing in. The Robinson family say their goodbyes and the anime ends.

== Episodes ==
- First in the series original Japanese episode titles followed by the original English translation and English dub (PMT, Ltd,) episode titles.
- In the English dub, episodes 7 and 8 have been merged into one.

No.	Translated title/Dub title	Original release date	English release date
1	"The Adventure Begins" / "One Letter" "Ittsuu No Tegami"	4 January 1981	3 Oct. 1985
2	"Becca Makes Plans" / "Journey" "Tabidachi"	11 January 1981	10 Oct. 1985
3	"Strange Company" / "Flone's Change of Heart" "Furōne No Kokoro Karari"	18 January 1981	17 Oct. 1985
4	"To Australia" / "Toward Australia" "Osutorāria Mezashita"	25 January 1981	24 Oct. 1985
5	"Becca Takes the Helm" / "Captain Flone" "Furōne Senchou"	1 February 1981	31 Oct. 1985
6	"The Terrible Typhoon" / "Terrifying Storm" "Kowai Arashi"	8 February 1981	7 Nov. 1985
7	"Shipwreck!: Part 1" / "The Father That Can Do Anything" "Nandemo dekirou tousan"	15 February 1981	14 Nov. 1985
8	"Shipwreck!: Part 2" / "Aim For The Island" "Shima-wo mezashita"	22 February 1981	21 Nov. 1985
9	"Mysterious Island" / "New Family" "Atarashii Kazoku"	1 March 1981	28 Nov. 1985
The Robinsons use their ingenuity as they settle into their new island life. Mother enthusiastically plants a garden, but the seedlings are rooted up by wild pigs.
10	"Sad Reunion" / "Sad Reunion" "Kanashihimi no Saikai"	8 March 1981	5 Dec. 1985
When Brewster discovers his drowned master washed onto the beach, Fritz is especially moved because the captain died saving his life. Fritz and his father set off to explore the island and search for other survivors.
11	"The Monster Tree" / "Haunted Woods" "Obake no Ki"	15 March 1981	12 Dec. 1985
12	"Wolf Attack" / "Mother's Enthusiasm" "Okaasan no Katsuyaku"	22 March 1981	19 Dec. 1985
13	"The Deep Darkness" / "Franz's Eyes" "Furantsu No Me"	29 March 1981	2 Jan. 1986
14	"Song from a Shell" / "I Can Hear The Song of the Seashells" "Kaigara No Utaga kikoeru"	5 April 1981	9 Jan. 1986
The family begins building their new house, high in the branches of a tree. Becca wanders away from her responsibilities and is washed from shore on a drifting log.
15	"The House in the Treetops" / "House Up the Tree" "Ki No Ueno"	12 April 1981	23 Jan. 1986
While Fritz and Ernest scale the mountains, the rest of the family scouts for supplies. Becca's playfulness almost ends in disaster, but her mother comes to the rescue, and they find an abundance of food.
16	"Farmer in the Family" / "Home Lesson" "Wayaga No Nikka"	19 April 1981	23 Jan. 1986
17	"The Scarecrow" / "Mother's Field" "Okaasan no Hakate"	26 April 1981	30 Jan. 1986
18	"Brewster to the Rescue" / "Rescue Meri-chri!" "Merekuru Wo Tasukr Te!"	3 May 1981	6 Feb. 1986
When Fritz and Jack go fishing in the new canoe, their little pet Mercedes falls overboard. The danger of sharks prevents an easy rescue, but the dog Brewster saves the day.
19	"Becca Goes Hunting" / "Flone Goes Hunting" "Furōne, Kari Ni Iku"	10 May 1981	13 Feb. 1986
Becca is excited about her first hunting trip, until Fritz shoots a bird and her pity overcomes her taste for meat. She lures home a goat, providing milk and cheese as welcome additions to the family's diet.
20	"Ship Ahoy!" / "I Can See the Ship" "Fune Ga Mieru"	17 May 1981	20 Feb. 1986
Standing watch for ships at the cape is important, though always a useless job. But today Becca spots one, and the family's joy turns to desperation as their signals go unheeded. Though disappointed, they refuse to give up hope.
21	"Turtle Hatchery" / "Baby Turtle" "Kame No Akachan"	24 May 1981	27 Feb. 1986
The Robinsons watch a turtle laying eggs on the beach, and are impressed with the solemn ceremony. Becca and Jack keep watch over the nest, fighting off a hungry snake, until the eggs hatch and the baby turtles disappear into the sea.
22	"The Beachcomber" / "Jack Is A Collector" "Jakku Ha Korekutā"	31 May 1981	6 Mar. 1986
23	"Vacation Time" / "Holiday on an Inhabited Island" "Munjintou No Kyuujitsu"	7 June 1981	13 Mar. 1986
24	"Becca Seek Higher Places" / "Flone leaves Home" "Furōne No iede"	14 June 1981	20 Mar. 1986
25	Night of the Inhabited Island Is Pitch-Black Darkness "(Munjintou No Yoru Hamakkurayami)" Lighting the Flame	21 June 1981	27 Mar. 1986
26	"Gum-Tree Shoes" / "Brother is an Archer?" "Oniichanwa Yumi No Meishu?"	28 June 1981	3 Apr. 1986
27	"For Better Or For Worse" / "Music Fair on the Inhabited Island" "Munjintou No Ongakukai"	5 July 1981	10 Apr. 1986
28	"Saved From Death" / "Jack's Sickness" "Jakku No Byouki"	12 July 1981	17 Apr. 1986
29	"Down The Wrong Path" / "Flone's Whereabouts Unknown" "Furōne Yukuefumeito naru"	19 July 1981	24 Apr. 1986
30	"A Firm Hand" / "Tight Punishment" "Kitsui-wo Shioki"	26 July 1981	1 May 1986
31	"The Birthday Surprise" / "Am I Taking Off?" "Watashiwano kemono?"	2 August 1981	8 May 1986
32	"Strong Together" / "We Made a Boat" "Funega dekita!"	9 August 1981	15 May 1986
33	"A Fruitful Day" / "Rain, Rain, Come Again" "Ame, Ame, Fure Fure"	23 August 1981	22 May 1986
Ernest and Morton devise a last-chance plan to escape from the island. Morton directs the shipbuilding and everyone pitches in.
34	"Becca The Realtor" / "Cave Search!" "Dokutsu-wo sagase!"	30 August 1981	29 May 1986
35	"Secret Of The Cave" / "Cave Secret" "Dokutsu No Himitsu"	6 September 1981	5 Jun. 1986
The cave is dry and Robinsons find the cave already occupied by multitudes of bats, including a skeleton, the remains of an earlier shipwreck victim who once lived on the island.
36	"Bats!" / "Spirits Appear!" "Yuurei Ga Deru!"	13 September 1981	12 Jun. 1986
37	"A Friend in Need" / "Castaway" "Aratana Hyouyuriyuusha"	20 September 1981	19 Jun. 1986
38	"Becca Does Her Best" / "A Man and A Woman" "Otokonoko to Onnanoko"	27 September 1981	26 Jun. 1986
Franz tells his family how he managed to survive the first few days on the island when he thought he had been the only one who reached the shore.
39	"Morton the Grump" / "Sourpuss Morton" "Hinekure Mono Mōton"	4 October 1981	9 Oct. 1986
40	"Riding the Big Bird" / "Tam Tam the Boy" "Shounen Tamutamu"	11 October 1981	16 Oct. 1986
41	"Volcano" / "Morton Has Gone Far Off" "Itte Shimatta Mōton San"	18 October 1981	23 Oct. 1986
42	"Day of Terror" / "Terrifying Earthquake" "Osoroshii Jishin"	25 October 1981	30 Oct. 1986
43	"The Sea Calls" / "Morton Returns" "Mototte Kita Mōton San"	1 November 1981	6 Nov. 1986
44	"Shipbuilding Again" / "One More Time on a Ship" "Mou Ichido Fune Wo!"	8 November 1981	20 Nov. 1986
45	"Donkey, Don't Die" / "Don't Die, Robert" "Shinanaide Roba San"	15 November 1981	20 Nov. 1986
46	"The Boat Awaits" / "Don't Throw Away the Hircine" "Yagi-Wo sutenaide"	29 November 1981	27 Nov. 1986
47	"Don't Abandon the Goats!" / "Don't Throw Away the 2nd Hircine" "Zoku Yagi-wo sutenaide"	6 December 1981	4 Dec. 1986
48	"Good-Bye Island Home" / "Good Bye Island" "Sayounara Mujintou"	13 December 1981	11 Dec. 1986
49	"Together on the High Seas" / "I Can See Land!" "Riku Ga Mieru!"	20 December 1981	18 Dec. 1986
50	"Australia" / "Till Next Time" "Mata Au Nichi Made"	27 December 1981	25 Dec. 1986
Arriving in Australia, the Robinsons are reintroduced to civilization, and to some old friends.

== Characters ==
- Flone Robinson (Rebecca/Becca in the American English dub): The main protagonist and middle daughter of the Robinson family, Flone is free-spirited and willing to do almost anything. She always speaks her mind and enjoys doing new things. The story is usually told from her point of view. Her family celebrates her 11th birthday on the island on September 13. She is voiced by Reba West in the English dub, and by Yoshiko Matsuo in Japanese.
- Franz Robinson (Fritz in the American English dub): The oldest of Flone and her brothers, being fifteen and in high school. In sharp contrast to his outgoing sister, he is extremely introverted and shy. He longs to be a music composer and sets out to accomplish that dream. Because of these facts, Fritz is anything but athletic, spending all of his time after school, in his room, playing his flute and guitar or writing music. Fritz appears to have few, if any friends, at the start of the series. He becomes a more outgoing person, after he meets Emily on the ship and falls in love with her. He also becomes stronger, once the Robinson's become stranded on the island, helping his father with various building projects. On his birthday, Fritz and his siblings catch an ostrich, with help from Tom-Tom. He is voiced by R. Dwight in the English dub and by Tōru Furuya in Japanese.
- Dr. Ernest Robinson: Dr. Ernest Robinson is the 46-year-old father of Flone and head of the Robinson family. He is a wealthy medical doctor who helps poor people who can't afford medical assistance. He decides to take his family to Australia after receiving a letter, leaving behind the home of his father, grandfather, and great-grandfather. He is voiced by Jeremy Platt in the English dub and by Katsuhiko Kobayashi in the first part of the series and later by Osamu Kobayashi in Japanese in the second part of the series.
- Anna Robinson: Anna is Flone's mother, and easily frightened by small rodents, reptiles, as well as other things. She is the typical housewife, tending to the home and children, as well as frowning upon the carefree ways of her free-spirited daughter, Flone, as well as the smoking habit of Captain Morton. She accompanies her husband on the trip to Australia saying she'll always stand by his decision. Her family celebrates her 37th birthday on the island. She is voiced by Wendee Swann in the English dub, and by Michiko Hirai in Japanese.
- Jack Robinson: The youngest son. Unlike his mother, he seems to take after Flone and not be afraid of anything. He always gets into the troublesome way and loves to collect things from seashells to small animals and reptiles. He is three years old and has a feminine voice. He is voiced by Grace Michaels in the English dub and by Makoto Kousaka in Japanese.
- John/Brewster: A Saint Bernard who once belonged to a captain of the ship which drowned in the typhoon, which shipwrecked the Robinsons, and becomes the family pet and guard dog. Jack was afraid of him at first because of how big he was, but Jack eventually became good friends with him.
- Mercedes/Mercre: A bear cuscus or phalanger (a type of marsupial native to the Australasian realm) that becomes a family pet. Becca (Flone) and Jack spend much time playing with her. She is also friends with Brewster.
- Donkey/Robert: A donkey who survived the shipwreck and became a useful member of the Robinsons and a pack animal for carrying wood and sugar cane to the Robinsons compound. The donkey later died of stress-related issues and possibly old age after helping the Robinsons, Captain Morton and Tam Tam hauling the Catamaran into the ocean.
- Eric and Bates: A mother and a baby goat that the family found on the island, named after Eric Bates, a man who stranded several years before the events of the series and died there. His skeleton and diary were later discovered by the Robinsons.
- Captain Morton: A grumpy, hard-drinking, cigar-smoking sea captain who the Robinsons discover living in a cave. Anna disapproves of his smoking habit and dislikes him strongly at first, especially after he tries to get Jack to smoke a cigar, but gradually warms to him. He is voiced by Michael Sorich in the English dub and by Ichirō Nagai in Japanese.
- Tam Tam (TomTom in the American English Dub): A young Australian Aborigine boy about age 9 to 10 years old who is the companion of Morton and becomes good friends with Flone/Becca, Franz/Fritz, and Jack. He is voiced by Tom Wyner in the English dub and by Yoku Shioya in Japanese.
- Emily: A young woman who becomes friends with the Robinsons before being separated during the typhoon. She is voiced by Kaoru Kurosu in Japanese.
- Marie: The Robinson family's live-in servant, who decides not to accompany the family from Switzerland to Australia. She is voiced by Ellyn Stern Epcar in the English dub and by Satomi Majima in Japanese.
- Elliott: Voiced in Japanese by Tamio Oki.
- Emily's Father: Voiced in Japanese by Kan Tokumaru.
- Emily's Mother: Voiced in Japanese by Yoshiko Asai.
- Emily's Grandmother: Voiced by Mona Marshall in the English dub and by Atsuko Mine in Japanese.
- Gerhardt: Voiced in Japanese by Kõichi Kitamura.
- Haizecupp: Voiced in Japanese by Keiko Hanagata.
- Dr. Samuel Elliot: A friend of Dr. Ernest Robinson who lives in Australia. He is voiced by Richard Epcar in the English dub.
- The Captain: The Commander of the Blackburn Rock who once took the passengers on a voyage from England to Australia, and died from drowning after shipwrecked and saved Franz/Fritz, whom he fell overboard with him, from drowning. He is voiced by Bob Papenbrook in English dub.
- The Doctor: The Blackburn Rock's doctor who uses to be drunken. He is voiced by Bob Papenbrook in English dub.

== International titles ==
- A Família Robinson (Portuguese)
- Die schweizer Familie Robinson (German)
- Familie Robinson (Dutch)
- Familie Robinson (Afrikaans)
- Flo et les Robinson Suisses (French)
- Flo, la piccola Robinson (Italian)
- Flone of the Marvelous Island (English)
- Flone on the Marvelous Island (English)
- Kazoku Robinson Hyōryūki - Fushigina Shima no Flone (Japanese)
- L'isola della piccola Flo (Italian)
- La familia de los robinsones suizos (Spanish)
- La familia Robinsón (Spanish)
- La Familia Robinson (Spanish)
- La familia Robinson suiza (Spanish)
- Las Aventuras de la Familia Robinson Suiza (Spanish)
- Los Robinsones de los Mares del Sur (Spanish)
- Robinson Family Lost at Sea - Flone of the Marvelous Island (English)
- The Adventures of Swiss Family Robinson (English)
- The Swiss Family Robinson: Flone of The Mysterious Island (English)
- Флона на чудесном острове (Russian)
- خانواده دکتر ارنست (Persian)
- فلونة (Arabic)
- ふしぎな島のフローネ (Japanese)
- 家族ロビンソン漂流記 ふしぎな島のフローネ (Japanese)
- 新魯賓遜漂流記 (Chinese)
- 플로네의 모험 (Korean)

== Music ==
- Opening theme: Hadashi no Flone (裸足のフローネ; "Barefoot Flone") by Keiko Han.
- Ending theme: Flone no Yume (フローネの夢; "Flone's Dream") by Keiko Han.
- Boshi No Kumoriuta (used at Episode 31)
- English opening theme: Swiss Family Robinson by Ron Krueger.
