= Mahito Tsujimura =

Japanese voice actor

- Born: April 14, 1930; Tokyo, Japan
- Died: November 27, 2018 (aged 88)
- Occupations: Actor, voice actor
- Years active: 1947–2018

Mahito Tsujimura (辻村 真人, Tsujimura Mahito; April 14, 1930 – November 27, 2018) was a Japanese actor and voice actor who was represented by 81 Produce. Tsujimura died on November 27, 2018.

== Filmography ==
=== Television animation ===
- Andersen Stories (1971) – Satyr, Hans
- Paris no Isabelle (1979) – Leon
- Galaxy Express 999 (1979) – Great Chief
- Dragon Ball (1987) – Village Headman
- Dragon Ball Z (1995) – Dai Kaiōshin
- Berserk (1997) – Foss
- One Piece (1999–present) – Banban
- Negima (2005) – Konoemon "Dean" Konoe
- Dragon Ball Kai (2015) – Dai Kaiōshin

=== Original video animation (OVA) ===
- Leda: The Fantastic Adventure of Yohko (1985) – Chizamu
- Legend of the Galactic Heroes (1991) – Eugen Richter

=== Film animation ===
- Arabian naito: Shindobaddo no bôken (1962) – Yasim
- Golgo 13 (1973) – Eghbali
- Nausicaä of the Valley of the Wind (1984) – King Jihl
- Patlabor: The Movie (1989) – Jitsuyama
- Porco Rosso (1992)
- Slayers: The Motion Picture (1995) – The King

=== Videogames ===
- Arc the Lad (1995) – Gogen
- Arc the Lad II (1996) – Gogen
- Virtua Fighter 4 (2001) – Shun Di
- Shenmue II (2001) – Jianmin Tao
- Kingdom Hearts II (2005) -Gopher
- Virtua Fighter 5 (2006) – Shun Di
- Everybody's Golf 6 (2011) – Langundo

=== Tokusatsu ===
- Marude Dameo (1966-1967, Television Drama) – Borot
- Ultra Seven (1967-1968) – Alien Vira / Alien Pega
- Kamen Rider (1971-1973) – Mantis / Dokugander Larva-Imago / Musasabeedle / Namekujira / Kamestone / Dokumondo / / Isoginjaguar / Kumolion / Canarycobra / Namekujikinoko / Hiruchameleon
- Kamen Rider vs. Shocker (1972) – Zanjioh
- Ultraman Ace (1972) – Ultraman / Alien Orion
- Henshin Ninja Arashi (1972-1973) – Obakekurage / Dotem / Gremlin
- Kamen Rider V3 (1973) – Machinegun Snake / Lens Ant / Missile Gecko / Guillotine Dinosaur / Cockroach Spike / Murderous Dokugahra / Zombie Bat
- Kamen Rider X (1974) – Hydra / Okaltos / Genghis Khan-Condor / Starfish Hitler
- Five Riders vs. Kin Dark (1974) – Franken Bat
- Kamen Rider Amazon (1974-1975) – Beastman Centipede / Toad Beastman / Salamander Beastman
- Kamen Rider Stronger (1975) – Kikkaijin Gangaru / Kumo Kikkaijin / Kikkaijin Kemunga / Dokugaran / Dead Lion / Commander Black
- Kamen Rider (Skyrider) (1979) – Cobranjin / Aokabijin
- Kamen Rider Super-1 (1980-1981) – Mukaderiya / Keyman Joe
- Ninja Sentai Kakuranger (1994) – Kasha
- Denji Sentai Megaranger (1997) – Owl Nejire
- Seijuu Sentai Gingaman (1998) – Wangawanga
- Seijû sentai Gingaman vs Megaranger (1999) – Wangawanga

=== Live-action films ===
- Shiawase wa oira no negai (1957) – Newspaper deliverer
- Farewell to Space Battleship Yamato (1978) – Kotetsu Serizawa / Andromeda Captain
- Tampopo (1985)
- A Taxing Woman (1987) – Kikuchi

=== Television dramas ===
- Playgirl (1970–1974)
- Dokuganryū Masamune (1987)

=== Dubbing ===
==== Live-Action ====
- 12 Angry Men (Juror #2 (John Fiedler))
- Bubble Boy (Pappy/Pippy (Patrick Cranshaw))
- Creepshow 2 (Ben Whitemoon (Frank Salsedo))
- Police Story (Chu Tao (Chor Yuen))
- Twin Peaks (Major Garland Briggs (Don S. Davis), The Man From Another Place (Michael J. Anderson))
- The Waterboy (Coach Red Beaulieu (Jerry Reed))

==== Animation ====
- The Adventures of Tintin (Professor Calculus)
- Alice in Wonderland (Broom Dog (TBS edition))
- House of Mouse (Gopher)
- Chip 'n Dale: Rescue Rangers (Professor Norton Nimnul)
- Inspector Gadget (Chief Quimby)
- Lady and the Tramp (Beaver)
- Pinocchio (The Coachman)
- ReBoot (Phong)
- The Rescuers Down Under (Krebs)
- Voltron (King Alfor)

=== Japanese voice-over ===
- Pinocchio's Daring Journey (The Coachman)
- Pooh's Hunny Hunt (Gopher)

=== Others ===
- Borot in Marude Dameo
- Phone in Mighty Jack
- Ambassador in Fight! Mighty Jack
- Soviet spokesman in Latitude Zero
- Shimozawa lieutenant in Kaiki Daisakusen
- Alien Puma in Silver Mask
- Babayan in Chibira-Kun
- ObakeJellyfish, Dotem, Gremlin in Henshin Ninja Arashi
- Invader (41-42, 49) in Mirrorman
- Yokosuka base PS1 in Submersion of Japan
- Alien Meteor (Voice: Osamu Saka, Ritsuo Sawa) in Fireman
- Dora Danugi in Bouken Rockbat
- Mezalord in Akumaizer 3
- Baron Tsuchigumo in Battle Hawk
- Cycle Man, Tokerunger in Space Ironman Kyodain
- Lieutenant Waizeru, Major Enubaru, Lieutenant Colonel Seed in Enban Sensō Bankid
- Bat Man, Fang Wild boar, Haedobuler, Kanibabura, Buffalo Guu in The Kagestar
- Moezo, Amanojaki, Rebirth Noppera-bō, Rebirth Gamaganma, Rebirth Kanedama in Choujin Bibyun
