= Vĩnh Phú =

- Commune
- Interactive map of Vĩnh Phú
- Coordinates: 21.1751792707511°N 105.51646522232231°E
- Country: Vietnam
- Region: Northeast
- Province: Phú Thọ
- Established: 1 July 2025
- Administrative headquarters: An Lão Hamlet

Area
  - Total: 34.60 km^{2} (13.36 sq mi)

Population (2025)
  - Total: 49,755
  - Density: 1,437/km^{2} (3,720/sq mi)
- Postal code: 15631
- Website: vinhphu.phutho.gov.vn

Vĩnh Phú is a commune in Phú Thọ province, Vietnam.

On 16 June 2025, the National Assembly of Vietnam adopted Resolution No. 203/2025/QH15 amending and supplementing several articles of the Constitution of Vietnam, which provided for the termination of district-level administrative units nationwide from 1 July 2025.

On the same date, the Standing Committee of the National Assembly of Vietnam issued Resolution No. 1676/NQ-UBTVQH15 on the arrangement of commune-level administrative units in Phú Thọ province in 2025. Under the resolution, the entire area and population of An Nhân, Vĩnh Thịnh, Ngũ Kiên, and Vĩnh Phú communes, formerly part of Vĩnh Tường district, were merged to form a new commune named Vĩnh Phú.
