= Eken Mine =

Japanese actor

- 峰 恵研
- Born: February 15, 1935; Nagasaki Prefecture, Japan
- Died: February 6, 2002 (aged 66)
- Occupations: Actor; voice actor
- Years active: 1961–2002
- Agent: Theatre Echo
- Height: 164 cm (5 ft 5 in)
- Spouse: Hiroko Maruyama

Eken Mine (峰 恵研, Mine Eken; February 15, 1935 – February 6, 2002) was a Japanese actor and voice actor from Nagasaki. He was lifelong friends with Ritsuo Sawa, performing various Kamen Rider characters together; they became convinced of their impact on children after watching them imitate their roles.

== Filmography ==
=== Film ===
Year	Title	Role	Notes
1978	Farewell to Space Battleship Yamato	Politician A	Voice only
1980	Eight Riders vs. Galaxy King	Armadig	Voice only
1983	Unico in the Island of Magic	Minion B	Voice only
1987	The Story of Fifteen Boys	Korg	Voice only

=== Television ===
Year	Title	Role	Notes
1971-1972	Ryu the Primitive Boy	Karim	22 episodes
1971-1972	Kamen Rider	Bat Man, Mogurang, Cockroach Man, Garagaranda	5 episodes
1973	Kamen Rider V3	Kame Bazooka, Hammer Kurage, Jishaku Inoshishi, Kamikirimerang, Kyuketsu Mammoth	6 episodes
1974	Cutie Honey	Takeshi Kisaragi, Royal Adviser	Episode 16 only
1974-1975	Kamen Rider Amazon	Crab Beastman, Dobsonfly Beastman	3 episodes
1979-1980	Kamen Rider (Skyrider)	Arijigokujin, Kurageron	3 episodes
1980-1981	Kamen Rider Super-1	Bakuronger, Sprayder, Shabonurun	3 episodes
1989	The Jungle Book	Boggy	Episode 1 "Mowgli Comes to the Jungle: Part 1"
1990	Time Travel Tondekeman	Dr. Thomas Edison	Episode 15
1990	Lupin III: The Mystery of the Hemingway Papers	Monk	TV special
1996	Gekisou Sentai Carranger	HH Wasshoishoi	Episode 28
