= Cyborg (disambiguation) =

A cyborg is a cybernetic organism.

Cyborg may also refer to:

== People ==
- Cris Cyborg (born 1985), a Brazilian mixed martial arts fighter
- Evangelista Santos (born 1977), a Brazilian mixed martial arts fighter sometimes known as "Cyborg"
- Roberto "Cyborg" Abreu (born 1980), a super heavy weight Brazilian jiu-jitsu practitioner
- Cyborgs (Donetsk airport), a nickname for the Ukrainian defenders of the Second Battle of Donetsk Airport

== Comics ==
- Cyborg (DC Comics), a fictional character appearing in publications by DC Comics
- Cyborg Superman, a persona that has been used by two fictional characters in the DC Universe
- "Cyborg", the working title and initially announced name for the Marvel Comics character Deathlok

== Games ==
- Cyborg, a main protagonist from Rise of the Robots
- Cyborg (board game), a 1978 fantasy wargame by Excalibre Games, now owned by Decision Games
- Cyborg (play-by-mail game), a 1981 game by Integral Games
- Cyborg (video game), a 1982 computer game
- Cyborg, a 1987 computer game by CRL Group

== Film and television ==
- Cyborg, working title of The Six Million Dollar Man, a 1970s American TV series
- Cyborg (film), a 1989 science-fiction action film
  - Cyborg 2, a 1993 science-fiction action film
  - Cyborg 3: The Recycler, a 1994 science-fiction action film
- Cyborgs (film), a.k.a. Cyborgs: Heroes Never Die, a 2017 Ukrainian film about the Second Battle of Donetsk Airport

== Music ==
- Cyborg (Klaus Schulze album), 1973
- Cyborg (Nekfeu album), 2016
- "Cyborg", a song by WhoMadeWho

== Novels ==
- Cyborg (novel), a 1972 novel by Martin Caidin
- Isaac Asimov's Robot City: Cyborg, a 1986 novel by William F. Wu
- Cyborg: The Second Book of the Clone Codes, a 2011 novel by Patricia and Fredrick McKissack

== Other uses ==
- Cyborg theory, a postmodern feminist theory
- Cyborg (social media), a category of social media accounts, a bot-assisted human
- Mihono Bourbon, a Japanese racehorse nicknamed "Cyborg" for his performance

== See also ==
- List of fictional cyborgs
- Android (disambiguation)
- Robot (disambiguation)
- Cyber (disambiguation)
- Cybernetics (disambiguation)
