= Robot (disambiguation) =

A robot is a virtual or mechanical artificial agent, usually an electro-mechanical machine.

Robot or Robots may also refer to:

== Computing ==
- Internet robot, an automated computer program that runs tasks on the Internet
- Robot Framework, a generic test automation framework for acceptance testing and acceptance test-driven development (ATDD)
- Robots exclusion standard, a World Wide Web protocol
- Return Of Bleichenbacher's Oracle Threat (ROBOT) attack, see Adaptive chosen-ciphertext attack

== Film and television ==
- Robots (1988 film) a television film
- Robots (2005 film), an American animated film based on the children's book by William Joyce
- Robots (2023 film), an American film starring Shailene Woodley
- Enthiran, a 2010 Indian Tamil-language feature film, titled Robot in Hindi
  - Enthiran (soundtrack)
- Robot (Doctor Who), a serial on Doctor Who
- "Robot" (The Goodies), an episode of The Goodies
- "The Robot" (The Amazing World of Gumball), an episode of The Amazing World of Gumball
- "Robots" (The Apprentice), a 2017 TV episode
- "The Robots" (Code Lyoko), an episode of Code Lyoko
- Robot (Lost in Space), also known as The Robot or Robot B-9, a character from the sci-fi television show Lost in Space
- Mr. Robot, a television series

== Music ==
- Robot (dance)
- Robot (album), an album by Nikos Karvelas
- Robot, an album by 3OH!3
- Robot Face, or <|°_°|>, an album by Caravan Palace

=== Songs ===
- "Robot" (CNBLUE song)
- "Robots" (song), a song by Kate Ryan
- "The Robots", a song by Kraftwerk
- "Robot", a song by Miley Cyrus from Can't Be Tamed
- "Robot", a song by the Futureheads from The Futureheads
- "Robot", a song by Nada Surf from The Proximity Effect
- "Robots", a song by Gabriella Cilmi from Ten
- "Robots", a song by Flight of the Conchords from The Distant Future
- "Robots", a song by TV on the Radio from OK Calculator
- "Robot", a song by Getter Janni from Rockefeller Street

== Literature ==
- Robot Magazine
- Robot series (Asimov), a series of novels and short stories by Isaac Asimov
- Robot: Super Color Comic, a manga series
- Robots (Ace anthology), 2005, edited by Jack Dann and Gardner Dozois
- Robots (Asimov anthology), 1989

== Video games ==
- Robots (1984 video game), a computer game originally developed for Unix
- Robots (2005 video game), a video game based on the animated film
- Robot Attack, clone of the arcade game Berzerk
- Robot (video game series), a series of NES games that used the Robotic Operating Buddy accessory
- Robot Entertainment, an American video game development company
- "The Robot", a nickname given to professional Super Smash Bros. player Jason Zimmerman

== Other uses ==
- Operation ROBOT, a 1952 plan to float the pound
- Robot (Czech robota), another name for corvée labour
- Robot (camera)
- Robot Communications, a Japanese independent animation and visual effects studio
- Robot Patent, a historical labour rent in the Habsburg Empire
- Traffic light (robot in South African English) a signaling device positioned at a road intersection

== People with the surname ==
- Alexandru Robot (1916–c. 1941), Bessarabian writer
- Isidore Robot (1837–1887), French Roman Catholic missionary
- Louise Robot (1555 – after 1610), French alchemist

== See also ==
- Android (disambiguation)
- Droid (disambiguation)
- Drone (disambiguation)
- Bot (disambiguation)
- History of robots
- I, Robot (disambiguation)
- List of Robots
- Metalman (disambiguation)
- Mr. Robot (disambiguation)
- Robo (disambiguation)
- Robot & Frank, 2012 American science fiction comedy-drama movie
- Robot and Monster, American CGI animated television series
- Robot Chicken, American adult stop motion-animated sketch comedy television series
- Robot in the Family, 1994 American comedy film
- Robotics, a branch of engineering and science
- Robotix (disambiguation)
- Robotboy, British-French animated television series
- Robot Jox, 1990 American post-apocalyptic mecha science-fiction film
- Robotman (disambiguation)
- Robot Series (disambiguation)
- Robosaurus, a transforming dinosaur robot
- Robotech (disambiguation)
- Robot Wars (disambiguation)
- Self-reconfiguring modular robot, autonomous kinematic machines with variable morphology
- The Robots of Death, fifth serial of the 14th season of the British science fiction television series Doctor Who
