= Cyber Beast =

Cyber Beast, Cyberbeast, Cybeast, Cybernetic Beast, Cyborg Beast, Cyberspace Beast, may refer to:

== Characters ==
- Cyber-Beast, a Mexican superhero; see List of Latino superheroes

=== Character types ===
- Cybeasts or Cyber Beasts, a character class in the Mega Man franchise; see List of Mega Man characters
- Cyberbeasts, a character class in Cyberchase; see List of Cyberchase episodes
- Cyber beasts or cyberbitbeasts, a character class in Beyblade V-Force
- Cyber Beasts, a mecha type in Dancouga – Super Beast Machine God

== Technological beasts ==
- Virtual animal, a beast created in software, which may exist in cyberspace
- Cybernetic organism created from a beast
- Bioroid in the form of a beast created from beasts
- Biorobot in the form of a beast
- Robot in the form of a beast

== Other uses ==
- Cyberbeast, a variant of the Tesla Cybertruck pickup trimotor having Beast Mode

== See also ==
- Cyber (disambiguation)
- Beast (disambiguation)
