= Robo =

Robo may refer to:

- robot, an electro-mechanical device that can perform autonomous or preprogrammed tasks
- Automation (robo-), roboticization
- Robo (musician) (born 1955), Roberto Valverde, drummer in punk bands Black Flag and The Misfits
- Robo, nickname for Jason Robertson, an ice hockey player
- Robo (Chrono Trigger), a playable character in the 1995 video game Chrono Trigger
- Robotrippin, non-medical use of the pharmaceutical dextromethorphan (DXM or Robo)
- Robo, an aircraft design study undertaken in the late 1950s for a Rocket Bomber, absorbed into the abortive X-20 Dyna-Soar project
- Robomower, the robotic mulching lawnmower sold by Friendly Robotics
- Roborovski hamster, the smallest and fastest breed of Hamster. Kept as a domestic pet.
- Roundabout (gene family), the Drosophila melanogaster gene involved in axon guidance in the CNS
- Robo (film), a 2008 Indian Malayalam film
- Robo (2010 film) or Robot, a 2010 Indian sci-fi film by S. Shankar, starting Rajinikanth
- FC Robo, a football club from Lagos, Nigeria
- David Robo (born 1970), French politician

== See also ==
- Roboman (disambiguation)
- Robot (disambiguation)
