= Giant Robot =

Giant Robot may refer to:

- Giant Robot (magazine), magazine of Asian American popular culture
- Mecha, a piloted, remote-controlled or sentient limbed vehicle in science fiction, particularly Japanese anime and manga
- Giant Robot Week, week-long event that aired on Cartoon Network's Toonami in 2003

== Music ==
- Giant Robot (Buckethead album), 1994 solo album by Buckethead
- Giant Robot, 1996 album by Buckethead with the band Giant Robot

== See also ==
- Giant Robo, a tokusatsu, anime and manga series
- Robot (disambiguation)
