= Dronne (disambiguation) =

Dronne is a river in France.

Dronne may also refer to:

- Agathe Dronne (born 1970), French actress
- Raymond Dronne (1908–1991), French politician, civil servant of France, WWII Free French officer
- Dronne, a 2016 album by North Sea Radio Orchestra

== See also ==
- Dordogne (disambiguation)
- Drone (disambiguation)
