= Drone ship =

Drone ship or drone boat, may refer to:

- An autonomous spaceport drone ship or ASDS, a self-propelled sea-going barge used by SpaceX as a sea-borne rocket landing platform
- An unmanned surface vehicle, any unpiloted boat
- An unmanned underwater vehicle, any unpiloted sub

== See also ==
- drone carrier, a ship that operates drones
- Drone (disambiguation)
- Ship (disambiguation)
