= Robotman =

Robotman may refer to:

- Robotman (Cliff Steele), a DC Comics superhero and member of the Doom Patrol
- Robotman (Robert Crane), a Golden Age DC Comics superhero and a member of the All-Star Squadron
- Robotman, original name of Monty, an American syndicated comic strip by Jim Meddick
- "Robot Man" song, a 1960 song by Connie Francis
- "Robot Man", a 1981 song from the Rick Wakeman album 1984 featuring Chaka Khan
- "Robot Man", a 1975 song by Scorpions from the album In Trance

== See also ==
- Mr. Robot (disambiguation)
- Man (disambiguation)
- Robot (disambiguation)
- Roboman (disambiguation)
- Android (disambiguation)
- Metalman (disambiguation)
