= Robodoc =

Robodoc may refer to:

- Robot doctor (medical)
- ROBODoc (software), automated source code documentation tool
- RoboDoc (film), 2008 National Lampoon medical comedy
- RoboDoc: The Creation of RoboCop, 2023 four part TV documentary series

== See also ==
- Robo (disambiguation)
- Doc (disambiguation)
- Doc Robot (DC Comics), a comic book character, see List of Metal Men members
- Robot
- Robotics
- Roboticist, such as doctor of robotics
- Cyberneticist, such as doctor of cybernetics
- Doctor Cyber, comic book character
- Cyber Doctor, online health website
