= Robotix (disambiguation) =

Robotix is a 1986 animated series.

Robotix may also refer to:

- Robotix (competition), a robotics competition organized by the students of IIT Kharagpur
- Robotix (toyline)

== See also ==
- Robotics, a branch of engineering and science
