= IHuman =

iHuman may refer to:

- I, Human, an album by Deus Ex Machina
- iHuman (film), a 2019 documentary film by Tonje Hessen Schei
- iHuman Institute

== See also ==
- I, Robot (disambiguation)
