= Cyberspace (disambiguation) =

Cyberspace is a term for virtual reality coined by William Gibson.

Cyberspace may also refer to:

- Cyberspace (album), a 2000 music album by composer Eloy Fritsch
- Cyberspace (role-playing game), a cyberpunk role-playing game
- "Cyberspace", a song by AC/DC from their album Stiff Upper Lip Tour Edition
- "Cyberspace", a song by Battle Beast from their album Steel
- Cyberspace 3000, a comic book by Marvel Comics
- Cyberspace Command, an alternate name for Air Force Cyber Command, a United States Air Force major command
- Cyberspace Electronic Security Act, a bill enacted by the US Congress
- Sometimes used to refer to the Internet, World Wide Web or virtual reality in general

== See also ==
- Cyberchase, an animated television series
- Augmented reality
- Virtual reality
- Virtual world
- Online community
- Space (disambiguation)
- Cyber (disambiguation)
