= Mr. Robot (disambiguation) =

Mr. Robot is an American television series that premiered in 2015.

Mr. Robot may also refer to:

- Mister Robot, 1959 manga by Shigeru Sugiura
- Mr. Robot and His Robot Factory, a 1983 video game by Datamost
- Mr. Robot (video game), a 2007 video game by Moonpod
- Mr. Robot:1.51exfiltrati0n a game by Night School Studio based on the series

== See also ==
- Mr. Roboto (disambiguation)
- Robot (disambiguation)
- Robotman (disambiguation)
