= Mr. Roboto (disambiguation) =

"Mr. Roboto" is a 1983 song by Styx.

Mr. Roboto may also refer to:

- Mr. Roboto, a character in the film Austin Powers in Goldmember
- Mr. Roboto Project, a cooperative show space/venue in Wilkinsburg, Pennsylvania, USA
- Brendan I. Koerner (born 1974), technology columnist for The Village Voice

== See also ==
- Mr. Robot (disambiguation)
- Roboto, a typeface
- Roboto (character), fictional character from Masters of the Universe
