= Robot Series =

Robot Series may refer to:

- A series of video games made for the R.O.B. Nintendo Entertainment System accessory
- The Robot series of short stories and novels by Isaac Asimov
- a genre of anime where the TV series is focused on robots
  - Super Robot subgenre
  - Real Robot subgenre

== See also ==
- Robot (disambiguation)
