= Droned =

Droned may refer to:

== Songs ==
- "Droned", a 1981 song by Phil Collins off the album Face Value (album)
- "Droned", a 1994 song by Starflyer 59 off the album Silver (Starflyer 59 album)
- "Droned", a 2003 song by Cave In, collected in the 2005 album Perfect Pitch Black

== Other uses ==
- Droned zither, a stringed musical instrument, a type of zither

== See also ==
- Drone (disambiguation)
