= Janice Huff =

American meteorologist

- Born: September 1, 1960 (age 65); New York City, US
- Education: Florida State University
- Occupation: Meteorologist

Janice Huff (born September 1, 1960) is an American television meteorologist and the chief meteorologist for WNBC in New York City.

== Early years ==
As she has sometimes noted on her newscast, though born in New York City, at an early age she moved to her grandparents house in Columbia, South Carolina. She graduated with honors from Eau Claire High School, where she was a member of the National Honor Society, Secretary of the Student Council, Varsity Cheerleader, and Miss Shamrock 1978.

== Education ==
Huff graduated from Florida State University in Tallahassee, Florida with a major in meteorology. While attending, she was a Student Trainee in Meteorology for the National Weather Service forecast office in Columbia, South Carolina.

== Career ==
In 1982–83, Huff was a weekend meteorologist at WTVC, the ABC affiliate in Chattanooga, Tennessee.

In 1983, she became chief meteorologist/science reporter at WRBL, Columbus, Georgia.

In 1985, she received the American Meteorological Society's Seal of Approval for Television Weathercasting.

In 1987, she began work as the on-air morning meteorologist at KSDK, St. Louis, Missouri, where she received an Emmy award for "Best Weathercaster" in 1988.

In April 1990, she went on to the NBC affiliate, KRON in San Francisco where she became chief meteorologist and hosted "Bay Area's Best Bets." While at KRON, she was also named a "Clean Air Hero" by the American Lung Association for her work in promoting cleaner air and healthier lungs.

In 1992, she introduced the nationally syndicated "Weather School" program to the Bay Area, which promoted science education with an emphasis on meteorology.

In January 1995, she joined WNBC as the weekend meteorologist for "Today in New York," becoming chief meteorologist in 1997 at 6 and 11 p.m. In 2000 Janice added "Live at Five" to her duties, and currently appears at 5, 6, 7, and 11 pm Monday-Thursday. She hosted "Wednesday's Child," a weekly adoption feature that aired Wednesdays from 1999-2017 during "News 4 You" and again on "Sunday Today in New York."

In late 1995, she became Meteorologist on Weekend Today, originally appearing on Saturdays & Sundays for 13 years, switching to only Sundays in 2009. She left "Weekend Today" on April 30, 2012, after 16 years. She also occasionally appeared on weekday Today as a fill-in weather anchor and on NBC Nightly News.

From 1997 to 1998, she hosted a short-lived lottery game show called NY Wired, with emphasis on supporting computer labs for schools based on the money won. In the second season, Cheryl Washington replaced her as emcee.

== Awards ==
Huff has received honors and awards for her work on "Wednesday's Child," the prestigious Administration for Children's Services' "2004 Golden Heart Award," the 2004 "Miracle Makers Media Award" for her commitment and dedication to helping New York City's Foster Care children and the Second Annual "Nicholas Scoppetta Award for Service to Children." She was cited in 2002 as a "Grad Made Good" by her alma mater, Florida State University and has also received the Police Athletic League's "2002 Woman of the Year Award," a 2000 YMCA "Champion For Youth" honor and the City of Hope's "Spirit of Life" award for her professional and personal example to New York City youth.

Her professional awards include Bronx Community College's 1995 "Kaleidoscope Award" for excellence in television meteorology; and a St. Louis Emmy Award for "Best Weathercaster" (1988). Huff is a member and Fellow of the American Meteorological Society, on the Board of Directors of the National Weather Association, member of the National Association of Black Journalists, the National Academy of Television Arts and Sciences, and Alpha Kappa Alpha sorority.

She was inducted into the New York State Broadcasters Hall of Fame in 2016.

== Family and extras ==
Huff is married and resides in New Jersey.

Huff voiced meteorologist Stormy Gale on the PBS Kids series Cyberchase and appeared as a guest on the show's Cyberchase For Real segment to explain fog.

== See also ==
- New Yorkers in journalism
