= Roboman =

Roboman may refer to:

- "Roboman", episode of the Filipino animated TV series Super Inggo at ang Super Tropa
- Roboman, Brazilian title of the 1986 film The Vindicator
- the Robomen, human slaves in the Doctor Who serial The Dalek Invasion of Earth and its adaptations

== See also ==
- Robotman (disambiguation)
- Android (disambiguation)
