= Cyber City =

Cyber City or Cybercity may refer to:

- Cyber City Gurgaon, an industrial park in Gurgaon, India
- Cyber City Kochi, a proposed Special Economic Zone information technology park adjacent to Kochi, India
- Cyber City, Magarpatta a privately owned gated community in the Hadapsar–area of Pune, India
- Ebene CyberCity, a city on the island nation of Mauritius
- Cybercity 1, a planned city and part of the Multimedia Super Corridor project in Malaysia
- Cyber City Oedo 808, a 1990–91 cyberpunk original video animation
- Yadanabon Cyber City, the largest information technology center in Myanmar
- Cyber City, a fictional city in Chapter 2 of the role-playing game Deltarune
- Cybercity, a Danish Internet provider, now part of Telenor Denmark

== See also ==
- Smart city
- CyberTown, a defunct online community
- Cyber (disambiguation)
- City (disambiguation)
