= List of Cyberchase episodes =

Cyberchase is an animated mathematics series that currently airs on PBS Kids. The show revolves around three Earth children (Matt, Jackie, and Inez) who use mathematics and problem-solving skills to save Cyberspace from a villain known as The Hacker. The three are transported into Cyberspace by Motherboard, the ruler of this virtual realm. Together with Motherboard's helper, Digit (a robotic bird), the three new friends compose the Cybersquad.

Each animated episode is followed by a live-action For Real interstitial before the credits, hosted by young, comedic actors who explore the episode's math topic in the real world. The show is created by the Thirteen Education division of WNET (channel 13), the PBS station for Greater New York.

== Series overview ==
Season	Episodes	Originally released	
Season	Episodes	First released	Last released
1	26	January 21, 2002	August 7, 2002
2	14	February 14, 2003	October 28, 2003
3	12	May 3, 2004	December 31, 2004
4	10	April 15, 2005	October 7, 2005
5	10	October 31, 2006	September 3, 2007
6	10	November 7, 2007	October 27, 2008
7	7	April 20, 2009	October 6, 2009
8	5	June 25, 2010	July 23, 2010
9	5	November 4, 2013	April 15, 2014
10	5	November 9, 2015	November 13, 2015
11	10	October 23, 2017	April 20, 2018
12	12	April 19, 2019	May 8, 2020
13	10	February 25, 2022	May 20, 2022
14	4	April 21, 2023	May 11, 2023
15	8	April 27, 2024	May 25, 2024
16	7	April 18, 2026	TBA

== Episodes ==
=== Webisodes (2001; 2003; 2005) ===
Preceding the televised animated episodes, in December 2001, three webisodes called "How It All Started" were added to the website.

- Webisode 1 had 16 panels.
- Webisode 2 had 13 panels.
- Webisode 3 had 13 panels.

By April 13, 2003, the trilogy was expanded into "Web Adventures", with a 4th webisode called NUMBERLESS PUDDLES! which had 20 panels.

On December 14, 2005, a 5th webisode called HACKER JACK was added, which had 4 panels.

The "Web Adventures" webisodes page was still up in December 2012, but as of March 8, 2014, it was changed into a redirect to the Math Games page introduced in 2011.

=== Season 1 (2002) ===
All episodes this season were directed by Larry Jacobs. "The Poddleville Case" was co-directed by Yvette Kaplan and is the remake of the original pilot of the same name, produced in 1999.

No. overall	No. in season	Title	Topic	Written by	Original release date	Prod. code (Note: The listings presented here are accurate to the series' production order.)
1	1	"Lost My Marbles"	Navigation	Joseph Kwong; George Arthur Bloom; Kristin Laskas Martin	January 21, 2002	CYB001
Hacker launches a virus that attacks Motherboard; three Earth kids - Matt, Jackie, and Inez - are pulled into Cyberspace to save Dr. Marbles who has been kidnapped and stranded by the Hacker. The kids must use their Sqawkpads and teamwork to locate Dr. Marbles before sundown, when the cybersite reformats itself and turns inside-out. For Real: "Gorillas in the Midst" Bianca locates the Gorilla Exhibit in a zoo using a map and directions.
2	2	"Castleblanca"	Data Collection and Analysis	Dan Elish; George Arthur Bloom	January 22, 2002	CYB010
Cybersquad must stop Hacker from activating his newest creation - Gigabyte - before the light of the midnight moon, or else Dr. Marbles mind will be transferred into the monster and Hacker will learn about all of Motherboard's secrets. The kids and Digit know Hacker is in a castle on a spooky, Halloweenish site called Castleblanca. Unfortunately, Motherboard is unable to specify which castle he is in. The kids must survey the residents of Castleblanca to pinpoint the exact location where Dr. Marbles is being held captive. For Real: "Bianca's Greatest Hits" Bianca must figure out what hot, new music CD to buy as a present for her sister Whitney's birthday.
3	3	"R-Fair City"	Probability and chance	Barry Harman; George Arthur Bloom	January 23, 2002	CYB004
Digit is lured to R-Fair City, a cybersite full of carnival games, where he is kidnapped by a disguised Hacker. The kids must find the unfair/crooked game to find Digit. Meanwhile, they learn about chance and how to spot an unfair chance of winning and losing. Along the way they meet Lucky, a cab driver, who offers them a chance to gain a free cab ride while they search for Digit. Digit is locked in a bird cage with Buzz and Delete as his guards. For Real: "Bianca Flips Out" Bianca recalls trying to figure out which movie to buy tickets to, and if she was giving each a fair chance by flipping a coin. Guest starring: Linda Kash as Lucky
4	4	"Snow Day to be Exact"	Estimation	Ronnie Krauss; George Arthur Bloom; Kristin Laskas Martin	January 24, 2002	CYB007
Hacker is looking for an eternal power source, so he steals Solaria's Sunisphere. The Cybersquad has to get it back before the whole site freezes over. For Real: "Regards to Broadway" Harry is trying to decide whether or not he should stay in a long line to buy theater tickets or instead go see a movie. Guest starring: Robert Smith as Olli
5	5	"Sensible Flats"	Area	Barry Harman; George Arthur Bloom; Kristin Laskas Martin	January 25, 2002	CYB005
Hacker participates in a land rush in which participants cannot build property bigger than Judge Trudy's land. Hacker's land is accused of being bigger than Trudy's, but they turns out to be the exact same size. For Real: "The Big Sleep" A girl is trying to figure how many guests to invite in her birthday sleepover.
6	6	"Zeus on the Loose"	Fractions	Ronnie Krauss; George Arthur Bloom; Kristin Laskas Martin	January 28, 2002	CYB002
The kids fail to stop Hacker from stealing Pandora's box in Mount Olympus, so they must solve a riddle and complete challenges to satisfy Zeus and earn a second chance. For Real: "Room for One More" Harry made lemonade for him and Jennifer, but she invites her sister, her sister invites her boyfriend and her boyfriend invites his cousins.
7	7	"The Poddleville Case"	Patterns	Jocelyn Stevenson; Kristin Laskas Martin; Peter Colley; Ronnie Krauss; Sheila Head	January 29, 2002	CYB006
Hacker attempts to take power from the vault in Poddleville for himself by stealing the residents' power pods, much to the detriment of the community. Each power pod has a shape and a number from 1 to 12, and after Inez and Matt are imprisoned it becomes a race to solve the pattern and enter the vault. For Real: "Stomp, Look, and Listen" This is the only segment that does not star Harry or Bianca, instead featuring Kareem and the percussion group STOMP and their use of patterns to create music.
8	8	"And They Counted Happily Ever After"	Number, Operations, and Counting	Brian Meehl; George Arthur Bloom; Kristin Laskas Martin	January 30, 2002	CYB003
Wicked casts a spell that erases the memories of the citizens, so that they forget how to count. For Real: "Bianca on the Run" A little girl named Maya helps Bianca count how many runners there are in the marathon.
9	9	"Clock Like an Egyptian"	Time Keeping	Sheila Head; George Arthur Bloom	January 31, 2002	CYB009
Dr. Marbles finds the encryptor chip in an ancient pyramid, but the Mummy who guards the pyramid finds Marbles. When the Cybersquad arrives, they must work their way through the chambers of the pyramid, find Dr. Marbles, and escape before a trap set by the Mummy seals them inside forever. For Real: "Harry's Time Out" Harry talks about the clocks that can tell time. Guest Starring: Bebe Neuwirth as Binky
10	10	"Secrets of Symmetria"	Symmetry	Written by : George Arthur Bloom & Kristin Laskas Martin; Based on a Story by : Noel MacNeal	February 1, 2002	CYB008
Dr. Marbles builds Symmetria because of his passion of symmetry, but Hacker steals the symmetrizer and destroys Symmetria by splitting everything symmetrical in half. The Cybersquad has to figure out how to get the symmetrizer back from Hacker. For Real: "This Takes the Cake" Harry starts a new job decorating cakes, and must maintain the symmetry of the icing. Guest Starring: Jasmine Guy as Ava
11	11	"A Day at the Spa"	Combinations	Adam Rudman; George Arthur Bloom	February 4, 2002	CYB011
The kids are assigned to steal a crystal that powers Hacker's gadgets, while distracting Hacker with a series of spa treatments. For Real: "Harry Does Lunch" Harry has to figure out how to attract more customers by combining sandwiches.
12	12	"Of All the Luck"	Logic	Adam Rudman; George Arthur Bloom	February 5, 2002	CYB018
Hacker decides he needs to change his luck from bad to good, so he hires Baskerville, a new henchman, to replace Buzz and Delete while the 10 good luck charms of Cyberspace ensure him good luck. The kids and Digit use logic to rescue the charms and stop Hacker. For Real: "A Pizza to Go with Gross Anchovies" Bianca makes a pizza that has all the toppings that she and her friends like.
13	13	"Eureeka"	2D and 3D Geometry	George Arthur Bloom; Kristin Laskas Martin	February 6, 2002	CYB015
Professor Archimedes has the encryptor chip, but has to activate the emergency defense system when Hacker arrives to steal it. He and his building shrink to 2D, and the kids and Digit have to put him back to 3D. For Real: "All Dolled Up" Harry turns a flat paper of a dollhouse into a 3D dollhouse.
14	14	"Cool It"	Liquid Volume	Robert Schechter; George Arthur Bloom	February 7, 2002	CYB014
Motherboard is suddenly sickened by the green liquid because of Buzz and Delete. So it's up to Digit and the kids to heal her using the blue liquid. For Real: "Bianca's Babysitting Blues" Bianca is babysitting and must feed the infants the same amount of formula using bottles of different shapes.
15	15	"Find Those Gleamers"	Algebra	Dan Elish; George Arthur Bloom; Kristin Laskas Martin	February 8, 2002	CYB017
Hacker challenges the kids and Digit to a game show entitled "Find Those Gleamers!": Gleamers being lightning bugs that power ships such as the Grim Wreaker. The kids have to make their ship, the Grim Wreaker 2, take off before time expires. For Real: "That Suits Me Fine" Harry is looking for a new look and wants to find something that costs the most his money will buy.
16	16	"Codename: Icky"	Codes	Story by : Dave Dias; Written by : Written by	February 11, 2002	CYB019
Hacker steals the cyber slug Icky to destroy Aquari-yum, and the kids make a code to fool him. For Real: "Harry's Cracked Code" Harry decodes a message written in a Viking Alphabet.
17	17	"Return to Sensible Flats"	Line Graphs	Story by : Nina Shelton; Written by : Written by	February 12, 2002	CYB012
Hacker steals all the water from Sensible Flats to buy up their land, and the kids must determine when this started and how to fix it. For Real: "An Endless Cycle" Harry travels to his grandmother's house on his unicycle, and uses a line graph to keep track of his progress.
18	18	"Problem Solving in Shangri-La"	Working Backwards	Sheila Head; George Arthur Bloom; Kristin Laskas Martin	February 13, 2002	CYB016
After Hacker kidnaps the kids, he crash-lands in Shangri-La, where Master Pi challenges both groups to a special contest. The winner is free to come and go at will, while the loser has to stay in Shangri-La until they learn to solve the problems. For Real: "Following the Paper Trail" Harry makes a deal with his brother Pete that if he can do all his newspaper work, he can get pancakes for breakfast for a month.
19	19	"Send in the Clones"	Multiplication	George Arthur Bloom; Peggy Sarlin; Kristin Laskas Martin	February 14, 2002	CYB020
Hacker's invention to clone himself accidentally clones Delete instead, leading him to produce 3 clones every time he sneezes. The kids and Digit enlist the help of clone catcher Cy Clone. For Real: "Donut Doze Off" Bianca starts a job at a Krispy Kreme store and must figure out how many donuts she needs to decorate.
20	20	"Trading Places"	Monetary Systems	Adam Rudman; George Arthur Bloom	March 14, 2002	CYB021
After crashing into each other's ships and crash-landing, the kids and Hacker must deal with bartering with one another to repair their ships. Also, Buzz and Delete suddenly become brilliant, and an evil genie named Warren disobeys his mother's orders to stay inside his bottle. For Real: "All That Glitters is Not Gold" Bianca finds a gold coin and thinks she's rich, but she talks to an expert and tells her it's only worth a dollar.
21	21	"Less Than Zero"	Negative Numbers	Dan Elish; George Arthur Bloom	July 3, 2002	CYB013
The kids chase Hacker around a building consisting of floors that have both positive and negative numbers. For Real: "Keeping it Positive" Harry is trying out for a sports team and must maintain a positive score from the judges.
22	22	"Model Behavior"	Using Models	Sheila Head; George Arthur Bloom	July 10, 2002	CYB023
A Sky Wall is built to protect Happily Ever After from Hacker, but he plans to invade when Wicked's operatic voice will break it. One of the Three Little Pigs secretly aides Hacker after a promise of protection from the Big Bad Wolf, so the kids have to do double duty to expose him and stop Wicked from singing. For Real: "Bianca Gets Spacey" Bianca decides to go on a simulated mission in a model spacecraft at the Challenger Center, because she loves space movies.
23	23	"Fortress of Attitude"	Linear Measurements	Dave Dias; George Arthur Bloom	July 17, 2002	CYB024
Hacker has a statue which broadcasts his voice 24/7. This leads Cybersites to surrender once they can no longer bear it. For Real: "On the Right Track" Bianca decides to compete in a 200-meter race.
24	24	"Size Me Up"	Scale and Size	Dan Elish; George Arthur Bloom	July 24, 2002	CYB025
Digit and the Cybersquad are tricked into going to a land of giants, with Motherboard unaware of their presence. Hacker leaves them stranded, and threatens to send another deadlier virus to Motherboard. The Cybersquad must escape and stop Motherboard from receiving Hacker's virus. For Real: "Bianca Gets the Big Picture" Bianca volunteers to take over an important job when an employee name Pat has fallen ill.
25	25	"A Battle of Equals"	Balancing Equations	Adam Rudman; George Arthur Bloom	July 31, 2002	CYB026
Hacker pollutes Cyberspace with dangerous cyber-static by tampering with four satellites designed to keep everything free from cyber-static cling. For Real: "Bianca's Corny Act" Bianca needs to multiply the ingredients to make popcorn.
26	26	"Out of Sync"	Patterns in Music	Dan Elish; George Arthur Bloom	August 7, 2002	CYB022
Hacker kidnaps the Beast, a member of a famous band on Mount Olympus. Without him, the band can't perform their music properly and in sync, which causes the Cybersite to begin self-destructing. Its all up to the Cybersquad to reunite the band and save Mount Olympus. For Real: "When Harry Met Stephanie" Harry takes some tap-dancing lessons and learns that tap-dancing is like a pattern.

=== Season 2 (2003) ===
All episodes this season were directed by Larry Jacobs.

No. overall	No. in season	Title	Topic	Written by	Original release date	Prod. code
27	1	"Hugs & Witches"	Median of Data (Average)	Sheila Head; George Arthur Bloom; Kristin Laskas Martin	February 14, 2003	CYB029
Lady Lovelace comes up with a way to eliminate Hacker's virus, but Hacker traps her and Dr. Marbles in her time machine, and programs it to travel to the beginning of time. For Real: "If the Shoe Fits" Bianca works in a shoe shop and picks the perfect shoe for the customers. Former SNL cast member and 3rd Rock From The Sun star Jane Curtin guest stars as Lady Lovelace.
28	2	"Totally Rad"	Perimeter/Area Relationship	Adam Rudman; George Arthur Bloom	March 31, 2003	CYB030
Hacker becomes the king of Radopolis by replacing King Dudicus. Subsequently, three players on Team Hacker compete against Matt, Jackie, and Inez, who are on Team Motherboard. The Cybersquad uses area and perimeter to narrow the size of the playing field in order to triumph against Hacker's team. For Real: "The Dumas Diamond" To win the Dumas Diamond Challenge, Harry has to measure length of the area in the room.
29	3	"Harriet Hippo & the Mean Green"	Equivalent Fractions	Adam Rudman; George Arthur Bloom; Kristin Laskas Martin	April 1, 2003	CYB027
Thanks to one of Wicked's spells, Motherboard starts turning all Cybersites mean and green. Digit retrieves and subsequently breaks the antidote, with no other antidotes available to break the spell. The kids must figure out how to remake the antidote. (Meanwhile, Hacker has a romantic encounter with Wicked.) For Real: "Bianca's New Pet" Bianca is about to adopt Lassie, whom she thinks is a dog when she's really a pig and builds a doghouse for her.
30	4	"True Colors"	Counter Examples	Dan Elish; George Arthur Bloom; Kristin Laskas Martin	April 2, 2003	CYB028
Hacker starts an election campaign to become the new ruler of Cyberspace, planning to replace Motherboard. He also appears to turn over a new leaf, doing good deeds all around Cyberspace to gain public favor for votes. The Cybersquad must prove that Hacker is lying about being good before the election is over. For Real: "Harry Makes a Mess" Harry buys a Sleazy-Off to clean his shirt but it doesn't work. Al Roker guest stars as Sam Vander Rom
31	5	"All the Right Angles"	Angle Measurement	Adam Rudman; George Arthur Bloom	April 3, 2003	CYB031
Ivanca the Invincible has a treasure map that Dr. Marbles mails to Motherboard's "buddy list." However, the virus also causes her to mail it to her "baddy list," which gives Hacker the map. Meanwhile, Digit is on an undercover mission for Motherboard, going to Hacker pretending to have reverted to the dark side, into thinking he's turned evil again, to stall him long enough so the kids can find the treasure first. For Real: "Harry Gets Board" Harry goes snowboarding and vows to do a 360°.
32	6	"Mother's Day"	Decimals	Adam Rudman; George Arthur Bloom; Kristin Laskas Martin	May 9, 2003	CYB033
While Jackie worries over what to get her mother for Mother's Day, Hacker wrecks the Mother's Day festival in Cyberspace by interfering with a train shipment of special flowers. For Real: "Bianca Hits the Road" Bianca tries to make it to the concert but ends up in the wrong place.
33	7	"The Eye of Rom"	Inverse Operations	Dan Elish; George Arthur Bloom; Kristin Laskas Martin	May 16, 2003	CYB032
Hacker steals Pyramida's Eye of Rom from its pyramid, which he plans to use against Motherboard. Because of this theft, when the pyramid's shadow hits the Nile River, the site will crash. For Real: "Bianca's Undoing" Bianca imagines to be a secret agent, start to do the steps and repeat in reverse, but soon triggers the alarm. Guest Starring: Bebe Neuwirth as Binky
34	8	"A Whale of a Tale"	Ballpark estimation	Peggy Sarlin; George Arthur Bloom	May 23, 2003	CYB035
Hacker reprograms trapeze artist Glowla's robotic whale partner, Spout, into going rogue to destroy R-Fair City. For Real: "Harry's Such a Card" Harry sells cheesy greeting cards on the street, but only a few have brought them.
35	9	"Double Trouble"	Growth by Doubling	Adam Rudman; Dan Elish; Kristin Laskas Martin; George Arthur Bloom	May 30, 2003	CYB036
Hacker steals the Golden Droplet of Shangri-La, which doubles upon being removed from its pot, and doubles forever. He also kidnaps Master Pi for insurance. For Real: "Harry Goes Against the Grain" Harry is playing chess with a boy he's babysitting, and the boy tells him “The Legend of the Grain of Rice.” Guest Starring: Geoffrey Holder as Master Pi
36	10	"Raising the Bar"	Bar graphs	David Dias; George Arthur Bloom	September 15, 2003	CYB037
The Cybrary, owned and operated by Ms. Fileshare, has a bug problem, so she hires an exterminator named the Vermin Vexor (Hacker in disguise) to help her with the problem. The Vermin Vexor (Hacker) instead adds more bugs so all references of Motherboard get switched to himself, and he alters two bar graphs to hide the truth. For Real: "When Harry Meets Bianca" Harry and Bianca both get the same job in a movie theater. Guest Starring: Jasmine Guy as Ms. Fileshare
37	11	"The Wedding Scammer"	Problem Solving	Matt Costello; George Arthur Bloom; Kristin Laskas Martin	September 16, 2003	CYB040
Wicked poses as a princess who had announced to get married, and her groom is Hacker. Sam Vander Rom and his co-host plan to air the wedding on cyberwide TV, while the kids look for the real prince and princess. For Real: "Training the Trainer" Harry does his work at an aquarium as an animal trainer.
38	12	"The Guilty Party"	Point of View	Barry Harman; George Arthur Bloom	September 17, 2003	CYB039
In Poddleville, Hacker gets robbed and frames magician Slythe O'Hand and his dog Presto for it. For Real: "Hoop Schemes" To win a basketball game, Bianca has to look at the hoop in a different way.
39	13	"A Time to Cook"	Elapsed Time	Adam Rudman; George Arthur Bloom	September 18, 2003	CYB038
Digit and the kids compete against Hacker on the popular cooking game show "Fearless Chef." For Real: "Radio Daze" Harry messes up his job by missing the time where he is supposed to playing music on the schedule.
40	14	"Trick or Treat"	Functions	Barry Harman; George Arthur Bloom	October 28, 2003	CYB034
On Halloween, Hacker invades Motherboard with a toy frog. For Real: "Bianca Functions in the Wild" Bianca does her first camping trip with her friend Wendy, but they soon find a vending machine in the forest.

=== Season 3 (2004) ===
All episodes this season were directed by Larry Jacobs.

No. overall	No. in season	Title	Topic	Written by	Original release date	Prod. code
41	1	"EcoHaven CSE"	Body Math	Dave Dias; George Arthur Bloom; Kristin Laskas Martin	May 3, 2004	CYB043
Someone has stolen the legendary cyber beast Choocroca from cyberspace EcoHaven. For Real: "The Great Stringdini" Harry does a magic trick that no one has seen before.
42	2	"The Borg of the Ring"	Circles	Adam Rudman; George Arthur Bloom; Kristin Laskas Martin	May 4, 2004	CYB041
King Dudicus accidentally uncovers the long-lost "Totally Rad Ring of Radopolis," which grants whoever wears it on their head their hearts desires. The citizens suggest putting it in a safe place where nobody can use it for anything, but Hacker steals it and uses it to attack Motherboard. For Real: "Bianca's Good Turn" Bianca fixes a wheel but putting the nails in the right place.
43	3	"A World Without Zero"	Zero	Barry Harman; George Arthur Bloom; Kristin Laskas Martin	May 5, 2004	CYB042
Hacker's insulting letters to Mr. Zero cause him to leave Gollywood, leading all zeros on signs to disappear and further chaos to ensure. However, contrary to what the people think, their main central bank still has all nine million snelfus, which Hacker plans to use to finance all his conquering quests. For Real: "Zero Gravity at the Circus" Harry and his 7-year-old partner are training for a circus act.
44	4	"A Piece of the Action"	Percents	Adam Rudman; George Arthur Bloom; Kristin Laskas Martin	May 6, 2004	CYB044
Hacker doesn't know he is allergic to magnetite, which he uses to plan to erase Motherboard forever. Meanwhile, Hacker keeps a bunch of Scritter hostage, and he subsequently captures Digit. For Real: "Bianca's Fifty Percent Solution" A persuasive shop clerk tricks Bianca into buying some stuff in her store.
45	5	"The Creech Who Would be Crowned"	Direction and Distance	Adam Rudman; George Arthur Bloom; Kristin Laskas Martin	May 7, 2004	CYB046
Tikiville crowns its new monarchs with a race, which Creech, once part of a royal family, plans to win. Hacker also enters the race, planning to use the crown to turn Tikiville's giant statues into an army if he wins. For Real: "Bend it Like Bianca" Bianca volunteers to play soccer, but it doesn't go very well.
46	6	"The Grapes of Plath"	High-Low Estimation	Ronnie Krauss; George Arthur Bloom; Kristin Laskas Martin	September 16, 2004	CYB045
After the prince of crabs takes a dare and subsequently becomes dishonest after falling in the Abyss, the kids and Digit must find the Grapes of Plath to restore his ability to tell the truth, located in the Fountain of Truth. Hacker pursues the Grapes as well, under the false impression that Motherboard said "Fountain of Youth", assuming the grapes are a cure for his chin problem. For Real: "Harry Talks Turkey" Harry does his job at a restaurant as both the chef and a waiter.
47	7	"A Perfect Fit"	Tessellations	Barry Harman; George Arthur Bloom; Kristin Laskas Martin	September 23, 2004	CYB050
Hacker tries to restore his giant robot, Gigabyte, by using the rays of Jimaya's sun. For Real: "Harry's Off the Wall Scheme" Harry needs to replace the clown poster by tessellating.
48	8	"Be Reasonable"	Reasoning	Dave Dias; George Arthur Bloom; Kristin Laskas Martin	September 30, 2004	CYB047
The Cybrary is under attack again, and the kids have to use logic and elimination processes to stop Hacker from entering Motherboard's vault. For Real: "Bianca Gets a Clue" When the sacred cup of Cameroon goes missing, Bianca tries to figure out who stole it.
49 50	9 10	"The Snelfu Snafu"	Saving Money Spending Money	Ronnie Krauss (Part 1); Adam Rudman (Part 2); George Arthur Bloom; Kristin Laskas Martin	October 7, 2004 October 14, 2004	CYB051 CYB052
The kids win the encryptor chip in an auction after saving enough money to buy it, but Hacker infected it and subsequently made himself the ruler of Cyberspace. After saving Dr. Marbles, the kids help him save Motherboard by having to reboot her, destroying the encryptor chip in the process. Meanwhile, Hacker breaks up with Wicked upon discovering she spent all 10 million snelfus on clothes and merchandise. For Real (Part 1): "Harry Saves the Day" Harry needs to save some money to go to Mexico. For Real (Part 2): "Bianca's Good Deed" Bianca accidentally took too much change from her customer, Karen, and has to take it back to her.
51	11	"Shari Spotter and the Cosmic Crumpets"	Mixed-Number Fractions	Barry Harman; George Arthur Bloom; Kristin Laskas Martin	October 28, 2004	CYB048
Digit and the kids help Shari of Frogsnorts bake the Cosmic Crumpets. Hacker then attempts to use the magical Cosmic Crumpets to steal the powers of the scorcerers of Frogsnorts and become the most powerful magician in Cyberspace. When Hacker steals the sorcerers' powers, the Cybersquad helps Shari restore the magicians' powers. For Real: "Bianca Takes the Cake" Bianca helps Nicole bake some halloween cupcakes for her school's Halloween bake sale.
52	12	"Starlight Night"	Finding a Simpler Case	Barry Harman; George Arthur Bloom; Kristin Laskas Martin	December 31, 2004 (Note: This episode was first released on Starlight Night VHS/DVD on October 26, 2004.)	CYB049
Hacker tries to destroy the festivities during Cyberspace's favorite holiday, Starlight Night (a mix of Christmas and New Year's Eve in the same day). For Real: "Harry's Home Away from Home" Harry searches for a simpler way to do wake-up calls.

=== Season 4 (2005) ===
This is the last season directed by Larry Jacobs, who had directed every episode up to this point.

No. overall	No. in season	Title	Topic	Written by	Original release date	Prod. code
53	1	"Balancing Act"	Budgeting Money	Barry Harman; George Arthur Bloom; Kristin Laskas Martin	April 15, 2005	CYB056
The Cybersquad helps Sharri Spotter make a film about Frogsnorts while staying within a budget, but Hacker keeps trying to run the up budget by putting himself in the film. For Real: "Harry's Big Date" Harry's cousin, Harley is joining Harry during his date with Jenna, and he's wasting Harry's money during his date in a restaurant.
54	2	"The Icky Factor"	Factoring	Adam Rudman; George Arthur Bloom; Kristin Laskas Martin	July 25, 2005	CYB054
Hacker kidnaps Icky to find a power source to power up his new invention so he can use it to rule over Cyberspace again. For Real: "Harry's School Daze" Harry does his job as a substitute teacher and teaches multiplication for the arrangement of their desk.
55	3	"Penguin Tears"	Angles in Bouncing	Adam Rudman; George Arthur Bloom; Kristin Laskas Martin	July 26, 2005	CYB057
Hacker's secret plan to take over Cyberworld by using the electric eel's energy continues. The missing piece of the puzzle is the Prism of Penguia. Since Emperor Penguia can't remember where he hid the prism, everybody in Penguia has to shed tears until it is found. The Cybersquad & Fluff must face several obstacles, including a booby trap, to "angle" their way out so that nobody no longer has to shed tears. For Real: "Harry Bounces Back" Harry hangs out with his annoying cousin Harley, they play racquetball, and later 8-ball.
56	4	"Past Perfect Prediction"	Data Prediction	Dave Dias; George Arthur Bloom; Kristin Laskas Martin	July 27, 2005	CYB059
Slider's father owes Hacker a debt, and if they don't pay up in time, Hacker will steal and take over his father's garage. For Real: "Harry Gets Nosey" Harry thinks keeps sneezing because he has the flu, but it turns out he's allergic to cats.
57	5	"Measure for Measure"	Units of Measurement	Ronnie Krauss; George Arthur Bloom; Kristin Laskas Martin	July 28, 2005	CYB061
Hacker's new invention is revealed, and is ready to create chaos. For Real: "Bianca Doesn't Measure Up" Bianca auditions for a cooking show by making a sponge cake, but fails and believes Kelly's oven is broken.
58	6	"A Change of Art"	Line Graph Comparisons	Ronnie Krauss; George Arthur Bloom; Kristin Laskas Martin	October 3, 2005	CYB058
Hacker plans to use statues of himself to cause a power outage everywhere. For Real: "Harry the Hoser" Harry does a test to do his job as a firefighter.
59	7	"The Case of the Missing Memory"	Missing Information	Louise Gikow; George Arthur Bloom; Kristin Laskas Martin	October 4, 2005	CYB055
Motherboard's memory integrator has been stolen, so Digit and the Cybersquad need to find out what it looks like and who stole it. For Real: "Bianca's Open and Shut Case" Bianca imagines she's a detective trying to find a missing bird.
60	8	"A Crinkle in Time"	Gears	Ronnie Krauss; George Arthur Bloom; Kristin Laskas Martin	October 5, 2005 (Note: This episode was first released on EcoHaven CSE VHS/DVD on August 23, 2005.)	CYB053
Slider gets kidnapped by Hacker and is brought to Tick Tockia. The Cybersquad must save their friend from the Hacker. For Real: "Bianca Gets in Gear" Bianca learns about how gears work on Bicycles.
61	9	"A Broom of One's Own"	Time/Distance/Speed	Ronnie Krauss; George Arthur Bloom; Kristin Laskas Martin	October 6, 2005	CYB060
Wicked builds some Broom and stated that it's a Cybersquad Seal of Approval, even though they didn't even test them. Jackie, Matt and Inez test out the brooms to see if they are faster. For Real: "Bianca's Need for Speed" Bianca wins a glamorous movie premiere, but it's on the same day as her little cousin's birthday party.
62	10	"A Tikiville Turkey Day"	Patterns in Nature	Louise Gikow; George Arthur Bloom; Kristin Laskas Martin	October 7, 2005	CYB062
When Hacker steals the legendary Egg of Benedicta, the kids need to get the egg back from Hacker. For Real: "Bianca Learns to Nurture Nature" Bianca wants to learn how to take care of plants because she doesn't want to commit herbicide again.

=== Season 5 (2006–07) ===
During the season, a special two-hour program, "Cyberchase: My Big Idea!" was broadcast. The program comprised episodes 64–67 shown sequentially, and was built around the theme of inventions. Each episode covered a different invention topic. The program was hosted by Bianca and Harry from Cyberchase For Real! and in between episodes, they talked about inventions that were made by kids, and showed clips of kids who had made inventions of their own.

Len Carlson, the original voice of Buzz, died in 2006, and the episode "EcoHaven Ooze" was dedicated to him. Carlson was replaced about halfway through the season by Philip Williams, who began voicing Buzz starting with "The Halloween Howl". This was the last season that was animated by Nelvana Limited and the last one traditionally animated, before moving over to Flash animation by PiP Animation Services, starting with season six.

All episodes this season were directed by Jason Groh.

No. overall	No. in season	Title	Topic	Written by	Original release date	Prod. code
63	1	"The Halloween Howl"	Division	Adam Rudman; George Arthur Bloom	October 31, 2006	CYB071
The annual "Halloween Howl" bash in Castleblanca promises to be spooktacular… until Hacker takes over the Mayor's Castle and brings its seven stone gargoyles to life. Obeying Hacker's every command, the gargoyles capture the Mayor and imprison him in the dungeon. To gain control of the creepy creatures, the Cybersquad must figure out how to use division to evenly split up bunches of garlic and rock candy. But can they do it in time to rescue the Mayor and save The Halloween Howl? Meanwhile, Inez and Jackie are having a problem with their friendship after a misunderstanding. For Real: "Bianca Hallo-whines" October 31 is Bianca's favorite day of the year, as it is not only Halloween, but also her birthday. However, Bianca is unhappy when she has to look over two of her young friends, Erica and Leah. Her moods improves when Erica and Leah divide up the Halloween candy they receive.
64	2	"A Clean Sweep"	Inventions: Persistence	Louise Gikow; George Arthur Bloom	November 27, 2006	CYB063
Buzz opens up a new doughnut shop in Radopolis. Hacker's magnetite confetti he collects is large enough to remove the memory of every single citizen of Radopolis and send them to sleep.The Cybersquad needs to design a confetti collector so they can spoil Hacker & save Radopolis before it's too late when he dominates Radopolis and renames it Hackerville. For Real: "Harry Gets Blindsided" Harry invents his very own remote-controlled Venetian blinds, but it ends up controlling his neighbour's blinds too.
65	3	"Designing Mr. Perfect"	Inventions: Design for Function	Ronnie Krauss; George Arthur Bloom	November 28, 2006	CYB064
The Wicked Witch of Happily-Ever-Afterville turns Digit into her husband. Wanda (guest star Danica Mckellar), enlists the CyberSquad on a mission to Terra Swampa to rescue Digit. But first, they need to design an invention to help them get across the swamp. For Real: "Harry on the Rise" Harry tries to build something to make his cart ride up the stairs.
66	4	"EcoHaven Ooze"	Inventions: Testing with Models	Dan Elish; George Arthur Bloom	November 29, 2006	CYB066
When Hacker takes all the Ooze from EcoHaven for himself, Inez, Jackie, Matt, Digit and Wigit must find a way to shoo Hacker away before the EcoHaven animals lose their energy. For Real: "Harry Talks Trash" After having his birthday party, Harry needs to invent something to get rid of all the trash in his apartment.
67	5	"The Fairy Borg Father"	Inventions: Refine and Optimize	Adam Rudman; George Arthur Bloom	November 30, 2006	CYB067
Delete is having a bad day. But things appear to brighten up when Zanko, a fairy borgfather, comes to grant Delete 9 wishes. Due to Delete's wish about bunnies, almost everybody in Cyberspace becomes bunnies. The only way to turn everyone back into themselves is for the Cybersquad to save Zanko's ladle and for Delete to sacrifice his final wish. For Real: "Bianca's Dogged Pursuit" Bianca needs to figure how to feed her dog, Mojo, before she goes to Philadelphia with her friend Kelly on Saturday.
68	6	"The Flying Parallinis"	Parallelograms	Ronnie Krauss; George Arthur Bloom	April 16, 2007	CYB065
Hacker kidnaps Jackie atop Mount Wayupthere; the rest of the Cybersquad must rescue her after meeting a Parallini named Teeny Weeny in their search for the elusive Diamond Joe, the mysterious figure who holds the secret to Jackie's release. For Real: "Bianca Extends Her Reach" Bianca goes skateboarding, but she breaks her ankle and needs to figure out how to reach items without walking.
69	7	"Crystal Clear"	Crystals	Ronnie Krauss; George Arthur Bloom	April 17, 2007	CYB072
Digit is malfunctioning, Motherboard sends the Cybersquad to get his Synchronium crystal and fix him. For Real: "Bianca Gets Crystal Clear" Bianca and her little cousin, Antonio, learn everything about crystals.
70	8	"Inside Hacker"	Robotic Reasoning	Adam Rudman; George Arthur Bloom	April 18, 2007	CYB068
Jackie, Inez and Digit shrink Matt so he can get inside Hacker so he can change back into his good guy form. For Real: "Bianca's Rage Against the Machine" Bianca begins her work at a hospital and soon sees a robot in the hospital.
71	9	"On the Line"	Properties of a Line	Ronnie Krauss; George Arthur Bloom	April 19, 2007	CYB069
When Hacker manages to get his NIC card back, the Cybersquad must get it back and dispose it before Hacker is able to use his Transformatron again. For Real: "Harry Walks the Line" Harley offers Harry two tickets to a Yankees game, and tells him to meet each other at the drug store.
72	10	"A Fraction of a Chance"	Fractions 101	Louise Gikow; George Arthur Bloom	September 3, 2007	CYB070
When the Cybersquad returns home from a meeting, Motherboard's portal glitches making them stuck in the vortex. Digit and Wicked work together to find the UVO (Universal Vortex Opener) before the Cybersquad permanently dematerializes! For Real: "Harry's Sweet Job" Harry becomes the manager of a Chocolate shop and soon hires his annoying cousin Harley to work with him when an employee, Margaret, is sick.

=== Season 6 (2007–08) ===
This is the first season to use Flash animation.

This is the first season where Buzz is voiced by Philip Williams from beginning to end.

All episodes this season were directed by Brandon Lloyd.

No. overall	No. in season	Title	Topic	Written by	Original release date	Prod. code
73	1	"Digit's B-Day Surprise"	Reading a Thermometer	Ronnie Krauss; George Arthur Bloom	November 7, 2007	CYB073
Hacker tries to ruin Digit's birthday party, though Digit thinks it's actually for Judge Trudy (since that was how the secret was kept from him). For Real: "Harry Chills Out" While playing tennis during the heat, Harry loses repeatedly to his obnoxious cousin Harley. Note: Clips are shown from "Balancing Act" and "Past Perfect Prediction" from Season 4.
74	2	"When Penguins Fly"	Population Sampling	Dave Dias; George Arthur Bloom	December 12, 2007	CYB074
On the only special night each year, the penguins of Penguia lose their ability to fly. The CyberSquad must get the penguins ice-shoes to climb out before midnight, to stay close to estimates, and to save the holiday. For Real: "Harry's New Year's Eve Countdown": Harry wants to start off New Year's Eve by counting of estimate of people contest to find a camera for the prize.
75	3	"Unhappily Ever After"	Builders' Math: Measurement, Geometry	Jon Greenberg; George Arthur Bloom	February 19, 2008	CYB075
Hacker destroys three boxes covering the Book of Unhappy Endings, and releases the Unhappy Endings. The CyberSquad must return the book by sundown. For Real: "Bianca Busts a Move": Bianca is going to be in a talent show; her friend Rodney is teaching her an awesome dance routine, along with her friend Robert.
76	4	"Escape from Merlin's Maze"	Builders' Math: Algebraic Thinking	Claudia Silver; George Arthur Bloom	February 20, 2008	CYB076
When Hacker descends into the Frogsnorts School of Sorcery, he schemes to steal Professor Stumblesnore's wand. He subsequently traps Shari Spotter when she is tasked to stop him. The Cybersquad is tasked to use algebraic thinking skills in order to solve the maze's clues, to rescue Shari, and to prevent Hacker from stealing the wand. For Real: "Bianca's Ups and Downs" Bianca and her niece learns about the seesaw as a machine consisting of a lever and fulcrum.
77	5	"Step by Step"	Builders' Math: Multi-Step Problem Solving	George Arthur Bloom	February 21, 2008	CYB077
Hacker captures Dr. Marbles and puts him in a faraway volcano, so it's up to the kids to save him. For Real: "Penned In" Harley convinces Harry to help him by putting the fence for their grandmother.
78	6	"Team Spirit"	Math in Sports: Number and Operation	Ronnie Krauss; George Arthur Bloom	April 8, 2008	CYB079
The Cybersquad prepares to compete in Zeus' Mount Olympus games. For Real: "Harry Makes a Big Splash" Harry and his cousin Harley's friend Joe prepare to swim as a team in a relay race and give a good sport for swimming pool lessons.
79	7	"Jimaya Jam"	Math in Sports: Representation	Dave Dias; George Arthur Bloom	April 9, 2008	CYB080
The Cybersquad uses diagrams to get out of a basketball-like game called Jimaya Jam. For Real: "Bianca's Hoop" Bianca's niece Alicia to fill in as coach on a basketball team, but Bianca doesn't know to redo basketball coaching instead. She helps how to use a diagram can help illustrate the play clearly and effectively.
80	8	"A Perfect Score" "Perfect Score"	Math in Sports: Scoring Performance	Brian Meehl; George Arthur Bloom	April 10, 2008	CYB081
Jackie must be Hacker's partner in a dance competition. For Real: "Bianca Cheers Up" Bianca's friend Natalie is nervous to see and try out the cheerleading squad; Bianca tries to give the tryouts in Natalie's performance worked out to give effectively on sports.
81	9	"Chaos as Usual"	Math in Sports: Data Collection	Brian Meehl; George Arthur Bloom	April 11, 2008	CYB078
CyberSquad joins the Slugball Open baseball team, but Hacker can hardly wait to delete the data and create chaos before they stopped and cause disruptive the game leadership. For Real: "Harry Cries Foul" Harry scores a job at Shea Stadium with his favorite baseball team, the New York Mets.
82	10	"Spheres of Fears"	Circle Diameter and Circumference	Adam Rudman; George Arthur Bloom	October 27, 2008	CYB082
Hacker traps Digit and the kids in one of the dreaded Spheres of Fears, a mini-galaxy of orbs populated by eerie creatures called Creepers, before the evil scheme causes chaos and escapes their Sphere. For Real: "Simple as Pie": Bianca's best friend Kelly decide to go to the bakery for pie diameter size then she will sell them.

=== Season 7 (2009) ===
In the first two episodes, "For Real" segments included Janice Huff, a meteorologist with New York's WNBC-TV who played "Stormy Gale" in episodes 83–84.

All episodes this season were directed by Brandon Lloyd.

No. overall	No. in season	Title	Topic	Written by	Original release date	Prod. code
83	1	"Weather Watchers" "Gone With The Fog"	Math in Weather: Fog	Jonathan Greenberg, George Arthur Bloom	April 20, 2009	CYB083
The Cybersquad must figure out dew point to make a rescue under fog. For Real: "Harry's in a Fog" Harry meets a new friend Anita then both learn how to keep track of his temperature.
84	2	"The Emperor Has Snow Clothes"	Math in Weather: Tracking Storms	Claudia Silver, George Arthur Bloom	April 21, 2009	CYB084
The kids track a powerful storm to save the Emperor of Penguia. For Real: "Harry Reigns" Harry goes camping before the storm hits while calling his friend, the meteorologist Janice Huff. Guest starring: Janice Huff as Stormy Gale.
85	3	"The X-Factor"	Math in Weather: Multiplication Power	Ronnie Krauss, George Arthur Bloom	April 22, 2009	CYB085
A harmless act multiplied hundreds of times creates a huge problem. For Real: "Bianca Saves the Planet" Bianca meets up with Kelly for an Earth Day rally, however, she solves to look for a big solutions can be multiplied the same way.
86	4	"Blowin' in the Wind" "Blowin in the Wind"	Math in Weather: Measuring Wind Speed	Ronnie Krauss, George Arthur Bloom	April 23, 2009	CYB086
The Cybersquad must measure and compare wind speeds to find the cure to Motherboard's virus. For Real: "Bianca Goes Where the Wind Blows" Bianca gives Alicia a kite while the wind blows of measure in time.
87	5	"Father's Day"	Patterns in Codes	Adam Rudman, George Arthur Bloom	June 19, 2009	CYB087
After Hacker replaces Max, Creech's dad, he reveals his newest invention — The Decode-A-Tron, while the CyberSquad finds the secret code and now what it is. For Real: "Harley Gets the Hint" After Harley kicks out an apartment, he uses a code for making noise with Harry. Guest Starring: Matthew Broderick as Max.
88	6	"The Deedle Beast"	Observing and Tracking Animal Behavior	Claudia Silver, George Arthur Bloom	October 5, 2009	CYB088
Digit pet-sits Dewey, a Deedle Beast who suddenly starts going berserk on his daily walk. For Real: "Harry's Dogged Pursuit" When Harry takes care of Harley's dog, it starts barking every morning for no apparent reason.
89	7	"Spellbound"	Grids	Chris Nee, George Arthur Bloom	October 6, 2009	CYB089
Wicked casts a spell while CyberSquad is using grids. For Real: "Bianca Pigs Out" Bianca wants to make a stuffed animal. Meanwhile, she encounters her niece Alicia, she shows how to enlarge the pattern using a grid.

=== Season 8 (2010) ===
This is the last season directed by Brandon Lloyd, who had directed every episode up to this point. This is also the last season based on mathematical concepts.

No. overall	No. in season	Title	Topic	Written by	Original release date	Prod. code
90	1	"The Hacker's Challenge"	Solution by Trying Numbers	Allan Neuwirth	June 25, 2010	CYB090
For Real: "Harry Gets Locked Up"
91	2	"Face-Off!"	Analyzing Ads (Reasoning)	Jonathan Greenberg	July 2, 2010	CYB093
For Real: "Bianca Sells Out"
92	3	"Peace, Love, and Hackerness"	Measuring with Mixed Number Fractions	Adam Rudman	July 9, 2010	CYB094
When Hacker blasts the pole of the Far-Out radio, it's up to the Cyber Squad to save Cyberspace before the radio dies. For Real: "Help Wanted for Bianca"
93	4	"Hackerized!"	Analyzing Data	Ronnie Krauss	July 16, 2010	CYB091
Hacker has set up a "Hackerizing" machine in Sensible Flats. The machine pumps out a fog that makes them develop the personality and behavior of Hacker himself. A newcomer, Ledge, helps coach the Cybersquad on scaling the rock wall on a practice set, but in reality controls the "Hackerizing" machine instead of Hacker. For Real: "Harry's Feet Compete"
94	5	"The Bluebird of Zappiness"	Proportional reasoning	Ronnie Krauss	July 23, 2010	CYB092
For Real: "Beyond a Shadow of a Doubt"; Guest starring: Alex Karzis as Ledge, Kristina Nicoll as Motherboard, Julie Lemieux as Artemis and Punxie, Katie Griffin as Lily, and Philip Williams as Grand Groundhoggian.

=== Season 9 (2013–14) ===
On April 3, 2013, it was announced on the official Facebook page that the series would return for a ninth season. The season premiered November 4, 2013, after being on hiatus since 2010. Issues in development for episode 95 caused some versions of the aired episode to air with the title "placeholder" cards in place. e.g. act 1, act 2, and act 3. In this season, Harley, Alicia, and Harry (from For Real) now work at Camp Henry teaching 8-year-old kids about the environment. Season 9 was animated in Flash by Pip Animation in Ottawa.

All episodes this season were directed by J. Meeka Stuart.

This is the last season to be in Fullscreen.

No. overall	No. in season	Title	Topic	Written by	Original release date	Prod. code
95	1	"An Urchin Matter"	Keystone Species and Kelp-Bed Ecosystem	Peter K. Hirsch; George Arthur Bloom	November 4, 2013	CYB095
The Cybersquad must figure out what is causing kelp from Mega Bay to rise to the top. Meanwhile, Hacker looks make some profit by putting on a show for Cyberspace to see, after watching a viral video on CyberTube, a Cyberspace version of YouTube. The kids must free the sea otters before the whole kelp forest becomes destroyed by sea urchins. For Real: Harry Restores Balance" Harry helps Harley become a better camp director, by teaching him and the kids about balance in the ecosystem.
96	2	"Going Solar"	Solar Panels	Dave Dias; George Arthur Bloom	November 5, 2013	CYB096
Hacker has challenged Slider to a skate-off. But suddenly, the power to the brand new stadium goes out. The Cybersquad must find a way to harness solar energy, store it, and makes sure it lasts through the game. However, someone keeps sabotaging their plans. The show must go on! For Real: "Harry's Got The Power" Alicia, Harry's camp coworker devises a game about Solar energy. Meanwhile, Harry is waiting by his phone to win a jet ski.
97	3	"Trash Creep"	Fractions, Effects of Trash, and Recycling	Dan Elish; George Arthur Bloom	November 6, 2013	CYB097
The team battles a giant garbage heap in Perfectomundo, which threatens to break through the cybersite dome; Hacker seeks to grow an army of monster plants to take over the cyberworld. For Real: "Harley's Trash Is Harry's Treasure" Harry creates the game "Trash Dash" to deal with the camp's garbage issue, while Harley tries to get out of doing his work.
98 99	4 5	"The Cyberchase Movie"	Living Space	Adam Rudman; George Arthur Bloom	April 15, 2014 (standalone premiere) April 21, 2014; April 22, 2014 (as two-part special)	CYB098 CYB099 CYB100
Hacker wishes to build Hackerspace by drilling on Ecotopia. He captured an aged Doctor Marbles and stole his journal to help him locate the Reformat Button. In searching for the button, Buzz and Delete capture Ollie's mom Abby, and accidentally drill into the inner slime core. Hacker locks Dr. Marbles and Abby away while he recalculates the location of the button. Motherboard sends the Cybersquad into Ecotopia to investigate where the slime came from, and what they can do to help. They soon realize that many of the animals of the Cybersite have lost their homes due to the slime destroying most of the Preserve. To fix this, they must relocate the animals and install a new preserve that allows them to live comfortably. Using an ark, they are able to bring the animals to the new preserve, but by just narrowly escaping a whirlpool. Soon after, the Cybersquad and Ollie notice that the orangutans are in the wrong portion of the preserve. To figure out why, Inez and Ollie return to the old preserve and examine the wildlife. But to do so, Inez must overcome her fear of bats and Ollie must overcome his fear of heights. If that wasn't enough, they overhear Hacker looking for the button and realize he has caused the inner slime core to erupt. Ollie spots his mother with Hacker, so he desperately wants to save her. The Cybersquad and Ollie formulate a plan that succeeds in rescuing Dr. Marbles and Abby, while installing a lock on the Reformat Button, thus ejecting Hacker into Cyberspace. The movie finishes with Inez and Ollie enjoying a sandwich high up in a tree. For Real: Harry shows 100 favorite moments of the series in honor of the 100th episode of Cyberchase. Note: This is an hour-long two-part special. Guests starring: Emilie-Claire Barlow as Abby, Richard Binsley as Dr. Marbles, Kristina Nicoll as Motherboard. Modern Family star Rico Rodriguez as Ollie, also guest starred.

=== Season 10 (2015) ===
All episodes this season were directed by J. Meeka Stuart.

The opening sequence has been updated to look consistent with the Flash animation.

This is the first season to be in 16:9 widescreen.

No. overall	No. in season	Title	Topic	Written by	Original release date	Prod. code
100	1	"Fit to be Heroes"	Exercise Goals	Adam Rudman; George Arthur Bloom	November 9, 2015	CYB101
Scanner helps the Cybersquad build a new encryptor chip for Motherboard to cure her virus. For Real: "It's a Dog's Life for Harry"
101	2	"A Recipe for Chaos"	Nutrition	George Arthur Bloom; Peter K. Hirsch	November 10, 2015	CYB102
Trouble is brewing from Castleblanca when a new restaurant - Bogey's - opens, serving unhealthy dishes in Hacker packets. Hacker has recently opened a factory to sell these products, leading to Digit challenging him in a cook-off. For Real: "Harry Vegges Out"
102	3	"A Seedy Business"	Gardening/Nutrition	Adam Rudman; George Arthur Bloom	November 11, 2015	CYB103
The CyberSquad first investigates why Hacker has saved the cybersite Factoria. It is subsequently revealed that Hacker not only forced the Factorians into making toy helicopters (which were secret spy copters to conquer the CyberWorld), but also forced them to make free meals known as "junk food" that are freely distributed in vending machines. The CyberSquad then builds a colorful, healthy garden to counter the vending machines. For Real: "Harry and Bianca Grow Green"
103	4	"Parks and Recreation"	Evidence-based Arguments	P. Kevin Strader; George Arthur Bloom	November 12, 2015	CYB104
Hacker plans to create the Gollywood Tower to bring chaos to Cyberspace. The only way for the Cybersquad to stop Hacker from taking over cyberworld is by stating that parks & playgrounds are reasonable. For Real: "Bianca's Wish on a Fish"
104	5	"Bottled Up"	Plastic Disposal	Susan Kim; George Arthur Bloom	November 13, 2015	CYB105
The CyberSquad goes to visit Slider in Radopolis, but Way Cool Arena is getting clogged with water bottles. The Cybersquad and Slider must figure out a way to stop this before Radopolis is filled with empty bottles. For Real: "Harry's Fashion Nonsense"

=== Season 11 (2017–18) ===
All episodes this season were directed by J. Meeka Stuart.

No. overall	No. in season	Title	Topic	Written by	Original release date	Prod. code
105	1	"Watts of Halloween Trouble"	Energy Conservation	Adam Rudman	October 23, 2017	CYB106
It's Halloween Haunt-O-Rama in R-Fair City, and Hacker has a wicked treat up his sleeve: to keep the kids out of Cyberspace forever by crashing Motherboard's portal system. But when Buzz and Delete make a mistake, the portal system crashes too late, trapping the CyberSquad and Digit in R-Fair City.
106	2	"Creech's Creature Quandary"	Habitat Fragmentation	Jill Cozza-Turner	December 26, 2017	CYB107
107	3	"A Murky Mystery in Mermaidos"	Thermal Pollution	Joey Mazzarino	December 27, 2017	CYB108
108	4	"Plantasaurus!"	Air Quality	Adam Rudman	December 28, 2017	CYB109
The CyberSquad has a slumber party to commemorate the renovation of Motherboard and Digit's place. However, the lack of plants makes everyone sick, so they go to Gnome Depot (a parody of Home Depot) to get the plants. Unfortunately, Buzz and Delete steal a majority of the plants in an attempt to create a massive Plantasaurus to seize control of Cyberspace from Motherboard.
109	5	"A Reboot Eve to Remember"	Wind Energy	Peter K. Hirsch	December 29, 2017	CYB110
110	6	"Housewarming Party"	Green Roofs (Natural Thermal Insulation)	Jennifer Hamburg	April 16, 2018	CYB111
111	7	"Invasion of the Funky Flower"	Invasive Species	Joey Mazzarino	April 17, 2018	CYB112
Hacker plots a revenge when he loses to Inez at the annual flower-growing contest.
112	8	"A Renewable Hope"	Renewable Energy	Adam Rudman	April 18, 2018	CYB113
Hacker enlists the help of the CyberSquad to get back home.
113	9	"The Migration Situation"	Citizen Science	Jennifer Hamburg	April 19, 2018	CYB114
Digit and Professor Bob, both experts in teal-footed trillers, organize a celebration to witness their bidecadal migration. But Hacker captured the trillers and replaced them with robotic fakes to use their song to unlock a book containing the secrets to Cyberspace!
114	10	"Back to Canalia's Future"	Water Consumption	Jill Cozza-Turner	April 20, 2018	CYB115
The Cybersquad and their friend Pearl spread the water problem in Canalia.

=== Season 12 (2019–20) ===
All episodes this season were directed by J. Meeka Stuart.

No. overall	No. in season	Title	Written by	Original release date	Prod. code
115 116	1 2	"Space Waste Odyssey"	Adam Rudman	April 19, 2019 November 29, 2019 (as two-part special)	CYB117 CYB118
It is Motherboard's birthday, but not all is well. The CyberSquad must save Cyberspace on their own when a malfunction renders Motherboard powerless, while the Hacker attempts to crush Control Central between two giant Trash vortexes. They must reboot Motherboard, move the Control Central, and throw a birthday party for Motherboard.
117	3	"Giving Thanks Day"	Jill Cozza-Turner	November 22, 2019	CYB116
The CyberSquad is excited to celebrate Giving Thanks Day with Jackie's pumpkin pie, but there's a big problem -- Hacker has taken all the pristine produce. Guest starring: Lilly Bartlam as Hacker's niece, Harmony.
118	4	"A Garden Grows in Botlyn"	Jennifer Hamburg	February 14, 2020	CYB119
Ren and the CyberSquad use their math skills to plant a garden in an unlikely space. Meanwhile, Hacker receives an unexpected valentine.
119	5	"Missing Bats in Sensible Flats"	Adam Rudman	April 17, 2020	CYB120
Digit's cousin, Brigit, thinks a lack of bats is the reason the flowering cactus plants are not bearing any apple cactus fruit.
120	6	"Water Woes"	Adam Rudman	April 17, 2020	CYB121
Buzz and Delete enlist the CyberSquad to figure out why the water supply at Mount Bear Fresh Water Spa has stopped flowing, which the CyberSquad teams up with to figure out the problem.
121	7	"Soil Turmoil"	Jennifer Hamburg	April 17, 2020	CYB122
The team shrink to the size of tiny insects to try to help their earthworm friend Hapo figure out what is damaging his soil.
122	8	"Hacker Hugs a Tree"	Adam Rudman	April 17, 2020	CYB123
In an unlikely pairing, the CyberSquad helps Hacker stop a new villain, Zusk, who is zapping trees with his Tree X1. After Zusk leaves due to no longer having power, Hacker uses Zusk's Tree X to plant new trees in the Northern Frontier Forest.
123	9	"Pursuit of the Prism of Power"	Jill Cozza-Turner	May 8, 2020	CYB124
The CyberSquad faces monsters, canyons, and cliffs as they pursue the Prism of Power, a vital piece of Motherboard's operating system that Hacker has stolen.
124	10	"Composting in the Clutch"	Louie Lazar	May 8, 2020	CYB125
Hacker suctions up all the dirt in Dingerville Park just before The Dingerball Series -- a once-in-every-four-year championship -- leaving CyberSquad scrambling to refill the missing dirt before the big game starts.
125	11	"A Camping Conundrum"	Jennifer Hamburg	May 8, 2020	CYB126
Matt, Inez, Digit and Jackie are enjoying their camping trip in the wilderness until Digit's Power Pal 3000 -- a cooking-heating-entertainment center all in one -- shuts down.
126	12	"Journey of a Thousand Food Miles"	Jennifer Hamburg	May 8, 2020	CYB127
Jackie and Inez search everywhere for cherries so Digit can make his famous cherry supreme dessert for food critic Bone Appetit. Howwver, Hacker claims the last batch of cherries of the season to make "Cherries a la Hacker."

=== Season 13 (2022) ===
This is the final season where Gilbert Gottfried provides the voice of Digit before his death on April 12, 2022.

No. overall	No. in season	Title	Written by	Original release date	Prod. code
127	1	"Duck Stop"	Adam Rudman	February 25, 2022	CYB128
The CyberSquad tags along as the Northern Frontier ducks migrate to Restoria, helping the flock avoid numerous hazards along the way.
128	2	"The Great Outdoors"	Billy Aronson	February 25, 2022	CYB129
The CyberSquad investigates a mysterious creature that tramples over Crestwood Park, leaving visitors too scared to enter.
129	3	"Coral Grief"	Louie Lazar	February 25, 2022	CYB130
The CyberSquad and Digit try to find the source that is heating up the ocean waters and bleaching the coral reef.
130	4	"Sustainable by Design"	Rodney Stringfellow	February 25, 2022	CYB131
Jackie wins a chance to apprentice with fashion designer Fabio DeZine and learns it takes more than a pretty drawing to design something that makes a sustaining impact.
131	5	"Hacker's Bright Idea"	Monique D. Hall	April 29, 2022	CYB132
The CyberSquad awaits the return of Kacy's Comet, but a glaring light in the sky blocks out all the stars. Note: This is the first episode released following Gottfried’s death, which occurred two weeks earlier.
132	6	"Buzz and the Tree"	Adam Rudman & George Arthur Bloom	April 29, 2022	CYB133
It's Arbor Day in Cyberspace, but Buzz is more interested in his video game than planting a tree, so Delete calls on the CyberSquad for help.
133	7	"The Lilting Loons"	Adam Rudman	April 29, 2022	CYB134
The CyberSquad investigates after the Lilting Loons of Botsberg go missing and their pond is replaced by trash.
134	8	"Living in Disharmony"	Liz Hara	April 29, 2022	CYB135
Hacker's niece Harmony returns to the Northern Frontier with a new pet, Sparkletoes, which quickly outstays his welcome.
135	9	"Traffic Trouble"	Louie Lazar	May 20, 2022	CYB136
The Dingerville Dragons need to get around traffic so they can get to the field to practice.
136	10	"A Garden Is Born"	Louie Lazar	May 20, 2022	CYB137
Judge Trudy's prized Prickly Peach Cacti goes missing. Meanwhile, Buzz and Delete build their own garden. Note: This is the last episode where Gilbert Gottfried voices Digit, as he died on April 12, 2022, from cardiovascular disorder.

=== Season 14 (2023) ===
Following Gilbert Gottfried's death on April 12, 2022, Ron Pardo now provides the voice of Digit. The episode "Clean-Up on Isle 8" was dedicated to Gottfried.

No. overall	No. in season	Title	Written by	Original release date	Prod. code
137	1	"Clean-Up on Isle 8"	Alonzo Cisneros & Jesenia Ruiz	April 21, 2023	CYB138
138	2	"Trees, Please"	Jesenia Ruiz	April 28, 2023 (Note: This episode first premiered on the PBS Kids video app on April 21, 2023.)	CYB139
139	3	"Weather or Not"	Monique D. Hall	May 10, 2023; May 11, 2023 (as two-part special)	CYB140
140 (Note: This episode is an hour-long special.)	4	"Weather or Not"	Monique D. Hall	May 10, 2023; May 11, 2023 (as two-part special)	CYB141

=== Season 15 (2024) ===
This is the final season where Phillip Williams provides the voice of Buzz before his death on September 8, 2024.

No. overall	No. in season	Title	Written by	Original release date	Prod. code
141	1	"If You Can't Stand the Heat"	Liz Hara	April 27, 2024	CYB142
142	2	"Cyberdillos in the Outfield"	Jesenia Ruiz	April 27, 2024	CYB143
143	3	"Hacker's Birthday Bash"	Adam Rudman	April 27, 2024	CYB144
144	4	"The Domino Dilemma"	Rodney Stringfellow	April 27, 2024	CYB145
145	5	"A Berry Special Mother's Day"	Louie Lazar	May 11, 2024	CYB146
146	6	"A Fungus Among Us"	Liz Hara	May 25, 2024	CYB147
147	7	"The Kite Flying Showdown"	Joe Purdy	May 25, 2024	CYB148
148	8	"The Heat Beneath Your Feet"	Jesenia Ruiz	May 25, 2024	CYB149

=== Season 16 (2026) ===
Peter Cugno provides the role as Buzz following the death of Phillip Williams on September 8, 2024.

No. overall	No. in season	Title	Written by	Original release date	Prod. code
149	1	"Fix It Time!"	Monique D. Hall	April 18, 2026 (Note: This episode was first released on Youtube on April 10, 2026.)	1601
150	2	"Leave the Leaves"	Jehan Madhani	April 18, 2026 (Note: This episode was first released on Youtube on April 17, 2026.)	1603
151	3	"Be There or Be Cyber Square"	Shelley Acosta Smith	May 16, 2026 (Note: This episode was first released on Youtube on May 8, 2026.)	1602
152	4	"The Power of Patterns"	Joon Chung	May 16, 2026	1605
153	5	"A Vote for Belly Bowl Captain"	Louie Lazar	June 6, 2026	1604
154	6	"Take it Away"	TBA	TBA	TBA
155	7	"Weigh to Go"	TBA	TBA	TBA

== Home media ==
=== DVD/VHS ===
Between 2004 and 2005, five Cyberchase titles were released on DVD and VHS. Each DVD release of the titles contained three episodes.

Cyberchase home video releases
Season		Episodes	Release dates
Season		Episodes	United States
1	2002	26	Codename Icky: August 3, 2004; Episode(s) featured: "Of All the Luck" • "Codename: Icky" Totally Rad!: August 3, 2004; Episode(s) featured: "Fortress of Attitude" Starlight Night: October 26, 2004; Episode(s) featured: "Snow Day to Be Exact"
2	2003	14	Codename Icky: August 3, 2004; Episode(s) featured: "Harriet Hippo and the Mean Green" Totally Rad!: August 3, 2004; Episode(s) featured: "Totally Rad!" Starlight Night: October 26, 2004; Episode(s) featured: "A Time to Cook" The Snelfu Snafu: March 29, 2005; Episode(s) featured: "The Wedding Scammer"
3	2004	12	Totally Rad!: August 3, 2004; Episode(s) featured: "The Borg of the Ring" Starlight Night: October 26, 2004; Episode(s) featured: "Starlight Night" The Snelfu Snafu: March 29, 2005; Episode(s) featured: "The Snelfu Snafu" EcoHaven CSE: August 23, 2005; Episode(s) featured: "EcoHaven CSE" • "The Creech Who Would be Crowned"
4	2005	10	EcoHaven CSE: August 23, 2005; Episode(s) featured: "A Crinkle in Time"

=== iTunes ===
iTunes Canada has released the first eight seasons, though they are not always according to the American airdates and use different season numbering. The Canadian releases also do not include the For Real segments, due to them not being included on Canadian airings of Cyberchase on CBC Television, Discovery Kids and the Knowledge Network. iTunes US has a collection of 24 random episodes, a couple of themed collections, and the two specials. See below tables.

Canadian iTunes
Season		Episodes	Release number	Episode count
1	2002	26	1	13
1	2002	26	2	13
2	2003	14	3	14
3	2004	12	4	12
4	2005	10	5	10
5	2006–07	10	6	10
6	2007–08	10	7	12
7	2009	7	7	12
7	2009	7	8	10
8	2010	5	8	10

American iTunes
Season		Episodes	Releases
1	2002	26	Cyberchase; Episode(s) featured: "Castleblanca" • "And They Counted Happily Ever After" • "Clock Like An Egyptian" • "Codename: Icky" Numbers & Data; Episode(s) featured: "Castleblanca" • "And They Counted Happily Ever After"
2	2003	14	Cyberchase; Episode(s) featured: "Totally Rad" • "Double Trouble" • "The Wedding Scammer" • "Trick or Treat" Numbers & Data; Episode(s) featured: "Double Trouble" Fractions & Geometry; Episode(s) featured: "Totally Rad"
3	2004	12	Cyberchase; Episode(s) featured: "EcoHaven CSE" – "A World Without Zero" • "The Creech Who Would Be Crowned" • "Shari Spotter and the Cosmic Crumpets" • "Starlight Night" Numbers & Data; Episode(s) featured: "A World Without Zero" Fractions & Geometry; Episode(s) featured: "The Borg of the Ring" • "Shari Spotter and the Cosmic Crumpets"
4	2005	10	Cyberchase; Episode(s) featured: "The Icky Factor" • "Past Perfect Prediction" • "A Crinkle In Time" – "A Tikiville Turkey Day" Numbers & Data; Episode(s) featured: "Past Perfect Prediction"
5	2006–07	10	Cyberchase; Episode(s) featured: "The Flying Parallinis" – "A Fraction of a Chance" Fractions & Geometry; Episode(s) featured: "The Flying Parallinis" • "A Fraction of a Chance"
6	2007–08	10	—N/a
7	2009	7	Earth Day; Episode(s) featured: "The X-Factor"
8	2010	5	—N/a
9	2013–14	5	Earth Day; Episode(s) featured: "An Urchin Matter" – "Trash Creep" The Cyberchase Movie; Episode(s) featured: "The Cyberchase Movie"
10	2015	5	—N/a
11	2017–18	10	—N/a
12	2019	12	Space Waste Odyssey; Episode(s) featured: "Space Waste Odyssey" Volume 12; Episode(s) featured: "Giving Thanks Day" • "A Garden Grows in Botlyn" • "Water Woes" • "Soil Turmoil" • "Missing Bats in Sensible Flats"
13	2022	10	—N/a

== Streaming ==
The show is available to stream on PBS Kids' official streaming partner, Amazon Prime Video. The For Real segments are omitted on most of the episodes.
