= Cyber =

Cyber- is a prefix derived from 'cybernetic', used in terms relating to computers, technology, networks (including Internet), and others.

Cyber may also refer to:

== Computers ==
- CDC Cyber, a range of mainframe computers

== Arts and entertainment ==
- Cyber (Marvel Comics), a Marvel comics supervillain
- Cyber (Russian: Кибер), a Soviet science-fiction character (see Arkady and Boris Strugatsky's works)
- Doctor Cyber, a DC Comics supervillain
- How to Be a Cyber-Lovah, a 2001 comedy film
- Cyber, a tentative initial title of Blackhat, a 2015 American film
- CSI: Cyber, an American television series
- CY8ER, a five-person EDM idol group

== See also ==
- Centre for Integrative Bee Research (CIBER)
- Cyber City (disambiguation)
- Cybernetics (disambiguation)
  - Cybernetic organism, or cyborg, a being with both organic and biomechatronic body parts
  - Cyberneticist, one who studies cybernetics
- Cyberspace (disambiguation)
- Cyborg (disambiguation)
- Zyber, an Albanian masculine given name
