= David Robo =

French politician (born 1970)

Mayor of Vannes
- Incumbent
- Assumed office 6 April 2011
- Preceded by: François Goulard

Personal details
- Born: 10 June 1970 (age 56)
- Party: Horizons (since 2022)

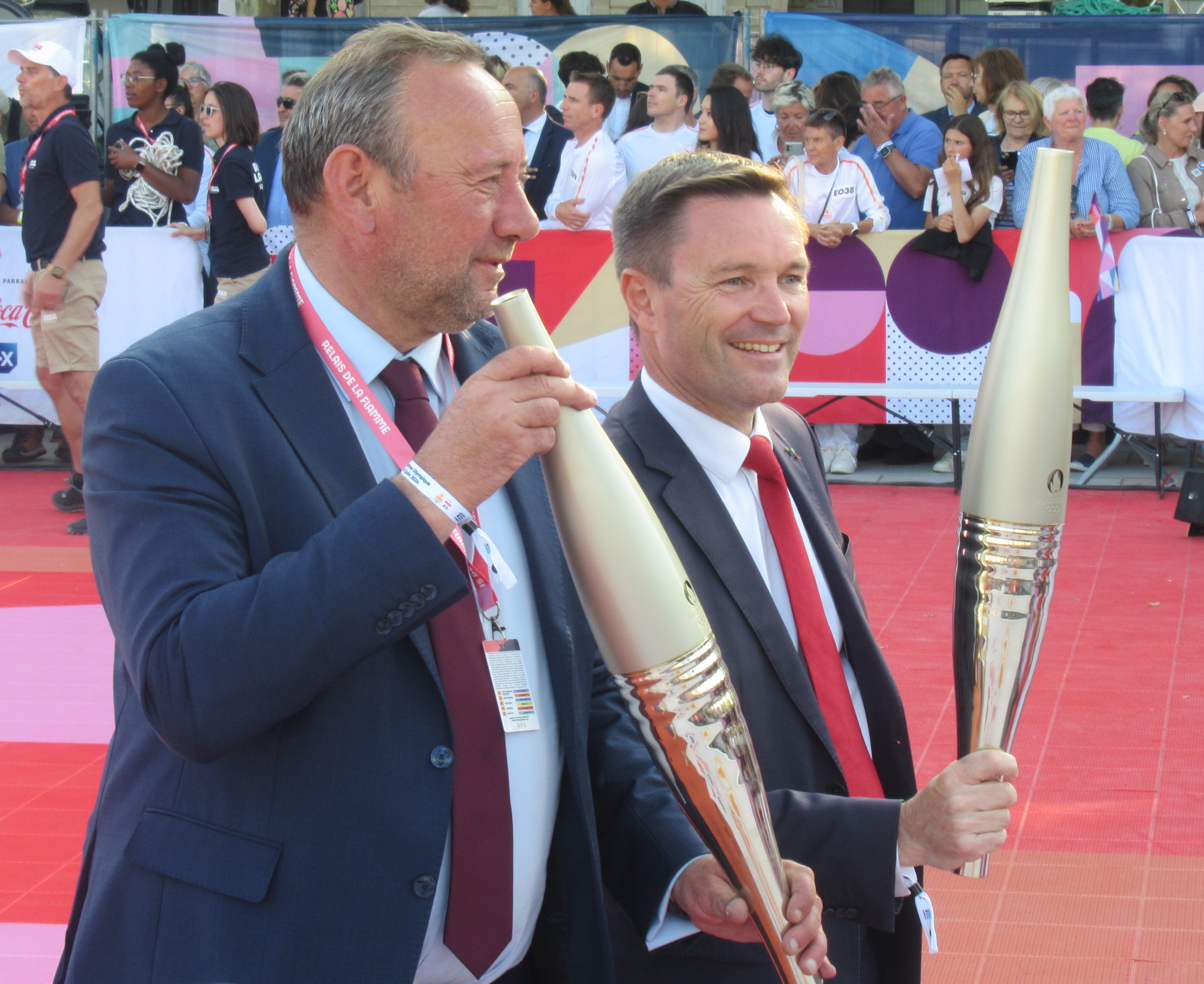
David Robo and David Lappartient during the Paris 2024 Olympic torch relay in Vannes

David Robo (born 10 June 1970) is a French politician serving as mayor of Vannes since 2011. Since 2020, he concurrently serves as president of Golfe du Morbihan - Vannes Agglomération. In the 2015 regional elections, he was elected member of the Regional Council of Brittany.
