= Cyborg (video game) =

1982 video game

- Publisher: Computer Shack
- Platform: TRS-80
- Release: 1982

Cyborg is a video game published in 1982 by Computer Shack for the TRS-80.

== Gameplay ==
Cyborg is a science fiction game in which gladiators compete against each other in a large open testing arena where obstacles and small mazes conceal targets for scoring points.

== Reception ==
Dick McGrath reviewed the game for Computer Gaming World, and stated that "Cyborg is an interesting, challenging arcade game with beautifully smooth action graphics. I give it a 7.5 out of 10."
