= Robotix (toyline) =

Construction toy

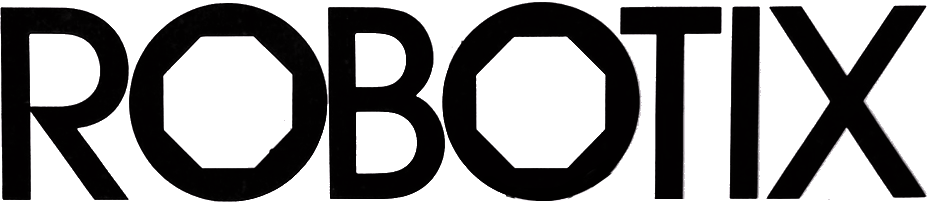
- A 50mm arm piece from the set
- Type: Construction set
- Company: Milton Bradley (1984–86); Learning Curve Brands (1994–2001); Robotics and Things (2001–19); Robotic Rice LLC. (2019–21)
- Country: United States
- Availability: 1984–2021

Robotix was a line of toy motorized modular construction sets used for constructing robotics creatures, vehicles and machines, often including action figures. Robotix toys were first marketed by the Milton Bradley Company (MB) from 1984 until 1986.

The 1985 cartoon series Robotix was based on these toys. During the 1990s and early 2000s, Robotix toys were sold by RC2 Corporation under its Learning Curve brand. Learning Curve changed the colors of the original MB toys from mostly black and white to bright colors, introduced new parts, and expanded the range of playsets.

By 2014, Robotix toys were sold by Robotics and Things, based in Simi Valley, California, which also offered STEM enrichment programs for children.

== Parts ==
Robotix parts, despite originating in the United States, use the metric system of measurement for their pieces. For example, they sell three arm pieces: 50mm Arm, 75mm Arm and 100mm Arm. These parts connect using a male/female attachment system, where each connection is in the shape of an octagon. The toy was high quality for its time of creation, featuring heavy plastics and rounded corners.

== Ownership ==
Robotix toys were sold by the Milton Bradley Company from 1984 until 1994. An animated series of the same name was released in 1985.

Learning Curve Brands began offering Robotix sets in 1994, and continued offering them until 2001. The packaging at this time changed to reflect the Learning Curve name, and many new parts were added. Since 2001, Robotics and Things has continued to sell Robotix toys through the internet. Despite the changes in distribution, the products were fully backward compatible with all toys from 1984 onward.

In 2019, Robotics and Things retired from business and was succeeded by Robotic Rice LLC. Robotic Rice has continued to sell Robotix toys until early 2021, when they have been forced to drop the Robotix product line due to the economic consequences of the COVID-19 pandemic.
