= Robotix =

1985 animated series

UK DVD cover for Robotix: The Movie

Robotix is a 1985 American animated series based on the original Milton Bradley toyline of the same name featured on the Super Sunday programming block. The toyline is of the construction type that includes motors, wheels and pincers and similar to the Erector Set and K'Nex. The series follows the conflict between the peaceful Protectons and the warmongering Terrakors on the prehistoric alien world Skalorr V in the distant past and two groups of humans from the year 200X who get caught up in it.

The show was produced by Sunbow Productions and Marvel Productions and animated in Japan by Toei Animation, which also animated other cartoons featured on Super Sunday.

== Characters ==
=== Protectons ===
- Argus "Ark" Power Electronixus (voiced by Arthur Burghardt) is a leader of the Protectons. Before his transfer into his Robotix body, he was the chief-in-command of the Protectonian spacecraft city Zanadon and had a romantic relationship with Nara. He is compassionate and brave and tries to help the humans. He despises killing to the point that he would rather hurt himself than allow anybody to use him to kill another being. He almost suffered a nervous breakdown upon discovering that his mind and life force were downloaded into his robot shell. It is a monster/dragon/dog hybrid with a head on a long neck usable as a ramrod and a hook for a right hand that changes into a gun and crossed between a firetruck and an airliner. His transformations and features include a car-like form, a compact mode with shrunken arms and legs, laser cannons deploying from his chest and an additional K-series drone monster dog known as K-9. His pilot of choice is Exeter.
- Bront (voiced by Frank Welker) is a strongest tough-guy-like member of the Protectons. Before his transfer into his Robotix body, he maintained Zanadon's command center and initiated its battle mode. He is close friends with Jerrok, who often teased him in the past because of his meager size. Their trust was strained when Bront was wrongly accused of sabotaging Zanadon's reactor and almost attacked Kontor and Jerrok, but their partnership was soon re-established. His Robotix body is a monster/dragon hybrid with four wheels on walker legs extendable for river crossing that change into feet. His transformations and features include a car-like form with a deployable grabber, an extreme extension of his torso to form a ladder, a deployable twin-shell canister laser cannon on his forehead and hands that transform into smaller legs and combine into a drill, a two-man space control cockpit capsule, a cam-operated jaw, swivel joints and articulated elbows. His pilot of choice is Tauron.
- Jerrok (voiced by Neil Ross): Second-in-command of the Protectons and a friend of Bront, he helped him activate Zanadon's battle mode. He used to tease Bront as he was twice as tall as him, but after his transfer, he acquired the smallest Robotix body. It is crossed between a police motorcycle and a racing car. With that robot shell being the fastest and most maneuverable, he likes to play with his opponents while fighting them. His transformations and features include hands with built-in laser cannons and extreme extensions of his arms. His pilot of choice is Sphero.
- Nara (voiced by Susan Silo) is a female Robotix character in the series. Before being transferred into her Robotix body by Skalorr Penton Compu-Core "Electronix", who is the deity of the Protectons, she was his assistant and shared a romantic relationship with him. She is caring and wants to help humans as she understands how fragile they are compared to their robot shells. She is also very bright, being the first Protecton to see through Venturak's masquerade. Her Robotix body is a small dome-shaped monster/dragon hybrid torso with a face mounted on four powerful legs that are also usable as arms and crossed between an ambulance helicopter and a racing tank. Her body is significantly durable, and it can remain fully operational and mobile even when some of her legs are severely damaged or even removed. Her transformations and features include a hoverjet-like form, an ability to slide above ground, grabber cranes deployable from her legs and laser cannons deployable from her feet. Her pilot of choice is Steth.
- Venturak: When attacking the stasis chamber, Nemesis and Tyrannix manage to subdue Kontor, replacing his mind with that of Venturak, who serves as the Terrakor spy until he finally reveals his nature during the assault on Zanadon. His Robotix body was built by the Protectons from spare parts found in the Capsule Chamber and is a monster/dragon hybrid with shovel arms that double as walker legs and crossed between a police carrier and a saucer. He is the weakest Robotix, having no ranged weapons at least onscreen and never besting any Robotix in a fight without assistance. He appears not to have been given a Siliton crystal, instead, when he protests to Nemesis about it, he is flung unceremoniously to the ground, with Nemesis saying they will honor his melted remains throughout Terrakor history. His pilot of choice is Traxis.
- Boltar (voiced by Arthur Burghardt): Gentle beast of the Protectons, he is kind and supportive to his allies, but he can be a serious threat to his enemies. On one occasion, he was able to take out four Terrakors all on his own. He may be slightly mentally undeveloped, as he always speaks of himself in the third person and uses simple, short sentences (much like the Dinobots from The Transformers). His Robotix body is a bulky monster/dragon hybrid torso on six thin walker legs and crossed between an ambulance van and a racing jet and he can use its front ones as arms. It is the last robot shell created in the series and was assembled and animated by Zarru and Compu-Core during their stay in Zanadon, when they found an unfinished and part-lacking Robotix in one of the hangars. Apparently, the body that Boltar uses was still under construction when Skalorr's sun went supernova and was abandoned by its creators. His transformations and features include a humanoid combat mode, a helicopter mode and multiple onboard weapon systems, including laser cannons and flamethrowers. Boltar did not choose his pilot, as during his first battle he was piloted by Zarru, but Exeter later assigns Flexor as his partner, without any objection from the Protecton himself.
- Kontor (voiced by Michael Bell): Before the supernova cataclysm, Kontor was the main architect, designer, guardian and vice leader of the Protectons who Argus found trustworthy. He had a very short appearance, as he was ambushed by Nemesis and Tyranix in the Capsule Chamber just after he was transferred into Venturak's Robotix body and sent back into Compu-Core's essence bank to be replaced by Venturak himself. He never had any pilot or a chance to use any of his body features.
- Terragar is briefly seen when Nemesis captures Argus and attempts to delete his personality, replacing it with a Terrakor to deceive the Protectons. Once discovered, Terragar's mind is returned into Compu-Core.

=== Terrakors ===
- Nemesis (voiced by Peter Cullen) is a ruthless commander of the Terrakors who tries to take over Skalorr. In one of the flashbacks, he is seen trying to attack Zanadon with his army, but he then fails and swears death to deserters and vengeance to Argus. When it was discovered that the sun will go nova, he opted for manning the Terrastar and abandoning the dead planet, and even after transferring into his Robotix body he is willing to execute the plan. He has an obsession with obtaining Compu-Core and using it to control Terrastar, which he admires and treats with great care (as seen when Goon fails in salvaging the ship from a lake, being almost torn apart by a furious Nemesis). Unlike Argus, Nemesis sees his new body as a better chance to flee from the planet and conquer space, which helps him to use his robot shell more efficiently. He trusts only Tyrannix, even if he is not always willing to show it or even throw him away. His Robotix body is a blue monster/cobra hybrid and crossed between a bear and a military truck. His transformations and features included a left hand capable of extreme extension and shifting into a laser gun, buzz saw, super-sharp beam whips built into hands and small treads built into his feet for high speed rolling functions. His pilot of choice is Kanawk.
- Tyrannix (voiced by Frank Welker): A cold and calculating second-in-command of the Terrakors who was transferred into his Robotix body, he has the most firepower and is also their communications expert. He is mostly loyal to Nemesis, although he overthrows him when he tires of Nemesis' failed attempts to find the Terrastar. There is no record of him before his re-awakening as a Robotix specialized for communications and mid-range combat. He has highly sensitive sensor systems, which makes him able to detect targets approaching from miles away and even accurately telling who exactly the target is. His Robotix body is a skeletal monster/cobra hybrid with oversized wheels, wing-like radar solar panels, thruster pods on his legs and a twin-shell canister plasma engine on his left arm and crossed between an eagle and a military jet. As such, he sometimes walks on the ground and on other times prefers to hover and fly, as shown when he is running in the air when his leg pods are on. His arm engine also doubles as a flamethrower, laser cannon and connection thruster while in zero-gravity. He often singles out Nara in combat. His pilot of choice is Gaxon. As a fitting choice for Tyrannix, he is just merciless and cunning. He suggests stealing the last rations from Exeter's crew with considerable cruel delight and also later tries to force Argus to destroy a rock creature while briefly piloting him.
- Steggor is the most cunning and serpentine Terrakor of them all, and he has a rivalry with Bront. His Robotix body is a monster/cobra hybrid and crossed between a snake and a military car. His pilot of choice is Nomo. Steggor's relationship with him is the least cordial of all the Robotix.
- Goon (voiced by Corey Burton) is a dim-witted grunt Terrakor who possesses little intelligence. His Robotix body is a robust build that is crossed between a shark and a military tank and even used as the head of a battering ram for the Robotix to escape the rock creatures with. His pilot of choice is Loopis, who also does not get on too well with his Robotix.

=== Humans ===
- Exeter Galaxon (voiced by Pat Fraley): Textbook leader and father of Zarru, he is brave, compassionate, intelligent, resourceful and holds his own in the face of adversity, never more so in the climactic battle where in a spaceship devoid of oxygen he still is able to steer the Terrastar towards an asteroid for intended mutual destruction of friend and foe.
- Tauron Oxus (voiced by Corey Burton): Logical, wise and oldest crew member, it is he who states to his captain that it is in their interests to assist the Protectons in their battle.
- Kanawk Creant (voiced by Corey Burton) is a crew member who soon betrays them so he can join the Terrakors in attempting to leave the planet on their ship. Though he brokers the alliance with the Terrakors he often gets on Nemesis' bad side, almost being killed on their first meeting.
- Gaxon Gaves (voiced by Neil Ross) is a ruthless and quiet officer who joins to the Terrakors' side. He becomes a pilot to his Robotix Tyrannix and at one point Tyrannix blasts Argus, but the latter survives a conflict. He later tries to pilot Argus in their bid to escape and destroy the rock creatures, but Argus turns the gun on himself and ejects Gaxon as he only wants to escape, not to destroy.
- Loopis Cur (voiced by Michael Bell) is a sarcastic pilot and is a poor fit to give him command of the dimmest Robotix. He briefly walks out on his faction after nearly dying with Goon, when being used as a guinea pig to reactivate the Terrastar. Loopis even tries to escape when they set up, but Tyrannix stops him.
- Nomo Ares Yel (voiced by Pat Fraley) is pessimistic and often at odds with his Robotix. He is not quite as mean or willing to fight as his group, especially when they have the Protectons without interface. While not much brave, Nomo succeeds at one moment when he reprimands Steggor for harming Nara.
- Traxis Lyte Janussen (voiced by Michael Bell) is a self-serving double agent who switched from the Protectons to the Terrakors' side. It is likely that he openly turned down joining Kanawk, as he was unsure which side would be able to defeat the other, but he later accepts the latter side in secret. He is the only character in the show without an American accent.
- Steth Allo (voiced by Arthur Burghardt): A medical officer, he conducts tests that shows that Skalorr food is poisonous to humans, but is later revealed that applies only to their region. When Kanawk reveals his intention to leave the group and takes much of the group with him, Steth immediately says that he will divide the food, though Exeter responds to him by saying "These traitors can eat dirt for all I care".
- Flexor Tul (voiced by Neil Ross) is the one present when the Terrakors rob the food rations from the spaceship known as the USS Daniel Boone, which was formerly a submarine. He boldly tackles Tyrannix's hand with a saucepan and his legs are crushed by a refrigerator for his efforts, but without major damage as he is fully mobile for the duration of the show. He is probably afraid of big cats as he shows the most fear seeing the monstrous felid in the rock creature volcano.
- Sphero Sol (voiced by Peter Cullen): A burly crew member, he mistakenly convinces Flexor not to chase their ship moments before Tyrannix steals their food.
- Zarru Galaxon (voiced by Jason Naylor): Son of Exeter, he is, at times, a brash boy who gets into trouble. At one point he goes off on his own to prove himself, when Flexor is chosen to be Boltar's pilot. He briefly manages to take over a disgraced Goon, but Goon later overthrows him.

== Episode summaries ==
1. Battle of the Titans: After being pursued by an Ejoornian Zanque-class battlecruiser, a starship referred to as the USS Daniel Boone crash-lands on a desert of the ruined planet Skalorr and its occupants left for dead. The crew survives, but they soon find themselves caught up in a battle between two factions of gigantic robot monsters with reptilian essences created to rebuild the planet known as Robotix - the Protectons and the Terrakors - that emerge from the ground. While the Terrakors flee the scene, the Protectons befriend the captain Exeter and the crew and fix their ship. During the repair, Nara and Zarru discover that humans can interface with Robotix to enhance their abilities, while a renewed attack by the Terrakors forces Bront to put the new discovery to the test.
2. Paradise Lost: Interfaced with Exeter, Bront uses his new abilities to rescue Argus, who, interfaced with Tauron, helps him fend the Terrakors off. In the ensuing brief moment of peace, Argus takes the humans to the Protectons' underground base, where the history of Skalorr is related by Compu-Core, the planet's central intelligence. Three million years prior, the organic protosaurian races of the galactisaurian Protectons and the serpesaurian Terrakors were forced to set aside their hostilities when their sun began to nova. While Nemesis planned to use Compu-Core to launch his ship, the Terrastar, to transport a select few off the planet to safety, Compu-Core itself suggested the use of underground stasis tubes to preserve the entire population.
3. Traitor In Our Midst: The tale of Skalorr's history continues as the entire population of the planet seal themselves in stasis tubes, but a radiation leak threatens their lives and ruins their bodies beyond repair and Compu-Core is forced to transfer and store their essences within itself. When the radiation levels finally subside to normal several years later, she transfers the essences of four Protectons and four Terrakors into the Robotix. The ensuing battle led into the current events. As the repair of the Daniel Boone continues, Kanawk, Gaxon, Loopis and Nomo become impatiently dissatisfied with Exeter's leadership and are forced to set out on their own to find the Terrastar and offer their services to the Terrakors.
4. A Spy Is Born: Nemesis accepts Kanawk's offer, and the renegade humans and Terrakors interface. Shortly after the Protectons complete the construction of a new Robotix, infused with the essence of Kontor, the Terrakors stage a diversion to lure the Protectons out of their base. With the battle raging outside, Nemesis and Tyrannix penetrate the base and replace Kontor's essence with that of Venturak, who then interfaces with another turncoat human, Traxis, and is appointed as a spy within the Protecton ranks. He reveals to the Terrakors that the humans' food supply is dwindling, resulting in an attack on their ship and the theft of their remaining rations.
5. Crash Landing: The reconstruction of the Daniel Boone continues apace, and success is finally achieved, but the Terrakors attack the Protectons just as Exeter's crew blasts off. Helpless before the interfaced Terrakors, the Protectons face certain doom until Exeter's crew return to save them, only to discover that the Terrakors stole their guidance system when they took their food. The humans crash-land on the planet's desert again.
6. Firestorm at the Oasis: With their interfaces restored, the Protectons fend off the Terrakors, but Exeter's ship is now beyond repair, and the humans are still without food. Compu-Core releases probes to locate consumable vegetation, discovering an oasis that the humans and Protectons head for, while Argus and Venturak remain to guard Compu-Core. While the other Terrakors raze the oasis in an inferno, Nemesis invades the Protecton base with Venturak's help and captures Argus, erasing his essence.
7. Captured: The Protectons and humans at the oasis manage to survive by burrowing their way out, but Argus's failure to respond to his radio hailing prompts Bront to return to the base to investigate. Meanwhile, Nemesis infuses Argus's body with the essence of Terragar, and they escape with Compu-Core. Bront pursues them, but is almost tricked by Terragar, posing as Argus, with the deception only being revealed by Loopis' presence at the controls. Bront seizes Compu-Core and flees into the crystalline Desert of Illusions, but, one by one, the illusions are dispelled, leaving Bront staring down Terragar's cannon barrel.
8. The Lost Cities: Nara and Jerrok come to Bront's aid, and the Terrakors flee, leaving Terragar's deactivated body behind. Compu-Core is able to restore Argus using a back-up copy of his essence, and the Protectons begin to search for their old city, Zanadon. At the same time, however, the Terrakors search for their own city, Terrakordia, and send Steggor to pursue the Protectons. The Terrakors then discover that it has been crushed by a glacier, and that the Terrastar is nowhere to be found. Enraged, Tyrannix turns on Nemesis and claims leadership of the Terrakors for himself, heading off with Goon to join Steggor. Meanwhile, the Protectons seek to reactivate Zanadon, turning to Kontor, as he was responsible for creating the city. As his essence was replaced within the Robotix by Venturak, he sabotages the turbo flow generator and pins the blame on Bront when the generator threatens to explode and destroy the entire city.
9. Bront Stands Accused: The Protectons only just manage to escape Zanadon as Compu-Core seals the city's dome to contain the explosion to only one of its multiple sectors. The situation is made worse by Venturak, who implicates Bront as a traitor, forcing the other Protectons to imprison him until his innocence can be proved. In the ensuing confusion, Tyrannix and Goon attempt to once again steal Compu-Core, but Venturak fights back, fearing Nemesis' wrath. Nemesis and Steggor then re-enter the fray, and Zarru frees Bront, who convinces the other Protectons he is not a traitor by helping them claim victory in the battle. Exploring inside Zanadon, Zarru discovers an incomplete Robotix body that requires additional parts. Venturak directs the Protectons to a nearby factory that contains the parts they need, but unbeknownst to them, the Terrakors have already set up an ambush there.
10. The Factory of Death: The Protectons struggle against the factory's various machines, while Zarru and Flexor put together the unfinished Robotix as best they can. A distress call from Argus forces them to activate the new Robotix, infusing it with the essence of Boltar, who stomps to the aid of the captive Protectons and rescues them. Exeter, however, refuses to leave Zarru in order to be Boltar's pilot, and, instead, appoints Flexor, and in an effort to prove to Exeter that he is skilled enough, Zarru sets out to locate the Terrakors.
11. Zarru Takes the Plunge: Zarru crash lands somewhere in the icy tundra region of Skalorr, where the Terrakors have successfully located the Terrastar submerged in a lake. As they attempt to reactivate the ship, the Protectons — running low on energy — set out searching for Zarru. Goon is given the unenviable job of launching the Terrastar, and quickly loses control of the ship, burying it in an avalanche. While moving quickly, Zarru invades Goon's control capsule, but he is then thrown from it and rescued by the Protectons. The Terrakors are forced to flee due to their own depleting energy levels, and both factions head for Siliton Mountain to locate the crystals they need to recharge. The Terrakors have a head start, and stage a flash flood to wash the Protectons away.
12. Attack of the Rock Creatures: Boltar's bulk shields the Protectons from the flood, and they continue on their search for the crystals. Both races are captured by a bizarre race of rock creatures, who also feed on the crystals. The creatures separate the humans from their Robotix partners and imprison them in their subterranean realm within a volcano. As the humans watch, they see the rock creatures smelt their ship (it is unexplained how the ship that was back at the Protectons ended up being where everyone was being held hostage), and it soon becomes apparent that the Robotix are to share the same fate, with Jerrok going first.
13. All for One: Held captive in a pit by the rock creatures, the humans are threatened by a monstrous many eyed feline, which Exeter uses to escape. After snatching a Siliton crystal, he recharges Jerrok, who saves himself and holds off the rock creatures while the humans recharge the other Robotix and interface with the nearest ones they can find. This leads to some unstable partnerships, as Argus ejects Gaxon from his control capsule for forcing him to kill the rock creatures. Goon and Bront fuse into a battering ram that smashes open a path to freedom, but when Tyrannix opens fire on the rock creatures, he triggers the volcano, forcing all the Robotix and humans to partner up correctly to most efficiently save both themselves and the rock creatures from destruction. The rock creatures lead the Protectons to safety, but the Terrakors manage to survive on their own, and once again attack Zanadon, as Tyrannix buries the city in a rockslide.
14. Battle for Zanadon: After brief concern from the Terrakors that the rockslide may have destroyed Compu-Core, Zanadon becomes airborne, and the Protectons try to move it out of reach. While Venturak and Compu-Core monitor city functions, the other Protectons explore various regions of the city, but when Argus is attacked by Nemesis, he realises that Kontor has opened the city's dome to allow the Terrakors access. Tyrannix and Bront battle in the city's sporting stadium, while Steggor pursues Nara into the medical bay. Defeating Steggor, Nara discovers Venturak, the charade over, preparing to abscond with Compu-Core. No match for both Venturak and Tyrannix, Nara is defeated, and Nemesis and the Terrakors escape, with Compu-Core in their clutches. As the Protectons struggle to even close the city's domes without Compu-Core, the now-airborne Terrastar soars overhead, and begins its attack.
15. The Final Attack: The Terrastar razes Zanadon, but in the ensuing conflagration, the Protectons attempt to penetrate the Terrastar's hull. Nemesis directs the ship into space, into a nearby asteroid belt, knocking all but Argus and Nara off into the void. They smash their way into the ship, and Nara is quickly knocked off into space by Tyrannix, leaving Argus and Exeter alone to face the assembled Terrakors. Struggling against the airless vacuum, Exeter directs the Terrastar toward a giant asteroid, then grapples with Kanawk, as Argus overcomes the Terrakors and comes to his aid by hurling Kanawk aside into the wall (even though any apparent deaths of a human are not shown onscreen) and escaping from the ship with Exeter and Compu-Core as it crashes into the asteroid, exploding in a giant fireball. Floating in space, Argus is picked up by the other Protectons, who have survived by combining. They return to the surface of Skalorr, and begin plans to rebuild their world, with help from the humans, who all agree to stay and help their new allies. In the void of space, Nemesis still lives, along with Kanawk.

== Robotix: The Movie ==
Robotix: The Movie
- Directed by: John Gibbs; Terry Lennon
- Written by: Alan Swayze
- Produced by: Joe Bacal; Tom Griffin; Don Jurwich
- Starring: Michael Bell; Arthur Burghardt; Corey Burton; Victor Caroli; Peter Cullen; Pat Fraley; Jason Naylor; Neil Ross; Susan Silo; Frank Welker
- Narrated by: Victor Caroli
- Music by: Robert J. Walsh
- Production companies: Hasbro; Sunbow Productions; Marvel Productions; Toei Animation
- Distributed by: Claster Television
- Release date: 1987
- Running time: 90 minutes
- Country: United States
- Language: English

In 1987, the fifteen six-minute long shorts were compiled together and released on video as Robotix: The Movie, a 90-minute feature film on VHS. The film was re-released on DVD for Region 2 in the UK and Ireland in 2003.

== Comic book ==
Marvel Comics produced a single-issue comic book written and drawn by Herb Trimpe in February 1986, which roughly followed the storyline of the first three episodes of the series. A commercial for the comic was made and aired on Saturday mornings.
