= Cybernetics (disambiguation) =

Cybernetics is a transdisciplinary approach for exploring regulatory systems, their structures, constraints, and possibilities, but has other definitions.

Cybernetics may also refer to:

- Cybernetics: Or Control and Communication in the Animal and the Machine, a 1948 book by Norbert Wiener
- Cybernetics and Human Knowing, a quarterly peer-reviewed academic journal
- Cybernetics and Systems, formerly Journal of Cybernetics, a peer-reviewed scientific journal
- Cybernetics Society, a British society for the promotion of cybernetics

== See also ==
- Second-order cybernetics, the cybernetics of cybernetics
- Cyberneticist
- Cyber (disambiguation)
