= Drone =

Drone or The Drones may refer to:

== Science and technology ==
=== Vehicle ===
- Drone, a type of uncrewed vehicle, a class of robot
  - Unmanned aerial vehicle or aerial drone
    - Unmanned combat aerial vehicle
      - Suicide drone (disambiguation)
    - Drone racing
    - Drones in wildfire management
  - Unmanned ground vehicle or ground drone
  - Unmanned surface vehicle or drone boats, drone ships, drones, vessel, surface drone, robot ship, robot boat
  - Unmanned underwater vehicle or underwater drone, drone sub, robot sub
    - Remotely operated underwater vehicle

Any of the above types may be used in Drone warfare.

=== Biology ===
- Drone (bee), a male bee
- Drone, fertile male ant

== Arts and entertainment ==
=== Film ===
- Drones (2010 film), an American office comedy
- Drones (2013 film), an American war thriller
- Drone (2014 film), a Norwegian documentary
- Drone (2017 film), a Canadian thriller
- The Drone, a 2019 American comedy horror
- Drones (2026 film), an Indian science fantasy

=== Television ===
- "Drones" (Beavis and Butt-Head), 2011 episode
- "Drone" (Star Trek: Voyager), 1998 episode

=== Music ===
==== Instruments ====
- Drone (bagpipes)
- Shruti box or drone box, originating from the Indian subcontinent
- Drone zither
- Bladder fiddle or drone

==== Artists ====
- The Drones (Australian band)
- The Drones (English band)

==== Albums ====
- Drones (album), 2015 album by Muse
- Drones, 1983 album by Robert Rich
- The Drones, 2001 EP by the Australian band Drones

==== Songs ====
- "Drone", 2018, by Alice in Chains from Rainier Fog
- "Drone", 2015, by Chastity Belt from Time to Go Home
- "Drones", 2004, by Fear Factory from Archetype
- "Drones", 2020, by Grandson from I Love You, I'm Trying
- "Drones", 2015, by Muse, the title track from the eponymous album Drones
- "Drones", 2015, by Oh Hiroshima from In Silence We Yearn
- "Drones", 2006, by Rise Against from The Sufferer & the Witness
- "Drone Warfare" (song)

==== Other uses in music ====
- Drone (sound), a continuous note or chord
- Drones World Tour, 2015, by Muse; supporting the eponymous 2015 album
- Drone metal, a musical style
- Drone music, a musical style

=== Fictional characters ===
- Drone, a member of the Drones Club in P. G. Wodehouse's novels
- Drones, intelligent machines in the utopian society The Culture of Iain M. Banks
- Drone, a humanoid assimilated by the Borg in Star Trek
- Drones, service robots in Silent Running (1972)
- Drones or yanme'e, fictional species in the Covenant in Halo

== People ==
- Drone (wrestler) (Hombre Bala Jr., born 1991), ringname of a Mexican professional luchador
- Kyron Drones (born 2003), American football player
- Luke Drone (born 1984), U.S. American football player

== Places ==
- Drone, Georgia, an unincorporated community in the US
- Dronne, also spelled Drône, a river in south-western France
- Pointe de Drône, a mountain in the Pennine Alps, Italy-Switzerland
- River Drone, Sheffield, South Yorkshire, England, UK

== Other uses ==
- Video game bot

== See also ==
- Didgeridoo, sometimes called a dronepipe
- Droners
- Droned (disambiguation)
- Dronne (disambiguation)
- Robot (disambiguation)
