= Zyber =

Zyber is an Albanian masculine given name. Notable people with the name include:

- Zyber Hallulli (1842–1927), Albanian mufti and politician
- Zyber Konçi (1927–2015), Albanian football manager
- Zyber Lisi (born 1919), Albanian football player

== See also ==
- Haxhi Qamili, born Qamil Zyber Xhameta (1876–1915), Albanian rebel, a leader of two pro-Ottoman revolts
