= Paranoid Android (disambiguation) =

"Paranoid Android" is a 1997 song by Radiohead.

Paranoid Android may also refer to:

- Marvin the Paranoid Android, a character from The Hitchhiker's Guide to the Galaxy and the source of the song's name
- "Paranoid Android" (Legends of Tomorrow), an episode of Legends of Tomorrow
- "Paranoid Android" (Holby City), an episode of Holby City
- "Paranoid Android", an episode of Unforgettable season 4
- Paranoid Android (operating system), custom Android firmware

== See also ==
- "Paranoid Frandroid", an episode of American Dad! season 15
