= Android =

Android most commonly refers to:

- Android (robot), a humanoid robot or synthetic organism designed to imitate a human
- Android (operating system), primarily developed by Google
  - Googlebook OS, a desktop operating system by Google for Android PCs
  - The Android mascot, the mascot of the Android operating system
  - Android TV, a operating system developed by Google for Smart TVs

Android may also refer to:

== Arts and entertainment ==
=== Film ===
- Android (film), 1982, directed by Aaron Lipstadt
- Android, the Russian title for the 2013 film App

=== Music ===
- The Androids, an Australian rock band
- "Android" (song), 2012, by TVXQ
- "Android", a song by Green Day from the album Kerplunk
- "Android", a song on The Prodigy's What Evil Lurks EP

=== Other uses in arts and entertainment ===
- Android (board game), published by Fantasy Flight Games
- Amazo, DC Comics character aka The Android
- The Android (novel), by K. A. Applegate
- Android 18, Dragon Ball manga character
- Android 17 (Dragon Ball), manga character, brother of Android 18
- Android 15, yet another distinguished Dragon Ball: Super Android 13 movie character

== See also ==
- Androyd, a brand name of oxymetholone
- Gynoid
- Cyborg
- Robot
- Droid (disambiguation)
- Metalman (disambiguation)
- Paranoid Android (disambiguation)
- Robotman (disambiguation)
