= Dordogne (disambiguation) =

Dordogne is a French département.

Dordogne may also refer to:

- Dordogne (river), a river in France
- SS Dordogne, a tanker ship built in 1914 and scuttled in 1940
- Dordogne (video game), a 2023 adventure game
- Grappu De La Dordogne (Dordogne grape, Dordogne vine)
- Duke Aymon, also known as Duke of Dordogne, a character from the medieval Matter of France

== See also ==
- Canton of Vallée Dordogne (Dordogne Valley canton), Dordogne, Nouvelle-Aquitaine, France
- Canton of Haute-Dordogne (Upper Dordogne canton), Corrèze, Nouvelle-Aquitaine, France
