= Cyborg (play-by-mail game) =

Science fiction play-by-mail game

Cyborg is a play-by-mail game that was published by Integral Games beginning in 1981.

== Gameplay ==
Cyborg was a game in which players control computer complexes two hundred years after a devastating war.

== Reception ==
W.G. Armintrout reviewed Cyborg in The Space Gamer No. 49. Armintrout commented that "I recommend Cyborg as a good game with these provisions: (1) be prepared to spend some time keeping track of what you own and what you know, and (2) expect an error occasionally."
