= Cyberchase =

Animated educational children's TV series

- Genre: Science fantasy Educational
- Created by: Sandra Sheppard
- Directed by: Yvette Kaplan ("The Poddleville Case"); Larry Jacobs (seasons 1–4); Jason Groh (season 5); Brandon Lloyd (seasons 6–8); J. Meeka Stuart (seasons 9–13); Sarah Anne Davis (seasons 14–)
- Starring: Bianca DeGroat; Matthew A. Wilson; Jaden Michael; Courtney Chu; Violet Tinnirello; Carter Jones; Charlotte MacLeod
- Voices of: Christopher Lloyd; Gilbert Gottfried; Ron Pardo; Novie Edwards; Jacqueline Pillon; Annick Obonsawin; Len Carlson; Philip Williams; Peter Cugno; Robert Tinkler; Richard Binsley; Linda Ballantyne
- Theme music composer: George Guerrette; Julian Harris
- Opening theme: "Cyberchase Theme" performed by Karen LeBlanc
- Ending theme: "Cyberchase Theme" (instrumental)
- Composers: Peter Lurye ("The Poddleville Case"); David W. Shaw; Steve Pecile (season 1); Craig Marshall (seasons 5–7); Edmund Eagan (seasons 8–); Julian Harris (several "For Real" segments)
- Countries of origin: United States; Canada
- Original language: English
- No. of seasons: 16
- No. of episodes: 153 (list of episodes)

Production
- Executive producers: Sandra Sheppard; Kristin Laskas Martin (seasons 1–4); Michael Hirsh (seasons 1–2); Patrick Loubert (season 1); Clive A. Smith (season 1); Toper Taylor (seasons 1–2); Scott Dyer (seasons 2–5); Doug Murphy (seasons 3–5); Paul Robertson (season 3)
- Running time: 23 minutes (episodes, excluding "For Real" segments); 2-3¼ minutes ("For Real" segments)
- Production companies: Thirteen/WNET New York; Nelvana (Note: Credited as Nelvana International Limited.) (seasons 1–5); Flying Minds Entertainment (season 4); PiP Animation Services (seasons 6–); Title Entertainment (seasons 6–9)

Original release
- Network: PBS Kids (Note: Aired as part of PBS Kids Go! from 2004 to 2013.)
- Release: January 21, 2002 – present

Cyberchase is an animated science fantasy children's television series that airs on PBS Kids. The series centers around three children from Earth: Jackie, Matt and Inez, who are brought into Cyberspace, a digital universe, in order to protect it from the villainous Hacker (Christopher Lloyd). They are able to foil Hacker's schemes by means of problem-solving skills in conjunction with basic mathematics, environmental science and wellness. In Cyberspace, they meet Digit (Gilbert Gottfried for the first thirteen seasons, later Ron Pardo as of the fourteenth), a "cybird" who helps them on their missions.

Cyberchase was created by Sandra Sheppard, developed for children ages 8 to 11, and premiered on PBS Kids on January 21, 2002. In 2010, after season 8, Cyberchase went on hiatus, but it returned in 2013 for a ninth season, focusing more on environmental science.

== Plot ==
Motherboard is the "brain of the giant computer system that oversees all of Cyberspace". Her technician computer scientist, Doctor Marbles, kept her functioning properly until his assistant, The Hacker, turned against them. Marbles drained Hacker's battery and banished him to the Northern Frontier, where he formulated a plan to launch a computer virus that would attack Motherboard.

When Jackie, Matt and Inez interact with a library map in the real world, they accidentally allow Hacker access to Motherboard and she becomes infected with the virus. The kids are brought into Cyberspace and join forces with Digit, a creation of the Hacker who escaped his control. Together they protect the world from the Hacker and his clumsy, accident-prone assistants, Buzz and Delete, until they can recover the Encryptor Chip, a device stolen by Hacker that can nullify the virus and bring Motherboard back to full strength.

Cyberspace consists of planet-like bodies called Cybersites, with each site having a theme such as Ancient Egypt, the American frontier, Greek mythology and amusement parks. These sites represent the diversity of websites on the Internet and reflect the many ecosystems and neighborhoods of Earth. The Cybersquad travels to many of these locations in order to protect them from Hacker and each inhabited Cybersite has a unique type of Cybercitizen they interact with.

== Characters ==
=== CyberSquad ===
- Jackie (voiced by Novie Edwards) is a Jamaican-American girl who loves to keep things neat and organized in order to figure things out. Jackie's biggest pet peeve is slimy and icky stuff like bugs and many other "gross" things. Like Inez, she was very fond of Slider. In a running gag in Seasons 1 & 4, Jackie freaked out when in crisis, pacing for 2 or 5 seconds while trying to figure out a solution, saying "Make room, I gotta pace!"
- Matt (voiced by Jacqueline Pillon) is an Irish-American boy who likes skateboards and collecting things. He is impulsive, impatient, tells jokes and has a great interest in sports. He has a pig named Sherman on his family's farm. Matt's backpack contains his many yo-yos, which he is very good at using and often plays with one whenever he is thinking hard about something. He frequently calls Inez by the nickname "Nezzie", much to her annoyance. It is also shown he can be quite protective of her at times.
- Inez (voiced by Annick Obonsawin) is a Hispanic American girl who has an excellent vocabulary for which the others often tease her. Despite being the youngest human member of the gang, she is the smartest one. Whenever she is thinking up a solution, Inez has a habit of doing headstands to help her concentrate.
- Digit, nicknamed Didge by various people and Didgey by Delete (voiced by Gilbert Gottfried in seasons 1–13 and Ron Pardo in seasons 14–present), is a "cybird" (portmanteau of "cyborg" and bird), who works for Motherboard and is the kids' best friend. He and the kids protect Cyberspace and Motherboard from Hacker. Digit was originally created by Hacker and worked for him along with Buzz and Delete, but escaped after learning of Hacker's true intentions. He became one of Motherboard's helpers, serving as Dr. Marbles' assistant. Digit can fly by spinning his tail feathers in a helicopter-fashion or flapping his wings. However, he has a fear of heights and prefers to walk. He is a cook and wrote his popular cookbooks The Cyber Chef and Cookin' with the Didge. He carries many objects in his chest, including his miniature doppelgänger, Widget. He can turn his beak into just about anything and bends it on occasion. He also can disguise his voice very well.

=== Villains ===
- Hacker, also known as The Hacker (voiced by Christopher Lloyd), is a self-centered mad scientist bent on conquering or creating ultimate chaos for Cyberspace, but he is almost always thwarted by the CyberSquad. Hacker was originally created by Doctor Marbles to assist Motherboard, but he rebelled and was exiled to Northern Frontier. Nevertheless, he does have the potential to become good again, as shown in a pair of episodes where he became a peaceful artist and when he helped the CyberSquad protect the trees in the Northern Frontier. He has a pair of cyborg lackeys, Buzz and Delete, whose reliability is quite variable; sometimes, he gets very peeved when he has to do things himself as Buzz and Delete cannot.
- Buzz, nicknamed "Buzzy" (voiced by Len Carlson in seasons 1–5, Philip Williams in seasons 6–15, and Peter Cugno in season 16 onward), is one of Hacker's henchmen. Buzz is a small spherical cyborg with a large mouth and scrawny limbs. Buzz seems to think he is a big tough guy; however, he can be kind at times and loves doughnuts. In later seasons, he and Delete have been on friendlier terms with the CyberSquad, occasionally joining their team to solve problems.
- Delete, nicknamed "DeeDee" (voiced by Robert Tinkler), is one of Hacker's henchmen. Delete is skinnier and taller than Buzz. Delete is loyal to Hacker for the most part but has occasionally helped the CyberSquad. Unlike Buzz, who is rougher around the edges, Delete is softer and more vulnerable to trickery and deceit. He cares deeply for three things; Buzz, whom he has a brotherly friendship with, his desired pet bunny George, and Zanko, his fairy borg father. In later seasons, he and Buzz have been on friendlier terms with the CyberSquad, occasionally joining their team to solve problems.

=== "Cyberchase for Real" ===
- Bianca DeGroat (played by herself) is a character in the "For Real" segment of the series. She often uses the original plot to solve everyday real world problems. As a character, she is rather absent-minded, arrogant, self-centered and does not think before she acts. She is seen to get carried away very easily.
- Harry Wilson (played by Matthew A. Wilson) is a character in the "For Real" segment. He often dresses in a nerdish style and wears horn-rimmed glasses and Converse shoes. In many of the segments, he is easily determined and free spirited yet rather careless, which usually costs him his current job. He is also very creative and thought out when he encounters a problem.
- Jaden Michael (played by himself)
- Courtney Chu (played by herself)
- Alex (played by Violet Tinnirello)
- Booker Jones (played by Carter Jones)
- Kimmie (played by Charlotte MacLeod)

=== Team Motherboard ===
- Motherboard (voiced by Kristina Nicoll) is the benevolent ruler of Cyberspace and mentor to the CyberSquad. She was weakened by a virus sent by Hacker, which was partially blocked by her firewall. The CyberSquad tries to recover the Encryptor Chip and keep Motherboard safe from Hacker.
- Dr. Marbles (voiced by Richard Binsley) is a smart and brilliant mechanic who serves Motherboard. He previously created Hacker to help and defend Motherboard, although Hacker would later rebel against Motherboard and try to destroy her. A guilty Marbles downgraded Hacker's power and banished him to the Northern Frontier for his misdeeds, right after Hacker vowed to return to finish Motherboard and Marbles off before conquering Cyberspace.
- Widget (voiced by Gilbert Gottfried) is a miniature doppelgänger of Digit who is stored in his chest. His hat, tail feathers and bow tie are not screwed on properly.
- Teeny Weeny "TW" Parallini (voiced by Isabel de Carteret) is a young parallelogram who is not scared of Hacker. Despite her mother forbidding her from helping the CyberSquad, she helps them find her uncle Diamond Joe.
- Fluff (voiced by Austin Dilulio) is a penguin who plays ice hockey. He is logical and does not buy into advertisements. Fluff is determined to follow in his father's footsteps and make his family proud.
- Creech (voiced by Sugar Lyn Beard) is the young ruler of the Cybersite, Tikiville. She became the apparent Big Kahuna after competing in a race with other Tikiville-inhabitants as well as Hacker. Creech is in some ways similar to Inez, helping the two to become friends easily. Both have a fairly similar outlook: optimistic until something goes completely wrong and they both have a large vocabulary. She also is the person in charge of Tikiville's Egg of Benedicta.
- Jules (voiced by Miklos Perlus) was first seen as a cave guard in the episode, "Crystal Clear" and is a good friend of the Cybersquad, but is often timid. He appears again in the episode "Jimaya Jam", where Hacker tricks him into pressing the nose of the Jam Master, causing Matt, Jackie, Creech and himself to get sucked into the chamber of Jimaya. He is often trying to find a job, but Hacker continuously tries to ruin it for him.
- Slider (voiced by Tim Hamaguchi) is a serious and James Dean-style 13-year-old skateboarder in Radopolis who builds and repairs skateboards and bikes. Since season 3, he has been a recurring character in the series. According to Slider, his father Coop had abandoned him when he was younger because Hacker had hunted Coop for many years. In the episode "Measure for Measure", he learns that his father abandoned him to protect him and to make sure Hacker does not get an interface card that would allow Hacker to transform into whatever he wishes. If such were to happen, Hacker could cause immense chaos and even rule Cyberspace.

== Episodes ==
Season	Episodes	Originally released	
Season	Episodes	First released	Last released
1	26	January 21, 2002	August 7, 2002
2	14	February 14, 2003	October 28, 2003
3	12	May 3, 2004	December 31, 2004
4	10	April 15, 2005	October 7, 2005
5	10	October 31, 2006	September 3, 2007
6	10	November 7, 2007	October 27, 2008
7	7	April 20, 2009	October 6, 2009
8	5	June 25, 2010	July 23, 2010
9	5	November 4, 2013	April 15, 2014
10	5	November 9, 2015	November 13, 2015
11	10	October 23, 2017	April 20, 2018
12	12	April 19, 2019	May 8, 2020
13	10	February 25, 2022	May 20, 2022
14	4	April 21, 2023	May 11, 2023
15	8	April 27, 2024	May 25, 2024
16	7	April 18, 2026	TBA

=== Cyberchase For Real ===
Each Cyberchase episode is followed by "Cyberchase For Real", a live-action educational supplement linking concepts learned in the show to real life experiences. The actors Bianca DeGroat and Matthew A. Wilson (known as Harry Wilson on the show) are in their 30s, but amusingly act in a manner similar to the age of the target audience. "For Real" is produced by WNET in and around New York City after production is completed on the animated segments. These "For Real" segments are broadcast exclusively on PBS in the United States where the program runs longer and fills the time gap where there might be breaks for "commercials". Some "For Real" segments can also be viewed online. In 2012, "Oh Noah", shorts that teach kids to speak Spanish, aired in place of the "For Real" segments on select episodes. Beginning with Season 11, DeGroat and Wilson were joined by Courtney Chu, who plays Harry's niece, and Jaden Michael, who plays Bianca's nephew. In later seasons, they assume the role of host for the live-action segments, along with other children, including Violet Tinnirello as Alex.

== Development ==
=== Conception ===
Cyberchase was conceived in 1999 as an educational show that aims to show kids that math is everywhere and everyone can be good at it. The series encourages viewers to see, think, and do mathematics in their world. The show and supporting activities have been designed to support math education and reflect the curriculum standards of the National Council of Teachers of Mathematics. The show's philosophy is to foster enthusiasm for math, to model mathematic reasoning, to help children improve their problem-solving skills and to inspire all children to approach math with confidence and a "can-do" attitude.

Later seasons place less emphasis on mathematics and more on science-related content. Science education concepts covered on the show include environmentalism, wellness, habitat fragmentation, marine ecology, and indoor air quality.

=== Production and broadcast ===
Originally, Thirteen produced the show in partnership with Ontario-based Nelvana Limited for PBS Kids. It aired on PBS Kids since 2002, and aired part of PBS Kids Go! from 2004 to 2013, and on V-me (dubbed in Spanish). Cyberchase has been animated by PiP Animation Services Inc. since season six; Right Path Pictures did post-production, and Curious Pictures did the original character design.

Twelfth Root Music produces the sound track for Cyberchase.

Thirteen/WNET New York and Nelvana Limited produced the first five seasons, while Thirteen, in association with Title Entertainment and WNET.ORG, produced seasons six to nine. Since the tenth season, Thirteen has solely handled production to the present day.

=== Brand extension ===
There are two apps that Cyberchase has released to date:

1. Cyberchase 3D Builder
2. Cyberchase Shape Quest

== Reception ==
=== Critical response ===
On the site Common Sense Media, the show was rated four out of five stars. The reviewer, Joly Herman, commented that "the adventures aren't scary, violent, or sexually inappropriate" but "require fortitude and brain power". Proposed discussion points sprouting from the series include "Can your child take the skills learned in each episode and figure out how to apply it to everyday life?" Herman noted that the only downside was that the adventures did not take place in the "real world" but added that the "For Real" segments solved this problem.

Carey Bryson of About.com gave the show a rating of four out of five stars. Bryson noted that the series' explanations of "simple mathematical idea[s]" are "usually explained well and woven throughout the story in a fun and interesting way". The review commended the series for its accessibility: "Children can easily learn from the example in the cartoon story" and praised the "Cyberchase For Real segment that follows each episode". Citing an example from the series using codes, Bryson explained how the show could be used to expand upon the curriculum: "Not only did [her five-year-old] learn about codes, but she also got in a ton of spelling practice". Bryson commended the series: "Educationally, Cyberchase delivers".

=== Awards ===
Cyberchase has been nominated for five Daytime Emmys and won in 2007 in the Outstanding Broadband Program category. Cyberchase also won a CINE Golden Eagle in 2006.

Year	Category	Recipient(s)	Result
2003	Parent's Choice Award for Spring 2003 Television	Cyberchase	Silver Honor
2006	Parent's Choice Award for Spring 2006 Website	Cyberchase	Approved
2007	Outstanding Broadband Program – Children's	^{See below}	Won
2008	Outstanding New Approaches – Children's	^{See below}	Nominated
2008	Outstanding Performer in an Animated Program	Christopher Lloyd	Nominated
2009	Outstanding New Approaches – Daytime Children's	^{See below}	Nominated
2009	Parent's Choice Award for Spring 2009 Television	Cyberchase	Recommended
2010	Parent's Choice Award for Spring 2010 Television	Cyberchase	Recommended
2010	Parent's Choice Award for Fall 2010 Website	Cyberchase	Silver Honor
2012	Outstanding New Approaches – Daytime Children's	^{See below}	Nominated
2014	Parent's Choice Award for Spring 2014 Television	Cyberchase	Silver Honor
2014	Parent's Choice Award for Spring 2014 Television	Cyberchase For Real	Silver Honor
2016	Parent's Choice Award for Spring 2016 Television	Cyberchase	Silver Honor
2016	Parent's Choice Award for Spring 2016 Mobile Apps	Cyberchase Shape Quest	Recommended

^2007 Outstanding Broadband Program nominees: Frances Nankin, Sandra Sheppard, Ellen Doherty, Jill Peters, Bob Morris, Suzanne Rose, Michelle Chen, Elizabeth Hummer, Arash Hoda, Anthony Chapman, David Hirmes, Bianca DeGroat, Matthew A. Wilson, George Arthur Bloom
^2008 Outstanding New Approaches nominees: Sandra Sheppard, Frances Nankin, Ellen Doherty, Jill Peters, David Hirmes, Kelly Lafferty, Michelle Chen, Tanner Vea, Bob Morris, Matthew A. Wilson
^2009 Outstanding New Approaches nominees: Sandra Sheppard, Frances Nankin, Ellen Doherty, David Hirmes, Tanner Vea, Denyse Ouellette, Gilbert Gottfried, Phil Williams, Robert Tinkler
^2012 Outstanding New Approaches nominees: Frances Nankin, Sandra Sheppard, Jill Peters, Marj Kleinman, Ellen Doherty, Kristin DiQuollo, Michelle Chen

== See also ==
- Cyberspace, the technological concept
