= I, Robot (disambiguation) =

I, Robot is a 1950 science fiction fixup novel by Isaac Asimov.

I, Robot, I Robot, or iRobot may also refer to:

== Literature ==
- "I, Robot" (short story), a 1939 science-fiction short story by Eando Binder
- "I, Robot" (Cory Doctorow), a 2005 science-fiction short story by Cory Doctorow

== Television and film ==
- "I, Robot" (1964 The Outer Limits), a television episode based on the Binder story
- "I, Robot" (1995 The Outer Limits), a television episode based on the Binder story
- I, Robot (film), a 2004 film starring Will Smith, loosely based on the Asimov novel

== Other uses ==
- I Robot (album) or title song, by the Alan Parsons Project, 1977
- I, Robot (video game), a 1984 arcade game
- iRobot, an American robot manufacturer
- IRO-bot, a type of fictional robot in the Amory Wars comics and novels
