= Metalman =

Metalman, metal man, or, variant, may refer to:

== Fictional characters ==
- Metal Man, videogame boss from Mega Man 2
- MetalMan, videogame character from Rockman EXE 4.5 Real Operation
- Metalman, comic book character from Irredeemable
- Metal Men, comic book characters published by DC Comics

== Music ==
- Metalman, a line of bass guitars from Dean Guitars
  - Dean Metalman ML
  - Dean Metalman Z
- "MetalMan", 2008 song by The Megas
- "Metal Man", song concerning Marvin the Paranoid Android of A Hitch Hiker's Guide to the Galaxy

== Other uses ==
- Metalman Brewing, a craft brewery from Ireland, see Beer in Ireland
- "Metalman", a 2008 television episode, see list of Oggy and the Cockroaches episodes
- Metal music person
- Metal Man (beacon), a beacon off the coast of the Rosses Point Peninsula in County Sligo, Ireland

== See also ==
- Robot
- Android (robot)
- Mannequin
- Statue
