= Dirty Pair (TV series) =

1985 science fiction anime television series

- Promotional Nippon Television poster featuring the two protagonists, Kei (left) and Yuri (right)
- ダーティペア
- Based on: Dirty Pair by Haruka Takachiho
- Developed by: Hiroyuki Hoshiyama
- Directed by: Toshifumi Takizawa (Note: Credited as chief director for episodes 15–26.); Norio Kashima (#15–26)
- Music by: Toshiyuki Kimori
- Opening theme: "Ru-Ru-Ru-Russian Roulette" by Meiko Nakahara
- Ending theme: "Space Fantasy" by Meiko Nakahara
- Country of origin: Japan
- Original language: Japanese
- No. of episodes: 26 (list of episodes)

Production
- Producers: Norio Hatsukawa; Takayuki Yoshii
- Production company: Nippon Sunrise

Original release
- Network: NTV
- Release: July 15 – December 26, 1985

Related
Further information
Original video animation
Dirty Pair: Affair of Nolandia
Directed by	Masaharu Okuwaki
Written by	Kazunori Itō
Music by	Yoshihiro Kunimoto
Studio	Nippon Sunrise
Licensed by	Crunchyroll (Note: In North America, through Nozomi Entertainment.)
Released	December 20, 1985
Runtime	60 minutes
Original video animation
Dirty Pair 2
Directed by	Katsuyoshi Yatabe
Written by	Hiroyuki Hoshiyama
Music by	Toshiyuki Kimori; Kohei Tanaka
Studio	Sunrise
Licensed by	Crunchyroll
Released	December 21, 1987 – April 21, 1988
Episodes	10
Original video animation
Dirty Pair: Flight 005 Conspiracy
Directed by	Toshifumi Takizawa
Written by	Yoshitake Suzuki
Music by	Tohru Okada
Studio	Nippon Sunrise
Licensed by	Crunchyroll
Released	January 25, 1990
Runtime	60 minutes
Other anime
Project Eden (animated film); Dirty Pair Flash (OVA series)

Dirty Pair (Japanese: ダーティペア, Hepburn: Dāti Pea) is a 1985 science fiction anime television series based on the novel series of the same name by Haruka Takachiho. Produced by Nippon Sunrise, the series aired on Nippon Television and its affiliates from July 15 to December 20, 1985. The TV series was followed by several direct-to-video (OVA) releases from 1985 to 1990.

The series has a closer setup to the original light novels than any of the other incarnations. Unlike the light novels, the universe of the anime has a more comical atmosphere and presents the typical styles of a 1980s inspired future. The Lovely Angels and the WWWA reside in a location known as Eleanor City where Kei and Yuri live in an apartment together in the city's famous Damocles Tower. The chief of the 3WA in this version is Gooley Andrew Francess along with Calico who serves as second in command. The duo also have two assistants, a genetically modified feline named Mughi, and a small robot known as Nanmo.

The series won the 1985 Animage Anime Grand Prix prize.

== Cast ==
Character	Japanese voice actor	English voice actor
Kei	Kyōko Tongū	Pamela Lauer
Yuri	Saeko Shimazu	Jessica Calvello
Mughi	Naoki Makishima	Brett Weaver
Gooley	Ikuya Sawaki	Jason Douglas

== Production and release ==
Produced by Nippon Sunrise, the series was directed by Toshifumi Takizawa with Norio Kashima taking over for episodes 15–26 with character designs by Tsukasa Dokite, mechanical designs by Junichi Akutsu, uniform designs by Fujihiko Hosono and music by Toshiyuki Kimori. Following its cancellation, two additional scripts had been written for two additional episodes. These episodes were ultimately produced and released as an OVA titled Dirty Pair: With Love from the Lovely Angels (ダーティペア ラブリーエンジェルより愛を込めて, Dirty Pair: Lovely Angels yori Ai o Komete) on VHS by VAP on January 1, 1987. Both episodes were retroactively added to the 1985 television series in rebroadcasts and international releases.

In 2001, the TV series (including the two extra OVA episodes) was licensed for release in North America by ADV in two DVD sets, and was re-released in March 2005 as the Original Dirty Pair Collection Box. It was licensed for a re-released by Nozomi Entertainment. The company released it into two box sets on November 2, 2010, and February 8, 2011, respectively, each containing 13 episodes. These releases contain Japanese dialog with English subtitles. It was also reported that David Williams from Sentai Filmworks did confirm that he offered to produce an English dub with Seraphim Digital for the re-release, but it was declined for reasons not stated. Dirty Pair was aired in North America on the Showtime Beyond channel.

On October 1, 2021, Nozomi Entertainment launched a Kickstarter campaign to release the original television series on Blu-ray, along with the creation of a new English dub to be produced by Headline Studios. The following day, after raising 75% of their $275,000 goal, Nozomi announced in an update that Jessica Calvello would be reprising her role as Yuri from the OVA series dub for the new dub of the original series. An update on October 13 revealed that Pamela Lauer, who last played Kei in the ADV dub of Project Eden in 2005, would be coming out of retirement to reprise her role. On October 30, after reaching $600,000, an update revealed that Jason Douglas would reprise his role as Gooley. The campaign closed on October 31, 2021, with a final pledge tally of $731,406. It was reported in April 2022 that the Blu-ray release would include "original music and effects" and the original version from ADV with "recreated music and effects." The dub was completed on May 30, 2024, as announced on the Kickstarter crowdfunding page for the Bluray release.

In August 2024, Crunchyroll stated that the Blu-ray release was in post-production but "suffering from delays". The company stated it was "fully committed" to the project; Anime News Network noted that English anime fans had expressed concerns about lack of communication from Crunchyroll or Nozomi Entertainment on the project's status and about how the acquisition of Right Stuf and Nozomi Entertainment may have "adversely affected the project". Prior to this update, Christopher Farris and Steve Jones of Anime News Network had criticized the lack of communication about the project and Crunchyroll's actions regarding the Blu-ray release, describing it as a "fiasco".

=== OVAs ===
==== Sequel ====
A 10-episode direct-to-video (OVA) sequel was released on December 21, 1987, through April 21, 1988. ADV released the OVA series on five English dubbed and subtitled VHS tapes from November 11, 1998, to January 25, 2000, each containing two episodes.

The series was later released to bilingual DVD in two five-episode volumes on July 17 and October 23, 2001. A complete collection was released on December 27, 2005. Nozomi Entertainment later re-licensed the OVA series, and re-released it in a remastered bilingual DVD set on January 3, 2012. This included an English dub with Pam Lauer voicing Kei and Jessica Calvello voicing Yuri, plus re-created music and audio effects, as the original wasn't available. This series has been called Original Dirty Pair or Dirty Pair 2 in English.

==== Specials ====
The series featured two stand-alone OVA hour-long features: Affair of Nolandia (ノーランディアの謎, Nōrandia no Nazo) (1985) and Flight 005 Conspiracy (謀略の005便, Bōryaku no 005-bin) (1990). The first revolves around a plot with the pair tracking down a psychic girl, while the second concerns the pair investigating a mysterious spaceship explosion. Both OVA features were released onto English dubbed VHS on November 23, 1994, and February 21, 1995, respectively by Streamline Pictures and Orion Pictures.

They were later re-licensed and re-dubbed by ADV Films and released to bilingual DVD on November 4 and December 2, 2003, respectively. ADV later re-released them to DVD, along with Project Eden, on November 8, 2005, in a 3-DVD boxset. They were later re-licensed by Nozomi Entertainment. The latter released them in a bilingual DVD set (with both Streamline and ADV dubs) with Project Eden on May 8, 2012, as part of the "Dirty Pair: Features DVD Collection".

== Reception ==
Critical reception of the Dirty Pair TV series has been generally positive, while the OVA series has been received slightly better.

Allen Moody of THEM Anime Reviews gave the Dirty Pair TV series a rating of 3 out of 5 stars, and the OVA series a 4 out of 5 star rating. Moody praised the humor, characters, the homages made to classic science fiction such as Star Trek, and plot twists in certain episodes, but criticized the pacing and the eighteenth episode for lifting part of its plot from Clint Eastwood's film The Gauntlet. Moody concluded that "the regular TV series does have its moments, but it's a bit too lightweight, the characters not quite as well defined as I'd like, and it reaches neither the level of humor nor the level of drama that the OAV episodes have occasionally achieved."

Theron Martin of Anime News Network gave the second half of the Dirty Pair TV series a C+ rating, praising the characters, humor, animation, homages to classic science fiction, but criticized the low amounts of continuity and the dated look of the series. Rebecca Silverman of Anime News Network gave the first half of the TV series a B rating, praising the story, soundtrack, artwork and characters, but like Martin, also criticized the low amounts of continuity and the dated look of the series.

Michael Toole of Anime News Network gave the Dirty Pair OVA series a B rating, praising the soundtrack, artwork, animation, characters, and scenarios, but criticized the series for not taking any new risks, citing the lack of big story arcs and plot twists. Toole ultimately concluded that "If you already know and love the Dirty Pair, this release is a no-brainer. Grab it up and get a step closer to completing your collection. If you love the look and luster of 80s anime, it's still a pretty good bet."

The Encyclopedia of Science Fiction described Dirty Pair as a reasonably enjoyable science fiction anime whose principal strength lies in the relationship between its protagonists, Kei and Yuri. Although it considered most of the adventures fairly routine and noted a decline in quality during the final quarter of the series, it praised the pair's entertaining banter, strong friendship and occasional laugh-out-loud humor. The encyclopedia highlighted their intelligence, technical abilities and competence relative to the male characters, despite their revealing outfits and romantic fantasies. It also identified several episodes with more unusual themes, including one exploring the consequences of artificially enhanced intelligence through an allusion to Flowers for Algernon, and another involving a transgender character and time dilation. The review further noted the series' numerous references to popular science-fiction franchises, including Star Wars, Star Trek and The Terminator.
