= Dirty Pair (disambiguation) =

Dirty Pair is a series of light novels written by Haruka Takachiho.

Dirty Pair may also refer to:

- Dirty Pair (anime), a 1985 television series
- Dirty Pair: Project Eden, a 1986 film based on the anime series
- Dirty Pair Flash, an OVA remake directed by Takahito Kimura
- The Dirty Pair, an original English-language manga series by Adam Warren
