= Miki Matsubara =

Japanese singer and songwriter (1959–2004)

- 松原 みき
- Matsubara in 1980
- Born: 28 November 1959; Kishiwada, Osaka, Japan
- Died: 7 October 2004 (aged 44); Sakai, Osaka, Japan
- Other name: Suzie Matsubara (スージー・松原)
- Occupations: Singer; songwriter
- Spouse: Masaki Honjo
- Musical career
- Genres: J-pop; city pop; jazz
- Instruments: Vocals; piano; keyboards
- Years active: 1978–2000
- Label: Pony Canyon

Miki Matsubara (松原 みき, Matsubara Miki; 28 November 1959 – 7 October 2004) was a Japanese singer and songwriter. She contributed to the opening and ending theme songs of the anime Gu-Gu Ganmo under the name Suzie Matsubara. Her 1979 debut song "Mayonaka no Door (Stay With Me)" became a hit, reaching No. 28 on the Oricon chart.

Believing that her cancer diagnosis was the result of the lifestyle she lived during her career, Matsubara retired and severed all connections to the music world in 2000, dying from cervical cancer four years later at the age of 44. Since 2020, "Mayonaka no Door" has become widely known overseas due to its use on TikTok and the resurgence of the city pop genre.

== Early life ==
Miki Matsubara was born 28 November 1959 in Kishiwada, Osaka. She spent her childhood in Hiraoka Town, an area of Nishi-ku in Sakai, Osaka. She grew up with her mother, father, and younger sister. Her mother was a jazz singer who sang with the jazz band and comedy group Crazy Cats, while her father was a board member of a hospital. Matsubara started learning the piano at the age of three and later became familiar with jazz. As a child, she went to Sakai's Hiraoka Elementary School. In 1972, she entered Poole Gakuin Junior High School. Around this time, she became interested in rock music and joined the rock band Kurei.

In 1975, Matsubara started at Poole Gakuin High School and became active as a keyboard player of the band Yoshinoya Band. They would play songs at a live house called Takutaku in Kyoto. Matsubara was described as an excellent student and was expected by many around her to attend college, but had already made plans to become a singer. In 1977, when she was still in high school, she went to Tokyo alone at the age of 17 to make her debut as a singer. The Japanese pianist Yuzuru Sera found her playing music and singing in various places across the Kantō region, such as in the live music venue Birdland in Roppongi.

== Career ==
Matsubara started her career in 1979 and is known from hit songs such as her debut and immediate breakthrough "Mayonaka no Door (Stay with Me)" which has been covered by numerous artists, including Akina Nakamori. The song was ranked 28th on the Oricon Chart, and according to that chart sold 104,000 copies and 300,000 copies announced by Canyon records. Some of her other known songs were "Neat na gogo san-ji (ニートな午後3時)" and "The Winner" among others.

Matsubara became a well-known singer after her song Neat na Gogo San-ji was released, performing at college festivals, concerts and so on. The song gained a feature in a commercial of the Japanese multinational personal care company Shiseido.

Miki Matsubara received a number of artist awards. She formed her own band, Dr. Woo. Matsubara also had some international work with Motown jazz fusion group Dr. Strut in Los Angeles (becoming a backing band in the album recordings for "Cupid" and "Myself"), Tokyo and Osaka (Hall concerts), later releasing a jazz cover album titled Blue Eyes. On that album she covered some famous jazz songs like "Love for Sale" and the soft rock song "You've Got a Friend", originally written and sung by Carole King.

Her vocal range was that of a mezzo-soprano.

During her music career she released 8 singles and 12 albums. While Matsubara was a star in Japan, she was known internationally for her work as an anime singer and songwriter, singing the opening and ending songs to anime such as Dirty Pair: Project Eden. The popularization of city pop has attracted new audiences outside of Japan. While singing theme songs for the anime Gu Gu Ganmo, she performed under the name Suzie Matsubara (スージー・松原). Matsubara's song "The Winner" was used as the opening for the Gundam OVA-series Mobile Suit Gundam 0083: Stardust Memory.

From the 1990s on she especially worked on anime soundtracks and music for commercials. Matsubara wrote songs for anime and some of her most known musical compositions were for the anime series Gundam. Matsubara wrote songs for several singers, including Hitomi Mieno, but her most notable works were likely with the singer and actress Mariko Kouda. Kouda's song "Ame no Chi Special" (雨のちスペシャル), which Matsubara composed, was featured in the five-minute music television and radio series Minna no Uta as a music video in 1997. It attracted a lot of attention and ranked 28th place on the Oricon chart. The song was repeatedly rebroadcast until 2004.

On 12 November 2024, producer Tetsuji Hayashi re‐arranged Matsubara's debut hit "Mayonaka no Door (Stay with Me)" and released it digitally as "2024".

Matsubara's unreleased cover of Hi-Fi Set's song "Sky Restaurant" was issued as a digital single on 5 December 2024. The Pony Canyon press release explains that Yumi Arai (Yuming) wrote the lyrics and Kunihiko Murai composed the music (this was a hit for Hi-Fi Set), and Matsubara's vocals from a stored tape were given a new city‑pop arrangement by Tetsuji Hayashi. (The same source also notes a new music video: directed by her nephew Tsuyoshi Matsubara and featuring her grand-niece Moka.)

== Personal life ==
Little is known about Matsubara's private life. Her husband, Masaki Honjo (1953–2007), was the drummer for her backing band. During her years as a student, her eyesight reportedly deteriorated due to fatigue from a part-time job, and was fixed with surgery.

== Illness and death ==
In late 2000, Matsubara sent an email to people including her company and the members of Dr. Woo, which read: "I can no longer continue with my music for a certain reason. I am canceling my phone, cell phone, and email. So please do not reply. Please live your life without regrets." She stopped all music activities and disappeared from the spotlight altogether. She burned all her cherished sheet music and records. In an email sent to her cousin, she wrote: "Please forget all the times in the past when I was singing and composing." In 2001, it was revealed that Matsubara's actions were prompted by a late-stage cancer diagnosis, after which she began treatment.

Matsubara returned to her parents' home and spent her final years battling her illness. According to a Japanese documentary, further emails were sent to various people, including her cousin and husband. The next email sent to her cousin read: "I think my lifestyle in this era brought me this disease. So I reset everything that prevents me from going forward. It reminds me of my weak point." In the same documentary, her father reported that Matsubara told him: "I want to do many things. I'm still thinking of them. So I don't want to die." Despite the fact that she cut off all connections with music, her father said that she mumbled about music while losing consciousness under anesthesia.

Despite being told by her doctor that she only had three months to live, Matsubara died in Sakai nearly four years later on 7 October 2004, at age 44, from complications of cervical cancer. Her death was announced to the public two months later. Her final email, written two months before her death, was read out at her funeral and said: "I realized many things for the first time after I was diagnosed. If possible, I want to be healthy [and] restart my life."

== Legacy ==
An increased interest in city pop during the 2000s particularly the 2010s, contributed to Matsubara gaining global recognition and "Stay with Me" (真夜中のドア, "Mayonaka no door") becoming a resurgent hit in the West and throughout Asia in 2020. Billboard Japan credited Indonesian YouTuber Rainych for the song's initial surge in popularity, after she shared a cover version with her 1.3 million YouTube subscribers in October 2020. To capitalize on her posthumous resurgence, record label Pony Canyon reissued Matsubara's first album Pocket Park as a 180g LP on 31 March 2021. "Stay With Me" had just spent 20 consecutive days at No. 1 on Spotify's Global Viral chart.

The song became known on TikTok, most notably during December 2020; prior to this, it was already somewhat popular with TikTok's anime community, where it sparked a trend among users of Japanese descent who in turn shared videos of themselves playing the song for their mothers and filming their reactions when they recognized the track. One such video garnered over 23 million views and 6 million likes. As of February 2021, audio from the song has been used in over 200,000 TikTok videos.

Although Matsubara died in 2004, a new director's cut of the music video for "Mayonaka no Door" was released via her official YouTube channel in November 2022. The updated video was re-edited by the original director Tell Sato.

In October 2024 at the Paris Paralympics, "Mayonaka no Door (Stay with Me)" was played on the center court at Stade Roland Garros after Japanese wheelchair tennis players won gold. Publishing company Pony Canyon released color‐vinyl editions of the Matsubara albums Cool Cut, Blue Eyes, and Lady Bounce for Japan's Record Day on 3 November 2024.

== Discography ==
=== Studio albums ===
Year	Title	Label
1980	Pocket Park	See･Saw
1980	Who Are You?	See･Saw
1981	Cupid	See･Saw
1982	Myself	See･Saw
1982	彩	See･Saw
1983	Revue	See･Saw
1984	Blue Eyes (cover album)	See･Saw
1984	Cool Cut	See･Saw
1985	Lady Bounce	See･Saw
1987	Dirty Pair (Original Soundtrack)	Victor
1988	Wink	Victor

=== Compilations ===
Year	Title	Label
1983	Paradise Beach	See･Saw
1986	Super Best	Pony
2002	Best	Pony Canyon
2011	Golden☆Best	Pony Canyon
2013	The Premium Best	Pony Canyon
2014	Light Mellow	Pony Canyon
2015	Aya	Pony Canyon
2017	Platinum Best	Pony Canyon

=== Magazines ===
Date of issue	Magazine name	Issuer	Page	Type	Title
1979-12-09	Weekly Myojo	Shueisha	End of book	Gravure	Debuted with "Midnight Door", a rich feeling cultivated through jazz and rock.
1980-01-01	Weekly Playboy	Shueisha	End of book	Gravure	The other side of midnight: contemporary music
1980-01-10	GORO	Shogakukan	End of book	Gravure	A love sounds singer aiming to be Japan's Diana Ross is born!
1980-01-22	Weekly Women's	Shufu to Seikatsusha	End of book	Gravure	50 people who were popular in the 1980s
1980-04-20	Weekly Myojo	Shueisha	p.92	Dialogue	Haruo Chikada's "In-depth Conversation" (22): My first love was in the third grade of elementary school, and she was 28 years old!
1980-04-22	Weekly Playboy	Shueisha	p.71	–	Miki Matsubara's braless incident has a cute face but likes music
1980-04-29	Weekly Women's	Shufu to Seikatsusha	p.42	–	A heated battle between the 7 favorites that color the post-Momoe era!
1980-05-06	Weekly Playboy	Shueisha	p.53	–	Miki Matsubara's carefree and simple life: "When it comes to a boyfriend, that's what I want"
1980-05-20	Weekly Playboy	Shueisha	Opening page	Gravure	MISS Fresh BEST 5: If she wants a sepia-colored love, her mood is "Manhattan"
1980-05-29	Weekly Sankei	Sankei Shimbun	End of book	Gravure	Girl time
1980-06	Playboy	Shueisha	p.27	–	MUSIC PLAY OFF: Miki Matsubara
1980-07	Lovely Lady	Fujin Seikatsusha	p.224	–	Woman's Heart / Singing Heart (Noboru Hayakawa)
1980-07-01	Weekly Playboy	Shueisha	p.73	–	Miki Matsubara's new professional spirit leads a RICH singer life
1980-08-19/26 (merged)	Weekly Women's	Shufu to Seikatsusha	p.93	–	Great fashion survey – list of 70 stars released! My fashion, hair, and makeup tips
1980-08-19/26 (merged)	Weekly Women's	Shufu to Seikatsusha	Mid-volume	Gravure	Secret Revealed! Star Fashion BOOK: Wearing New Autumn Fashion! Me Wearing Autumn...
1980-11-04	Weekly Playboy	Shueisha	p.46	Interview	Date in movie with Miki Matsubara who watched the movie Chapter 2 and had a deep ohanashi between a man and a woman
1980-12-23 / 1981-01-01 (merged)	Weekly Women's	Shufu to Seikatsusha	Opening page	Gravure	The last concert of '80 feels like Hollywood!
1981-01-01	Weekly Playboy	Shueisha	p.84	–	The Music Miki, known as the Space Cat, has a message for those who hate cats!
1981-01-15	Women Themselves	Kobunsha	p.67	–	Butamagamation! Something that surprised me recently
1981-02-03	Weekly Women's	Shufu to Seikatsusha	p.144	–	Spring cosmetics campaign: Miki Matsubara vs. Akiko Yano face-off!
1981-03-26	Women Themselves	Kobunsha	p.87	–	First release, a little MY privacy: Miki Matsubara's memo diary
1981-04-14	Young Lady	Kodansha	p.76	–	20-year-old woman confesses "my way of love": Miki Matsubara
1981-04-16	Women Themselves	Kobunsha	p.58	–	Worst Dressed Announcement: 19th place
1981-05-08	Weekly Post	Shogakukan	Opening page	Gravure	A NEET gal who dreams of becoming the No. 1 showgirl
1981-05-28	Women Themselves	Kobunsha	p.159	–	Young Star: 50 questions, 50 answers
1981-06-09	Young Lady	Kodansha	p.113	–	BOYS & GIRLS topic zoom-up: Miki Matsubara is the topic
1981-06-18	Women Themselves	Kobunsha	Opening page	Gravure	9 stars wearing their favorite summer formal wear
1981-09-27	Sunday Every Day	Mainichi Shimbun	p.43	–	Even the promoters were put to shame at the school festival, which was full of entertainment
1982-10-02	Weekly Jewels	Kobunsha	p.67	–	Wonderful Time Now: I want to approach you mysteriously!
1983-01-09	Sunday Every Day	Mainichi Shimbun	–	Gravure	Walking – (Early New Year '83: Would you like to run with a wild boar?)
1988-09-10	Smile	Shodensha	p.36	–	A kiss from my heart! Miki Matsubara: I long for a kiss, but there are also "contacts" so exciting that kisses fade
1989-07-20	Asahi Entertainment	Tokuma Shoten	p.12	Gravure	The enthusiastic "good woman" has returned as a mature woman! Miki Matsubara (29)
1989-07-20	Asahi Entertainment	Tokuma Shoten	pp.35–36	Interview	A complete look at the current status of 20 of those "good women"! (6) Miki Matsubara completes 4 years of "recharging" – "I started hanging out with strange archaeologists..."
Sources: Soichi Oya Bunko, ed. (1 June 1985). Oya Sōichi Bunko Magazine Article Index General Catalog Personal Name Edition 5. Kinokuniya Shoten.; Soichi Oya Bunko, ed. (20 January 1997). Oya Sōichi Bunko Magazine Article Index General Catalog 1988–1995 Personal Names Volume 4. Kinokuniya Shoten. ISBN 4-314-10121-0.; Toshio Otaka, ed. (20 February 1988). Weekly Magazine Article Index 81/87 People Edition Chi-wa. Nichigai Associates. ISBN 4-8169-0757-2.

=== Singles ===
Year	Title	Label
1979	"Mayonaka no Door (Stay with Me)" (真夜中のドア〜Stay With Me)	See･Saw
1979	"愛はエネルギー"	See･Saw
1980	"ハロー・トゥデイ〜Hello Today"	See･Saw
1980	"あいつのブラウンシューズ"	See･Saw
1981	"ニートな午後3時"	See･Saw
1981	"倖せにボンソワール"	See･Saw
1982	"予言"	See･Saw
1983	"パラダイス ビーチ (ソフィーのテーマ)""	See･Saw
1984	"Knock, Knock, My Heart"	See･Saw
1985	"恋するセゾン 〜色恋来い〜"	See･Saw
1987	"サファリ アイズ"	Victor
1987	"Pas De Deux"	Victor
1988	"In the Room"	Victor
2020	"The Winner"	Sunrise Music
2020	"Back to Paradise"	Sunrise Music
2021	"Miki Matsubara Night Tempo Presents the Showa Groove"	Pony Canyon

=== Some notable compositions ===
Year	Title	Artist
1991	"Mou Hitotsu no Sotsugyou" (もう一つの卒業)	a·chi-a·chi
1992	"Men of Destiny" – Mobile Suit Gundam 0083: Stardust Memory	MIO
1992	"True Shining"	Rumiko Wada
1994	"Good-Bye Tears"	Yumiko Takahashi
1994	"Harmony"	Mariko Kouda
1994	"Run ~今日が変わるMagic~"	Hitomi Mieno
1994	"誰のせいでもない二人"	Mariko Kouda
1995	"Kanjite itai..."	Yoko Ichikawa
1995	"Mimikaki wo Shiteiru to" (みみかきをしていると)	Mariko Kouda
1995	"Heroine" (ヒ・ロ・イ・ン)	Rumi Shishido
1995	"Doll-tachi no Dekuritsu Kinenbi" (Dollたちの独立記念日)	Hitomi Mieno
1995	"Ame no Kioku" (雨の記憶)	Keiko Yoshinari
1996	"Watashi ga Tenshi Dattara Iinoni" (私が天使だったらいいのに)	Mariko Kouda
1997	"Yume wa hitori miru mono janai" (夢はひとりみるものじゃない)	Mariko Kouda
1997	"Accel" (アクセル)	Mayumi Iizuka
1998	"Ultraman Gaia!" (ウルトラマンガイア!)	Masayuki Tanaka & Kazuya Daimon

== See also ==
- J-pop
- Mariko Kouda
- Mayumi Gojo
- Ojamajo Doremi
  - Ojamajo Doremi discography
- Victor Entertainment
  - Dirty Pair: Project Eden
  - Mobile Suit Gundam 0083: Stardust Memory
