= List of Dirty Pair episodes =

1985 anime episode list by Sunrise

This is a list of episodes of the Dirty Pair anime series by Sunrise based on the light novels by Haruka Takachiho. The original series ran from July 15 to December 26, 1985. The opening theme song of the series is "Ru-Ru-Ru-Russian Roulette" (ロ・ロ・ロ・ロシアン・ルーレット, Ro Ro Ro Roshian Rūretto) by Meiko Nakahara and the ending theme song is "Uchū Ren'ai (Space Fantasy)" (宇宙恋愛 (スペースファンタジー)), also by Meiko Nakahara.

== Series overview ==
Season	Episodes	Originally released	
Season	Episodes	First released	Last released
Season 1 (TV)	24	July 15, 1985	December 26, 1985
Season 1 finale (OVA)	2	January 3, 1987	January 3, 1987
Season 2 (OVA)	10	December 21, 1987	April 21, 1988

== Original anime ==
=== Television series (1985) ===
No.	Title	Original release date
1	"We'll Teach You How to Kill a Computer"; Transliteration: "Konpyuuta no Koroshikata Oshiemasu" (Japanese: コンピューターの殺し方教えます)	July 15, 1985
The master computer of Eleanor City's Damocles Tower known as Brian goes messing with the cities power and putting everyone in chaos. When the Lovely Angels are forced out of their apartment in the tower from all the chaos and try to find a way to disable Brian, they are surrounded by the technology in the city which the computer controls. Yuri and Kei stop it by warping a ship into the computer, destroying it, but ends up pushing the Damocles Tower to its side. The tower remains leaning for the rest of the series.
2	"Do Lovely Angels Like Chest Hairs?"; Transliteration: "Kawaii Tenshi wa Munage ga Osuki?" (Japanese: 可愛い天使は胸毛がお好き?)	July 22, 1985
After an unknown recent terrorist attacks on commercial space cruisers, the Lovely Angels—along with a senior operative of the 3WA known as Nova Grave—go aboard one of them to see if they can locate the cause of the recent attacks.
3	"Fall in Love Involuntarily! Love Is Russian Roulette"; Transliteration: "Katte ni Horena! Koi wa Roshian Rūretto" (Japanese: 勝手に惚れな! 恋はロシアンルーレット)	July 29, 1985
The Lovely Angels are sent to collect a legendary casino chip, where they infiltrate the owner's mansion as gamblers, and are unexpectedly helped by the owner's assistant, the attractive Sydney, who claims he has been sent by the 3WA to assist them.
4	"Pursuit Has the Smell of Cheesecake and Death"; Transliteration: "Tsuiseki wa Chīzukēki to Shi no Nioi" (Japanese: 追跡はチーズケーキと死のにおい)	August 5, 1985
A laboratory researching muscle enhancers loses a cat, Malatesta and the Lovely Angels are to find him.
5	"The Heartbeat of Criados"; Transliteration: "Kuriadosu no Dokkun Dokkun!" (Japanese: クリアドスのどっくんどっくん!)	August 12, 1985
While on vacation, the Lovely Angels are being chased by a swarm of robots, seemingly from Criados.
6	"Lots of Danger, Lots of Dummies"; Transliteration: "Kiken ga Ippai, Damī ga Ippai" (Japanese: 危険がいっぱいダミーがいっぱい)	August 19, 1985
While transporting a crystal to power a system, the Lovely Angels are attacked by pirates.
7	"Love Is Everything, Betting Their Lives on Elopement"; Transliteration: "Aikoso Subete Inochi Kakemasu Tōhikō!!" (Japanese: 愛こそすべて命賭けます逃避行!!)	August 26, 1985
The Lovely Angels must delivers a ransom to a save the rich heir of a huge corporation, but the relationship between abductor and abductee is not what it seems...
8	"Gotta Do It! Love Is a Woman's Detonator"; Transliteration: "Yarukkyaanai! Koi wa Onna no Kibakuzai" (Japanese: やるっきゃあない! 恋は女の起爆剤)	September 2, 1985
Yuri receives a message from a childhood friend, Billy, who had promised to build a ship and fly her to the moon. Now an engineer, he has been kidnapped with others to work on warships. Kei then pretends hire the WWWA so she can go with Yuri to rescue everybody.
9	"Hire Us! Beautiful Bodyguards Are a Better Deal"; Transliteration: "Uchira o Katte! Yōjinbō ni wa Bijin ga Otoku" (Japanese: うちらを買って! 用心棒には美人がお得)	September 16, 1985
Two cartels are fighting over the newstone ore on planet Plastone. The Lovely Angels each enroll a cartel on the western like planet, hoping to resolve the issue at hand with their usual finesse...
10	"What! We're the Heinous Kidnappers?"; Transliteration: "Eeeee? Uchira ga Kyōaku Yūkaihan!" (Japanese: えーっっっ? うちらが凶悪誘拐犯!)	September 23, 1985
The Lovely Angels must protect the prince of planet Caspia who is suddenly targeted by his corrupted uncle. They head to the planet Mordolin where the prince goes to university.
11	"Ho Ho Ho, Dresses and Men Are Better New"; Transliteration: "Ho Ho Ho, Doresu to Otoko wa Onyū ni Kagiru" (Japanese: ホホホ, ドレスと男はオニューに限る)	September 30, 1985
On their day-off, the Lovely Angels are repeatedly mistaken for a couple of notorious bank robbers. A pursuit and their wrath ensues...
12	"The Little Dictator! The Curse of the Touchy Secret"; Transliteration: "Chiisana Dokusaisha! Furanu Kimitsu ni Tatari Nashi" (Japanese: 小さな独裁者! 触らぬ機密にたたりなし)	October 7, 1985
A crucial piece of information about the Algernon security system has been stolen from the 3WA HQ. Fortunately the culprit is still locked down within the HQ, and the Lovely Angels are on the case. Algernon is a reference to "Flowers for Algernon", on which the story is loosely based.
13	"What's This?! Our Fair Skin Is Getting Slimy"; Transliteration: "Nani yo Kore! Tama no Ohada ga Doron Doron" (Japanese: 何よこれ! 玉のお肌がドロンドロン)	October 14, 1985
The Lovely Angels are sent to the sewers of Damocles Tower to deal with a mutated space pest, but they're in for a surprise...
14	"The Vault or the Election? The Convention Hides the Killer"; Transliteration: "Kinko ka Senkyo ka? Enzetsukai wa Satsujin Biyori" (Japanese: 金庫か選挙か? 演説会は殺人びより)	October 21, 1985
The 3WA holds a meeting for a political candidate, but the HQ undergoes an attack at the same time. The Lovely Angels will find out if the two are related...
15	"Dig Here Meow Meow, the Reward Comes in the Very End"; Transliteration: "Koko Hore Nyan Nyan Kahou wa Saigo ni Yattekuru" (Japanese: ここ掘れニャンニャン果報は最後にやってくる)	October 28, 1985
On a holiday on a resort island, the Lovely Angels help an old man who is being pursued. It turns out he is a treasure hunter looking for a big prize, Kei and Yuri decide they want their share...
16	"Leave It to Us! The WWWA Is a Wonderful Job"; Transliteration: "Makasenasai! WWWA wa Suteki no Oshigoto" (Japanese: まかせなさい! WWWAは素敵なお仕事)	November 4, 1985
The Lovely Angels act as bodyguards for the Yorozuya corporation's heiress. They hang around town when the assassination attempts start...
17	"Come Out, Come Out, Assassin"; Transliteration: "Dete Koi Dete KoiAnsatsusha" (Japanese: 出てこい出てこい 暗殺者)	November 11, 1985
The Lovely Angels need to lure out the deadly assassin Sundric as their space shuttle is crashing into a black hole!
18	"Excuse Us, the Running Trouble, Violent Breakthroughs"; Transliteration: "Gomen Asobase Hashiru Meiwaku Kyoukoutoppa" (Japanese: ごめんあそばせ 走る迷惑強行突破!)	November 18, 1985
While catching a thief named JD, the Lovely Angels learn he is to testify against a major syndicate...
19	"Let Love Dispel the Returned Hatreds and the Hatred of Love"; Transliteration: "Koi no Urami to Sakaurami Urami Harasazu Usasete" (Japanese: 恋の恨みと逆恨み 恨みはらさず愛させて)	November 25, 1985
Lore Reamonn is in love with his doll Meshuzera, that the Lovely Angels accidentally broke. Their task is to find the culprit...
20	"The Pursuit of Blues Is the BGM of Murder"; Transliteration: "Tsuioku no Burūsu wa Koroshi no BGM" (Japanese: 追憶のブルースは 殺しのBGM)	December 2, 1985
While looking for the assassin Blues, the Lovely Angels get against a ruling gang on volcanic planet Saladeen...
21	"You're Kidding! 463 People Disappear"; Transliteration: "Ussoo! Kieta yonhyakurokujūsannin?" (Japanese: うっそー! 消えた463人?)	December 9, 1985
A spaceship lands at a planetary space port, but the crew and all the passengers have vanished into thin air! Kei and Yuri team up with an investigator called Eddie Ross whose daughter is among the missing. First of a two-part episode.
22	"We Did It! 463 People Reappear"; Transliteration: "Yatta ne! Detekita yonhyakurokujūsannin" (Japanese: やったね! 出てきた463人)	December 16, 1985
The mystery of the vanished passengers continues. A ransom note demands "File-E". Eddie knows what it is, but is being uncooperative. To solve the case the Lovely Angels have to figure out the secrets of Eddie and his family. Second of a two-part episode.
23	"Uncertainty...? Our Magnificent Revenge"; Transliteration: "Fu'an da wa ...!? Uchira no karei naru hōfuku" (Japanese: 不安だわ…!? うちらの華麗なる報復)	December 23, 1985
A drug kingpin has created a new drug. When the Lovely Angels prepare to raid his operation they are told to back off. They decide to go after him in another way with the help of a conman called Daniel Sezar.
24	"Are You Serious? The Apartment Is a Dangerous Address"; Transliteration: "Kanari maji? Manshon wa kiken na adoresu" (Japanese: かなりマジ? マンションは危険なアドレス)	December 26, 1985
The Lovely Angels must catch a serial killer who kills beautiful women in condos and poses as a salesman...

=== With Love from the Lovely Angels OVAs (1987) ===
These did not originally air on television. They were produced in 1986 and were released as a two episode OVA titled Dirty Pair: With Love From the Lovely Angels.

No.	Title	Original release date
25	"Eek! The Boy in the Manor Is a Terminator"; Transliteration: "Hiee! Yōkan no bōya wa tāminētā" (Japanese: ひええっ！洋館の坊やはターミネーター)	January 3, 1987
Yuri is on a terrible date. Meanwhile, much to her dismay, Kei has to team up with Calico to go arrest a counterfeiter who lives on a well-defended island.
26	"R-Really?! For Beautiful Women, "Canon" Is the Keyword to Escape"; Transliteration: "Ho, honki!? Bijo ni kyanonhō wa dasshutsu kiiwādo"" (Japanese: ホ，本気⁉ 美女にキャノン砲は脱出のキーワード)	January 3, 1987
A team of 3WA security officers mutiny and have taken over a weapons research lab. The Lovely Angels must prevent the destruction of Eleanor City and save their kidnapped boss.

=== Dirty Pair 2 OVA series (1987–1988) ===
The 10-episode OVA series, also titled Dirty Pair 2. The opening theme song of the series is "By Yourself" by Miho Morikawa and the ending theme song is "Aki Kara no Summertime" (Summertime from Autumn) by Yuko Nitou.

No.	Title	Original release date
1	"Prison Revolt! We Hate Stubborn People"; Transliteration: "Shūjin-tachi no Komatta Hanran Nenimotsu Hitotte Daikirai!" (Japanese: 囚人達の困った反乱 根に持つ人って大嫌い！)	December 21, 1987
2	"Count Us Out! Ultimate Halloween Party"; Transliteration: "Maki Zo e Gomen! Tenchimuyō no Harouin Pāti" (Japanese: まきぞえごめん！天地無用のハロウィンパーティ)	December 21, 1987
3	"Challenge to the Gods! We're Not Afraid of Your Divine Wrath"; Transliteration: "Tenbatsu Nanka Kawakunai Tekimen?! Kami no Chōsen-jō" (Japanese: 天罰なんかこわくない てきめん?!神の挑戦状)	January 21, 1988
4	"They're Only Kids? Wargamers Must Die"; Transliteration: "Gaki Dakaratte Nani yo! Sensō-gokko wa Jūsatsu-kei?!" (Japanese: ガキだからってなによ！戦争ごっこは銃殺刑?!)	January 21, 1988
5	"And Then No One Played"; Transliteration: "Soshite Dare mo Shinaku Natta" (Japanese: そして誰もしなくなった)	February 21, 1988
6	"What? A Surprise Seaside Wedding Panic"; Transliteration: "Honkina no?! Umibede Dokkiri Uedingu Panikku!" (Japanese: 本気なの?!海辺でどっきりウェディングパニック！)	February 21, 1988
7	"Rigged Ring? Revenge of the Muscle Lady"; Transliteration: "Ribenji・Obu・Za・Kinniku (Massuru) Redi On'na no Ijitte Ringu no Hana?!" (Japanese: リベンジ・オブ・ザ・筋肉マッスル({{{2}}})レディ 女の意地ってリングの華?!)	March 21, 1988
8	"This Girl Is My Elder! Sleeping Beauty"; Transliteration: "Ano Musume wa Toshiue Hozopn wa Ryōkō?! Surīpingu Byūti" (Japanese: あの娘は年上 保存は良好?!スリーピングビューティ)	March 21, 1988
9	"Slaughter Squad! Red Eyed Hell Signal"; Transliteration: "Akai Medama wa Jigoku no Shigunaru Satsuriku Shōtai (Surōtā・Sukuwaddo) o Oe!" (Japanese: 赤い目玉は地獄のシグナル 殺戮小隊スローター・スクワッド({{{2}}})を追え！)	April 21, 1988
10	"Evil Speaks for Itself! Space Truckers"; Transliteration: "Warui Yatsura nya Goikenmuyō Uchi-ra Uchū no Torakku Yarō!" (Japanese: 悪い奴らにゃ御意見無用 うちら宇宙のトラック野郎！)	April 21, 1988
