= Fujihiko Hosono =

Japanese manga artist

- Born: December 2, 1959 (age 66); Ōta, Tokyo, Japan
- Occupation: Manga artist

Fujihiko Hosono (細野 不二彦, Hosono Fujihiko; born December 2, 1959) is a Japanese manga artist. Hosono was born in Ōta, Tokyo. In 1979, he made his debut with Crusher Joe while he was a student at Keio University. Around the same time, he joined the Studio Nue (スタジオぬえ) as an animator. He has had stories published in the manga anthology series Petit Apple Pie.

Hosono is the author of Gallery Fake and Tarō as well, for which two he won Shogakukan Manga Award for general manga in 1996.

== Works ==
- Bio Hunter
- Crusher Joe
- Dirty Pair (uniform design for TV series and With Love from the Lovely Angels OVA episodes)
- Dokkiri Doctor
- Double Face (ダブル・フェイス)
- Gallery Fake
- Taro
- Gu Gu Ganmo
- Judge
- Mama
- Male Transfrom Female Mayumi chan (男変形女マユミちゃん)
- Sasuga no Sarutobi (さすがの猿飛)
- The Qwaser of Stigmata (episode 21 end illustration)
- Castle of Broadcast
- Devilman Gaiden -Ningen Senki-
