= Shizuka Ishikawa =

Japanese voice actress (born 1971)

Shizuka Ishikawa (石川 静, Ishikawa Shizuka; born March 29, 1971), also known under the name Chizuru Kusaka (日下 千鶴, Kusaka Chizuru), is a Japanese voice actress who specializes in voicing characters in adult video games. She is a member of the Tokyo Actor's Consumer's Cooperative Society.

== Filmography ==
=== Anime ===
- Cardfight!! Vanguard – Kamui Katsuragi
- Cardfight!! Vanguard G – Kamui Katsuragi
- Comic Party – Eimi Oba
- Dokkiri Doctor – Hongō Yukihiro
- Fafner of the Azure – Kiyomi Kaname
- Flame of Recca – Kurei (child)
- Haré+Guu – Sagin
- Live On Cardliver Kakeru – Kakeru Amao
- Mirmo! – Wind
- Naruto – Inari
- Naruto Shippūden – Inari
- Oden-kun – Konbu-kun, Meat-boy
- Saru Get You -On Air- – Kakeru
- Sket Dance – Mrs. Tsubaki
- Sumomo mo Momo mo – Tenchi Koganei (Ep. 17)

=== Games ===
- Chijoku no Kankei 2
- Comic Party
- Eve
- Gyangyan Bunny 6 i♥mail
- Kizumono no Gakuen case of saint spica
- Kizumono no Shōjo Kizumoto no Gakuen Gaiden
- Mahō Tenshi Misaki
- One: Kagayaku Kisetsu e
- Ore no Miko-san
- Refrain Blue
- Sacrifice: Seifuku Kari
- Snowboard Kids 2 – Wendy
- White Princess
- Yuki Uta

=== Tokusatsu ===
- Engine Sentai Go-onger as Engine Toripter
- Engine Sentai Go-onger: Boom Boom! Bang Bang! GekijōBang!! as Engine Toripter
- Engine Sentai Go-onger vs. Gekiranger as Engine Toripter
- Samurai Sentai Shinkenger vs. Go-onger: GinmakuBang!! as Engine Toripter
