= Beauty Pair =

Tag team
- Members: Jackie Sato; Maki Ueda
- Name: The Beauty Pair
- Billed heights: Jackie Sato: 5 ft 8 in (1.73 m); Maki Ueda: 5 ft 6 in (1.68 m)
- Debut: February 24, 1976
- Years active: 1976–1979

The Beauty Pair were a professional wrestling tag team and Japanese female pop music duo consisting of Jackie Sato and Maki Ueda. Formed in 1976 in All Japan Women's Pro-Wrestling, the Beauty Pair would become an extremely popular group throughout their run, propelling AJW to mainstream popularity while also becoming teen idols in their own right with a successful Japanese pop music career. They would be the primary attraction for AJW until 1979, when they retired as an active tag team.

Wrestling historian Dave Meltzer has stated that the pair were drawing "NFL-level television ratings" that "blew away the Attitude Era and Hogan era" during the peak of their career. It's been stated after their retirement that the pair paved the way for the Crush Gals, a tag team for AJW in the 80's which also had success in both their music and professional wrestling careers.

== Formation and Success ==
Formed on February 24, 1976, in AJW, the pair defeated Sylvia Hackney and Sonia Oriana for the WWWA World Tag Team Championships. This, alongside their matches against the Black Pair (Yumi Ikeshita and Shinobu Aso, a tag team created specifically to work as heels against the Beauty Pair), solidified the Beauty Pair as main event stars for the promotion throughout the late 70's.

They're well known as one of the first successful tag team idol groups in women's professional wrestling, combining their professional wrestling success with a Japanese pop music career. Their record debut, Kakemeguru Seishun, which they would sing before entering the ring, sold over 800,000 copies. Their success would inspire such acts as the Crush Gals and the Jumping Bomb Angels.

=== Influence and legacy ===
During their height in popularity, the Beauty Pair collaborated with popular acts such as Pink Lady, one of the most successful Japanese pop duos at the time. In 1977, the pair starred in a movie titled Red-Hot Youth, in which they played themselves.

They had also inspired the popular manga and anime series Dirty Pair, after creator Haruka Takachiho watched them perform alongside A. Bertram Chandler.

=== Retirement ===
According to Maki, during her active years, she and Jackie rarely talked to each other and never hung out in private during their time as an active duo.

Three years after the duo was formed, without consulting Jackie, Maki decided to break up the duo and went directly to the president of AJW. The president offered to give her a retirement match, in which she'd have to retire from the business after losing. Maki accepted this, and on January 4, 1979, at the All Women's Korakuen Hall event, Maki announced the event, stating “I will put everything I have on the line and challenge you." In response to Maki's announcement, Jackie replied that she "doesn't understand why you are challenging me to retire."

Immediately after their match, which was held on February 2, 1979, the two did not visit each other's waiting room and broke up without exchanging a single word. Maki said, “I didn't feel comfortable talking to her because it would have been strange for me, a loser, to talk to her in a match that was about to end in retirement." In contrast, Jackie said, “It's not like we won't be able to see each other forever, and I'd like for us to meet again in the future when we have gone our separate ways and grown as individuals."

== After the breakup ==
Jackie would continue performing as an active professional wrestler until 1988, while Maki returned to her native Tottori Prefecture. Though they would see each other occasionally, they had lost contact for about 20 years.

In 1998, Maki contacted Jackie to invite her to be a guest at the 10th anniversary of her restaurant, and they later went on a hot spring trip alone. Later, she received a letter from Jackie, saying “I really enjoyed myself the other day. Let's go somewhere together again soon.” Maki was looking forward to seeing her again; however, about a year later, Jackie died due to stomach cancer, and their reunion never took place.

Before her death, Jackie told her acquaintances not to tell Maki about her illness, saying, “I don't want Maki to see me in a weakened state. I want to see her with a smile on my face when I am well again after recovering from my illness." Maki first learned of Jackie's illness through a phone call from wrestler Nancy Kumi, which came shortly after Jackie's death.

== Championships and accomplishments ==
- All Japan Women's Pro-Wrestling

- WWWA World Tag Team Championship (2 times)
- AJW Hall of Fame (1998) – both individually

- Wrestling Observer Newsletter

- Wrestling Observer Newsletter Hall of Fame (Class of 2023)
