= Mayonaka no Door =

1979 song by Miki Matsubara

"Mayonaka no Door (Stay with Me)"

Single by Miki Matsubara

from the album Pocket Park
- Language: Japanese
- Released: November 5, 1979
- Genre: City pop; disco
- Length: 5:13
- Label: Pony Canyon
- Composer: Tetsuji Hayashi
- Lyricist: Yoshiko Miura

Miki Matsubara singles chronology
"Mayonaka no Door (Stay with Me)" (1979)	"Ai wa Energy" (1979)

Audio sample
- "Mayonaka no Door": file; help

Audio
- "真夜中のドア/Stay with Me" on YouTube

"Mayonaka no Door (Stay with Me)" (Japanese: 真夜中のドア〜Stay with Me, Hepburn: Mayonaka no Doa~Stay with Me; lit. 'Midnight's Door~Stay with Me') is the debut single by Japanese singer Miki Matsubara, released on November 5, 1979 (Shōwa 54). The song saw a resurgence in popularity in 2020, 41 years after its original release.

== Composition and release ==
Matsubara recorded "Mayonaka no Door" when she was 19 years old; two years prior to her debut, she had moved from her hometown of Osaka to Tokyo and performed in clubs in the city. Tetsuji Hayashi, the composer of the song, created a track that followed the emerging "new music" style that drew influences from Western music, a genre that would come to be known as city pop. The song's particular use of the English phrase, "Stay with Me", was noted by Billboard as grabbing "the interest of non-Japanese listeners" while paying homage to its Western influence.

In an interview with The Japan Times, Hayashi praised the upcoming singer's voice, saying: "I didn't expect her to have a very mature voice, much more than her actual age, but it was jazzy... even sexy." The song itself is about a woman who wants her lover to stay with her, especially after having a memory of him from the previous night.

The song was commercially successful: it peaked at 28th on the Oricon Singles Chart and boosted the popularity of both Matsubara and Hayashi. While Matsubara would release a lot more music in her future career, "Mayonaka no Door" is widely considered her greatest work.

== Resurgence ==
In late 2020, "Mayonaka no Door" saw a surge in popularity among international audiences. Billboard attributes this wave to Indonesian singer Rainych, who regularly covers Japanese songs. In October, Rainych uploaded a cover of "Mayonaka no Door" to her YouTube channel, resulting in the song gaining popularity in Indonesia, where it then spread to the rest of the world. In January of the same year coincidentally, Malaysian indie rock band Grey Sky Morning had produced a song titled "Wajah-Wajah (Sahabat)" which interpolates "Mayonaka no Door" as part of its chorus subsequently crediting Tetsuji Hayashi as co-composer.

The song appeared on the popularity charts of music streaming services such as Spotify and Apple Music. Around the same time, the song was used in an internet trend on the video-sharing platform TikTok, where people played the song for their Japanese mothers and recorded their reaction as they recognized the melody. The popularity of "Mayonaka no Door" in the 2020s is an example of Showa retro.

On 4 February 2022, during an interview with NHK, Hayashi (the composer) said that he believed the key to the song's resurgence was that people were used to streaming music. He also said: "This song was Miki Matsubara's debut, but I felt she had already perfected it as a singer. This kind of thing is not often the case."

In 2024, Korean actor and singer, Byeon Woo-seok, performed the song in his fan meet in Japan, Summer Letter in Tokyo, further cementing the timelessness of "Mayonaka no Door".

In July 2026, "Mayonaka no Door" amassed over 500 million streams on Spotify, becoming the 10th Japanese-language song and the first Japanese song released in the 20th century to achieve this milestone.

== Charts ==
=== Weekly charts ===
Weekly chart performance for "Mayonaka no Door"
Chart (1979)	Peak position
Japan (Oricon)	28

Chart (2022–2025)	Peak position
Japan (Oricon)	26
Japan Top Singles Sales (Billboard Japan)	27
Global Japan Songs Excl. Japan (Billboard Japan)	1

== See also ==
- 1979 in Japanese music
- "Plastic Love", a Japanese city pop song by Mariya Takeuchi that saw a resurgence in 2017
