= Dokkiri Doctor =

Japanese manga series by Fujihiko Hosono and its anime adaptation

- Manga volume 1 cover

どっきりドクター (Dokkiri Dokutā)
- Genre: Comedy
- Manga
- Written by: Fujihiko Hosono
- Published by: Shogakukan
- Imprint: Shōnen Sunday Comics
- Magazine: Weekly Shōnen Sunday
- Original run: March 18, 1981 – February 3, 1982
- Volumes: 4
- Anime television series
- Directed by: Kazunori Mizuno
- Produced by: Ken Hagino; Katsunori Narumo; Madoka Takiyama
- Written by: Satoru Nishizono
- Music by: Hiromoto Tobisawa
- Studio: Studio Pierrot
- Original network: Fuji TV
- Original run: October 21, 1998 – June 23, 1999
- Episodes: 27
- icon

Dokkiri Doctor (Japanese: どっきりドクター, Hepburn: Dokkiri Dokutā) is a Japanese manga series written and illustrated by Fujihiko Hosono. It was serialized in Shogakukan's shōnen manga magazine Weekly Shōnen Sunday from March 1981 to February 1982, with its chapters collected in four tankōbon volumes. A 27-episode anime television series adaptation by Pierrot was broadcast on Fuji TV from October 1998 to June 1999.

== Story ==
Dokkiri Doctor chronicles events in the life of Dr. Haruka Nishikikōji, a humorous overweight school doctor who manages his school's clinic and health center, a medieval castle–like complex situated on the school's rooftop, and the inventions he conjures to impress his childhood friend and nurse, Miyuki Koizumi, and to assist his students, but which often lead to a large amount of highly embarrassing and funny situations and adventures for the doctor, Miyuki and the students and the teachers of his school.

== Characters ==
Dr. Haruka Nishikikōji (錦小路はるか, Nishikikōji Haruka)
Voiced by: Koichi Yamadera
Dr. Haruka is an overweight, kind-hearted school doctor dedicated to supporting his students. He harbors unspoken feelings for Miyuki, a nurse and his childhood friend, often attempting to impress her with bizarre inventions. These devices, though well-intentioned, frequently backfire, causing chaotic and embarrassing situations for the school's staff and students. Operating from a clinic resembling a medieval castle, he struggles to confess his feelings due to both shyness and the unintended consequences of his creations.
Miyuki Koizumi (小泉みゆき, Koizumi Miyuki)
Voiced by: Houko Kuwashima
Miyuki, the school nurse and Dr. Haruka's childhood friend, frequently helps resolve the chaos caused by his malfunctioning inventions. A skilled martial artist, she has won numerous competitions.
Mayumi Koizumi (小泉真由美, Koizumi Mayumi)
Voiced by: Ritsuko Kasai
Miyuki's younger sister, and a student at the school.
Yukihiro Hongō (本郷ユキヒロ, Hongō Yukihiro)
Voiced by: Shizuka Ishikawa
A student of the school and Mayumi's classmate, with whom he has a crush.
Hajime Mizukoshi (水越一, Mizukoshi Hajime)
Voiced by: Shigeru Chiba
One of the male teachers at the school. A sly person who is often an unwilling victim of Dr. Haruka's inventions, he is a close confidante of the vice principal, with whom he often unites to find ways of getting Dr. Haruka fired from the school.
Rokoro Shibuya (渋谷禄郎, Shibuya Rokoro)
Voiced by: Kenichi Ogata
The school's vice principal collects ancient artifacts, many of which suffer damage due to Dr. Haruka's inventions. He favors Nanahoshu pastries.
Tamotsu Abe (阿部保, Abe Tamotsu)
Voiced by: Kentarō Itō
A muscular and confident teacher at the school, he frequently shows off his physique. He often attempts, without success, to win Miyuki's affection.
Hideko Ikeda (池田秀子, Ikeda Hideko)
Voiced by: Ayako Kawasumi
A female teacher at the school. A delicate person, she often faints when faced with the shocking situations that often occur due to Dr. Haruka's inventions.
Kaori Tajima (田島かおり, Tajima Kaori)
Voiced by: Kurumi Mamiya
A little girl who is a student at the school who is often helped by the kind and lovable doctor. She has a crush on her friend Gen.
Gen Genda (玄田ゲン, Genda Gen)
Voiced by: Makoto Tsumura
A little boy who is a student at the school and a friend of Kaori. He is also quite popular with his female classmates.
Yoshiko Shinagawa (品川良子, Shinagawa Yoshiko)
Voiced by: Yoshiko Okamoto
The school's principal.
Tai (タイ), Shoku (ショク), Kin (キン)
The hungry germs, Tai, Shoku and Kin, were a group of germs created by Dr. Haruka.

== Media ==
=== Manga ===
Written and illustrated by Fujihiko Hosono, Dokkiri Doctor was serialized in Shogakukan's shōnen manga magazine Weekly Shōnen Sunday from March 18, 1981, to February 3, 1982. Shogakukan collected its chapters in four tankōbon volumes, released from October 19, 1981, to April 19, 1982.

==== Volumes ====
No.	Release date	ISBN
1	October 19, 1981	4-09-120621-2
2	January 20, 1982	4-09-120622-0
3	March 19, 1982	4-09-120623-9
4	April 19, 1982	4-09-120624-7

=== Anime ===
A 27-episodes anime television series adaptation produced by Pierrot and SPE Visual Works aired on Fuji TV between October 21, 1998, and June 23, 1999. The opening theme is Nenai Nenai Nenai (ねない ねない ねない), performed by The Castanets. The first ending theme (episodes 1–19) is I Wish, performed by Electric Combat, and the second ending theme (episodes 20–26) is Make it Somehow, performed by Luka.
