= Rainych =

Indonesian singer (born 1992)

- Also known as: Rain (れいん, Rein)
- Born: 20 October 1992 (age 33); West Sumatra, Indonesia
- Origin: Riau, Indonesia
- Genres: City pop; J-pop
- Occupations: Singer; YouTuber
- Instruments: Vocals; programming
- Years active: 2016–present
- Labels: Sprite:Wall; Sony Music Japan
- Member of: WACAVA
- Scientific career
- Fields: Robotics

YouTube information
- Channel: Rainych Ran
- Years active: 2015–present
- Genre: Music
- Subscribers: 2.47 million
- Views: 290 million
- Last updated: 4 August 2026

Japanese name
- Hiragana: れいにっち
- Katakana: レイニッチ
Transcriptions
- Romanization: Reinitchi

Rainych Ran (/ˈreɪnɪtʃ ˈrɑːn/ RAY-nitch RAHN; born 20 October 1992), better known mononymously as Rainych, is an Indonesian singer and YouTuber. She is notable for her renditions of city pop, vocaloid, anime, and J-pop songs, such as "Mayonaka no Door" and "Plastic Love". She is also known for her Japanese covers of English songs, such as "Say So" and "Blinding Lights", which have been praised by both their original singers, Doja Cat and The Weeknd, respectively.

== Early life ==
Rainych Ran was born on 20 October 1992, in West Sumatra. She began singing when she was in elementary school and showed an interest in anime and manga as a teenager. Before gaining attention as a YouTuber, she taught robotics at a vocational school.

== Career ==
=== 2015–2018: Early career ===
Rainych struggled with various life problems and depression until the end of 2015, but she created her YouTube channel on 27 May 2015 (JST) and began uploading renditions of Japanese song covers on YouTube from her bedroom starting in 2016. By the end of 2018, her YouTube channel had about 9,000 subscribers. She expressed her gratitude to the fans that supported her on her Facebook page.

=== 2019–2020: Rise to prominence ===
Rainych did not show her face in her uploads until early 2019, when she released a rendition of the theme song to the anime Dororo. Her covers of hit songs, such as "Lemon" and "Gurenge," achieved millions of views, and her rendition of "Omae wa Mou (Tiny Little Adiantum)" became a hit. On 18 November 2019 (JST), via her indie label Sprite:Wall, she released her first single for the global market, a Japanese-English song entitled "Time-Lapse".

In March 2020, she released a Japanese cover version of Doja Cat's single "Say So" in a style reminiscent of 80's city pop, which catapulted her into anti-mainstream recognition. Translated by fellow YouTuber Datenkou, the video went viral and gained the attention of Doja Cat while on an Instagram livestream after a fan suggested that she listen to Rainych's cover of "Say So". Doja Cat praised her during the livestream, calling her voice "beautiful". Rainych expressed her appreciation on Twitter and conveyed her gratitude to the fan who suggested the song.

Her cover of "Plastic Love" also attracted attention, garnering coverage from Japanese media. On 23 August 2020, she appeared on the NHK-BS program Cool Japan ~Hakkutsu! Kakkoī Nippon~, where she performed her cover of "Mayonaka no Door". In August, she also shared her Japanese rendition of The Weeknd's song "Blinding Lights", which received praise from The Weeknd himself on his SNS.

=== 2020–present: Debut in Japan ===
"It's totally unreal (laughs) that I was just singing in my bedroom, but then I realized I could put out a song on the label. Oh, that's right, I'm singing in my bedroom..."

— Rainych commented regarding her Japan debut

With praise heaped on by Doja Cat and The Weeknd, Rainych's career path has surfaced to the Japanese market. On 2 October 2020 (JST), she made her Japanese debut with the remix of her cover of "Say So" by Tofubeats, following her announcement in the preceding days. On 29 October 2020, she uploaded a cover of Miki Matsubara's 1979 song "Mayonaka no Door", which was arranged by Natsuki Harada of Evening Cinema, with the cover gaining popularity in Indonesia.

The cover led people to rediscover the original, and is attributed by Billboard as the reason the original gained popularity throughout the rest of the world. On 11 December 2020, she covered Momoko Kikuchi's song "Blind Curve", and was praised by Momoko Kikuchi herself.

On 26 January 2021, TikTok Japan announced that Rainych was chosen as a guest of the TikTok LIVE "Show What な Night" on 30 January 2021.

On 22 March 2021, Sony Music Japan announced Rainych's first EP, consisting of 7-inch custom pink vinyl covers of "Mayonaka no Door" and "Blind Curve". Several days later, she released a cover of Tatsuro Yamashita's song "Ride on Time". Her first EP officially released on 26 May 2021, and quickly sold out at Sony Music Shop and other Japanese music stores. As a result, it peaked at No. 49 on the Oricon charts. On 23 June 2021, Sony Music Japan announced Rainych's second EP, which was a 7-inch vinyl record entitled "RIDE ON TIME / Say So -Japanese Version- (tofubeats Remix)". It was officially released on 28 August 2021.

In early January 2022, Rainych released "Kanashimi wo Yasashisa ni" cover version to participate in the 20th anniversary of the anime series Naruto. In March 2022, she confirmed her collaboration in Maki Nomiya's "Sweet Soul Revue" self-cover project, which was reported by media in the preceding days before being confirmed.

== Public image ==
Rainych has been praised for her appearance; Jane Su and Mika Horii of TBS Radio both described her in a single word as "kawaii". Jane Su has specifically noted Rainych as "a girl with shiny mochi-like skin". Her vocals and musicality has been noted for being "sophisticated". The media has represented her voice as cute, light, unique, and transparent, and she has been referred to as an utahime ("diva", "song princess") and a "cover monster". Saito Takashi of Meiji University described her Japanese language songs as being brilliant, fresh, and surprising.

Rainych has often been cited as an influencer within the music industry. Yoshihiro Kawasaki of Pony Canyon attributed Rainych's fame to her enormous influence, and stated that she had brought to the forefront anew some of the greatest Japanese works through her voice and character. According to Noriko Ashizawa of Spotify Japan, her figure has a direct connection with the current popularity of city pop, particularly in Indonesia, where there is a high affinity with Japanese culture and J-pop culture.

Kento Nakajima of Sexy Zone has cited Rainych as his "favorite painter", and stated that she is an artist who draws city pop style paintings and currently attracting a lot of attention in Japan. Not only her popularity burst in Japan but also Rainych's popularity spans almost the entire world; she has fans in more than 100 countries.

== Musical style and influences ==
Through her works, she is known as a J-pop singer. Her musical style has been recognized as city pop, alongside other genres for other covers. With the release of her Japanese covers of "Say So" and "Blinding Lights" in 2020, her musical style expanded, and linked the Japanese and US markets. Her themes are influenced by the J-pop culture that has affected her. Rainych has cited Reol and LiSA as particularly influential artists.

She is heavily influenced by Reol, as stated in interviews with the Magic Rain and Netorabo, and is influenced by the Indonesian utaite community, the "Japanese sound" and Vocaloid culture. Not only in terms of "Japanese songs", she is also able to convey the feelings and emotions in different languages. Rainych has incorporated K-pop elements into her vocals and visual style, sang a cover of a Mandarin song, and sang a traditional Indonesian song in a livestream.

== Personal life ==
Rainych speaks English and Indonesian, along with several Indonesian regional languages, such as Minangkabau. Throughout her career, information regarding her personal life remained elusive and was not readily available to the public. In several interviews and a livestream, Rainych has stated that she keeps her personal life private. In an interview with Withnews and J-Wave News, Rainych makes a serious effort to protect her privacy by not revealing any details about where she currently lives.

Although her YouTube videos have attracted a lot of worldwide attention, she has not fully disclosed her activities to anyone except her family and immediate neighbors. In an interview with NNA ASIA, it was revealed that due to restrictions stemming from the COVID-19 pandemic, Rainych has spent most of her time at home without going out.

== Other ventures ==
=== Sponsorships ===
Rainych has been sponsored by miHoYo and Riot Games in relation to the video games Honkai Impact 3 and League of Legends.

=== Appearances in other media ===
In addition to performing on her own YouTube channel. Rainych has also made appearances on other YouTube channels and other websites, and has often collaborated with international artists; for instance, in May 2020, she participated in an online collaboration project with overseas YouTube creators, titled "Gurenge – Demon Slayer (Opening)｜Band Cover".

During 2020–2022, Rainych became a source of news not only on numerous Japanese television networks (TBS, NHK, Fuji TV, Kansai TV and Nippon TV), but also on various Japanese radio stations.

== Critical reception ==
As a singer and YouTuber, Rainych has been hailed as a prominent figure with notable receptions. In 2020, Miki Matsubara's "Mayonaka no Door" (1979) peaked on the Spotify Global Viral Chart for 15 consecutive days, and reached the top ranking on Apple's J-pop music chart in 12 countries, triggered by the release of Rainych's cover in October that year, and the cover being featured as TikTok's BGM. Since its initial publication in October 2020, her cover video has garnered more than 7 million views. Kazunari Imai of Pony Canyon remarked that this was a "classical synergistic hit" when "Mayonaka no Door" became one of the most iconic events in music streaming history.

== Discography ==
=== Extended plays ===
List of EPs, with release date and label shown
Title	Details
"Mayonaka no Door – Stay With Me – / BLIND CURVE"	Released: 26 May 2021; Label: Great Tracks / Sony Music; Formats: Analog record format (7-Inch Vinyl); Color: Clear Pink
"RIDE ON TIME / Say So -Japanese Version- (tofubeats Remix)"	Released: 28 August 2021; Label: Great Tracks / Sony Music; Formats: Analog record format (7-Inch Vinyl); Color: Aqua Blue

=== Singles ===
==== As lead artist ====
Title	Year	Peak chart positions		Label
Title	Year	JP	US	Label
"Kawaki wo Ameku (From Domestic na Kanojo)"	2019	—	—	Self-released single
"Again (From Fullmetal Alchemist: Brotherhood)" (feat. MattyyyM)	2019	—	—	Self-released single
"Time-Lapse"	2019	—	—	Sprite:Wall
"Tiny Little Adiantum – Omae wa Mou"	2020	—	—	Self-released single
"Black Catcher (From Black Clover)" (feat. MattyyyM)	2020	—	—	Self-released single
"Say So (Japanese Version)"	2020	—	17	Self-released single
"Summertime"	2020	—	—	Self-released single
"Renai Circulation"	2020	—	—	Self-released single
"Crossing Field (From Sword Art Online)" (feat. Saii)	2020	—	—	Self-released single
"Yoru ni Kakeru" (feat. A V I A N D)	2020	—	—	Self-released single
"LIFE (From Bleach Ending)" (feat. Saii)	2020	—	—	Self-released single
"Blinding Lights (Japanese Version)"	2020	—	—	Self-released single
"Pink Lemonade (Indonesian Version)"	2020	—	—	Sacra Music / Sony Music
"Mayonaka no Door / STAY WITH ME"	2020	49 (Note: Vinyl release in 2021, bundled with "Blind Curve")	—	Sony Music Japan
"The Baddest (From League of Legends)"	2020	—	—	Self-released single
"Blind Curve"	2020	—	—	Sony Music Japan
"Homura (From Kimetsu No Yaiba the Movie: Mugen Train)" (feat. A V I A N D)	2020	—	—	Self-released single
"Kaikai Kitan (From Jujutsu Kaisen)"	2021	—	—	Self-released single
"Diamond City"	2021	—	—	Sprite:Wall
"Ride On Time" (with Evening Cinema)	2021	—	—	Sony Music Japan
"Hakujitsu" (feat. Kururu)	2021	—	—	Self-released single
"Kaibutsu" (feat. A V I A N D)	2021	—	—	Self-released single
"Kiss Me More (Japanese Version)"	2021	—	—	Self-released single
"Cry Baby (From Tokyo Revengers)"	2021	—	—	Self-released single
"No"	2021	—	—	Sprite:Wall
"Haru wo Tsugeru"	2021	—	—	Self-released single
"Nyanpasu"	2021	—	—	Self-released single
"热爱105°C的你 / Super Idol"	2021	—	—	Self-released single
"Kanashimi Wo Yasashisa Ni (From Naruto)"	2022	—	—	Self-released single
"Signal (From 91 Days)"	2022	—	—	Self-released single
"Zankyou Sanka (From Demon Slayer: Kimetsu no Yaiba Season 2)"	2022	—	—	Self-released single
"Chiki Chiki Ban Ban"	2022	—	—	Self-released single
"See Tình"	2022	—	—	Self-released single
"See Tình (Japanese Version)"	2022	—	—	Self-released single
"Kick Back (From Chainsaw Man)"	2023	—	—	Self-released single
"Overdose"	2023	—	—	Self-released single
"Kawaikute Gomen"	2023	—	—	Self-released single
"Idol (From Oshi no Ko)"	2023	—	—	Self-released single

==== As featured artist ====
Title	Year	Artist	Label
"Uchiage Hanabi (KenForce Remix) (feat. Rainych & Kururu)"	2018	KenForce	Self-released single
"99.9 (From Mob Psycho 100)"	2019	Shayne Orok	Self-released single
"Kiss Me (From Carole & Tuesday)"	2019	ShiroNeko	Self-released single
"MattyyyM, Rainych, Shayne Orok, Fonzi M, 桿子Drumstick & Rufus Mann – Gurenge (Band Cover)"	2020	MattyyyM	Self-released single
"Haruka Mirai (From Black Clover) (Remix)"	2020	JacksonTC	Self-released single
"Chikatto Chika Chika (From Kaguya-sama: Love Is War)"	2020	ShiroNeko	Self-released single
"PolkaPets"	2021	PelleK	PelleK Music
"Rise Above (feat. Rainych)"	2021	Jaiden Animations	Jaiden Music
"Bury Me"	2021	SFINX	Glow Records
"Leave The Door Open"	2021	djalto	Self-released single
"Sweet Soul Revue (duet with Rainych) (feat. Evening Cinema)"	2022	Maki Nomiya	Victor Entertainment
"disco light (feat. Rainych)"	2022	Shibayan	Sprite:Wall
"September (Japanese Version) · Caitlin Myers · Rainych · Rachie"	2022	Caitlin Myers	Self-released single
"Rise Above (feat. Rainych & Illberg) (English Version)"	2022	Jaiden Animations · Rainych · Illberg	Glo Records
"Rise Above (feat. Rainych & Illberg) (Japanese Version)"	2022	Jaiden Animations · Rainych · Illberg	Glo Records

==== Remixes ====
Title	Year	Artist	Label
"Say So (Japanese Version)" (Tofubeats Remix)	2020	Rainych · Tofubeats	Sony Music Japan
"Bury Me" (Sana Remix)	2022	SFINX · Rainych · Sana	Siren (Under Exclusive License To Madison Records)
