= Judge (manga) =

1987-1991 manga series

- North America DVD Cover

ジャッジ (Jajji)
- Manga
- Written by: Fujihiko Hosono
- Published by: Futabasha
- Magazine: Action Brother; Comic Action Character
- Original run: 1987 – 1991
- Volumes: 2
- Original video animation

Magistrate of Darkness: Judge
- Directed by: Hiroshi Negishi
- Studio: Animate Film; J.C.Staff
- Licensed by: NA: Central Park Media; AUS / UK: Manga Entertainment
- Released: June 15, 1991
- Runtime: 48 minutes

Judge (Japanese: ジャッジ, Hepburn: Jajji) is a manga series written and illustrated by Fujihiko Hosono, published in Futabasha's Action Brother and Comic Action Character. The story focuses on the Japanese hell, where judgment is passed on the living.

An original video animation, Magistrate of Darkness: Judge, based on the manga was released in 1991.

== Plot ==
The OVA starts with a man being shot in a jungle-like scenery. It is later revealed that the person is Yamanobe, the vice-president of a company who sent him to South America, where he was killed by local guerrillas. The company he works for is the main center of the story and it is where all other major characters work. The main character, Hoichiro Oma (逢魔 法一郎), is apparently an everyman, known as a silent guy by his workmates. However, in secret, he is the Judge of Darkness, punishing living criminals that were not found guilty by human laws.

Two of Oma's workmates, Ryuichi Murakami and Koji Kawamata, are embezzling money from the company. To do it, Murakami seduced Yamamoto, a woman who works in the company accounting department. When an investigation about the case starts and a rumor that Yamamoto is the culprit starts to be spread, Yamamato is found hung in a rope. The police consider it as a suicide, but Oma, as the Judge of the Darkness, appears before Murakami and charges him for Yamamoto's murder.

After killing Murakami, Oma starts to chase Kawamata, and he first makes a call simulating Yamanobe's voice. Soon after, a mysterious man, who proclaims himself to be a lawyer, appears before Kawamata. The man says Kawamata will need his help and puts a seal on Kawamata's hand right before Kawamata dispenses his aid. However, when Kawamata is caught in an Oma's trap and the seal saves him, he goes to contact the "Metaphysical Lawyer". The lawyer explains the dead can have a grudge against the living people. To resolve this problem, he goes with Kawamata to the mountains, where the lawyer fights with Oma and defeats the Judge of Darkness.

However, through his girlfriend, Nanase, Oma evokes Datsue-ba to summon the Court of Ten Kings—the ultimate court of the hell. Although Oma cannot prove Kawamata to be the culprit even by calling Yamanobe's soul, the guilty Kawamata ends up stumbling on Enma's mirror. The artifact reveals Kawamata had a secret discretionary fund in South America that controlled the guerillas who killed Yamanobe. Kawamata is ultimately strangled by his own reflection in the hell and is found dead in his office by Nanase.

== Media ==
=== Manga ===
The manga by Fujihiko Hosono was initially published in Action Brother by Futabasha between 1987 and 1989, when it was transferred to another magazine by the same publisher, Comic Action Character. The first chapter was published on November 13, 1987, while the last one was published on March 22, 1991. Its chapters were encapsulated into two tankōbon volumes published in January 1990 and August 1981 respectively. Futabasha would further republish the series into two volumes in April 2000.

=== OVA ===
Under the title of Magistrate of Darkness: Judge (闇の司法官 ジャッジ, Yami no Shihosha Jajji), an original video animation (OVA) adapted the first chapter of the first volume of the manga. It ran theatrically on June 15, 1991, and was released in VHS on August 1, 1991. Central Park Media (CPM) licensed it for a North American audience, and first released a VHS on October 8, 1996, in subtitled and dubbed versions. The subtitled version was broadcast by Independent Film Channel in April 1997, and it was released on DVD on March 16, 1999. By 2007, the DVD publication was discontinued and after CPM's bankruptcy in 2009 its license was liquidated.

== Reception ==
Michael Toole of Anime News Network said he "just love[d] Judge", although he considered it "a particularly low-budget OVA catering to bored salarymen". Toole called it a "crude albeit satisfying revenge fantasy" that "fits in nicely with a viewing of Harvey Birdman episodes". A reviewer for Video Watchdog declared: "Highly competent animation and an engrossing story by Fujihiko Hosono make JUDGE a very worthwhile entertainment." Fred Patten wrote for Cartoon Research that it was "better directed than most" under-an-hour OVAs, especially praising its "clever dialogue". On the other hand, Carlos Ross of THEM Anime Reviews dubbed it "an unmemorable OAV"; he wrote, "Judge should have been an interesting, if strange trip through a suspenseful world of intrigue. Instead, it is a mostly incoherent mash of the creepy, with a jumbled plot and unconvincing acting".
