= Dirty Pair Flash =

Japanese original video animation series

- Cover for the Region 1 DVD release by ADV Films

ダーティペア FLASH(フラッシュ) (Dāti Pea Furasshu)
- Created by: Haruka Takachiho
- Original video animation

Dirty Pair Flash: Mission I
- Directed by: Tsukasa Sunaga
- Produced by: Eiji Sashida; Hiroshi Hirayama; Masato Terada
- Written by: Hisashi Tokimura
- Music by: Kei Wakakusa
- Studio: Sunrise
- Licensed by: NA: Crunchyroll
- Released: January 21, 1994 – June 23, 1994
- Episodes: 6
- Original video animation

Dirty Pair Flash: Mission II
- Directed by: Tomomi Mochizuki
- Produced by: Eiji Sashida; Hiroshi Hirayama; Toru Hasegawa
- Written by: Fuyunori Gobu
- Music by: Jun'ichi Kanezaki; Hajime Mizoguchi
- Studio: Sunrise
- Licensed by: NA: Crunchyroll
- Released: June 1, 1995 – October 1, 1995
- Episodes: 5
- Original video animation

Dirty Pair Flash: Mission III
- Directed by: Tomomi Mochizuki
- Produced by: Eiji Sashida; Hiroshi Hirayama; Toru Hasegawa
- Written by: Fuyunori Gobu
- Music by: Junko Miyagi
- Studio: Sunrise
- Licensed by: NA: Crunchyroll
- Released: December 21, 1995 – April 25, 1996
- Episodes: 5
- Novel series
- Written by: Haruka Takachiho
- Illustrated by: Rulia 046
- Published by: Hayakawa Publishing
- Imprint: Hayakawa Bunko JA
- Original run: December 1994 – September 1999
- Volumes: 3
- Manga
- Written by: Hisato Makihara
- Published by: MediaWorks
- Imprint: Dengeki Comics
- Magazine: Dengeki G's Magazine
- Original run: July 1995 – January 1996
- Volumes: 1
- Manga

Dirty Pair Flash DX
- Written by: Takemaru Ōno
- Published by: MediaWorks
- Imprint: Dengeki Comics
- Magazine: Dengeki G's Magazine
- Original run: March 1996 – July 1996
- Volumes: 1

Dirty Pair Flash (ダーティペア FLASH(フラッシュ), Dāti Pea Furasshu) is a Japanese original video animation series produced by Sunrise, based on the light novel series Dirty Pair by Haruka Takachiho.

When Sunrise originally began the project, their idea was to make a sequel to the original Dirty Pair series, but Kyōko Tongū, the original voice actress for Kei, had long retired and moved to North America, and Saeko Shimazu, the voice of Yuri, refused to work with anyone but her original partner, forcing the project to be a remake of the original series instead.

Dirty Pair Flash was first aired in North America on PBS San Jose station Superstation KTEH as the English-subtitled version and also on Showtime’s SHO Beyond channel as the English-dubbed version. The English version of Dirty Pair Flash was licensed by ADV Films.

== Plot summary ==
Compared to the wealthy and affluent world of the original Dirty Pair, Flash takes place in a universal human civilization where mankind is recovering from a major galactic economic crash which then spurred an intense decade of wars and conflicts before the setting's current era of stable if rather uneasy peace. In a somewhat more down to earth if cynical backdrop, mankind continues on its leaps and bounds of technological and scientific progress despite economic struggles and recoveries throughout the galaxy. Many remnants and reminders of the economic crash still remain throughout.

Kei and Yuri were originally junior auxiliary agents in the Worlds Works and Welfare Agency (W.W.W.A. or 3WA for short) when the two were paired together under the codename "Lovely Angels." Kei was coming off her fourth probation for something she had done, and Yuri's dating exploits were common knowledge, not to mention the two had an instant dislike for each other when they met. Unlike the original pair, the two suffer from both the struggles of everyday working life and their own human faults; Kei is hotheaded and headstrong, Yuri is capricious and passive, and both share many things in common than they would like to admit: both come from backwater colonies and outpost worlds, both only have their jobs presumably as merely a headway in their yearning for something more in life, and both barely passed 3WA's academic and training screenings, despite holding one of 3WA's most renowned positions as 3WA's historically famous namesake Trouble Consultants.

Kei and Yuri were not the first to receive the codename Lovely Angels. Years before, during the Gamorian Riots, two other women, Iris and Molly, had been given the designation Lovely Angels. Molly was killed in action, and her partner Iris, who had lost her left arm trying to save Molly, became bitter about the lack of response from the 3WA and vanished, later becoming the notorious assassin known as "Lady Freya."

At first, Kei and Yuri refused to work with each other, and Kei even resigned from the 3WA. However, when the "Siren" crisis erupted, Kei returned. This was decidedly a good thing, as Yuri's ditsy new partner, Lily, had abruptly quit just as the response to the crisis started, and Kei's return came just in time, as Yuri was about to be killed by Waldess.

Afterwards, the two continued to work together, although they earned their nickname, "the Dirty Pair" because of all the collateral damage the two (unintentionally) cause in the completion of their cases. And even though the two now get along with one another, they continue to bicker and complain to each other.

In addition to the sixteen anime episodes, there have been three novels (1994, 1997, 1999) and four "Stereo Dramas" (one in 1994, the others in 1996) written by Takachiho, as well as two sanctioned manga series (1995–96) published by Dengeki Comics.

== Characters ==
=== Kei ===
Born: January 1, 2231, Age 17 on the colony planet Workoh, Kei is hot-headed, impulsive, and rude; often called a tomboy. Her usual response to a crisis is "shoot first and ask questions later.", but she can show insight into situations when properly motivated. She usually gets into a lot of arguments with Yuri over her "girly" attitude, but is usually the first in line to back her up when trouble happens. Kei is also very Proficient with a Blaster and uses one as her primary weapon.
Kei has a love for jet coasters, fast-food restaurants, drinking beer, sushi, and big-game fishing. She is afraid of nothing with the exception of ghosts, zombies, and vampires. Kei has a softer side, but dislikes showing it.

Voiced by: Rica Matsumoto (Japanese); Sue Ulu (English)

=== Yuri ===
Born: March 3, 2231, Age 17 on the colony world Shack-G, Yuri acts more stereotypically feminine than Kei. She is more concerned with getting dates and marrying a rich, handsome man than doing her job, and she gets more than her share of complaints from Kei because of this. However, if anyone ever harms her partner, it's unlikely that the offender will live to tell about it. Yuri is adept at using a plasma sword and carries one as her primary weapon.
Yuri is the more romantic of the two. She likes romantic dinners, moonlit walks, and very wealthy men. However, she has poor luck with men, as she usually finds men who care more about what their fathers think about what happens to their prized possessions than to her.

Voiced by: Mariko Kouda (Japanese); Kim Sevier (English)

=== Secondary characters ===
Chief Garner
Garner was a section chief in the 3WA at the beginning of the series. A veteran of the Gamorian Riots, he was instrumental in helping to rebuild the 3WA in the aftermath. Now approaching retirement, he has the unenviable task of molding two bickering junior auxiliary agents, Kei and Yuri, into first-class trouble consultants.

Garner was also a good friend of the original Lovely Angels, Iris and Molly, and it troubles him that Kei and Yuri were given the 'Lovely Angels' codename by the 3WA's central mainframe. He knows of the trouble the two got into previously, and fears that they will bring shame to that honored name.
Voiced by: Hajime Koseki (Japanese); Rick Peeples (English)

Chief Poporo
Chief Poporo became section chief supervising the Lovely Angels after Garner's retirement. He was once a trouble consultant himself, requiring a cybernetic arm after participating in the arrest of renegade weapons designer Berringer.

While he realizes Kei and Yuri's usefulness, he is irritated by all the damage they cause. He seems to be quite the henpecked husband; he often gets calls from his wife back home, asking him to go grocery shopping after work.
Voiced by: Shigezō Sasaoka (Japanese); Don'l Johnson (English)

Lady Freya
Originally, she was known as Iris, one of the original Lovely Angels. She, along with her partner Molly, were the finest trouble consultant team in the history of the 3WA. However, during the Gamorian Riots, the two were faced with a huge crisis during which Molly died and Iris lost her left arm.

Now known as Lady Freya, Iris led the life of an assassin-for-hire. She had briefly aided Waldess as he tried to take control of the galaxy, but was double-crossed by him. She also looks down at the newest team who were given the codename "Lovely Angels," Kei and Yuri.
During the 'Siren' crisis, Freya was reunited with her old friend Garner, who revealed what had happened when Molly was killed. Guilt-stricken, Iris confronted the cause of the crisis, Waldess, and tried to arrest him, but was killed in the process.

After the crisis was over, Iris' record as Lady Freya was expunged and Iris was posthumously awarded the 3WA's highest honors.
In the flashbacks, Iris and Molly's appearances are identical to the original designs of Kei and Yuri respectively.

Voiced by: Yumi Tōma (Japanese); Laura Chapman (English)
Touma

Touma was a character in the second series. He is a trouble consultant just like Kei and Yuri, but his speciality is computers and computer programs. He looks like your average computer geek; he wears eyeglasses, and has a tall but wiry body. In the course of thinking, Touma also gets distracted by the smallest of details - which often gets him beat up by Kei and Yuri. He is also inexperienced with dating, which led to one of the most hilarious moments in the series.
Touma's knowledge in computers is almost unmatched. As a college student, he was the one who had written the code to Silica 2000, Worlds World's chief mainframe... and got an "A" for his efforts. When Silica 2000 was compromised by a computer virus, Touma was called upon to eradicate it. However, since Touma is also a target by the creator of the virus, Kei and Yuri went with him as well, and stayed on the planet when Touma began to isolate the computer from the creator... a Joint Artificial Intelligence Criminal, or J.A.I.C.

Voiced by: Kenichi Ono (Japanese); Jason Douglas (English)
Calbee

Calbee is a con-artist who ended up stranded on Worlds World when the J.A.I.C. infected Silica 2000, and later when the Lovely Angels wrecked Narita Spaceport when landing on the planet. An expert in persuasion, he swindles many a lovely girl and takes off with their money.
On the day an unexpected typhoon blows into Tokyo, he was charming another woman at an all-you-can-eat restaurant by relating a story that he was a Tro-Con, when he encountered Kei and Yuri, who had cancelled their reservations at a very pricey French restaurant. Kei had recognized Calbee because she was a victim of his and saw a chance to get the money she and Yuri needed for the restaurant.

What followed next was a pursuit, which resulted in the three ending up stranded miles away from Tokyo and having to walk back on foot. Calbee tried many times to escape, either by guile or by action, but for one reason or another, it all went wrong. In the end, Calbee was brought in, but somehow escaped to do his cons again. Kei and Yuri saw this, but decided not to pursue him again.
Voiced by: Akio Ootsuka (Japanese); Spike Spencer (English)

Leena
A florist on Worlds World, Leena had caught the eye of Touma when he and Yuri were caught on one of the planet's planned rainy days. From the time he set eyes on her, Touma was smitten with her. However, for all the planning he made to woo her, there was one fact he didn't calculate on... Leena was a lesbian who had her eyes on Yuri.

Voiced by: Yuri Shiratori (Japanese); Kimberly Yates (English)
Gazelle

An arrogant, almost sadistic individual, Gazelle was enlisted by the 3WA to teach Kei and Yuri beach volleyball so that they could accomplish their latest mission; capture a corrupt president of a galactic company. In order to do this, Gazelle harshly drove Kei and Yuri to the point of total breakdown, and beyond that. He would do anything to whip the girls into shape, including outright lying; when Kei and Yuri chose to quit after his training reduced Yuri to tears, Gazelle told them how fifty men had suffered at the hands of the president, including his best friend. This gave the girls a renewed sense of duty, to which they resumed their training. On their last day, however, Kei and Yuri sent Gazelle to the hospital by knocking volleyballs primed to explode if touched by anything but their hands back at him.
After the tournament and subsequent arrest of the president, Kei and Yuri learned from Poporo that the fifty men Gazelle had mentioned hadn't died, but in fact suffered office-related injuries such as Carpel Tunnel Syndrome. They then went to Gazelle's hospital room in a fit of psychosis and proceeded to beat him up.

Voiced by: Kiyoshi Kobayashi (Japanese); Rob Mungle (English)
Monica De Noir

Coming from a long and honored line of assassins, Monica De Noir, a.k.a. the Sweet Fairy, is given the job of killing Kei and Yuri to celebrate her 15th birthday. Her weapons usually include explosive candy, killer teddy bears, and other cute but deadly items. She also has at her disposal a battle mecha in the form of a teddy bear.
Voiced by: Mika Kanai (Japanese); Junie Hoang (English)

Julian
The grandson of the 3WA's biggest contributors, Julian is a brilliant but lonely boy who is obsessed with Yuri... so much so that he uses his genius to gather as much information about her as he can, including her likes and dislikes, and constructs an android double of the trouble consultant so that he can be with her.

However, when Kei accidentally breaks the Yuri android, the real Yuri then steps in place until Julian can repair the android. She then lived in what was a life-sized dollhouse, which included an extensive wardrobe. Yuri had to somehow let the boy know that what he was in love with was a doll and not a real person... which ultimately proved to be her undoing at the end of the story, for Julian fell in love with a girl who had been trying to get through to him but he was too obsessed with the android Yuri at the time.
Voiced by: Hekiru Shiina (Japanese); David Bell (English)

Lily
Lily was Yuri's temporary partner, who was assigned to her when Kei had quit the 3WA for a brief time. Her personality seems to mirror Yuri's, but even more to the extreme, to the point of appearing as the stereotypical dumb blonde. During her first mission, Lily attempted to use one of Yuri's known tactics to get out of the mission, only to be scolded by Yuri herself and ruined a stakeout. When the 'Siren' crisis erupted, Lily abruptly quit the 3WA, mostly due to the stress of being a trouble consultant.

Lily was last seen at the end of Mission One, when she was sighted by Kei and Yuri riding in a car with a handsome man.
Voiced by: Katsuyo Endou (Japanese); Allison Keith (English)

Mughi
Mughi is Kei and Yuri's pet cat, found on their first adventure. Mughi is usually left in the care of Chief Poporo, as Yuri is too busy as a trouble consultant or dating.

Rosa
Rosa is Chief Poporo's daughter from a previous marriage. While her father would be annoyed about having to care for Mughi, Rosa found the cat entertaining and would often play with him when she visited 3WA Headquarters. It was during one of these visits that Berringer attacked and used the girl to try to get to Poporo.

Voiced by: Kimberly Yates

== Episode list ==
=== Dirty Pair Flash (1994) ===
- Opening song: Limitless Answers" by MANA.
- Ending song: "The Second Chapter" by MANA.

| No. in series | No. in season | Title | Original release date | Description |
|---|---|---|---|---|
| 1 | 1 | Runaway Angel | January 21, 1994 | Yuri is in town all dressed up for a date when a dying agent from the 3WA (World, Welfare, and Works Agency) hands her a special card to give to headquarters. As Kei crosses paths with her, one thing is only certain- It is going to be a very long night for these two! |
| 2 | 2 | Darkside Angel | February 21, 1994 | On a crucial mission, Kei and Yuri are at a spaceport, escorting a weapons engineer and a scientist to safety, but despite all preordained security measures, both of the charges are shot and killed. The girls pursue the assassin, who turns out to be a beautiful but very skilled woman named Lady Flair. |
| 3 | 3 | Frozen Angel | March 22, 1994 | After spotting bigwig Waldess at his GCN corporation, Kei tries to confront him but the bodyguards apprehend her and toss her out. Frustrated, Kei has had enough, and resigns. Yuri is assigned to protect a neuroscientist, but runs into trouble as Lady Flair storms in to kill the scientist. Waldess takes a sabbatical to a cruiser ship on a planet's ocean full of deadly whirlpools. Kei pursues her but gets into trouble as Lady Flair is aboard the ship, and Yuri pursues to try to help out. |
| 4 | 4 | Sleeping Angel | April 21, 1994 | Professor Kupps has made it to 3WA headquarters but he has hidden himself mind-wise in a virtual reality role-playing world of his own creation. It'll be up to Yuri to go in there and save him. Kei leaves headquarters but notices the blue uniformed men from the first episode on the subway, and they are plotting to attack 3WA and kill Kupps. As Yuri enters a stronghold and fights fantasy monsters in the virtual realm, Kei gets dragged into 3WA headquarters. |
| 5 | 5 | Stray Angel | May 24, 1994 | With Kaps's testimony, the GCN is being investigated. The guys that represent Lucifer decide that Waldess is too dangerous especially when he's still going after Siren, so they hire an assassin, who is none other than Lady Flair! Kei gets her gun repaired but it got confiscated by the 3WA. Meanwhile, Yuri gets a new ditzy partner named Lilly, and they have to help Unit 9 stake out Waldess at a spaceport, but trouble arises when other assassins make their moves against Waldess. |
| 6 | 6 | Lovely Angel | June 23, 1994 | With Waldess on the run from the authorities, he begins a desperate move- To become the ruler of a new age! But with Yuri without a partner, Lady Flair still on the move, and Kei on her own, will all things come together? Or will it all come to an end? |

=== Dirty Pair Flash 2 (1995) ===
- Opening song: "Loving In The Thrill" by Rica Matsumoto.
- Ending song: "I Really Like You" by Mariko Kouda.

| No. in series | No. in season | Title | Original release date | Description |
|---|---|---|---|---|
| 7 | 1 | Tokyo Holiday Network | June 1, 1995 | On World's World, a recently started amusement resort getaway planet dedicated to faithfully reenacting mankind's former civilizations, trouble has been had with its managing supercomputer, the Silica 2000. Along with W3A computer expert Touma, Kei and Yuri accompany him to check out if its malfunctions are merely bugs in the system, or something more sinister. |
| 8 | 2 | Mysterious High School Seventeen | July 1, 1995 | After a recent scuffle with Touma's would-be assailant, the destruction of the team's hotel luxury suites have dashed both their hopes of an impromptu vacation and a complete getaway from the Trouble Consultant world. But with Touma's help, he deduces that not all accommodations have been accounted for. Little do they know, they may have to relive their school days, again, in reenacted Tokyo's private schooling system. |
| 9 | 3 | Steamy Hotsprings Romantic Tour | August 2, 1995 | On their pay, Kei and Yuri unfortunately must pass on eating out at one of World's World's top class French restaurants. At the alternative of an affordable cafeteria, across from them, lounges about Calbee, one of the galaxy's biggest con men. Hoping to capture his bounty to eat like royalty, a sabotaged helicopter ride sends them crashing into the outskirts of World World's Tokyo and into the alien wilderness. To survive and ensure their labors aren't wasted, Kei and Yuri must travel back on foot and avoid deadly wildlife, the harsh elements, and even Calbee's swindling sweet talk to make it back to civilization. |
| 10 | 4 | Sparkling Flower Shop of Love | September 1, 1995 | On a rainy day, Touma and Yuri get caught on one of World World's rainiest days. But as they stand under the shelter of a corner flower shop, the young woman inside offers them both umbrellas to lend to make it back to their lodgings. Though just a kind gesture by a good citizen, Touma apparently has become smitten by this young woman at the flower shop. Will his romantic crush blossom into something greater? |
| 11 | 5 | Tokyo Airport Hot Pursuit | October 1, 1995 | On World's World's grand reopening upon the complete repair of its spaceport, suspiciously, the unmanned space freighter Space Horse cannot be deterred from World's World's gravitational orbit, lest its sensitive cargo of PWN- a highly powerful terraforming explosive- will cost the resort more than its recent delays. Meanwhile, increased and frequent attempts on Touma's life have revealed that the same thing that infested Silica 2000- a sentient AI known as a J.A.I.C.- is producing stealth androids in attempts to both do away with witnesses and try to leave the network lockdown on World's World into the universal network. Kei and Yuri's last day on World's World will either have these things come head to head, or a permanent vacation. |

=== Dirty Pair Flash 3 (1995–96) ===
- Opening song: "Don't Get Serious" by Mariko Kouda.
- Ending song: "Looking With The Eyes Of The Heart" by Rica Matsumoto

| No. in series | No. in season | Title | Original release date | Description |
|---|---|---|---|---|
| 12 | 1 | Snow White Chaser | December 21, 1995 | Making their way home after the World's World fiasco, Kei's flight home becomes a disastrous incident, leaving only her and a male newborn alive as the only survivors. Kei and the baby must find their way to civilization from the snowy alpines, while Yuri must figure out for herself the mystery of Kei's late absence, including why the hijackers of the plane wanted no survivors. |
| 13 | 2 | Pink Sniper | February 1, 1996 | A young rising and bloodthirsty starlet of the criminal underworld, Monica De Noir, aims to make her mark by targeting the famous and infamous Lovely Angels. |
| 14 | 3 | The Winners in Summer Colors | March 1, 1996 | The Lovely Angels must participate in one of their most intense missions yet: an intense athletic workout regime under W3A's coach Gazelle, to become some of galactic volleyball's greatest star players. With over 50 W3A agents having fallen before them to attempt this mission, winning the Galactic Lady's Volleyball Tournament is the only way to capture one of the most wanted men in the universe. |
| 15 | 4 | My Boy in Rose Color | April 1, 1996 | When Kei breaks a teenage boy's replica of Yuri by accident, the real Yuri must stand in to ensure the continued sponsorship of one of W3A's biggest financial benefactors. |
| 16 | 5 | The Gray Avenger | April 25, 1996 | In this impromptu grand finale, some of the galaxy's worst criminals have come together: Public enemy number 2, the illegal arms designer and terrorist Berringer, and public enemy number one, criminal despot Mad Dog. Berringer offers to Mad Dog the period of 100 hours, for the purpose of settling the score with 3WA Section Chief, Poporo, with a powerful and dangerous prototype mobile armor weapon of his own diabolical reunited creation. Making a large scale attack on 3WA Headquarters, it is going to take everything they've got and some big firepower for the Lovely Angels to take the scum of the universe down! |

== Reception ==
Mike Crandol of Anime News Network said in a review of Mission II that Kei and Yuri in this series "manage to entertain in their own way," praised the animation as "incredibly polished," and the musical score as well-done. Even so, he criticized these two protagonists for having an inadequate redesign, saying both have become "stereotypes of their former selves," and said that the voices of the characters leaves "something to be desired."
