= Dirty Pair: Project Eden =

1986 Japanese anime film by Kōichi Mashimo

- North American poster art
- Directed by: Kōichi Mashimo
- Written by: Hiroyuki Hoshiyama
- Based on: Dirty Pair by Haruka Takachiho
- Produced by: Hironori Nakagawa; Masanori Ito; Yoshihide Kondo
- Starring: Kyouko Tonguu; Saeko Shimazu; Katsuji Mori; Naoki Makishima; Chikao Ohtsuka; Toku Nishio
- Cinematography: Atsushi Okui
- Edited by: Fumihiro Isobe; Satoru Ishida; Shuichi Kakesu
- Music by: Kenzou Shiguma
- Production company: Nippon Sunrise
- Distributed by: Shochiku
- Release date: November 28, 1986
- Running time: 85 minutes
- Country: Japan
- Language: Japanese

Dirty Pair: Project Eden, known in Japan as Dirty Pair: The Movie (ダーティペア劇場版, Daati Pea Gekijou-ban), is a 1986 Japanese science fiction action anime film directed by Kōichi Mashimo and animated by Nippon Sunrise. The film is part of the Dirty Pair anime series, and follows protagonists Kei and Yuri as they investigate bizarre attacks on Vizorium plants on the planet Agerna. The film was originally released in Japan on November 28, 1986, and was later licensed for release in North America in 1994 by Streamline Pictures. It was later redubbed and released on DVD on November 9, 2003, by ADV Films.

== Plot ==
After stopping a group of smugglers at a resort, 3WA Trouble Consultants Kei and Yuri are sent on a mission to Agerna, a planet rich with Vizorium - a mineral necessary for space travel. They are sent to investigate the mysterious attacks on Vizorium plants that have put the nations of Edia and Uldas on a war footing.

While the pair take baths inside a washroom of a derelict Vizorium plant during an investigation, Carson D. Carson, a member of the group of smugglers they stopped on their last mission, interrupts their baths by falling through a vent. Kei and Yuri arrest Carson for questioning, but are then ambushed by a large group of strange alien monsters that force them to flee, leaving their equipment behind and wearing nothing but towels.

After learning the truth behind the Vizorium plant attacks from Carson, Kei and Yuri reluctantly ally with him to stop the true culprit behind the attacks - Professor Wattsman, a mad scientist bent on taking a long dormant alien race, the Sadinga, to its final evolutionary form as part of an experiment called Project Eden. The group locates Wattsman’s compound, and sneak in to investigate. After spending some time investigating the lab, Kei and Carson are captured by Wattsman, forcing Yuri to go into hiding to avoid detection. Wattsman then takes DNA samples from both Kei and Carson to use for Project Eden. After regaining consciousness, Carson reveals to Kei that his true objective is to obtain a rare World War II-era vintage wine from 1945 called General de Gaulle, which is worth around 60 million credits. Carson initially came into possession of the wine during a heist, but while he was escaping from the authorities he was mugged by Wattsman’s assistant Bruno, who stole the wine from him.

Minutes later, the Lovely Angel mothership, piloted by Mughi, launches an attack on Wattsman’s lab which frees Kei and Carson. Kei, Yuri, and Carson then equip themselves with armor and weapons Mughi airdropped to them, and do battle with Wattsman, Bruno, and the Sadingas. Kei and Yuri wipe out most of the Sadingas, while Carson fights Bruno for the wine. Though Carson finally manages to obtain the wine, he then suffers a severe stab wound from Bruno’s beam sword. A saddened Kei hands Carson the wine for him to drink, then he sacrifices himself to stop the last of the Sadingas. Kei and Yuri then go after Wattsman and Bruno, and finally arrest them after a long struggle, destroying Wattsman’s lab in the process.

Carson is revealed to have survived and rejoins Kei and Yuri as they head back to 3WA headquarters. However, Carson accidentally activates Wattsman's leftover equipment by throwing the empty bottle back down to the surface, which causes the Sadingas all over the planet to awaken and cause chaos.

== Voice cast ==
Character Name	Japanese	English (Streamline)	English (ADV)
Kei	Kyōko Tongū	Lara Cody	Pamela Lauer
Yuri	Saeko Shimazu	Wendee Lee	Allison Sumrall
Carson D. Carson	Katsuji Mori	Kerrigan Mahan	David Matranga
Dr. Wattsman	Chikao Ōtsuka	Steve Kramer	John Swasey
Chief Manager	Osamu Kobayashi	Eddie Frierson	George Manley
Supervisor	Mikio Terashima	Dan Woren	Jason Douglas
Bruno	Toku Nishio	Milton James	Brett Weaver
Crime Boss	Shōzō Iizuka	Kirk Thornton	Andy McAvin
Secretary	Kayoko Fujii	Juliana Donald	Monica Rial
Mughi	Naoki Makishima	Michael McConnohie	Brett Weaver
Goolley	Ikuya Sawaki		
Rita / Sandra	Kazue Komiya		

== Reception ==
Dirty Pair: Project Eden has received positive reviews, with some critics considering it to be superior to the original Dirty Pair television series.

Mike Crandol of Anime News Network states that "Dirty Pair: Project Eden is one of the few glorious exceptions ... it's not just bigger and louder, it actually is better. Rarely do all the elements come together so nicely, and even all these years later it's hard to think of any other anime that's simply as much fun as this movie". Rebecca Silverman of Anime News Network mentions on her review of the Dirty Pair Features Collection that among the three films this one was the "campiest with the least urgent storyline". She also states that the animation "has moments of beautiful fluidity, such as Yuri flopping in a tub of water, the dissolution of a floor beneath the characters' feet, or Yuri's impromptu dance number on a transport." Helen McCarthy in 500 Essential Anime Movies commented that the film can "stand the test of time" and that "this is a movie with lots to enjoy. Even the cheesy '80s pop soundtrack has its own guilty charm". Carlos Ross of THEM Anime Reviews gave Project Eden a rating of 4 out of 5 stars, deeming it to be the best entry in the entire Dirty Pair franchise, ultimately concluding that “it's intelligent and well crafted, with good animation for its day, good music, oh, and yeah, did we mention the *real* Kei and Yuri? If you want a purely *fun* movie, Project Eden fits the bill perfectly.”

== Music ==
- Opening Theme:
  - "Safari Eyes" by Miki Matsubara
- Insert song:
  - "Over the Top" by Miki Matsubara
- Ending Theme:
  - "pas de deux" by Miki Matsubara
