= Meiko Nakahara =

Japanese singer and composer

- 中原 めいこ
- From the cover of her single, Kowareta Piano/Destination, 1986
- Born: Meiko Obara (小原 明子); May 8, 1959 (age 67); Chiba Prefecture
- Occupations: Singer, composer
- Musical career
- Genres: New music, J-pop, City pop
- Instrument: Vocals
- Years active: 1982–1992

Meiko Obara (小原 明子, Obara Meiko), known publicly as Meiko Nakahara (中原 めいこ, Nakahara Meiko), (born May 8, 1959), is a Japanese former singer and composer. Active from 1982 to 1992, she was known for her music in the city pop genre. She also created the opening and closing songs for the Dirty Pair and Kimagure Orange Road anime television series.

== Early life and career ==
Meiko Obara was born on May 8, 1959, in Chiba Prefecture. She began composing music while in Junior High School.

She debuted in 1982 with the single Kon'ya dake Dance Dance Dance (今夜だけDANCE DANCE DANCE) and the album Coconuts House (ココナッツ・ハウス). Her 1984 single Kimitachi Kiwi Papaya Mango dane (君たちキウイ・パパイア・マンゴーだね。) was the 50th best-selling single of the year in Japan, with 237,000 copies sold. She became instantly popular.

Her song Ru-Ru-Ru-Russian Roulette (ロ・ロ・ロ・ロシアンルーレット) was the opening theme and Uchū Ren'ai (Space Fantasy) (宇宙恋愛(スペースファンタジー)) was the ending theme for the 1985 anime television series Dirty Pair. Ru-Ru-Ru-Russian Roulette won the award for Best Song at the 8th Anime Grand Prix in 1986. For the 1987–1988 anime television series Kimagure Orange Road, Kagami no Naka no Actress (鏡の中のアクトレス) was the third opening theme song and Dance in the Memories (ダンス・イン・ザ・メモリーズ) was the third ending song.

The 1992 live tour was the last public performance from her and her singing career is considered to have ended around this time.

== Later career and Legacy ==
After ceasing her singing career, Nakahara worked as a composer for groups and singers like Checkicco and Vivian Hsu. She has mostly faded out of public eye since 1992. A tribute band to her called Lotos was formed in 2010 and was still active as of 2019. In an article for Sankei Shimbun, Nakahara was recognized as a significant artist in the city pop genre.

== Discography ==
=== Albums ===
Release date	Title	Ref.
July 1, 1982	Coconuts House (ココナッツ・ハウス)	
December 21, 1982	2時までのシンデレラ-FRIDAY MAGIC-	
September 1, 1983	Mint (ミ・ン・ト)	
July 21, 1984	Lotos no Kajitsu (ロートスの果実-LOTOS)	
May 22, 1985	CHAKI CHAKI CLUB	
March 20, 1986	MOODS	
March 4, 1987	PUZZLE	
February 25, 1988	Kimagure Orange Road Sound Color 3 (きまぐれオレンジ・ロード Sound Color 3)	
March 5, 1988	Kagami no Naka no Actress (鏡の中のアクトレス)	
March 21, 1990	303 EAST 60TH STREET	
March 27, 1991	HIGH ENERGY-Remixed in N.Y.-	
October 30, 1991	ON THE PLANET-地球でのできごと-	

==== Greatest hits albums ====
Release date	Title	Ref.
September 3, 1986	MOGA-BEST COLLECTION-	
August 26, 1987	中原めいこ ニュー・ベストナウ	
May 25, 1988	Meiko's BEST SELECTION 10+1	
June 5, 1988	セレクション20/中原めいこバラッドI	
April 26, 1989	Happy birthday, Love for you	
May 13, 1998	中原めいこ/ツイン・ベスト	
June 21, 2000	2000 BEST 中原めいこ・ベスト	
November 17, 2004	Golden Best Nakahara Meiko (ゴールデン☆ベスト 中原めいこ)	
August 24, 2005	NEW BEST 1500	

=== Singles ===
Release date	Title	Ref.
April 21, 1982	"Kon'ya dake Dance Dance Dance" (今夜だけDANCE DANCE DANCE)	
September 21, 1982	"Go Away"	
March 21, 1983	"Friday Magic"	
July 21, 1983	"Tsukiyo ni Ki wo Tsukete!" (月夜に気をつけて!)	
November 21, 1983	"Scorpion" (スコーピオン)	
April 5, 1984	Kimi-tachi Kiwi・Papaiya・Mango da ne (君たちキウイ・パパイア・マンゴーだね)	
September 21, 1984	"Emoushon" (エモーション)	
May 1, 1985	"Yakimochi-yaki Rhumba Boy" (やきもちやきルンバ・ボーイ)	
July 21, 1985	"Ru-Ru-Ru-Russian Roulette" (ロ・ロ・ロ・ロシアンルーレット)	
February 1, 1986	"Kowareta Piano" / "DESTINATION" (こわれたピアノ / DESTINATION)	
February 4, 1987	"UNBALANCE ZONE"	
February 2, 1988	"Special Party Versions" (スペシャル・パーティ・バージョン)	
February 25, 1988	"Kagami no Naka no Actress" (鏡の中のアクトレス)	
February 21, 1990	DAIYAMONDO Miwakenasai -Is it true love- (ダイヤモンド見分けなさい-Is it true love-)	
September 27, 1991	"Fortune -gin no tsukiyo no HANEMUUN-" (Fortune -銀の月夜のハネムーン-)	
