= Gu Gu Ganmo =

Japanese manga series

- Manga volume 1 cover

Gu-Guガンモ
- Manga
- Written by: Fujihiko Hosono
- Published by: Shogakukan
- Imprint: Shōnen Sunday Comics
- Magazine: Weekly Shōnen Sunday
- Original run: 1982 – 1985
- Volumes: 12
- Anime television series
- Directed by: Yoshimichi Nitta
- Produced by: Kenji Yokoyama
- Music by: Kan Ogasawara
- Studio: Toei Animation
- Original network: FNS (Fuji TV)
- Original run: March 18, 1984 – March 17, 1985
- Episodes: 50
- Anime film
- Directed by: Akinori Nagaoka
- Produced by: Kenji Yokoyama
- Written by: Tokio Tsuchiya
- Music by: Kan Ogasawara
- Studio: Toei Animation
- Released: March 16, 1985
- Runtime: 45 minutes
- icon

Gu Gu Ganmo (Japanese: Gu-Guガンモ, Hepburn: Gu-Gu Ganmo) is a Japanese manga series written and illustrated by Fujihiko Hosono. It was originally serialized in Shogakukan's Weekly Shōnen Sunday from 1982 to 1985, and was collected into 12 bound volumes. It was adapted into a fifty-episode anime television series which aired from 1984 to 1985.

== Plot ==
Once upon a time in the city of Tokyo, there was a nine-year-old third-grade boy who went by the name of Hanpeita Tsukuda. He studies in Oedo Elementary School with the American Linda Skylark, the boss Toshimitsu Saigo and the nerdy Kashio Fujita. They often pick on him for nothing but this. And therefore, it began one day when Hanpeita bought himself a pet bird before Ganmo arrived to Earth.

One morning Hanpeita's strong older sister Tsukune Tsukuda, who out of spite, lets his pet bird go via accidental submission. On the way home from middle school, she found a really strange egg from another planet that landed on Earth and brought it home and gave that egg to Hanpeita. However, he isn't pleased with the weird egg. Suddenly, it swells up, cracks its shell, and out comes a pink, strange chicken-like alien creature named Ganmo. It speaks like a human being, and comes to live with the Tsukudas. Not wanting to be a mere freeloader, Ganmo takes the initiative to run errands, clean the house, etc., yet he blunders at everything he does. Ganmo then tries to clear his reputation, but his efforts only end up causing more confusion.

A charming young purple haired girl named Ayumi Ichigaya moves in next door to the Tsukudas. She has a strange pet myna bird named Déjà Vu. It is foppish with a poisonous tongue and always teases Ganmo for being so odd-looking. Thus, the lives of Hanpeita and Ganmo become even more messed up.
