= Saeko Shimazu =

Japanese actress

- 島津 冴子
- Born: September 8, 1959 (age 66); Isehara, Kanagawa, Japan
- Occupations: Actress; voice actress; narrator
- Years active: 1980–present

Saeko Shimazu (島津 冴子, Shimazu Saeko; born September 8, 1959) is a Japanese actress, voice actress and narrator from Isehara. Shimazu is notable for having had voice roles in all four of the major anime television series based on the works of Rumiko Takahashi - she played Shinobu Miyake in Urusei Yatsura, Sayoko Kuroki in Maison Ikkoku, Kodachi Kuno in Ranma ½, and Abi-hime in Inuyasha. Shimazu is currently a freelancer.

== Filmography ==
=== Television animation ===
1980

- Space Warrior Baldios (Emily)
- Rescueman (Nana)
- Mighty Atom (Midori)

1981

- Urusei Yatsura (Shinobu Miyake)
- Golden Warrior Gold Lightan (Emi Takakura, Aishi Raitan)
- Dr. Slump (Hiyoko)
- Dokonjō Gaeru (Pato)
- Muteking, The Dashing Warrior (Kiyomi)

1982

- Gyakuten! Ippatsuman (Mikaduki Nana)
- Sasuga no Sarutobi (Kirigia Mako)
- Combat Mecha Xabungle (Rag Uralo)
- Don Dracula (Chocola)
- Miss Machiko (Ririi Sugishita)
- Magical Princess Minky Momo (Merijien, Chimuru, Teia)

1983

- Cobra (Eris)
- Aura Battler Dunbine (Lana Parkinson)
- Creamy Mami, the Magic Angel (Megumi Ayase)

1984

- Heavy Metal L-Gaim (Oldna Poseidal, Miyama Lilin)
- Bagi, the Monster of Mighty Nature (Bagi)
- Persia, the Magic Fairy (Sayo Mitomo)
- Lupin III (Jieni)

1985

- Mobile Suit Zeta Gundam (Four Murasame)
- Saber Rider and the Star Sheriffs (Annie)
- Dirty Pair (Yuri)
- Dancouga – Super Beast Machine God (Luna Rossa)

1986

- Uchūsen Sagittarius (Henseremu)
- Mobile Suit Gundam ZZ (Four Murasame, Masai Ngava)
- Animated Classics of Japanese Literature (Saeko)
- High School! Kimengumi (Nancy Toruneaata)
- Maison Ikkoku (Sayoko Kuroki)

1987

- Metal Armor Dragonar (Min)
- City Hunter (Midori Oohara)
- Tsuide ni Tonchinkan (Andy Jones)
- Hiatari Ryōkō! (Enomoto Kyouko)

1988

- Mister Ajikko (Shoukichi)

1989

- Ranma ½ (Kodachi Kuno)

1990

- Idol Angel Yokoso Yoko (Kumiko Yoshiaki)
- Tanoshii Moomin Ikka (Raguna)
- Warau Salesman (Mushi Aji Ariko)

1991

- Oishinbo (Mariko Niki)

1992

- Floral Magician Mary Bell (Lucy)

1993

- Cooking Papa (Saeko)

1994

- Magic Knight Rayearth (Narrator)

1995

- El-Hazard (Miz Mishtal)
- Slayers (Remi)
- Sorcerer Hunters (Doctor Iiwa)

1997

- Vampire Princess Miyu (Shinma Jewel-Wash)
- Maze (Medusa)

1998

- El-Hazard: The Alternative World (Miz Mishtal)
- Sentimental Graffiti (Teacher, Opuningunareshon)
- All Purpose Cultural Cat Girl Nuku Nuku (Akiko Natsume)
- Detective Conan (Midori Ozaki)

1999

- Shuukan!! Storyland (Manager)
- Doraemon (Joouari)

2000

- Shuukan!! Storyland (Yamagishi Eiko)

2003

- Detective Conan (Ruri Ojou)

2004

- Inuyasha (Princess Abi)

=== OVA ===
- Earthian (Aya)
- Urusei Yatsura OVAs (Shinobu Miyake)
- Starship Troopers (Claire)
- A-Ko the Versus (Chichi Raiza)
- Kimagure Orange Road Pilot OVA (Madoka Ayukawa)
- Spirit Warrior (Saeko)
- Izumo OVA (Sanae)
- Sakura Wars: Ecole de Paris (Glycine Bleumer)
- Sakura Wars: Le Nouveau Paris (Glycine Bleumer)
- Heavy Metal L-Gaim (Oldna Poseidal)
- El-Hazard OVA (Miz Mishtal)
- El-Hazard: The Magnificent World 2 (Miz Mishtal)
- Glass Mask OVA (Saeko Mizuki, Yuu's mother)
- Sukeban Deka (Emi Mizuchi)
- Dancouga – Super Beast Machine God OVA (Luna Rossa)
- Digital Devil Story: Megami Tensei (Shirasagi Yumiko)
- Dirty Pair OVAs (Yuri)
- All Purpose Cultural Cat Girl Nuku Nuku OVA (Akiko Natsume)
- All Purpose Cultural Cat Girl Nuku Nuku DASH! OVA (Akiko Natsume)
- Mahou no Tenshi Creamy Mami: Eien no Once More (Megumi Ayase)
- Ranma ½ OVA (Kodachi Kuno)
- Lunn Flies into the Wind (Lunn)
- Leina: Wolf Sword Legend (Emi Mizuchi)

=== Theatrical animation ===
- Urusei Yatsura (film series) (Shinobu Miyake)
- Crayon Shin-chan: Pursuit of the Balls of Darkness (Chimama Maho)
- Kentaurosu No Densetsu (Akane)
- Xabungle Graffiti (Rag Rawro)
- Dirty Pair: Project Eden (Yuri)
- Rescueman Movie (Nana)
- Techno Police 21C (Sukyani)
- Detective Conan: Magician of the Silver Sky (Tajima Tenko)
- Ranma ½: Big Trouble in Nekonron, China (Kodachi Kuno)
- Lupin III: Legend of the Gold of Babylon (Lasanga)

=== Video games ===
- Asuka 120% (Tetsuko Ōgigaya)
- Another Century's Episode 2 (Risu Min)
- Anesuto Ebansu Shirizu (Nise Oujo)
- VainDream (Son)
- Urusei Yatsura - Stay With You (Shinobu Miyake)
- Urusei Yatsura - Dear My Friends (Shinobu Miyake)
- SD Gundam G Generation (Four Murasame)
- Kaiser Knuckle (Lihua)
- Kaizou Chounin Shubibinman 3 (Kureha Hime)
- Kensei: Sacred Fist (Kazane Tsukikage)
- Kisetsu Wo Daki Shimete (Bouhoha, Esami)
- Gihren no Yabou (Four Muramase)
- Sakura Taisen 3 ~Pari wa Moeteiru ka~ (Glycine Bleumer)
- Sakura Taisen 4 ~Koi Seyo, Otome~ (Glycine Bleumer)
- Sakura Taisen Monogatari ~Mysterious Paris~ (Glycine Bleumer)
- Dramatic Dungeon Sakura Taisen ~Kimi aru ga tame~ (Glycine Bleumer)
- Super Robot Wars (Four Murasame, Oldna Poseidal, Rag Uralo, Min, Karen)
- Tales of Destiny 2 (Fortuna)
- Tokuda (Shodai Shindei)
- Valis 3 (Varuna)
- Langrisser (Namu)
- Ranma ½ Video Game Series (Kodachi Kuno)
- Rei Koku - Ikeda Kizoku Shinrei Kenkyuusho - (Denwa No Josei)

=== Dubbing ===
- Fearless Hyena Part II, Hsia Ling (Lin Yin-Chu)

== Awards ==
Year	Award	Category	Result	Ref.
1985	8th Anime Grand Prix	Voice actress of the Year	Won	
