= Dirty Pair =

Japanese novel series

- Cover of the novel showing the two protagonists Yuri (left) and Kei (right) and their Coeurl sidekick

ダーティペア (Dāti Pea)
- Genre: Girls with guns; Science fiction comedy; Space opera
- Novel series
- Written by: Haruka Takachiho
- Illustrated by: Yoshikazu Yasuhiko
- Published by: Hayakawa Publishing
- English publisher: NA: Dark Horse Books
- Imprint: Hayakawa Bunko JA
- Original run: May 1980 – December 2018
- Volumes: 9
- Manga

The Great Adventures of the Dirty Pair
- Written by: Hisao Tamaki
- Published by: Tokuma Shoten
- English publisher: NA: Seven Seas Entertainment
- Magazine: Monthly Comic Ryū
- Original run: May 2010 – July 2011
- Volumes: 2
- Anime series
- Dirty Pair (TV series, 1985); Dirty Pair 2 (OVA series, 1987–88); Project Eden (animated film, 1986); Dirty Pair Flash (OVA series, 1994–96)
- icon

Dirty Pair (Japanese: ダーティペア, Hepburn: Dāti Pea) is a series of Japanese light novels (the first one being a fix-up) written by Haruka Takachiho and illustrated by Yoshikazu Yasuhiko that was later adapted into anime and manga versions. The first stories that make up the first volume were first published on the S-F Magazine. The franchise has been published in multiple formats, and adapted into various other media, resulting in eight novels and several shorter stories, a television series, two OVA series, two OVA features, a feature film, a number of graphic novels, and two short Japanese radio series. The 1985 television series won the Animage Anime Grand Prix prize for that year.

The stories take place in the years 2138–2143, by which time humanity has spread across some few thousand star systems. A corporation called the World Welfare Works Association (WWWA or 3WA) helps member systems of the United Galactica (UG) federation deal with various planetary-scale problems, for profit, by sending agents called "trouble consultants". The series focuses on a team of trouble consultants in that section, named Kei and Yuri, who have a reputation for leaving a trail of destruction behind them, for which they are known publicly as the "Dirty Pair", a nickname they hate.

== Premise ==
Kei and Yuri are the two members of Trouble Consultant team 234, code named "Lovely Angels". Almost every mission they are involved with ends up in disaster, though not failure: they typically complete their assignment, but cause incredible collateral damage in the process, earning the nickname the "Dirty Pair", a moniker they hate. They are always cleared of any wrongdoing by the 3WA's Central Computer because the extreme collateral damage is determined to not be their fault, although their mere presence tends to worsen the situations for which they are hired. In some but not all continuities, they have joint extrasensory perception powers, usually limited to precognition. This talent was the reason they were recruited in the first place.

== Characters ==
Kei is a hot-headed tomboy with red hair and tanned skin who wears a silver-white uniform. She favors large weaponry and prefers to "shoot first, ask questions later". The more aggressive of the two, she is attracted to manly, muscular men.

Yuri is of Japanese ethnicity, and wears a golden-yellow uniform. She often uses non-gun weaponry such as energy whips or throwing cards. While the more feminine of the two, she is known to become very violent when crossed. She is a coy flirt who prefers cultured, refined men. Her most recognized weapon is the Bloody Card, a technologically enhanced throwing card that can be used to take down several people at once.

== Development ==
The inspiration for Dirty Pair novels was a 1978 visit to Japan by the British Australian science-fiction author A. Bertram Chandler. On his itinerary was a stop at the young Studio Nue, which Takachiho co-founded. As something to entertain their guest, two of the staffers there, Yuri Tanaka and Keiko Otoguro, hit upon the idea with Takachiho of taking Chandler to a tournament of the All Japan Women's Pro-Wrestling organization, which was a member of the World Women's Wrestling Association (WWWA). The card included the highly-popular wrestling (and singing) team, the Beauty Pair. Something that passed among the foursome during that match led Chandler to remark to Takachiho something to the effect that "the two women in the ring may be the Beauty Pair, but those two with you ought to be called 'the Dirty Pair'."

This became the germ of an idea for a novella Takachiho decided to write, transplanting the rough-housing of pro-wrestling to the realm of space-opera mystery stories, with which he already had experience in his already successful Crusher Joe series. The team code-name "Lovely Angels" is also a play on the names of certain women's teams of the time, such as the Queen Angels.

== Light novels ==
The light novels are written by Haruka Takachiho with illustrations by Yoshikazu Yasuhiko. Between 1980 and 2007, eight novels were published. The first four books were originally serialized in the Japanese publication S-F Magazine. The first two light novels have been released in English translation from DH Press: the complete first book appeared in September 2007, and the second book appeared in April 2008. Previously, English translations existed for the first story (published as one of a series of short books for Japanese students of English) and the fifth book, which was originally released in Japanese and English translation on The Microsoft Network during 1997–99.

=== List ===
No.	Title	Japanese release date	Japanese ISBN
1	The Great Adventure of the Dirty Pair (ダーティペアの大冒険 Dātipea no Daibōken)	May 31, 1980	4-15-030121-2
2	Dirty Pair Strikes Again (ダーティペアの大逆転 Dātipea no Daigyakuten)	July 15, 1985	4-15-203292-8
3	Dirty Pair's Rough and Tumble (ダーティペアの大乱戦 Dātipea no Dairansen)	March 15, 1987	4-15-203325-8
4	The Dirty Pair's Great Escape (ダーティペアの大脱走 Dātipea no Daidassō)	March 31, 1993	4-15-203325-8
5	A Dirty Pair's Side Story: The Legacy of the Dictator (ダーティペア外伝 独裁者の遺産 Dātipea Gaiden: Dokusaisha no Isan)	August 31, 1998	4-15-208181-3
6	The Great Resurrection of the Dirty Pair (ダーティペアの大脱走 Dātipea no Daidassō)	August 15, 2004	4-15-208584-3
7	The Dirty Pair's Great Conquest (ダーティペアの大征服 Dātipea no Daiseifuku)	April 30, 2006	4-15-208724-2
8	The Dirty Pair's Great Empire (ダーティペアの大帝国 Dātipea no Daiteikoku)	October 1, 2007	978-4-15-208870-3
9	The Dirty Pair's Great Leap (ダーティペアの大跳躍 Dātipea no Daihiyaku)	December 15, 2018	978-4-15-209822-1

== Anime ==
=== Television series ===
An anime television series based on the novels, simply titled Dirty Pair, ran for 24 episodes on Nippon Television affiliates from July to December 1985, winning the Animage Anime Grand Prix prize for that year. Scripts had been written for two additional episodes, that were produced after the TV-series had aired, and released as an OVA in January 1987. In subsequent re-airings those two episodes were added to the original show making the series 26 episodes long.

The Dirty Pair anime has a closer setup to the original light novels by Haruka Takachiho than any of the other incarnations. Unlike the light novels, the universe of the anime has a more comical atmosphere and presents the typical styles of a 1980s inspired future. The Lovely Angels and the WWWA reside in a location known as Eleanor City where Kei (voiced by Kyouko Tonguu) and Yuri (voiced by Saeko Shimazu) live in an apartment together in the city's famous Damocles Tower. The chief of the 3WA in this version is Gooley Andrew Francess along with Calico who serves as second in command. The Lovely Angels also have two assistants, a genetically modified feline named Mughi, and a small robot known as Nanmo.

In 2001, the TV series (including the two extra OVA episodes) was licensed for release by ADV in two DVD sets, and was re-released in March 2005 as the Original Dirty Pair Collection Box. It was licensed for a re-released by Nozomi Entertainment. The company released it into two box sets on November 2, 2010, and February 8, 2011, respectively, each containing 13 episodes. These releases contain Japanese dialog with English subtitles. It was also reported that David Williams from Sentai Filmworks did confirm that he offered to produce an English dub with Seraphim Digital for the re-release, but it was declined for reasons not stated. Dirty Pair was aired in North America on the Showtime Beyond channel.

On October 1, 2021, Nozomi Entertainment launched a Kickstarter campaign to release the original television series on Blu-ray, along with the creation of a new English dub to be produced by Headline Studios. The following day, after raising 75% of their $275,000 goal, Nozomi announced in an update that Jessica Calvello would be reprising her role as Yuri from the OVA series dub for the new dub of the original series. An update on October 13 revealed that Pamela Lauer, who last played Kei in the ADV dub of Project Eden in 2005, would be coming out of retirement to reprise her role. On October 30, after reaching $600,000, an update revealed that Jason Douglas would reprise his role as Gooley. The campaign closed on October 31, 2021, with a final pledge tally of $731,406. It was reported in April 2022 that the Blu-ray release would include "original music and effects" and the original version from ADV with "recreated music and effects." The dub was completed on May 30, 2024, as announced on the Kickstarter crowdfunding page for the Blu-ray release.

In August 2024, Crunchyroll stated that the Blu-ray release was in post-production but "suffering from delays." The company stated it was "fully committed" to the project, with Anime News Network noting that English anime fans had expressed concern about non-communication from Crunchyroll or Nozomi Entertainment about the project's status and expressed worry that the acquisition of Right Stuf and Nozomi Entertainment may have "adversely affected the project." Prior to this update, Christopher Farris and Steve Jones of Anime News Network criticized the lack of communication about the project and Crunchyroll's actions regarding the Blu-ray release, describing it as a "fiasco."

=== OVAs ===
A 10-episode OVA series was released on December 21, 1987, through April 21, 1988. ADV released the OVA series on five English dubbed and subtitled VHS tapes from November 11, 1998, to January 25, 2000, each containing two episodes.

The series was later released to bilingual DVD in two five-episode volumes on July 17 and October 23, 2001. A complete collection was released on December 27, 2005. Nozomi Entertainment later re-licensed the OVA series, and re-released it in a remastered bilingual DVD set on January 3, 2012. This included an English dub with Pam Lauer voicing Kei and Jessica Calvello voicing Yuri, plus re-created music and audio effects, as the original wasn't available. This series has been called Original Dirty Pair or Dirty Pair 2 in English.

The series featured two stand-alone OVA hour-long features: Affair of Nolandia (ノーランディアの謎, Nōrandia no Nazo) (1985) and Flight 005 Conspiracy (謀略の005便, Bōryaku no 005-bin) (1990). The first revolves around a plot with the pair tracking down a psychic girl, while the second concerns the pair investigating a mysterious spaceship explosion. Both OVA features were released onto English dubbed VHS on November 23, 1994, and February 21, 1995, respectively by Streamline Pictures and Orion Pictures. They were later re-licensed and re-dubbed by ADV Films and released to bilingual DVD on November 4 and December 2, 2003, respectively. ADV later re-released them to DVD, along with Project Eden, on November 8, 2005, in a 3-DVD boxset. They were later re-licensed by Nozomi Entertainment. The latter released them in a bilingual DVD set (with both Streamline and ADV dubs) with Project Eden on May 8, 2012, as part of the "Dirty Pair: Features DVD Collection."

=== Film ===
Dirty Pair: Project Eden, known in Japan as Dirty Pair: The Movie (ダーティペア, Daati Pea Gekijou-ban), is a feature-length anime film based on the Dirty Pair anime series originally released in Japan on November 28, 1986.

=== Dirty Pair Flash ===
Dirty Pair Flash were three OVAs series totaling 16 episodes, 1994–1996. The story premise and character designs are very different from any of the other versions.

== Comics ==
The American comic company and manga translator Studio Proteus acquired rights to create comic versions of The Dirty Pair in 1989; the first two graphic novels were published by the since-defunct Eclipse Comics. Later the rights were transferred to Dark Horse Comics. The first three series were written by Toren Smith and Adam Warren and drawn by Warren—after that Smith left the project and Warren took over writing completely.

== Manga ==
The Great Adventures of the Dirty Pair (ダーティペアの大冒険, Dāti Pea no Daibōken) is a 2010–2011 manga adaptation by Hisao Tamaki serialised by Tokuma Shoten in Monthly Comic Ryū, that is a retelling of the original Dirty Pair light novel of the same name, but with significant character redesigns. It was released in English by Seven Seas Entertainment in an omnibus volume on December 17, 2019.

== Radio series ==
A fifth version of the "DP Concept" made its debut on 1 October 2006 in a 26-week radio series on FM Osaka, entitled "Lovely Angel: Kei & Yuri". A streaming Internet broadcast of successive episodes became available beginning 15 October. The story involves a case in which the Lovely Angels assist the FBI on a case which takes them along the route of the old Route 66. The series features Horie Yui as Yuri and Minagawa Junko as Kei. While Takachiho participated in the selection of the voice artists, he was not involved in the writing for this series. Additional information on the series, in Japanese, can be found at Nihon Sunrise's site.

A second radio series, "Daatipea91: Kunoichi" began on FM Osaka on 15 October 2007. This time written by Takachiho himself, it places eighteen-year-old Kei and Yuri in Japan in the year 1791 as student ninjas who find themselves embroiled in political affairs of the period. Horie Yui and Minagawa Junko reprised their voice roles. Again, a streaming broadcast was available. This series was re-broadcast during March to April 2009.
