= Kyōko Tongū =

Japanese voice actress

Kyōko Tongū (頓宮 恭子, Tongū Kyōko; born October 11, 1956), is a Japanese voice actress from Okayama, JapanHer most recent anime work has been for Mermaid Forest and Star Fox: Assault. During her earlier career, she was best known for her voice of Kei in Dirty Pair, Smith in Ginga: Nagareboshi Gin and Nakamura in Black Magic M-66. Her last regular role was as the voice of Kikunosuke Abashiri in Abashiri Family. She is still currently active through her agency, Aoni Production.
