= Haruka Takachiho =

Japanese writer

Haruka Takachiho 高千穂 遙
- Born: Kimiyoshi Takekawa; November 7, 1951 (age 74); Nagoya, Japan
- Education: Hosei University
- Occupation: Science fiction author
- Notable work: Crusher Joe, Dirty Pair, Dirty Pair Flash
- Awards: Best Japanese Short Story at the 1980 Seiun Awards for Dirty Pair no Daibōken; Best Japanese Novel at the 1986 Seiun Awards for Dirty Pair no Daigyakuten

Haruka Takachiho (高千穂 遙, Takachiho Haruka) (born November 7, 1951, as Kimiyoshi Takekawa (竹川 公訓, Takekawa Kimiyoshi) in Nagoya, Japan) is a Japanese science fiction author and founder of Studio Nue. Takachiho is best known as the creator of Crusher Joe, Dirty Pair and Dirty Pair Flash. Helen McCarthy in 500 Essential Anime Movies called him one of Japan's leading pulp novelists.

Takachiho established the anime production house Studio Nue in 1972, working as an anime producer and scenario writer, while still a student at Hosei University. He graduated three years later, in 1975, in social science. In 1977 Takachiho made his authorial debut with his novel "Crusher Joe: Rentai Wakusei Pizan no Kiki" ("Crusher Joe: Crisis on Solidarity Planet Pizan"). Two of Takachiho's stories have won Seiun Awards, "Daatipea no Dai Boken" ("Great Adventure of The Dirty Pair") for Best Japanese Short Story in 1980, and "Dirty Pair no Dai Gyakuten" ("The Dirty Pair Strike Again") for Best Japanese Novel in 1986. He held the title of Executive Secretary of the Science Fiction & Fantasy Writers of Japan (SFWJ) until the end of 1997.

== Dirty Pair ==
The inspiration for Dirty Pair novels was a visit to Japan by the British Australian SF author A. Bertram Chandler, in August 1977. On his itinerary was a stop at the young Studio Nue, which Takachiho co-founded. As something to entertain their guest, two of the staffers there, Yuri Tanaka and Keiko Otoguro, hit upon the idea with Takachiho of taking Chandler to a tournament of the All Japan Women's Pro-Wrestling organization, which was a member of the World Women's Wrestling Association (WWWA). The card included the highly-popular wrestling (and singing) team, the Beauty Pair. Something that passed among the foursome during that match led Chandler to remark to Takachiho something to the effect that "the two women in the ring may be the Beauty Pair, but those two with you ought to be called 'the Dirty Pair'."

This became the germ of an idea for a novella Takachiho decided to write, transplanting the rough-housing of pro-wrestling to the realm of space-opera mystery stories, with which he already had experience in his already successful Crusher Joe series. The team code-name "Lovely Angels" is also a play on the names of certain women's teams of the time, such as the Queen Angels.

== Other Works ==
- Crusher Joe series
1. Rentai Wakusei Pizan no Kiki (連帯惑星ピザンの危機) "Crisis on Solidarity Planet Pizanne" (November, 1977)
2. Gekimetsu! Uchū Kaizoku no Wana (撃滅!宇宙海賊の罠) "Extermination! The Space Pirates Trap" (January, 1978)
3. Gingakei Saigo no Hihō (銀河系最後の秘宝) "The Final Secret of the Milky Way" (April, 1978)
4. Ankoku Jashinkyō no Fōkutsu (暗黒邪神教の洞窟) "Cave of the Cult of the Dark God" (July, 1978)
5. Ginga Teikoku e no Yabō (銀河帝国への野望) "Treachery Toward the Galactic Empire" December, 1978)
6. Jimmen Majū no Chōsen (人面魔獣の挑戦) "Challenge of the Human-faced Demon Beasts" (June, 1979)
7. Utsukushi Maō (美しき魔王) "The Beautiful Demon King" (March, 1983)
8. Akuryōtoshi Kukuru (悪霊都市ククル) "Kukuru, the Haunted City" (Part 1: November, 1989; Part 2: March, 1990)
9. Wāmu'uddo no genjū (ワームウッドの幻獣) "The Phantom Beast Wormwood " (October, 2003)
10. Dairon no Seishōjo (ダイロンの聖少女) "The Holy Virgin Dairon" (May, 2005)
- Crusher Joe extra series
1. Nijiiro no Jigoku (虹色の地獄) "Rainbow-colored Hell" (February, 2003)
2. Doruroi no Arashi (ドルロイの嵐) "The Doruroi Storm" (December, 1986) (* originally published as side story' rather than extra series by Asahi Sonorama)
- Dirty Pair series
  - Dātīpea no Daibōken (ダーティペアの大冒険) "Dirty Pair: Great Adventures" (May 1980)
  - Dātīpea no Daigyakuten (ダーティペアの大逆転) "Dirty Pair Strikes Again" (July 1985)
  - Dātīpea no Dairansen (ダーティペアの大乱戦) "Dirty Pair: Rough and Tumble" (March 1987)
  - Dātīpea no Daidassō (ダーティペアの大脱走) "Dirty Pair: Great Escape" (March 1993)
  - Dātīpea no Daifukkatsu (ダーティペアの大復活) "Dirty Pair: Great Resurrection" (August 2004)
  - Dātīpea no Daiseifuku (ダーティペアの大征服) "Dirty Pair: Great Conquest" (April 2006)
  - Dātīpea no Daiteikoku (ダーティペアの大帝国) "Dirty Pair: Great Empire" (October 2007)
  - Dātīpea no Daihiyaku (ダーティペアの大跳躍) "Dirty Pair: Great Leap" (December 2018)
  - Dokusaisha no Isan (独裁者の遺産) "The Legacy of the Dictator" (August 1998)
- Dirty Pair Flash series
  - Tenshi no Yūutsu (ダーティペアFLASH 天使の憂鬱) "Melancholy of the Angels" (December 1994)
  - Tenshi no Hohoemi (ダーティペアFLASH 2 天使の微笑（ほほえみ）) "Smiles of the Angels" (January 1997)
  - Tenshi no Itazura (ダーティペアFLASH 3 天使の悪戯（いたずら）) "Prankster Angels" (September, 1999)
- Shinken Ri Suiryū (神拳 李酔竜) "Li Zuilong of the Divine Fist" aka "Lee Suiron the Godhand" series
  - 1. Yakōju Majō (夜光珠魔城) "Magic Castle of the Shining Night Pearl" (July, 1997)
  - 2. Kīan no Seihai (キーアンの聖杯) "Holy Grail of Kiian" (October, 1997)
  - 3. Mujōdani Aika (無情谷哀歌) "Lament of Heartless Valley" (April, 1998)
  - 4. Bara no Majo (薔薇の魔女) "Rose Witch" (August, 1998)
  - 5. Reijin Zatsugidan (麗人雑技団) "The Beauteous Acrobatic Troupe" (December, 1999)
  - Ginga Saikyō Densetsu: Donrō-hen (銀河最強伝説 貪狼篇) "Legend of the Galaxy's Strongest. Chapter: Hungry Wolf" (October, 1997)
  - Ginga Saikyō Densetsu: Fushichō-hen (銀河最強伝説 不死鳥篇) "Legend of the Galaxy's Strongest. Chapter: Phoenix" (April, 1999)
  - Ginga Saikyō Densetsu: Dakatsu-hen (銀河最強伝説 蛇蝎篇) "Legend of the Galaxy's Strongest. Chapter: Serpents & Scorpions" (October, 2000)
- Igyō Sangokushi (異形三国志) "Nonhuman Romance of the Three Kingdoms" series
  - Norie ga Shogun!? (NORIEが将軍!?) "Norie is a General!?" (Book1: October, 1992; Book2: October, 1993)
  - Gamosu no Maken (ガモスの魔剣) "Magic Sword of Gamos" (Book1: July, 1994; Book2: April, 1996; Book 3: November, 1998)
- Hakobiya Samu (運び屋サム) "Smuggler Sam" series
1. Ginga Bangaichi (銀河番外地) "Galactic unchartered zone" (November 1980)
2. Seijū no Tō (聖獣の塔) "Tower of the Holy Beast" (October 1983)
- Kyōsenshi Ai (凶戦士 愛) "Berserk Warrior Ai" series
1. Kyōsenshi Ai (凶戦士 愛) (June, 1988; January, 1993)
2. Bōsatsu Kyōdan (凶戦士 愛 PART2 謀殺教団) "Part 2:Conspiratorial Murder Cult" (January 1990; February, 1993)
- Ankoku-ken Seiden (暗黒拳聖伝) "The Dark-Fist Hagiography" series
1. Yami no Haō (闇の覇王) "Prince of Darkness" (August, 1988)
2. Chinmoku no Haō (沈黙の覇王) "Prince of Silence" (September, 1990)
3. Gen'ei no Haō (幻影の覇王) "Prince of Illusion" (March, 1995)
- "The Dragon Kung Fu" (ザ・ドラゴンカンフー, Za Doragon Kanfū) series
  - Mezameshi Mono wa Ryū (目覚めしものは竜) "Awaken the Dragon" (January, 1981)
  - Madō Shinwa (魔道神話) "Myth of Sorcery" (3 vols.; May, 1986; July, 1987; October, 1988)

Individual titles

- Ōkami-tachi no Kōya (狼たちの曠野) "Wolves' Wilderness" (April, 1981)
- Isekai no Yūshi (異世界の勇士) "Warrior from Another World" (Tsuru Shobō: February, 1979; Tokuma Shoten: May, 1981)
- Bijū Kamigami no Senshi (美獣-神々の戦士-（上）（下）) "Beautiful Beast: Warrior of the Gods" (2 vols.; April 1985)
- Natsu Kaze Raidā (夏・風・ライダー) "Summer, Wind, Rider" (May, 1984)
- Hiru Kuraimā (ヒルクライマー) "Hill Climber" (July, 2009)
