= List of animated television series of 1985 =

A list of animated television series first aired in 1985.

Animated television series first aired in 1985
Title	Episodes	Country	Year	Notes	Technique
The 13 Ghosts of Scooby-Doo	13	United States	1985	Spin-off of Scooby-Doo, Where Are You! and The New Scooby and Scrappy-Doo Show.	Traditional
Adventures of the Gummi Bears	65	United States	1985–91		Traditional
Alias the Jester	13	United Kingdom	1985–86		Traditional
The Berenstain Bears (1985)	52	United States	1985–87	Version of Berenstain Bears.	Traditional
Bertha	13	United Kingdom	1985–86		Stop-Motion
Bigfoot and the Muscle Machines	9	United States	1985–86	Aired as part of Super Sunday	Traditional
Bill the Minder	15	United Kingdom	1985		Traditional
Bojan the Bear	36	Slovenia	1985–99		Traditional
Captain Harlock and the Queen of a Thousand Years	65	United States; Japan	1985		Traditional
Care Bears	11	United States	1985	Version of Care Bears	CGI
CBS Storybreak	26	United States	1985–89		Traditional
Clémentine	39	France	1985–86		Traditional
Fantadroms	13	Latvian SSR; Latvia	1985–95		Traditional
Fingermouse	13	United Kingdom	1985		Live-action
The Funtastic World of Hanna-Barbera		United States	1985–94		Traditional
Galtar and the Golden Lance	21	United States	1985–86	The Funtastic World of Hanna-Barbera segment.	Traditional
The Giddy Game Show	52	United Kingdom	1985–87		Traditional
Hulk Hogan's Rock 'n' Wrestling	26	United States	1985–86		Traditional
It's Punky Brewster	26	United States	1985–86	Spin-off of Punky Brewster.	Traditional
Jayce and the Wheeled Warriors	65	United States	1985		Traditional
Jem	65	United States	1985–88		Traditional
The Little Green Man	13	United Kingdom	1985		Traditional
Little Muppet Monsters	3	United States	1985	Spin-off of Muppet Babies and The Muppet Show.	Traditional
M.A.S.K.	75	United States; France (season 1)	1985–86		Traditional
Mop and Smiff	13	UK	1985–86		Live-action/Traditional
Paw Paws	21	United States	1985–86	The Funtastic World of Hanna-Barbera segment.	Traditional
Pob's Programme	82	United Kingdom	1985–90		Live-action
Quick & Flupke	260	Belgium; France	1985		Traditional
The Raccoons	60	Canada	1985–91		Traditional
Robo Story	52	France	1985		Traditional
Robotech	85	United States; Japan	1985		Anime
Robotix	15	United Kingdom	1985–86	Aired as part of Super Sunday	Traditional
Rocky Hollow	26	United Kingdom	1985–86		Stop-Motion
Scooby's Mystery Funhouse	21	United States	1985–86	Featured segments from Scooby-Doo and Scrappy-Doo and The New Scooby and Scrappy-Doo Show.	Traditional
Seabert	26	France	1985		Traditional
Sectaurs	5	United States	1985		Traditional
She-Ra: Princess of Power	93	United States	1985–87	Spin-off of He-Man and the Masters of the Universe.	Traditional
Spartakus and the Sun Beneath the Sea	52	France	1985–87		Traditional
Star Wars: Droids	13	United States	1985	Spin-off of Star Wars.	Traditional
Star Wars: Ewoks	26	United States	1985–86	Spin-off of Star Wars.	Traditional
The Super Powers Team: Galactic Guardians	8	United States	1985		Traditional
Super Sunday	58	United States	1985–86		Traditional
ThunderCats (1985)	130	United States	1985–89		Traditional
Vackor az első bében	11	Hungary	1985		Traditional
The World of David the Gnome	26	Spain	1985–86		Traditional
The Wuzzles	13	United States	1985		Traditional
Yogi's Treasure Hunt	27	United States	1985–88	The Funtastic World of Hanna-Barbera segment.	Traditional

Anime television series first aired in 1985
Title	Episodes	Country	Year	Notes	
Bumpety Boo	130	Japan	1985–86		Anime
Blue Comet SPT Layzner	38	Japan	1985–86		Anime
Dancouga – Super Beast Machine God	38	Japan	1985		Anime
Dirty Pair	24	Japan	1985		Anime
GeGeGe no Kitarō	115	Japan	1985–88		Anime
High School! Kimengumi	86	Japan	1985–87		Anime
Honō no Alpen Rose: Judy & Randy	20	Japan	1985		Anime
Mobile Suit Zeta Gundam	50	Japan	1985–86		Anime
Musashi no Ken	72	Japan	1985–86		Anime
Ninja Senshi Tobikage	43	Japan	1985–86		Anime
Obake no Q-Tarō	510	Japan	1985–87		Anime
Onegai! Samia-don	39	Japan	1985–86		Anime
Princess Sara	46	Japan	1985		Anime
Magical Emi, the Magic Star	38	Japan	1985–86		Anime
Touch	101	Japan	1985–87		Anime
Yume no Hoshi no Button Nose	26	Japan	1985–86		Anime

== See also ==
- List of animated feature films of 1985
- List of Japanese animation television series of 1985
