= List of animated feature films of 1985 =

This is a list of animated feature films first released in 1985.

== List ==
| Title | Country | Director | Production company | Animation technique | Format | Notes | Release date | Duration |
|---|---|---|---|---|---|---|---|---|
| 20,000 Leagues Under the Sea | Australia | | Burbank Films Australia | Traditional | Television film | | December 17, 1985 | 50 minutes |
| The Adventures of Mark Twain | United States | Will Vinton | Will Vinton Productions; Harbour Town Films | Stop motion/Claymation | Theatrical | First fully Clay animated feature film. | March 1, 1985 | 86 minutes |
| The Adventures of Robin Hood | Australia | | Burbank Films Australia | Traditional | Television film | | July 13, 1985 | 50 minutes |
| Angel's Egg 天使のたまご (Tenshi no Tamago) | Japan | Mamoru Oshii | Studio Deen; Tokuma Shoten (distributor) | Traditional | Theatrical | | December 15, 1985 | 71 minutes |
| Area 88: The Movie エリア88 劇場版 (Area 88 Gekijō-ban) | Japan | Hisayuki Toriumi | Studio Pierrot | Traditional | Theatrical; Compilation film | Re-edited compilation film of the first two episodes of the OVA series Area 88, based on the manga of the same name, that ran for four 65 minute episodes from February 5, 1985 until June 15, 1986. | July 20, 1985 | 99 minutes |
| Armored Trooper Votoms: The Last Red Shoulder 装甲騎兵ボトムズ ザ・ラストレッドショルダー (Sōkō Kihei Botomuzu: The Last Red Shoulder) | Japan | Ryousuke Takahashi | Sunrise; Bandai Visual (distributor) | Traditional | Direct-to-video; OVA | | August 21, 1985 | 50 minutes |
| Asterix Versus Caesar; Astérix et la Surprise de César (Asterix and the Surprise of Caesar) | France; Belgium | Gaëtan Brizzi; Paul Brizzi | Gaumont (distributor); Dargaud Films; Les Productions René Goscinny | Traditional | Theatrical | Fourth installment in the Asterix film series; Plot adapted and composited from volumes 4 and 10 of the comic book series respectively. | December 11, 1985 | 74 minutes |
| Bigfoot and the Muscle Machines | United States | John Gibbs; Ray Lee; Terry Lennon | Marvel Productions; Sunbow Productions; Toei Animation (animation services) | Traditional | Direct-to-video; Compilation film | Compilation film of the 9-episode animated television miniseries ran in 1985, as part of the series Super Sunday that ran from October 6, 1985 to October 1986. | ? | 53 minutes |
| The Black Cauldron | United States | Ted Berman; Richard Rich | Walt Disney Productions; Silver Screen Partners II | Traditional | Theatrical | The first Disney animated feature to be recorded in Dolby Stereo and rated PG by the MPA. | July 24, 1985 | 80 minutes |
| Bobby's Girl ボビーに首ったけ (Bobby ni Kubittake) | Japan | Hiroyoshi Shimizu; Toshio Hirata | Madhouse; Project Team Argos; Toei Company (distributor); Kadokawa Haruki Jimusho | Traditional | Theatrical | | March 9, 1985 | 44 minutes |
| The Brave Frog's Greatest Adventure | United States; Japan | ? | Harmony Gold (distributor); Tatsunoko Production | Traditional | Direct-to-video; Compilation film | Second compilation film of the animated television series Demetan Croaker, The Boy Frog that ran from January 2 until September 25, 1973 for a total of 39 half hour episodes; this film covers the events in the series' final four episodes (from 36 "Namazu nyuudou ni makeru na" to 39 "Hibike heiwa no Kerokero fue" respectively). | ? | 91 minutes |
| Captain Tsubasa: Ayaushi, Zen Nippon Jr. キャプテン翼 危うし! 全日本Jr. (Captain Tsubasa: Attention! The Japanese Jr. Selection) | Japan | Hiroyoshi Mitsunobu | Tsuchida Production | Traditional | Theatrical | | December 21, 1985 | 60 minutes |
| Captain Tsubasa: Europe Daikessen キャプテン翼 ヨーロッパ大決戦 (Captain Tsubasa: The Great Europe Battle) | Japan | Hiroyoshi Mitsunobu | Tsuchida Production | Traditional | Theatrical | | July 13, 1985 | 41 minutes |
| The Care Bears Movie | Canada; United States | Arna Selznick | Nelvana Limited; American Greetings; The Samuel Goldwyn Company (distributor) | Traditional | Theatrical | | March 29, 1985 | 75 minutes |
| Cosmo Police Justy; Cosmo Police ジャスティ (Kosumo Porīsu Jasuti) | Japan | Motosuke Takahashi | Studio Pierrot | Traditional | Direct-to-video; OVA | | July 20, 1985 | 44 minutes |
| Creamy Mami, the Magic Angel: Long Goodbye 魔法の天使クリィミーマミ ロング・グッドバイ (Mahō no Tenshi Kurīmī Mami: Long Goodbye) | Japan | Mochizuki Tomomi | Studio Pierrot | Traditional | Direct-to-video; OVA | | June 15, 1985 | 55 minutes |
| The Dagger of Kamui カムイの剣 (Kamui no Ken) | Japan | Rintaro | Madhouse | Traditional | Theatrical | | March 9, 1985 | 132 minutes |
| Dallos Special ダロス・スペシャル (Darosu Supesharu) | Japan | Hisayuki Toriumi; Mamoru Oshii | Studio Pierrot | Traditional | Direct-to-video; OVA; Compilation film | Compilation film of the inaugural OVA series that ran for four 30 minute episodes from December 16, 1983 until August 5, 1984. | August 5, 1985 | 83 minutes |
| Dirty Pair: Affair of Nolandia ダーティペアの大勝負 ノーランディアの謎 (Dirty Pair no Taishoubu: Nolandia no Nazo) | Japan | Masaharu Okuwaki | Sunrise | Traditional | Direct-to-video; OVA | | December 20, 1985 | 55 minutes |
| Dokgo Tak 3 – The Mound Rediscovered 독고탁 3 – 다시 찾은 마운드 (Dokgo Tak 3: dasi chajeun maundeu) | South Korea | Mun Deog-seong | Daewon Donghwa | Traditional | Theatrical | Third feature in the Dokgo Tak series. | August 13, 1985 | 70 minutes |
| Doraemon: Nobita's Little Star Wars ドラえもん のび太の宇宙小戦争 (Doraemon: Nobita no Ritoru Sutā Wōzu) | Japan | Tsutomu Shibayama | Asatsu; Shin-Ei Animation; Toho (distributor) | Traditional | Theatrical | | March 16, 1985 | 98 minutes |
| Dot and the Koala | Australia | Yoram Gross | Yoram Gross Films; Hoyts (distributor) | Traditional/Live action | Theatrical | | June 20, 1985 | 71 minutes |
| Epic | Australia | Yoram Gross | Yoram Gross Films | Traditional | ? | | May 14, 1985 | 70 minutes |
| Fire Tripper 炎トリッパー (Honoo Torippā) | Japan | Osamu Uemura | Studio Pierrot | Traditional | Direct-to-video; OVA | | December 16, 1985 | 50 minutes |
| Gon, the Little Fox ごんぎつね (Gongitsune) | Japan | Kosei Maeda | Aikikaku Center | Traditional | Theatrical | | March 16, 1985 | 76 minutes |
| GoShogun: The Time Étranger 戦国魔神ゴーショーグン 時の異邦人(エトランゼ) (Sengoku Majin Goshōgun: Toki no Étranger) | Japan | Kunihiko Yuyama | Ashi Productions | Traditional | Theatrical | | April 27, 1985 | 90 minutes |
| Greed グリード (GREED) | Japan | Tomonori Kogawa | Bebow; Filmlink International; Toyo Links Corps. Pony Canyon (distributor) | Traditional | Direct-to-video; OVA | | January 21, 1985 | 57 minutes |
| Gu Gu Ganmo; Gu-Guガンモ | Japan | Akinori Nagaoka | Toei Animation | Traditional | Theatrical | | March 16, 1985 | 45 minutes |
| Gwen, the Book of Sand; Gwen, le livre de sable | France | Jean-François Laguionie | Gaumont (distributor) | Traditional | Theatrical | | February 6, 1985 | 67 minutes |
| Happy Days of the Moomins; Szczęśliwe dni Muminków | Poland | Lucjan Dembinski; Krystyna Kulczycka; Dariusz Zawilski; Jadwiga Kudrzycka | Se-ma-for | Stop motion | Theatrical | | January 1, 1985 | 58 minutes |
| He-Man & She-Ra: A Christmas Special | United States | Bill Reed; Ernie Schmidt | Filmation | Traditional | Television special | | December 25, 1985 | 44 minutes |
| Here Come the Littles | United States; France; Canada; Japan; Luxembourg | Bernard Deyriès | DIC Entertainment; ABC Entertainment; Atlantic Releasing Corporation (distributor) | Traditional | Theatrical | First Luxembourgian animated feature. | May 25, 1985 | 75 minutes |
| A Journey Through Fairyland a. k. a. Fairy Florence 妖精フローレンス (Yōsei Furōrensu) | Japan | Masami Hata | Sanrio | Traditional | Theatrical | Sanrio's final feature-length anime until 2007. | October 19, 1985 | 91 minutes |
| Kalabaza tripontzia The Magic Pumpkin (La calabaza mágica) | Spain | Juan Bautista Berasategi | Jalzkibel Kultur | Traditional | ? | | ? | 90 minutes |
| Karuizawa Syndrome 軽井沢シンドローム | Japan | Mizuho Nishikubo | Shogakukan-Shueisha Productions; Kitty Films; Pony Canyon (distributor) | Traditional | Direct-to-video; OVA | | July 5, 1985 | 76 minutes |
| Kinnikuman: Hour of Triumph! Justice Superman キン肉マン 晴れ姿！正義超人 (Kinnikuman: Haresugata! Seigi Chōjin) | Japan | Takenori Kawada | Toei Animation | Traditional | Theatrical | | December 21, 1985 | 60 minutes |
| Kinnikuman: Justice Supermen vs. Ancient Supermen キン肉マン 正義超人vs古代超人 (Kinnikuman: Seigi Chōjin vs Kodai Chōjin) | Japan | Yasuo Yamayoshi | Toei Animation | Traditional | Theatrical | | March 16, 1985 | 45 minutes |
| Leda: The Fantastic Adventure of Yohko 幻夢戦記レダ (Genmu Senki Leda) | Japan | Kunihiko Yuyama | Toho (distributor); Kaname Production | Traditional | Direct-to-video; OVA | | March 1, 1985 | 75 minutes |
| The Life & Adventures of Santa Claus | United States; Japan | Jules Bass; Arthur Rankin Jr. | Rankin/Bass Animated Entertainment; Video Tokyo Production; Telepictures Corporation (distributor) | Stop motion | Television special | Rankin/Bass' final "Animagic" production. | December 17, 1985 | 50 minutes |
| Little Memole: Marielle's Jewelbox とんがり帽子のメモル マリエルの宝石箱 (Tongari Bōshi no Memoru: Marielle no Hōsekibako) | Japan | Isamu Tsuchida | Toei Animation | Traditional | Direct-to-video; OVA | | July 21, 1985 | 75 minutes |
| The Little Vagabond; El pequeño vagabundo | Spain | Manuel Rodriguez Jara (credited as "Rodjara") | M.R. Films | Traditional | Theatrical | | July 29, 1985 | 84 minutes |
| Love Position – The Legend of Halley ラブ・ポジション ハレー伝説 (Love Position – Halley Densetsu) | Japan | Shuji Iuchi | Pack-In Video (distributor); Tezuka Productions; Sunshine Corporation | Traditional | Direct-to-video; OVA | | December 16, 1985 | 93 minutes |
| Ludwig's Think Tank | United States | | Walt Disney Productions (archive footage); ARDEENE Productions; Disney Channel (distributor) | Traditional | Television special Compilation film | Compilation of Disney theatrical animated shorts that concern learning; Wayne Allwine provided new redubbed lines for Ludwig Von Drake in the special. | September 1, 1985 | 90 minutes |
| Lupin III: Legend of the Gold of Babylon ルパン三世 バビロンの黄金伝説 (Rupan Sansei: Babiron no Ōgon Densetsu) | Japan | Seijun Suzuki; Shigetsugu Yoshida | Toho (distributor); Tokyo Movie Shinsha | Traditional | Theatrical | | July 13, 1985 | 100 minutes |
| Mach and Sebestova – Come Up to the Blackboard! Mach a Sebestová k tabuli! | Czechoslovakia | Adolf Born; Jaroslav Doubrava; Milos Macourek | Krátký film Praha | Traditional | ? | Film compiled from seven selected episodes of the television series Mach a Šebestová. | ? | 68 minutes |
| Magical Princess Minky Momo – La Ronde in my Dream 魔法のプリンセス ミンキーモモ 夢の中の輪舞 (Mahou no Princess Minky Momo: Yume no Naka no Rondo) | Japan | Hiroshi Watanabe | Ashi Productions | Traditional | Direct-to-video; OVA | | July 28, 1985 | 81 minutes |
| The Man in the Iron Mask | Australia | | Burbank Films Australia | Traditional | Television film | | July 26, 1985 | 54 minutes |
| Megazone 23 メガゾーン23 (Megazōn Tsū Surī) | Japan | Noboru Ishiguro | AIC; Tatsunoko Production | Traditional | Direct-to-video; OVA | Part one of a four-part OVA series; an alternate 107 minute version of the film was released theatrically 14 days later on March 23. | March 9, 1985 | 80 minutes |
| Micro Commando Diatron 5 a. k. a. Space Transformers 마이크로 특공대 다이아트론5 | South Korea | An Bong-sik; Jeong Su-yong | Daekwang Planning Co., Ltd. | Traditional | Theatrical | | July 20, 1985 | 63 minutes |
| Molly and the Skywalkerz: Happily Ever After | United States | Bill Melendez; Steven Cuitlahuac Melendez | JZM Productions; Bill Melendez Productions; WonderWorks; PBS | Traditional | Television film | | October 20, 1985 | 60 minutes |
| The Monkey King Conquers the Demon a. k. a. Monkey Conquers the Demon 金猴降妖 | China | Te Wei; Yan Ding-Xian; Lin Wen-Xiao | Shanghai Animation Film Studio | Traditional | Theatrical | | ? | 89 minutes |
| Mujeokcheorin lamboteu 무적철인 람보트 (Invincible Iron Man Rambot) | South Korea | Mun Deog-seong | | Traditional | Theatrical | | December 21, 1985 | 70 minutes |
| Nicholas Nickleby | Australia | | Burbank Films Australia | Traditional | Television film | | March 16, 1985 | 72 minutes |
| Night on the Galactic Railroad 銀河鉄道の夜 (Ginga Tetsudō no Yoru) | Japan | Gisaburo Sugii | Group TAC; Studio Gallop | Traditional | Theatrical | | July 13, 1985 | 105 minutes |
| Odin: Photon Sailer Starlight a. k. a. Odin: Starlight Mutiny オーディーン 光子帆船スターライト (Odin: Koshi Hansen Starlight) | Japan | Eiichi Yamamoto; Takeshi Shirato; Toshio Masuda; Yoshinobu Nishioka | Toei Animation; West Cape Production | Traditional | Theatrical | | August 10, 1985 | 140 minutes |
| Odyssea; Die Irrfahrten des Odysseus (The Wanderings of Odysseus) | Czechoslovakia; East Germany | Jiří Tyller | Krátký film Praha; DEFA-Studio für Trickfilme | Cutout/Live action | ? | Produced from 1983–1985. Released in the GDR in 1986. | September 5, 1986 | 68 minutes |
| Peter-No-Tail in Americat; Pelle Svanslös i Amerikatt | Sweden | Stig Lasseby; Jan Gissberg | Farago Film; Filmhuset AS; Sandrews; Semic; Svenska Filminstitutet (SFI) (distributor); Teamfilm AS | Traditional | Theatrical | | December 14, 1985 | 78 minutes |
| Penguin's Memory: Shiawase Monogatari ペンギンズ・メモリー幸福物語 (Penguin's Memory: A Tale of Happiness) | Japan | Shunji Kimura | Toho (distributor); CM Land; Hakuhodo Inc. SUNTORY; Animation Staff Room | Traditional | Theatrical | | July 22, 1985 | 102 minutes |
| The Pickwick Papers | Australia | | Burbank Films Australia | Traditional | Television film | | March 26, 1985 | 71 minutes |
| The Pied Piper; Krysař (The Ratman) | Czechoslovakia | Jiří Barta | Krátký film Praha | Stop motion | Theatrical | | September 1986 | 53 minutes |
| Pohádky pod sněhem Fairy Tales Under the Snow | Czechoslovakia | Zdeněk Smetana | Krátký film Praha; Studio Jirího Trnky | Traditional | Theatrical | | October 1, 1986 | 64 minutes |
| The Prince of Devil Island: The Three-Eyed One 悪魔島のプリンス 三つ目がとおる (Akumatō no Purinsu: Mitsume ga Tōru) | Japan | Yugo Serikawa | Toei Animation; Nippon TV (distributor) | Traditional | Television film | Eighth animated special produced for Nippon TV's 24 Hour TV "Love Saves the Earth" telethon, and the second of only three specials not to be produced by Tezuka Productions. | August 25, 1985 | 85 minutes |
| Rainbow Brite and the Star Stealer | United States; France | Bernard Deyriès; Kimio Yabuki | DIC Entertainment; Hallmark Cards; Warner Bros. Pictures (distributor) | Traditional | Theatrical | | November 15, 1985 | 85 minutes |
| Robby the Rascal | Japan | ? | Knack Productions; KidPix Productions (distributor) | Traditional | Direct-to-video; Compilation film | Compilation film of the animated television series Cybot Robotchi that ran from October 7, 1982 to June 29, 1983 for a total of 39 episodes. | ? | 90 minutes |
| The Robot Corps and Mecha 3 로보트군단과 메카3 (Roboteugundangwa Meka3) | South Korea | Kim Cheong-gi | Seoul Donghwa Production | Traditional | Theatrical | | October 19, 1985 | 68 minutes |
| Robot King Sun Shark 로보트왕 썬샤크 | South Korea | Bak Seung-cheol | 3rd Advertisement | Traditional/Live action | Theatrical | | July 20, 1985 | 62 minutes |
| Sangokushi 三国志 (Three Kingdoms) | Japan | Tetsuo Imazawa | Shin-Ei Animation; Nippon TV (distributor) | Traditional | Television special | | March 20, 1985 | 90 minutes |
| The Secret of the Sword | United States | Ed Friedman; Lou Kachivas; Marsh Lamore; Bill Reed; Gwen Wetzler | Filmation; Atlantic Releasing Corporation (distributor) | Traditional | Theatrical; Compilation film | The first five episodes of the animated television series She-Ra: Princess of Power (1985–1987) ("Into Etheria", "Beast Island", "She-Ra Unchained", "Reunions" and "Battle for Bright Moon", respectively) all compiled into a single narrative with minor edits made to the plot; originally released before the series' premiere later in the year on September 9. | March 22, 1985 | 91 minutes |
| The Secrets of a Wicker Bay; Tajemnice wiklinowej zatoki | Poland | Wiesław Zięba | Studio Miniatur Filmowych | Traditional | ? | Compilation film of the Polish animated television serial that ran for seven 21 minute episodes from 1984 until 1988. | ? | 73 minutes |
| The Snow Country Prince 雪国の王子さま | Japan | Tomoharu Katsumata | Toei Animation; Shinano Art & Culture Consultant (distributor) | Traditional | Theatrical | | December 21, 1985 | 88 minutes |
| Starchaser: The Legend of Orin | United States; South Korea | Steven Hahn | Young Sung Production Co. Ltd. Atlantic Releasing Corporation (distributor) | Traditional | Theatrical | Originally produced and released in the 3D film format. | November 22, 1985 | 107 minutes |
| Szaffi a. k. a. The Treasure of Swamp Castle; Le trésor des marécages Saffi und der Zigeunerbaron | Hungary; Canada; West Germany | Attila Dargay | Pannónia Filmstúdió; Sefel Pictures International (distributor); Infafilm Gmbh (distributor) | Traditional | Theatrical | | April 11, 1985 | 76 minutes |
| Time Patrol | Japan | Gregory Snegoff | Harmony Gold (distributor); Tatsunoko Production | Traditional | Television film Compilation film | Another compilation film of the animated television series Time Bokan that ran from October 4, 1975 to December 25, 1976 for a total of 61 episodes. | ? | 72 minutes |
| Ttoriwa Jeta Roboteu 똘이와 제타 로보트 (Ttol-yi and Zeta Robot) a. k. a. 김청기 로봇군단 슈퍼제타 (Dolly and Zeta Robot) | South Korea | Kim Cheong-gi | Seoul Dongwha Production Co., Ltd. | Traditional | Theatrical | | January 17, 1985 | 58 minutes |
| Urusei Yatsura 3: Remember My Love うる星やつら3 リメンバー・マイ・ラヴ (Urusei Yatsura 3: Rimenbā Mai Ravu) | Japan | Kazuo Yamazaki | Studio Deen; Toho (distributor) | Traditional | Theatrical | Third feature in the Urusei Yatsura film series. | January 26, 1985 | 93 minutes |
| Urusei Yatsura: Ryoko's September Tea Party うる星やつら 了子の9月のお茶会 (Urusei Yatsura: Ryouko no 9-gatsu no Ochakai) | Japan | Keiji Hayakawa; Junji Nishimura; Mamoru Oshii; Tsugio Ozawa; Iku Suzuki; Osamu Uemura; Kazuo Yamazaki; Naoyuki Yoshinaga | Fuji TV (distributor); Kitty Films; Studio Deen | Traditional | Television special | | September 24, 1985 | 48 minutes |
| Vampire Hunter D 吸血鬼ハンターD (Kyuuketsuki Hantaa D) | Japan | Toyoo Ashida | Toho (distributor); Ashi Productions | Traditional | Theatrical | | December 21, 1985 | 80 minutes |
| Vampires in Havana ¡Vampiros en La Habana! | Cuba; Spain | Juan Padrón | Manfred Durniok Produktion für Film und Fernsehen; Instituto Cubano del Arte e Industrias Cinematográficos (ICAIC); Radio Televisión Española (RTVE) | Traditional | Theatrical | | ? | 69 minutes |
| We Called Them Montagues and Capulets; Нарекохме ги Монтеки и Капулети (Narekohme gi Monteki i Kapuleti) | Bulgaria | Donyo Donev | Boyana Film | Traditional | Theatrical | | June 27, 1985 | 89 minutes |
| What's Michael? ホワッツ マイケル? (Howattsu Maikeru?) | Japan | Makoto Nagaro | Kitty Films | Traditional | Direct-to-video; OVA | | November 25, 1985 | 55 minutes |
| You're a Good Man, Charlie Brown | United States | Sam Jaimes | Charles M. Schulz Creative Associates; United Media Productions; Mendelson-Melendez Productions | Traditional | Television special | Third hour-long Peanuts special. | November 6, 1985 | 50 minutes |

== Highest-grossing animated films of the year ==
| Rank | Title | Studio | Worldwide gross | Ref. |
|---|---|---|---|---|
| 1 | The Care Bears Movie | Nelvana Limited / American Greetings | $34,000,000 ($22,934,622)^{*} | |
| 2 | The Black Cauldron | Walt Disney Productions | $21,288,692 | |
| 3 | Doraemon: Nobita's Little Star Wars | Asatsu / Toho | $9,600,000 (¥2,040,000,000) | |
| 4 | The Secret of the Sword | Filmation / Atlantic Releasing | $7,660,857 | |
| 5 | Here Come the Littles | DIC Entertainment / ABC Entertainment / Atlantic Releasing | $6,565,359 | |
| 6 | The Adventures of Mark Twain | Clubhouse Pictures / Will Vinton Productions | $849,915 | |

== See also ==
- List of animated television series of 1985
