= 1985 in animation =

Events in 1985 in animation.

== Events ==
=== January ===
- January 23: The first episode of ThunderCats airs.

=== March ===
- March 1: Will Vinton's The Adventures of Mark Twain is first released. which will become a cult classic.
- March 4: The first episode of The World of David the Gnome airs.
- March 20: The Peanuts TV special Snoopy's Getting Married, Charlie Brown premieres on CBS.
- March 22: He-Man and She-Ra: The Secret of the Sword is first released, the first animated feature based on a toy line.
- March 24: The Care Bears Movie is first released.
- March 25: 57th Academy Awards: Charade by Jon Minnis wins the Academy Award for Best Animated Short.

=== May ===
- May 8–19: 1986 Cannes Film Festival: Jiří Barta's The Pied Piper premieres.
- The Norwegian band A-ha releases a re-recorded version of their song Take On Me, with a partially animated music video, in which a girl is brought into a comic book world. The video is directed by Steve Barron and Candace Reckinger, with the animation done by Michael Patterson. The comic featured in the music video is drawn by Michael Patterson and later printed in the sleeve of the single release.
- May 18: The Fat Albert and the Cosby Kids episode "Gang Wars" airs where a character dies onscreen, proclaiming this as one of the darker episodes.
- May 25: DIC Entertainment's Here Come the Littles premieres. The film gained much infamy for its outsourced animation and thematic storylines. It ultimately put an end to The Littles cartoon series.

=== June ===
- June 15: Studio Ghibli is founded.
- Specific date unknown: Richard Condie's The Big Snit is released.

=== July ===
- July 4: The first episode of The Raccoons airs.
- July 24: The Walt Disney Company releases The Black Cauldron, Disney's first animated film to receive the PG rating and the only one until Dinosaur in 2000. The film went into obscurity for 13 years after the release due to suffering a great deal of bad reputation and budget problems. It became a cult classic in later years, shedding its undeserved reputation.

=== September ===
- September 7:
  - The first episodes of Ewoks and Star Wars: Droids air, both based on Star Wars.
  - The first episode of The 13 Ghosts of Scooby-Doo airs. This incarnation of Scooby-Doo gained much notoriety by Christian groups for its occultic setting in a Saturday morning cartoon at its time.
- September 14:
  - The first episode of Hulk Hogan's Rock 'n' Wrestling airs, based on popular wrestler Hulk Hogan.
  - The first episodes of The Wuzzles and Gummi Bears air. They are Walt Disney Company's first animated television series.
  - The first episode of The Care Bears airs.
- September 15: The first episode of Paw Paws airs. This particular cartoon gained some infamy during the broadcast for prominent Indigious stereotyping and is later declared "politically incorrect" in 2014.

=== October ===
- October 3: The first episode of Seabert airs.
- October 30: Garfield's Halloween Adventure premieres on CBS.

=== November ===
- November 6: The Peanuts TV special You're a Good Man, Charlie Brown premieres on CBS. The special is an animated adaptation of the 1967 stage play of the same name.
- November 15: Rainbow Brite and the Star Stealer is first released. It was a commercial disappointment.
- November 22: Starchaser: The Legend of Orin premiers, the first animated feature film released in 3-D.

=== December ===
- December 10: Bugs Bunny receives a star at the Hollywood Walk of Fame.
- December 11: The third Astérix film Asterix Versus Caesar is released.
- December 14: The film Peter-No-Tail in Americat is released.

=== Specific date unknown ===
- The computer animation company H.K. Screen Art is established in Hong Kong.

== Films released ==
- January 1 - Happy Days of the Moomins (Poland)
- January 17 - Ttoriwa Jeta Roboteu (South Korea)
- January 21 - Greed (Japan)
- January 26 - Urusei Yatsura 3: Remember My Love (Japan)
- February 6 - Gwen, the Book of Sand (France)
- March 1:
  - The Adventures of Mark Twain (United States)
  - Leda: The Fantastic Adventure of Yohko (Japan)
- March 9:
  - Bobby's Girl (Japan)
  - The Dagger of Kamui (Japan)
  - Megazone 23 (Japan)
- March 16:
  - Doraemon: Nobita's Little Star Wars (Japan)
  - Gon, the Little Fox (Japan)
  - Gu Gu Ganmo (Japan)
  - Kinnikuman: Justice Supermen vs. Ancient Supermen (Japan)
  - Nicholas Nickleby (Australia)
- March 20 - Sangokushi (Japan)
- March 22 - The Secret of the Sword (United States)
- March 26 - The Pickwick Papers (Australia)
- March 29 - The Care Bears Movie (Canada and United States)
- April 11 - Szaffi (Hungary, Canada, and West Germany)
- April 27 - GoShogun: The Time Étranger (Japan)
- May 14 - Epic (Australia)
- May 25 - Here Come the Littles (United States, France, Canada, Japan, and Luxembourg)
- June 15 - Creamy Mami, the Magic Angel: Long Goodbye (Japan)
- June 20 - Dot and the Koala (Australia)
- June 27 - We Called Them Montagues and Capulets (Bulgaria)
- July 5 - Karuizawa Syndrome (Japan)
- July 13:
  - The Adventures of Robin Hood (Australia)
  - Captain Tsubasa: Europe Daikessen (Japan)
  - Lupin III: Legend of the Gold of Babylon (Japan)
  - Night on the Galactic Railroad (Japan)
- July 20:
  - Area 88: The Movie (Japan)
  - Cosmo Police Justy (Japan)
  - Micro Commando Diatron 5 (Japan)
  - Robot King Sun Shark (South Korea)
- July 21 - Little Memole: Marielle's Jewelbox (Japan)
- July 22 - Penguin's Memory: Shiawase Monogatari (Japan)
- July 24 - The Black Cauldron (United States)
- July 26 - The Man in the Iron Mask (Australia)
- July 28 - Magical Princess Minky Momo – La Ronde in my Dream (Japan)
- July 29 - The Little Vagabond (Spain)
- August 5 - Dallos Special (Japan)
- August 10 - Odin: Photon Sailer Starlight (Japan)
- August 13 - Dokgo Tak 3 – The Mound Rediscovered (South Korea)
- August 21 - Armored Trooper Votoms: The Last Red Shoulder (Japan)
- August 25 - The Prince of Devil Island: The Three-Eyed One (Japan)
- September - The Pied Piper (Czechoslovakia)
- September 5 - Odyssea (Czechoslovakia and East Germany)
- September 24 - Urusei Yatsura: Ryoko's September Tea Party (Japan)
- October 1 - Pohádky pod sněhem (Czechoslovakia)
- October 6 - Bigfoot and the Muscle Machines (United States)
- October 19:
  - A Journey Through Fairyland (Japan)
  - The Robot Corps and Mecha 3 (United States and South Korea)
- October 20 - Molly and the Skywalkerz: Happily Ever After (United States)
- November 6 - You're a Good Man, Charlie Brown (United States)
- November 15 - Rainbow Brite and the Star Stealer (United States and France)
- November 22 - Starchaser: The Legend of Orin (United States and South Korea)
- November 25 - What's Michael? (Japan)
- December 11 - Asterix Versus Caesar (France and Belgium)
- December 14 - Peter-No-Tail in Americat (Sweden)
- December 15 - Angel's Egg (Japan)
- December 16:
  - Fire Tripper (Japan)
  - Love Position – The Legend of Halley (Japan)
- December 17:
  - 20,000 Leagues Under the Sea (Australia)
  - The Life & Adventures of Santa Claus (United States and Japan)
- December 20 - Dirty Pair: Affair of Nolandia (Japan)
- December 21:
  - Captain Tsubasa: Ayaushi, Zen Nippon Jr. (Japan)
  - Kinnikuman: Hour of Triumph! Justice Superman (Japan)
  - Mujeokcheorin lamboteu (South Korea)
  - The Snow Country Prince (Japan)
  - Vampire Hunter D (Japan)
- December 25 - He-Man & She-Ra: A Christmas Special (United States)
- Specific date unknown:
  - The Brave Frog's Greatest Adventure (United States and Japan)
  - Kalabaza tripontzia (Spain)
  - Mach and Sebestova – Come Up to the Blackboard! (Czechoslovakia)
  - The Monkey King Conquers the Demon (China)
  - Robby the Rascal (Japan)
  - The Secrets of a Wicker Bay (Poland)
  - Time Patrol (Japan)
  - Vampires in Havana (Cuba and Spain)

== Television debuts ==
- January 3 - The Little Green Man debuts on ITV.
- January 6 - Princess Sara debuts on Fuji TV.
- March 2 - Mobile Suit Zeta Gundam debuts on Nagoya TV, TV Asahi, Animax.
- March 4 - Robotech debuts in syndication, Sci-Fi Channel, Cartoon Network & KTEH.
- March 10 - High Step Jun debuts on TV Asahi.
- March 24 - Touch debuts on Fuji TV.
- March 30 - CBS Storybreak debuts on CBS.
- April 1 - Bertha debuts on BBC 1/BBC 2.
- April 2:
  - Onegai! Samia-don debuts on NHK.
  - Pro Golfer Saru debuts on TV Asahi.
- April 5 - Dancouga – Super Beast Machine God debuts on TBS.
- April 6 - Honō no Alpen Rose: Judy & Randy debuts on Fuji TV.
- April 8 - Hēi! Bumbū debuts on NHK.
- April 18 - Musashi no Ken debuts on TV Tokyo.
- June 7 - Magical Emi, the Magic Star debuts on NTV.
- July 4 - The Raccoons debuts on CBC.
- July 15 - Dirty Pair debuts on Nippon TV.
- September 2 - Galtar and the Golden Lance debuts in syndication, whilst She-Ra: Princess of Power has its world premiere on Children's ITV in the UK.
- September 6 - Yogi's Treasure Hunt debuts in syndication.
- September 7: Scooby's Mystery Funhouse, Star Wars: Droids, Star Wars: Ewoks,The 13 Ghosts of Scooby-Doo, and The Super Powers Team: Galactic Guardians debut on ABC.
- September 9:
  - Jayce and the Wheeled Warriors debuts on TF1 (France) and in syndication (United States).
  - She-Ra: Princess of Power and ThunderCats debut in syndication.
- September 14:
  - Adventures of the Gummi Bears debuts on NBC (1985–1989), ABC (1989–1990) and in syndication (1990–1991).
  - Hulk Hogan's Rock 'n' Wrestling, Little Muppet Monsters, The Berenstain Bears, and The Wuzzles debut on CBS.
  - It's Punky Brewster debuts on NBC.
  - Sectaurs and The Care Bears debut in syndication.
- September 15:
  - Paw Paws debuts in syndication.
  - The Funtastic World of Hanna-Barbera debuts on HBTV and TBS.
- September 24 - Spartakus and the Sun Beneath the Sea debuts on Antenne 2.
- September 25 - Fingermouse debuts on BBC1.
- September 30 - M.A.S.K. debuts in syndication.
- October 2 - Clémentine debuts on Antenne 2 (now France 2).
- October 3:
  - Seabert debuts on Antenne 2 & HBO.
  - Aoki Ryusei SPT Layzner debuts on Nippon Television.
- October 5 - Pob's Programme debuts on Channel 4.
- October 6:
  - Jem and Super Sunday debut in syndication.
  - Ninja Senshi Tobikage debuts on Nippon Television.
- October 12 - High School! Kimengumi debuts on Fuji TV.
- October 19 - Yume No Hoshi No Button Nose debuts on TV Asahi.
- October 26 - The World of David the Gnome debuts on TVE1.
- November 13 - Alias the Jester debuts on ITV Network (CITV).
- November 23 - Robo Story debuts on Canal+.
- November 25 - What's Michael? debuts on anime OVA.
- Specific date unknown:
  - Bigfoot and the Muscle Machines debuts on Super Sunday and Super Saturday.
  - Bojan the Bear debuts on TV Ljubljana 1 (1985–91) and TV Slovenia 1 (1991–99) (Slovenia), The Children's Channel (1988–94) (U.K.).
  - Captain Harlock and the Queen of 1000 Years debuts in syndication.
  - Fantadroms debuts on Latvijas Televīzija.

== Births ==
=== January ===
- January 12:
  - Danielle Judovits, American voice actress (voice of Cure March in Glitter Force, Tenten in Naruto, Naru Osaka in Sailor Moon, Kitty Pryde in Wolverine and the X-Men, Batgirl in The Batman, Big Patty in Hey Arnold!).
  - Issa Rae, American actress (voice of Spider-Woman in Spider-Man: Across the Spider-Verse, Dr. Indira in BoJack Horseman, Mother in Hair Love).
- January 22: Justin Hurwitz, American composer and television writer (The Simpsons).
- January 26: Arlyne Ramirez, American animator (Good Vibes, The Simpsons), storyboard artist (Cartoon Network Studios, The Simpsons), character designer (Pink Panther and Pals, Full English, The Ricky Gervais Show, Futurama, Clarence), prop designer (Clarence) and writer (Apple & Onion, Victor and Valentino).
- January 31: Rasmus Hardiker, English actor (voice of Philip in Thomas & Friends, Alfur Aldric in Hilda, Hansel in 101 Dalmatian Street, Ginger in The Queen's Corgi, Zebedee in Mary and the Witch's Flower, Prince Ivandoe in The Heroic Quest of the Valiant Prince Ivandoe).

=== February ===
- February 7: Tegan Moss, Canadian actress (voice of Penny in Gadget & the Gadgetinis, Vingette Valencia in My Little Pony: Equestria Girls – Rollercoaster of Friendship, Polly Pocket in the Polly Pocket franchise, Nolee in the My Scene franchise, Lady Zera in Shadow Raiders, Holly Jollimore in Casper's Haunted Christmas).
- February 9: David Gallagher, American actor (voice of Oliver in Rocket Power, Seiji Amasawa in Whisper of the Heart, Ben in The Wild Thornberrys).
- February 15: Natalie Morales, American actress and director (voice of Yolanda Buenaventura and Mindy Buenaventura in BoJack Horseman, Miss Calleros in Spider-Man: Into the Spider-Verse, Lois Lane in Harley Quinn, Betty DeVille in Rugrats).
- February 21: Anthony Raspanti, American former child actor (voiced himself in The Ren & Stimpy Show episode "A Visit to Anthony").

=== March ===
- March 1: Cole Sanchez, American artist, voice actor, writer, storyboard artist, director, and producer (Cartoon Network Studios).
- March 10: Cooper Andrews, American actor (voice of Aquaman in Aquaman: King of Atlantis, Kai Banks in Hailey's On It!).
- March 22: Justin Masterson, American former professional baseball starting pitcher (guest starred in the Fetch! with Ruff Ruffman episode "Take Me Out to the Fashion Show").
- March 24: Jeremy Zag, French animator, entrepreneur, producer, director, and composer (Zagtoon).
- March 25: Chris Redd, American actor and comedian (voice of Denny Jones and Chauncey in Saturday Morning All Star Hits!, Singe in the Sofia the First episode "The Royal Dragon", Hypnoslumber in the Star vs. the Forces of Evil episode "A Spell with No Name", Trevor McBride in The Simpsons episode "Girls Just Shauna Have Fun", additional voices in Big Mouth).
- March 26:
  - Jonathan Groff, American actor (voice of Kristoff in the Frozen franchise, Rick Sheridan in the Invincible episode "You Look Kinda Dead", Actor Playing Bart in The Simpsons episode "Bart's Not Dead").
  - Francesca Marie Smith, American actress and writer (voice of Helga Pataki in Hey Arnold!, the title character in Daisy-Head Mayzie, Emily Newton in Beethoven, Leslie McGroaty in The Itsy Bitsy Spider, Annie in The New Batman Adventures episode "Growing Pains").
- March 27: Blake McIver Ewing, American actor (voice of Menlo in Recess, Eugene Horowitz in season 5 of Hey Arnold!).

=== April ===
- April 1: Josh Zuckerman, American actor (voice of Pony in It's Pony, Rudy in The Tiger's Apprentice).
- April 3: Paula Rhodes, American actress (voice of Peaches Pie in Doc McStuffins, Skipper and Stacie in Barbie: Life in the Dreamhouse, young John Constantine in the Justice League Action episode "Trick or Threat").
- April 17: Joanne Spracklen, South African actress (voice of Supergirl in Justice League Action).
- April 19: Sabrina Jalees, Canadian comedian, actress, and writer (voice of Auntie Crane in Rubble & Crew, Nadia El-Khoury in Human Resources episode "Rutgers is for Lovers").
- April 22: Kristin Fairlie, Canadian actress (voice of the title character in Little Bear, Bridgette in Total Drama, Juliet Capulet in Peg + Cat).
- April 27: Jamie Gray Hyder, American actress (voice of Zethrid in Voltron: Legendary Defender, Shayera Hol in Green Lantern: Beware My Power).
- April 30: Gal Gadot, Israeli actress and model (voice of Shank in Ralph Breaks the Internet, herself in The Simpsons episode "Bart's Not Dead").

=== May ===
- May 6: Ian McGinty, American comic book artist and writer (Invader Zim, Adventure Time), (d. 2023).
- May 8: Yukiyo Fujii, Japanese actress (voice of Millianna in Fairy Tail, Sailor Saturn in season 3 of Sailor Moon Crystal, Mimi Pearlbaton in Re:Zero − Starting Life in Another World, Mana Inuyama in GeGeGe no Kitarō).
- May 16: Adriana Caldwell, Canadian actress (voice of Santi in Nina's World).
- May 25: Joe Anoaʻi, American pro wrestler (voiced himself in The Jetsons & WWE: Robo-WrestleMania!, Kizin in Elena of Avalor, Ramarilla in Rumble, Gene Zebraxton in Zootopia 2).
- May 27: Andrew Francis, Canadian actor (voice of Genki in Monster Rancher, Dende in Dragon Ball, Iceman in X-Men: Evolution, Shining Armor in My Little Pony: Friendship Is Magic, Gil in Johnny Test).
- May 31: Ellen Wong, Canadian actress (voice of Knives Chau in Scott Pilgrim Takes Off).

=== June ===
- June 2: Miyuki Sawashiro, Japanese voice actress (voice of Puchiko in Di Gi Charat, Mint Blancmanche in Galaxy Angel, Towa Akagi / Cure Scarlet in Go! Princess PreCure, Brunhild in Record of Ragnarok).
- June 8: Niki Yang, South Korean animator, writer, storyboard artist, and voice actress (Family Guy, Adventure Time, Gravity Falls).
- June 12:
  - Deneen Melody, American voice actress (voice of Zoé Lee, Kaalki, and Mullo in Miraculous: Tales of Ladybug & Cat Noir, Pandora in Re: Zero - Starting Life in Another World, Ronie Arabel and Laurannei Arabel in Sword Art Online).
  - Dave Franco, American actor (voice of Lloyd Garmadon in The Lego Ninjago Movie, Riddler in Young Justice, Wally in The Lego Movie, Alexi Brosepheno in the BoJack Horseman episode "Love And/Or Marriage", Broseidon in the Krapopolis episode "The Stuperbowl", Titus in Hoppers).
- June 13: Julia Pott, British animator and voice actress (creator of and voice of Susie McCallister in Summer Camp Island).
- June 15: Carolina Ravassa, Columbian actress (voice of Cleo Leball in Power Players, Zyanya in Onyx Equinox, Carolina Grant-Gomez in Hamster & Gretel).
- June 18: Alex Hirsch, American animator, storyboard artist, writer (The Marvelous Misadventures of Flapjack, Fish Hooks, Kid Cosmic), producer (Inside Job) and voice actor (voice of King and Hooty in The Owl House, Dirk in The Mitchells vs. the Machines, Wyatt in Big City Greens, Steve in The Angry Birds Movie 2, Clamantha, Fumble, and the Fish Police in Fish Hooks, Grassy Noel Atkinson, Paul Rudd, and Justin Timberlake in Inside Job, the Curator, Frog Soos and Schmebulock in the Amphibia episode "Wax Museum", Officer Concord in the Phineas and Ferb episode "Terrifying Tri-State Trilogy of Terror", Toby Matthews in the Rick and Morty episode "Big Trouble in Little Sanchez", Soosy Du in the Wander Over Yonder episode "The Cartoon", Ben Fotino in the Star vs. the Forces of Evil episode "Skooled!", Internet Troll in the We Bare Bears episode "Charlie's Halloween Thing 2", creator and voice of Grunkle Stan, Soos Ramirez, Bill Cipher, Old Man McGucket and other various characters in Gravity Falls).
- June 22: Lindsay Ridgeway, American actress (voice of young Sally in the Sonic the Hedgehog episode "Blast to the Past", singing voice of Darla Dimple in Cats Don't Dance).
- June 30: Cody Rhodes, American pro wrestler (voiced himself in Scooby-Doo! and WWE: Curse of the Speed Demon, The Jetsons & WWE: Robo-WrestleMania!, and Captain Laserhawk: A Blood Dragon Remix).

=== July ===
- July 2: Ashley Tisdale, American actress and singer (voice of Candace Flynn in Phineas and Ferb, Stealth Elf in Skylanders Academy).
- July 16:
  - Rosa Salazar, Canadian-American actress (voice of Roller Derby Girl in Epic, Barb in China, IL episode "Magical Pet", Ms. Benitez in Big Mouth, Vanessa in Win or Lose).
  - Yōko Hikasa, Japanese voice actress and singer (voice of Rias Gremory in High School DxD, Kyōko Kirigiri in the Danganronpa franchise).
- July 21: Vanessa Lengies, Canadian actress (voice of Annie Inch in The Little Lulu Show, Emily in Arthur, Kordi Freemaker in Lego Star Wars: The Freemaker Adventures).

=== August ===
- August 9: Anna Kendrick, American actress and singer (voice of Poppy in the Trolls franchise, Courtney Babcock in ParaNorman, Nora in the Family Guy episode "Internal Affairs").

=== September ===
- September 3: Shane Houghton, American comic book writer (Bongo Comics), writer (Harvey Beaks), producer and brother of Chris Houghton (co-creator of Big City Greens).
- September 4: Morgan Garrett, American voice actress (voice of Rico Brzenska in Attack on Titan, Megu Kataoka in Assassination Classroom).
- September 6: Lauren Lapkus, American actress (voice of Matilda in Penn Zero: Part-Time Hero, Patience St. Pim in Adventure Time, Mackenzie in Craig of the Creek, Lotta in Harvey Girls Forever!, Jennifer Sh'reyan in Star Trek: Lower Decks).
- September 10: Monica Lopera, American-Colombian actress (voice of Gabriela in Thomas & Friends, Sofia in The Adventures of Paddington).
- September 13:
  - Kenny Lucas, American writer, filmmaker, producer, actor, and comedian (Lucas Bros. Moving Co.).
  - Keith Lucas, American writer, filmmaker, producer, actor, and comedian (Lucas Bros. Moving Co.).
  - Vella Lovell, American actress (voice of Mermista in She-Ra and the Princesses of Power, Candle Fox in Kiff, Giganta in the My Adventures With Superman episode "All's Fair in Love and W.O.R.M.S.", Hostess in the Big City Greens episode "Short Wait").
- September 21: Doug Rockwell, American songwriter, producer, musician and composer (Blaze and the Monster Machines, The Loud House, The Casagrandes, voiced himself and Border Guard in The Loud House episodes "Really Loud Music" and "Schooled!").
- September 22: Tatiana Maslany, Canadian actress (voice of Queen Aja Tarron in the Tales of Arcadia franchise, Mia McKibbin in the BoJack Horseman episode "Let's Find Out", Barbie in the Robot Chicken episode "Hopefully Salt", Sherman in the Animals episode "Roachella").

=== October ===
- October 3: T.J. Hill, American composer (Disney Television Animation).
- October 10: Heather Hogan, American actress (voice of Phantom Girl in Legion of Super Heroes, second voice of Ducky in The Land Before Time franchise).
- October 11: Michelle Trachtenberg, American actress (voice of Valkyrie in The Super Hero Squad Show, Bar Girl in DC Showcase: Jonah Hex, Blood Moon in the SuperMansion episode "A Midsummer Night's Ream", Judy Reilly in Human Kind Of, Dr. Wagner in the Harriet the Spy episode "I Am the Onion"), (d. 2025).
- October 31: Kether Donohue, American actress (voice of Reiko Komori in The King of Braves GaoGaiGar, Shinohara in Piano: The Melody of a Young Girl's Heart, Kiki Benjamin/Mew Kiki in Mew Mew Power, Mirabelle Haywood in Magical DoReMi, Arine and Suzume Imamura in Munto 2: Beyond the Walls of Time, Emi Narasaki in Negadon: The Monster from Mars, Skuld in Ah! My Goddess, Lily in Kappa Mikey, Kuroki in Joe vs. Joe, Zoe Drake and Pterosaur in Dinosaur King, Autumn, Young Lila and Candice in Pokémon, Annie, Angela Raines and Nico in Yu-Gi-Oh! 5D's, Makana in Kurokami: The Animation, Brosalind and April in All Hail King Julien, Flo in Elena of Avalor, Gillian and Gennifer in Birdgirl, Chloe and Trench Woman in the American Dad! episode "The Long March", Ens. Peanut Hamper in the Star Trek: Lower Decks episode "No Small Parts", Sarah Connor and Party Store Vendor in the Robot Chicken episode "May Cause the Need for Speed", Tourist #2 in the Tuca & Bertie episode "Leveling Up").

=== November ===
- November 7: Lucas Neff, American actor (voice of Noodle Burger Boy in Big Hero 6: The Series, Duncan P. Anderson in Monsters at Work).
- November 18: Christian Siriano, American fashion designer (voiced himself in The Simpsons episode "Portrait of a Lackey on Fire").
- November 21: Ronny Chieng, Malaysian comedian and actor (voice of Seven in Scissor Seven, Pipa God in Wish Dragon, Johnny Zhao in Mulligan).
- November 23: Katie Crown, Canadian actress (voice of Izzy in Total Drama, Tulip in Storks, Ivy Sundew in Amphibia, Akila in Cleopatra in Space), and writer (Sanjay and Craig, Clarence, Bob's Burgers, Star vs. the Forces of Evil).
- November 26: Daron Nefcy, American animator, storyboard artist (Robot and Monster, Wander Over Yonder), character designer (Mad), writer, director (We the People) and producer (creator and voice of various characters in Star vs. the Forces of Evil).
- November 30:
  - Kaley Cuoco, American actress and producer (voice of Brandy Harrington in Brandy & Mr. Whiskers, the title character in Harley Quinn, Weather Vane in Loonatics Unleashed, Kirstee Smith in Bratz).
  - Chrissy Teigen, American actress (voice of Crystal in Hotel Transylvania 3: Summer Vacation, Hailey Posey in The Mitchells vs. the Machines, herself in The Simpsons episode "The Miseducation of Lisa Simpson").

=== December ===
- December 3: Amanda Seyfried, American actress (voice of Daphne Blake in Scoob!, Mary Bomba in Epic, Amy in the American Dad! episode "Escape from Pearl Bailey", Lori Spivak in The Simpsons episode "Frinkenstein's Monster").
- December 5:
  - Kyle McCarley, American actor (voice of Shigeo Kageyama in Mob Psycho 100, Mikazuki Augus in Mobile Suit Gundam: Iron-Blooded Orphans, Shinji Mato in Fate/stay night, Ryota Watari in Your Lie in April, Killy in Blame, Narancia Ghirga in JoJo's Bizarre Adventure: Vento Aureo, Joe Shimamura in Cyborg 009: Call of Justice, Helbram in The Seven Deadly Sins, Marc Anciel in Miraculous: Tales of Ladybug & Cat Noir).
  - Frankie Muniz, American actor, race car driver and musician (voice of Mosley Moville in Moville Mysteries, Willie, Augie and Tony in Fillmore!, Benjamin North in Choose Your Own Adventure: The Abominable Snowman, Thelonious in The Simpsons episode "Trilogy of Error", Frankie in the Clifford the Big Red Dog episode "Little Big Pup", himself in the Harley Quinn episode "Being Harley Quinn", first voice of Chester McBadbat in The Fairly OddParents).
- December 10: Raven-Symoné, American actress and musician (voice of Goldilocks, Zoe and Olivia in Happily Ever After: Fairy Tales for Every Child, Monique in Kim Possible, Maryanne Greene and Alexandria Quarry in Fillmore!, Marti Brewster in Everyone's Hero, Katie and Wife in American Dad!, Iridessa in Tinker Bell, Binkley in Animal Crackers, Valkyrie in Guardians of the Galaxy, Maria Media in Big City Greens, Stephanie in The Proud Family episode "Seven Days of Kwanzaa").

== Deaths ==
=== January ===
- January 19: Byington Ford, American cartoonist, theatrical director and businessman (director of the Animated Film Corporation in San Francisco), dies at age 94.
- January 25: Paul Smith, American composer (Walt Disney Animation Studios), dies at age 78.
- January 28: Don Raye, American songwriter (Walt Disney Animation Studios), dies at age 75.

=== February ===
- February 8: Marvin Miller, American actor (narrator in Gerald McBoing-Boing and Sleeping Beauty, voice of Mr. Sun in Our Mr. Sun, Hemo in Hemo the Magnificent, Aquaman in The Superman/Aquaman Hour of Adventure, Great Tree Chief and Master Kon in Fantastic Planet, Busby Birdwell in Fantastic Voyage, Super-Skrull in the Fantastic Four episode "Invasion of the Super-Skrull"), dies at age 71.
- February 20: Clarence Nash, American voice actor (voice of Donald Duck), dies at age 80.
- February 27: J. Pat O'Malley, British actor and singer (voice of Cyril Proudbottom and Winkie in The Adventures of Ichabod and Mr. Toad, Mother Oyster, The Walrus and the Carpenter and Tweedledum and Tweedledee in Alice in Wonderland, Jasper and the Colonel in 101 Dalmatians, the Cockney coster in Mary Poppins, and Colonel Hathi in The Jungle Book), dies at age 80.

=== March ===
- March 21: Michael Redgrave, British actor and director (narrator in A Christmas Carol), dies at age 77.
- March 24: Dick Kinney, American animator, screenwriter (Walter Lantz, Walt Disney Company, Terrytoons, Hanna-Barbera) and comics writer, dies at age 68.
- March 30: Harold Peary, American actor and comedian (voice of the Devil in the Private Snafu cartoon Hot Spot, Herman in The Roman Holidays, Fenwick Fuddy in The Galloping Ghost, and Yogi's Space Race, Big Ben in Rudolph's Shiny New Year and Rudolph and Frosty's Christmas in July), dies at age 76.

=== April ===
- April 5: Hannes Schroll, Austrian skier and yodeller (creator of the Goofy holler sound effect), dies at age 76.
- April 25: Richard Haydn, British actor (voice of the Caterpillar in Alice in Wonderland), dies at age 80.

=== May ===
- May 22: Wolfgang Reitherman, American animator and director (one of Disney's Nine Old Men), dies at age 75.

=== June ===
- June 20: Ralph A. Wolfe, American comic book artist and animator (Fleischer Studios, Warner Bros. Cartoons, Walt Disney Animation Studios), dies at age 90.

=== August ===
- August 2: Bob Holt, American actor (voice of the title character and Once-ler in The Lorax, Avatar in Wizards, the title characters in The Incredible Hulk and The Great Grape Ape Show, Shadow Demon in Dungeons & Dragons, Cop-Tur in Challenge of the GoBots), dies at age 56.
- August 25: Pino Zac, Italian illustrator, comics artist and animator, dies at age 55.
- August 29: Paul Kligman, Romanian-born Canadian actor (voice of J. Jonah Jameson in Spider-Man, Donner in Rudolph the Red-Nosed Reindeer, Friar Tuck in Rocket Robin Hood, Red Skull and Thunderbolt Ross in The Marvel Super Heroes), dies at age 62.

=== September ===
- September 3: Johnny Marks, American songwriter (Rudolph the Red-Nosed Reindeer), dies at age 85.

=== October ===
- October 10: Orson Welles, American film and theater director, and actor (narrator and voice of Nag and Chuchundra in Rikki-Tikki-Tavi, narrator in Bugs Bunny: Superstar, voice of Unicron in The Transformers: The Movie), dies at age 70.

=== November ===
- November 1: Wetzel Whitaker, American animator, film director, and film producer (Cinderella, Alice in Wonderland, Peter Pan), dies at age 77.
- November 6: Viktor Kálmán, Hungarian painter, animator and comics artist (Az Okos Kapus), dies at age 74.
- November 16: Lou Fleischer, American composer (Fleischer Studios) and actor (J. Wellington Wimpy in the Popeye cartoon I Wanna Be A Lifeguard), dies at age 94.
- November 29: Bill Scott, American actor (voice of Bullwinkle J. Moose, Mister Peabody, Dudley Do-Right, Super Chicken and George of the Jungle, Moosel in The Wuzzles, and Gruffi Gummi, Sir Tuxford, and Toadwart in Gummi Bears), dies at age 65 from a heart attack.

=== December ===
- December 19: Jean Ache, French animator and comics artist (L'Émule de Tartarin, Callisto le petite nymphe, Anatole Fait Du Camping), dies at age 62.
- December 23: Margie Hines, American actress (original voice of Betty Boop, occasional voice of Olive Oyl and Swee'Pea in Popeye), dies at age 76.
- December 25: Joe Oriolo, American film director, producer and writer (co-creator of Casper the Friendly Ghost and Felix the Cat, worked for Fleischer Studios and Famous Studios), dies at age 72.

=== Specific date unknown ===
- Antoine Payen, French animator and illustrator (Les Enfants du Ciel, Cri-Cri, Ludo et l'orage), dies at age 82 or 83.
- Roberto Sgrilli, Italian painter, illustrator, comics artist and animator (Il Barone di Münchhausen, Anacleto e la Faina), dies at age 87 or 88.

== See also ==
- 1985 in anime
