= 1985 in anime =

The events of 1985 in anime.

== Accolades ==
- Anime Grand Prix:
  - Best Work: Dirty Pair
  - Best Episode: episode 36 (Forever Four) of Mobile Suit Zeta Gundam
  - Best Male Character: Tatsuya Uesugi (voiced by Yūji Mitsuya) from Touch
  - Best Female Character: Four Murasame (voiced by Saeko Shimazu) from Mobile Suit Zeta Gundam
  - Best Voice Actor: Akira Kamiya
  - Best Voice Actress: Saeko Shimazu
  - Best Song: opening of Dirty Pair, Ro Ro Ro Russian roulette, sung by Meiko Nakahara
- Ōfuji Noburō Award: Night on the Galactic Railroad

== Releases ==
Released	Title	Type	Director	Studio	Ref
January 6	Princess Sarah	TV series	Fumio Kurokawa	Nippon Animation, Aniplex	
January 26	Urusei Yatsura 3: Remember My Love	Film	Kazuo Yamazaki	Studio Deen	
February 5	Area 88	OVA series	Hisayuki Toriumi	Studio Pierrot	
February 25	Kieta 12-nin	OVA film	Takeyuki Kanda	Nippon Sunrise	
March 1	Leda: The Fantastic Adventure of Yohko	OVA film	Kunihiko Yuyama	Kaname Production, Toho	
March 2	Mobile Suit Zeta Gundam	TV series	Yoshiyuki Tomino	Nippon Sunrise	
March 9	Megazone 23 - Part I	Film	Noboru Ishiguro	AIC, Artland, Tatsunoko	
March 16	Arei no Kagami	Film	Kozo Morishita	Toei Animation	
March 16	The Dagger of Kamui	Film	Rintaro	Madhouse	
March 16	Doraemon: Nobita's Little Star Wars	Film	Tsutomu Shibayama	Shin-Ei Animation	
March 16	GU GU Ganmo	Film		Toei Animation	
March 16	Little Memole	Film		Toei Animation	
March 16	Ninja Hattori-kun + Perman: Ninja Beast Jippō vs. Miracle Egg	Film	Masuji Harada	Shin-Ei Animation	
March 16	Seigi Choujin vs. Ancient Choujin	Film	Yasuo Yamayoshi	Toei Animation	
March 24	Touch	TV series	Hiroko Tokita	Group TAC, Studio Gallop	
March 28	Lovely Serenade	OVA film	Mochizuki Tomomichi	Studio Pierrot	
April 4	Dancouga – Super Beast Machine God	TV series	Seiji Okuda	Ashi Productions	
April 18	Musashi no Ken	TV series	Toshitaka Tsunoda	Eiken	
April 27	The Time Étranger	Film	Kunihiko Yuyama	Ashi Productions	
March 28	Long Goodbye	OVA film		Studio Pierrot	
April 1	Shin Obake no Q-tarō	TV series		Shin-Ei Animation	
April 2	Onegai! Samia-don	TV series	Osamu Kobayashi	Tōkyō Movie Shinsha	
April 8	Bumpety Boo	TV series		Nippon Animation	
April 8	Honō no Alpen Rose: Judy & Randy	TV series	Hideto Ueda	Tatsunoko	
April 13	Lunn Flies into the Wind	OVA film	Osama Tezuka	Tezuka Productions	
June 7	Magical Emi, the Magic Star	TV series	Takashi Anno	Studio Pierrot	
June 10	Dream Hunter Rem	OVA series	Seiji Okuda	Sai Enterprise, Zain	
June 15	Long Goodbye: Mahō no Tenshi Creamy Mami VS Mahō no Princess Minky Momo Gekijou no Daikessen	OVA film	Mochizuki Tomomichi	Studio Pierrot	
June 21	Chonoryoku Shōjo Barabanba	OVA film		Japan Home Video	
July 13	Captain Tsubasa: Europe Daikessen	Film	Isamu Imakake	Tsuchida Production	
July 13	Dr. Slump and Arale-chan: Hoyoyo! Dream Capital Mecha Police	Film	Toyoo Ashida, Kazuhisa Takenouchi	Toei Animation	
July 13	Legend of the Gold of Babylon	Film	Seijun Suzuki, Shigetsugu Yoshida	Tokyo Movie Shinsha	
July 13	Night on the Galactic Railroad	Film	Gisaburo Sugii	Group TAC	
July 15	Dirty Pair: The Original TV Series	TV series	Norio Kashima, Toshifumi Takizawa	Nippon Sunrise	
July 20	Area 88	Film	Hisayuki Toriumi	Project 88	
July 20	Cosmo Police Justy	OVA film	Motosuke Takahashi	Pierrot	
July 28	Magical Princess Minky Momo La Ronde in my Dream	OVA film	Hiroshi Watanabe	Ashi Productions	
August 10	Odin: Photon Sailer Starlight	Film	Eiichi Yamamoto, Takeshi Shirato, Toshio Masuda, Yoshinobu Nishioka	Toei Animation	
August 21	Armored Trooper VOTOMS: The Last Red Shoulder	OVA film	Ryosuke Takahashi	Nippon Sunrise	
August 25	Akumatō no Purinsu	TV film		Toei Animation	
September 21	The Chocolate Panic Picture Show	OVA film	Fujiwara Kamui	Tezuka Productions	
September 21	Genesis Climber MOSPEADA: Love Live Alive	OVA film	Katsuhisa Yamada	Artmic, Tatsunoko Productions	
September 21	"Kate no Kioku" Namida no Dakkai Sakusen!!	OVA film	Takeyuki Kanda	Nippon Sunrise	
September 21	Mujigen Hunter Fandora	OVA series	Kazuyuki Okaseko, Hiroshi Yoshida, Shigenori Kageyama	Hiro Media, Kaname Production	
September 24	Urusei Yatsura: Ryoko's September Tea Party	OVA film		Studio Deen	
October 3	Blue Comet SPT Layzner	TV series	Ryōsuke Takahashi	Nippon Sunrise	
October 6	Ninja Senshi Tobikage	TV series	Masami Annō	Studio Pierrot	
October 12	GeGeGe no Kitarō	TV series	Osamu Kasai, Hiroki Shibata	Toei Animation	
October 12	High School! Kimengumi	TV series	Hiroshi Fukutomi	Gallop, Studio Comet	
October 19	Dream-Star Button Nose	TV series	Masami Hata, Toshio Takeuchi, Katsuhisa Yamada, Kazuyuki Hirokawa	Sanrio, TV Asahi	
October 19	Fight! Iczer One	OVA series	Toshihiro Hirano	AIC	
October 19	A Journey Through Fairyland	Film	Masami Hata	Sanrio	
October 21	Chūhai Lemon LOVE 30S	OVA	Kenzo Koizumi	Tsuchida Productions, Wonder Kids	
November 23	Kimagure Orange Road: Shonen Jump Special	Film	Osamu Kobayashi, Tomomi Mochizuki	Shueisha, Studio Pierrot	
November 25	What's Michael?	OVA		Kitty Films	
December 15	Angel's Egg	OVA film	Mamoru Oshii	Studio DEEN, Tokuma Shoten	
December 16	Fire Tripper	OVA film	Osamu Uemura	Studio Pierrot	
December 21	Captain Tsubasa: Ayaushi, Zen Nippon Jr.	Film	Isamu Imakake	Tsuchida Production	
December 21	Cream Lemon Special: Ami Image White Shadow	OVA film			
December 21	Vampire Hunter D	OVA film	Toyoo Ashida	Ashi Productions	
December	Affair of Nolandia	OVA film	Masaharu Okuwaki	Nippon Sunrise	

== See also ==
- 1985 in animation
