= Remu (disambiguation) =

Remu may refer to:

- Remu Aaltonen (born 1948), a Finnish musician
- Remu Raitanen (born 1997), a Finnish basketball player
- Dream Hunter Rem (Japanese: Dorīmu Hantā Remu), a Japanese anime series
