= Mujigen Hunter Fandora =

Japanese original video animation

- Dimension Hunter Fandora
- Italian VHS cover of the first OVA

夢次元ハンター ファンドラ (Mujigen Hantā Fandora)
- Genre: Sci-fi
- Created by: Go Nagai
- Original video animation
- Directed by: Kazuyuki Okaseko (OVA 1); Hiroshi Yoshida (OVA 2); Shigenori Kageyama (OVA 3)
- Produced by: Akihiro Nagao
- Written by: Koichi Minade; Takashi Yamada
- Music by: Nozomi Aoki
- Studio: Kaname Production
- Released: September 21, 1985 – November 21, 1986
- Runtime: 35–46 minutes
- Episodes: 3
- Novel
- Written by: Koichi Minade; Go Nagai
- Illustrated by: Go Nagai
- Published by: Kodansha
- Published: February 19, 1986
- No. of pages: 222
- ISBN: 4-06-190049-8

Mujigen Hunter Fandora (夢次元ハンター ファンドラ, Mujigen Hantā Fandora; translated as Dream-Dimension Hunter Fandora) is an original video animation (OVA) created by manga artist Go Nagai. It was originally released on September 21, 1985, March 10, 1986 and November 21, 1986 by Nippon Columbia Co., Ltd.

Along with the OVA, a 222-page novel written by Koichi Minade and co-written and illustrated by Nagai was released on February 19, 1986 by Kodansha.

The OVAs were also released in Italy by Dynamic Italia with the title Dimension Hunter Fandora.

== Plot ==
The stars are a bounty hunter girl named Fandora and her shape-shifting assistant and guardian, Kwe, as they attempt to save the universe from the evil Yog-Sogoth (not to be confused with the Lovecraftian deity of a similar name). They encounter characters Gyaram, Captain PK, Sorta, Red-Eye Geran, Princess Reimia, GK, and Sorto. They travel through the Dream Dimension and hunt there. Fandora uses the power of the jewel Lupia in her crown to summon her powers and allows Kwe to transform into the Fantastic Dragon.

== Episodes ==
No.	Title	Length	Directed by	Original release date
1	"Lem Fight Chapter" "Lemu Faito Hen" (レム･ファイト編)	35 mins.	Kazuyuki Okaseko	September 21, 1985
2	"Deddlandar Chapter" "Deddo Landā Hen" (デッドランダー編)	43 mins.	Hiroshi Yoshida	March 10, 1986
3	"Fantos Chapter" "Fantosu Hen" (ファントス編)	46 mins.	Shigenori Kageyama	November 21, 1986

== Staff & production notes ==
- Distributor: Nippon Columbia Co., Ltd.
- Planning/Production: Hiro Media, Kaname Production
- General producer: Hiromasa Shibazaki
- Original work: Go Nagai
- Director: Kazuyuki Okaseko (OVA 1), Hiroshi Yoshida (OVA 2), Shigenori Kageyama (OVA 3)
- Scenario: Koichi Minade, Takashi Yamada
- Animation coordinator: Shigenori Kageyama (OVA 1, 2)
- Key animation director: Masahiro Shida (OVA 1), Masahiko Imai (OVA 2), Nobuyuki Ikegami (OVA 3)
- Animation: Kaname Production, Studio Giants (OVA 1, 2), Studio Eagle (OVA 1)
- Character design: Hideki Tamura (OVA 1), Mayumi Watanabe (OVA 2, 3), Hideko Yamauchi (OVA 3)
- Art director: Koichi Kudo (OVA 1), Geki Katsumata (OVA 2), Jiro Kono (OVA 3)
- Music: Nozomi Aoki
- Theme songs:
  - OVA 1
    - "Kokoro no Tobira" (心のとびら; translated as "Door of the heart") ending theme lyrics by Maki Kimura, composition by Maki Kimura, arrangement by Nozomi Aoki, song by Ushio Hashimoto
    - "Yume Hunter" (夢ハンター, yume hantā; translated as "Dream hunter"), lyrics by Alice Sato, composition by Maki Kimura, arrangement by Nozomi Aoki, song by Ushio Hashimoto
  - OVA 2
    - "Akuma no Mama de" (悪魔のままで), lyrics by Kazunori Sonobe, composition by Yuichiro Oda, arrangement by Kohei Tanaka, song by Ushio Hashimoto
    - "Akai Uchu" (赤い宇宙, Akai Uchū; translated as "Red space") ending theme, lyrics by Kazunori Sonobe, composition by Yuichiro Oda, arrangement by Kohei Tanaka, song by Ushio Hashimoto
  - OVA 3
    - "Sayonara wa Iwanai" (さよならは言わない) ending theme, lyrics by Rui Serizawa, composition by Yoshihiro Yonekura, arrangement by Kenji Yamamoto, song by Ushio Hashimoto
    - "Endless Way", lyrics by Rui Serizawa, composition by Yoshihiro Yonekura, arrangement by Kenji Yamamoto, song by Mitsuko Horie)
- Cast: Mitsuko Horie (Fandora), Akira Kamiya (Kwe), Makio Inoue (Yog-Sogoth), Keiko Toda (Leimia, OVA 1), Keiko Han (Fontine, OVA 2)

== Media ==
=== Home video ===
Besides the original VHS release, the OVA were released in Laserdisc, both individually and in a single package. The OVA were also released in a single DVD in March 17, 2001 by Columbia Music Entertainment (standard number COBM-5125).

=== Soundtracks ===
Each OVA had two vinyl records, an EP and an LP album, the first containing the song themes and the second the full background music and song themes. All of them were released by Columbia.

- OVA 1

Title	Artist	Standard number	Release date
Mujigen Hunter Fandora: Lem Fight Hen	Ushio Hashimoto	CH-125	1985-09-21
Mujigen Hunter Fandora: Lem Fight Hen - Ongaku Hen		CX-7239	1986-09-21

- OVA 2

Title	Artist	Standard number	Release date
Mujigen Hunter Fandora Part II: Dedd Landar Hen	Ushio Hashimoto	CH-126	1986-03-01
Mujigen Hunter Fandora Part II: Dead Lander Hen - Ongakushu		CX-7266	1986-03

- OVA 3

Title	Artist	Standard number	Release date
Mujigen Hunter Fandora Part III: Fantos Hen	Ushio Hashimoto; Mitsuko Horie	CH-132	1986-11
Mujigen Hunter Fandora Part III: Fantos Hen - Ongakushu		CX-7292	1986-11

=== Picture books ===
Besides the novel, two picture books of the first two OVA were released by Nihonbungeisha under the label Film Comics with ISBN 4-537-03005-4 and ISBN 4-537-03029-1 respectively.

=== Appearances in other media ===
The theme songs of the series are included in several CDs.

Title	Artist	Theme	Standard number	Release date
Horie Mitsuko Ota no Ayumi 6 ~Kyo Kara Ashita e no Zensokyoku~	Mitsuko Horie	Endless Way	COCC-9687/9	1992-03-21
Anime artist best selection: Hashimoto Ushio - Romantic Ageruyo	Ushio Hashimoto	Akuma no Mama de	COCC-10190	1992-09-21
Best & Best	Ushio Hashimoto	Akuma no Mama de	COCC-12818	1995-08-19
Nagai Go & Dynamic Pro no Sekai ~Shin Ongaku Hen~	Various	Kokoro no Tobira; Yume Hunter; Akuma no Mama de Akai Uchu; Sayonara wa Iwanai; Endless Way	COCC-15232/4	1998-06-20

== Merchandise ==
At the time of the OVA releases, several goods were available, including postcards, bags, cassette recorders, pencil cases, stationery, etc.

== Reception ==
The Encyclopedia of Science Fiction described Dream Dimension Hunter Fandora as a minor anime with occasional entertaining moments and animation that was adequate by the standards of its era, but criticized its underdeveloped story and weak characterization. It particularly faulted the second episode for its supposedly tragic but in practice uninteresting romantic subplot involving Sotho and his lover Fontaine. The encyclopedia also noted that, despite the series' frequent references to travel between dimensions, its narrative is essentially space opera with additional fantasy elements provided by the two magical jewels.

== See also ==
- Dream Hunter Rem, a similar OVA about a "dream hunter" released June 1985, months before Fandora
