= Vackor az első bében =

- Created by: István Kormos
- Written by: András Cseh
- Directed by: András Cseh; József Deák
- Narrated by: László Márkus
- Theme music composer: Zsolt Pethő
- Original language: Hungarian
- No. of seasons: 1
- No. of episodes: 11

Production
- Producer: István Sárosi
- Cinematography: András Cseh; Zsuzsa Radvány
- Editor: Hap Magda
- Running time: 6 minutes
- Production company: Pannónia Filmstúdió

Original release
- Network: Magyar Televízió, M1, M2, Duna TV

Vackor az első bében (English: Vackor in Grade 1B) is a Hungarian children's animated TV series from 1985. It was produced at Pannónia Filmstúdió.

== List of episodes ==
1. Egy piszén pisze kölyökmackó vigasságos napjairól
2. Első nap az első bében
3. Vackor elbeszéli szüleinek, hogy milyen az az első bé!
4. Vackor Csirió mókuskáról mesél a gyerekeknek
5. Zachár Zsófi megsúgja Vackornak, hogy van egy piros mackója
6. Vackor a táblánál, de csak tolmáccsal akar felelni
7. Vackor véletlen találkozása Vas Pistával és Kovács Vicuval
8. Maros Dorka elpanaszolja Vackornak, hogy az ő neve tulajdonképpen Szilvia
9. Vackor iskolát kerül, de rettenetesen megbánja
10. Marci bácsi arra tanítja Vackort, hogy az életet komolyan vegye
11. Vackor lovagi szolgálata Zachár Zsófi védelmében

Mokép published the series on a DVD, and later on MTVA in 2013 issued the digitally renewed version.
