= Koichi Kudo =

Japanese footballer and manager

Koichi Kudo 工藤 孝一
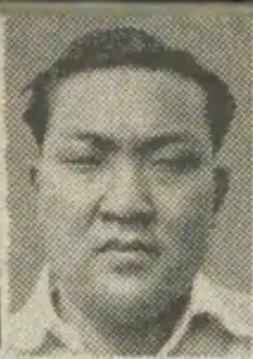
- Koichi Kudo, July 1936

Personal information
- Full name: Koichi Kudo
- Date of birth: February 4, 1909
- Place of birth: Iwate, Iwate, Empire of Japan
- Date of death: September 21, 1971 (aged 62)
- Place of death: Suginami, Tokyo, Japan
- Position: Goalkeeper

Youth career
- Years: Team
- 1927–1929: Waseda University High School
- 1930–1933: Waseda University

Managerial career
- 1942: Japan

Koichi Kudo (工藤 孝一, Kudo Koichi; February 4, 1909 – September 21, 1971) was a Japanese football player and manager. He managed Japan national team.

== Coaching career ==
Kudo was born in Iwate, Iwate on February 4, 1909. In 1933, he graduated from Waseda University and he became manager for Waseda University. In 1936, he became assistant coach for Japan national team for 1936 Summer Olympics in Berlin. Japan completed a come-from-behind victory against Sweden. The first victory in Olympics for the Japan and the historic victory over one of the powerhouses became later known as "Miracle of Berlin" (ベルリンの奇跡) in Japan. In 2016, this team was elected Japan Football Hall of Fame. In 1942, he became manager for Japan national team. In 1957, he managed Waseda University again until 1966.

On September 21, 1971, Kudo died of heart failure in Suginami, Tokyo at the age of 62.
