= List of The Berenstain Bears (1985 TV series) episodes =

The Berenstain Bears is an American animated comedy television series based on Stan and Jan Berenstain's Berenstain Bears children's book series, produced by The Joseph Cates Company and Southern Star/Hanna-Barbera Australia. It aired in the United States from September 14, 1985, until December 6, 1986, on CBS with 26 half-hour episodes (consisting of 52 11-minute stories) produced. Episode numbers and airdates were sourced from the United States Copyright Office.

== Series overview ==
Season	Episodes	Originally released	
Season	Episodes	First released	Last released
1	13	September 14, 1985	December 7, 1985
2	13	September 13, 1986	December 6, 1986

== Episodes ==
=== Season 1 (1985) ===
No. in season	Title	Written by	Original release date
1a	"Go Fly a Kite" (Note: This episode was adapted from the book series.)	Stan and Jan Berenstain	September 14, 1985
Brother and Sister want to enter the Kite Contest.
1b	"The Trojan Pumpkin"	Stan and Jan Berenstain	September 14, 1985
Papa gets a magic pumpkin seed that grows into a mutant pumpkin, but Brother and Sister discover it's a scheme by Weasel McGreed to take over Bear Country.
2a	"The Spooky Old Mansion"	Martin Pasko and Rebecca Parr	September 21, 1985
The whole bear family is terrified of a spooky mansion down the road. Mama explains that when she was a cub it was owned by a nice lady who was a friendly neighbor, but when she moved away no one else bought it and it fell into disrepair. Mama thinks about buying it to restore it to its former glory, but she needs Papa and the cubs to overcome their fears and superstitions.
2b	"The Fly Away Pizza"	Stan and Jan Berenstain	September 21, 1985
Papa enters a pizza-twirling competition and Weasel McGreed and Raffish Ralph decide to take advantage of this in order to take over Bear Country.
3a	"The Giant Bat Cave" (Note: This episode was part of the TV Teddy range where the titular teddy bear interacted with scenes and presenter in the video.)	Stan and Jan Berenstain	September 28, 1985
Raffish Ralph is planning to wreck Giant Bat Cave to build an amusement park, but Brother and Sister, with the help of a smart bat, are able to scare him away with the usage of a giant, fake bat.
3b	"The Wild Wild Honey"	Stan and Jan Berenstain	September 28, 1985
Papa tries to steal some of Queen Nectar's wild wild honey.
4a	"The Neighborly Skunk"	Stan and Jan Berenstain	October 5, 1985
A skunk moves in next door to the Bear family.
4b	"The Missing Pumpkin"	Rowby Goren	October 5, 1985
Farmer Ben's prize pumpkin goes missing, so the bear detective cubs decide to search for it.
5a	"Too Much Birthday"	Stan and Jan Berenstain	October 12, 1985
Sister's sixth birthday is coming up. The preparations for the party are bigger than Mama expected, including ponies and a merry-go-round Papa hired. The party is pretty distressing for Sister, but by the end of the party, she sees the advantage of growing up.
5b	"To the Rescue"	Earl Kress	October 12, 1985
The Bear Scouts Brother, Sister, and Cousin Freddy try to earn their merit badges. Papa tries to help, but his reckless and clumsy antics make him the one in need of rescuing. But, still, the scouts earn their badges eventually.
6a	"The Soccer Star"	Martin Pasko and Rebecca Parr	October 19, 1985
Brother tries out for the soccer team. Note: This is one of the few episodes where neither Mama nor Papa physically appear in.
6b	"Shoot the Rapids"	Rowby Goren	October 19, 1985
The Bear Scouts try to earn their whitewater merit badges.
7a	"Knight to Remember"	Stan and Jan Berenstain	October 26, 1985
The cubs find a cursed suit of armor. Note: This is one of a few episodes where neither Mama nor Papa physically appear in.
7b	"The Super Duper Bowl"	Rowby Goren	October 26, 1985
Raffish Ralph has a football scheme that involves holding a Super Duper Bowl.
8a	"The Not So Buried Treasure"	Bill Shinkai	November 2, 1985
The bears find a treasure map.
8b	"The Condemned Backscratcher"	Linda Woolverton	November 2, 1985
Raffish Ralph convinces the mayor to build a superhighway which threatens a Bear Country landmark.
9a	"Kong For a Day"	Bill Shinkai	November 9, 1985
Bigpaw is captured by Raffish Ralph and Weasel McGreed and exhibited. Note: Arch Weasel has a gruffer voice in this episode.
9b	"Blaze a Trail"	Linda Woolverton	November 9, 1985
Papa interferes with the cubs' scouting efforts.
10a	"No Girls Allowed"	Stan and Jan Berenstain	November 16, 1985
While viewing family memories, Sister gets angry that Brother outdid her. But today, Sister turns the tide on her fellows. In response, they exclude her from their clubhouse, so Papa decides to start a new clubhouse for celebration.
10b	"The Missing Dinosaur Bone"	Rowby Goren	November 16, 1985
In the Bearsonian Institute dinosaur exhibit, the skeleton is missing a right thigh bone. Sister, Brother, Cousin Freddy and Snuff are on the case with Papa's not so helpful assistance. Snuff turned out to be the thief to get a lick at the bone.
11a	"The Spookiest Pumpkin"	Rowby Goren	November 23, 1985
Papa is ambitious to win a pumpkin carving contest and Brother and Sister are also joining in. Papa is extremely secretive with his own pumpkin and guards it closely. Papa then has nightmares and he chooses to miss out on the contest.
11b	"The Dancing Bees"	Linda Woolverton	November 23, 1985
Papa buys from Raffish Ralph "The Secret of the Dancing Bees" book and dons on a bee costume in hopes of extracting Queen Nectar's honey. His plan works and humours the bees but when Ralph tries it, the bees are not impressed.
12a	"Learn About Strangers"	Stan and Jan Berenstain	November 30, 1985
During their outdoor playtime, Sister is in the habit of talking to people she doesn't know. Papa's warnings about stranger danger scare her, but Mama coaxes her that this isn't all true.
12b	"The Disappearing Honey"	Rowby Goren	November 30, 1985
With Papa's honey supply missing, Brother, Sister, Cousin Freddy and his dog Snuff do detective work, while Papa does his ineffective searching. It turns out Papa took and ate the honey in his sleep.
13a	"In the Dark"	Stan and Jan Berenstain	December 7, 1985
Brother reads a scary book called The Case of the Crying Cave to Sister. Sister gets the creeps in bed. Mama tries to help leaving the light on for Sister, which causes inconvenience for Brother. Papa shows Sister how to overcome her fear in the attic.
13b	"Ring the Bell"	Stan and Jan Berenstain	December 7, 1985
The Bear family are entering contests at the fair. When faced by Too Tall Grizzly, Brother's quarrel leads Papa into a challenge against Two-Ton. Meanwhile, Queen Nectar has a vendetta against Papa for honey theft, but they unwittingly help Papa win the strength competition.

=== Season 2 (1986) ===
No. in season	Title	Written by	Original release date
14a	"The Messy Room"	Stan and Jan Berenstain	September 13, 1986
Mama tries to get the cubs to give their messy room a complete cleanup within a 15-minute time limit. Failing to do so, she tries to throw away their stuff, but Papa stops her and he has a better idea.
14b	"The Terrible Termite"	Stan and Jan Berenstain	September 13, 1986
Raffish Ralph meets the Terrible Termite (who can eat wood in seconds) and decides to use him to threaten people who do not buy his "termite insurance". However, when the Termite realizes he is being used he refuses to serve Ralph anymore, and Brother and Sister free the termite into threatening Ralph's houseboat unless he retires from the insurance business.
15a	"Forget Their Manners"	Rowby Goren	September 20, 1986
After being pushed around at Cousin Freddy's party by Too Tall, Brother and Sister develop their own bad habits. Mama puts some discipline on the family to improve their manners, which are put to practice even outside the house.
15b	"The Wicked Weasel Spell"	Stan and Jan Berenstain	September 20, 1986
Brother, Sister and Freddy have a hunch the weasels are up to something. Sure enough, Weasel McGreed intends to hypnotise Bigpaw to turn against Bear Country, but Brother, Sister and Freddy thwart their plan.
16a	"The Truth"	Stan and Jan Berenstain	September 27, 1986
Brother has quite a passion for soccer and won't join in other activities with Sister. When they begin to fight, they accidentally break Mama's favorite lamp. They tell fibs about how it broke, but Mama tells them the importance of telling the truth.
16b	"Save the Bees"	Stan and Jan Berenstain	September 27, 1986
Weasel McGreed creates a new flower which traps bees to cut off Bear Country's honey supply. Raffish Ralph tricks Mama into planting the flowers. Brother and Sister catch wind of the plot and a meeting to save the bees ensues. Only a skunk's stink gas can wilt the flowers.
17a	"Get in a Fight"	Stan and Jan Berenstain	October 4, 1986
Papa is not in a good mood this morning. The next day, Brother is in a rotten mood with Sister and they both refuse to play with each other and bicker. The fight intensifies with even Papa getting involved until Mama shows them the pointlessness of quarrelling.
17b	"The Bigpaw Problem"	Bill Shinkai	October 4, 1986
Bigpaw comes to Beartown, but his uncontrollable strength causes major tremors. Raffish Ralph sees this as a chance to turn everyone against Bigpaw and ultimately have him banished. Weasel McGreed ignores Ralph, which proves his undoing as he and the weasels are plotting their own tremors to cause a major earthquake and evacuate Bear Country. However, Bigpaw repels the earthquake with his strength and is allowed to live in Beartown.
18a	"Get Stage Fright"	Stan and Jan Berenstain	October 11, 1986
Sister is going to take part in the school play, Grizzlystiltskin, but she is nervous about being the main role especially on stage. With a little encouragement from Mama, she overcomes her problems and performs well and also takes pity on Brother who forgets his lines.
18b	"Go Bonkers over Honkers"	Rowby Goren	October 11, 1986
Raffish Ralph seizes an opportunity to trade Bigpaw some pet geese for a gold rock. After the geese cause trouble and good help, Bigpaw shortly has to return them to their mother.
19a	"The Great Honey Pipeline"	Linda Woolverton	October 18, 1986
After some convincing from Brother and Sister, Papa promises not to go after Wild Wild Honey anymore. But when Queen Nectar's honey supply goes missing, the Bear Detectives find Papa broke his word, so they recover the honey and give Papa a lesson he'll never forget. Note: This episode is a flashback episode when Brother and Sister remember what Papa did in the past. It features flashback footage from The Wild Wild Honey and The Dancing Bees.
19b	"The Great Grizzly Comet"	Stan and Jan Berenstain	October 18, 1986
The Great Grizzly Comet is passing. Some "little green bears" arrive with a warning that the comet is on a collision course with Bear Country. Papa tells Farmer Ben, who both spread the alarm to evacuate Bear Country. Actual Factual attempts to assure everyone that all is well until the flying saucer appears in the town square. Sister and Brother realize the entire warning is cooked up by Archweasel McGreed and Raffish Ralph to evacuate Bear Country in order to get the bears to abandon their homes and businesses, to which Raffish Ralph can legally take over. Bigpaw later stops the weasels and smashes the flying saucer. That night, everyone is amazed by Grizzly's Comet, which passes through without danger.
20a	"The Sure-Fire Bait"	Stan and Jan Berenstain	October 25, 1986
Papa is determined to catch Old Jake the catfish.
20b	"The Cat's Meow"	Rowby Goren	October 25, 1986
Brother and Sister Bear are going to babysit Honey Bear's cat, Puff, while she's away on a trip with her family. Puff's unique meow leads the Berenstain Bears on a quest to figure out why it is the cat meows. Note: Grizzly Gramps is voiced by Brian Cummings instead of Frank Welker in this episode.
21a	"The Trouble with Friends"	Stan and Jan Berenstain	November 1, 1986
Sister wants some friends her age just like Brother. Just then, the Bruin family move in next door and Sister befriends Lizzy Bruin. Lizzy's bossy behavior soon makes the two of them split, but they quickly get together since there are more things they can't do by themselves. Note: This is the only appearance of Lizzy Bruin in this 1985 series.
21b	"The Coughing Catfish"	Bill Shinkai	November 1, 1986
Jake the giant Catfish, among other animals are affected by garbage dumping in the lake. Brother and Sister get help from Professor Actual Factual to scan the extensive garbage pollution. Their solution is to use a sunken pirate ship as an attraction to fund cleanup projects.
22a	"The Substitute Teacher"	Rowby Goren	November 8, 1986
Brother, Cousin Freddy, and Too-Tall and his gang set up practical jokes for a substitute teacher, but they learn to like her when they realize what she is like.
22b	"The Mansion Mystery"	Rowby Goren	November 8, 1986
The cubs investigate a mysterious mansion.
23a	"Bust a Ghost"	Linda Woolverton	November 15, 1986
The Bear Scouts have ghost troubles.
23b	"The Ice Monster"	Rowby Goren	November 15, 1986
The ice carnival is starting soon. Suddenly Raffish Ralph spots an ice monster. The ice monster is revealed to be a sleepwalking Bigpaw, who decides to skip his hibernation and join in the fun. Note: This was Bigpaw’s last appearance in both the show and other Berenstain Bears-related animated media.
24a	"The Crystal Ball Caper"	Stan and Jan Berenstain	November 22, 1986
Gran's future-predicting crystal ball goes missing.
24b	"The Raid on Fort Grizzly"	Stan and Jan Berenstain	November 22, 1986
Raffish Ralph and Weasel McGreed plan to steal from the Fort Grizzly treasury.
25a	"The Forbidden Cave"	Bill Shinkai	November 29, 1986
The Bear Scouts are trapped in Forbidden Cave.
25b	"The Hot Air Election"	Linda Woolverton	November 29, 1986
Raffish Ralph convinces Papa to run for public office, sparking a fiery election.
26a	"Life with Papa"	Rowby Goren	December 6, 1986
Mama entrusts Papa to look after the cubs and the house while she goes to visit Cousin Min. Brother and Sister do their best to keep Papa out of trouble, but he manages to make a combined mess in the house, but Mr. Skunk comes to help out and tidy up before Mama comes back. Note: This is the last episode where Mama and Papa Bear physically appear in.
26b	"Save the Farm"	Bill Shinkai	December 6, 1986
Weasel McGreed is planning to buy Farmer Ben's farm to make it his new headquarters, but he refuses to sell. Note: Mama and Papa Bear have disappeared in the episode finale. In addition, Brother and Sister Bear are the only characters to appear in the episode finale. This episode was also the last episode and piece of animated Berenstain Bears-related media that both Raffish Ralph and Arch Weasel McGreed appeared in.
