= List of Princess Sara episodes =

Princess Sara is a 1985 Japanese television series based on Frances Hodgson Burnett's 1905 children's novel, A Little Princess. The series was produced by Nippon Animation under the direction of Fumio Kurokawa, and its scriptwriter was Ryūzō Nakanishi. Princess Sara premiered on 6 January 1985 on Fuji Television. The 46-episode series was the 11th of Nippon Animation's World Masterpiece Theater.

== Episodes ==
No.	Title	Original release date
1	"Miss Minchin's Seminary for Young Ladies"; Transliteration: "Minchin Joshi Gakuin" (Japanese: ミンチン女子学院)	6 January 1985
Solicitor Barrow discusses the beautiful Sara's childhood with Headmistress Minchin. Sara is acclimating herself to London after a long voyage from India with her father, Captain Ralph Crewe. While the headmistress, her sister Amelia Minchin and Barrow discuss Sara's living arrangements at the seminary and decide if she is a suitable student, Sara's carriage ride is the backdrop for her book knowledge of London. When they arrive at the seminary, Sara, Peter and the headmistress argue about the latter's questions about Sara. The headmistress's anger with Peter disappears when Sara is enthralled with a pony and defends Peter for driving the carriage to the seminary. Although the conflict has a resolution, it sows the seeds for the headmistress's dislike of Sara.
2	"A Wonderful Gift"; Transliteration: "Emirī Ningyō" (Japanese: エミリー人形)	13 January 1985
Sara's enrollment contract is now in force, and her belongings are scheduled to arrive at the Seminary with a London wardrobe bankrolled by her father. She wants to create some happy memories before Ralph returns to India. After visiting St. Paul's Cathedral, Sara wants a doll and leads Ralph on a shopping expedition through London. Peter, shivering in the cold, must move the carriage to avoid parking illegally. Sara finds the doll she wants, and persuades the reluctant storekeeper to sell it to them. The students speculate about Sara as her belongings are delivered to the Seminary and Jessie and Gertrude move them in. The Headmistress tells her sister that Sara is a spoiled, problem child. Settled at the Seminary, Sara contemplates being away from her father for the first time. Although the Headmistress is pleased that Sara is coping with her father's departure, the girl is on the verge of tears.
3	"First Day of Class"; Transliteration: "Hajimete no jugyō" (Japanese: はじめての授業)	20 January 1985
Sara watches Ralph depart for India, and cries herself to sleep on her first night. She awakens to a beautiful winter scene outside her window and her maid, Mariette, helps her prepare for her first day of class. Lavinia Herbert is upset at the prospect of getting into trouble with the Headmistress because of her three roommates (including Jessie and Gertrude). While Sara has breakfast in her room, a typical breakfast scene unfolds in the dining room downstairs. Lavinia is annoyed with Lottie Lei and Ermengarde St. John, especially when Ermengarde makes a clumsy mistake for which the Headmistress scolds her. The Seminary house cat Cesar greets Sara in the Headmistress's office, where the Seminary's rules are explained and she receives a French textbook. Lavinia shows Sara to her seat, and the other girls are astonished at her size. The Headmistress introduces her and describes her voyage. Lavinia introduces the other students and describes the Headmistress's past behavior; this shocks the Headmistress, and begins her vendetta against Sara.
4	"Ermengarde the Good Friend"; Transliteration: "Shin'yu Āmengādo" (Japanese: 親友アーメンガード)	27 January 1985
Sara settles into life at the Seminary, unaware of the Headmistress's antipathy towards her. Ermengarde St. John has trouble in French class, despite Sara's attempted help, and Lavinia leads Jessie and Gertrude in ridiculing her after class until Sara stops them. Lavinia begins planning her revenge. Sara sticks up for Ermengarde, who admits her lack of self-confidence. Now good friends, they want to visit Ermengarde's Aunt Eliza but the Headmistress's consent is required to leave the Seminary. Amelia is sympathetic to Ermengarde's predicament and explains to Sara that they must return before dusk (which Sara forgets). Sara and Ermengarde visit Aunt Eliza, and are astounded to find the Headmistress in a fury when they return.
5	"Lottie the Little Sweetheart"; Transliteration: "Nakimushi Rotti" (Japanese: 泣き虫ロッティ)	3 February 1985
Lavinia Herbert has been class representative at the Seminary for a long time, and the Headmistress has not cared how well she was doing the job. As the students go to church, Lottie focuses on how well-dressed they are instead of their spiritual development. Lavinia leads the girls to church, and is rough on Lottie. Sara suspects that there is a problem when Lottie runs and hides from the Headmistress's harsh reaction. The Headmistress decides whether Lottie will return to the Seminary, and Lottie throws a temper tantrum that even tries Amelia's patience. When Lottie hits her head on the floor, Sara learns that Lottie has no memories of her mother and becomes very fond of Lottie.
6	"Becky, Covered in Ash"; Transliteration: "Hai-kaburi Bekkī" (Japanese: 灰かぶりベッキー)	10 February 1985
The Headmistress reads the letters written by the students and has them sealed and mailed. Amelia suggests that Sara help with the errand, allowing Lottie to accompany Sara. Sara meets an illiterate girl, Becky, who is looking for the head of Miss Minchin's Select Seminary for Young Ladies. The Headmistress is disgusted with Becky's presence in her office, and she tells Amelia to summon the head maid Molly. The Headmistress tells Sara that she dislikes servants, and reprimands Amelia for involving Sara in her subterfuge. She is contemptuous of Becky, not allowing her to settle in before beginning work at the Seminary. James introduces himself while Molly tells Becky to deliver coal and do other chores she does not know how to do. Cesar trips Becky, and the coal flies everywhere. Sara prevents Becky from being fired, and Becky goes home with orders to get up early and light the fire; Becky being fired may be the lesser of two problems.
7	"Class Representative"; Transliteration: "Daihyō Seito" (Japanese: 代表生徒)	17 February 1985
Peter arrives to find Becky cleaning the front steps early one Sunday morning. The Headmistress encourages Sara to lead the girls to the cathedral past the mayor and her VIP entourage, and they accidentally trample Becky. The Headmistress appoints Sara class representative to make Lavinia jealous. Sara plays along (to the mayor's delight), and Lavinia plots her revenge. The Headmistress gives everyone the rest of the day off. Sara brings out a pony, for everyone to enjoy and Lavinia has her revenge when the pony gallops off in a panic.
8	"A Kind Mistress"; Transliteration: "Shinsetsu-na Ojōsama" (Japanese: 親切なお嬢様)	24 February 1985
Usually at her older sister's beck and call, Amelia Minchin is a patient teacher and takes Lottie and Ermengarde's errors in stride while leading the girls through a dance exercise in which Sara excels. Her comparison of Ermengarde to Sara prompts nasty remarks from Lavinia. When Sara notices that Becky is quiet, Mariette explains the Seminary's rule against student servant fraternization and says that Becky is working hard. Lavinia resents Sara's superiority, and Becky dozes off while cleaning Sara's room. Awakening to find Sara looking fondly at her, Becky realizes that what defines a princess is how she behaves toward other people rather than what she has and Sara is well on her way to becoming a princess.
9	"The Letter from India"; Transliteration: "Indo Kara-no Tegami" (Japanese: インドからの手紙)	3 March 1985
After chastising Lavinia for upsetting Lottie, Sara plans a tea party to befriend everyone at the Seminary. Out with Ermengarde to buy provisions for the party, she makes a point of including Becky. Jessie and Gertrude, glad that Sara is not snubbing them, tell her what they really think of Lavinia. Lavinia recognizes the Headmistress's greed, and her complaining chills the party; however, the Headmistress is delighted to learn that Sara's father has invested in possibly lucrative diamond mines which are expected to provide for Sara well into adulthood. To Sara, though, the diamond mines are little different from gambling in a casino.
10	"Two Gifts"; Transliteration: "Futatsu no purezento" (Japanese: 二つのプレゼント)	10 March 1985
Lottie asks Sara to describe where in India her father's diamond mines are located, and Lavinia interjects a snide but pragmatic remark. The Headmistress tells Amelia that she is going to confirm the diamond-mine rumors with Solicitor Barrow. Greedy and giddy, she announces Sara's upcoming birthday and takes her shopping despite the shopkeeper reminder that Sara must agree to any purchases.
11	"The Birthday of the Princess"; Transliteration: "Purinsesu no Tanjō-bi" (Japanese: プリンセスの誕生日)	17 March 1985
Peter's excitement and the Seminary's festive atmosphere before Sara's ninth birthday annoy Lavinia, and Sara agrees that it is excessive. The party begins, with Peter and Becky bringing in an intricately-detailed dollhouse. Sara insists that they stay, and Solicitor Barrow tells the Headmistress about Ralph Crewe's impoverished death in Becky's earshot. The Headmistress, taking her anger out on Becky for overhearing, crashes the party with the news of Ralph's death and orders Sara to leave the Seminary immediately; Mr. Barrow decides to take everything away from her.
12	"The Dark Room in the Attic"; Transliteration: "Yaneura-no Kurai Heya" (Japanese: 屋根裏の暗い部屋)	24 March 1985
While Sara prepares to leave the Seminary, the Headmistress breaks up the party and accompanies Mr. Barrow to inventory Sara's possessions. Mr. Barrow advises her not to be so harsh, and they plan for Sara to become a maid to work off her financial obligations. When Mr. Barrow leaves, the Headmistress storms upstairs to take back the dress Sara is wearing and throws Peter out. Sara takes a last look at her old room before going to the Headmistress's office. Thanks to Mr. Barrow's advice, the Headmistress puts Sara to work in the kitchen and provides her with a room in the attic.
13	"A Day of Hard Work"; Transliteration: "Tsurai Shigoto no Hi" (Japanese: つらい仕事の日)	31 March 1985
Sara is worried of an intruder who turns out to be a distraught Becky bringing her a few things from the party. Grateful for her friendship, Sara reminds Becky that they are alike regardless of where they grew up; Becky tells her what to expect as a servant, promising to help her. Sara awakens to a beautiful morning in which her former possessions are carted away and her former maid, Mariette, is ordered off the premises by the Headmistress. Downstairs, Molly tells her what to do; while waiting for the classroom to empty, Sara misses her student days. Cleaning the classroom strengthens Sara's resolve to finish her education despite the Headmistress's hostility.
14	"The Late-Night Guest"; Transliteration: "Shin'ya no Okyaku-sama" (Japanese: 深夜のお客さま)	7 April 1985
Although she is adapting, Sara is still out of her league; although Becky helps, her status astonishes Ermengarde and Lottie. Lavinia leads Jessie and Gertrude in bullying Sara, unnerving and intimidating the other students. Later that evening, Lavinia-tachi's (Lavinia, Jessie and Gertrude) meanness drives Ermengarde up to the attic. After studying at night, Sara finds Ermengarde waiting for her. They talk, and Ermengarde must then return to bed past the sleeping Headmistress.
15	"Peter, The Child of the Streets"; Transliteration: "Machi no ko Pītā" (Japanese: 街の子ピーター)	14 April 1985
After falling asleep while reading in bed, Sara plays the recorder Peter gave her and watches the sparrows eat. She awkwardly scrubs the front porch as her former classmates prepare for church, and Lavinia's farewell makes them long for the good old days. The Headmistress forbids her from going to church, and James sends her shopping to Covent Garden. The route is a reminder of her former life with her father, especially when she is robbed. Peter helps Sara with the shopping, which may ultimately backfire on her.
16	"Lottie's Adventure"; Transliteration: "Rotti no bōken" (Japanese: ロッティの冒険)	21 April 1985
Although Sara is sent shopping daily by Molly and James, Molly criticizes her about cleaning the students' rooms. Everyone is rushing to class when Sara and Becky go upstairs; Lottie misplaces her book, which annoys Lavinia. Sara is unable to intercede with the arrival of the angry Headmistress, who tells her to stay away from the students. Lottie gets more confused thanks to Jessie and Gertrude, deliberately destroys her artwork and has a nightmare that night. Cesar leads Lottie to the attic, where her panic brings Sara running to the rescue. They spend the night feeding the rats and the birds, and have a beautiful view of the city at dawn.
17	"Friends with Little Melle's Family"; Transliteration: "Chīsana tomo Meru no kazoku" (Japanese: 小さな友メルの家族)	28 April 1985
Molly and James are taskmasters to Sara in accordance with the Headmistress's orders; fortunately for her, they appreciate a job well done. They loathe the idea of Sara scavenging for scraps of food, but Becky keeps her supplied and Sara befriends an attic rat whom she names Melle. Sara, first puzzled by Melle's caution, learns why when Ermengarde visits her (conquering her fear of rats) and Lavinia and Gertrude betray them. Becky explains that Ermengarde's silence about why she took the scrap of bread is ultimately protecting Sara, since exterminating the rats would requires a lengthy investigation.
18	"The Sad Maypole Celebration"; Transliteration: "Kanashī meipōru-sai" (Japanese: 悲しいメイポール祭)	5 May 1985
Becky and Peter help Sara cope with the Headmistress and Lavinia but Sara must still work hard to prepare for the festivities. Hungry, she must make a large shopping trip without Peter. Donald, a compassionate boy, helps Sara by giving her sixpence to buy something to eat.
19	"Messages to India"; Transliteration: "Indo kara no yobigoe" (Japanese: インドからの呼び声)	12 May 1985
The Headmistress finds the letters which Sara had received from her father, and Becky commiserates with her. During a shopping trip with Solicitor Barrow, he tells her the details of Ralph's final days and penniless death. Peter helps Sara post a letter to the Bombay police on a ship with a sympathetic captain. Molly complains about the length of time Sara was out, and says she will get no supper that evening.
20	"The Mystery of the Resident of the Special Room"; Transliteration: "Nazo no tokubetsu-shitsu seito" (Japanese: 謎の特別室生徒)	19 May 1985
As if instructed by the Headmistress, Lavinia angrily throws her boots at Becky with orders to have them polished by Sara; Ermengarde protests, indicating that Lavinia's power base is beginning to crumble. Molly tells Sara and Becky to prepare a special room for a new resident; while shopping for the new resident's special meal, Sara learns that the resident is Lavinia (again the Headmistress's favorite student). Lavinia's parents have more honor than their daughter does, and the Headmistress ponders her behavior toward Sara.
21	"The Sadness Within Tears"; Transliteration: "Namida no naka no kanashimi" (Japanese: 涙の中の悲しみ)	26 May 1985
Sara learns that Lavinia and the Headmistress have not learned a lesson when a distraught Becky tells her about a recent confrontation with the former, who continues to treat Sara as her maid. The Headmistress berates Molly and James for not breaking Sara's spirit, and they retaliate with back-to-back shopping trips (the second day in the rain, when her shoe is run over by a coach). Carrying her damaged shoe and helped by a soldier, Sara is told by Molly and James that she and Becky must eat the sprouted potatoes.
22	"The Party in the Attic"; Transliteration: "Yaneura no Pātī" (Japanese: 屋根裏のパーティー)	2 June 1985
Amelia leaves on family business. Ermengarde and Lottie plan to bring Sara food when she is again denied supper. Sara works with Becky, who tells her to go to bed. Although Ermengarde pays her a late-night visit, the Headmistress intercepts Becky and confiscates a meat pie (from Ermengarde's aunt) meant for Sara. When the three girls are having fun, Lavinia turns them in to the vindictive Headmistress.
23	"The Friendly Baker"; Transliteration: "Shinsetsuna Pan'ya-san" (Japanese: 親切なパン屋さん)	9 June 1985
Sara awakens one rainy morning to Becky suggesting that they search for leftover food to get them through the workday, but they are caught by Molly. Sara does not realize that the Headmistress is angry because Lottie told her about Lavinia, Jessie and Gertrude's prank. Tasked with a retaliatory rainy-day mail run, Sara finds a fourpence coin in front of a bakery and the baker encourages her to buy some bread. After mailing the Headmistress's letter and being told by a priest that it is all right to think about oneself, Sara goes to the bakery and sees a street urchin far worse off than she. Sara's intercession inspires the baker to offer the urchin shelter, but she and Becky again go hungry back at the Seminary.
24	"Lavinia's Special Day"; Transliteration: "Emirī no unmei" (Japanese: エミリーの運命)	16 June 1985
Lavinia is allowed by the Headmistress to be especially rude to Sara as a birthday present. Sara follows Lavinia upstairs, and talks to her to determine where she stands. The party room is readied, and Sara escorts Lavinia. Lottie and Ermengarde are forced to give presents, and Lavinia wants Sara at the party to acquire her doll. The students rally behind Sara, who keeps the doll as Lavinia is revealed as the class tyrant. Sara is encouraged to keep studying by Sensei Dufarge.
25	"Cinderella for a Day"; Transliteration: "Ichinichi dake no Shinderera" (Japanese: 一日だけのシンデレラ)	23 June 1985
A bookworm, Sara is dismayed to fall asleep while reading Sensei Dufarge's French book. While she prepares for the workday, the Headmistress tells the students that she is going to exhibit them to the mayor (who wants to see Sara) and her VIP entourage and asks them not to disgrace the Seminary. The Headmistress does not want it known that she makes servants of students with family problems, and Sensei Dufarge suggests temporarily appointing Sara the class representative. Amelia discovers that Lavinia has the class cowed into refusing to cooperate until Lottie and Ermengarde break ranks. Sara's proficiency in French, demonstrated when she recites a poem from memory, impresses the mayor into aiding the Seminary but again annoys the Headmistress.
26	"The Young Teacher for the Younger Students"; Transliteration: "Nenshō-gumi no chīsana Sensei" (Japanese: 年少組の小さな先生)	30 June 1985
Sara begins tutoring Becky, and Sensei Dufarge encourages her to do the same for Lottie, Susan, Penelope, Jane and Ermengarde between shopping trip. Although the Headmistress uncharacteristically approves after input from Sensei Dufarge, it is uncertain if being a part-time teacher is a step up for Sara or another form of subjugation.
27	"The Departure of Sensei Dufarge"; Transliteration: "Dyufaruju Sensei no kikoku" (Japanese: デュファルジュ先生の帰国)	7 July 1985
Although Sara and Becky are usually alone at the end of the workday, Lavinia (with Jessie and Gertrude in tow) needs a French translation of her letters home. Even with Becky's help, doing Lavinia's homework makes it difficult for Sara to get to her own class on time. Although Sensei Dufarge sees through Lavinia's deception because of her clumsiness in reading French, he is intimidated by the girl because the Headmistress wants him to retire. Sara is distraught when Becky tells her the news, because Sensei Dufarge was a dear friend to her.
28	"The Hubbub of Summer Vacation"; Transliteration: "Natsuyasumi no Ōsōdō" (Japanese: 夏休みの大騒動)	14 July 1985
The students are excited about the upcoming summer holidays. James complains about having to prepare their meals, and Molly is after Sara and Becky about the students' shoes. Lavinia announces her summer plans and leads Jessie and Gertrude in taunting Sara, who is carrying a heavy pair of suitcases. Becky and Ermengarde sense Sara's sadness at seeing the reunited families, but Molly and James send Sara and Becky to buy soap. Becky is dismissed for the summer.
29	"Becky's Return Home"; Transliteration: "Bekkī no satogaeri" (Japanese: ベッキーの里帰り)	21 July 1985
Cesar walks around the empty Seminary dormitories, and James and Molly are reluctant to bother preparing Becky a meal for her trip. The Headmistress gives Becky her salary with instructions to return in time to prepare for the next semester. With Amelia's letter, Sara sees Becky off at the railway station with a brief stop to buy a homecoming gift. Peter and Sara talk about being stuck in London before going their separate ways. Becky lives in Ashfield, a small town, and is greeted by her mother. At the Seminary, Sara cleans up and prepares for bed.
30	"The Indian Gentleman"; Transliteration: "Indo kara kita shinshi" (Japanese: インドからきた紳士)	4 August 1985
Reconciling herself to being alone in the attic while Becky is in Ashfield, Sara wakes up and throws breadcrumbs to the sparrows. She notices that the house next door seems to have many children, and hopes to play with them. Molly orders her to bring breakfast in bed to the Headmistress, who tells her to clean the classroom windows and send a message to Amelia. Sara receives a letter from Becky, and Cesar discovers that the house next door is being renovated. On her way back from Covent Garden Sara sees the Indian lascar Ram Dass unload his master, Thomas Carrisford, from a carriage.
31	"The Monster in the Attic"; Transliteration: "Yaneura ni kita kaibutsu" (Japanese: 屋根裏にきた怪物)	11 August 1985
Sara gazes at the attic of the house next door, hoping to see one of the children, before feeding the sparrows and beginning her workday. On her Covent Garden shopping trip she realizes that Thomas's health is starting to deteriorate and even if there are playmates next door, the Headmistress probably would not allow her to play outside. Becky returns early to the Seminary, and the Headmistress says that she will deduct the cost of Becky's food from her salary. When she begins to unpack, she hears a sound in her room that sends her racing downstairs; Ram Dass's pet monkey, Surya, decided to visit the Seminary and also frightens Cesar.
32	"The Secret on the Other Side of the Wall"; Transliteration: "Kabe no mukō gawa no himitsu" (Japanese: 壁の向う側の秘密)	18 August 1985
Becky sees a doctor go into the next door. Amelia mentions that Thomas Carrisford is a bachelor diamond prospector, and James and Molly ridicule Sara because of her father's involvement in the business. James sends Sara to Covent Garden, where she again sees Donald Carmichael (the boy who gave her a coin). Thomas talks to Solicitor Carmichael; he is in England to oversee Ralph's "little missus" as his ward and tell her that her father's diamond-prospecting venture is successful.
33	"The New Semester"; Transliteration: "Shin Gakki no Ijiwaru" (Japanese: 新学期のいじわる)	25 August 1985
James, Molly, Sara and Becky must, among other things, prepare a community meal to ready the Seminary for the returning students; the Headmistress checks Becky and Sara's work. Governess Herbert and Lavinia arrive with a large carriage, and Lavinia's attitude towards Sara remains unchanged. Sara's sixpence can get a window repaired, leaving Becky's salary intact.
34	"Redemption in the Storm"; Transliteration: "Arashi no Naka no Tsugunai" (Japanese: 嵐の中のつぐない)	8 September 1985
James orders the wet and cold Sara to replenish the coal and fuel the furnaces. Although Cesar keeps her company, he forces her to do a rainy-day laundry run in addition to the usual grocery shopping. Sara visits the dress shop where she found her doll, whose proprietor remembers her and agrees to help; while she cleans Lavinia's dress, Sara is horrified to discover that the only thing to be had in Covent Garden is pneumonia.
35	"An Intense Fever"; Transliteration: "Kiesōna Inochi" (Japanese: 消えそうな命)	22 September 1985
Sara is bedridden with a high fever which Becky tries to treat on her own, since she, James and Molly must do all the work. She is then treated by the chronically-inebriated Dr. Wild. Concerned that the Seminary will be quarantined, the Headmistress tells the students to avoid Sara. Ermengarde visits her anyway, suggesting that her Aunt Eliza compound a medicine which reduces her fever.
36	"Beginning of the Magic"; Transliteration: "Mahō no Hajimari" (Japanese: 魔法のはじまり)	29 September 1985
Ram Dass analyzes Sara's living situation for Thomas. Becky cares for her and reports to the Headmistress, who orders the other girls back to class. Ram Dass gives Sara and Becky a proper dinner and a good night's rest in warm blankets with a nice fire warming the room.
37	"Pandemonium in the Attic"; Transliteration: "Yaneura Wa Dai-konran" (Japanese: 屋根裏は大混乱)	6 October 1985
Relieved that their magical paradise was not a dream, Sara and Becky go down to the kitchen to start the fire and prepare breakfast to the delight of James and Molly. Molly brings Sara to the Headmistress, whose displeasure at paying Dr. Wild's fee costs Sara her instruction stipend for Ermengarde, Lottie, Susan, Penelope and Jane. Peter enlists his chimney-sweep friend, Jim, to sneak into the Seminary and appraise Sara's status. Once inside, he and Jim do not find Sara asleep in her attic bedroom. After being discovered by the Headmistress, Molly, James, Lavinia, Jessie and Gertrude, Peter is relieved to find Sara in good health (despite her and Becky having to clean up the ashes).
38	"The Magic Dispelled"; Transliteration: "Kowasareta mahō" (Japanese: こわされた魔法)	13 October 1985
Sara awakens to find that the magical warmth and comfort has not disappeared, and invites Becky to her room for breakfast. Although Becky is grateful for nutritious food and warm bedding, she suspects that it may have a price. Ram Dass enjoys watching Sara and Becky converse over breakfast before they begin their workday. James and Molly are surprised at the girls' energy; the Headmistress instructs them to watch Sara while she checks her room. Not realizing that Molly is listening, Peter shares an apple with Sara after helping her with grocery shopping and the Headmistress shows up in her room that night.
39	"A Cold Night in the Stable"; Transliteration: "Umagoya no Samui Yoru" (Japanese: 馬小屋の寒い夜)	20 October 1985
Although the Headmistress does not know the identity of Sara's benefactor, she tells Molly to remove her and take her to a stable. Becky and Ermengarde are distressed at the Headmistress's open show of hostility, and Lottie leads the students (except Lavinia, Jessie and Gertrude) in demonstrating silent support of Sara. Sara prepares the classroom fire, Molly charges her for her cups and plates and James sends Becky shopping at Covent Garden. Ram Dass and Thomas plan their next move, and Peter accompanies Becky on another smuggling operation. Ermengarde demands an explanation from Lavinia of her persecution of Sara, and learns about the collusion between the Headmistress and Lavinia.
40	"Miss Amelia's Tears"; Transliteration: "Ameria Sensei no Namida" (Japanese: アメリア先生の涙)	27 October 1985
Sara tries to keep warm in the stable, and the Headmistress goes to see the mayor. Amelia is left in charge, to the girls' delight (especially Sara and Becky). Amelia wants to take the students on a field trip (including a picnic lunch) after church, but her fear of dogs ruins the outing. Peter takes the injured Amelia back to the Seminary, and Sara goes in search of the inebriated Dr. Wild. Amelia describes life with Maria Minchin before she became headmistress of the Seminary, without compassion or gratitude.
41	"Party of the Spirits"; Transliteration: "Yōsei-tachi no Pātī" (Japanese: 妖精たちのパーティー)	3 November 1985
Amelia wants to host a Halloween party to welcome All Saints' Day, and Lavinia wants everyone to have her own pumpkin. Sara and Becky leave for Covent Garden, and Thomas and Ram Dass recruit the dress-shop proprietor to prepare a care package for Sara. Despite Molly's order to avoid Peter, he helps Sara and Becky with the groceries. Amelia knows a number of party games, and is a good hostess when the Headmistress steps aside. While the latter has a quiet midnight snack in her room and James and Molly are out, Lavinia, Jessie and Gertrude play a prank on Lottie which results in a fire at the stable where Sara sleeps in.
42	"Driven Away on a Snowy Day"; Transliteration: "Yuki no hi no Tsuihō" (Japanese: 雪の日の追放)	10 November 1985
Although Sara escapes the fire with Emily and her photograph of her parents, the Headmistress refuses to believe that she was not to blame for the fire and tells her to leave the Seminary. Amelia finds Peter and the disconsolate Sara by a river, and Peter brings Sara home to his family. Sara wants to support herself, and Maggie has Mary show her how to sell matches.
43	"The Wonderful Parcel of Happiness"; Transliteration: "Shiawase no Suteki na Kozutsumi" (Japanese: 幸せの素敵な小包)	8 December 1985
Freed from the Seminary, Sara has adjusted to selling matches despite its cyclical nature. Donald stops the carriage to buy some matches as a gesture of charity. Peter arrives to bring Sara home, where Amelia is waiting to beg her to return to the Seminary despite the Headmistress's wrath. Sara is reunited with Lottie and Ermengarde, and opens a mysterious parcel which arrived in her absence: Thomas's care package. The Headmistress has her try on an outfit, which fits her well, and that night Sara writes a letter of gratitude.
44	"Ah! It Is the Child!"; Transliteration: "Ā! Kono ko da!" (Japanese: ああ！ この子だ！)	15 December 1985
Unaware that Ram Dass paid her a late-night visit, Sara shows Ermengarde the desk where she placed the letter she had written. Although Thomas is happy to receive Sara's letter, he is uncertain of the kind of person the little missus has become since her father's death. Donald describes buying matches from Sara, but cannot identify or help locate her. Surya jumps onto the Seminary's roof, and Sara takes him in to enjoy the warm fire. However, she must then hide the monkey from the Headmistress. Sara smuggles him out with Becky keeping watch, but Lavinia sees her. Sara returns Surya to his home and meets Thomas, who finally recognizes her as Ralph's little missus.
45	"Miss Minchin's Regret"; Transliteration: "Minchin Inchō no Kōkai" (Japanese: ミンチン院長の後悔)	22 December 1985
Sara becomes acquainted with Thomas Carrisford, and Becky suffers the Headmistress's wrath until Lavinia reveals Sara's whereabouts. The Headmistress decides to retrieve Sara, by force if necessary. She is rebuffed as Solicitor Carmichael has prepared the legal paperwork to establish Sara as heiress of the diamond mines. The Headmistress is astonished as Amelia angrily admonishes her, stating that the Headmistress's mistreatment of Sara will surely be exposed, which would lead to the Seminary's closure. Becky learns through Ram Dass that Sara is coming back for her.
46	"Till We Meet Again"; Transliteration: "Mata Au-hi Made" (Japanese: また逢う日まで)	29 December 1985
Sara is a "diamond princess", and Maria Minchin has been foiled by her sister. The girls are preparing for the Christmas party. Maria is in her office, hoping not to be arrested for mistreating Sara, when Amelia exhorts her to cheer up. Molly says that Thomas Carrisford and Solicitor Carmichael are complying with Sara's wishes to make a generous donation to the Seminary and continue her education there, to the delight of Ermengarde, Lottie and the other students (even Jessie and Gertrude). Lavinia finally reconciles with Sara, who must return to India for four months to tie up some legal loose ends. Although Sara will return to England after 4 months, Lavinia plans to return home to the United States. Sara reminisces about the events of the story as the ship departs for India. After that, Sara smiles goodbye to the entire audience.
