= Dream Hunter Rem =

Japanese original video animation (OVA) series

- Dream Hunter Rem Dennō Kūiki no Meiro CD cover

ドリームハンター麗夢 (Dorīmu Hantā Remu)
- Genre: Girls with guns; Supernatural thriller
- Created by: Project Team Eikyū Kikan (Note: A collective of animators, which includes Seiji Okuda, Kazuaki Mori, Yasunori Kamii, Makoto Nagao, Moriyasu Taniguchi, Hiroshi Osaka and others.)
- Original video animation

Pilot episode
- Directed by: Satoru Kumazaki
- Written by: Seiji Okuda
- Music by: Hideo Gotou
- Studio: Aubec
- Released: June 10, 1985
- Runtime: 22 minutes
- Original video animation
- Directed by: Seiji Okuda (chief)
- Produced by: Kiyoshi Tonosaki; Masatsugu Nagai (eps. 1–3); Masayoshi Ozaki (eps. 4–5)
- Written by: Seiji Okuda; Yoh Yuki
- Studio: Anime-R (eps. 1–3); Studio Sign (eps. 4–5); Trans Arts (eps. 4–5); Aubec (ep. 1) (Note: Aubec animated the first half of episode 1 (which is actually the pilot episode without the erotic scenes) while Anime-R animated the second half (which is de facto episode 1).)
- Released: December 5, 1985 – December 16, 1992
- Runtime: 36–58 minutes
- Episodes: 5
- Manga

Dream Hunter Rem XX (Note: ドリームハンター麗夢XX, Dorīmu Hantā Remu Daburu Ekkusu)
- Written by: Satoru Kumazaki
- Illustrated by: R. Hiura
- Published by: Kill Time Communication
- Magazine: Comic Unreal
- Published: 2009
- Volumes: 1
- Manga

Dream Hunter Rem Alternative (Note: ドリームハンター麗夢 オルタナティブ, Dorīmu Hantā Remu Orutanatibu)
- Written by: Seiji Okuda
- Illustrated by: R. Hiura
- Published by: Kill Time Communication
- Magazine: Comic Valkyrie
- Published: 2011
- Volumes: 2

Dream Hunter Rem (ドリームハンター麗夢 (Note: Originally released in Japan under the title ドリームハンターレム, with Rem written in kana (レム) instead of kanji (麗夢).), Dorīmu Hantā Remu) is a Japanese OVA series released from 1985 to 1992. Rem Ayanokōji is a "dream hunter", a person capable of entering the dreams of sleeping people and fighting the demons causing nightmares. The stories have their base in supernatural and standard horror, with action scenes and mystery elements.

== Production ==
Dream Hunter Rem was an anime project created by Project Team Eikyū Kikan. The pilot episode was originally animated by Aubec and released as a side project OVA which contained a short episode. Due to high popularity, the production team decided to release subsequent videos into the anime market. The pilot episode was later re-released as "Special Version", removing all pornographic scenes and adding nearly 30 minutes of new footage made by Anime-R. Two new episodes, also animated by Anime-R with character designs by Kazuaki Mori, were released in the 1980s. In the 1990s, the OVA series was resumed and gained two more episodes with a new title: New Dream Hunter Rem (NEWドリームハンター麗夢, Nyū Dorīmu Hantā Remu); these last two episodes were animated by Studio Sign and Trans Arts.

== Characters ==
Rem Ayanokōji (綾小路 麗夢, Ayanokōji Remu)
Voiced by: Naoko Matsui
While appearing to be a typical junior high school age girl, Rem's age is unclear and her family situation unknown, and she never discusses these matters. Rem has the psychic ability to enter the dreams of other individuals. She is a descendant of a long line of people with the ability to be "Dream Guardians," those who hunt down the demons who try to steal the life force of humans by invading their dreams. She makes her living as a private detective investigating supernatural matters. Her headquarters, the Ayanokōji Detective Agency, is located on a side street off Aoyama in Tokyo. As her investigations are limited to supernatural and bizarre phenomenon, her advertising is limited to word of mouth from grateful clients.
Alpha (アルファ, Arufa)
Voiced by: Masumi Gotō and Sanae Miyuki
Rem's pet kitten, who also acts as support by transforming into a large wild cat during confrontations with Rem's opponents.
Beta (ベータ, Bēta)
Voiced by: Naoki Tatsuta
Rem's pet puppy, who acts as support by transforming into a large wild dog when needed. Beta has the ability to track ghosts and spirits.
Enkō (円光)
Voiced by: Show Hayami
A mysterious ascetic monk who, while unable to enter dreams and confront dream demons there, he is able to offer strong assistance when Rem is fighting outside the dream world. He has very powerful abilities due to his strong faith. In the real world, he is able to use powerful martial arts techniques in order to fight the demons in their true form. He also has strong feelings of love toward Rem.
Detective Junichirō Sakaki (榊 純一郎 警部, Sakaki Jun'ichirō Keibu)
Voiced by: Kenji Utsumi
An inspector from police headquarters. He became acquainted with Rem during a demon nightmare incident involving his daughter Yukari. While he was decorated for meritorious service during the incident, he has come to think of himself as incompetent and been involved in many bizarre occurrences.
Umimaru Kidō (鬼童海丸, Kidō Umimaru)
Voiced by: Shūichi Ikeda
A dedicated student of psychology, and assistant professor at Genjōsai University, Kidō is also a computer expert. He also has strong romantic feelings toward Rem, and frequently battles Enkō for her attention.
Dr. Shinigami (死神博士, Shinigami Hakase) / Mephisto (メフィスト, Mefisuto)
Voiced by: Tamio Ōki
His real name is Shimura (死夢羅), and he has the same Dream Guardian ancestors as Rem. However, he uses his power in order to murder people in their dreams.
Tokiko Ozu
Voiced by: Kazuko Yanaga
Saeko Asuka
Voiced by: Masako Katsuki
Yōko Takamiya
Voiced by: Sumi Shimamoto
Kyōko Takamiya
Voiced by: Sumi Shimamoto and Kei Tomiyama

Kyoko is Yoko's twin sister, Yoko states Kyoko was mature and outgoing, unlike her. Kyoko fought back against Saeko, Yoko told her that they couldn't compete with Saeko's beauty. Everyone began to hate Kyoko, Yumi, Hiroko and Akane bullied Kyoko. Saeko punished Kyoko with a rose whip and locked her in a room in the Clock Tower.

Akemi Katsuragi
Voiced by: Miki Takahashi
Elizabeth
Voiced by: Emi Shinohara

== Releases ==
=== OVAs ===
No.	Title	Episode director	Writer	Music composer	Runtime	Release date	Distributed by	Ref.
00	Dream Hunter Rem (Note: ドリームハンターレム, Dorīmu Hantā Remu)	Satoru Kumazaki	Seiji Okuda	Hideo Gotou	22 minutes	June 10, 1985	Orange Video House	
01	Dream Hunter Rem — Special Version: Nightmare! The Resurrection of Dr. Shinigami (Note: ドリームハンター麗夢 スペシャルバージョン／惨夢! 甦る死神博士, Dorīmu Hantā Remu Supesharu Bājon: Akumu! Yomigaeru Shinigami Hakase) (Note: The first half of episode 1 is a remake of the pilot episode without the erotic scenes.)	Satoru Kumazaki & Seiji Okuda	Seiji Okuda	Heitaro Manabe & Hideo Gotou	46 minutes	December 5, 1985	Sai Enterprise	
02	Dream Hunter Rem 2: A Spectre at Seibishinjo High School (Note: ドリームハンター麗夢2／聖美神女学園の妖夢, Dorīmu Hantā Remu Tsū: Seibishinjo Gakuen no Yōmu)	Makoto Nagao	Yoh Yuki	Hiroshi Sugiyama	58 minutes	September 5, 1986	Sai Enterprise	
03	Dream Hunter Rem 3: Hidden Dream! The Legend of the Headless Knight (Note: ドリームハンター麗夢3／夢隠! 首なし武者伝説, Dorīmu Hantā Remu Surī: Yumegakushi! Kubinashimusha Densetsu)	Yasunori Kamii	Yoh Yuki	Kenji Kawai	55 minutes	February 5, 1987	Sai Enterprise	
04	New Dream Hunter Rem: The Dream Knights (Note: NEW(ニュー)ドリームハンター麗夢／夢の騎士達, Nyū Dorīmu Hantā Remu: Yume no Kishi-tachi)	Seiji Okuda		Tsuyoshi Ishibashi	36 minutes	December 16, 1990	Meldac	
05	New Dream Hunter Rem 2: Massacre in the Labyrinth (Note: NEW(ニュー)ドリームハンター麗夢2／殺戮の夢幻迷宮(ラビリンス), Nyū Dorīmu Hantā Remu Tsū: Satsuriku no Rabirinsu)	Seiji Okuda		Seikou Nagaoka	50 minutes	August 21, 1992	Cyclone	

=== CDs ===
- Dream Hunter Rem Original Soundtrack: Special (King Records, K30X-7102, December 21, 1987)
- Dream Hunter Rem: Dennō Kūiki no Meiro (King Records, K30X-7140, October 21, 1988)
- Dream Hunter Rem: Minami Azabu Mahō Club (King Records, 276A-7003, April 21, 1989)
- New Dream Hunter Rem Image Album: Yume no Kishi-tachi (Meldac, MECH-30001, November 21, 1990)
- New Dream Hunter Rem Voice Movie: Yume no Kishi-tachi (Meldac, MECH-30004, January 21, 1991)
- New Dream Hunter Rem: Sōtō no Mercedes (Cyclone, CYCC-10002, April 25, 1992)
- New Dream Hunter Rem Voice Movie: Satsuriku no Labyrinth (Cyclone, CYCC-10005, September 25, 1992)

=== DVDs ===
- Dream Hunter Rem DVD-BOX 1 (Only Hearts, OHK-0028, November 22, 2006)
- Dream Hunter Rem DVD-BOX 2 (Only Hearts, OHK-0035, May 23, 2007)

=== Novels ===
- Dream Hunter Rem V: Yume Circus Bishōjo Jigokuhen (written by Seiji Okuda, art by Kazuaki Mōri, Tokuma Communications, October 1989)
- Dream Hunter Rem: Floyd-jō Genmutan (written by Yoh Yuki, art by Kazuaki Mōri, Keibunsha, January 30, 1992)

=== Manga series ===
- Dream Hunter Rem XX (Kill Time Communication, 2009)
- Dream Hunter Rem Alternative (Kill Time Communication, 2011)

=== Anthology comics ===
- Party of Rem (Rapport, January 20, 1991)
- Fiesta of Rem (Rapport, August 20, 1992)

=== Books ===
- Dream Hunter Rem I (Tokuma Communications, December 10, 1987)
- Dream Hunter Rem II (Tokuma Communications, April 10, 1988)
- Dream Hunter Rem III (Tokuma Communications, July 20, 1988)
- Dream Hunter Rem SP (Tokuma Communications, March 31, 1990)

Additional release sources:

=== In other media ===
Rem appears as a playable character in the PlayStation 3 and PlayStation Vita simulation RPG, Super Heroine Chronicle.

== Reception ==
The Encyclopedia of Science Fiction described Dream Hunter REM as an entertaining anime combining fantasy, horror and magical girl conventions, but criticized its failure to explore the psychological possibilities of dreams becoming real and subject to manipulation. It noted the series' recurring preoccupation with beauty and its extensive use of violent and disturbing imagery, including references to classic fairy tales and Edgar Allan Poe's "The Pit and the Pendulum". Although the encyclopedia considered the series enjoyable, it found that its longer episodes sometimes overstayed their welcome. It also highlighted the work's origins as a pornographic OVA, observing that subsequent installments considerably reduced the sexual content while retaining frequent fan service.

== See also ==
- Dimension Hunter Fandora, a similar anime OVA trilogy released in the same year
