= Super Sunday (TV series) =

1980s American television series

The Super Sunday logo

Super Sunday (also called Super Saturday) was a 1980s American animated television series produced by Sunbow Productions and Marvel Productions. It was distributed by Claster Television. Super Sunday was a half-hour block with four six-minute matinée segments of Jem, Bigfoot and the Muscle Machines, Robotix, and Inhumanoids. It aired on various television stations in syndication on Sunday mornings from October 6, 1985 to October 1986. In markets that the series aired on Saturday, the series was retitled Super Saturday. All four segments were based on Hasbro toy lines.

== List ==
For the first four weeks of Robotix, two consecutive episodes were broadcast as a bridge until Jem began airing. It is believed that the later Inhumanoids also ran two consecutive episodes in some weeks before the stand-alone show began.

Title	Original release	Episodes
Robotix	October 6 – December 15, 1985	15; 5 (half-hour version)
Bigfoot and the Muscle Machines	October 6 – December 1, 1985	9
Jem	November 3, 1985 – February 9, 1986; April 21–25, 1986 (half-hour version)	15; 5 (half-hour version)
Inhumanoids	June 29 – September 14, 1986; September 15 – 19, 1986 (half-hour version)	15; 5 (half-hour version)

== History ==
The block began as Super Week, a five-day tryout that featured the first five chapters of Robotix while beginning Bigfoot and the Muscle Machines. The series were cycled through, and only two or three of the four different segments appeared in a given episode. Despite all four shorts being collected into stand-alone made-for-TV films (as was done with previous Sunbow/Marvel collaborations G.I. Joe and The Transformers), only Inhumanoids and Jem went on to be expanded into independent full-length shows.

=== Stations ===
City	Station
Atlanta	WATL 36
Baltimore	WMAR 2
Boston	WLVI 56
Buffalo	WUTV 29
Cape Girardeau	KBSI 23
Davenport	KLJB 18
Dayton	WRGT 45
Denver	KWGN 2
Detroit	WXON 20
Houston	KTXH 20
Fort Wayne	WFFT 55
Green Bay	WXGZ 32
Greenville	WHNS 21
Hartford	WTIC 34
Indianapolis	WTTV 4
Kansas City	KSMO 62
Lincoln	KBGT 8
Los Angeles	KCOP 13
Louisville	WDRB 41
Memphis	WMKW 30
Minneapolis	KMSP 9
Nashville	WCAY 30
New York City	WPIX 11
Oklahoma City	KGMC 34
Orlando	WOFL 33
Pittsburgh	WPGH 53
Poland Spring	WMTW 8
Portland	KPTV 12
Rochester	WHEC 10
Sacramento	KRBK 31
San Francisco	KBHK 44
Shreveport	KMSS 33
Spokane	KAYU 28
Springfield	KDEB 27
St. Louis	KPLR 11
Tacoma	KSTW 11
Tampa	WFTS 28
Washington, D.C.	WTTG 5
