= Bigfoot and the Muscle Machines =

- Genre: Action; Adventure
- Written by: Flint Dille
- Starring: Susan Blu; Wally Burr; Peter Cullen; Pat Fraley; Jerry Houser; Vince Howard; Chris Latta; Lance LeGault; Neil Ross; Arthur Burghardt
- Theme music composer: Robert J. Walsh
- Country of origin: United States
- Original language: English

Production
- Running time: 53 minutes
- Production companies: Hasbro; Sunbow Productions; Marvel Productions; Toei Animation

Bigfoot and the Muscle Machines is a 1985 American animated TV miniseries that aired on the animated half-hour TV series Super Sunday and Super Saturday containing nine segments that ran for 6 minutes each weekend, along with Jem, Robotix, and Inhumanoids. The segments were combined and turned into a 53-minute feature-length film. The series was based on SST (Super-Sized Trucks) Muscle Machines toy line by Playskool who in turn was owned by Hasbro.

This cartoon and the other Super Sunday cartoons were animated by Toei Animation in Japan. The show featured animated versions of vehicles popular in real life competing under the United States Hot Rod Association banner, including Bob Chandler's Bigfoot monster truck, Allen Gaines' Orange Blossom Special two-wheel-drive pulling truck, Kenneth and Paula Geuin's Black Gold four-wheel-drive pulling truck, and Dan Patrick's War Lord pulling funny car.

== Plot ==
The story is about five people who run a public monster truck show led by Yank Justice, driver of Bigfoot. The other members of the show include Red & Redder (twin sisters who drive Black Gold), Professor D (driver of the Orange Blossom Special), and Close McCall (driver of War Lord). A young woman named Jennifer McGraw steals an ancient map that leads to the Fountain of Youth in Florida from an elderly corrupt billionaire named Adrian Ravenscroft, known as "Mr. Big". He hires a gang of henchmen who helped him try to get the map back; they include a man named Ernie Slye, as well as Ravenscroft's limousine chauffeur. This band of criminals chases Yank Justice and his friends across the United States and try to kill them.

In the end, Ravenscroft finds the Fountain and, after drinking its water, is turned into a young man, becoming a far more formidable opponent for Yank. Yank and the others destroy the Fountain with their trucks, and Ravenscroft makes one final attempt to defeat Yank by trying to ram his limousine into Yank's truck, but Yank is able to move out of the way, and Ravenscroft's car is destroyed when it careens out of control. Ravenscroft tries to flee, swearing revenge, but the effects of the Fountain wear off and he is quickly turned back into his elderly self and is unable to see that he is walking into an alligator-infested swamp, presumably meeting his fate.

The scene then cuts to the rubble that once was Fountain of Youth and Jennifer bemoaning its destruction. Just as a disgusted McCall walks away, an earthquake forms a large crevice, containing a huge fortune in gold, jewels and other rare artifacts. While he and several members of the Bigfoot team celebrate their discovery, Yank walks away, and Jennifer joins him as they drive into the sunset.

== See also ==
- Lists of animated films
