= List of High School! Kimengumi characters =

High School! Kimengumi has a large cast of characters. Because there are so many puns in Kimengumi, including the names of all of the characters, all of the character names appear in Japanese order (family name, given name) so that the jokes found in the names make sense. The voice actors names appear in the more common "given name, family name" order.

== Kimengumi and friends ==
L→R, Back: Dai, Kiyoshi, Rei, Jin, and Gō. L→R, Front: Chie and Yui.

Ichidō Rei (一堂 零, "All together, bow!") Voiced by: Shigeru Chiba (1985 series)(Parallel World Ray,2026 Series Episode 11), Tomokazu Seki (2026 series) (Japanese); keith Silverstein (English)
Kimengumi leader and protagonist of the series. Nickname: Mayunashi no Rei (まゆなしの零, No-Eyebrows Rei). His family runs a toy store, he lives with his father and younger sister (his mother has already died). Considered a "High Class Buffoon", he retains the same simple-mindedness he had as a child and is quite the hentai (as in "weirdo" rather than "pervert"). He is known for being able to do many odd things with his body. It took him three tries to pass the high school entry exam, but he finally manages to graduate to Ichiō High with his current class.
Reietsu Gō (冷越 豪,, sounds like "Let's Go") Voiced by: Tesshō Genda (1985 series), Shunsuke Takeuchi (2026 series)
Kimengumi member #2. Nickname: Manako no Gō (まなこの豪, Eyeballs Gō). His family runs a sake store. He lives with his uncle's family. Despite being underage, he is occasionally drunk. He is a huge pro wrestling fan and can walk on water. He is a very hearty and violent fellow and does not always give Rei proper Leader treatment, but he is also kind hearted and does not allow others to make fun of his friends. It took him three tries to pass the high school entry exam.
Shusse Kiyoshi (出瀬 潔,, "Roll call...", "Here!") Voiced by: Issei Futamata (1985 series), Yoshitsugu Matsuoka (2026 series) (Japanese); Jonah Scott (English)
Kimengumi member. Nickname: Mukiba no Kiyoshi (むき歯の潔, Exposed Teeth Kiyoshi). His family runs a bathhouse. He is known around the school as a lecher, often peeking on the women's side of his parents' bathhouse. However, he is the brains of Kimengumi. His best friend is Jin. It took him three tries to pass the high school entry exam.
Daima Jin (大間 仁,, Great Majin) Voiced by: Naoki Tatsuta (1985 series), Chiaki Kobayashi (2026 series) (Japanese); Zeno Robinson (English)
Kimengumi member. Nickname: Ebisu no Jin (えびすの仁, (Japanese God) Jin similar to Ebisu). His family runs a cake shop (bakery and cake shop in anime). He loves to just eat and sleep and will often doze off during class. Although usually a very nice guy, his personality changes greatly when you mess with his food. He is very lucky and has excellent mimicry skills; particularly he is skilled at mimicking singer Yoshinori Monta. It took him two tries to pass the high school entry exam.
Monohoshi Dai (物星 大,, Drying rack) Voiced by: Kaneto Shiozawa (1985 series), Kikunosuke Toya (2026 series) (Japanese); Johnny Yong Bosch (English) (Kousuke Okano in 2000 PlayStation game)
Kimengumi member. Nickname: Ochobokō no Dai (おちょぼ口の大, Small Mouth Dai). His family runs a bookstore. He is an okama and is very feminine and will sometimes use this as a weapon. He is the weakest of the gang but is brave when he needs to be. He frequently cries and frequently undresses. It took him two tries to pass the high school entry exam.
Kawa Yui (河川 唯,, Cutie) Voiced by: Miki Takahashi (1985 series), Haruka Shiraishi (2026 series) (Japanese); Iris Menas (English)
The pink-haired classmate of the Kimengumi. She is very pretty and is popular with the male students. However, she isn't always aware of this. She is an oddball herself and has no interest in normal guys. She instead hangs out with Kimengumi and gradually falls in love with Rei. She often likes to become involved with games, but is not always aware when she loses. She graduates from Ōsei Junior High and goes on to Ichiō High. At the beginning of the series she is a more comical character, but by halfway through 3rd Year Kimengumi she has become the straight man of the group.
Uru Chie (宇留 千絵,, colloquial Japanese for "Urusai", meaning "loud" or "obnoxious") Voiced by: Naoko Matsui (1985 series), Ikumi Hasegawa (2026 series) (Japanese); Mela Lee (English)
The green-haired classmate of Kimengumi and best friend of Yui. Her family runs a flower shop. Very strong-willed, she initially acts as the straight man to Yui and Kimengumi, but later becomes more comical. She hates it when people say that she has droopy eyes. In Junior High she had semi-long hair, but in High School she wears her hair in a ponytail. She and Yui hardly ever quarrel, and when they do it is usually a misunderstanding or accident. It is often hinted that she is very close to Gō, and at the end of the series they are depicted as living together in the Reietsu house (but whether or not her name is in the family registry is unknown).
Lassie (ラッシー, Rasshī) Voiced by: Naoki Tatsuta
Rei's dog, named after the dog in the television series Lassie. Unlike other dogs, Lassie can walk on two legs like a human. He sometimes gets punished by Rei or his father and sister. Lassie has four dog friends, who try to help and support Lassie in various things or situations. He even has a crush on Yui's dog Beauty, whom he had won over after a battle with a dog who had previously been her lover.

== Kimengumi families ==
=== Ichidō family ===
- Ichidō Takuseki (一堂 琢石) Voiced by: Yusaku Yara

Rei's father and proprietor of Omocha no Ichidō (おもちゃの一堂,, Ichidō's Toys). He and his late wife Naori were childhood friends. He was originally an honest and upright person, but was corrupted by Naori's father Seiretsu. He tends to favor Kiri over Rei, particularly in High School! Kimegumi. He was modeled after Cha Katō.

- Ichidō Kiri (一堂 霧) Voiced by: Mayumi Shō

Rei's little sister (8 years younger). Unlike Rei and Takuseki, she is rather normal and even strives to be an honor student. She is ashamed of her father and brother's behavior, and tries to hide her connection to them from her classmates. After Naori's death she takes care of all the housework. She first appears as an elementary school student, but halfway through the series she is suddenly depicted as a Junior High student. She is in love with Yui's little brother Ippei, and the two of them usually hang out together with Kiyoshi's little sister Kiyoi.

- Ichidō Naori - No voice actor
- Zenin Seiretsu - Takeshi Aono

=== Kawa family ===
- Kawa Itazō - Kōji Totani
- Kawa Riya - does not appear in anime
- Kawa Ippei - Yūko Mita
- Kawa Iko - Run Sasaki

=== Reietsu family ===
- Reietsu Pūtarō - ???
- Reietsu Gōgo - ???
- Reietsu Torae - ???

=== Shusse family ===
- Shusse Sendarō - Sanji Hase
- Shusse Shichiyo - ???
- Shusse Kiyoi - Tomiko Suzuki

=== Daima family ===
- Daima Kyū - Rokuro Naya
- Daima's Mother - Seiko Nakano
- Daima Ō - does not appear in anime

=== Monohoshi family ===
- Monohoshi Hiyori - Yuri Nashiwa
- Monohoshi Zao - Only appears in "Flash"

=== Uru family ===
- Uru Saizō - Kazuyuki Sogabe
- Uru Sae - Asami Mukaidono→Rihoko Yoshida
- Beauty - Yuriko Yamamoto

== Middle school gangs ==
=== Iro'otokogumi (class 3) ===
Iro'otokogumi (色男組,, Ladykiller Gang)

Leader

- Kireide Shō (切出 翔,, Aren't I handsome) Voiced by: Keiichi Nanba (1985 series), Daisuke Sakuma (2026 series)

Considered the most attractive man in the school. He specifically sets his eyes on Yui but because she dislikes pushy, overconfident guys he is rejected for the first time. As vain and as popular as he is though, he isn't all that smart and even failed his first attempt at the college entrance exam. He is also very bad at sports with the sole exception of skating, and it has been hinted that he has been practising at that his entire life.

Members

- Setto Kimeru (節戸 決,, do my hair) Voiced by: Takurō Kitagawa (1985 series), Hayato Yamamoto (2026 series)

Has a regent hairstyle and is in love with both Yui and Chie. He is very superficial and has a manly face.

- Sugata Kazaru (姿 飾,, Decorated form) Voiced by: Ayato Morinaga (2026 series)

Has an afro hairstyle. Like Shō, he is in love with Yui. Even though they share a lot in common, he tends to play straight man to Shō.

- Hokori Takashi (矛利 高志,, Very prideful) Voiced by: Shigeru Nakahara (1985 series), Hiroki Nishimiya (2026 series)

The only member of Iro'otokogumi with short hair. His nickname is Tatchi (タッチ,, Touch). He also likes both Yui and Chie. Like Udegumi member Yutaka, he will occasionally talk to the readers.

- Tanokin Torio (頼金 鳥雄,, Tanokin Trio) Voiced by: Jun'ichi Kanemaru (1985 series), Yohei Sasamori (2026 series)

He has the same hairstyle as Rei but his facial features resemble Yui's (the author himself points this out at times). His nickname is Toribou (トリ坊) and he is the least superficial of the group.

=== Udegumi (class 9) ===
Udegumi (腕組,, Strongarm Gang)

Leader

- Undō Kai (雲童 塊,, Sports Meet) Voiced by: Kenyu Horiuchi (1985 series), Yūsuke Kobayashi (2026 series)

A young man with good reflexes who holds numerous positions on more than one athletic club. The popularity of himself and Udegumi is second only to Iro'otokogumi. However, he is completely useless at anything non-athletic, and will often go in a corner and begin training during class. He is in fit shape from training all day, be it in class, at home, or anywhere else he goes. He has a father named Joe (丈) and an older twin sister named Mei (see Girls' Volleyball Club).

Members

- Akiresu Ken - Hiroshi Izawa (1985 series), Takuto Yokoyama (2026 series)
- Intahai Susumu - Hōchū Ōtsuka (1985 series), Masayuki Satō (2026 series)
- Konjō Yutaka - Kōzō Shioya (1985 series), Shuya Watanabe (2026 series)
- Suji Chikara - Ryō Horikawa (1985 series), Ayumu Asakura (2026 series)

=== Bangumi (class 4) ===
Bangumi (番組,, Delinquent Gang)

Leader

- Nihiruda Yō (似蛭田 妖,, I am a Nihilist) Voiced by: Hōchū Ōtsuka (1985 series), Nobuhiko Okamoto (2026 series)

A cool customer who is largely considered to be the boss of Ichiō High, although he denies this. He does not wear his uniform, arrives late, leaves early, and smokes regularly. Despite what his many school violations may imply, he actually dislikes causing trouble. His eyes are usually hidden behind his forelock and he has twice failed the college entrance exams.

Members

- Tabuchi Koeru - Kōzō Shioya (1985 series), Kazuki Ogawa (2026 series)
- Nakasudō Omiya - Kōji Totani (1985 series), Toshiki Horikita (2026 series)
- Meri Kensaku - Ryō Horikawa (1985 series), Yūhi Asagiri (2026 series)
- Jōgai Ranto - Masaharu Satō (1985 series), Masafumi Kobatake (2026 series)

=== Honegumi (class 1) ===
Honegumi (骨組,, Buckle Down Gang)

Leader

- Honekishi Muzō (骨岸無造,, Bones creak) Voiced by: Sukekiyo Kameyama

He has a long face and a noticeable upper lip. He and his study group care about nothing other than studying. He is instantly smitten by Yui, but is nonetheless antagonistic towards her. He later graduates and goes onto Ori High (尾利高,, Ori-kō), but because Shinzawa loved drawing his face so much, his little brother Mudarō (無駄郎) (Voiced by: Sukekiyo Kameyama) enrolls in Ichiō High with the Kimengumi.

Members

- Arakata Ukaru - ???
- Munaita Dan - Tomohiro Nishimura
- Waseda Keio - Jun'ichi Kanemaru
- Kurutsu Teru - Tomohiro Nishimura

=== Omegumi (class 7) ===
Omegumi (御女組,, Queen Gang)

Leader

- Amano Jako (天野邪子,, Amanojaku) Voiced by: Yō Inoue (1985 series), M.A.O (2026 series)

A very popular character, she lives up to her name and has the tough personality of a gang member. She loves disco music, and she has always smoked, even before she started elementary school. She and her members frequently leave class early, and she often hands in blank test papers, but after meeting Ikari-sensei she becomes more of a model student (in fact, after graduating high school, she studies abroad in the United States). She has a very sweet face and is often seen with Nihiruda Yō, but whether or not they are involved is unknown. She later harbours feelings for Jidai-sensei. She fails her first entrance exam.

Members

- Hidari Maki: Hiroko Emori (1985 series), Kaoru Sakura (2026 series)
- Sandanbara Ikue: Noriko Uemura (1985 series), Sachiko Okada (2026 series)
- Honba Desuko: Mami Matsui (1985 series), Marie Ōi (2026 series)
- Ohba Kayo: Mari Yokō (1985 series), Minami Shindō (2026 series)

=== Rukkumi (class 6) ===
- Sawaki Makurō: Issei Futamata

=== Fukumi (class 2) ===
- Koyakushimaru Hiro: Arisa Andō
- Matsumo Toiyo: Chie Satō

=== Other middle school characters ===
- Shinjitsu Ichirō: Bin Shimada

== High school classmates ==
- Nikaidō Men'ichi: Hiroshi Takemura
- Monozuki Shumi: Matsumi Ōshiro
- Oda Mari: Kazumi Amemiya

== High school gangs ==
=== Koekumi ===
- Zenini Jūgo: Masashi Hironaka

=== Nikumi ===
- Jaki'ichi En: Toshio Furukawa
- Shō Rinji: Hideyuki Hori
- Ryūno Ninjiya: Show Hayami

=== Shikumi ===
- Kanmu Ryō: Hiroshi Ōtake
- Otokowa Dokyō: Kazuo Oka
- Kai Danji: Yukitoshi Hori

== Club members ==
=== Baseball club ===
- Kanzenji Ai: Hōchū Ōtsuka

=== Drama club ===
- Taiga Dorama: Hideyuki Tanaka
- Kusaishi Nario: Kazuhiko Inoue

=== Girls' volleyball club ===
- Undō Mei: Eiko Hisamura

=== Boxing club ===
- Ichimōda Jin: Kazuhiko Inoue
- Ashita Nojio: Ryūsei Nakao

=== Soccer club ===
- Nanakorobi Yaoki: Kōichi Hashimoto

=== Table tennis club ===
- Taku Kyūma: Shin'ya Ōtaki

== Rival school club members ==
=== Oronainnan High girls' volleyball club ===
- Satsujin Supaiko: Tomie Kataoka

=== Irebun High soccer club ===
- Tamasabaki Takumi: Toshio Furukawa
- Soreike Minna: Masato Hirano

=== Otokono High judo club ===
- Rokujō Hitoma: Banjō Ginga
- Tenka Taihei: Jun Hazumi

== Other high school characters ==
- Nancy Toruneaata: Saeko Shimazu
- Watashidake Katsutoshi: Katsuji Mori
- Harumage Don: Tōru Furuya
- Otonari Hisako: Chika Sakamoto
- Andō Roido: Yūji Mitsuya
- Oyashiki Machi: Masako Miura
- Yaseino Elza: Keiko Toda

== Teachers ==
Ikari Masuyo (伊狩増代,, I'm very mad)
Homeroom teacher of Kimengumi during their Middle School days (Homeroom teacher for Kojougumi during High School). She is a beautiful speech teacher with a hysterical personality. The Kimengumi refer to her as Ikari Kong (イカリコング). She actually used to go to school with Kimengumi as their senpai. She later marries Sessa-sensei and has a son named Tenma (天馬). In the anime she will often say Ikari masu yo! (怒りますよ！, I'm very mad!) when angered. Voiced by Masako Katsuki.
Sessa Takuma (石砂拓真,, Study diligently)
Homeroom teacher for Udegumi. A manly gym teacher with a simple personality. He does not get along well with Iro'oto-sensei, who is his love rival for Ikari-sensei. After marrying Ikari he is transferred to another school. Voiced by Yoshito Yasuhara.

- Irooto Kō: Hiroshi Izawa
- Sainan Auzō: Takurō Kitagawa
- Kaibu Tsuya: Kazuyo Aoki
- Kochō Sakio: Kenichi Ogata
- Toyotoshi Mansaku: Naoki Tatsuta
- Kataiwa Tetsuko: Rihoko Yoshida
- Ran Wakato (若人蘭, Wakato Ran): Yumiko Shibata
- Aozora Haruo: Kōji Totani
- Jidai Sakugo: Hideyuki Tanaka
- Mutsu Gorō: Ikuya Sawaki, Kōichi Kitamura

== Other characters ==
- Himawari: Masaharu Satō
- Tulip: Kōji Totani
- Kashikiri Yasuka: Rika Fukami
- Hirayama Yukio: Kenji Utsumi
- Hitohi Kazuyoshi: Yūji Mitsuya

== See also ==
- High School! Kimengumi
- List of High School! Kimengumi episodes
