= Justy (disambiguation) =

The Justy is a series of subcompact hatchback cars manufactured by Subaru. It can also be a nickname for the given name Justin.

Justy may also refer to:

- Cosmo Police Justy, a 1985 anime OVA based on a manga series by Tsuguo Okazaki
- Justy Ueki Tylor, the main character in the anime series The Irresponsible Captain Tylor
