= Chikkun Takkun =

Television anime

チックンタックン
- Manga
- Written by: Shotaro Ishinomori
- Published by: Gakken
- Magazine: Kagaku to Gakushū
- Original run: 1982 – 1984
- Anime television series
- Directed by: Keiji Hayakawa (1-14); Masami Annō (15-23)
- Produced by: Kazuya Maeda (Fuji TV, 15-23); Jinbo Matsue (Gakken); Yoshirō Kataoka (NAS)
- Written by: Yū Yamamoto, et al
- Music by: Fumitaka Anzai
- Studio: Studio Pierrot
- Original network: FNS (Fuji TV)
- Original run: April 9, 1984 – September 28, 1984
- Episodes: 23

Chikkun Takkun (チックンタックン) is a Japanese manga series written and illustrated by Shotaro Ishinomori. It was adapted into a 23-episode anime television series which was produced by Gakken and Fuji Television, co-produced by Nihon Ad Systems, and animated by Studio Pierrot, broadcasting on Fuji TV from April 9 to September 28, 1984. The series revolves around an alien duck named Chikkun and his advisor Takkun, trying to stop an alien mad scientist from invading Earth.

== Characters ==
Chikkun Duck (チックン・ダック, Chikkun Dakku)
The young prince of Star R, who has gone to Earth in an attempt to recover the Waruchin. In the manga, he goes to Earth just to explore the planet. He is in the Star R equivalent of elementary school, and is very curious and childish sometimes. While he is set to marry Princess Leah when he grows up, he has a crush on Miko. Voice: Masako Sugaya
Takkun Hat (タックン・ハット, Takkun Hatto)
Chikkun's royal advisor, a robotic hat that can pull any item out of himself, like Doraemon. He is very sharp-eyed and a wise scientist, trying to tutor Chikkun, and Chikkun holds high regards for him. Voice: Kaneta Kimotsuki
Miko Nanda (南田ミコ)
A 12-year-old sixth grader who first met Chikkun, and in the anime, is the leader of the Kyunkyuns. She is friendly and very popular in her class, but she isn't afraid of getting serious or tough when in danger. In the manga, she is younger, and has brown hair in a bob and a headband, but in the anime she has orange hair in curls and a foxtail headband. Voice: Miina Tominaga
Jitabata Mechatan (ジタバタ・メカタン, Jitabata Mekatan)
Chikkun's royal bodyguard on Star R. He is an enormous, strong robot who can transform into a rocket. Despite his size and strength, he is easygoing and meek with a soft voice. Voice: Naoki Tatsuta
Dr. Bell (ドクター・ベル, Dokutā Beru)
The ambitious, self-proclaimed "Last Great Villain of Star R", who stole the Waruchin with the intent to control planet Earth. Dr. Bell has a bell hanging from the back of his hood, which rings whenever he moves and is his namesake. He has a short temper, usually getting irritated or emotional very easily. He is in love with the Kyunkyuns, particularly with Miko. In the anime, he sometimes ends his sentences with "beru" (bell). Voice: Shigeru Chiba
Gijigiji (ギジギジ)
Dr. Bell's faithful assistant, a robotic spider with great mechanical skill. He is usually quite airheaded and dense, but has a lot of faith in Dr. Bell. On Star R, he has a wife and five children. In the manga, he is painted black, but is red in the anime and says "giji" at the end of his sentences. Voice: Kenichi Ogata
Akira and Futsuko Nanda (南田朗とフツ子, Nanda Akira to Futsuko)
Miko's parents, both of whom are both kindhearted and let Chikkun stay with them. Akira is an architect, shy but protective of his family, and Futsuko is beautiful and runs the household. Voice: Rokurō Naya and Fumi Hirano
The Kyunkyuns (キュンキュンズ, Kyunkyunzu)
Miko's four friends who help Chikkun, all of whom appear in the anime only.

- Maki (マキ): The oldest of the group, Maki is very athletic and tomboyish, even referring to herself with "ore" in Japanese. She usually provides stability for the group. Voice: Chika Sakamoto
- Mukko (ムッコ): A mechanic in training, and the group's science enthusiast. She can be awkward and easily gets crushes on boys. Voice: Naoko Matsui
- Meko (メーコ): A very relaxed, airheaded girl. She wears blue eye shadow and usually keeps her sleeves over her hands. Voice: Yuuko Matsutani
- Moko (モコ): The youngest and most timid member of the group. While she can be very sweet, she is a crybaby, which sometimes gets her into trouble. Voice: Chie Kōjiro

Andre (エンドレ, Endore)
Chikkun's rival, a young millionaire from Star R. Andre is a mockingbird who is always well-dressed and accompanied by an army of crow men. It is implied he visited earth early in the series, disguised as a pretty human boy. Voice: Masako Nozawa
Princess Leah (レイア姫, Reia Hime)
Chikkun's fiancée, from an assigned marriage on Star R. The Waruchin was in her family's collection, and she often sends Chikkun messages of encouragement in his struggle to get it back. Usually, she acts very dainty and refined, but has a short temper. Her name is an intentional play on Princess Leia. Voice: Matsumi Ōshiro
The Menfo (メンフォー号, Menfoo Go)
Chikkun's spaceship, shaped like an upside-down bowl of ramen. It has jet boosters on the bottom that look like eggs. Its name is a combination of "ramen" and "U.F.O."
The Nazumar (ナマズー号, Nazumaa Go)
Dr. Bell's spaceship, which can turn into a submarine and is equipped with the Namazukko Shuttle, a miniature, removable ship. The whole ship is shaped like a bright red catfish. Its name is a combination of "nazuma" (catfish) and "marine."
Waruchin Encyclopedia (ワルチン大事典, Waruchin Daijiten)
A digital book which has had all of the evil on Star R confined to it, according to Chikkun's father, the King. The book can be opened like a laptop computer, is password-locked, and is capable of generating anything its operator wants through holograms and scientific formulas. Voice: Junpei Takiguchi

== Media ==
=== Manga ===
Briefly titled Chikkun's Grand Adventures, the story revolves around a girl named Miko meeting Chikkun, who crash-landed near her house. Dr. Bell and Giji-Giji crashed on Earth not too far away and set about trying to enslave the planet, but are easily deterred by Chikkun and Takkun. The manga ran in several different magazines from 1982 to 1984, but Ishinomori ended the series as soon as the anime was put in progress.

=== Anime ===
Chikkun, Prince of Planet R, goes to Earth with his advisor and bodyguard robot in search of the Waruchin Encyclopedia. The book, when connected to a computer system, is capable of making anything possible. Chikkun lands on earth and falls in love with a girl named Miko, who is the leader of a group of girls called the Kyunkyuns, who befriend him immediately. At the same time, the original thieves of the Waruchin, Dr. Bell and his assistant Giji-Giji, are on Earth and attempting to take over the planet with the Waruchin. Miko, her family, and the Kyunkyuns join to repeatedly stop Dr. Bell.

== Episodes ==
No.	Title	Directed by	Written by	Original release date
1	"The Spring Breeze Rides In On A Gag: Our Alien Arrival"; Transliteration: "Harukaze wa Gyagu ni nori, Osawa ga hoshibito go touchaku" (Japanese: 春風はギャグに乗り おさわが星人ご到着)	Keiji Hayakawa	Yū Yamamoto	April 9, 1984
On a faraway star called R, mad scientist Dr. Bell and his assistant Giji-Giji steal the Waruchin, a computerized book capable of altering reality. The star's prince, Chikkun, hurries after Dr. Bell to retrieve the Waruchin, with his royal advisor Takkun in tow. Chikkun crashlands on the house of 8th grader Miko, and the two become fast friends. Elsewhere, Dr. Bell is extremely envious of Chikkun's proximity to Miko, and floods Tokyo with icebergs.
2	"Appear! Jump! Flower Kyun Attack!!"; Transliteration: "Misemasu! Tobimasu! Hana Kyun Atakku!!" (Japanese: みせます!跳びます!花キュンアタック!!)	Keiji Hayakawa	Yū Yamamoto	April 16, 1984
Miko goes to meet with her group of friends, a girl gang called the Kyunkyuns, and Chikkun tags along. While the girls initially mistake him for a plush doll, they soon learn about Chikkun's plight to retrieve the Waruchin, and become his allies. Dr. Bell attempts to spy on Chikkun, but discovers the Kyunkyuns and falls head over heels for them. Dr. Bell then devises a scheme to kidnap the girls by making the symbols from a weather forecast come to life.
3	"Super Angry Mom! Ikebana Major Panic!!"; Transliteration: "Sūpāmama okoru! Ikebana dai panikku!!" (Japanese: スーパーママ怒る! 生け花大パニック!!)	Yumiko Suda	Yū Yamamoto	April 23, 1984
Miko is still keeping Chikkun and Takkun a secret from her parents, but her father accidentally discovers the alien ship on top of his house. The aliens must remain a secret so Miko's mother will be perfectly calm and collected, as she prepares to enter a heavy machinery Ikebana event. In the meantime, the Kyunkyuns try a new plan to defeat Dr. Bell and keep the peace at the ikebana event.
4	"Girls Through The Phone!? The Tricky Telephone Book Plot"; Transliteration: "Denwa kara gyaru!? Osasoi terehon dai sakusen" (Japanese: 電話からギャル!? お誘いテレホン大作戦)	Keiji Hayakawa	Yukiyoshi Ōhashi	April 30, 1984
Dr. Bell builds a special phone device that allows him to teleport people through corded phones. He uses this to try and kidnap the Kyunkyuns, starting with Moko. Chikkun and Miko hurry to rescue their friends, and to find a way to turn Dr. Bell's invention on himself.
5	"Dr. Bell's Counter-Attack! The Roaring Rock Saw"; Transliteration: "Dr. Beru no dai gyakushū! Nokogiri iwa ni hoeru" (Japanese: Dr.ベルの大逆襲!ノコギリ岩にほえる)	Keiji Hayakawa	Yū Yamamoto	May 7, 1984
While using her telescope, Mukko sees a beautiful boy in a suit and cape in the middle of the night. The Kyunkyuns struggle to find the boy's identity, but at the same time, Dr. Bell kidnaps Miko and takes her to the seaside.
6	"Micro Deathzone! Crazy Major Race"; Transliteration: "Mikuro no kesshiken! Tondemo dai Rēsu" (Japanese: ミクロの決死圏! とんでも大レース)	Keiji Hayakawa	Yū Yamamoto	May 12, 1984
With the Waruchin, Dr. Bell creates a vapor that can shrink anyone or anything it's sprayed on. Dr. Bell uses it to try and kidnap the Kyunkyuns, but a series of mishaps shrink him, Chikkun, and their spaceships.
7	"First Love Disappeared in the Night Fog? It's Not A Sad Dream!!"; Transliteration: "Yogiri ni kieta hatsukoi? Nakaseru yumejan!!" (Japanese: 夜霧にきえた初恋? 泣かせる夢じゃん!!)	Keiji Hayakawa	Yukiyoshi Ōhashi	June 4, 1984
Miko has a school assignment to sew a plush doll for a student art show, but unable to sew, she asks Chikkun to pretend to be a doll that she can submit. Chikkun wins first prize and gets lots of attention from girls, which makes Dr. Bell envious. Dr. Bell makes a female penguin doll named Penko, and brings her and the rest of the plush dolls to life through voodoo, as part of a scheme to lead Miko to a dance party and to break Chikkun's heart.
8	"Messengers From Space! Am I Really Pretty?"; Transliteration: "Uchū kara no shisha! Atashi hontōni kirei?" (Japanese: 宇宙からの使者! あたし本当にきれい?)	Takaya Mizutani	Takeshi Shudo	June 11, 1984
A small, bratty debt collector flies from Star R to Earth in a ship that looks like a giant mecha credit card, looking to collect on a large welfare loan Dr. Bell once took out. If Dr. Bell is unable to pay her back, she may foreclose on the Earth. asks Chikkun and Takkun for their help in turning the debt collector away, and they begrudgingly agree.
9	"Video Surprise! Chaotic Monster Rampage"; Transliteration: "Bideo bikkuri! Ojama kaijū dai abare" (Japanese: ビデオびっくり!おじゃま怪獣大あばれ)	Mitsuru Hongo	Yū Yamamoto	June 18, 1984
A local TV station runs a movie about a Mecha-King Kong, and on opposite sides of the city, Chikkun and Dr. Bell mourn the death of its titular character at the end of the film. Dr. Bell is particularly moved by the movie, and creates a full scale Mecha King Kong. However, just like in the movie, it begins to wreak havoc in Tokyo.
10	"Watch Out Miko: Panic Coaster"; Transliteration: "Miko-chan ayaushi Panikku Kōsutā" (Japanese: ミコちゃんあやうし パニックコースター)	Takaya Mizutani	Hiroshi Toda	June 25, 1984
The Kyunkyuns, and Chikkun and Takkun go to a local amusement park. They run into Dr. Bell disguised as a lost child, which turns out to be a scheme to get to hug the girls. When he is spurned, Dr. Bell uses the Waruchin to turn the amusement park rides the girls ride into dangerous obstacles.
11	"Isn't It Amazing! Terror of the Kissy-Kissy Flowers"; Transliteration: "Sugo~i desu ne! Kyōfu no chūchū hana" (Japanese: スゴ〜イですね! 恐怖のチューチュー花)	Keiji Hayakawa	Yukiyoshi Ōhashi	July 2, 1984
Dr. Bell engineers a flower that kisses anyone who gets close to it. A kiss from the flower then temporarily wipes the person's memory, and makes them want to kiss others. The only member of the Kyunkyuns whom is immune is Moko, who has a cold, and Takkun finds a way to use her germs as an antidote.
12	"The Awful Guy From Outer Space"; Transliteration: "Uchū kara kita iya~na yatsu" (Japanese: 宇宙から来たイヤ〜なやつ)	Keiji Hayakawa	Tokio Tsuchiya	July 13, 1984
Chikkun's father, the King of R, arrives on earth with the young nobleman Andre. They bring a message from Chikkun's future arranged wife, Princess Leah; she makes a declaration promising to marry whoever retrieves the Waruchin, immediately pitting Chikkun against Andre. Elsewhere, Dr. Bell and Giji-Giji accidentally create hundreds of replicas of the Waruchin and must find the real one.
13	"Let It Fly! Radical Auto Racing"; Transliteration: "Buttobase! Hachamecha jidōsha Rēsu" (Japanese: ブッ飛ばせ! ハチャメチャ自動車レース)	Takaya Mizutani	Tokio Tsuchiya	July 20, 1984
Miko's father is preparing his car for a local drag racing event. Upon learning that the race winner will receive a prize, Dr. Bell creates an enormous truck loaded with dirty tricks and enters it into the race. Andre also enters the race with a gold tank, and he and Chikkun must work together to stop Dr. Bell from winning.
14	"Primeval Dinosaur VS Don Frilled Lizard"; Transliteration: "Genshi kyōryū VS erimaki tokagedon" (Japanese: 原始恐竜VSエリマキトカゲドン)	Mitsuru Hongo	Yukiyoshi Ōhashi	July 27, 1984
After a mishap with the Waruchin, Chikkun, Takkun, and Miko are teleported back in time, along with Dr. Bell and Giji-Giji. The group realizes they have been sent back to the prehistoric era, and try to seek out a way back to 1980s Japan. Along the way, they encounter an ancient tribe of humans with a god who looks almost exactly like Giji-Giji, and the tribe begins to treat him like royalty.
15	"Keep Your Hands Off Sweets!"; Transliteration: "Amai mono ni te o dasu na!" (Japanese: 甘い物に手を出すな!)	Shigeru Ōmachi	Yukiyoshi Ōhashi	August 3, 1984
Dr. Bell tries earth cake for the first time, and is immediately enamored with sugary earth goods. He devises a special magnet that pulls in anything with sugar, and crafts a castle made out of cake and candy for himself to live in. Elsewhere, the sugar magnet takes the birthday cake meant for Miko's mother, and Chikkun vows to get it back.
16	"Hell in Waruchin Land"; Transliteration: "Jigoku no Waruchin Rando" (Japanese: 地獄のワルチンランド)	Hiroyuki Yokoyama	Takamoto Hino	August 10, 1984
After Miko's classmate goes to a sports park, Chikkun insists that he and Miko go there too. Dr. Bell and Giji-Giji have crash landed in the same park, and upon seeing Chikkun and Miko, they decide to use the Waruchin to make the park's sports more extreme.
17	"I Can Laugh Too: Mayhem"; Transliteration: "Waratteītomo ōsōdō" (Japanese: 笑っていいとも 大騒動)	Yūsaku Saotome	Haruya Yamazaki	August 17, 1984
Dr. Bell reads about powerful figures in history, and decides he wants to be like a mafia boss. He engineers a special powder that causes anyone it's sprinkled on to become easy-going and experience a laughing fit, with the intent to rob banks. Elsewhere, the King of R sends Chikkun an urgent message to get the Waruchin back, and Chikkun and Andre must team up to stop Dr. Bell.
18	"Startling!! Ghoul Army"; Transliteration: "Dokkiri!! Obake gundan" (Japanese: どっきり!! オバケ軍団)	Shigeru Ōmachi	Shigemitsu Taguchi	August 24, 1984
Dr. Bell and Giji-Giji use the Waruchin to generate holograms of Yōkai and Obake on a darkened public road. The pair use these visions to scare pedestrians, and then steal the purses and money they drop. Chikkun and Takkun investigate the phenomenon after Miko and her mother run afoul of the obake.
19	"Arrival of the Moon River Thief"; Transliteration: "Kaitō mūnribā tōjō" (Japanese: 怪盗ムーンリバー登場)	Akira Shigino	Kenji Terada	August 31, 1984
A cat burglar named the Moon River Thief is striking all throughout Tokyo, so Miko's grandmother sends the family her precious vase to look after. Chikkun meets a little girl named Miyo who seems to be looking for her family, but it turns out she's the Moon River Thief's daughter and his scout for treasures. At the same time, Dr. Bell and Giji-Giji become interested in cat burglary, and create a giant mecha cat.
20	"Great Race to the Other Side of the World"; Transliteration: "Chikyū no ura made dai Rēsu" (Japanese: 地球の裏まで大レース)	Yūsaku Saotome	Junki Takegami	September 7, 1984
A deliveryman from R heads towards Earth with an important present for Chikkun. NASA notices his ship approaching Earth and shoots him down, so Takkun arranges a rescue mission to find the deliveryman. Andre and Dr. Bell, both overhearing that there is treasure from R, each hurry to the deliveryman's crash point in hopes of getting it for themselves.
21	"First Love Was A Terrible Person"; Transliteration: "Hatsukoi no kare wa hidoi hito" (Japanese: 初恋のかれはヒドイ人)	Shigeru Ōmachi	Kenji Terada	September 14, 1984
Dr. Bell uses the Waruchin to get a sniper rifle with darts - which look like small hermit crabs - that go into peoples' ears to alter their emotions. Miko has a crush on Johnny, a soccer player at her school, and bitter about this, Bell uses a dart to make Miko think the boy hates her. Dr. Bell throws the city into chaos, while Chikkun and Miko's family attempt to console her.
22	"I Didn't Expect This!? A Baby"; Transliteration: "Obikai sareta!? Akanbō" (Japanese: 誘かいされた!? 赤ン坊)	Akira Nishimori	Shigemitsu Taguchi	September 21, 1984
Without money to buy food, Dr. Bell and Giji-Giji resort to shoplifting at a supermarket. While making a hurried escape on the Nazumar, they find a small child has accidentally boarded. The local police assume the boy has been intentionally kidnapped, while Dr. Bell tries to babysit the boy before taking him back to his mother.
23	"Waruchin the Endurance"; Transliteration: "Waruchin Za Gaman" (Japanese: ワルチン・ザ・ガマン)	Yūsaku Saotome	Haruya Yamazaki	September 28, 1984
The Waruchin proposes an Olympics-style test of strength that will decide who can own and use it. Giji-Giji recruits Andre and Chikkun to participate in endurance sports against Dr. Bell. In the middle of a packed Tokyo stadium, the three must survive the situations brought to life by the Waruchin.
