= List of High School! Kimengumi episodes =

High School! Kimengumi anime series logo.

This is the list of episodes of High School! Kimengumi, an anime television series based on the manga series of the same name by Motoei Shinzawa. The first TV series aired from October 12, 1985, to September 21, 1987, on Fuji TV and its affiliates. Each episode is about 25 minutes long, and some are split into two unrelated 11-minute segments.

A 51-minute movie by the same title was released by Toei on July 12, 1986. Neither the movie nor the TV series has been licensed for release in any English-speaking country.

A second TV series premiered on January 9, 2026, on the Noitamina programming block on the same channel and its affiliates.

== First TV series (1985-1987) ==
No.	Title	Directed by	Written by	Storyboarded by	Animation directed by	Original release date
1	"I Love Strange Faces. Come Forth! Kimen Flash!"; Transliteration: "Hen na Kao Dāi Suki Deta! Kimen Flash" (Japanese: へんな顔だーいスキ でた!奇面フラッシュ)	Hiroshi Fukutomi	Takao Koyama	Hiroshi Fukutomi	Hiroshi Kanazawa	October 12, 1985
Yui transfers into the school and is introduced to Chie and the Kimengumi.
2	"Top Secret: A Test of Ikari's Sense of Justice"; Transliteration: "Maruhi Ikari no Seigikan Tesuto" (Japanese: 秘(まるひ)いかりの正義感テスト)	Shin Misawa	Takao Koyama	Takeshi Shirato	Hiroshi Kanazawa	October 19, 1985
3	"Aim for Koushien!? Supermen Abnormal Baseball"; Transliteration: "Mezase Kōshien!? Chōjin Hentai Bēsubōru" (Japanese: めざせ甲子園!? 超人変態ベースボール)	Hisaya Takabayashi	Kenji Terada	Akio Yamadera	Hiroshi Kanazawa	October 26, 1985
4	"The Trial Before Winter Vacation"; Transliteration: "Fuyu Yasumi Mae no Shiren" (Japanese: 冬休み前の試練)	Shin Misawa	Shigeru Yanagawa	Makoto Moriwaki	Hiroshi Kanazawa	November 2, 1985
4	"Making a Mid-winter Sick Visit"; Transliteration: "Kanchū Omimai Mōshiagemasu" (Japanese: 寒中お見舞い申しあげます)	Shin Misawa	Shigeru Yanagawa	Shin Misawa	Hiroshi Kanazawa	November 2, 1985
5	"A Beeline to High School! And Sorry for Dropping Out"; Transliteration: "Kōkō Icchokusen! Mō Rakudai wa Gomen da" (Japanese: 高校一直線! もう落第はごめんだ)	Hisaya Takabayashi	Takao Koyama	Akiko Matsushima	Takahisa Ichikawa	November 9, 1985
6	"SPARKLE Flash!! It's the First Year for Both Students and Teacher"; Transliteration: "Pikka Pika!! Seito mo Kyōshi mo Ichinensei" (Japanese: ピッカピカ!! 生徒も教師も一年生)	Shin Misawa	Takao Koyama	Kazunori Tanahashi	Hiroshi Kanazawa	December 7, 1985
6	"Afternoon of the Rebellious Girls"; Transliteration: "Amano Jaku na Onna no Gogo" (Japanese: あまのじゃくな女の午後)	Shin Misawa	Takao Koyama	Kazunori Tanahashi	Hiroshi Kanazawa	December 7, 1985
7	"Ah!! Intramural Basketball Tournament"; Transliteration: "Aa!! Teireberu Kōnai Basuketto Taikai" (Japanese: ああ!!低レベル 校内バスケット大会)	Shigeru Fujikawa	Shigeru Yanagawa	Akiko Matsushima	Takahisa Ichikawa	December 14, 1985
8	"The Terrifying Bicycle Chicken Race"; Transliteration: "Kyōfu no Jitensha Chikin Rēsu" (Japanese: 恐怖の自転車チキンレース)	Takashi Watanabe	Takao Koyama	Makoto Moriwaki	Hatsuki Tsuji	December 21, 1985
8	"Prank Phone Calls You Must Not Imitate"; Transliteration: "Maneshichaikenai Itazura Denwa" (Japanese: マネしちゃいけないイタズラ電話)	Takashi Watanabe	Takao Koyama	Hisaya Takabayashi	Hatsuki Tsuji	December 21, 1985
9	"Embarrassing New Year's Resolutions! New Year's Karuta Tournament"; Transliteration: "Haji no Kakizome! Shinshun Karuta Taika" (Japanese: ハジのかき初め! 新春カルタ大会)	Shin Misawa	Kenji Terada	Akiko Matsushima	Hiroshi Kanazawa	January 4, 1986
9	"Nice to Meet You! Lassie the Strange Dog!?"; Transliteration: "Yoroshiku! Meiken Rasshī!?" (Japanese: よろしく! 迷犬ラッシー!?)	Shin Misawa	Kenji Terada	Shin Misawa	Hiroshi Kanazawa	January 4, 1986
10	"Howl at the Full Moon! Wolfboy Joe!!"; Transliteration: "Mangetsu ni Hoero! Ookami Shōnen no Jō!!" (Japanese: 満月に吠えろ! オオカミ少年のジョー!!)	Hisaya Takabayashi	Shigeru Yanagawa	Hisaya Takabayashi	Hiroshi Kanazawa	January 11, 1986
11	"The Kindness Gag Effect"; Transliteration: "Shinsetsushin no Gyagu Kōka" (Japanese: 親切心のギャグ効果)	Masashi Ikeda	Michiru Shimada	Masashi Ikeda	Hatsuki Tsuji	January 18, 1986
11	"My Body's Frozen! The Decisive Battle on the Snow"; Transliteration: "Mi mo Kooru! Setsujō Daikessen" (Japanese: 身も凍る! 雪上大決戦)	Takashi Watanabe	Michiru Shimada	Kazunori Tanabashi	Hatsuki Tsuji	January 18, 1986
12	"The Century's Proven Intramural Marathon Victory Methods!!"; Transliteration: "Seiki no Kōnai Marason Hisshōhō!!" (Japanese: 世紀の校内マラソン必勝法!!)	Takashi Watanabe	Takao Koyama	Makoto Moriwaki	Hatsuki Tsuji	January 25, 1986
13	"Familiar with Love Comedies? Yui-chan's Boyfriend Application Period"; Transliteration: "Rabukome Shitemasu ka? Yui-chan Koibito Boshūchū" (Japanese: ラブコメしてますか? 唯ちゃん恋人募集中)	Shin Misawa	Michiru Shimada	Shin Misawa	Ken'ichi Chikanaga	February 1, 1986
13	"The Whole Gang Appointed to Assist at the Bath House!"; Transliteration: "Zen'in Sentō Haichi ni Tsuke" (Japanese: 全員銭湯配置につけ!)	Shin Misawa	Kenji Terada	Shin Misawa	Ken'ichi Chikanaga	February 1, 1986
14	"It's a Man's Prerogative!? Bizarro Lassie's Madonna Competition"; Transliteration: "Otoko ha Tsurai yo!? Meiken Rasshī no Madonna Sōdassen!!" (Japanese: 男はつらいよ!? 迷犬ラッシーのマドンナ争奪戦!!)	Takashi Watanabe	Takao Koyama	Hiroshi Fukutomi	Hatsuki Tsuji	February 8, 1986
14	"Like Cutting Valentines"; Transliteration: "Katte ni Barentain" (Japanese: かってにバレンタイン)	Takashi Watanabe	Michiru Shimada	Takaya Mizutani	Hatsuki Tsuji	February 8, 1986
15	"The Tale of Smitten Chie-chan's Early Spring Love"; Transliteration: "Tokimeki Chie-chan Sōshun Ren'ai Ki" (Japanese: ときめき千絵ちゃん早春恋愛記)	Shigeru Fujikawa	Kenji Terada	Shigeru Fujikawa	Hiroshi Kanazawa	February 15, 1986
15	"Rival! Harumage Don Approaches"; Transliteration: "Raibaru! Harumage Don Sekkin" (Japanese: ライバル!春曲鈍接近)	Shigeru Fujikawa	Kenji Terada	Shigeru Fujikawa	Hiroshi Kanazawa	February 15, 1986
16	"Deranged Soccer!? Secret Shuttleloop Reversal Technique"; Transliteration: "Hentai Sakkā!? Gyakuten Higi Shatorurūpu" (Japanese: 変態サッカー!? 逆転秘技シャトルループ)	Takashi Watanabe	Takao Koyama	Takashi Watanabe	Hatsuki Tsuji	February 22, 1986
17	"Spring is the Best!? The Naive, Hot-blooded Teacher Arrives!!"; Transliteration: "Haru Ichiban!? Junjō Nekketsu Sensei ga Yatte Kita!!" (Japanese: 春一番!? 純情・熱血先生がやって来た!!)	Hisaya Takabayashi	Shigeru Yanagawa	Hisaya Takabayashi	Ken'ichi Chikanaga	March 1, 1986
18	"The Troublemaking Transfer Student"; Transliteration: "Hito Sawagase na Tennyūsei" (Japanese: 人さわがせな転入生)	Yoshihiro Takamoto	Kenji Terada	Masashi Ikeda	Hatsuki Tsuji	March 8, 1986
18	"The Epic Funny-face Club Spy Battle"; Transliteration: "Kimen-gumi Supai Taisakusen" (Japanese: 奇面組スパイ大作戦)	Takashi Watanabe	Takao Koyama	Takashi Watanabe	Hatsuki Tsuji	March 8, 1986
19	"Farewell, Gou-kun"; Transliteration: "Saraba Gō-kun" (Japanese: さらば豪くん)	Shin Misawa	Kenji Terada	Shin Misawa	Hiroshi Kanazawa	March 15, 1986
19	"Springtime Totally Strange Examination"; Transliteration: "Haru no Teiki Hentaido Kensa" (Japanese: 春の定期ヘンタイ度検査)	Shin Misawa	Takao Koyama	Shin Misawa	Hiroshi Kanazawa	March 15, 1986
20	"The Omiai Destruction Strategy"; Transliteration: "Omiai Gekimetsu Sakusen" (Japanese: お見合いゲキメツ作戦)	Masashi Ikeda	Shigeru Yanagawa	Yoshiji Kigami	Hatsuki Tsuji	March 22, 1986
20	"Don-chan's Spring Vacation Family Don-chan Outcry"; Transliteration: "Haru Yasumi Don-chan Chi Don-chan Sawagi!" (Japanese: 春休み鈍ちゃん家(ち)ドンチャンさわぎ!)	Takashi Watanabe	Shigeru Yanagawa	Takashi Watanabe	Hatsuki Tsuji	March 22, 1986
21	"Odd Dog Lassie's Lifesaving"; Transliteration: "Meiken Rasshī Jinmei Kyūjo" (Japanese: 迷犬ラッシー人命救助)	Shigeru Fujikawa	Takao Koyama	Shigeru Fujikawa	Hiroshi Kanazawa	March 29, 1986
21	"Rei-kun Is an Annoying Bug!?"; Transliteration: "Rei-kun ha Ojama Mushi!?" (Japanese: 零クンはおじゃま虫!?)	Shigeru Fujikawa	Takao Koyama	Shigeru Fujikawa	Hiroshi Kanazawa	March 29, 1986
22	"The Tale of Loyal Dog Lassie"; Transliteration: "Chūken Rasshī Monogatari" (Japanese: 忠犬ラッシー物語)	Hisaya Takabayashi	Shigeru Yanagawa	Hisaya Takabayashi	Hiroshi Kanazawa	April 12, 1986
22	"Dai Monohoshi: A Spring Transvestite?"; Transliteration: "Monohoshi Dai: Haru na no ni Okama desu ka?" (Japanese: 物星大・春なのにオカマですか?)	Tomomasa Yamazaki	Shigeru Yanagawa	Susumu Ishizaki	Hiroshi Kanazawa	April 12, 1986
23	"Let's Go! Seat-taking Battle Riding the Commuter Train Today, Too"; Transliteration: "Rettsu Gō! Sekitori Kassen Tsūgaku Densha ha Kyō mo Iku" (Japanese: レッツ豪!席取り合戦 通学電車は今日も行く)	Takashi Watanabe	Kenji Terada	Keiji Hayakawa	Hatsuki Tsuji	April 19, 1986
23	"Odd Dog Lassie's Exciting First Year Student"; Transliteration: "Meiken Rasshī no Doki Doki Ichinensei" (Japanese: 迷犬ラッシーのドキドキ一年生)	Takashi Watanabe	Kenji Terada	Keiji Hayakawa	Hatsuki Tsuji	April 19, 1986
24	"Jin Daima's Hurrah for Tasty Little Things"; Transliteration: "Daima Jin Oishinbo Banzai" (Japanese: 大間仁おいしんぼ万才)	Shin Misawa	Takao Koyama	Shin Misawa	Ken'ichi Chikanaga	May 3, 1986
24	"The Library Is in Utter Confusion"; Transliteration: "Toshoshitsu ha Ten'ya Wan'ya" (Japanese: 図書室はてんやわんや)	Shin Misawa	Takashi Yamada	Shin Misawa	Ken'ichi Chikanaga	May 3, 1986
25	"Yui-chan, Beloved Transfer Student"; Transliteration: "Yui-chan Kanashi ya Tenkōsei" (Japanese: 唯ちゃん恋しや転校生)	Hiroshi Fukutomi	Takao Koyama	Masashi Ikeda	Hatsuki Tsuji	May 10, 1986
25	"Kiyoshi Shusse, the Pervert of Justice"; Transliteration: "Seigi no Sukebe Shusse Kiyoshi" (Japanese: 正義のスケベ出瀬潔)	Yoshihiro Takamoto	Takashi Yamada	Yoshihiro Takamoto	Hatsuki Tsuji	May 10, 1986
26	"June Bride: Ikari-sensei's Happy Wedding Ceremony"; Transliteration: "Rokugatsu no Hanayome Ikari-sense no Happī Kekkonshiki" (Japanese: 6月の花嫁 猪狩せんせのハッピー結婚式)	Takashi Watanabe	Kenji Terada	Takashi Watanabe	Hatsuki Tsuji	May 17, 1986
27	"Kiri-chan Is an Honors Student"; Transliteration: "Kiri-chan ha Yūtōsei" (Japanese: 霧ちゃんは優等生)	Shigeru Fujikawa	Takao Koyama	Akiko Matsushima	Hiroshi Kanazawa	May 24, 1986
27	"Jidai-sensei, Legendary Hothead"; Transliteration: "Jidai-sensei Nekketsuden" (Japanese: 事代せんせ熱血伝)	Shigeru Fujikawa	Takao Koyama	Hiroshi Fukutomi	Hiroshi Kanazawa	May 24, 1986
28	"I Really Hate Cake!"; Transliteration: "Kēki nanka Dai Kirai da" (Japanese: ケーキなんか大キライだ)	Makoto Moriwaki	Takao Koyama	Makoto Moriwaki	Mitsuru Nasukawa	May 31, 1986
28	"The Terrible Appendicitis"; Transliteration: "Hisan na Mōchōen" (Japanese: 悲惨な盲腸炎)	Shin Misawa	Takao Koyama	Shin Misawa	Hiroshi Kanazawa	May 31, 1986

No.	Original release date
29	June 14, 1986
30	June 28, 1986
31	July 5, 1986
32	July 12, 1986
33	July 19, 1986
34	August 2, 1986
35	August 9, 1986
36	August 20, 1986
37	August 27, 1986
38	September 9, 1986
39	September 13, 1986
40	September 20, 1986
41	September 27, 1986
42	October 11, 1986
43	October 18, 1986
44	October 25, 1986
45	November 1, 1986
46	November 8, 1986
47	November 15, 1986
48	November 22, 1986
49	November 29, 1986
50	December 6, 1986
51	December 13, 1986
52	December 20, 1986
53	January 3, 1987
54	January 10, 1987
55	January 17, 1987
56	January 24, 1987
57	January 31, 1987
58	February 7, 1987
59	February 14, 1987
60	February 21, 1987
61	February 28, 1987
62	March 7, 1987
63	March 14, 1987
64	March 21, 1987
65	March 28, 1987
66	April 11, 1987
67	April 18, 1987
68	April 25, 1987
69	May 2, 1987
70	May 16, 1987
71	May 23, 1987
72	May 30, 1987
73	June 6, 1987
74	June 13, 1987
75	June 20, 1987
76	June 27, 1987
77	July 4, 1987
78	July 11, 1987
79	July 25, 1987
80	August 1, 1987
81	August 15, 1987
82	August 22, 1987
83	August 29, 1987
84	September 12, 1987
85	September 19, 1987
86	September 26, 1987

== Movie (1986) ==
The Kimengumi movie has only been commercially released on Japanese VHS.

Title	Original release date
"High School! Funny-face Club" Transliteration: "Haisukūru! Kimengumi" (Japanese: ハイスクール!奇面組)	July 12, 1986

== Second TV series (2026) ==
Takashi Nishikawa was credited as episode director on all episodes, though others had co-directed with him.

No.	Title	Directed by (Note: Production staff information is taken from the ending credits of each episode.)	Written by	Storyboarded by	Chief animation directed by	Original release date
1	"Enter Kimengumi!"; Transliteration: "Kimengumi Tōjō!" (Japanese: 奇面組登場!)	Kim Yucheon, Song Geunsik & Kwak Nosu	Shigeru Murakoshi	Takashi Nishikawa	Yuka Abe	January 9, 2026
2	"New Semester: The Ultimate Self-Introduction"; Transliteration: "Shin Gakki・Hissatsu Jiko Shōkai" (Japanese: 新学期・必殺自己紹介)	Gang Chigeun & Gwag Nosu	Shigeru Murakoshi	Takashi Iida	Takashi Nishikawa	January 16, 2026
2	"A Battle Without Rules: Classmates United"; Transliteration: "Rūrunaki Tatakai Kyūyū Kyōtō-hen" (Japanese: ルールなき戦い 級友共闘編)	Gang Chigeun & Gwag Nosu	Makoto Takada	Takashi Iida	Takashi Nishikawa	January 16, 2026
3	"The Gag Effect of Kindness!?"; Transliteration: "Shinsetsushin no Gyagu Kōka!?" (Japanese: 親切心のギャグ効果!?)	Myung Geun Kim	Makoto Takada	Shigenori Kageyama	Takashi Nishikawa & Junji Tanaka	January 23, 2026
3	"Blessings for the Contrarian"; Transliteration: "Amanojaku ni Omegumi wo" (Japanese: あまのじゃくにおめぐみを)	Myung Geun Kim	Makoto Takada	Shigenori Kageyama	Takashi Nishikawa & Junji Tanaka	January 23, 2026
4	"Travel Through Time! The Passionate Teacher"; Transliteration: "Toki o Kakero! Nekketsu Kyōshi" (Japanese: 時をかけろ！熱血教師)	Song Geunsik	Kō Yoneyama	Takashi Iida	Takashi Nishikawa & Junji Tanaka	January 30, 2026
4	"Do You Have Any Bones to Bury, Dai Monohoshi?"; Transliteration: "Monohoshi Dai Uma Uzumeru Hone wa Arimasu ka?" (Japanese: 物星大 うず埋うずめるホネはありますか？)	Song Geunsik	Makoto Takada	Takashi Iida	Takashi Nishikawa & Junji Tanaka	January 30, 2026
5	"The Nemesis, Harumage Don Appears!"; Transliteration: "Shukuteki・Harumage Don Sekkin!" (Japanese: 宿敵・春曲鈍接近！)	Gang Chigeun & Kwak Nosu	Kō Yoneyama	Shigenori Kageyama	Takashi Nishikawa & Junji Tanaka	February 6, 2026
5	"Let's Play Somewhere in the Universe"; Transliteration: "Uchū no doko ka de Asobou yo" (Japanese: 宇宙のどこかで遊ぼうよ)	Jeong Juwang, Song Geunsik & Gim Dohwan	Kō Yoneyama	Shigenori Kageyama	Takashi Nishikawa & Junji Tanaka	February 6, 2026
6	"Squirming Gou-kun"; Transliteration: "Mojimoji Gō-kun" (Japanese: モジモジ豪くん)	Myung Geun Kim	Shigeru Murakoshi	Takashi Nishikawa	Takashi Nishikawa & Junji Tanaka	February 13, 2026
6	"Please Tell me About Marriage"; Transliteration: "Oshiete Kudasai Kekkon no Koto" (Japanese: 教えてください結婚のこと)	Myung Geun Kim	Kō Yoneyama	Junji Tanaka	Takashi Nishikawa & Junji Tanaka	February 13, 2026
7	"Kiri's Hide-and-seek Wars!"; Transliteration: "Kiri no Kakurenbo WARS!" (Japanese: 霧のかくれんぼWARS！)	So Hosung & Moon Taemoon	Kō Yoneyama	Takashi Iida	Takashi Nishikawa & Junji Tanaka	February 20, 2026
7	"Kiyoshi Shusse is Still a Pervert"; Transliteration: "Sore demo Sukebe Shusse Kiyoshi" (Japanese: それでもスケベ 出瀬潔)	So Hosung & Moon Taemoon	Makoto Takada	Takashi Iida	Yuka Abe	February 20, 2026
8	"Seaside Chase"; Transliteration: "Shīsaido Cheisu" (Japanese: シーサイド チェイス)	Song Geunsik	Takashi Nishikawa	Takashi Nishikawa	Takashi Nishikawa, Junji Tanaka, Mizutani Takenori & Yuka Abe	February 27, 2026
8	"Popping Shower on a Midsummer Night"; Transliteration: "Manatsu no Yoru no Poppin Shawā" (Japanese: 真夏の夜のポッピンシャワー)	Song Geunsik	Takashi Nishikawa	Junji Tanaka	Takashi Nishikawa, Junji Tanaka, Mizutani Takenori & Yuka Abe	February 27, 2026
9	"Sleeping Bug Jin-kun"; Transliteration: "Nemuri Mushi Jin-kun" (Japanese: ねむりむし仁くん)	Kim Yucheon	Takashi Nishikawa	Shigenori Kageyama	Takashi Nishikawa, Junji Tanaka, Mizutani Takenori & Yuka Abe	March 6, 2026
9	"Your Home Cooking is....." Transliteration: "Kimi no Teryōri ga……" (Japanese: きみの手料理が……)	Kim Yucheon	Makoto Takada	Shigenori Kageyama	Takashi Nishikawa, Junji Tanaka, Mizutani Takenori & Yuka Abe	March 6, 2026
10	"Let's go on a School Trip"; Transliteration: "Rettsu Gō Shūgaku Ryokō" (Japanese: レッツゴー修学旅行)	So Hosung & Moon Taemoon	Shigeru Murakoshi & Takashi Nishikawa	Takashi Nishikawa & Junji Tanaka	Takashi Nishikawa, Junji Tanaka, Mizutani Takenori & Yuka Abe	March 13, 2026
11	"Kyararell World"; Transliteration: "Kyarareru・Wārudo" (Japanese: キャラレル・ワールド)	Song Geunsik	Kō Yoneyama	Shigenori Kageyama	Takashi Nishikawa, Junji Tanaka, Mizutani Takenori & Yuka Abe	March 20, 2026
12	"The Kimengumi of That Day"; Transliteration: "Ano Hi no Kimengumi" (Japanese: あの日の奇面組)	So Hosung & Moon Taemoon	Shigeru Murakoshi	Takashi Nishikawa & Junji Tanaka	Takashi Nishikawa, Junji Tanaka, Mizutani Takenori & Yuka Abe	March 27, 2026
