= Kiyoshi Sakai =

Japanese television producer

Kiyoshi Sakai (酒井 澄, Sakai Kiyoshi) is a Japanese anime producer and animator. He worked for the animation studio Topcraft, where Hayao Miyazaki and Isao Takahata worked immediately before forming Studio Ghibli in 1985.

== Productions ==
- Flanders no Inu (production direction)
- High School! Kimengumi (producer)
- The Last Unicorn (assistant animation supervisor)
- Nausicaä of the Valley of the Wind (production supervisor)
