= Maruhon =

Japanese manufacturer of pachinko machines

MARUHON INDUSTRY Co., Ltd
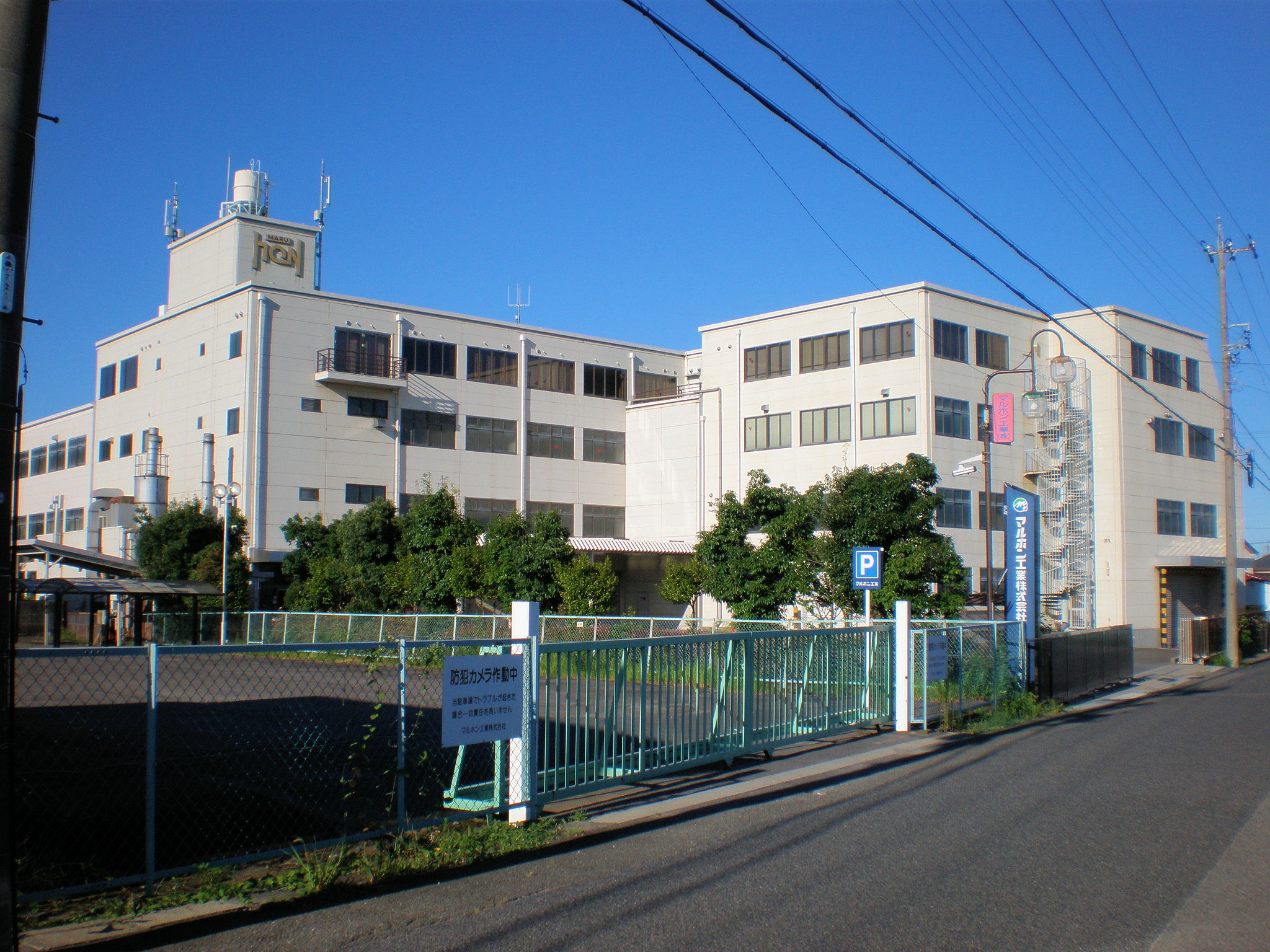
- Headquarter office
- Native name: マルホン工業株式会社
- Founded: 1966; 60 years ago
- Headquarters: Momoyama, Kasugai, Aichi Prefecture, Japan
- Website: www.maruhon-kogyo.co.jp

Maruhon (マルホン工業株式会社, Maruhon Kōgyō Kabushikigaisha) is an entertainment company specializing in the manufacture of pachinko machines. The company is headquartered in Momoyama, Kasugai, Aichi Prefecture, Japan.

== Major models ==
Maruhon has produced a variety of other pachinko models over the years, including traditional upright machines, table-top models, and even pachinko slots.

- Big Porter (1992): This model was one of the first pachinko machines to feature a full-color LCD screen and introduced bonus rounds and other special features that are now common in pachinko parlors.
- Caravan
- Caster
- CR Bikkuriman 2000 (2006): This model was based on the popular Japanese trading card game "Bikkuriman" and featured characters and themes from the game.
- CR High School! Kimengumi (2003)
- CR Kinnikuman (2003)
- CR Segawa Eiko de Gozaimasu (2004)
- CR Umi e Ikō Rakuen Tengoku (2001)
- CR Woody Woodpecker (2004)
- CRE Adventure (2002)
- Fine Play (1994)
- Prism
- Super Fine Play (2002)
