= Justy (manga) =

Manga and direct-to-video anime

- LaserDisc cover of Justy.

ジャスティ (Jasuti)
- Genre: Science fiction
- Manga
- Written by: Tsuguo Okazaki
- Published by: Shogakukan
- English publisher: NA: Viz (partial)
- Magazine: Shōnen Sunday Zōkan
- Original run: August 1981 – November 1984
- Volumes: 5
- Original video animation

Cosmo Police Justy
- Directed by: Motosuke Takahashi
- Produced by: Yūji Nunokawa
- Written by: Hiroyuki Hoshiyama
- Music by: Hiroya Watanabe
- Studio: Pierrot
- Released: July 20, 1985
- Runtime: 44 minutes

Justy (ジャスティ, Jasuti) is a Japanese manga series written and illustrated by Tsuguo Okazaki which ran in Shōnen Sunday Zōkan. It was adapted into an original video animation (OVA) released on July 20, 1985. The OVA was released as a double feature with the Area 88 film.

The story follows Justy Kaizard, a police officer who chases down criminal espers; his tactics might be similar to those of a bounty hunter but he is a salary-drawing officer. Justy is also an esper with remarkable powers. He is able to moderate his psychic forces by the use of the headband that he wears. With this device, which acts only as a psychic damper, he can finely attenuate his powers to prevent collateral damage.

Viz translated part of the manga into English and released nine out-of-order issues in North America between December 6, 1988, and April 4, 1989.

== Plot summary ==
Justy Kaizard is the most powerful esper in the known universe, and he works as a member of the Galaxy Patrol System Cosmo Police to bring down esper criminals. During one such takedown, he killed Magnamum Vega while his young daughter Astaris was watching. After the fight, she transformed from a young girl into a young woman and attacked him. While he was wounded in her attack, she forgot everything. Justy took the girl home and began raising her as his younger sister with the help of Jelna Flarestar.

Because he has brought down over 200 esper criminals since joining the Cosmo Police, the rest of the esper criminals are willing to do anything to get rid of Justy. To this end, they hijack a civilian shuttle transport and demand that Astaris, Magnamum's daughter, be brought in exchange for the passengers on board the transport. Justy is assigned to take her there, but as she is making the EVA journey between ships, a group of the criminal espers joins using telepathy to make her remember what happened to her father and who was responsible for it.

Astaris begins attacking the policeman, destroying Justy's ship and using more and more power to try to break through his defenses. Worried for the safety of the nearby transport, Justy uses his powers to teleport it away from the fight. In doing so, he lets down his guard and Astaris is able to hit him with the full force of her powers, causing him to disappear. The criminal espers believe they have destroyed him, so they take the transport with all the hostages and warp away, leaving Astaris floating in space. Astaris comes out of her rage and begins wondering what happened and where Justy went. She then falls asleep, exhausted. After the shuttle leaves, Justy appears and rescues the sleeping Astaris, promising to bring the criminal espers to justice for using her in their ploy.

After surrounding Astaris in a protective bubble, Justy warps after the escaping transport. On teleporting into the transport, Justy eliminates three of the hijackers before the others teleport in an attempt to escape, and easily follows them. He handily defeats all but four after demanding that they return Astaris to the way she was. The remaining four combine their powers to try to defeat Justy, but he eliminates them one by one until he's down to the ringleader. He tells him that Astaris is his beloved younger sister now, and proceeds to eliminate him.

Justy returns and rescues Astaris, and the voiceover as they return shows that Astaris remembers nothing of her attack on Justy and has returned to loving him as her heroic older brother. The show ends with Justy and his partner going out on another mission.

== Characters ==
The characters of Justy, Jelna, and Bolba previously appeared in Okazaki's debut manga 2nd Year A Class Hoshiko-sensei.

Justy Kaizard (ジャスティ・カイザード, Jasuti Kaizādo)
Born (or at least found in a shipwreck) on Sapphire, the sixth planet in the Pelwing System, Justy is an esper in the Galaxy Patrol Cosmo Police, with the designation Σ04-1 (Sigma 04-1). Despite being the most powerful esper in the known universe, Justy has a kind heart. He helps track down superhuman criminals to bring them to justice, even though it pains him to have to use his powers this way. He wears a hairband which regulates his esper powers to one ten-thousandth their normal strength. The headband would normally completely suppress the power of an esper, but due to the strength of his powers, it allows him greater fine control over them.
During the Great Galactic War, Justy fought alongside Jelna and her group as part of the Esper Commandos against the Andromeda Rebel Army. His foster-sister, Jelna, is his only family, and because of the hardships experienced during the war, they became very close. Justy also cares for Astaris, the daughter of Magnamum Vega, an esper criminal he killed during the course of his duties. He considers her a younger sister, and is very protective of her. Voiced by: Kazuhiko Inoue
Jelna Flarestar (ジェルナ・フレアスター, Jeruna Fureasutā)
Jelna was the first esper employed by the Cosmo Police, though she mostly works at a desk job in the department now. She raised Justy from the time he was quite young, and has a sisterly affection for him. However, because there is no blood relation between the two, romantic feelings have begun to manifest themselves.
After esper powers began manifesting themselves across the galaxy, Jelna defeats the leader of the Andromeda Rebel Army while leading her Esper Commandos unit during the fighting in the Great Galactic War, perishing in so doing. Voiced by: Keiko Yokozawa
Astaris Vega (アスタリス・ベガ, Asutarisu Bega)
Astaris is the daughter of the esper criminal Magnamum Vega. After seeing her father killed by Justy when she was five years old, her desire for revenge was so great that it activated the latent esper powers within her, causing her body to age rapidly into that of a young woman ("One of these days I'll be big and strong and I'll kill you!"). She retains the mentality of her actual age, however. She doesn't remember what happened to her father, or that Justy was the one who killed him. She is technically the prisoner of Jelna, and Justy has taken on the responsibility of raising her, treating her as a favorite younger sister. Because her esper powers are so great, she also wears a headband which dampens them.
She meets Yoshiko Tachibana during Justy's second mission to the Earth. Voiced by: Miina Tominaga
Rector (レクター, Rekutā)
The commandant of the Galaxy Patrol Cosmo Police Space Station Office. He is the one who gives orders to Justy. Voiced by: Norio Wakamoto
Bolba (ボルバー・シークレン, Borubā Shīkuren)
A member of the Cosmo Police, designation Σ03-1 (Sigma 03-1). He's like an older brother to Justy, and has a very cheerful personality. Despite having a Sigma designation, he has little or no esper powers, but helps in the investigation of esper-related incidents. In the Viz comic translations, his name is Trevor. Voiced by: Kenichi Ono
Yoshiko Tachibana (立花美子, Tachibana Yoshiko)
A school girl from Japan and member of First Year A-Class at Yumeno Academy. She has a cheerful disposition and is a member of the Hygiene Committee there.

== Media ==
=== Manga ===
CP Σ04-1 (Cosmo Police Sigma 04-1), the first chapter in the story, was published in the August 1981 issue of Shōnen Sunday Zōkan as a standalone story. Okazaki then continued the story with manga published monthly from November 1981 through September 1984. There were editorial disputes over the storyline with some of the Shogakukan editors, however, so when the story went out of print through Shogakukan, the manga was published through the gravure idol magazine Scola.

The series was collected into five tankōbon volumes under the title Justy (ジャスティ, Jasuti) in Japan, and the equivalent of about two of them were released in English by Viz in nine badly-translated, out-of-order comic book releases. (Note: The Viz releases were in the standard 6 1/2-by-10 1/4-inch (170 mm × 260 mm) comic book format.) as one of their early translations. The last issue, The Blue Witch, was released on April 4, 1989. The manga didn't fare well due to being too similar to English-language space comics. Viz also changed the names of some of the characters.

In the July 15, 2009 issue of Shōnen Sunday, a column titled "Shōnen Sunday 1983" had an interview with Okazaki as well as an updated version illustration of Justy.

==== Japanese releases ====
Shōnen Sunday Comics imprint from Shogakukan

- Volume 1, ISBN 978-4-09-120751-7, October 1982
- Volume 2, ISBN 978-4-09-120752-4, January 1983
- Volume 3, ISBN 978-4-09-120753-1, October 1983
- Volume 4, ISBN 978-4-09-120754-8, April 1984
- Volume 5, ISBN 978-4-09-120755-5, September 1984

Burger SC imprint from Scola

- Volume 1, ISBN 978-4-7962-4084-0, December 1990
- Volume 2, ISBN 978-4-7962-4087-1, January 1991
- Volume 3, ISBN 978-4-7962-4093-2, February 1991
- Volume 4, ISBN 978-4-7962-4099-4, March 1991
- Volume 5, ISBN 978-4-7962-4105-2, April 1991

=== Anime ===
Studio Pierrot released a single 44-minute OVA, titled Cosmo Police Justy (Cosmo Police ジャスティ, Kosumo Porīsu Jasuti), on July 20, 1985, directed by Motosuke Takahashi, the director of the Fire Tripper OVA. In addition to the voices listed in the character section, other voice actors providing additional voices in the OVA include Michihiro Ikemizu (Magnumam Vega), Daisuke Gōri, Hōchū Ōtsuka, Kōzō Shioya, Tomohiro Nishimura, Fumihiko Tachiki, Masashi Sugawara, and Matsumi Ōshiro.

The OVA is partly based on two stories from the comics: The Tears of Astaris, listed in the first page of the English comic book publications as volumes one and two, and also Hostages which is listed as volumes four and five. It was released as a double feature with the Area 88 film.

In the July 1985 issue of Shōnen Sunday Zōkan included a 50-page insert about the OVA. The anime has not been released in English due to the high licensing costs.

==== Soundtracks ====
There were several singles and albums released containing music from the OVA:

- Lonely Hunter (孤独の戦士(ロンリー・ハンター), Ronrī Hantā), EP, K07S-3071, July 21, 1985, Starchild
  - Includes the image song Putting Love into Memories (想い出に愛をこめて, Omoide ni Ai o Komete), also sung by Asakura
- Justy: Drama Edition (ジャスティ〜ドラマ編, Jasuti: Doramahen), (Note: "Drama" albums are the full soundtrack (the movie without the video).) LP, K25G-7269, 1985, Starchild
  - There is also a cassette tape release of the drama edition: K25H-4292
- Justy Music Edition (ジャスティ 音楽集, Jasuti Ongakuhen), LP, K25G-7267, 1985, Starchild
  - There is also a cassette tape release of the music edition: K25H-4277
- Justy Original Album (ジャスティ オリジナル・アルバム, Jasuti Orijinaru Arubamu), LP, K28-7219, 1984, Starchild
  - There is also a cassette tape release of the original album: K28H-4230

== Reception ==
Justin Sevakis, in a review of the OVA for Anime News Network, had mixed feelings about it. He stated the OVA had a "heavy over-the-top cheese factor", but said "the film is one that simply can't be dismissed entirely." He especially liked the ending theme song, performed by Miki Asakura, calling it a "[guilty] pleasure", and pointed out that Astaris was the "closest any character ever got to being moë in 1985".

Fred Patten called the Justy manga one of the "best" of a new (in 1984) group of manga influenced by Locke the Superman which featured "lone-wolf teenage space heroes who possess unusual talents".

The backgrounds of the manga were compared by Jason Thompson to those used by Ryōichi Ikegami in his manga. Thompson also wrote that Okazaki's "characters' childlike, cute faces [foretold] the anime style of the 1980s." Thompson also mentioned the out-of-order release of the few English-language chapters. Helen McCarthy gave it two-and-a-half stars (out of five) in her The Anime! Movie Guide review book.

The Encyclopedia of Science Fiction described Justy as a moderately entertaining original video animation (OVA), praising some of its science fiction backgrounds but criticizing its simplistic plot and characterization. It argued that the adaptation suffered from condensing material from a much larger manga series into a single short film, leaving the narrative insufficiently developed. The encyclopedia also considered the protagonist excessively powerful, noting that his ability to overcome multiple adversaries with little difficulty undermined dramatic tension and made the story less engaging. It additionally noted the presence of fan service and the portrayal of various psychic abilities, including telepathy, telekinesis and teleportation.
