= Hōchū Ōtsuka =

Japanese voice actor and narrator

- 大塚 芳忠
- Born: Yoshitada Ōtsuka
- Occupations: Voice actor; narrator
- Years active: 1976–present
- Agent: Crazy Box
- Spouse: Kazuko Yanaga
- Website: Official profile

Hōchū Ōtsuka (大塚 芳忠, Ōtsuka Hōchū; born Yoshitada Ōtsuka [same kanji]) is a Japanese voice actor and narrator affiliated with the talent management firm Crazy Box.

He is best known for his voice roles as Kyao Mirao in Heavy Metal L-Gaim, Mont Blanc Noland in One Piece, Yazan Gable in Mobile Suit Zeta Gundam, Akira Sendō in Slam Dunk, SignalMan in Gekisou Sentai Carranger, Imagin, Deneb in Kamen Rider Den-O, Abuto in Gintama, Makoto Sōda in Captain Tsubasa, Jiraiya in Naruto, Junjirō Takagi in The Idolmaster, Dr. Ni Jianyi in Saiyuki, and Sakonji Urokodaki in Demon Slayer: Kimetsu no Yaiba. He is also known for being a dubbing voice for Jean-Claude Van Damme, Donnie Yen (especially in Ip Man series), Jeff Goldblum, Ray Liotta, Richard Jenkins, John C. McGinley, Brent Spiner, Greg Kinnear and many more. He also served as the first dubbing voice actor of Kiefer Sutherland and Christopher Lambert in their early days.

== Filmography ==
=== Television animation ===
Year	Title	Role	Notes	Refs
1983	Captain Tsubasa	Makoto Sōda		
1983	Urusei Yatsura	Kuroko, Man in Glasses		
1984	Heavy Metal L-Gaim	Mirauu Kyao		
1985	Dirty Pair	DJ's Voice	Episode 5	
1985	High School! Kimengumi	Nihiruda Yo, Kanzenji Ai		
1985	Mobile Suit Zeta Gundam	Yazan Gable		
1986	Mobile Suit Gundam ZZ	Yazan Gable		
1986	Fist of the North Star	Aus, David		
1987	Metal Armor Dragonar	Tapp Oseano		
1987	Transformers: The Headmasters	Ultra Magnus, Crosshairs, Wingspan, Ratbat, Deer Stalker		
1988	Transformers: Super-God Masterforce	Ranger		
1988	Anpanman	Katsubushiman		
1989	Transformers: Victory	Gaihawk		
1989	Ranma ½	Gindo		
1989	Yawara! A Fashionable Judo Girl	Announcer		
1992	Aah! Harimanada	Katsumi Shidenkai		
1993	Slam Dunk	Akira Sendoh, Norio Hotta		
1993	Yaiba	Kotarou		
1993	Nintama Rantarō	Furusawa, Jinnoshin		
1994	Mobile Fighter G Gundam	Chibodee Crocket		
1995	Neon Genesis Evangelion	Shiro Tokita	Episode 7	
1995	My Sexual Harassment	Niimi		
1996	Detective Conan	Kikuji Bancho, Shochiro Hitomi, Takehiko Hitomi, Katsuo Nabeshima		
1996	Rurouni Kenshin	Tokisada Mutō		
1998	Cowboy Bebop	Session 17, Younger Shaft Brother		
1998	Pocket Monsters	Kyō (Koga)		
1998	Kurogane Communication	Cleric		
1999	Zoids: Chaotic Century	Gunther Prozen		
1999	The Big O	Jason Beck		
1999	Turn A Gundam	Gavane Gooney		
2000	Gensomaden Saiyuki	Doctor Ni Jianyi		
2000	Vandread	Tenmei Uragasami; AKA, Buzam A. Calessa "BC"		
2000	Brigadoon: Marin & Melan	Melan Blue		
2000	Kazemakase Tsukikage Ran	Takagaki Koujiro	Episode 11	
2001	Noir	Krode Freddi		
2001	Figure 17	Isamu Kuroda		
2001	Earth Maiden Arjuna	Bob		
2001	Kaze No Yojimbo	Samekichi Shirogane		
2002	RahXephon	Masayoshi Kuki		
2003	Naruto	Jiraiya		
2003	Sonic X	Red Pine		
2003	Yukikaze	Karl Gunow		
2003	Tantei Gakuen Q	Taiki Yoshinari		
2003	Texhnolyze	Kohagura Fuminori		
2003	Kino's Journey	Riku		
2003	Saiyuki Reload	Doctor Ni Jianyi		
2004	Saiyuki Reload Gunlock	Doctor Ni Jianyi		
2004	One Piece	Montblanc Norland		
2004	Bleach	Metastacia, Glass-wearing ghost	Episode 1	
2004	Samurai Champloo	Jouji		
2005	Akagi	Kurata Group's dealer	Episode 14	
2005	Blood+	George Miyagusuku		
2005	Full Metal Panic!: The Second Raid	Gates		
2005	Solty Rei	Hou Chuu		
2005	Gallery Fake	Roger Warner		
2006	009-1	Number Zero		
2006	Ergo Proxy	Proxy One		
2006	Coyote Ragtime Show	Bruce Dochley		
2006	Sgt. Frog	Nevara		
2006	Yu-Gi-Oh! Duel Monsters GX	X		
2007	Naruto Shippuden	Jiraiya		
2007	Fist of the Blue Sky	Zhang Tai-Yan		
2007	Claymore	Orsay		
2007	Nodame Cantabile	Miyoshi Takehiro		
2007	Monster Princess	Dracul		
2007	Blue Dragon	Killer Bat		
2008	Spice and Wolf	Marlheit		
2008	Soul Eater	Little Ogre		
2008	Kamen no Maid Guy	Gold Fish Miyatsuguchi	Episode 11	
2008	Kannagi	Head Maid Cafe Owner	Episode 6	
2008	Birdy the Mighty: Decode	Kinzel Hower		
2008	Golgo 13	AX-3	Episode 14	
2009	Gintama	Abuto		
2009	Saki	Kazue Nanpo's Grandfather		
2009	The Sacred Blacksmith	August Arthur		
2009	Shangri-La	Mi-Ko		
2009	Sōten Kōro	Dong Zhuo		
2010	Durarara!!	Narrator (Ep 12.5); Haruya Shiki (Ep 15)	Narrator of TV program - DVD only	
2010	Arakawa Under the Bridge	Toru "Shiro" Shiroi		
2010	Working!!	Mahiru's father		
2010	Panty & Stocking with Garterbelt	Ghost	Episode 4	
2011	Kaitou Kid	Snake		
2011	The Idolmaster	Junjirō Takagi		
2012	Love, Chunibyo & Other Delusions	Narrator		
2012	Star Blazers: Space Battleship Yamato 2199	Shirō Sanada		
2013	Doki Doki! Precure	King Jikochu		
2013	Maoyu	Crusader Commander		
2013	Sasami-san@Ganbaranai	Kamiomi Tsukuyomi		
2014	Kamigami no Asobi	Zeus Keraunos (adult)		
2015	Chaos Dragon	Red Dragon		
2015	K: Return of Kings	Tenkei Iwafune		
2015	Durarara!!x2	Haruya Shiki		
2016	Ajin: Demi-Human	Satō		
2016	91 Days	Galassia		
2016	D.Gray-man Hallow	Bookman		
2017	The Saga of Tanya the Evil	Hans von Zettour		
2017	Berserk	Laban	Season 2	
2017	Alice & Zoroku	Ryū Naitō		
2017	Love Tyrant	God		
2017	March Comes in Like a Lion	Sakutarō Yanagihara	Season 2	
2017	Restaurant to Another World	Tatsugorou		
2018	Pop Team Epic	Pipimi	Episode 1-A	
2018	Golden Kamuy	Lieutenant Tsurumi		
2018	Angels of Death	Abraham Gray		
2018	A Certain Magical Index III	Terra of the Left		
2018	That Time I Got Reincarnated as a Slime	Hakuro		
2018	Baki the Grappler	Biscuit Oliva		
2018	Zombie Land Saga	Master		
2019	Revisions	Nicholas Satō		
2019	Demon Slayer: Kimetsu no Yaiba	Sakonji Urokodaki		
2019	Fairy Gone	Marco Bellwood		
2019	Boruto: Naruto Next Generations	Jiraiya		
2019	Cop Craft	Zerada		
2019	Isekai Quartet	Hans von Zettour		
2019	Yōjo Senki: Saga of Tanya the Evil II	Hans von Zettour		
2019	Carole & Tuesday	Hofner		
2019	Bungo Stray Dogs 3	Natsume Sōseki		
2019	The Legend of the Galactic Heroes: Die Neue These Seiran	Murai		
2019	Levius	Malcolm Eden		
2020	BNA: Brand New Animal	Prime Minister Shiramizu		
2020	Listeners	Field Marshal Ace		
2020	Tower of God	Headon		
2020	Transformers: War for Cybertron Trilogy	Megatron		
2020	The Misfit of Demon King Academy	Melheis Boran		
2020	Baki	Biscuit Oliva		
2020	Bungou to Alchemist: Shinpan no Haguruma	Taint		
2021	That Time I Got Reincarnated as a Slime	Hakuro	2nd Season	
2021	The Slime Diaries: That Time I Got Reincarnated as a Slime	Hakuro		
2021	Mushoku Tensei: Jobless Reincarnation	Talhand		
2021	Edens Zero	Ziggy		
2021	Odd Taxi	Donraku Shofutei		
2021	The Duke of Death and His Maid	Rob		
2021	Life Lessons with Uramichi Oniisan	The Voice of God		
2021	Restaurant to Another World 2	Tatsugorou		
2021	Fena: Pirate Princess	Yukihisa Sanada		
2021	Blade Runner: Black Lotus	Earl Grant		
2022	Love of Kill	Donny		
2022	Requiem of the Rose King	Narrator		
2022	Teasing Master Takagi-san 3	Narrator		
2022	The Eminence in Shadow	Ruslan Barnett		
2022	The Little Lies We All Tell	Narrator		
2022	Saiyuki Reload: Zeroin	Ni Jianyi		
2022	Ya Boy Kongming!	Tsuyoshi Kondo		
2022	Black Summoner	Guildmaster		
2023	A Herbivorous Dragon of 5,000 Years Gets Unfairly Villainized	Evil Dragon Ravendia	Japanese dub	
2023	My Daughter Left the Nest and Returned an S-Rank Adventurer	Graham		
2023	The Idolmaster Million Live!	Junjirō Takagi		
2023	Dark Gathering	Alien Doll Spirit		
2023	A Playthrough of a Certain Dude's VRMMO Life	Igraon		
2024	'Tis Time for "Torture," Princess	Jimochi		
2024	Go! Go! Loser Ranger!	Peltrola		
2024	Dungeon People	Renfringe		
2024	Suicide Squad Isekai	The Thinker		
2024	Wistoria: Wand and Sword	Aron Masterias Old King		
2024	Murai in Love	Narrator		
2025	City the Animation	Narrator		
2025	I Got Married to the Girl I Hate Most in Class	Tenryu Hojo		
2025	Ishura	Romzo of the Star Map	Season 2	
2025	From Bureaucrat to Villainess: Dad's Been Reincarnated!	Headmaster		
2025	Sakamoto Days	Takamura	Also narrator	
2025	Toilet-Bound Hanako-kun	Kako	Season 2	
2025	Umamusume: Cinderella Gray	Ginjirō Musaka		
2025	Lazarus	Committee Chairman		
2025	The Water Magician	Lewin		
2025	Witch Watch	Fuwa		
2025	Ninja vs. Gokudo	Kaiza Akiba		
2026	Nippon Sangoku	Momokuni Hojo		
2026	Akane-banashi	Miroku Kashiwaya		
2026	Dara-san of Reiwa	Orochi		
2026	Tank Chair	Ryo Takanashi		

=== OVA/ONA ===
Year	Title	Role	Notes	Refs
1989	Shin Captain Tsubasa	Makoto Soda and Hermann Kaltz		
1989–1995	Legend of the Galactic Heroes	Kahle Willock	6 episodes	
1991	Dance till Tomorrow	Daisuke Ikezu		
1994	The Irresponsible Captain Tylor	Barusarōmu		
1995	3×3 Eyes	Jake McDonald		
1995	Gunsmith Cats	Bill Collins		
1996	Teenage Mutant Anime Turtles	Leonardo		
1998	Blue Submarine 6	Alexander David Cekeros		
1998	Giant Robo: The Day the Earth Stood Still	Gen	Episode 7	
1998	DinoZone	Dino Stego		
2005	Last Order: Final Fantasy VII	Martial Artist Turk		
2007	Saiyuki Reload: Burial	Ni Jianyi		
2007	Hellsing Ultimate	Tubalcain Alhambra		
2007–2008	Kamen Rider Den-O: Collection DVD: Imagin Anime	Deneb		
2012	Space Battleship Yamato 2199	Shiro Sanada		
2021	Cute Executive Officer	Bakery Manager		
2021	The Way of the Househusband	Boss		
2022	Tekken: Bloodline	Paul Phoenix		
2023	Onimusha	Kensuke Matsui		
2024	Gundam: Requiem for Vengeance	Rolph Ronet		
2024	Tokyo Override	Kageyama		
2026	Love Through a Prism	Charles Brant		

=== Theatrical animation ===
Year	Title	Role	Notes	Refs
1984	Nausicaä of the Valley of the Wind	Tolmekian soldier		
1993	Bonobono	Sunadori Neko-san		
1994	Yu Yu Hakusho the Movie: Poltergeist Report	Kuronue	aka Meikai Shitou Hen - Hono no Kizuna	
1996	Tenchi the Movie: Tenchi Muyo in Love	Sabato		
2000	Vampire Hunter D: Bloodlust	Kyle		
2002	Turn A Gundam I: Earth Light	Gavane Gooney		
2004	Mobile Suit Zeta Gundam A New Translation I: Heir to the Stars	Yazan Gable		
2005	Mobile Suit Zeta Gundam A New Translation II: Lovers	Yazan Gable		
2006	Mobile Suit Zeta Gundam A New Translation III: Love is the Pulse of the Stars	Yazan Gable		
2007	Fist of the North Star	Shuh		
2012	After School Midnighters	Fred		
2012	One Piece Film: Z	Zephyr/Z		
2015	Ajin Part 1: Shōdō	Satō		
2016	Ajin Part 2: Shōtotsu	Satō		
2016	Ajin Part 3: Shōgeki	Satō		
2016	Doraemon: Nobita and the Birth of Japan 2016	Gigazonbi		
2016	Kizumonogatari II Nekketsu-hen	Guillotinecutter		
2018	Batman Ninja	Alfred Pennyworth		
2019	City Hunter the Movie: Shinjuku Private Eyes	Vince Ingrado		
2019	Saga of Tanya the Evil: The Movie	Hans von Zettour		
2019	Crayon Shin-chan: Honeymoon Hurricane ~The Lost Hiroshi~			
2022	That Time I Got Reincarnated as a Slime the Movie: Scarlet Bond	Hakuro		
2023	Black Clover: Sword of the Wizard King	Edward		
2024	Mobile Suit Gundam SEED Freedom	Alexei Konoe		
2025	The Rose of Versailles	Louis XV		
2025	Batman Ninja vs. Yakuza League	Alfred Pennyworth		
2025	Dream Animals: The Movie	King Gotton		
2026	Armored Trooper VOTOMS: Die Graue Hexe	Vid Hildebrandt		

=== Tokusatsu ===
Year	Title	Role	Notes	Refs
1996	Gekisou Sentai Carranger	Signalman		
2007	Kamen Rider Den-O	Deneb/Kamen Rider Zeronos Vega Form		
2007	Kamen Rider Den-O: I'm Born!	Deneb/Kamen Rider Zeronos Vega Form		
2008	Kamen Rider Den-O & Kiva: Climax Deka	Deneb/Kamen Rider Zeronos Vega Form		
2011	Kaizoku Sentai Gokaiger	Signalman		
2011	Gokaiger Goseiger Super Sentai 199 Hero Great Battle	Signalman		
2013	Kamen Rider Gaim	Narrator		
2018–2019	Kamen Rider Zi-O	Deneb/Kamen Rider Zeronos Vega Form		
2019	Super Sentai Strongest Battle	Signalman (Non Credit)		

=== Live-action ===
Year	Title	Role	Notes	Refs
2022	Chimudondon	College professor		

=== Video games ===
Year	Title	Role	Notes	Refs
1996	Enemy Zero	George		
1997	Mobile Suit Gundam Side Story: The Blue Destiny	Alph Kamra		
1998	Panzer Dragoon Saga	Gash		
1998	JoJo's Bizarre Adventure	Young Joseph Joestar		
1998	Street Fighter Alpha 3	Dee Jay		
1999	Future GPX Cyber Formula: A New Challenger	AKF-0/1B Nemesis		
2000	Midnight Club: Street Racing	Darren Thurrock		
2000	Gunparade March	Hisaomi Sakagami		
2001	Armored Core 2: Another Age	Emeraude		
2002	Panzer Dragoon Orta	Gash		
2004	Gungrave: Overdose	Rocketbilly Redcadillac		
2004	Super Robot Wars GC	Mirawoo Kyao, Tapp Oceano		
2004	Tales of Rebirth	Walto		
2005	Quantum Leap Layzelber	Layzer/Layzelber/Dailayzer		
2005	Kingdom Hearts II	Xigbar		
2005	Destroy All Humans!	Orthopox 13		
2005	Kingdom of Paradise	Lei Gai		
2005	New Century Brave Wars	Layzer		
2005	Sly 3: Honor Among Thieves	Captain LeFwee		
2005	Super Robot Wars Alpha 3	Yazan Gable		
2006	Captain Tsubasa	Makoto Sōda, Hermann Kaltz		
2008	Tales of Symphonia: Dawn of the New World	Tenebrae		
2008	Super Robot Wars Z	Yazan Gable, Gavane Goonny, Jason Beck		
2008	Super Robot Wars A Portable	Chibodee Crocket, Tapp Oceano		
2008	White Knight Chronicles	Dregiaz		
2009	Kamen Rider: Climax Heroes	Kamen Rider Zeronos Vega Form		
2009	Kingdom Hearts 358/2 Days	Xigbar		
2010	Kingdom Hearts Birth by Sleep	Braig		
2010	Zangeki no Reginleiv	Odin		
2010	Yakuza 4	Kazuo Shibata		
2010	Metal Gear Solid: Peace Walker	Ramón Gálvez Mena		
2011	Kikokugai -Reichin Rinrinshan-	Ng Wing Shing		
2011	Tales of Xillia	Nachigal I. Fan		
2011	Tales of Xillia 2	Nachigal I. Fan		
2011	Call of Duty: Modern Warfare 3	Nikolai	Japanese-dub release version	
2011	The Idolmaster 2	Junjirou Takagi		
2011	Super Robot Wars Z2: Destruction Chapter	Jason Beck, Gates		
2012	Super Robot Wars Z2: Rebirth Chapter	Jason Beck, Gates		
2012	Kid Icarus: Uprising	Chariot Master, Hades		
2012	Kingdom Hearts 3D: Dream Drop Distance	Braig/Xigbar		
2012	E.X. Troopers	Kreis Ravel		
2012	Project X Zone	Meden Traore		
2012	Call of Duty: Black Ops	Viktor Reznov	Japanese-dub release version	
2012	Bravely Default: Flying Fairy	Barras Lehr		
2013	Bravely Default: For the Sequel	Barras Lehr		
2013	JoJo's Bizarre Adventure: All-Star Battle	Hol Horse		
2013	Kamen Rider: Battride War	Callas		
2013	Kamen Rider: Battride War	Karasu/Susumu Karashima		
2014	Super Robot Wars Z3: Hell Chapter	Jason Beck, Gates		
2015	Super Robot Wars Z3: Heaven Chapter	Jason Beck, Gates		
2015	Yakuza 0	Kazuo Shibata		
2015	Bravely Second	Barras Lehr		
2015	Lego Jurassic World	Dr. Ian Malcolm	Japanese-dub release version	
2015	Metal Gear Solid V: The Phantom Pain	Evangelos Constantinou		
2016	Mighty No. 9	Countershade		
2016	Fate/Grand Order	Rider of Resistance/Christopher Columbus		
2016	Sengoku BASARA Sanada Yukimura-den	Sanada Masayuki		
2017	The Legend of Heroes: Trails of Cold Steel III	Rutger Claussell		
2017	Super Robot Wars V	Yazan Gable, Gates, Shiro Sanada		
2018	Super Robot Wars X	Yazan Gable		
2018	Valkyria Chronicles 4	Phoenix		
2019	Kingdom Hearts III	Davy Jones, Xigbar/Luxu		
2019	Death Stranding	Heartman		
2019	Super Robot Wars T	Yazan Gable, Chibodee Crocket		
2020	Nioh 2	Kashin Koji		
2022	Triangle Strategy	Travis		
2023	Resident Evil 4	Osmund Saddler		
2024	Emio - The Smiling Man: Famicom Detective Club	Kimiharu Kamada		
2025	Super Robot Wars Y	Yazan Gable, Chibodee Crocket		
2025	Death Stranding 2: On the Beach	Heartman		
2025	The Hundred Line: Last Defense Academy	SIREI		

== Dubbing roles ==
=== Voice-double ===
Original Year	Title	Role	Original actor	Notes	Ref(s)
1986	Howard the Duck	Phil Blumburtt	Tim Robbins	1990 Fuji TV edition	
1987	Star Trek: The Next Generation	Data	Brent Spiner		
1987	No Way Out	Tom Farrell	Brent Spiner		
1987	The Untouchables	Eliot Ness	Brent Spiner		
1987	Spaceballs	Lone Starr	Bill Pullman		
1988	A Fish Called Wanda	Otto West	Kevin Kline		
1989	Kickboxer	Kurt Sloane	Jean-Claude Van Damme		
1990	Arachnophobia	Ross	Jeff Daniels		
1992	Consenting Adults	Richard Parker	Kevin Kline		
1992	Once Upon a Time in China II	Nap-lan Yun-seut	Donnie Yen		
1992	Bob Roberts	Bob Roberts	Tim Robbins		
1992	Universal Soldier	Luc Deveraux / GR44	Jean-Claude Van Damme		
1993	Nowhere to Run	Sam Gillen	Jean-Claude Van Damme		
1993	Jurassic Park	Dr. Ian Malcolm	Jeff Goldblum		
1994	Escape from Absolum	John Robbins	Ray Liotta		
1994	I.Q.	Ed Walters	Tim Robbins		
1994	The Shawshank Redemption	Andy Dufresne	Tim Robbins		
1994	Speed	Harry	Jeff Daniels		
1994	Star Trek Generations	Data	Brent Spiner		
1994	The War	Stephen Simmons	Kevin Costner		
1995	Waterworld	The Mariner	Kevin Costner		
1995	Casper	Dr. James Harvey	Bill Pullman	2004 DVD edition	
1995	While You Were Sleeping	Jack Callaghan	Bill Pullman		
1996	Maximum Risk	Alain Moreau / Mikhail Suverov	Jean-Claude Van Damme		
1996	Star Trek: First Contact	Data	Brent Spiner		
1996	Fly Away Home	Thomas Alden	Jeff Daniels		
1996	Independence Day	David Levinson	Jeff Goldblum		
1997	The Lost World: Jurassic Park	Dr. Ian Malcolm	Jeff Goldblum		
1997	Double Team	Jack Paul Quinn	Jean-Claude Van Damme		
1997	Cop Land	Gary Figgis	Ray Liotta		
1997	Turbulence	Ryan Weaver	Ray Liotta		
1997	Nothing to Lose	Nick Beam	Tim Robbins		
1997	Breakdown	Jeff Taylor	Kurt Russell		
1997	Fierce Creatures	Rod McCain / Vince McCain	Kevin Kline		
1997	In & Out	Howard Brackett	Kevin Kline		
1998	Star Trek: Insurrection	Data	Brent Spiner		
1998	Holy Man	Ricky Hayman	Jeff Goldblum		
1999	Wild Wild West	Artemus Gordon / Ulysses S. Grant	Kevin Kline	2002 NTV edition	
1999	For Love of the Game	Billy Chapel	Kevin Costner		
1999	Universal Soldier: The Return	Luc Deveraux	Jean-Claude Van Damme		
2001	Hannibal	Paul Krendler	Ray Liotta		
2001	Heartbreakers	Dean Cumanno	Ray Liotta		
2001	Antitrust	Gary Winston	Tim Robbins		
2001	Ignition	Conor Gallagher	Bill Pullman		
2001	Cats & Dogs	Professor Brody	Jeff Goldblum		
2002	Igby Goes Down	D.H. Banes	Jeff Goldblum		
2002	Star Trek: Nemesis	Data	Brent Spiner		
2002	Derailed	Jacques Kristoff	Jean-Claude Van Damme		
2003	Friends	Leonard Hayes	Jeff Goldblum		
2003	Identity	Samuel Rhodes	Ray Liotta		
2004	The Last Shot	Jack Devine	Ray Liotta		
2005	Zathura: A Space Adventure	Mr. Budwing	Tim Robbins	2008 NTV edition	
2005	Sky High	Steve Stronghold / The Commander	Kurt Russell		
2008	In the Name of the King	Gallian	Ray Liotta		
2008	Ip Man	Ip Man	Donnie Yen		
2009	Universal Soldier: Regeneration	Luc Deveraux	Jean-Claude Van Damme		
2010	Ip Man 2	Ip Man	Donnie Yen		
2011	Assassination Games	Vincent Brazil	Jean-Claude Van Damme		
2012	Dragon Eyes	Tiano	Jean-Claude Van Damme		
2012	Six Bullets	Samson Gaul	Jean-Claude Van Damme		
2012	U.F.O.	George	Jean-Claude Van Damme		
2013	Welcome to the Jungle	Storm Rothchild	Jean-Claude Van Damme		
2013	Special ID	Dragon Chan	Donnie Yen		
2014	Kung Fu Jungle	Hahou Mo	Donnie Yen		
2014	The Monkey King	Sun Wukong	Donnie Yen		
2014	Jean-Claude Van Johnson	Johnson / Jean-Claude Van Damme	Jean-Claude Van Damme		
2015	Ip Man 3	Ip Man	Donnie Yen		
2015	Furious 7	Mr. Nobody	Kurt Russell		
2015	Mortdecai	Krampf	Jeff Goldblum		
2016	Independence Day: Resurgence	David Levinson	Jeff Goldblum		
2016	Shades of Blue	Lieutenant Matt Wozniak	Ray Liotta		
2016	Kickboxer: Vengeance	Master Durand	Jean-Claude Van Damme		
2017	Kill 'Em All	Philip	Jean-Claude Van Damme		
2017	Thor: Ragnarok	Grandmaster	Jeff Goldblum		
2017	The Fate of the Furious	Mr. Nobody	Kurt Russell		
2017	xXx: Return of Xander Cage	Xiang	Donnie Yen		
2017	Chasing the Dragon	Crippled Ho	Donnie Yen		
2018	Big Brother	Henry Chen Xia / Chen Hak	Donnie Yen		
2018	Iceman: The Time Traveller	Ho Ying	Donnie Yen		
2018	Jurassic World: Fallen Kingdom	Dr. Ian Malcolm	Jeff Goldblum		
2019	The World According to Jeff Goldblum	Jeff Goldblum	Jeff Goldblum		
2020	Ip Man 4: The Finale	Ip Man	Donnie Yen		
2020	Enter the Fat Dragon	Fallon Zhu	Donnie Yen		
2021	Raging Fire	Cheung Sung-bong	Donnie Yen		
2021	The Last Mercenary	Richard Brumère / The Mist	Jean-Claude Van Damme		
2021	F9	Mr. Nobody	Kurt Russell		
2021	What If...?	Grandmaster	Jeff Goldblum		
2021	The Boss Baby: Family Business	Dr. Erwin Armstrong	Jeff Goldblum		
2022	Jurassic World Dominion	Dr. Ian Malcolm	Jeff Goldblum		
2023	John Wick: Chapter 4	Caine	Donnie Yen		
2024	Wicked	The Wonderful Wizard of Oz	Jeff Goldblum		
2024	Kill 'Em All 2	Philip	Jean-Claude Van Damme		
2025	Wicked: For Good	The Wonderful Wizard of Oz	Jeff Goldblum		

=== Live-action ===
Original Year	Title	Role	Original actor	Notes	Ref(s)
1914	Dough and Dynamite	Pierre	Charlie Chaplin	2014 Star Channel edition	
1915	His New Job	Film Extra	Charlie Chaplin	2014 Star Channel edition	
1946	Gilda	Ballin Mundson	George Macready		
1960	The Magnificent Seven	Chris Adams	Yul Brynner	2013 Star Channel edition	
1961	West Side Story	Tony	Richard Beymer	1990 TBS edition	
1973	Enter the Dragon	Williams	Jim Kelly		
1974	American Graffiti	Disc Jockey	Wolfman Jack	2011 Blu-Ray edition	
1974–1984	Little House on the Prairie	Dr. Hiram Baker	Kevin Hagen	2019 NHK BS4K edition	
1978	Jaws 2	Len Peterson	Joseph Mascolo	2022 BS Tokyo edition	
1980	The Young Master	Master Kam	Hwang In-shik		
1982	Dragon Lord	The Big Boss	Hwang In-shik		
1984	Dune	Feyd-Rautha	Sting		
1984	Wheels on Meals	Mondale	José Sancho		
1985	Day of the Dead	Dr. Matthew Logan	Richard Liberty	2020 Blu-ray edition	
1985	Missing in Action 2: The Beginning	Corporal Lawrence Opelka	Joe Michael Terry		
1986	Cobra	Detective Monte	Andrew Robinson		
1986	Platoon	Elias Gordon	Willem Dafoe	1998 DVD edition	
1986	Lucky Stars Go Places	Pagoda / Ginseng	Michael Miu		
1986	Highlander	Connor MacLeod / Russell Nash	Christopher Lambert		
1987	Predator	Jorge "Poncho" Ramírez	Richard Chaves	1993 TV Asahi edition	
1987	The Living Daylights	James Bond	Timothy Dalton	2006 DVD edition	
1987	Evil Dead II	Ash Williams	Bruce Campbell	1991 TV Tokyo edition	
1987–1995	Full House	Danny Tanner	Bob Saget		
1988	Working Girl	Mick Dugan	Alec Baldwin		
1989	Casualties of War	Corporal Thomas E. Clark	Don Harvey		
1989	Licence to Kill	James Bond	Timothy Dalton	2006 DVD edition	
1990	Predator 2	Agent Keyes	Gary Busey		
1990	Predator 2	Agent Adam Garber	Adam Baldwin	1994 TV Asahi edition	
1990	Die Hard 2	Colonel William Stuart	William Sadler		
1990	Flatliners	David Labraccio	Kevin Bacon	1996 NTV edition	
1990	Ghost	Carl Bruner	Tony Goldwyn		
1990	The Hunt for Red October	Jack Ryan	Alec Baldwin	1993 TBS edition	
1990	Jacob's Ladder	Michael Newman	Matt Craven	1993 NTV edition	
1990	Internal Affairs	Officer Van Stretch	William Baldwin		
1991	Billy Bathgate	Bo Weinberg	Bruce Willis		
1991	The Doors	Ray Manzarek	Kyle MacLachlan		
1992	A Few Good Men	Captain Jack Ross	Kevin Bacon		
1992	Jennifer 8	Special Agent St. Anne	John Malkovich		
1992	Rapid Fire	Jake Lo	Brandon Lee		
1992	Twin Peaks: Fire Walk with Me	James Hurley/Phillip Jeffries	James Marshall/David Bowie		
1992	Malcolm X	Shorty	Spike Lee		
1992	A League of Their Own	Jimmy Dugan	Tom Hanks		
1992	Bram Stoker's Dracula	Count Dracula	Gary Oldman	15th Anniversary DVD edition	
1993	Blood In Blood Out	Montana Segura	Enrique Castillo		
1993	Cool Runnings	Derice Bannock	Leon Robinson	1998 NTV edition	
1993	Guilty as Sin	David Greenhill	Don Johnson		
1993	Hard Target	Pik Van Cleef	Arnold Vosloo	1997 Fuji TV edition	
1993	Wayne's World 2	Robert G. Cahn	Christopher Walken		
1994	Natural Born Killers	Wayne Gale	Robert Downey Jr.		
1994	Baby's Day Out	Veeko Riley	Brian Haley		
1995	Heat	Chris Shiherlis	Val Kilmer		
1995	Judge Dredd	Herman Fergusson	Rob Schneider		
1995	A Little Princess	Captain Richard Crewe	Liam Cunningham		
1995	Mad Love	Clifford Leland	Kevin Dunn		
1995	Nick of Time	Mr. Smith	Christopher Walken		
1995	Sense and Sensibility	John Willoughby	Greg Wise		
1995	Something to Talk About	Eddie Bichon	Dennis Quaid		
1995	Virtuosity	SID 6.7	Russell Crowe		
1995	Die Hard with a Vengeance	Zeus Carver	Samuel L. Jackson	1999 TV Asahi edition	
1995–1996	ER	Ray "Shep" Shepard	Ron Eldard		
1996	Bulletproof	Rock Keats / Jack Carter	Damon Wayans		
1996	Fargo	Carl Showalter	Steve Buscemi	2002 TV Tokyo edition	
1997	The Fifth Element	Korben Dallas	Bruce Willis		
1997	Speed 2: Cruise Control	John Geiger	Willem Dafoe	2000 Fuji TV edition	
1997	Welcome to Sarajevo	Jimmy Flynn	Woody Harrelson		
1997	Con Air	Cameron Poe	Nicolas Cage	2000 TV Asahi edition	
1998	Dangerous Beauty	Marco Venier	Rufus Sewell		
1998	Dark City	Dr. Daniel P. Schreber	Kiefer Sutherland		
1998	Elizabeth	Robert Dudley	Joseph Fiennes		
1998	Fallen	Detective John Hobbes	Denzel Washington		
1998	From the Earth to the Moon	Jim Lovell	Tim Daly		
1998	The Man in the Iron Mask	Athos	John Malkovich		
1998	The Mask of Zorro	Captain Harrison Love	Matt Letscher		
1998	The Negotiator	Chris Sabian	Kevin Spacey	2001 TV Asahi edition	
1998	Shakespeare in Love	Lord Wessex	Colin Firth		
1998	A Simple Plan	Hank Mitchell	Bill Paxton		
1998	The Wedding Singer	Sammy	Allen Covert		
1998	Blackjack	Rory Gaines	Phillip MacKenzie		
1999	Virus	J. W. Woods Jr.	Marshall Bell	2002 NTV edition	
1999	The World Is Not Enough	Davidov	Ulrich Thomsen	2003 TV Asahi edition	
1999	Boys Don't Cry	John Lotter	Peter Sarsgaard		
1999	Deep Blue Sea	Carter Blake	Thomas Jane		
1999	Double Jeopardy	Nick Parsons	Bruce Greenwood		
1999	EDtv	Ed Pekurny	Matthew McConaughey		
1999	The Muse	Steven Phillips	Albert Brooks		
1999	The Thirteenth Floor	Douglas Hall, John Ferguson, David	Craig Bierko		
1999–2003	The Matrix trilogy	Agent Smith	Hugo Weaving	Fuji TV edition	
2000	Frequency	Jack Shepard	Shawn Doyle	2003 NTV edition	
2000	The Gift	Wayne Collins	Greg Kinnear		
2000	Gone in 60 Seconds	Raymond Calitri	Christopher Eccleston		
2000	Mission: Impossible 2	Sean Ambrose	Dougray Scott		
2000–2002	The X-Files	Investigator John Doggett	Robert Patrick		
2001	Ocean's Eleven	Terry Benedict	Andy García	2005 Fuji TV edition	
2001	The Tailor of Panama	Andy Osnard	Pierce Brosnan		
2001	Ticker	Ray Nettles	Tom Sizemore		
2001	The Animal	Doug Sisk	John C. McGinley		
2001	Antichrist	He	Willem Dafoe		
2001	Black Hawk Down	SFC Jeff Sanderson	William Fichtner	2004 TV Tokyo edition	
2001	Domestic Disturbance	Rick Barnes	Vince Vaughn		
2001	Don't Say a Word	Patrick Koster	Sean Bean		
2001–2003	The Lord of the Rings film trilogy	Aragorn	Viggo Mortensen		
2002	Reign of Fire	Denton Van Zan	Matthew McConaughey		
2002	28 Days Later	Major Henry West	Christopher Eccleston		
2002	Confessions of a Dangerous Mind	Keeler	Rutger Hauer		
2002	Cube 2: Hypercube	Simon Grady	Geraint Wyn Davies		
2002	Liberty Stands Still	Victor Wallace	Oliver Platt		
2003	Touching the Void	Joe Simpson	Himself/Brendan Mackey		
2003	Underworld	Lucian	Michael Sheen		
2003	Bad Santa	Gin	Bernie Mac		
2003	Beyond Borders	Dr. Nick Callahan	Clive Owen		
2003	The Core	Dr. John Keyes	Aaron Eckhart		
2003	Identity	Larry Washington	John Hawkes	2007 TV Tokyo edition	
2004	The Chronicles of Riddick	Lord Marshal	Colm Feore		
2004	Envy	Tim Dingman	Ben Stiller		
2004	The Forgotten	Dr. Jack Munce	Gary Sinise		
2004	Ladder 49	Leonard "Lenny" Richter	Robert Patrick		
2004	Ocean's Twelve	Baron François Toulour	Vincent Cassel		
2004	Ocean's Twelve	Terry Benedict	Andy García	2007 NTV edition	
2004	Paparazzi	Rex Harper	Tom Sizemore		
2004	Saw	Doctor Lawrence Gordon	Cary Elwes		
2004	Secret Window	John Shooter	John Turturro		
2004	Troy	Odysseus	Sean Bean		
2004	Van Helsing	Count Dracula	Richard Roxburgh		
2004–2011	Desperate Housewives	Paul Young	Mark Moses		
2005	Batman Begins	Jim Gordon	Gary Oldman	2008 Fuji TV edition	
2005	The Big White	Paul Barnell	Robin Williams		
2005	The Island	Dr. Merrick	Sean Bean		
2005	Kingdom of Heaven	Guy de Lusignan	Marton Csokas		
2005	Syriana	Jimmy Pope	Chris Cooper		
2006	Stick It	Burt Vickerman	Jeff Bridges		
2006	Stormbreaker	Darrius Sayle	Mickey Rourke		
2006	The Black Dahlia	Detective Lee Blanchard	Aaron Eckhart		
2006	Eragon	Galbatorix	John Malkovich		
2006	The Last Time	Ted Riker	Michael Keaton		
2006	Seraphim Falls	Gideon	Pierce Brosnan		
2006	Slither	Grant Grant	Michael Rooker		
2006	Pirates of the Caribbean: Dead Man's Chest	Davy Jones	Bill Nighy		
2007	Pirates of the Caribbean: At World's End	Davy Jones	Bill Nighy		
2007	The Beckoning Silence	Joe Simpson			
2007	Hannibal Rising	Vladis Grutas	Rhys Ifans		
2007	The Hitcher	John Ryder	Sean Bean		
2007	Ocean's Thirteen	Terry Benedict	Andy García	2010 Fuji TV edition	
2008	10,000 BC	Tic'Tic	Cliff Curtis	2011 TV Asahi edition	
2008	Get Smart	Vice President	Geoff Pierson	2011 TV Asahi edition	
2008	Che	Fidel Castro	Demián Bichir		
2008	The Curious Case of Benjamin Button	Thomas Button	Jason Flemyng		
2008	The Dark Knight	Joker	Heath Ledger	2012 TV Asahi edition	
2009	The Men Who Stare at Goats	Larry Hooper	Kevin Spacey		
2009	Underworld: Rise of the Lycans	Lucian	Michael Sheen		
2009	Space Buddies	Dr. Finkel	Kevin Weisman		
2009	12 Rounds	Miles Jackson	Aidan Gillen		
2010	Clash of the Titans	Draco	Mads Mikkelsen		
2010	Clash of the Titans	Hades	Ralph Fiennes	2012 TV Asahi edition	
2010	The Expendables	James Munroe	Eric Roberts		
2010	Green Zone	Clark Poundstone	Greg Kinnear		
2010	Machete	Von Jackson	Don Johnson		
2010	Tron: Legacy	Alan Bradley	Bruce Boxleitner		
2010	Saw 3D	Doctor Lawrence Gordon	Cary Elwes		
2011	War Horse	Lyons	David Thewlis		
2011	The Cabin in the Woods	Gary Sitterson	Richard Jenkins		
2011	Le Havre	Marcel Marx	André Wilms		
2012	Snow White and the Huntsman	Duke Hammond	Vincent Regan		
2012	Ted	Thomas Murphy	Matt Walsh		
2013	Red 2	Jack Horton	Neal McDonough		
2013	World War Z	Captain Speke	James Badge Dale		
2013	Admission	Mark	Michael Sheen		
2013–2023	The Blacklist	Raymond "Red" Reddington	James Spader		
2014	Boyhood	Bill Welbrock	Marco Perella		
2014	Edge of Tomorrow	Master Sergeant Farell	Bill Paxton		
2014	Annie	Guy	Bobby Cannavale		
2014	A Most Wanted Man	Tommy Brue	Willem Dafoe		
2015	Ted 2	Shep Wild	John Slattery		
2016	The Hollars	Don Hollar	Richard Jenkins		
2016	By Way of Helena	Abraham Brant	Woody Harrelson		
2016–2020	Fuller House	Danny Tanner	Bob Saget		
2017	Get Out	Jim Hudson	Stephen Root		
2017	Gifted	Aubrey Highsmith	John Finn		
2018	Green Book	Frank "Tony Lip" Vallelonga	Viggo Mortensen		
2018	Mortal Engines	Thaddeus Valentine	Hugo Weaving		
2018–2022	Killing Eve	Konstantin Vasiliev	Kim Bodnia		
2019	Knives Out	Richard Drysdale	Don Johnson		
2020	Black Beauty	John Manly	Iain Glen		
2020	Dolittle	Dr. Blair Müdfly	Michael Sheen		
2021	Crisis	Dean Talbot	Greg Kinnear		
2021	Dune	Gurney Halleck	Josh Brolin		
2021	Tom & Jerry	Mr. DuBros	Rob Delaney		
2022	Thirteen Lives	Richard Stanton	Viggo Mortensen		
2022-present	House of the Dragon	Ser Otto Hightower	Rhys Ifans		
2024	Dune: Part Two	Gurney Halleck	Josh Brolin		
2024	Megalopolis	Fundi Romaine	Laurence Fishburne		

=== Animation ===
Original Year	Title	Role	Original actor	Notes	Ref(s)
1990–1996	Captain Planet and the Planeteers	Captain Planet, Narrator	David Coburn		
1999	The Iron Giant	Kent Mansley	Christopher McDonald		
2000–2001	Buzz Lightyear of Star Command	Warp Darkmatter	Diedrich Bader		
2005	Chicken Little	Don Bowowser	Harry Shearer		
2008–2013	Chuggington	Hanzo	Dai Tabuchi		
2009	Up	Alpha the Doberman	Bob Peterson		
2011	Arthur Christmas	Steven "Steve" Claus	Hugh Laurie		
2011	Cars 2	Finn McMissile	Michael Caine		
2011	Hop	Carlos	Hank Azaria		
2018	Early Man	Lord Nooth	Tom Hiddleston		
2019	Playmobil: The Movie	Bloodbones	Kenan Thompson		
2020	Scoob!	Dick Dastardly	Jason Isaacs		
2023	Carl's Date	Alpha the Doberman	Bob Peterson		
2024	The Lord of the Rings: The War of the Rohirrim	Lord Thorne	Jude Akuwudike		
2025	Smurfs	Ron	Kurt Russell		

=== Other Japanese ===
Attraction	Location	Role	Ref(s)
Pirates of the Caribbean	Tokyo Disneyland	Davy Jones	

== Awards ==
Year	Award	Category	Work	Result
2017	11th Seiyu Awards	Best Supporting Actor	Ajin: Demi-Human	Won
