= Hiroshi Izawa =

Japanese actor

Toshihisa Izawa (伊澤 俊久, Izawa Toshihisa, born September 4, 1955), better known by his stage name Hiroshi Izawa (伊沢 弘, Izawa Hiroshi), is a Japanese actor, voice actor and director.

Izawa was born in Tokyo, Japan and is the director of the theatrical troupe Big Face, and a member of Theater Echo. He appeared with fellow Theater Echo member Chihoko Shigeta in the popular "Itadakimasu Gekijō" segment of Raion no Itadakimasu on Fuji TV. Izawa has chaired organizations including the World Music Festival of Peace, the Yomiuri Giants Fan Appreciation Day, and the Tokyo International Marathon.

== History ==
In 1979, Izawa joined Theater Echo, performing in many stage productions through 1988. In 1985, he began performing in works produced by Yasutaka Tsutsui, becoming Tsutsui's top choice for any role. Beginning in 1995, Izawa helped organize "Tsutsui World," even taking it to Los Angeles in 1996. From 2001 to 2002, Izawa performed in the Theater X production of Dario Fō no Bikkuri Hako. He then went on to direct the new Warau Onna. Warawareru Otoko series, writing the scripts as well.

== Commercial work ==
Izawa has starred in commercials for Casio, Dariko, Idemitsu, Kobayashi Pharmaceuticals, Suntory, Aione and Ajinomoto. He has also narrated various materials for Kodansha, Marubeni, Toyota, Taisei Rotec, Tokyo Gas, Otsuka Corporation, Manulife, Lion Corporation, NTT Docomo, and Calpis.

== Anime ==
=== TV ===
- High School! Kimengumi (2001-2005) - Kō Irooto, Ken Akiresu

=== Film ===
- 11 Piki no Neko (1980 version)
- Urusei Yatsura Movie 1: Only You (1983) - Announcer
- BOM!
- Choudenshi Bioman (1984) - Metzler
- Tsushimamaru: Sayonara Okinawa
- The Wings of Honneamise (1987) - Darigan

=== Tokusatsu ===
- Choudenshi Bioman (1984) - Mettzler (ep. 1 - 49)
- Kyodai_Ken_Byclosser (1985) - Togebara (ep. 11)
- Chouseishin Gransazer (2004) - Alien Stone Lamon/Koujirou Kanuma (ep. 30)

== Live action films ==
- Sasurai no Trouble Buster

== Radio ==
- Heisei Yawa
- Izawa Hiroshi no Uta Demae

== Theatre ==
- Dario Fō no Bikkuri Hako

Warau Onna. Warawareru Otoko series (script, director)

== TV drama ==
- Aoi Hanabi
- Futari de Dango o
- Gokusen
- Hamidashi Keiji
- Ii Hito.
- Kyōshi Binbin Monogatari?
- Magician Keiji
- Shiawase Zukuri
- Shin Omizu no Hanamichi
- Tengoku no Daisuke e

== TV variety shows ==
- Itadakimasu

== Video ==
- Box 39
- Shizuka Naru Don 7
