= Matsumi Ōshiro =

Japanese voice actress

Matsumi Ōshiro (大城 松美, Ōshiro Matsumi) is a Japanese voice actress. She retired in the 1990s.

== Anime ==
=== TV ===
- High School! Kimengumi (Shumi Monozuki)
- City Hunter 2 (Seiko (ep. 21))
- Maison Ikkoku (misc voices (ep.40))
- Urusei Yatsura (Kotori-chan, Nozomi (ep.180), girl (ep.187), misc voices from ep.164 on)

=== OVA ===
- Bari Bari Densetsu (unknown)

=== Movies ===
- Cosmo Police Justy (unknown)
