= Motoei Shinzawa =

Japanese manga artist

- Born: 新沢 基栄; June 10, 1958 Kashiwazaki, Niigata Prefecture, Japan
- Area: Manga
- Notable works: High School! Kimengumi series

Motoei Shinzawa (新沢 基栄, Shinzawa Motoei) is a Japanese manga artist born June 10, 1958, in Kashiwazaki, Niigata Prefecture, Japan.

His debut manga was Sannen Kimengumi, published in Weekly Shōnen Jump beginning in 1980. After Sannen ended in 1982, he began publishing High School! Kimengumi, also in Weekly Shōnen Jump, until 1987. Highschool was a smash hit, and an animated version was begun in 1985, running for two years on Fuji TV, along with a movie in 1986 and two video games. His next manga series was I'm Shitataka (僕はしたたか君, Boku wa Shitataka-kun), which ran from 1988 through 1990. After Shitataka, Shinzawa took a break from publishing manga until 2001, when his current series, Flash! Kimengumi began.

== Reception ==
Shinzawa's High School! Kimengumi has been called "the funniest manga I have ever read" by Michael Gombos, director of Asian marketing for Dark Horse.
