= High School! Kimengumi =

Japanese manga series

- Manga volume 1 cover

ハイスクール!奇面組 (Hai Sukūru! Kimengumi)
- Manga

Third Year Funny-face Club
- Written by: Motoei Shinzawa
- Published by: Shueisha
- Imprint: Jump Comics
- Magazine: Weekly Shōnen Jump
- Original run: October 13, 1980 – April 12, 1982
- Volumes: 6
- Manga
- Written by: Motoei Shinzawa
- Published by: Shueisha
- Imprint: Jump Comics
- Magazine: Weekly Shōnen Jump
- Original run: April 19, 1982 – July 6, 1987
- Volumes: 20
- Anime television series
- Directed by: Hiroshi Fukutomi
- Produced by: Hiromichi Mogaki; Kazuo Harada; Kiyoshi Sakai; Yoshiro Kataoka
- Written by: Katsuhiko Chiba; Kenji Terada; Michiru Shimada; Naruhisa Arakawa; Shigeru Yanagawa; Takao Koyama; Takashi Yamada
- Music by: Shunsuke Kikuchi
- Studio: Tsuchida Production (1–7); Studio Comet
- Licensed by: NA: Remow
- Original network: FNS (Fuji TV)
- Original run: October 12, 1985 – September 26, 1987
- Episodes: 86
- Anime film
- Directed by: Makoto Moriwaki (part 1); Shin Misawa (part 2); Hiroshi Fukutomi (part 3)
- Produced by: Hiromichi Mogaki; Kazuo Harada; Yoshiro Kataoka
- Written by: Takao Koyama; Motoei Shinzawa
- Music by: Shunsuke Kikuchi
- Studio: Studio Comet
- Released: July 12, 1986
- Runtime: 51 minutes
- Manga

Return of High School! Funny-face Club
- Written by: Motoei Shinzawa
- Published by: Magazine House Ltd. (magazine); Shueisha (volume)
- Imprint: Jump Comics Deluxe
- Magazine: Popeye
- Published: December 1, 2000
- Volumes: 1
- Manga

Flash! Funny-face Club
- Written by: Motoei Shinzawa
- Published by: Square Enix
- Imprint: Gangan Comics
- Magazine: Monthly Shōnen Gangan
- Original run: October 2001 – June 2005
- Volumes: 3
- Anime television series
- Directed by: Kazuaki Seki; Takashi Nishikawa
- Written by: Shigeru Murakoshi
- Music by: Taku Iwasaki
- Studio: Seven
- Licensed by: NA: Amazon Prime Video
- Original network: FNS (Fuji TV)
- Original run: January 9, 2026 – March 27, 2026
- Episodes: 12 (20 segments)
- icon

High School! Kimengumi (Japanese: ハイスクール!奇面組, Hepburn: Hai Sukūru! Kimengumi; lit. 'High School! Funny-face Club') is a Japanese manga series written and illustrated by Motoei Shinzawa. The first series, Third Year Funny-face Club, was serialized in Shueisha's Weekly Shōnen Jump from October 1980 to April 1982. High School! Kimengumi was serialized in the same magazine from April 1982 to July 1987. An anime television series aired from October 1985 to September 1987, and an animated film premiered in July 1986. A sequel manga, titled Flash! Funny-face Club, was published in Square Enix's Monthly Shōnen Gangan from 2001 to 2005. A second anime television series adaptation produced by Seven aired from January to March 2026.

== Summary ==
Cast shot from High School! Kimengumi

High School! Kimengumi is an episodic chronicle of the bizarre adventures of a group of misfit junior high school (and later high school) boys who form a club known as the "Kimengumi". All of the character names in the series are puns. For example, "Kawa Yui" is another way of saying "kawaii", and "Uru Chie" is a slang form of "urusai", meaning "obnoxious" or "annoying".

== Media ==
=== Manga ===
Return of High School! Kimengumi

Written and illustrated by Motoei Shinzawa, High School! Kimengumi started as a series titled Sannen Kimengumi (3年奇面組; "Third Year Funny-face Club"), which was published in Shueisha's Weekly Shōnen Jump from October 13, 1980, to April 12, 1982. Shueisha collected its chapters into six tankōbon volumes published between August 15, 1981, and January 8, 1983.

High School! Kimengumi was serialized in Weekly Shōnen Jump from April 19, 1982, to July 6, 1987. Shueisha collected its chapters into twenty tankōbon volumes published between April 8, 1983, and February 10, 1988.

Another manga titled Return of High School! Kimengumi (帰ってきたハイスクール!奇面組, Kaettekita Haisukūru! Kimengumi; Return of High School! Funny-face Club) was published in Popeye on December 1, 2000. Shueisha later released it in a single volume on February 4, 2004.

A fourth manga, titled Flash! Kimengumi (フラッシュ!奇面組, Furasshu! Kimengumi; Flash! Funny-face Club), was serialized in Square Enix's Monthly Shōnen Gangan from October 2001 to June 2005. It was compiled into three tankōbon volumes published from July 22, 2002, to July 22, 2005.

==== Volume list ====
===== Third Year Funny-face Club =====
No.	Release date	ISBN
01	August 15, 1981	4-08-851341-X
02	November 15, 1981	4-08-851342-8
03	March 15, 1982	4-08-851343-6
04	July 15, 1982	4-08-851344-4
05	October 8, 1982	4-08-851345-2
06	January 8, 1983	4-08-851346-0

===== High School! Funny-face Club =====
No.	Release date	ISBN
01	April 8, 1983	4-08-851347-9
02	July 8, 1983	4-08-851348-7
03	October 7, 1983	4-08-851349-5
04	December 8, 1983	4-08-851350-9
05	February 10, 1984	4-08-851351-7
06	April 10, 1984	4-08-851352-5
07	July 10, 1984	4-08-851353-3
08	December 7, 1984	4-08-851354-1
09	March 8, 1985	4-08-851355-X
10	March 8, 1985	4-08-851356-8
11	September 10, 1985	4-08-851357-6
12	February 10, 1986	4-08-851358-4
13	May 9, 1986	4-08-851359-2
14	August 8, 1986	4-08-851360-6
15	December 5, 1986	4-08-851365-7
16	February 10, 1987	4-08-851366-5
17	April 10, 1987	4-08-851367-3
18	August 10, 1987	4-08-851368-1
19	August 10, 1987	4-08-851369-X
20	February 10, 1988	4-08-851370-3

===== Return of High School! Funny-face Club =====
No.	Release date	ISBN
01	February 4, 2004	4-0885-9419-3

===== Flash! Funny-face Club =====
No.	Release date	ISBN
01	July 22, 2002	4-7575-0735-6
02	July 22, 2003	4-7575-0981-2
03	July 22, 2005	4-7575-1475-1

=== Anime ===
A 86-episode anime television series adaptation produced by NAS and Fuji TV aired from October 12, 1985, to September 21, 1987, on Fuji TV and its affiliates. Remow licensed the series in English and streams it on the "It's Anime" YouTube channel.

A second anime television series adaptation was announced on October 17, 2025. It was produced by Seven with planning and production by Slow Curve and directed by Kazuaki Seki, with Takashi Nishikawa as chief animation director, series composition by Shigeru Murakoshi, Yuka Abe designing the characters, and Night Tempo producing the anime's songs. The series aired from January 9 to March 27, 2026, on the Noitamina programming block on Fuji TV and its affiliates. Amazon Prime Video is streaming the series in North America.

=== Songs ===
The theme songs, with the exceptions of the fifth ending and insert Nakuko mo Warau Kimengumi, were performed by various sub-groups or former members of Onyanko Club:

- Opening themes 1–5, ending themes 1, 3–4, 6, insert songs 1–2 by Ushiroyubi Sasaregumi
- Opening themes 6–7, ending themes 7–8 by Ushirogami Hikaretai
- Ending theme 2 by Onyanko Club and Ushiroyubi Sasaregumi
- Ending theme 5 by Musukko Club

==== Opening themes ====
1. Ushiroyubi Sasare-gumi
2. Zō-san no Scanty
3. Nagisa no "..." (Kagi Kakko)
4. Waza Ari!
5. Kashiko
6. Toki no Kawa wo Koete
7. Anata wo Shiritai

==== Insert songs ====
- Abunai Sa·ka·na
- Watashi ha Chie no Wa (Puzzling)
- Nakuko mo Warau Kimengumi

==== Closing themes ====
1. Jogakusei no Ketsui
2. Banana no Namida
3. Neko Jita Gokoro mo Koi no Uchi
4. Not Only ★ But Also
5. Chotto Karai Aitsu
6. Pythagoras wo Buttobase
7. Ushirogami Hikaretai
8. Tatsutori Ato wo Nigosazu

=== Video releases ===
Kimengumi has been released on DVD in Japan in two different box set releases. The movie was released as part of the second DVD set in 2008.

High School! Kimengumi DVD Box 1
Pioneer LDC, 2001-05-25
High School! Kimengumi DVD Box 2
Pioneer LDC, 2001-07-25
High School! Kimengumi DVD Box 3
Pioneer LDCA, 2001-09-21
High School! Kimengumi Complete DVD Box 1
E-Net Frontier, 2007-12-21
High School! Kimengumi Complete DVD Box 2
E-Net Frontier, 2008-02-22

=== Video games ===
Kimengumi boardgame

There is a traditional boardgame based on the series titled High School! Kimengumi Game, released by Bandai. Three video games have been based on the series:

- High School! Kimengumi for the Master System, an adventure game
- High School! Kimengumi for the MSX2, a port of the Master System game
- High School! Kimengumi: The Table Hockey for PlayStation

There is also a series of pachinko games based on the series manufactured by Maruhon

== Reception ==
In a 2006 survey of celebrities by TV Asahi, High School! Kimengumi was listed as #87 on a list of the top 100 favorite anime series.

The first episode of the 2026 anime adaptation was watched by 2.0 million households.
