= List of programs broadcast by TV Tokyo =

This is a list of anime (including live-action and tokusatsu television series) distributed by TV Tokyo, along with regular and special news and sport programs.

== Anime series (current) ==
Network	Title	Premiere date
TV Setouchi	Shimajirō no Wao!	April 2, 2012
TV Tokyo	PuzDrag	April 2, 2018
TV Tokyo	Ninjala	January 8, 2022
TV Tokyo	Pocket Monsters (2023)	April 14, 2023

== Anime series (all) ==
=== 1970s ===
Title	Premiere date	End date	Production
Dame Oyaji	April 2, 1974	October 9, 1974	Knack Productions
Don Chuck Monogatari	April 5, 1975	September 27, 1975	Knack Productions
Youkaiden Nekome Kozou	April 1, 1976	September 30, 1976	
Don Chuck Monogatari	April 7, 1976	March 25, 1978	
Groizer X	July 1, 1976	March 31, 1977	Knack Animation
Manga Sekai Mukashi Banashi	August 6, 1976	December 24, 1976	
UFO Warrior Dai Apolon II	October 7, 1976	February 24, 1977	Eiken
Gasshin Sentai Mechander Robo	March 3, 1977	December 29, 1977	Wako Productions
Tobidase Machine Hiryū	October 5, 1977	March 29, 1978	Toei Animation; Tatsunoko Production
Dinosaur War Izenborg	October 17, 1977	June 30, 1978	Tsuburaya Productions
Mirai Robo Daltanious	March 21, 1979	March 5, 1980	Nippon Sunrise
Josephina the Whale	April 2, 1979	September 25, 1979	
Paris no Isabel	April 19, 1979	July 12, 1979	Dax International
Toshi Gordian	October 7, 1979	February 27, 1981	Tatsunoko Production
Manga Sarutobi Sasuke	October 9, 1979	April 29, 1980	Knack Animation

=== 1980s ===
Title	Premiere date	End date	Production
Mori no Yōki na Kobitotachi: Belfy & Lillibit	January 7, 1980	July 7, 1980	
Monchhichi Twins	February 4, 1980	August 1, 1980	
Space Emperor God Sigma	March 19, 1980	March 25, 1981	
Sue Cat	April 6, 1980	December 28, 1980	
Zukkoke Knight - Don De La Mancha	April 15, 1980	September 23, 1980	
Densetsu Kyojin Ideon	May 8, 1980	January 30, 1981	Nippon Sunrise
Space Warrior Baldios	June 30, 1980	January 25, 1981	Ashi Productions
Golden Warrior Gold Lightan	March 1, 1981	February 18, 1982	Tatsunoko Production
Beast King GoLion	March 4, 1981	February 24, 1982	Toei Animation
Wakakusa no Yon Shimai	April 7, 1981	September 29, 1981	Kokusai Eiga-sha, Toei Animation
Sengoku Majin GoShogun	July 3, 1981	December 28, 1981	Ashi Productions
Galaxy Cyclone Braiger	October 6, 1981	June 25, 1982	Kokusai Eiga-sha, Toei Animation
Maicching Machiko-sensei	October 8, 1981	October 6, 1983	Studio Pierrot
Anime Oyako Gekijo	October 9, 1981	March 29, 1982	Tatsunoko Production
Fang of the Sun Dougram	October 23, 1981	March 25, 1983	Nippon Sunrise
Armored Fleet Dairugger XV	March 3, 1982	March 23, 1983	Toei Animation
Fairy Princess Minky Momo	March 18, 1982	May 26, 1983	Ashi Productions
Don Dracula	April 5, 1982	April 26, 1982	Tezuka Productions
Time Kyoshitsu: Tondera House no Daiboken	April 5, 1982	March 28, 1983	
Galactic Gale Baxinger	July 6, 1982	March 29, 1983	
Cybot Robotchi	October 7, 1982	June 29, 1983	
Lightspeed Electroid Albegas	March 30, 1983	February 8, 1984	
Armored Trooper Votoms	April 1, 1983	March 23, 1984	
Galactic Whirlwind Sasuraiger	April 5, 1983	January 31, 1984	
Psycho Armor Govarian	July 6, 1983	December 28, 1983	
Manga Aesop Monogatari	October 10, 1983	December 22, 1983	
Captain Tsubasa	October 13, 1983	March 27, 1986	
The Adventures of Little El Cid	February 6, 1984	March 12, 1984	
Giant Gorg	April 5, 1984	September 27, 1984	
Zoku Atakkā You Kin Medaru e no Michi	April 13, 1984	June 21, 1985	
Koala Boy Kocky	October 4, 1984	March 28, 1985	
Musashi no Ken	April 18, 1985	September 26, 1986	
Machine Robo: Revenge of Cronos	July 3, 1986	May 28, 1987	
Oh! Family	October 6, 1986	March 30, 1987	
Oz no Mahoutsukai	October 6, 1986	September 28, 1987	
Ox Tales	April 7, 1987	March 29, 1988	
Machine Robo: Butchigiri Battlehackers	June 3, 1987	December 30, 1987	
Mister Ajikko	October 8, 1987	September 28, 1989	
Oraa Guzura Dado	October 12, 1987	September 20, 1988	
Manga Nihon Keizai Nyuumon	October 13, 1987	March 29, 1988	
Don-Don Domel to Ron	April 5, 1988	March 27, 1989	Telescreen, Telescreen Japan
What's Michael?	April 15, 1988	March 28, 1989	DIC Entertainment
Hello! Lady Lynn	May 12, 1988	January 26, 1989	Toei Animation
Yumemiru Topo Gigio	October 7, 1988	January 6, 1989	Nippon Animation
Alfred Jodocus Kwak	April 3, 1989	March 29, 1990	Visual '80
Tenku Senki Shurato	April 6, 1989	January 18, 1990	Tatsunoko Production
Momotaro Densetsu	October 2, 1989	October 1, 1990	Knack Productions
Dash! Yonkuro	October 3, 1989	March 27, 1990	Staff 21, Aubekku & Tokyu Agency
Jungle Book Shōnen Mowgli	October 9, 1989	October 29, 1990	Nippon Animation
Jungle Emperor	October 12, 1989	October 11, 1990	Tezuka Productions
Wrestler Gundan Seisenshi Robin Jr.	October 19, 1989	September 27, 1990	Tokyo Movie Shinsha

=== 1990s ===
Title	Premiere date	End date	Production
Kyatto Ninden Teyandee	February 1, 1990	February 12, 1991	
Idol Angel Yokoso Yoko	April 2, 1990	February 4, 1991	
NG Knight Ramune & 40	April 6, 1990	January 4, 1991	
Tanoshii Moomin Ikka	April 12, 1990	October 3, 1991	
Magical Angel Sweet Mint	May 2, 1990	March 27, 1991	
Roleplay Densetsu Hepoi	October 6, 1990	September 28, 1991	
The Three-Eyed One	October 18, 1990	September 26, 1991	
Edokko Boy: Gatten Taro	October 19, 1990	March 22, 1991	
Getter Robo Go	February 11, 1991	January 27, 1992	
Kinkyuu Hasshin Saver Kids	February 19, 1991	February 11, 1992	
Zettai Muteki Raijin-Oh	April 3, 1991	March 25, 1992	
Armored Police Metal Jack	April 8, 1991	December 23, 1991	
Jankenman	April 4, 1991	March 26, 1992	
Genji Tsūshin Agedama	October 4, 1991	September 25, 1992	
Tanoshii Moomin Ikka: Bouken Nikki	October 10, 1991	March 26, 1992	
Moero! Top Striker	October 10, 1991	September 24, 1992	
Flaming Rugby Boy: Dodge Danpei	October 14, 1991	September 21, 1992	
Yokoyama Mitsuteru Sangokushi	October 18, 1991	September 25, 1992	
Tekkaman Blade	February 18, 1992	February 2, 1993	
Genki Bakuhatsu Ganbaruger	April 1, 1992	February 24, 1993	
Tomatoman	April 3, 1992	March 27, 1993	
Thumbelina: A Magical Story	September 30, 1992	March 31, 1993	
Adventure! Godzilland	October 1, 1992	December 30, 1993	
Hime-chan's Ribbon	October 2, 1992	December 3, 1993	
The Wonderful Galaxy of Oz	October 5, 1992	April 5, 1993	
Kaze no Naka no Shōjo Kinpatsu no Jeanie	October 15, 1992	September 30, 1993	
The Irresponsible Captain Tylor	January 25, 1993	July 19, 1993	
Nekketsu Saikyo Gozaurer	March 3, 1993	February 23, 1994	
Shippū! Iron Leaguer	April 6, 1993	March 29, 1994	
Yaiba	April 9, 1993	April 1, 1994	
Jungle King Tar-chan	October 14, 1993	September 29, 1994	
Shima Shima Tora no Shimajirou	December 13, 1993	March 31, 2008	
Akazukin ChaCha	January 7, 1994	June 30, 1995	
Asobou! Hello Kitty	April 6, 1994	September 28, 1994	
Tottemo! Luckyman	April 6, 1994	March 23, 1995	
Ginga Sengoku Gun'yūden Rai	April 8, 1994	March 31, 1995	
Haō Taikei Ryū Knight	April 22, 1994	March 28, 1995	
Metal Fighter Miku	July 8, 1994	September 30, 1994	
Blue Seed	October 5, 1994	March 29, 1995	
Doki Doki Densetsu Mahoujin Guru Guru	October 13, 1994	September 14, 1995	
Zenki	January 9, 1995	December 25, 1995	
Tenchi Universe	April 2, 1995	September 24, 1995	
Jura Tripper	April 4, 1995	December 24, 1995	
Juu Senshi Garukiba	April 4, 1995	September 26, 1995	
Ai Tenshi Densetsu Wedding Peach	April 5, 1995	March 27, 1996	
Fushigi Yūgi	April 6, 1995	March 28, 1996	
Slayers	April 7, 1995	September 29, 1995	
Bit the Cupid	April 20, 1995	March 28, 1996	
Nurse Angel Ririka SOS	July 7, 1995	March 8, 1996	
Virtua Fighter	October 2, 1995	June 27, 1996	
Bakuretsu Hunter	October 3, 1995	March 26, 1996	
Mojacko	October 3, 1995	March 31, 1997	
Neon Genesis Evangelion	October 4, 1995	March 27, 1996	
El Hazard: The Magnificent World	October 5, 1995	March 27, 1996	
Bakusou Kyoudai Let's & Go!!	January 8, 1996	December 21, 1998	
Tenkuu no Escaflowne	April 2, 1996	September 24, 1996	
VS Knight Lamune & 40 Fire	April 3, 1996	September 25, 1996	
Mizuiro Jidai	April 4, 1996	February 27, 1997	
Kodomo no Omocha	April 5, 1996	March 27, 1998	
Baby and Me	July 11, 1996	March 26, 1997	
Martian Successor Nadesico	October 1, 1996	March 24, 1997	
Saber Marionette J	October 1, 1996	March 25, 1997	
Violinist of Hamelin	October 2, 1996	March 26, 1997	
Brave Raideen	October 2, 1996	June 25, 1997	
Those Who Hunt Elves	October 3, 1996	December 19, 1996	
Magical Girl Pretty Sammy	October 4, 1996	March 28, 1997	
Eat-Man	January 9, 1997	March 27, 1997	
Mach GoGoGo	January 9, 1997	September 25, 1997	
Kero Kero Chime	March 6, 1997	September 25, 1997	
Shin Tenchi Muyo!	April 1, 1997	September 23, 1997	
Pokémon	April 1, 1997	November 14, 2002	OLM, Inc.
Maze	April 2, 1997	September 24, 1997	
Grander Musashi	April 2, 1997	September 24, 1997	
Revolutionary Girl Utena	April 2, 1997	December 24, 1997	
Hikarian	April 2, 1997	March 29, 2000	
Hyper Police	April 3, 1997	September 25, 1997	
Hareluya II BØY	April 8, 1997	September 30, 1997	
Clamp School Detectives	May 3, 1997	October 25, 1997	
Hare Tokidoki Buta	July 3, 1997	September 29, 1998	
Master of Mosquiton	October 1, 1997	April 1, 1998	
Virus Buster Serge	October 2, 1997	December 19, 1997	
Ehrgeiz	October 2, 1997	December 25, 1997	
Battle Athletes	October 3, 1997	March 27, 1998	
Fortune Quest L	October 18, 1997	May 23, 1998	
Gakkyu-oh Yamazaki	October 27, 1997	November 27, 1998	
Nuku Nuku	January 7, 1998	March 25, 1998	
AWOL - Absent WithOut Leave	January 7, 1998	April 1, 1998	
El Hazard: The Alternative World	January 8, 1998	March 25, 1998	
Record of Lodoss War: Chronicles of the Heroic Knight	April 1, 1998	September 30, 1998	
Trigun	April 1, 1998	September 30, 1998	
Beast Wars II: Super Life-Form Transformers	April 1, 1998	January 27, 1999	
Cowboy Bebop	April 3, 1998	June 26, 1998	Sunrise; Bandai Visual
Lost Universe	April 3, 1998	September 25, 1998	
Grander Musashi RV	April 4, 1998	September 26, 1998	
Takoyaki Mantoman	April 4, 1998	September 25, 1999	
Nazca	April 6, 1998	June 29, 1998	
Silent Möbius	April 7, 1998	September 29, 1998	
Sentimental Journey	April 8, 1998	July 1, 1998	
Weiß Kreuz	April 8, 1998	September 30, 1998	
Hatsumei Boy Kanipan	July 3, 1998	January 29, 1999	
Serial Experiments Lain	July 6, 1998	September 28, 1998	
Nightwalker: The Midnight Detective	July 8, 1998	September 23, 1998	
Jikuu Tantei Genshi-kun	October 1, 1998	June 24, 1999	
Kareshi Kanojo no Jijō	October 2, 1998	March 23, 1999	
Totsugeki! Pappara-tai	October 3, 1998	March 27, 1999	
Popolocrois	October 4, 1998	March 28, 1999	
Saber Marionette J to X	October 6, 1998	March 30, 1999	
Super Doll★Licca-chan	October 6, 1998	September 28, 1999	
Steam Detectives	October 7, 1998	March 31, 1999	
Bubblegum Crisis Tokyo 2040	October 8, 1998	March 31, 1999	
Yoshimoto Muchikko Monogatari	October 26, 1998	November 5, 1999	
Chiisana Kyojin Microman	January 4, 1999	December 27, 1999	
Legend of Himiko	January 7, 1999	March 31, 1999	
Super Life-Form Transformers: Beast Wars Neo	February 3, 1999	September 29, 1999	
Cho Hatsumei Boy Kanipan	February 5, 1999	June 25, 1999	
Gokudō-kun Man'yūki	April 2, 1999	September 24, 1999	
Shin Hakkenden	April 3, 1999	September 25, 1999	
Starship Girl Yamamoto Yohko	April 4, 1999	September 26, 1999	
Jubei-chan - Secret of the Lovely Eyepatch	April 5, 1999	June 28, 1999	
Eden's Bowy	April 6, 1999	September 28, 1999	
Tenshi ni Narumon	April 7, 1999	September 29, 1999	
Kaikan Phrase	April 20, 1999	March 25, 2000	
Cybuster	May 3, 1999	October 25, 1999	
Medabots	July 2, 1999	June 30, 2000	
Hoshin Engi	July 3, 1999	December 25, 1999	
Cyborg Kuro-chan	October 2, 1999	January 6, 2001	
Gozonji! Gekkō Kamen-kun	October 3, 1999	March 26, 2000	
Guru Guru Town Hanamaru-kun	October 3, 1999	September 29, 2001	
Jibaku-kun	October 5, 1999	March 28, 2000	
Seraphim Call	October 6, 1999	December 22, 1999	
Mugen no Ryvius	October 6, 1999	March 23, 2000	
Excel Saga	October 7, 1999	March 30, 2000	
Rerere no Tensai Bakabon	October 19, 1999	March 21, 2000	
Bikkuriman 2000	November 1, 1999	February 26, 2001	
Monkey Magic	December 31, 1999	March 25, 2000	

=== 2000s ===
Title	Premiere date	End date	Production
Boogiepop Phantom	January 5, 2000	March 22, 2000	
Mon Colle Knights	January 10, 2000	December 25, 2000	
Gensoumaden Saiyuki	April 4, 2000	March 27, 2001	
Time Bokan 2000: Kaitou Kiramekiman	April 5, 2000	September 27, 2000	
Transformers: Car Robots	April 5, 2000	December 27, 2000	
Taro the Space Alien	April 17, 2000	March 30, 2001	
Yu-Gi-Oh! Duel Monsters	April 18, 2000	September 29, 2004	
Love Hina	April 19, 2000	September 27, 2000	
Medarot Damashii	July 7, 2000	March 30, 2001	
Tottoko Hamtaro	July 7, 2000	March 31, 2006	
Gear Fighter Dendoh	October 4, 2000	June 27, 2001	
Argento Soma	October 6, 2000	March 22, 2001	
Grappler Baki TV	January 8, 2001	December 24, 2001	
Bakuten Shoot Beyblade	January 8, 2001	December 24, 2001	
Earth Maiden Arjuna	January 9, 2001	March 27, 2001	
Dr. Rin ni Kiitemite!	March 5, 2001	February 27, 2002	
Run=Dim	April 1, 2001	June 24, 2001	
Angelic Layer	April 1, 2001	September 23, 2001	
Cosmic Baton Girl Comet-san	April 1, 2001	January 27, 2002	
Super GALS!	April 1, 2001	March 31, 2002	
Haré+Guu	April 3, 2001	September 25, 2001	
Star Ocean EX	April 3, 2001	September 25, 2001	
Sister Princess	April 4, 2001	October 6, 2001	
Noir	April 6, 2001	September 28, 2001	
Dennō Bōkenki Webdiver	April 6, 2001	March 29, 2002	
Project ARMS	April 7, 2001	March 30, 2002	
Gyōten Ningen Batseelor	April 7, 2001	March 30, 2002	
Chance! Pop Sessions	May 20, 2001	August 26, 2001	
Mamimume Mogacho	July 1, 2001	September 23, 2001	
s-CRY-ed	July 4, 2001	December 26, 2001	
Shaman King	July 4, 2001	September 25, 2002	
Fruits Basket	July 5, 2001	December 27, 2001	
Cosmowarrior Zero	July 6, 2001	September 28, 2001	
Kuru Kuru Amy	October 1, 2001	December 28, 2001	
Final Fantasy: Unlimited	October 2, 2001	March 26, 2002	
Shiawase Sou no Okojo-san	October 2, 2001	September 24, 2002	
Captain Tsubasa: Road to 2002	October 7, 2001	October 6, 2002	
Hikaru no Go	October 10, 2001	March 26, 2003	
Tennis no Ōjisama	October 10, 2001	March 30, 2005	
Kokoro Library	October 12, 2001	December 28, 2001	
Cyborg 009	October 14, 2001	October 13, 2002	
Aquarian Age: Sign for Evolution	January 4, 2002	March 29, 2002	
Bakuten Shoot Beyblade 2002	January 7, 2002	December 30, 2002	
Kinnikuman Nisei	January 9, 2002	December 25, 2002	
Seven of Seven	January 10, 2002	June 27, 2002	
Galaxy Angel Z	February 3, 2002	March 31, 2002	
Rockman EXE	March 4, 2002	March 31, 2003	
Tokyo Underground	April 2, 2002	September 24, 2002	
.hack//SIGN	April 4, 2002	September 25, 2002	
Bakuto Sengen Daigunder	April 5, 2002	September 27, 2002	
Forza! Hidemaru	April 6, 2002	March 29, 2003	
Tokyo Mew Mew	April 6, 2002	March 29, 2003	Studio Pierrot
Full Moon o Sagashite	April 6, 2002	March 29, 2003	
Wagamama Fairy: Mirumo de Pon!	April 6, 2002	September 27, 2005	
Azumanga Daioh	April 8, 2002	September 30, 2002	
Tenshi na Konamaiki	June 4, 2002	March 29, 2003	
Samurai Deeper Kyo	July 1, 2002	December 23, 2002	
Witch Hunter Robin	July 2, 2002	December 24, 2002	
Ground Defense Force! Mao-chan	July 3, 2002	December 25, 2002	
Asagiri no Miko	July 4, 2002	December 26, 2002	
Dragon Drive	July 4, 2002	March 27, 2003	
Fortune Dogs	July 4, 2002	March 29, 2003	
Spiral: The Bonds of Reasoning	October 1, 2002	March 25, 2003	
Asobotto Senki Goku	October 1, 2002	September 30, 2003	
Monkey Typhoon	October 1, 2002	September 30, 2003	
Bomberman Jetters	October 2, 2002	September 24, 2003	
Naruto	October 3, 2002	February 8, 2007	Studio Pierrot
Sister Princess: Re Pure	October 4, 2002	December 25, 2002	
Galaxy Angel A	October 6, 2002	March 30, 2003	
Duel Masters	October 21, 2002	April 4, 2003	
Pocket Monsters Advanced Generation	November 21, 2002	September 14, 2006	OLM, Inc.
Bakuten Shoot Beyblade G-Revolution	January 6, 2003	December 29, 2003	
Nanaka 6/17	January 8, 2003	March 26, 2003	
.hack//Legend of the Twilight Bracelet	January 8, 2003	March 26, 2003	
Shutsugeki! Machine Robo Rescue	January 8, 2003	January 3, 2004	
Transformers: Legend of The Microns	January 10, 2003	December 26, 2003	
E's Otherwise	April 1, 2003	September 23, 2003	
Stellvia	April 2, 2003	September 24, 2003	
D.N. Angel	April 3, 2003	September 25, 2003	
Bouken Yuuki Pluster World	April 3, 2003	March 25, 2004	
Kaleido Star	April 4, 2003	March 27, 2004	
Human Crossing	April 5, 2003	June 28, 2003	
Detective Loki	April 5, 2003	September 27, 2003	
Mermaid Melody: Pichi Pichi Pitch	April 5, 2003	March 27, 2004	
Tank Knights Portriss	April 5, 2003	March 27, 2004	
Sonic X	April 6, 2003	March 28, 2004	TMS Entertainment
Di Gi Charat Nyo!	April 6, 2003	March 29, 2004	
Last Exile	April 7, 2003	September 29, 2003	
Croket!	April 7, 2003	March 29, 2004	
Submarine Super 99	May 8, 2003	July 31, 2003	
Rumiko Takahashi Anthology	July 5, 2003	September 27, 2003	
Papuwa	September 30, 2003	March 30, 2004	
Saiyuki: Reload	October 2, 2003	March 2, 2004	
Cromartie High School	October 2, 2003	March 25, 2004	
Mermaid Forest	October 4, 2003	December 20, 2003	
Rockman EXE Axess	October 4, 2003	September 25, 2004	
Omoikkiri Kagaku Adventure Sou Nanda	October 5, 2003	March 28, 2004	
Gungrave	October 7, 2003	March 30, 2004	
F-Zero: Falcon Legend	October 7, 2003	September 28, 2004	
Galaxy Angel S (special)	December 21, 2003	December 21, 2003	
B-Legend! Battle B-Daman	January 5, 2004	December 27, 2004	
Maria-sama ga Miteru	January 7, 2004	March 31, 2004	
Superior Defender Gundam Force	January 7, 2004	December 29, 2004	
Transformers: Superlink	January 9, 2004	December 24, 2004	
Monkey Turn	January 10, 2004	June 26, 2004	
Aqua Kids	April 1, 2004	September 23, 2004	
Saiyuki: Reload Gunlock	April 1, 2004	September 23, 2004	
Kenran Butohsai: The Mars Daybreak	April 1, 2004	September 23, 2004	
Dan Doh!	April 3, 2004	September 25, 2004	
Sgt. Frog	April 3, 2004	April 3, 2011	
Doki Doki School Hours	April 4, 2004	June 27, 2004	
Sore Ike! Zukkoke Sannin-gumi	April 4, 2004	October 3, 2004	
The Marshmallow Times	April 4, 2004	March 27, 2005	
Madlax	April 5, 2004	September 27, 2004	
Get Ride! Amdriver	April 5, 2004	March 28, 2005	
Ragnarok The Animation	April 6, 2004	September 28, 2004	
Shura no Toki - Age of Chaos	April 6, 2004	September 28, 2004	
Kinnikuman Nisei - Ultimate Muscle	April 7, 2004	June 30, 2004	
Tetsujin 28th	April 7, 2004	September 29, 2004	
Maria-sama ga Miteru ~Haru~	July 4, 2004	September 26, 2004	
Monkey Turn V	July 3, 2004	December 18, 2004	
Fafner in the Azure	July 4, 2004	December 26, 2004	
Galaxy Angel X	July 8, 2004	September 30, 2004	
My-HiME	September 30, 2004	March 31, 2005	
Beet the Vandel Buster	September 30, 2004	September 29, 2005	
Onmyou Taisenki	September 30, 2004	September 29, 2005	
Rockman EXE Stream	October 2, 2004	September 24, 2005	
Viewtiful Joe	October 2, 2004	September 24, 2005	
Zoids: Fuzors	October 3, 2004	April 3, 2005	
MoonPhase	October 4, 2004	March 28, 2005	
Fantastic Children	October 4, 2004	March 28, 2005	
Harukanaru Toki no Naka de Hachiyō Shō	October 5, 2004	March 29, 2005	
School Rumble	October 5, 2004	March 29, 2005	
Tactics	October 5, 2004	March 29, 2005	
Bleach	October 5, 2004	March 27, 2012	
Yu-Gi-Oh! Duel Monsters GX	October 6, 2004	March 26, 2008	
BECK: Mongolian Chop Squad	October 7, 2004	March 31, 2005	
Yakitate!! Japan	October 12, 2004	March 14, 2006	
Starship Operators	January 5, 2005	March 30, 2005	
Negima!	January 6, 2005	June 29, 2005	
Peach Girl	January 8, 2005	June 25, 2005	
Gallery Fake	January 8, 2005	September 24, 2005	
Mahoraba	January 10, 2005	June 26, 2005	
B-Legend! Battle B-Daman: Fire Spirits	January 10, 2005	December 26, 2005	
Fushigiboshi no Futagohime	April 2, 2005	March 25, 2006	
Onegai My Melody	April 3, 2005	March 26, 2006	
Märchen Awakens Romance	April 3, 2005	March 25, 2007	
Genesis of Aquarion	April 4, 2005	September 26, 2005	
The Law of Ueki	April 4, 2005	March 27, 2006	
Elemental Gelade	April 5, 2005	September 27, 2005	
Glass Mask	April 5, 2005	March 28, 2006	
Kouchuu Ouja Mushiking ~Mori no Tami no Densetsu~	April 6, 2005	March 29, 2006	
Eyeshield 21	April 6, 2005	March 19, 2008	
Zoids: Genesis	April 10, 2005	March 26, 2006	
Sugar Sugar Rune	July 2, 2005	June 24, 2006	
Pani Poni Dash!	July 3, 2005	December 25, 2005	
GUNxSWORD	July 4, 2005	December 26, 2005	
Suzuka	July 6, 2005	December 28, 2005	
Fighting Beauty Wulong	October 1, 2005	March 30, 2006	
Rockman EXE Beast	October 1, 2005	April 1, 2006	
Idaten Jump	October 1, 2005	September 30, 2006	
Cluster Edge	October 4, 2005	March 28, 2006	
Animal Yokocho	October 4, 2005	September 26, 2006	
Capeta	October 4, 2005	September 26, 2006	
Aria the Animation	October 5, 2005	December 28, 2005	
Beet the Vandel Buster Excellion	October 6, 2005	March 30, 2006	
My-Otome	October 6, 2005	March 30, 2006	
Kotencotenco	October 6, 2005	September 28, 2006	
Ginban Kaleidoscope	October 8, 2005	December 24, 2005	
Kinnikuman Nisei - Ultimate Muscle 2	January 4, 2006	March 29, 2006	
Kage Kara Mamoru!	January 7, 2006	March 25, 2006	
Wan Wan Celeb Soreyuke! Tetsunoshin	January 7, 2006	December 30, 2006	
Yomigaeru Sora - Rescue Wings	January 8, 2006	March 26, 2006	
Nerima Daikon Brothers	January 9, 2006	March 27, 2006	
Crash B-Daman	January 9, 2006	December 25, 2006	
Kashimashi ~Girl Meets Girl~	January 11, 2006	March 29, 2006	
Aria the Natural	April 2, 2006	September 26, 2006	
Onegai my Melody ~Kuru Kuru Shuffle!~	April 2, 2006	March 23, 2007	
Kiba	April 2, 2006	March 25, 2007	
Simoun	April 3, 2006	September 25, 2006	
BakéGyamon	April 3, 2006	March 26, 2007	
Air Gear	April 4, 2006	September 26, 2006	
Gin Tama	April 4, 2006	October 7, 2018	
.hack//Roots	April 5, 2006	September 27, 2006	
Spider Riders	April 5, 2006	September 27, 2006	
Inukami!	April 6, 2006	September 28, 2006	
Zegapain	April 6, 2006	September 28, 2006	
Kirarin Revolution	April 7, 2006	March 28, 2008	
Rockman EXE Beast+	April 8, 2006	September 30, 2006	
Saru Get You -On Air-	April 8, 2006	October 1, 2006	
Otogi-Jushi Akazukin	July 1, 2006	March 26, 2007	
Demashita! Powerpuff Girls Z	July 1, 2006	June 30, 2007	
Pocket Monsters Diamond & Pearl	September 28, 2006	September 9, 2010	OLM, Inc.
Kiniro no Corda	October 1, 2006	March 25, 2007	
Galaxy Angel Rune	October 2, 2006	December 18, 2006	
Ghost Hunt	October 3, 2006	March 27, 2007	
Tokimeki Memorial ~Only Love~	October 3, 2006	March 27, 2007	
Yamato Nadeshiko Shichi Henge	October 3, 2006	March 27, 2007	
D.Gray-Man	October 3, 2006	September 30, 2008	
Negima!?	October 4, 2006	March 28, 2007	
Super Robot Wars Original Generation: Divine Wars	October 4, 2006	March 29, 2007	
Buso Renkin	October 5, 2006	March 29, 2007	
Kenichi: The Mightiest Disciple	October 7, 2006	September 29, 2007	
Pururun! Shizuku-chan	October 7, 2006	September 29, 2007	
Shooting Star Rockman	October 7, 2006	October 27, 2007	
Katekyo Hitman Reborn!	October 7, 2006	September 25, 2010	
Deltora Quest	January 6, 2007	March 29, 2008	
Master of Epic	January 7, 2007	March 25, 2007	
Gakuen Utopia Manabi Straight!	January 8, 2007	March 26, 2007	
Naruto: Shippuden	February 15, 2007	March 23, 2017	
Tengen Toppa Gurren Lagann	April 1, 2007	September 30, 2007	
Heroic Age	April 1, 2007	September 30, 2007	
Seto no Hanayome	April 1, 2007	September 30, 2007	
Onegai My Melody Sukkiri	April 1, 2007	March 24, 2008	
Robby & Kerobby	April 1, 2007	March 30, 2008	
Hayate the Combat Butler	April 1, 2007	March 31, 2008	
El Cazador de la Bruja	April 2, 2007	September 24, 2007	
Engage Planet Kiss Dum	April 3, 2007	September 25, 2007	
Over Drive	April 3, 2007	September 25, 2007	
Sugarbunnies	April 3, 2007	September 25, 2007	
Kishin Taisen Gigantic Formula	April 4, 2007	September 26, 2007	
Nagasarete Airantou	April 4, 2007	September 26, 2007	
Koutetsu Sangokushi	April 5, 2007	September 27, 2007	
Kamichama Karin	April 6, 2007	September 29, 2007	
Blue Dragon	April 7, 2007	March 29, 2008	
Lucky Star	April 8, 2007	September 16, 2007	
Bamboo Blade	October 1, 2007	March 31, 2008	
Sketchbook ~full color'S~	October 2, 2007	December 25, 2007	
Fantastic Detective Labyrinth	October 2, 2007	March 25, 2008	
Suteki Tantei Labyrinth	October 2, 2007	March 25, 2008	
Dragonaut: The Resonance	October 3, 2007	March 26, 2008	
Sengoku Gakudō Nikki: Sensei no Chonmage	October 6, 2007	October 6, 2007	
Shugo Chara!	October 6, 2007	September 27, 2008	
Minami-ke	October 7, 2007	December 30, 2007	
Jyūshin Enbu - Hero Tales	October 7, 2007	March 30, 2008	
MapleStory	October 7, 2007	March 30, 2008	
Pururun! Shizuku-chan Aha	October 7, 2007	September 28, 2008	
Shooting Star Rockman Tribe	November 3, 2007	March 29, 2008	
Minami-ke: Okawari	January 6, 2008	March 30, 2008	
Aria the Origination	January 8, 2008	March 31, 2008	
Chi's Sweet Home	March 31, 2008	September 26, 2008	
Yu-Gi-Oh! 5D's	April 2, 2008	March 30, 2011	
Uchi no Sanshimai	April 4, 2008	December 28, 2010	
Blue Dragon: Tenkai no Shichi Ryū	April 5, 2008	March 28, 2009	
Penguin no Mondai	April 5, 2008	March 27, 2010	
Neo Angelique Abyss	April 6, 2008	June 29, 2008	
Net Ghost PiPoPa	April 6, 2008	March 29, 2009	
Zettai Karen Children	April 6, 2008	March 29, 2009	
Onegai My Melody Kirara	April 6, 2008	March 29, 2009	
Nabari no Ō	April 6, 2008	September 28, 2008	
Hakken Taiken Daisuki! Shimajirou	April 7, 2008	March 29, 2010	
Vampire Knight	April 7, 2008	June 30, 2008	
Monochrome Factor	April 7, 2008	September 29, 2008	
Soul Eater	April 7, 2008	March 30, 2009	
Golgo 13	April 11, 2008	March 27, 2009	
World Destruction: Sekai Bokumetsu no Rokunin	July 7, 2008	September 30, 2008	
Natsume Yūjin-Chō	July 7, 2008	June 21, 2017	
Hyakko	October 1, 2008	December 24, 2008	
Toradora!	October 2, 2008	March 26, 2009	
Shugo Chara!! Doki	October 4, 2008	September 26, 2009	
Kyo no Gononi	October 5, 2008	December 28, 2008	
Skip Beat!	October 5, 2008	March 29, 2009	
Live On Cardliver Kakeru	October 5, 2008	September 27, 2009	
Inazuma Eleven	October 5, 2008	April 27, 2011	
Bihada Ichizoku	October 7, 2008	December 23, 2008	
Stitch!	October 8, 2008	March 25, 2009	
Minami-ke: Okaeri	January 4, 2009	March 29, 2009	
Sora Kake Girl	January 5, 2009	June 29, 2009	
Chi's New Address	March 30, 2009	September 25, 2009	
Mainichi Kaasan	April 1, 2009	March 25, 2012	
Phantom ~Requiem for the Phantom~	April 2, 2009	September 24, 2009	
Shin Mazinger Shougeki! Z Hen	April 4, 2009	September 26, 2009	
Natsu no Arashi!	April 5, 2009	June 29, 2009	
Cross Game	April 5, 2009	March 28, 2010	
Jewelpet	April 5, 2009	March 28, 2010	
Metal Fight Beyblade	April 5, 2009	March 30, 2010	
Saki	April 6, 2009	September 28, 2009	
Tamagotchi	October 12, 2009	September 3, 2012	
Fairy Tail	October 12, 2009	September 29, 2019	

=== 2010s ===
Title	Premiere date	End date	Production
Baka to Test to Shoukanjuu	January 7, 2010	March 31, 2010	Silver Link
Heroman	April 1, 2010	September 23, 2010	Bones, POW! Entertainment, Wowmax Media
Metal Fight Beyblade Explosion	April 4, 2010	March 27, 2011	
Lilpri	April 4, 2010	March 27, 2011	
Shimajirou Hesoka	April 5, 2010	March 26, 2012	
Pocket Monsters: Best Wishes!	September 23, 2010	September 26, 2013	OLM, Inc.
Squid Girl	October 4, 2010	December 20, 2010	
Fortune Arterial	October 8, 2010	December 24, 2010	
Gosick	January 7, 2011	July 2, 2011	
Cardfight!! Vanguard	January 8, 2011	March 31, 2012	
Metal Fight Beyblade 4D	March 3, 2011	April 1, 2012	
Lilpri Nori-Star	April 6, 2011	March 28, 2012	
Pretty Rhythm: Aurora Dream	April 9, 2011	March 31, 2012	
Yu-Gi-Oh! Zexal	April 11, 2011	March 23, 2014	
Inazuma Eleven GO	May 4, 2011	April 11, 2012	
Baka to Test To Shoukanjuu: Ni	July 8, 2011	September 30, 2011	
Shinryaku!? Ika Musume	September 26, 2011	December 26, 2011	
B-Daman Crossfire	October 2, 2011	September 30, 2012	
Kimi to Boku	October 4, 2011	December 27, 2011	
The Prince of Tennis II	January 5, 2012	March 29, 2012	
Daily Lives of High School Boys	January 9, 2012	March 26, 2012	
Shimajirou no Wao!	April 2, 2012	Present	
Pretty Rhythm: My Dear Future	April 7, 2012	March 30, 2013	
Metal Fight Beyblade Zero G	April 8, 2012	December 23, 2012	
Cardfight!! Vanguard: Asia Circuit	April 8, 2012	January 2, 2013	
Samurai	April 8, 2012	July 21, 2021	
Nyaruko: Crawling with Love	April 10, 2012	July 1, 2013	
Tamagotchi! Yume Kira Dream	September 10, 2012	August 29, 2013	
Kamisama Hajimemashita	October 1, 2012	December 24, 2012	
My Little Monster	October 2, 2012	December 25, 2012	
Monsuno	October 3, 2012	September 25, 2013	
Aikatsu!	October 8, 2012	September 26, 2013	
Love Live!	January 6, 2013	June 29, 2014	
Cardfight!! Vanguard: Link Joker	January 13, 2013	March 2, 2014	
Pretty Rhythm: Rainbow Live	April 6, 2013	March 29, 2014	
Arata: The Legend	April 8, 2013	July 1, 2013	
No Matter How I Look at It, It's You Guys' Fault I'm Not Popular!	July 8, 2013	September 23, 2013	
Yamishibai: Japanese Ghost Stories	July 15, 2013	Present	
Tamagotchi! Miracle Friends	September 5, 2013	March 27, 2014	
Aikatsu Stars!	October 3, 2013	September 25, 2014	
Gundam Build Fighters	October 7, 2013	March 31, 2014	
Yowamushi Pedal	October 7, 2013	July 1, 2014	
Non Non Biyori	October 8, 2013	March 29, 2021	
Pocket Monsters: XY	October 17, 2013	October 22, 2015	OLM, Inc.
Future Card Buddyfight	January 4, 2014	April 4, 2015	
Nobunaga the Fool	January 5, 2014	June 22, 2014	
The Love of New Wings	January 7, 2014	October 18, 2016	
Yo-Kai Watch	January 8, 2014	March 30, 2018	
Cardfight!! Vanguard: Legion Mate	March 9, 2014	October 19, 2014	
Majin Bone	April 1, 2014	March 31, 2015	
Go-Go Tamagotchi!	April 3, 2014	March 26, 2015	
Yu-Gi-Oh! Arc-V	April 6, 2014	March 26, 2017	
Gekkan Shōjo Nozaki-kun	July 7, 2014	September 22, 2014	
Hanayamata	July 7, 2014	September 22, 2014	
Aikatsu Friends!	October 2, 2014	September 24, 2015	
Garo Honoo no Kokuin	October 3, 2014	March 27, 2015	
Gugure! Kokkuri-san	October 5, 2014	December 21, 2014	
When Supernatural Battles Became Commonplace	October 6, 2014	December 22, 2014	
Yowamushi Pedal: Grande Road	October 6, 2014	March 30, 2015	
Trinity Seven	October 8, 2014	December 24, 2014	
Gundam Build Fighters Try	October 8, 2014	April 1, 2015	
Girlfriend Kari	October 13, 2014	December 29, 2014	
Cardfight!! Vanguard G	October 26, 2014	October 2, 2015	
Binan Koukou Chikyuu Bouei-bu Love	January 6, 2015	March 24, 2015	
Sengoku Musou	January 11, 2015	March 29, 2015	
World Break: Aria of Curse for a Holy Swordsman	January 11, 2015	March 29, 2015	
Future Card Buddyfight Hundred	April 11, 2015	March 26, 2016	
Jitsu wa Watashi wa	July 6, 2015	September 28, 2015	
Himitsu No Cocotama	October 1, 2015	June 28 2018	
Osomatsu-san	October 5, 2015	March 26, 2018	
One Punch Man	October 5, 2015	July 2, 2019	
Garo Guren no Tsuki	October 9, 2015	April 1, 2016	
Pocket Monsters: XY & Z	October 29, 2015	October 27, 2016	OLM, Inc.
Seisen Cerberus: Ryuukoku no Fatalite	April 4, 2016	June 27, 2016	
Beyblade Burst	April 4, 2016	March 27, 2017	
Re:Zero	April 4, 2016	September 19, 2016 (S1 Original Run)	White Fox
Hundred	April 5, 2016	June 20, 2016	Production IMS
Sousei no Onmyouji	April 6, 2016	March 29, 2017	
Puzzle & Dragons X	July 4, 2016	March 26, 2018	
The Disastrous Life of Saiki K.	July 4, 2016	December 28, 2018	
Digimon Universe: Appli Monsters	October 1, 2016	September 30, 2017	
Pocket Monsters: Sun & Moon	November 17, 2016	November 3, 2019	OLM, Inc.
Kemono Friends	January 10, 2017	March 28, 2017	
Duel Masters King	April 2, 2017	August 28, 2022	
Beyblade Burst God	April 3, 2017	March 26, 2018	
Boruto: Naruto Next Generations	April 5, 2017	March 26, 2023	
Love Tyrant	April 6, 2017	June 22, 2017	
Yu-Gi-Oh! VRAINS	May 10, 2017	September 25, 2019	
Black Clover	October 3, 2017	March 30, 2021	
Beyblade Burst Super Z	April 2, 2018	March 25, 2019	
Gundam Build Divers	April 3, 2018	September 25, 2018	
KiraKira Happy Hirake! Cocotama	September 6, 2018	September 26, 2019	
Captain Tsubasa (2018)	October 15, 2018	April 1, 2019	
Bakugan: Battle Planet	April 1, 2019	March 30, 2020	
Ace of Diamond Act II	April 2, 2019	March 31, 2020	
Yo-kai Watch!	April 5, 2019	December 20, 2019	
Fruits Basket (2019)	April 6, 2019	June 29, 2021	
Ahiru no Sora	October 2, 2019	September 30, 2020	
Zoids Wild Zero	October 4, 2019	October 16, 2020	
Aikatsu on Parade!	October 5, 2019	March 28, 2020	
The Seven Deadly Sins: Wrath of the Gods	October 9, 2019	March 25, 2020	
Pocket Monsters (2019)	November 17, 2019	March 24, 2023	OLM, Inc.

=== 2020s ===
Title	Premiere date	End date	Production
Yu-Gi-Oh! Sevens	April 4, 2020	March 27, 2022	Bridge
Mewkledreamy	April 5, 2020	March 27, 2022	J.C.Staff
King's Raid: Successors of the Will	October 3, 2020	March 27, 2021	OLM, Sunrise Beyond
Dragon Quest: The Adventure of Dai (2020)	October 3, 2020	October 22, 2022	Toei Animation
Shaman King (2021)	April 1, 2021	April 21, 2022	Bridge
Odd Taxi	April 6, 2021	June 29, 2021	OLM, P.I.C.S
Yo-kai Watch ♪	April 9, 2021	March 31, 2023	OLM, Magic Bus
Waccha PriMagi! (2021)	October 3, 2021	October 9, 2022	Tatsunoko Production, Dong Woo Animation
AMAIM: Warrior at the Borderline	October 5, 2021	June 28, 2022	Sunrise Beyond
The Fruit of Evolution	October 5, 2021	April 1, 2023	Hotline
Takt Op. Destiny	October 6, 2021	December 22, 2021	MAPPA, Madhouse
Komi Can't Communicate	October 7, 2021	June 23, 2022	OLM
Orient (manga)	January 6, 2022	September 27, 2022	A.C.G.T
Life with an Ordinary Guy Who Reincarnated into a Total Fantasy Knockout	January 12, 2022	March 30, 2022	OLM
Shadowverse Flame	April 2, 2022	March 25, 2023	Zexcs
Cap Kakumei Bottleman DX	April 3, 2022	March 26, 2023	
Yu-Gi-Oh! Go Rush!!	April 3, 2022	March 30, 2025	
Birdie Wing: Golf Girls' Story	April 6, 2022	June 24, 2023	BN Pictures
Spy × Family	April 9, 2022	December 23, 2023	Wit Studio, CloverWorks
Onipan!	April 11, 2022	July 1, 2022	Wit Studio
Phantom of the Idol	July 2, 2022	September 3, 2022	Studio Gokumi
Tokyo Mew Mew New	July 6, 2022	June 21, 2023	Yumeta Company, Graphinica
The Prince of Tennis II: U-17 World Cup	July 7, 2022	Present	M.S.C, Studio Kai
Duel Masters Win	September 4, 2022	March 31, 2024	Brain's Base, SMDE
PuniRunes	October 2, 2022	March 26, 2023	
Do It Yourself!!	October 6, 2022	December 22, 2022	Pine Jam
Bleach: Thousand-Year Blood War	October 11, 2022	Present	Pierrot (1, 2), Pierrot Films (3)
Cool Doji Danshi	October 11, 2022	March 28, 2023	Pierrot
Chainsaw Man	October 12, 2022	December 28, 2022	MAPPA
Me & Roboco	December 5, 2022	June 19, 2023	Gallop
Technoroid: Overmind	January 5, 2023	March 30, 2023	Doga Kobo
Trigun Stampede	January 7, 2023	Present	Orange
Ippon Again!	January 9, 2023	April 3, 2023	Bakken Record
Reborn to Master the Blade: From Hero-King to Extraordinary Squire	January 10, 2023	March 28, 2023	Studio Comet
Hell's Paradise: Jigokuraku	April 1, 2023	Present	MAPPA
Kizuna no Allele	April 4, 2023	December 21, 2023	Wit Studio, Signal.MD
Insomniacs After School	April 11, 2023	July 4, 2023	LIDENFILMS
Sweet Reincarnation	July 4, 2023	September 19, 2023	SynergySP
The Dreaming Boy Is a Realist	July 4, 2023	September 19, 2023	Studio Gokumi, AXsiZ
Synduality: Noir	July 11, 2023	March 26, 2024	Eight Bit
B-Project Passion*Love Call (Season 3)	October 2, 2023	December 18, 2023	Asahi Production
Shy	October 3, 2023	Present	Eight Bit
The Demon Sword Master of Excalibur Academy	October 3, 2023	December 19, 2023	Passione
Tokyo Revengers: Tenjiku-hen (Season 3)	October 4, 2023	December 27, 2023	LIDENFILMS
Mr. Villain's Day Off	January 8, 2024	March 25, 2024	Shin-Ei Animation, SynergySP
Hokkaido Gals Are Super Adorable!	January 9, 2024	March 26, 2024	Silver Link, Blade
The Foolish Angel Dances with the Devil	January 9, 2024	March 26, 2024	Children's Playground Entertainment
Shaman King: Flowers	January 10, 2024	April 3, 2024	Bridge
Cherry Magic! Thirty Years of Virginity Can Make You a Wizard?!	January 11, 2024	March 28, 2024	Satelight
Bucchigiri?!	January 13, 2024	April 6, 2024	MAPPA

== Live-action and tokusatsu series ==
- Spider-Man
- Daimajin Kanon
- Chouseishin Series
- The Gransazers
- El Chavo
- The Justirisers
- Sazer X
- Cutie Honey: The Live
- The Fuccons
- K-tai Investigator 7
- Tomica Hero Series
- Tomica Hero: Rescue Force
- Tomica Hero: Rescue Fire
- Ultra Series
- Ultraman Retsuden/Shin Ultraman Retsuden
  - Ultraman Ginga
  - Ultraman Ginga S
  - Ultraman X
  - Ultraman Orb
  - Ultraman Zero: The Chronicle
  - Ultraman Geed
  - Ultraman Orb: The Chronicle
  - Ultraman R/B
  - Ultraman New Generation Chronicle
  - Ultraman Taiga
  - Ultraman Chronicle Zero & Geed
  - Ultraman Z
- Girls × Heroine Series
  - Idol × Warrior Miracle Tunes!
  - Magical × Heroine Magimajo Pures!
  - Secret × Heroine Phantomirage!
  - Police × Heroine Lovepatrina!

=== Drama 24 ===
  - Yukemuri Sniper
  - Uramiya Honpo
  - URAKARA
  - Majisuka Gakuen
  - Y. Brave and Devil's Castle (勇者ヨシヒコと魔王の城)

=== Theater Gold ===
  - 24 TWENTY FOUR Season 5
  - The Road to El Dorado
  - Sinbad: Legend of the Seven Seas
  - Treasure Planet
  - Atlantis: The Lost Empire

=== Special programs ===
- Sunday Big Valiety
- Monday Premiere!
- New year wide Historical play (新春ワイド時代劇, every January)
- TV Champion
- Wang playoff gluttony (元祖!大食い王決定戦)
- Sumidagawa Fireworks Festival (every July)
- Billboard Japan Music Awards

== Television programs ==
=== News programs ===
- TXN News
- News Morning Satellite
- E Morning
- NEWS Answer
- World Business Satellite
- Yasuhiro Tase's Weekly News Bookstore (田勢康弘の週刊ニュース新書)

=== Economic programs ===
- Nikkei special The Dawn of Gaia (日経スペシャル ガイアの夜明け)
- Nikkei special The Cambria Palace (日経スペシャル カンブリア宮殿)

=== Documentary programs ===
- Beauty giants (美の巨人たち)
- Solomon flow (ソロモン流)

=== Information programs ===
Daily

- 7 Studio Bratch!
- Ladies 4

Saturday

- Ad-machick Tengoku (出没!アド街ック天国)

=== Variety programs ===
- Kaiun Nandemo Kanteidan (開運!なんでも鑑定団)
- Ariehen World (ありえへん∞世界)
- Yarisugi Kozy (やりすぎコージー)
- Japanese General Honke (和風総本家、TV Osaka)
- Chokotto iikoto - Takashi Okamura & Hong Kong Happy project (ちょこっとイイコト～岡村ほんこんしあわせプロジェクト)
- George Tokoro's School is a place where I not tell (所さんの学校では教えてくれないそこんトコロ!)
- Takeshi's Nippon no Mikata (たけしのニッポンのミカタ!)
- Moya-Moya Summers 2 (モヤモヤさまぁ～ず2)
- Muscat Night (マスカットナイト)
- Weekly AKB (週刊AKB)
- AKB Kousagi Dojo (AKB子兎道場)
- Valiety 7
  - OL saw dispatch! (ハケンOLは見た!)
  - Gokujou dikara (極嬢ヂカラ)
  - God-Tan (ゴッドタン)
  - Kira-Kira Afro (きらきらアフロ, TV Osaka)
  - Kudamaki Hachibei X （くだまき八兵衛X）
- Itao Roman
- Ari-Ken (アリケン)
- Shinsuke Minami DEKO-BOKO Daigakkou (三波伸介の凸凹大学校)
- ASAYAN
- You wa Nani shi ni Nippon He (YOUは何しに日本へ?)
- Little Tokyo Live (リトルトーキョーライフ Ritorutōkyōraifu) every Wednesday, around midnight

=== Travel & gourmet programs ===
- Ii-tabi Yume-Kibun (いい旅・夢気分)
- Drive a GO! GO!
- Saturday Special
- Stay at the countryside? (田舎に泊まろう!)

=== Music programs ===
- Japan Countdown
- Enka no Hanamichi (演歌の花道)
- Yan-yan Music studio (ヤンヤン歌うスタジオ)

=== Sports programs ===
- LPGA Of Japan
- Neo Sports
- Winning Horse racing (ウイニング競馬)
- J1 League
- UEFA Champions League (1992–Present)
- UEFA Europa League (2000–Present) (Formerly known as UEFA Cup)
- UEFA Conference League (2021–Present)
- UEFA Super Cup (2005–Present)
