= Hisashi Katsuta =

Japanese voice actor and author (1927–2020)

- 勝田 久
- Born: 2 April 1927; Tokyo, Empire of Japan
- Died: 21 February 2020 (aged 92); Ōme, Tokyo, Japan
- Education: Technical Institute for Wireless-Communications
- Occupations: Actor; voice actor
- Years active: 1948–2020
- Spouse: Katsumi (勝美)

Hisashi Katsuta (勝田 久, Katsuta Hisashi; 2 April 1927 – 21 February 2020) was a Japanese actor and voice actor. He is best known for his voice-over portrayal of Professor Ochanomizu in three anime adaptations of the Astro Boy franchise, and also voiced Dr. Hoshi in Astroganger (1972–1973), Professor Tobishima in Groizer X (1976–1977), and Shin'ichirō Izumi in Tōshō Daimos (1978–1979).

== Early life ==
Hisashi Katsuta was born on 2 April 1927 in Tokyo, and was educated at Seigakuin Junior & Senior High School and the Technical Institute for Wireless-Communications (now the University of Electro-Communications).

He had been interested in film and theater since childhood, and he and his elder brother would often see films. He graduated from the Kamakura Academia Faculty of Theatre in 1949. He became a member of the Toho Drama Club in 1948, and was also a member of the Tōkyō Hōsō Gekidan, Mori no Kai, Players Center, Tēbura, Rindō Pro, Tokyo Actor's Consumer's Cooperative Society, and Arts Vision.

== Voice acting career ==
His voice acting career started in 1948 when he appeared in NHK's 1948 radio adaptation of the Shi Nai'an novel Water Margin, and he was contracted to the broadcaster in 1949 before being released in 1954. Katsuta would later become a pioneer in voice acting in Japan. He started dubbing work with the Japanese dub of The Buccaneers, a television drama produced in the United Kingdom in 1956. He later cited Surfside 6 and The Beverly Hillbillies, both American live-action shows in the 1960s, as two of his most memorable dubbing works.

In 1963, he was cast as Dr. Ochanomizu in the anime Astro Boy. The Ochanomizu character would become Katsuta's own magnum opus, and he would later reprise his role in both the 1980 and 2003 anime adaptations of Astro Boy, as well as the film adaptations Hero of Space and Shinsengumi.

In addition to Dr. Ochanomizu, he also voiced Dr. Hoshi in Astroganger, Professor Tobishima in Groizer X, and Shin'ichirō Izumi in Tōshō Daimos. In 1979, Katsuta voiced King Louis XV in The Rose of Versailles and a fictional depiction of the Sengoku-era samurai Sanada Yukimura in Manga Sarutobi Sasuke. He had minor roles in several anime series, including Cat's Eye, Dororo, Jetter Mars, Katri, Girl of the Meadows, Kimba the White Lion, Legend of the Galactic Heroes, Marine Boy, Megazone 23, Musashi no Ken, Oishinbo, Perman, Shin Jungle Taitei: Susume Leo!, The Monster Kid, and Voltes V.

== Later life and death ==
Katsuta was taught by "veteran voice actors" and felt that he wanted to teach voice actors, and after being a lecturer in several voice acting schools, he started a voice acting class in April 1982, which in April 1987 would later become the Katsuta Voice Acting Academy (勝田声優学院, Katsuta Seiyū Gakuin), where he would be dean.

Katsuta later published a book on voice acting, Shōwa seiyū retsuden terebi sōsō-ki o koe de sasaeta meiyū-tachi (昭和声優列伝 テレビ草創期を声でささえた名優たち), and later credited the fact that voice acting in Japan has a history as his reason for authoring the book. He also published Soshite seiyū ga hajimatta (そして声優が始まった), an autobiography that feature thirty-two voice actors with a prominent impact on Japanese culture. He was one of three winners of the Synergy Award at the 3rd Seiyu Awards on 7 March 2009.

Katsuta died of senility on 21 February 2020, at the age of 92 in a hospital in Ōme, Tokyo; he was survived by his wife Katsumi (勝美).

== Filmography ==
=== Animation ===
1963

- Astro Boy, Professor Ochanomizu

1965

- Kimba the White Lion, Mandi

1967

- Perman, Mantarō Suwa

1968

- One Pack Tanteidan, at least sixteen minor characters
- Sasuke, narrator

1969

- Dororo, Shinsuke
- Marine Boy, boss, subordinate
- Ninpū Kamui Gaiden, Shoya

1970

- Bakuhatsu Gorō, Aozora Gakuen Principal

1971

- Animetally Ketsudan, Sōsaku Suzuki

1972

- Astroganger, Dr. Hoshi
- Mon Cherie Coco, Papa

1975

- Don Chuck Monogatari

1976

- 3000 Leagues in Search of Mother, Fosco
- Groizer X, Professor Tobishima

1977

- Jetter Mars, Dr. Kawashimo
- Lupin the Third Part II, Los Angeles Police Station Chief
- Voltes V, General Dange
- Yakyū-kyō no Uta, Owner

1978

- One Million-Year Trip: Bandar Book, Edo
- Tōshō Daimos, Shin'ichirō Izumi

1979

- Manga Sarutobi Sasuke, Sanada Yukimura
- The Rose of Versailles, Louis XV
- Undersea Super Train: Marine Express, Dr. Narzonkopf

1980

- Astro Boy, Professor Ochanomizu

1983

- Cat's Eye, Director Takeoka

1984

- Katri, Girl of the Meadows, Elias Lilack
- Lupin III Part III, Count Goan

1985

- Musashi no Ken, Ueda-sensei

1988

- Oishinbo, Chairman Futaki

1990

- RPG Densetsu Hepoi, Takuwan Taoist

2003

- Astro Boy, Professor Ochanomizu

=== Film ===
1982

- The Monster Kid: Demon Sword, President of Akumajuku

=== Dubbing ===
- ER, Dr. Jim McNulty (Ed Asner)
- Friends, Roy (Danny DeVito)
- The Great Escape (1971 Fuji TV edition), Flight Lieutenant Colin Blythe (Donald Pleasence)
