= Hiroshi Masuoka (voice actor) =

Japanese voice actor (1936–2020)

- 増岡 弘
- Born: August 7, 1936; Minami, Saitama Prefecture, Japan
- Died: March 21, 2020 (aged 83)
- Occupations: Actor; voice actor; narrator
- Years active: 1958–2019
- Agent: Haikyō
- Notable credit(s): Sazae-san as Masuo Fuguta; Let's Go! Anpanman as Uncle Jam; Dragon Ball Z as Master Roshi

Hiroshi Masuoka (増岡 弘, Masuoka Hiroshi; August 7, 1936 – March 21, 2020) was a Japanese actor, voice actor and narrator from Minami, Saitama Prefecture, Japan. He famously voiced the roles of Masuo Fuguta in Sazae-san and Uncle Jam in Let's Go! Anpanman. He also voiced Master Roshi in the last episodes of Dragon Ball Z and all of Dragon Ball GT, following the death of Kōhei Miyauchi. He was last affiliated with the Tokyo Actor's Consumer's Cooperative Society.

== Biography ==
=== Early life ===
Masuoka was born on August 7, 1936, in Minami-Saitama, Saitama Prefecture (now known as Iwatsuki Ward, Saitama City). His family ran a farm, with his father taking great pride in his work as a farmer. In his later years, Masuoka revealed that much of he and his family's food was self-sufficient.

In middle school, his homeroom teacher was a painter, to the point of having his works displayed at the Japan Fine Arts Exhibition. He became so inspired by his teacher that he decided to become a painter himself.

After graduating from junior high school, thinking he couldn't make a living just by drawing, he decided to enroll in Saitama Prefectural Omiya Technical High School, but dropped out due to various circumstances. He then enrolled in the Faculty of Fine Arts at Tokyo University of the Arts in order to study painting, but dropped out again after only two years because he wanted to paint freely. Eventually, he graduated from the Department of Culture and Arts at Bunka Gakuin.

During his time in college, while working a part-time job as a sandwich man for a Chinese restaurant located in Asagaya, Tokyo, he entered the world of theater per the invitation of a coworker of his. At the time, he had no interest in acting, thinking, "What is left behind after rejoicing in a fleeting, festival-like commotion? Besides, since theater is a group activity, it's not something where you can freely express your own individuality. Why would anyone do something like this?" But because he liked art, he ended up taking part in stage design.

=== Career ===
While in charge of the set design for a production, one of the cast members ran off with the funds, so Masuoka was asked to take his place, much to his embarrassment. He switched his career dream to acting after feeling deeply ashamed and regretful for having forgotten his lines, driven by a desire to "do it all over again."

In 1957, he established the Hyogenza theater troupe together with Makio Inoue and his other peers. He said that he was greatly influenced by the playwright Shūji Terayama, whom he had met, and that it was at Terayama's invitation that he started his acting career in earnest.

In 1959, relying on a friend, Masuoka moved to Nagoya, applied for the Chubu-Nippon Broadcasting Drama Troupe audition, and he ended up passing, becoming a member of the troupe.

In 1961, while he was frequenting the Tokyo branch of Chubu-Nippon Broadcasting, a local kissaten master introduced him to a manager, leading to Masuoka joining the Tokyo Actor's Consumer's Cooperative Society.

In 1967, he played the hunchback and took the lead role in "The Hunchback of Aomori" the inaugural performance of the theater company Tenjō Sajiki led by Terayama, though due to various circumstances, he was not a member of the company, making it an external appearance.

As a voice actor, he had been active ever since the early days of television. Regarding on when exactly did he start his career as a voice actor, he said in a later interview, "People often ask me that, but when they do, it makes me scratch my head. I honestly have little to no idea when it was." His debut as a voice actor was portraying the role of Kuma in Wolf Boy Ken.

In addition to his work as a voice actor, he led the theater company 'Tokyo Renaissance' to train young actors starting in 1986 and served as an instructor in the voice acting department at the Tokyo Animator College, giving lectures all across Japan.

=== Final years and retirement ===
In 2018, Masuoka received the Merit Award at the 12th Seiyu Awards.

In August 2019, he retired from the roles of Masuo Fuguta in Sazae-san and Uncle Jam in Let's Go! Anpanman. He proposed to step down from both roles in both programs himself due to his old age. He would later remark that while leaving was "very painful," the catalyst came when he realized his physical strength was declining due to his age, prompting him to wonder, "Will I still be able to convey various things like courage and energy to the viewers in the future?" Thinking of the future, he decided it was time to pass the baton to a fitting successor, leading to graduation. The staff of both series agreed to the decision after discussions, with Hideyuki Tanaka taking over the role of Masuo Fuguta starting August 25 that year and Kōichi Yamadera taking over the role of Uncle Jam.

Around a month before and after the announcements above, Masuoka temporarily stepped down from narrating Ariyoshi-kun no Shojiki Sanpo due to declining health, but returned in September.

=== Death ===
Masuoka died from rectal cancer on March 21, 2020, at 83 years old. After his funeral and farewell service were held privately with only close relatives, the announcement of his death was made to the public media on March 26 that year.

Following his death, a mourning message and tribute telop was shown in the March 29 broadcast of Sazae-san of that year. Hideyuki Tanaka, Masuoka's successor on Sazae-san as the voice of Masuo, shared a memorial statement, "I have worked together with Masuoka-san on many programs since long ago. His gentle smile, his fun conversations, and his calm personality. I will remember all of it forever. Please rest in peace." Additionally, on the April 4 broadcast of Ariyoshi-kun no Shojiki Sanpo the same year, an on-screen memorial message at the beginning and a memorial video clip after the end of the broadcast for Masuoka were shown.

== Personality ==
=== Features and characteristics ===
His voice range was baritone, bass-baritone.

It was often said that his voice quality never changed. Regarding it, he said, "I'm sure that a voice is something that comes from the heart, so as long as your heart doesn't change, you can keep sounding the same forever... I like to think that voices don't grow old."

His special skill was rakugo. He was a disciple of Yanagiya Sansuke the 2nd, and his stage name was "Masamasaya Chansuke" (益々家ちゃん助).

His personal hobby was making miso (described below). In addition, he continued a self-sufficient lifestyle by making pottery, pickles, and growing vegetables.

He had many siblings, with him being the second son with an older brother and younger sister.

=== Making miso ===
One of Masuoka's hobbies was making miso.

In addition to serving as the representative of the incorporated association Miso Hitomonchaku from its establishment in 1979 until going defunct in 2017, he also authored books related to miso.

He naturally knew how to make it very well because he used to help his farmer father as a child. He started to doing it himself in the 1970s when he thought about improving his diet after his child suffered from childhood asthma.

Many people, including fellow voice actors, would gather at Miso Hitomonchaku where they would jointly purchase soybeans and koji and hold a miso tasting event every winter.

Masuoka's preference with miso was to use barley koji as opposed to rice koji. On the other hand, there were also times when he would use a mixture of rice koji and barley koji.

Because the quality of miso can vary depending on weather and storage conditions, he allowed for a broad range of possible outcomes and accepted unsuccessful results as part of the process. He approached miso-making in a manner similar to his work as a voice actor.

=== Episodes ===
==== Attitude towards work ====
When building a character, it is said that he first thought of an unsuitable (or over-the-top) performance, and then narrowed down his acting approach from there. This is because, based on a past failure when he played a black character early in his career and tried to crush their voice while acting based on the stereotype of a "black person," a director told them, "I want you to play the role based on the character's situation," leading him to re-realize that a voice actor's job is not about "creating a voice" but rather "creating a person."

He was active in fostering the next generation and served as an instructor at multiple vocational schools and training institutes. According to his former student Yūichi Matsumoto, Masuoka's strict guidance was well-known among students. Masuoka acknowledged this, saying, "There are times when I wonder if I might be going too far," then adding, "I've decided to speak the truth, even if it means people might dislike me. After all, a mentor is only a mentor if they provide guidance." "If you just give safe, inoffensive advice, you'll never become a voice actor—not even in 100 years. I hope that before they graduate, my students will find at least one opportunity to discover something that fits them perfectly—'a charm unique to them, or a role that only they can play.'"

==== Sazae-san ====
In the anime Sazae-san, succeeding Shinsuke Chikaishi, Masuoka served as the second voice actor for Masuo Fuguta for about 41 years, from the broadcast on June 11, 1978, to the broadcast on August 18, 2019.

Although Chikaishi was his senior, they became friends through shared hobbies like making miso. Also, when Masuoka was starting out, Chikaishi told him, "Masuoka-san, you can easily understand what an actor is if you compare it to a single company. What to make, whether what you made is needed in today's world, whether everyone knows about it through promotion, checking what sells—the presidents and employees who do all of these things are all inside you. Try thinking of yourself as a single company. If you do that, naturally everyone will cooperate happily with each other to make good things, and there is no way it won't sell." He would say that those words had a major impact on his acting career.

Based on his experience of playing Masuo, he came to intentionally stop being conscious of his predecessor's performance when taking over roles for other works like Dragon Ball Z.

When performing, he is known for his unique deliveries of casual lines and exclamations like "Eh~?!".

He claimed "I'm home~" and "See you later~" as his favorite lines of Masuo, because "there was a plain yet warm sound to them."

Regarding recording for Sazae-san, it felt just like everyday life, so he didn't feel at all like he was doing work, but noted that "that is also the good part about it". At the same time however, he would sometimes voice complaints with treatment he received.

Regarding the show itself, it is described as a work that casually teaches important things such as manners and etiquette.

Masuoka noted given that in the current world, with nuclear families are becoming more common, "I think deep down, a family where three generations live together, just like Sazae-san's family, might be the ideal. That must be why it seeps smoothly into the hearts of the viewers, like the taste of tea served at just the right temperature.", he said. He mentioned living environments that are rarely seen these days, such as small children riding tricycles by themselves and two full-time housewives diligently raising children, and said, "A household with a high self-sufficiency rate in every sense. I think that is what everyone is looking for." Regarding the character of Katsuo, he said, "His priorities are different from modern children, and what makes him admirable is that they prioritize play over studying", following with, "We live in a society that demands perfection, but I think it is totally fine to get lost in play like Katsuo."

==== Let's Go! Anpanman ====
In the anime Let's Go! Anpanman, he voiced the character of Uncle Jam for many years, from the start of the show's broadcast on October 3, 1988, to the broadcast on August 9, 2019.

When voicing Uncle Jam, Masuoka avoided using a cold tone of voice and placed focus on the "warmth in his words" while portraying the character so that the children who watched the show could understand him. "Everyone's kindness truly translates into the warmth of their words, which I think is easy for children to accept", he said. "That's why Anpanman gives a sense of fulfillment and is such a wonderful work. It is a work that I keep hoping children around the world will continue to watch forever."

He had close friendships with the staff and cast members he worked with for many years. Keiko Toda, who voices Anpanman, said of Masuoka, "He is the oldest among the regular cast, so we call him 'Shippo' (Master)", and Michiyo Yanagisawa, who voices Currypanman, revealed that when she was troubled during the early days of the broadcast, Masuoka quietly invited her out for tea and offered words of encouragement.

According to Toda on her blog, Masuoka was quite depressed when Kaneta Kimotsuki, the original voice actor for Horrorman on the show, died in 2016, with Toda remarking, "They were of the same generation, weren't they? It's only natural."

Even after leaving the show, he kept in touch with the show's staff and cast, often visiting the recording studio up until his death.

== Filmography ==
=== Television animation ===
List of voice performances in television animation
Year	Title	Role(s)	Notes	Source
1964	Wolf Boy Ken	Kuma		
1965	Uchuu Patrol Hopper	Additional voice		
1965	Astro Boy	Additional voice		
1966	Osomatsu-kun	Watchmaker, Henchman, Customer at "L'Français" restaurant (Iyami's French Eaves), Boss of the Smog Family		
1967	Kaminari Boy Pikkaribee	Additional voice		
1967	Gokū no Daibōken	Hunter, One-eyed		
1968	The Monster Kid	Kyodaigon		
1968	Star of the Giants	Additional voice		
1968	Cyborg 009	005 / Geronimo Junior		
1968	Sally the Witch	Pesu		
1969	Plum Star Prince	Additional voice		
1969	Undersea Boy Marine	Henchman A, Man A		
1970	Ashita no Joe	Tarō		
1970	The Adventures of Hutch the Honeybee	Tokubee		
1970	Mōretsu Atarō	Police Chief, Taxi Driver		
1971	Attack No. 1	Additional voice		
1971	Sarutobi Ecchan	Additional voice		
1971	Kunimatsu-sama no Otoridai!	Additional voice		
1972	Astroganger	Monster		
1972	Apache Yakyūgun	Additional voice		
1972	Triton of the Sea	Gelpess	Second voice	
1972	Pinocchio: The Series	Monster snake		
1972	GeGeGe no Kitarō	Additional voice		
1972	Devilman	Zan'nin, Adult	First voice of Zan'nin	
1972	Mazinger Z	Additional voice		
1973	The Gutsy Frog	Rakugo Master, Additional voice		
1973	Babel II	Additional voice		
1974	Cutie Honey	Additional voice		
1974	Great Mazinger	Additional voice		
1974	Dororon Enma-kun	Additional voice		
1974	The Song of Tentomushi	A Week of Weight Gain		
1974	First Human Giatrus	Additional voice		
1975	Shogun in His Boyhood	Okuyama Denshin-sai		
1975	Time Bokan	Duncan, Demon's Head		
1976	Dino Mech Gaiking	Prometheus		
1976	Don Chuck Monogatari	Kurobe, Simon, Konkon Tayu		
1976	3000 Leagues in Search of Mother	Additional voice		
1976	Magne Robo Gakeen	Additional voice		
1976	Happy Section Chief	Additional voice		
1976	Maya the Honey Bee	Jack, Bird		
1977	Voltes V	Zool, General Oka, Noble B		
1977	Dokaben	Tako Hachi, Denkichi, Doctor, Chairman of the Board, President, Committee Chair		
1977	Tobidase! Machine Hiryū	Ockkanavitch	Main role	
1977	Yatterman	King Kamehameha		
1977	Wakakusa no Charlotte	Jackson, Mitchell, Bobson	Second voice of Bobson	
1978	Nobody's Boy: Remi	Pagès		
1978	Ikkyū-san	Additional voice		
1978	Sazae-san	Masuo Fuguta	Second voice	
1978	Her Majesty's Petite Angie	Silver		
1978	King Fang	Leader		
1978	Treasure Island	Additional voice		
1978	Haikara-San: Here Comes Miss Modern	Ushigoro		
1978	The Story of Perrine	Younger Brother		
1978	The Adventures of the Little Prince	Bird, Dongo		
1978	Majokko Tickle	Teacher Takakura		
1978	Manga Nihon Emaki	Additional voice		
1978	Future Boy Conan	Gucci		
1978	Song of Baseball Enthusiasts	Oka, Kintarō		
1978	Lupin the 3rd Part II	Counsel, Onabess' Aide	Counsel in episode 21, Onabess' Aide in Ep. 42	
1979	King Arthur and the Knights of the Round Table	Tontamu		
1979	Galaxy Express 999	Policeman, Gutara, Gandel, Shaward, Old Man, Castle Lord		
1979	Koguma no Misha	Village Chief		
1979	Gordian Warrior	Annonji		
1979	Doraemon	Shack Owner		
1979	Hana no Ko Lunlun	Additional voice		
1980	The Monster Kid	Additional voice		
1980	Ganbare Genki	Katsuzo Yamaya		
1980	Cyborg 009	Randolph		
1980	Sue Cat	Foreman		
1980	Astro Boy	Secretary-General, Gorō		
1980	The Wonderful Adventures of Nils	Mouse, Bear, Additional voice		
1980	Nextworld	Additional voice		
1980	The Rose of Versailles	Additional voice		
1980	Invincible Robo Trider G7	Shinkichi's father, the lodge owner		
1981	Urusei Yatsura	Additional voice		
1981	Dash Kappei	Okazaki		
1981	Dr. Slump – Arale-chan	Ocha-kun/Mr. Handy		
1981	Superbook	Gizmo the Crusading Robot		
1981	Bremen 4: Angels in Hell	Others	Television film	
1981	Manga Mito Kōmon	Additional voice		
1981	Yattodetaman	Don José		
1982	Scientific Rescue Team Technoboyger	Head of Department		
1982	Gyakuten! Ippatsuman	Benkei		
1982	Robby the Rascal	Yosaku, Dr. Deco (Deco-yama Bokota)		
1982	Sasuga no Sarutobi	Sarutobi Kogen, The Lady at the Okonomiyaki Restaurant		
1982	Tokimeki Tonight	Cheshire Cat, Jaws III		
1982	Miss Machiko	Old Man from Kagoshima, Mr. Arashi, Fortune Teller, Uncle Kinsan		
1982	Magical Princess Minky Momo	King		
1982	Lucy-May of the Southern Rainbow	Hoodie		
1983	Akū Daisakusen Srungle	Magician		
1983	Eagle Sam	Officer Bogey		
1983	The Yearling	Bag Forest		
1983	Nine	Katsuya's father		
1983	Personal Computer Travel Detective Team	Wind-up Clock		
1983	Plawres Sanshiro	Roger		
1983	Creamy Mami, the Magic Angel	Principal, Additional voice		
1983	Manga Japanese History	Tokugawa Ieyasu, Takahashi Kageyasu		
1983	Mīmu Iro Iro Yume no Tabi	Louis Pasteur, Louis Daguerre, Temple Carpenter		
1984	Glass Mask	Additional voice		
1984	Chō Kōsoku Galvion	Mosel		
1984	Katri, Girl of the Meadows	Teacher B		
1984	Sherlock Hound	George/Todd		
1984	Elves of the Forest	Additional voice		
1984	Ranpō	Dr. Hosamochi		
1985	Ashita Tenki ni Naare	Additional voice		
1985	Onegai! Samia-don	Additional voice		
1985	Dirty Pair	Salesman A		
1985	Touch	Toshio Asakura		
1986	GeGeGe no Kitarō	Ijuin, Mōryō		
1986	Animated Classics of Japanese Literature	Jūkichi Ōyama		
1986	Doteraman	Benkei		
1986	Bug tte Honey	Waldrado, Additional voice		
1986	Maison Ikkoku	Toshizō, Yakuza		
1986	Robotan	Additional voice		
1987	The Three Musketeers	Foreman		
1987	Mami the Psychic	Juro Sakura	Main role	
1987	Ganbare, Kickers!	Fujiwara		
1987	New Maple Town Stories: Palm Town Chapter	Director Stelberg	Ep. 4	
1988	Ultra B	Sushi Restaurant		
1988	Let's Go! Anpanman	Uncle Jam, Aokinman, Minister of the Right, Moo-san, Horse, Crocodile Man, Townspeople	First voice of Uncle Jam, Third and sixth voice of Moo-san	
1988	Ironfist Chinmi	Rōshi Rō		
1988	What's Michael?	Shinnosuke		
1988	Mister Ajikko	Musutaki		
1989	The Adventures of Hutch the Honeybee	The Mayor, Dr. Beetle, Tokubei		
1989	The New Adventures of Kimba The White Lion	Kutta		
1989	New Grimm's Fairy Tale Classics	Bear		
1989	The Tale of Osamu Tezuka: I'm Son-Goku	Sagojo	Television film	
1989	Madö King Granzört	Elder		
1989	Wrestler Gundan Seisenshi Robin Jr.	King Oora Fire-man		
1990	Samurai Pizza Cats	Zaikingoro		
1990	The Jungle Book	Abdullah		
1990	Let's Go! Anpanman: Save the Southern Sea!	Uncle Jam	Television special	
1990	Nadia: The Secret of Blue Water	Henri/George (Jean's uncle)		
1990	My Daddy Long Legs	Walter Griggs		
1991	Kinkyū Hasshin Saver Kids	Admiral Hope		
1991	Dragon Quest: The Adventure of Dai	Temujin		
1991	Ranma ½	Toramasa Kobayakawa		
1991	RPG Densetsu Hepoi	Captain		
1991	The Laughing Salesman	Kazuo Uwame, Yorimichi Ukai, Colleagues	Kazuo Uwame in Ep. 51, Yorimichi Ukai in Ep. 97	
1992	Cooking Papa	Tetsushi Higashiyama		
1992	Bush Baby, Little Angel of the Grasslands	Gideon		
1992	Nangoku Shōnen Papuwa-kun	Chappy		
1992	Fantasy Adventure: Nagagutsu o Haita Neko no Bōken	King		
1994	Tico and Friends	James		
1994	Magical Circle Guru Guru	Bado		
1994	The Brave Police J-Decker	Pierrot	Ep. 6	
1995	Saint Tail	Tangerine		
1995	Nintama Rantarō	Itaino Hida, Court Noble, Acrobat (Leader of a Band of Thieves), Male		
1996	The Legend of Zorro	Ed		
1996	Dragon Ball Z	Master Roshi	Second voice; Eps 288–291	
1996	Dragon Ball GT	Master Roshi		
1998	Touch: Are kara, Kimi wa... -Miss Lonely Yesterday-	Toshio Asakura (Minami Asakura's father)	Television special	
1999	We Know You, Moonlight Mask-kun!	Kamaboko President		
1999	Great Detective Conan	Nobuo Iwama, Takanori Genda	Nobuo Iwama in Ep. 161, Takanori Genda in Eps 325–327	
2000	Hidamari no Ki	Misaemon Tamaya	Ep. 15	
2001	Fruits Basket	Tohru's grandfather		
2002	Panyo Panyo Di Gi Charat	Elderly Gentleman		
2011	Nichijou	Voodoo doll, Narrator	Ep. 3	
2019	Everyday of Urashimasakatasen	School Principal		

=== Theatrical animation ===
List of voice performances in theatrical animation
Year	Title	Role	Notes	Source
1966	Cyborg 009	005 / Geronimo Junior		
1969	The Wonderful World of Puss 'n Boots	Big		
1984	Sherlock Hound: Blue Ruby Chapter and Treasure at the Bottom of the Ocean Chapter	Jewelry Store Manager		

=== Original video animation (OVA) ===
List of voice performances in original video animation
Year	Title	Role	Notes	Source
1989	Mobile Suit Gundam 0080: War in the Pocket	Dick Lumnba		
1992	Tenchi Muyo! Ryo-Ohki	Galactic Police Commander		
2008	Dragon Ball: Yo! Son Goku and His Friends Return!!	Master Roshi		

=== Video games ===
List of voice performances in video games
Year	Title	Role	Notes	Source
2002	Dragon Ball Z: Budokai	Master Roshi		
2004	Everybody's Golf Portable	Tanaka		
2005	Dragon Ball Z: Budokai 3	Master Roshi		
2005	Dragon Ball Z: Sparking!	Master Roshi		
2006	Dragon Ball Z: Sparking! Neo	Master Roshi		
2007	Dragon Ball Z: Sparking! Meteor	Master Roshi		
2008	Dragon Ball DS	Master Roshi		
2009	Dragon Ball: World's Greatest Adventure	Master Roshi		
2010	Dragon Ball DS 2: Charge! Red Ribbon Army	Master Roshi		
2012	Bravely Default	Sage Yulyana		

=== Tokusatsu ===
- Ultraman Leo – Ultraman King (Ep. 50)
- Android Kikaider – Orange Ant (Ep. 3), Gold Wolf (Ep. 11), Golden Bat (Ep. 15), Black Chameleon (Ep. 18), Green Mammoth (Eps 25 – 26), Red Squid (Ep. 30), Black Echidna (Ep. 34), Red Mine Toad (Eps 41 – 42)
- Android Kikaider Movie – Multi Colored Sand Lizard
- Kikaider 01 – Shadow Mummy (Ep. 16), Poisonous Mendicant (Ep. 17), Shadow Thorned Starfish No.02 (No.01 voiced by Setsuo Wakui) (Ep. 23)
- Inazuman – Wind Banbara (Ep. 5), Devil Banbara (Ep. 12)
- Himitsu Sentai Gorenger – Shining Masked, Ironclaw Masked, Hatchet Masked, Phone Masked, Shellfish Masked, Clock Masked, Can opener Masked, Piano Masked,
- Battle Fever J – Left Hand Monster
- Dengeki Sentai Changeman – Navigator Gator
- Jikuu Senshi Spielban – Dreampacker
- Gosei Sentai Dairanger – Haniwa Ventriloquist (Ep. 16)
- B-Fighter Kabuto – Rock Shell Chamberlain Dord
- Hyakujuu Sentai Gaoranger – Narrator, Gao God
- Kamen Rider Hibiki Hyper Battle DVD – Madder Hawk

=== Dubbing ===
==== Live-action ====
- Blue Steel (1993 Fuji TV edition) – Frank Turner (Philip Bosco)
- Child's Play 3 – Colonel Francis Cochrane (Dakin Matthews)
- Die Hard 2 (1994 TV Asahi edition) – Sgt. Al Powell (Reginald VelJohnson)
- Harlem Nights – Sgt. Phil Cantone (Danny Aiello)
- Muppet Treasure Island – Blind Pew
- National Lampoon's Christmas Vacation – Eddie Johnson (Randy Quaid)
- The NeverEnding Story III (1996 TV Asahi edition) – Mrs. Rockbiter

==== Animation ====
- The Rescuers Down Under – Doctor Mouse

== Awards ==
Year	Award	Category	Result
2018	12th Seiyu Awards	Merit Award	Won
