= Takkō Ishimori =

Japanese voice actor

- 石森 達幸
- Born: Tatsuyuki Ishimori; January 11, 1932; Hashima Island, Nagasaki, Japan
- Died: June 5, 2013 (aged 81)
- Occupation: Voice actor
- Agent: Arts Vision

Takkō Ishimori (石森 達幸, Ishimori Takkō; January 11, 1932 – June 5, 2013) was a Japanese voice actor from Nagasaki Prefecture, Japan. He debuted in 1960, and was attached to the talent agency Arts Vision at the time of his death in 2013. He was one of the founding members of Theater Echo. He was best known for voicing Sengoku in One Piece.

Ishimori died on June 5, 2013, at the age of 81 from heart failure.

== Filmography ==
=== Television animation ===
1960s

- Star of the Giants (1968) – Sadaharu Oh

1970s

- Demetan Croaker, The Boy Frog (1973) – Sawagani
- Hurricane Polymar (1974) – Flider
- Rascal the Raccoon (1977) – Herman Sunderland
- Angie Girl (1978) – Barkley
- The Story of Perrine (1978) – César
- The Rose of Versailles (1979) – A bookseller

1980s

- Ideon (1980) – Doba Ajiba
- Super Dimension Century Orguss (1983) – Roberto
- Mobile Suit Zeta Gundam (1985) – Franklin Bidan
- Musashi no Ken (1985) – Gondou-sensei
- Mobile Suit Gundam ZZ (1986) – Karahan
- Manga Nihon Keizai Nyuumon (1987) – Funeoka
- Mister Ajikko (1987) – Bravo Ojisan
- Sally the Witch (1989) – Yoshiko's father

1990s

- Kinkyū Hasshin Saver Kids (1991) – Matsugorou
- Kinnikuman: Kinnikusei Oui Soudatsu-hen (1991) – Chairman Harabote; Dr. Bombay; Ashuraman (First); Pinchman
- Jeanie with the Light Brown Hair (1992) – Big Joe
- Madō King Granzort (1992) – Gus' grandfather
- Super Bikkuriman (1992) – Super Zeus
- Magic Knight Rayearth (1994) – Chang Ang as of episode 31
- Mobile Fighter G Gundam (1994) – Zuisen
- Wedding Peach (1995) – Daruma
- Case Closed (1996) – Negishi, Shiota, Orita
- Harimogu Harry (1996) – Principal Shirakansu
- Kindaichi Case Files (1997) – Tsubaki
- Master of Mosquiton '99 (1997) – Hopper
- Pokémon (1997) – Babaa; Ghos (talking, ep 20); Santa Claus
- Outlaw Star (1998) – Old Man

2000s

- Hamtaro (2000) – Chourouhamu/Elder-Ham
- PaRappa the Rapper (2001) – Santa Claus
- Cyborg 009 (2002) – Dr. Eckerman
- Galaxy Angel Z (2002) – Village Elder
- One Piece (2003) – Fleet Admiral Sengoku
- R.O.D the TV (2003) – Principal Uchida
- Tetsujin 28-go (2004) – Chief Secretary
- Buzzer Beater (2005) – Yoshimune
- Gunparade March (2005) – Sea captain
- Eureka Seven (2006) – Gonzy
- Wan Wan Celeb Soreyuke! Tetsunoshin (2006) – Toranosuke Inuyama
- Les Misérables: Shōjo Cosette (2007) – Fauchelevent
- Moribito: Guardian of the Spirit (2007) – Hibitonan

2010s

- Fullmetal Alchemist: Brotherhood (2010) – King of Xerxes
- Psychic Detective Yakumo (2010) – Shinji Kunimatsu
- Bunny Drop (2011) – Matsui

=== OVA ===
- Dominion: Tank Police (1988) – Father (Chaplain)
- Gunbuster (1988) – Principal
- Ys (1989) – Klarze
- Detonator Orgun (1991) – Foreston
- K.O. Beast (1992) – Dr. Password
- One Piece - Defeat The Pirate Ganzak! (1998) – Skid
- Pocket Monsters: Pikachu's Winter Vacation 2000 (1999) – Santa
- Pocket Monsters: Pikachu's Winter Vacation 2001 (2000) – Santa Claus
- Murder Princess (2007) – Jodo Entolasia

=== Theatrical animation ===
- Mobile Suit Gundam - The Movie Trilogy (1981) – Reed
- The Ideon: Be Invoked (1982) – Doba Ajiba
- Doraemon: The Record of Nobita's Parallel Visit to the West (1988) – Kinkaku
- Mobile Suit Gundam: Char's Counterattack (1988) – Clop Captain
- Stink Bomb (1995) – Doctor
- Mobile Suit Gundam - The Movie Trilogy (Special Edition) (2000) – Gopp
- Princess Arete (2001) – Elder Counsellor
- Millennium Actress (2002) – Clerk
- Tetsujin 28-go: Morning Moon of Midday (2007) – Chief Cabinet Secretary

=== Tokusatsu ===
- Seijuu Sentai Gingaman (1998) – Kugutsudayuu (ep. 17)

=== Video games ===
- Mega Man 2: The Power Fighters (1996) – Dr. Light, Dr. Wily
- Ken-chan to Chie Asobi (1997)
- Jeanne D'Arc (2006) – Duke of Bedford
- Kingdom Hearts Birth by Sleep (2010) – Bashful

=== Dubbing ===
==== Live-action ====
- Arachnophobia – Irv Kendall (Roy Brocksmith)
- A Beautiful Mind – Helinger (Judd Hirsch)
- The Big Brawl – Judge (Larry Drake)
- Bill & Ted's Excellent Adventure – Socrates (Tony Steedman)
- Bulletproof Monk – Bulletproof Monk (Mako Iwamatsu)
- The Cannonball Run – Mel (Mel Tillis)
- Dark City – Mr. Book (Ian Richardson)
- Ed – Chubb (Jack Warden)
- The Exorcist: Director's Cut – Father Lankester Merrin (Max von Sydow)
- Exorcist: The Beginning – Jefferies (Alan Ford)
- Fly Away Home – Dr. Killian (David Hemblen)
- From Hell – Sir William Gull (Ian Holm)
- Ghostbusters II (1998 TV Asahi edition) – Mayor "Lenny" (David Margulies)
- Harry Potter and the Chamber of Secrets – Sorting Hat
- Harry Potter and the Deathly Hallows – Part 2 – Sorting Hat
- Harry Potter and the Philosopher's Stone – Sorting Hat
- Independence Day – General William Grey (Robert Loggia)
- The Money Pit – Walter Fielding Sr. (Douglass Watson)
- The Negotiator (2001 TV Asahi edition) – Commander Grant Frost (Ron Rifkin)
- Nemesis – Commissioner Farnsworth (Tim Thomerson)
- On Deadly Ground – Hugh Palmer (Richard Hamilton)
- Planet of the Apes – Senator Sandar (David Warner)
- Ronin – Jean-Pierre (Michael Lonsdale)
- Secret Window – Sheriff Dave Newsome (Len Cariou)
- She-Wolf of London – Dad Matheson (Arthur Cox)
- The Valachi Papers (1974 TV Asahi edition) – Lucky Luciano (Angelo Infanti)
- Wall Street (1991 Fuji TV edition) – Lou Mannheim (Hal Holbrook)
- Willy Wonka & the Chocolate Factory (2009 DVD edition) – Grandpa Joe (Jack Albertson)

==== Animation ====
- Animaniacs – Albert Einstein
- Who Framed Roger Rabbit – Baby Herman

=== Successors ===
- Toru Okawa—One Piece: Sengoku
- Akio Nojima—Police Story: prosecutor
- Cho—Nintama Rantaro: Tada Dozen
