= Robby the Rascal =

Japanese anime television series

- Cybot Robotchi
- LP album of Cybot Robotchi (1982). Pictured are Robotchi (Robby the Rascal) and Kurumi (Tiffany).

サイボットロボッチ (Saibotto Robocchi)
- Genre: Comedy, science fiction
- Anime television series
- Directed by: Kazuyuki Okasako (Chief director)
- Produced by: Hyota Ezu (TV Tokyo); Hiroshi Toida
- Written by: Toyohiro Ando et al.
- Music by: Jun Irie; Bullets (English version)
- Studio: Knack Productions
- Original network: TV Tokyo
- Original run: October 7, 1982 – June 29, 1983
- Episodes: 39

Cybot Robotchi (サイボットロボッチ, Saibotto Robocchi), known in the United States as Robby the Rascal, is a 39-episode anime television series created by Ken Ishikawa and produced by Knack animation studio. The series aired on TV Tokyo in Japan from October 1982 to June 1983. The series featured contributions from Tetsuro Amino as a storyboard artist and Masayuki Kojima as an episode director.

A feature-length English-dubbed version comprising several episodes edited together into a movie, titled Robby the Rascal, was produced by Jim Terry's (Force Five) Kidpix Productions and released on home video in the United States in 1985. (The same American distributors had previously adapted the same animation studio's 1979–1980 TV series Manga Sarutobi Sasuke, which used much of the same production team, into a similar feature-length work titled Ninja the Wonder Boy.) However, the English version deleted much of the risque humor that, while not uncommon in children's animation in Japan, would be considered unacceptable by American standards, with the policewoman Sachiko (Sgt. Sally) being the usual target of the fan service-oriented humor. The TV series also aired in its entirety in Italy under the title Robottino ("Little robot"), and some episodes are also available in Spanish as Robotete or Robotín.

== Story ==
Apparently inspired largely by Akira Toriyama's popular Dr. Slump, Robby the Rascal is the story of Robby (Robotchi), a fun-loving, mischievous robot with a TV set in his stomach. Robby lives in a peaceful village with various other robots, all created by the eccentric and lecherous Dr. Art Deco, who has a major crush on local policewoman Sgt. Sally (Sachiko). Although he is an android and (usually inadvertently) causes much mischief, Robby has a warm, kind heart and is always willing to help out a friend in need. With his human girlfriend Tiffany (Kurumi Yukino), he gets into a variety of wacky adventures.

However, a rich, spoiled inventor named Horace (Highbrow) will stop at nothing to get Robby for his own. Much of the plot of the English feature-length dub of the anime involves Horace's attempts to threaten the peace in Robby's village, with the help of his female assistants, Tracy (Sylvia) and Yvette (Nancy). For example, in one story arc, Horace uses an illusion-causing ray gun to spoil Robby and Tiffany's spring picnic and then manages to capture the little robot and force him to compete in a high-stakes game of tennis. In another, he follows Robby, Dr. Deco and their friends to Europe, where he and Robby square off in a medieval-style joust. And in the final story arc, Horace and his minions compete against Robby and Tiffany in a global race in which the first prize is $10 million, which Dr. Deco hopes to use to start an amusement park.

== Music ==
The Japanese opening and ending themes to the Cybot Robotchi TV series were performed by Yukari Sato. The Italian dubbed version of the TV series kept all of the original music, including the Japanese theme songs, and also retained most of the original character names (except for Robotchi who became "Robottino"). However, for the English version, the original music was replaced by a new soundtrack by Bullets, including several original songs.

== Staff ==
Japanese Version Source(s)

- Created by: Ken Ishikawa, Toyohiro Ando
- Chief director: Kazuyuki Okasako
- Assistant director: Hiroyuki Kamii (eps. 1-21)
- Storyboard/Episode directors: Kazuyuki Okasako, Hiroyuki Kamii, Hiroshi Yoshida, Osamu Inoe, Tetsuro Amino, Masayuki Kojima
- Script: Ayuko Anzai, Hideki Sonoda, Susumu Yoshida, Toyohiro Ando, Yoshiyuki Suga
- Character design: Dynamic Planning
- Animation directors: Hiromi Nakamura, Noboru Akiyama, Takao Suzuki, Kinuko Izumi
- Art director: Masayoshi Banno
- Director of photography: Yosuke Moriguchi
- Music: Jun Irie
- Producers: Hyota Ezu (TV Tokyo), Hiroshi Toida
- Theme Songs: OP- Cybot Robotchi (lyrics by Yukari Sato, composition by Tetsuro Oda, arrangement by Jun Irie), ED- Wai! Wai! Wai! (lyrics by Yukari Sato, composition and arrangement by Jun Irie)
- Theme song performance: Yukari Sato
- Voice Cast: Natsumi Sakuma (Robotchi), Hiroshi Masuoka (Dr. Deko), Aya Mizoguchi (Sylvie), Yoko Kawanami (Kurumi), Masako Miura (Uzura), Nobuo Tomita (Bob), Eiko Yamada (Sachiko)
- Production: Knack Co., Ltd. / TV Tokyo

English Version

Opening credits

- Executive Producer: Joseph Adelman
- Original Music by Bullets
- Written by Collins Walker
- Produced and Directed by Jim Terry

Closing credits

- The End/A Jim Terry Production
- Edited by Collins Walker
- Assistant Editor: James Terry Jr.
- Production Assistant: John Terry
- Cast of Characters: Ed Victor, Sandra Allyson, Reed Harmon, Tae McMullen, Scott Schwimer, Brenda Colbreth
- ©MCMLXXXV Kidpix – Knack Kikaku, Inc.
