= Little Tokyo Life =

Japanese variety show

Little Tokyo Life (リトルトーキョーライフ Ritorutōkyōraifu) is a Japanese variety show, airing every Wednesday on TV Tokyo. The hosts of the show are members of Hey! Say! JUMP and Johnny's West, who take turns presenting the show. It has been airing since October 2014.
