= Attacker You! =

Japanese manga series

- The third volume of the Italian edition of the Attacker You! manga.

アタッカーYou!
- Genre: Romance, Sports
- Manga
- Written by: Jun Makimura; Shizuo Koizumi
- Published by: Kodansha
- Magazine: Nakayoshi
- Original run: April 13, 1984 – June 24, 1985
- Volumes: 3
- Anime television series
- Directed by: Kazuyuki Okaseko; Masari Sasahiro
- Music by: Shirō Sagisu
- Studio: Knack Productions
- Original network: TV Tokyo
- Original run: April 13, 1984 – June 21, 1985
- Episodes: 58
- Anime television series

New Attacker You!
- Directed by: Tomoharu Katsumata
- Music by: Shiro Sagisu
- Studio: Knack Productions
- Original network: Darian Cartoon
- Original run: 2008
- Episodes: 52

Attacker You! (アタッカーYou!, Atakkā Yū!) is a 1984 Japanese manga series by Jun Makimura and Shizuo Koizumi published by Kodansha. An anime series, consisting of 58 episodes of 24 minutes each, was produced by Knack Productions and broadcast by TV Tokyo from April 13, 1984, to June 21, 1985. The DVD version was released in Japan on August 20, 2004.

The Attacker You! anime, despite mediocre ratings in Japan, achieved a strong level of popularity in several European countries, including Italy (Mila e Shiro, due cuori nella pallavolo), France (Jeanne et Serge), Spain (called both Dos fuera de serie and Juana y Sergio), Portugal (Joana e Sérgio, O Desafio dos Anjos) and Poland (Pojedynek Aniołów). The anime has been rerun several times in Italy since its original broadcast there, and the manga was also released in Italy. As of summer 2020, no incarnation of the anime has been licensed in North America.

== Plot ==
Attacker You! is the story of an ambitious and energetic thirteen-year-old junior high school girl You (pronounced Yu) Hazuki, who moves to Tokyo from the Japanese countryside, where she lived with her grandparents, to live with her father Toshihiko, a cameraman recently returned from Peru, and attend Hikawa Junior High School. You's mother is not in the picture, having left when You was very young. Also living with You and her father is her adoptive younger brother Sunny (adopted by Toshihiko while he was in Peru), who is very attached to his stepsister and tends to follow her everywhere she goes, including to school and her volleyball matches. However, You's father is not supportive of her playing volleyball, and she is puzzled as to why he gets so angry about it. You is also a fan of Kanako Tajima, a television color commentator for volleyball games, and notices that her father also acts strangely whenever she watches Tajima on TV or sees a picture of her.

You, who has exceptional jumping abilities, is passionate about volleyball and dreams of one day being a part of Japan's national women's volleyball team in the 1988 Seoul Olympics. She joins Hikawa Junior High's girls' volleyball team. Despite You's natural talents, her early days on the team are rocky, as she is initially clueless as to the mechanics and logistics of playing on a team and frequently clashes with the team's top player, the cold and arrogant Nami Hayase (who is made captain after the original captain, Kuro, is forced to quit because of a knee injury), and Nami's clique. In addition, Daimon, her coach, is severe to the point of near brutality (more so in the anime, he wasn't as bad in the original manga) and behaves violently toward his players when they make mistakes or fail to live up to his expectations; after one match early in the series, he slaps every girl on the team across the face for allowing the opposing team to score one point (even though they won 15 to 1). In time, however, You's confidence and optimism build her into one of the team's best players.

You also soon sets her eyes on Sho Takiki, the handsome, dashing captain of Hikawa's boys' volleyball team. Nami also favors Sho, which adds an extra dimension to the rivalry between her and You. The clingy You puts as much energy into trying to get Sho's attention as she does into her game, and even takes to attending extra training sessions coached by Sho in the morning before school just to be near him. In time Sho begins to fall for You as well, but eventually realizes that the true love of his life is sports, although You remains hopeful that she can win his heart one day.

Eventually, You and Nami warm to each other and form a tumultuous friendship, which comes to a head when Nami joins an opposing professional team coached by the brutal Daimon. You also befriends ace attacker Eri Takigawa, a girl from a rival team, the "Sunlight Players"; You and Eri eventually join the same professional team.

== Cast ==
- Yuko Kobayashi as You Hazuki
- Naoko Matsui as Nami Hayase
- Kazuyuki Sogabe as Shingo Mitamura
- Michihiro Ikemizu as Toshihiko Hazuki (You's father)
- Yumi Takada as Eri Takigawa
- Satoko Kito as Kuro and Meiko "Chibi" Nanao
- Kumiko Takizawa as Kanako Tajima
- Roko Takizawa as Taka

== Staff ==
- Creator: Shizuo Koizumi
- Director: Kazuyuki Okaseko, Masari Sasahiro
- Scripts: Hideki Sonoda, Yoshihisa Araki, Susumu Yoshida
- Animation Director: Satoshi Kishimo
- Character Designs: Jun Makimura, Teruo Kigure, Kyomu Fukuda
- Music: Shiro Sagisu
- Theme Songs: OP- Seishun Prelude (Prelude of Youth), ED- Twinkle, Twinkle, performed by Harumi Kamo
- Theme Song Performance: Harumi Kamo (original version), Cristina D'Avena (Italian version)

== Western versions and connection to Attack No. 1 ==
Many of the character names were changed for the Italian, French, Spanish and Portuguese versions of the Attacker You! anime. In the Italian version, You is Mila Hazuki and Sho is Shiro Takiki. In the French version, You becomes Jeanne, Sho is Serge, Nami Hayase's name is changed to Peggy Hayase (her name remains Nami in the Italian version), Eri Takigawa becomes Marie Takigawa (Kaori Takigawa in the Italian version); the Spanish dub, which was based on the French version, used the French names for Nami and Eri, although You was renamed Juana and Sho became Sergio (the Spanish versions of the characters' respective French names), as was in other European versions, the names in Portuguese version were changed too, You is Joana Hazuki and Sho is Sérgio, Nami Hayase's name is changed to Nádia. The Italian theme song sung by Cristina D'Avena is also considered a classic in Italy, and the French and Spanish theme songs use the same melody in the vernacular language, the Portuguese opening and ending were dubbed from original Japanese version.

Although Attacker You! was not released in the German market, Kozue, the heroine of the earlier volleyball drama Attack No. 1, was named Mila (as You Hazuki was for the Italian Attacker You!) in the German-dubbed version of that 1969 series (retitled Mila Superstar, which also curiously uses the same theme song melody as the Italian, French and Spanish Attacker You! dubs).

European versions of the Attacker You! anime also created a link between this series and Attack No. 1 which did not exist in the original Japanese versions. In the Italian version, Mila (You) is a cousin of Mimì Ayuhara (the Italian name for Kozue of Attack No. 1, since Kozue's name was changed to Mimi in the second Italian dub in 1983, naming her after Mimi of Attack on Tomorrow, another volleyball anime that aired in Italy the previous year), and dreams of becoming a volleyball star just like her. This alteration to the storyline carried over into the French- and Spanish-dubbed versions of the anime. Thus, Attacker You! is sometimes considered a spinoff of Attack No. 1, although there is in Japan no connection between the two series. Nippon Animation's 1977 TV series Attack on Tomorrow is the closest thing to an actual "sequel" or "spinoff" to Attack No. 1, although it also technically is not a spinoff or sequel as it's not based on a manga, unlike Attack No. 1.

In addition, the Italian production staff censored some potentially objectionable content from the original Japanese version, namely scenes of Coach Daimon's brutal and violent behaviour toward his players and occasional scenes of bare breasts in shower scenes. These edits carried over into the French dub, while the cut scenes were retained in the Spanish version.

== Sequel ==
New Attacker You (続・アタッカーYou 金メダルへの道, Zoku atakkā You- kin medaru e no michi) is a television series anime of 52 episodes, production Japanese and Chinese sequel of the famous Attacker You! realized 24 years after the first airing. This second animated series was produced by Knack Productions in 2008 during the Beijing Olympics of the same year. The series, directed by Tomoharu Katsumata, first aired in China on the issuer Darian Cartoon and then distributed directly to DVD in Japan without a TV broadcast.

The original series has two different dubbings: in Chinese for the country of China, and in Japanese for the country of Japan; for the latter, which features an entirely new cast from the classic series, the recordings of all characters' voices were done over at Aoni Production. New Attacker You was also broadcast on Hero TV in the Philippines. Outside of Asia, the series is not very well known. In 2011 it aired in Italy with the title Mila e Shiro - Il sogno continua, but received much criticism from the older fans of the 1984 original version of the cartoon.

=== Plot ===
The story, rather than held in Japan, moved to China. The events take place several years after the Seoul Olympics of 1988, when it stopped the plot of the previous series. The team of Dragon Ladies, after losing the championship, is likely to melt. Enter the scene to intervene three stars of volleyball: Yang Ming (Ms. Nishi), Nami Hayase and So Tachiki, the latter in the role of coach. Among the main characters is Woo Glin (Shoko Hota), a champion of Kung-Fu. Noted during a fight, Ming becomes convinced that her team could be reborn and, after passing an audition, Glin (Hota) enters to join. To further strengthen the team, Nami proposes to So to go to Japan to take Yu Hazuki, who in the meantime, after hard and constant training, is back in shape after breaking her Achilles tendon two years earlier during a game with her friend Eri Takigawa, who had an accident that ended her Olympic career.
