= The New Adventures of Kimba The White Lion =

Japanese anime television series

- ジャングル大帝
- Based on: Kimba the White Lion by Osamu Tezuka
- Written by: Mitsuru Majima; Miharu Hirami
- Directed by: Takashi Ui
- Music by: Tomoyuki Asakawa
- Country of origin: Japan
- Original language: Japanese
- No. of episodes: 52

Production
- Producers: Ryōhei Nakamura; Haruyuki Iguchi (TX); Daisuke Baba (Nikkeisha); Kuniaki Ōnishi (Gakken)
- Animator: Tezuka Productions
- Production companies: TV Tokyo; Nikkeisha; Gakken

Original release
- Network: TXN (TV Tokyo)
- Release: October 12, 1989 – October 11, 1990

The New Adventures of Kimba The White Lion (ジャングル大帝, Janguru/Jungle-Taitei) is an anime television series produced by Tezuka Productions that first ran from October 12, 1989, to October 11, 1990, on TV Tokyo. It is a remake of Osamu Tezuka's 1960s anime series Kimba the White Lion.

== Original Japanese cast ==
- Megumi Hayashibara as Leo/Kimba (young)
- Sakiko Tamagawa as Liya
- Shinnosuke Furumoto as Leo/Kimba (cub)
- Hiroshi Masuoka as Kutter
- Isao Sasaki as Panja
- Kappei Yamaguchi as Kenichi
- Kei Tomiyama as Ham Egg
- Mahito Tsujimura as Ban Shunsaku
- Masako Nozawa as Gibo
- Rokuro Naya as Lamp
- Ryusei Nakao as Toto
- Shigeru Chiba as Coco
- Sukekiyo Kameyama as Tony

== English dub cast ==
In 1998 which was nearly a decade after the original Japanese release, Pioneer Family Entertainment (which then became Geneon Universal which is now known as NBCUniversal Entertainment Japan as of today) has gotten the rights to pick up the series and for distribution in North America under license from Nippon Herald Films. They along with Ocean Studios in Vancouver, Canada, worked together to produce an English dub of the series with an all-star Canadian voice cast, using the Wordfit System and with Karl Williams serving as the director.

Only 13 out of 52 episodes were dubbed in English and the series was left on a cliffhanger, due to the poor quality of the dubbing. From October 13, 1998, to July 27, 1999, six VHS volumes were released across North America with the first tape having three episodes and the rest having two. Episodes 2 and 3 were not dubbed for the English-speaking market mostly due to the content, despite having its importance in the series' through that particular arc. So Pioneer decided to have that arc skipped, thus having Episodes 1, followed by 4 up to 15 dubbed. On top of that, the episodes were edited heavily during production of the English adaptation dub, involving scenes cut and changed, as well as having the score entirely redone digitally. The music was composed by Tom Keenlyside and John Mitchell and with the editing being handled by Gina Mueller and Eric LeBlanc.

- Kathleen Barr
- Ben Baxter
- Lisa Ann Beley as Raiya
- Don Brown as Caesar/Panja and Coco
- Michael Dobson
- Paul Dobson as Jamar
- Marcy Goldberg
- Christopher Gray
- Saffron Henderson
- Janyse Jaud
- David Kaye as Icara
- Campbell Lane
- Andrea Libman
- Lalainia Lindbjerg
- Scott McNeil
- Richard Newman as Old Dice
- Ward Perry
- Gerard Plunkett
- Alvin Sanders
- Kelly Sheridan as Riona
- Matt Smith
- Robert O. Smith as Tony
- Chantal Strand
- Brad Swaile as Kimba/Leo (cub)
- Venus Terzo
- French Tickner as Kutter
- Cathy Weseluck

== Episodes ==
No.	Title	Original release date
1	"Birth"	October 12, 1989
TBA
2	"Promise"	October 12, 1989
TBA
3	"Departure"	October 19, 1989
TBA
4	"Friends"	October 26, 1989
TBA
5	"Hometown"	November 2, 1989
TBA
6	"Intruder"	November 9, 1989
TBA
7	"Courage"	November 16, 1989
TBA
8	"Advice"	November 23, 1989
TBA
9	"Fellows"	November 30, 1989
TBA
10	"Freedom"	December 7, 1989
TBA
11	"The Law Of The Forest"	December 14, 1989
TBA
12	"Red Wings"	December 21, 1989
TBA
13	"Prophecy"	December 28, 1989
TBA
14	"Wild Nature"	January 4, 1990
TBA
15	"Failure"	January 11, 1990
TBA
16	"White Beast"	January 18, 1990
TBA
17	"Pride"	January 25, 1990
TBA
18	"Fighting Spirit"	February 1, 1990
TBA
19	"Life"	February 8, 1990
TBA
20	"Leader"	February 15, 1990
TBA
21	"Coming Home"	February 22, 1990
TBA
22	"Meeting Again"	March 1, 1990
TBA
23	"Migration"	March 8, 1990
TBA
24	"Friendship"	March 15, 1990
TBA
25	"Sacrifice: Part 1"	March 22, 1990
TBA
26	"Sacrifice: Part 2"	March 29, 1990
TBA
27	"Sorrow at parting"	April 5, 1990
TBA
28	"Image"	April 5, 1990
TBA
29	"Protection"	April 19, 1990
TBA
30	"Adventure"	April 26, 1990
TBA
31	"Trust"	May 3, 1990
TBA
32	"Nature"	May 10, 1990
TBA
33	"Paradise"	May 17, 1990
TBA
34	"Illusionary Moment"	May 24, 1990
TBA
35	"Threat"	May 31, 1990
TBA
36	"Reconciliation"	June 7, 1990
TBA
37	"Father"	June 14, 1990
TBA
38	"Best Friend"	June 21, 1990
TBA
39	"Nightmare"	June 28, 1990
TBA
40	"Escape"	July 5, 1990
TBA
41	"Premonition"	July 12, 1990
TBA
42	"Coexistence"	July 26, 1990
TBA
43	"Decision"	August 2, 1990
TBA
44	"Sneaking in"	August 9, 1990
TBA
45	"Rebirth"	August 23, 1990
TBA
46	"Longing"	August 30, 1990
TBA
47	"Aureola"	September 6, 1990
TBA
48	"Challenge"	September 13, 1990
TBA
49	"Assembly"	September 20, 1990
TBA
50	"Victory"	September 27, 1990
TBA
51	"Harmony: Part 1"	October 11, 1990
TBA
52	"Harmony: Part 2"	October 11, 1990
TBA
