= Knack Productions =

Japanese animation studio

ICHI Corporation
- Native name: 株式会社ICHI
- Formerly: Knack Productions (1967–2008)
- Industry: Anime; OVA
- Founder: Seiichi Hayashi; Seiichi Nishino
- Headquarters: Tokyo, Japan
- Key people: Seiichi Nishino; Go Nagai; Yoshikata Nitta; Ken Ishikawa

ICHI Corporation (株式会社ICHI, Kabushikigaisha ICHI), formerly known as Knack Productions (株式会社KnacK, Kabushikigaisha KnacK) or simply Knack (ナック, Nakku) until August 2008, is a Japanese anime and film production company.

== History ==
Knack Productions was founded on September 25, 1967, by a group of former employees of Toei Animation and Osamu Tezuka's Mushi Production, including illustrator Seiichi Hayashi, animator/director Sadao Tsukioka, former Mushi producer Sakuro Koyanagi, and Seiichi Nishino, who would become the principal planner of most of the studio's works. From its early days the studio concentrated on TV production. The studio's first work, the TV series Granny Mischief (Ijiwaru Baasan), based on a manga by Sazae-san creator Machiko Hasegawa), premiered in 1970. In the late 1980s the company moved away from TV production and into OVA, finding success in the growing market for soft-core direct-to-video pornography anime. Since the late 1990s, Knack (renamed ICHI Corporation in August 2008) has focused chiefly on live-action production. The company's most recent animation work, in 1997, was on the adult anime OVA Slight Fever Syndrome and with production assistance on Gainax's The End of Evangelion.

Despite the number of anime-industry notables who worked with Knack over the years (including Go Nagai, Ken Ishikawa, Kazuyuki Okasako, Masayuki Kojima, Tetsuro Amino, Shun'ichi Yukimuro, Yoshikata Nitta, and Fumio Ikeno), the studio developed a dubious reputation for the low quality of its productions, particularly in regard to animation quality and to copying the premises of other, more popular shows, even when compared to their contemporaries in both Japan and America. Nevertheless, a number of the studio's productions did become internationally successful, including the children's anthropomorphic cartoon series Don Chuck Monogatari; The Adventures of the Little Prince; and Attacker You!, a volleyball drama which achieved a staggering level of popularity when exported to Italy and France. The studio's children's comedies Manga Sarutobi Sasuke and Cybot Robotchi were also released in the U.S. as direct-to-video feature-length edits titled Ninja the Wonder Boy and Robby the Rascal, respectively. In more recent years, the studio's 1974 series Chargeman Ken! has become an online sensation, due to mockery of its limited production values.

== Animated works ==
=== TV series ===
- Granny Mischief (Ijiwaru Baasan, いじわるばあさん) (1970–1971)
- Moonlight Mask (Seigi wo asuru mono, Gekko Kamen, 正義を愛する人、月光仮面) (1972)
- Astroganger (アストロガンガー) (1972–1973)
- Chargeman Ken! (チャージマン研！) (1974)
- Dame Oyaji (ダメおやじ) (1974)
- Don Chuck Monogatari/Shin Don Chuck Monogatari (ドンチャック物語, 新 ドンチャック物語) (1975–1977)
- Groizer X (グロイザーX) (1976–1977, created by Go Nagai)
- The Adventures of the Little Prince (Hoshi no ojisama Puchi Prince, 星の王子さま プチ・プランス) (1978–1979)
- Ninja the Wonder Boy (Manga Sarutobi Sasuke, まんが猿飛佐助) (1979–1980)
- Sue Cat (スーキャット) (1980)
- Manga Mito Kōmon (まんが水戸黄門) (1981–1982)
- Robby the Rascal (Cybot Robotchi, サイボットロボッチ) (1982–1983, created by Ken Ishikawa)
- Hitotsuboshike no Ultra Baasan (一ツ星家のウルトラ婆さん) (1982–1983)
- Psycho Armor Govarian (サイコアーマー ゴーバリアン) (1983, created by Go Nagai)
- The Voyages of Doctor Dolittle (ドリトルせんせいものがたり) (1984, U.S.-Japan coproduction, not aired in Japan until 1997)
- Attacker You! (アタッカーYOU!) (1984–1985)
- Oh! Family (Oh！ファミリー) (1986–1987)
- Manga Nihon Keizai Nyuumon (マンガ日本経済入門) (1987–1988)
- Momotaro Densetsu (桃太郎伝説 PEACHBOY LEGEND) (1989–1990)
- Peach Command: Shin Momotaru Densetsu (PEACH COMMAND 新桃太郎伝説) (1990–1991)
- New Attacker You (続・アタッカーYOU 金メダルへの道 Zoku atakkā YOU- kin medaru e no michi?) (2008)

=== Standard OVA ===
- Toumei Shounen Tantei Akira (透明少年探偵アキラ) (circa 1970)
- Male Transfrom Female Mayumi chan (男変形女マユミちゃん) (1986ー1987)
- Shibuya Honky Tonk (渋谷ホンキィトンク) (1988)
- Korogashi Ryota (ころがし涼太) (1990–1991)
- Furiten-kun (フリテンくん) (1990)
- Osaka Tough Guys (Naniwa Yūkyōden , なにわ遊侠伝) series (1992–1993)
- Crows (クローズ) (1993–1994)
- Grappler Baki: The Ultimate Fighter (グラップラー刃牙) (1994)
- Submarine 707 (深海の艦隊 サブマリン707) (1997)

=== Adult OVAs (as Knack+) ===
- Ninja Transfrom Mako-Chan (忍者変身マコちゃん) (1986-1987)
- Shin Otoko Henkei Jo Mayumi chan (1989-1990)
- Bōken Shite mo ii Koro (冒険してもいい頃) series (1989–1990)
- Yaruki Manman (やるきまんまん) series (1989–1991)
- Dance Till Tomorrow (Asatte DaNCE, あさってDaNCE) (1991)
- Mellow (1993)
- Vixens (Visionary, ヴィジョナリィ) (1995–1996)
- Lunatic Night (ルナティックナイト) (1996–1997)
- Slight Fever Syndrome (Binetsu Shōkōgun, 微熱症候群) (1997)
