= Groizer X =

Manga and anime series

- Title card

グロイザーX (Guroizā X)
- Genre: Mecha
- Created by: Go Nagai
- Manga
- Written by: Go Nagai
- Illustrated by: Panchosu Ishiwata
- Published by: Asahi Sonorama
- Magazine: Manga Shōnen
- Original run: June 1976 – September 1976
- Volumes: 2
- Anime television series
- Directed by: Hiroshi Taisenji
- Produced by: Kiyoshi Nishino; Norio Kondo
- Written by: Toyohiro Andō
- Studio: Knack Productions; Dynamic Productions
- Licensed by: NA: Discotek Media
- Original network: Tokyo Channel 12
- Original run: July 1, 1976 – March 31, 1977
- Episodes: 36
- Manga
- Written by: Go Nagai
- Illustrated by: Gosaku Ota
- Published by: Shogakukan
- Magazine: TV-kun
- Original run: August 1976 – February 1977
- Volumes: 2
- Manga
- Written by: Go Nagai
- Illustrated by: Shigeru Akimoto
- Published by: Shogakukan
- Magazine: Shogaku Ichinensei
- Original run: September 1976 – December 1976
- Volumes: 1

Groizer X (Japanese: グロイザーX, Hepburn: Guroizā X) is an anime series aired from 1976 to 1977. There were 36 episodes. It is also referred to as Gloyzer X and Gloizer X.

== Story ==
The Gaira aliens, hidden in the Arctic, plan to conquer Earth. Captured and forced to work for the aliens, Dr. Yan creates the ultimate weapon, a transformable aerial robot called Groizer X. Groizer X was 100 meters tall and weighed 1200 tons. Entrusted to his daughter Rita, Groizer X escapes the clutches of the Gaira and lands in Japan, where pilot Joe Kaisaka meets a wounded Rita. Taking up the controls of Groizer X, Jo and Rita fight against the Gaira invasion.

== Concept ==
The anime was created by Go Nagai and Gosaku Ota as a side project during the time they were busy with the various Mazinger series. Groizer X nevertheless managed to be converted into a TV series. The robot transforms into a jet, while the show included intense battle sequences and aerial combat, it remained a secondary super robot series.

== Characters ==
Grozier X

Japanese name	Voiced by
Joe Kaisaka	Tōru Furuya
Rita Yan	Kiiko Nozaki
Baku	Naoki Tatsuta
Jo	
Dottor Yanki	
Prof. Tobishima	Hisashi Katsuta
Ghelden Narratore	

== Merchandise ==
The original Groizer X toyline are one of the very few Super Robot toys produced by Nakajima Manufacturing Company instead of the industry dominant Popy.

Yamato then did a GN-U Groizer X figure released in 2007. A manga version of the figure was produced, only painted in green.

== Outside Japan ==
While not being a great success in Japan, Groizer X had a considerable impact in Brazil, where it was aired under the name O Pirata do Espaço ("The Space Pirate") in 1984/1986 at the Manchete Network. Only two 70's mecha anime were shown in the country up until that point, and Groizer X was the only one to air in its entirety (Voltes V, the other one, only aired for five episodes). In Latin America, the anime was aired under the name El Justiciero. In Italy it was one of the few robotic anime to be aired on Silvio Berlusconi's Canale 5, in 1981, where it failed to garner much following and was never replayed.

== References in other series ==
In the 2009 anime Mazinger Edition Z: The Impact!, Count Brocken deploys an updated Groizer, "Groizer X-10" to attack Mazinger Z and the Mazinger Corps. Later on, Groizer's X-9, X-11 and X-12 are also shown, used by the Count to sink the Submarine Fortress Saluud.
