= Astroganger =

Japanese anime television series

アストロガンガー
- Genre: Mecha
- Anime television series
- Directed by: Yoshikata Nitta
- Produced by: Katsumaro Saijo; Kensuke Fuji (NTV)
- Written by: Tatsuo Tamura
- Music by: Akihiro Komori
- Studio: Knack Productions
- Licensed by: NA: Discotek Media
- Original network: NNS (NTV)
- Original run: October 4, 1972 – March 28, 1973
- Episodes: 26

Astroganger (アストロガンガー, Astrogangā) is a Japanese super robot anime series created by Knack Productions. It consisted of 26 episodes and originally aired from October 4, 1972, to March 28, 1973.

== Plot ==
An alien woman named Maya crash-lands on Earth. Her homeworld was destroyed by the Blasters, a cruel alien race who steals the natural resources from other planets. She falls in love with a human scientist and gives birth to a hybrid boy named Kantaro. When the Blasters invade the Earth, Kantaro must defeat them by fighting with Ganger, a sentient robot made from living metal.

== Production ==
This was the first super robot show in color, beating Mazinger Z to the air by two months.

Ganger is different from most of the robots of the genre. He is a sentient being who can talk, think, and feel pain. He has no special abilities and must rely on his strength to win battles.

== Japanese cast ==
- Mie Azuma as Kantarō Hoshi
- Shōzō Iizuka as Ganger
- Hisayoshi Yoshizawa as Doctor Hoshi
- Kaoru Ozawa as Rie Hayakawa
- Hiroko Suzuki as Maya
- Teiji Ōmiya as Deputy Director Hayakawa
- Minoru Midorikawa as ISP Director
- Mikio Terashima as Blaster 1
- Taimei Suzuki as Blaster 2
- Motomu Kiyokawa as Blaster 3

== Staff ==
- Original Work: Tetsuhisa Suzukawa
- Series composition: Tatsuo Tamura
- Script: Tatsuo Tamura, Mitsuru Majima, Reiko Imano, Toyohiro Ando, Hiromichi Mogaki
- Storyboards: Taku Sugiyama, Masayuki Akehi
- Episode directors: Yoshikata Nitta, Kenjiro Yoshida
- Animation Director: Eiji Tanaka
- Character Design: Eiji Tanaka
- Art Director: Takamura Mukuo
- Music: Akihiro Komori
- Sound Director: Etsuji Yamada
- Supervision: Toshio Kobayashi
- Producer: Katsuma Saijō, Kensuke Fuji (NTV)
- Planning: Seiichi Nishino
- Animation Cooperation: Tama Production
- Production: Knack, Senkosha Productions

== Reception ==
Astroganger was very popular in the Middle East as Jonker (جونكر), and was also shown in Italy as Astroganga and in Spain as Astro Gungar.

The same staff would go on to create the notorious Chargeman Ken!. Like that show, Astroganger has sometimes been referred to as "so bad it's good."
