= Marine Boy =

Japanese anime television series

海底少年マリン (Kaitei Shōnen Marin)
- Genre: Adventure, science fiction
- Anime television series

Dolphin Prince
- Studio: Terebi Dōga
- Original network: Fuji TV
- Original run: April 4, 1965 – April 18, 1965
- Episodes: 3
- Anime television series

Hang On! Marine Kid
- Music by: Setsuo Tsukahara
- Studio: Terebi Doga
- Original network: TBS
- Original run: October 6, 1966 – December 29, 1966
- Episodes: 26 (only 13 aired)
- Anime television series

Undersea Boy Marine
- Music by: Setsuo Tsukahara
- Studio: Terebi Doga
- Licensed by: NA: Seven Arts Productions (formerly) Warner Bros.-Seven Arts Television (formerly) Warner Bros. Television Studios (currently)
- Original network: Fuji TV
- English network: AU: Nine Network, Network 10, 9Go!; HK: ATV World; NZ: NZBC; PH: TV5; UK: BBC; US: Syndication, MeTV Toons
- Original run: January 13, 1969 – July 27, 1970
- Episodes: 78
- Video game

CR Marine Boy
- Publisher: NewGin
- Genre: Pachinko
- Platform: Arcade
- Released: October 2006

Marine Boy is one of the first color anime to be shown in a dubbed form in the U.S., and later in Australia and the United Kingdom. It was originally produced in 1965 in Japan as Undersea Boy Marine (海底少年マリン, Kaitei Shōnen Marin) by Minoru Adachi and animation company Japan Tele-Cartoons. It was sold outside Japan via K. Fujita Associates Inc., with Warner Bros.-Seven Arts Television handling worldwide distribution of the English-language version. The series was distributed in syndication in the United States starting in 1966.

== Series ==
The series follows a gifted boy serving with the Ocean Patrol, an underwater policing agency that protects Earth's oceans. Set in a future where humanity has fully explored the seas, they host undersea ranches, mineral operations, research centres, and underwater communities.

The Ocean Patrol is a global maritime agency that defends all life beneath the waves. It combats criminal and military threats, using submarines, surface warships, and aircraft. Its scientific division, led by Dr. Mariner and Professor Fumble, develops advanced weapons, vehicles, and technologies, while its cvil divisions manage undersea farming, research, and industry.

The series centres on the patrol craft P-1, a compact submarine capable of brief flight via retractable wings. P-1 is heavily armed with "rocket torpedoes" and can mount heat beams, missiles, smoke screens, circular saws, sonic cannon, steel nets, power claws, drills, and lasers.

Marine Boy, aged 13–15, is skilled in martial arts, and can communicate with a white dolphin, Splasher, summoned via a whistle in his ring. His wetsuit, designed by Dr. Mariner and Professor Fumble, allows protection in hazardous missions, resisting penetration by bullets and extreme temperatures. His boots contain propeller packs, retractable flippers, and his helmet has a radio. He breathes underwater using "oxy-gum", and his main weapon is a folding alloy boomerang capable of cutting metal, deflecting bullets and delivering an electric charge.

== History ==
Terebi Dōga, also known as Japan Tele-Cartoons (JTC), produced a three-episode pilot series titled Dolphin Prince (ドルフィン王子, Dorufin Ōji), which was broadcast on Fuji TV from April 4 to April 18, 1965. It is unclear if these episodes were produced in color or black and white. The pilot was developed into a color series, Hang On! Marine Kid (がんばれ!マリンキッド, Ganbare! Marin Kiddo), which aired on TBS from October 6 to December 29, 1966, having 26 episodes produced with only 13 of them being aired on TBS before being cancelled.

Undersea Boy Marine (海底少年マリン, Kaitei Shōnen Marin) aired on Fuji TV from January 13 to July 22, 1969, after which the remaining episodes were broadcast from October 13, 1969 to July 27, 1970, for a total of 78 episodes. (Note: Some sources state that the series was canceled after 36 episodes on Fuji TV, but as mentioned above, all 78 episodes have been broadcast on Fuji TV.)

The international version, titled Marine Boy, was dubbed into English and syndicated in the United States by Warner Bros.-Seven Arts Television from late 1967, reorganizing the episodes for the English-speaking market.

== Main characters ==
=== Marine Boy ===
The teenage protagonist, Marine Boy is an exceptionally skilled swimmer, diver and martial artist who serves in the Ocean Patrol. His equipment, developed by his father, includes a red wetsuit with retractable flippers, jet boots and a radio headpiece, enabling underwater travel, rescue and combat.

=== Dr. Mariner ===
Marine Boy's father and the Ocean Patrol's chief scientist, he designs the specialised equipment Marine Boy uses, provides mission briefings and serves as the organisation's principal technical authority.

=== The Commander ===
The head of the Ocean Patrol enforces discipline and procedure, yet occasionally shows warmth and pride in Marine Boy's courage and resourcefulness.

=== Neptina (Neptuna) ===
A young mermaid ally who assists Marine Boy using her magic pearl and by communicating with sea creatures.

=== Splasher ===
Marine Boy's loyal white dolphin companion, central to many rescue sequences and missions.

=== Professor Fumble ===
An eccentric inventor whose devices alternately aid and complicate Ocean Patrol operations.

=== Bulton (Bolton) and Piper ===
Crew of the P-1 patrol boat, providing operational support, local knowledge and occasional comic relief.

=== Clicli (Cli-Cli) ===
A boy from an ancient underwater kingdom, cheerful and inquisitive, he assists Marine Boy in several episodes.

== Villains ==
Villains generally only appeared in one episode before being defeated. These adversaries include undersea pirates, rogue scientists, monstrous sea creatures, and power-hungry warlords, each posing a threat to Ocean Patrol. Unlike recurring villains in later animated series, most foes are eliminated or neutralised by the episode's conclusion, seldom returning or being mentioned again. This format created self-contained adventures in which good consistently triumphed, maintaining the show's moral tone and action-driven narrative.

== English characterization ==
The voice of Marine Boy, Neptina and Clicli was that of Corinne Orr, who was also the voice of Trixie and Spritle in Speed Racer. Jack Grimes, who also worked on Speed Racer, was the voice of Professor Fumble and Splasher. Peter Fernandez was the voice of Piper and Dr. Mariner. His other work includes The Space Giants, Ultraman, Star Blazers, many of the Godzilla films, as well as both Speed and Racer X from Speed Racer. Jack Curtis was the voice of Bullton, as well as the series' narrator (performing the same duties on Speed Racer).

== Episodes ==
Warner Bros.' 2009 syndication order

No.	Title
1	"The Green Monster"
Marine Boy, suspecting sabotage, investigates when an "unsinkable" nuclear ship is lost during a tornado.
2	"Danger at 300 Fathoms"
A great underwater oil field is discovered by Dr. Mariner, but while drilling, the team at Satellite Station 23 collapses and Marine Boy is sent to investigate. When he is attacked by strange seaweed, Marine Boy faints and falls unconscious to the ocean floor.
3	"Monsters of the Deep"
Marine Boy, Bullton and Piper are ordered to the fishing boat Whoppercatch to investigate an S.O.S. regarding a sea monster.
4	"Dangerous Starfish"
After arriving at the crash site of an unidentified aircraft, the P-1 witnesses an explosion and find themselves surrounded by huge, electronically controlled, poisonous starfish.
5	"The Astounding Shellfish"
Bullton and Piper find a missing fishing boat with no one aboard. Marine Boy and Splasher set out to solve the mystery of the crew's whereabouts. Marine Boy enters the fishing boat and meet a strange man, Professor Doomsday, who offers to show Marine Boy something amazing. As he turns, however, Doomsday hits the young hero hard on the head and Marine Boy is knocked unconscious. When he wakes up, Marine Boy is laid across a rock. He is suddenly attacked by a giant shellfish and, although he escapes, Marine Boy faints and heads toward some rocks. Splasher tries to find a way to save the unconscious Marine Boy.
6	"The Mysterious Paradise"
During an expedition organized by the Ocean Patrol, Dr. Mariner and his crew find a spear which is modeled after one known to be thousands of years old.
7	"Deepest of the Deep"
In order to provide more food to the people of the world, Dr. Mariner experiments with raising larger fish, but it is missing one ingredient, which can only be found in the deepest part of the ocean.
8	"The Ghost Ship"
Marine Boy, Bullton, and Piper are sent to the Arctic Ocean to search for 11 missing men and to explore the myth of a ghost ship.
9	"The Monstrous Seaweed"
Marine Boy answers an S.O.S. and finds no ship in the area of the signal. What he does find, however, is electronically controlled artificial seaweed.
10	"The Super Mystery Boat"
Marine Boy enters a kind of submarine Grand Prix using a special boat invented by Dr. Mariner and Professor Fumble, but the boat is blown up before the race is finished. Marine Boy is knocked unconscious in the explosion and, although he recover briefly when given oxygum, Marine Boy soon faints and is taken to the hospital. While in the hospital, an enemy agent drugs Marine Boy's medicine but he realizes it and escapes. Marine Boy returns to the crash site and follows a frogman into a cave, but it is a trap and the cave fills with knockout gas, causing Marine Boy to fall asleep. Neptina and Splasher have to save the unconscious Marine Boy.
11	"The Greatest Power on Earth"
A strange statue which contains vast treasure is discovered by tycoon Mr. Goldpocket while flying over it in his plane. When he investigates, Marine Boy is knocked unconscious and kidnapped.
12	"Disaster on the High Sea"
Mr. Smirch steals nuclear rock drills in order to obtain enough uranium to take over the oceans of the world.
13	"Secret of the Time Capsule"
A mysterious time capsule is found by Marine Boy and Splasher, who take it to Dr. Mariner.
14	"Mystery of the Missing Vessels"
Flim Flamboyant disguises his sub as the P-1 and leads ships to a cave, where he steals their precious cargo.
15	"Menace of the Missing Bomb"
A proton bomb with its safety catch unhooked is stolen by a secret agent.
16	"Danger in the Depths"
Splasher is caught in the sound waves emitted by Scorpo, who plans to sell the dolphins of the world to Smirkoland for use as robots.
17	"The Gigantic Sea Farm"
Marine Boy and Splasher stumble on an underwater farm, where plants grow quickly due to the rich soil.
18	"Terror of the Fire Ball"
Dr. Shinedor has invented an electronic laser beam which he can use to shock and punish man for hunting and fishing for pleasure.
19	"Empire of the Sea"
Despo Montebank, who claims to be the Emperor of the Pacific Empire, holds Marine Boy and his crew captive in an electromagnetic force field and tries to make them obey him.
20	"Battle to Save the World"
Marine Boy leaves the P-1 to search for the wreckage of a ship sunk by Captain Rex Rancid's electronic missiles.
21	"The Terrifying Icebergs"
Marine Boy and the P-1 are sent to investigate the disappearance of ships at the North Pole, apparently due to icebergs.
22	"The Whales of Destruction"
While testing the electronic fence at the Ocean Patrol underwater research ranch, Professor Fumble and Mr. Washer are captured and held on an invisible ship.
23	"The Power of Power"
Accidents continue to occur in an underwater power station which is under construction and Marine Boy discovers tremendous currents, which he feels are man-made.
24	"5 Billion In Diamonds"
Clicli sees a submarine attack a diamond-bearing ship and picks up the key after the captain of the ship throws it overboard to keep it from thieves.
25	"Mission at Corkscrew Strait"
In leading an important cargo ship through the narrow strait, the P-1 must use torpedoes to clear the way.
26	"Lighthouse of Terror"
A lighthouse beam changes course mysteriously and ships in the area are running aground as a result.
27	"The Invincible Force"
The P-1, along with Bullton and Piper, is reported missing and Marine Boy and Splasher go search for them, finding them in a cave being held prisoners of Hambone and Skwid.
28	"Riddle of the Vanishing Frogmen"
The villains X-3 and Professor Stormbrane are planning to set off a super bomb inside a volcano and send out Shell boats to attack the S.S. Rubadubdub.
29	"Panic in the Pacific"
Marine Boy and the P-1 encounter synthetic jelly monsters, which attack a secret airship whose torpedoes only make them multiply and grow larger.
30	"24 Hours to Doom"
Marine Boy and Dr. Mariner set up a trap to catch pirates who sink ships and steal the cargo. After Dr. Mariner is caught, the villains give the Ocean Patrol 24 hours to surrender their base in return for Dr. Mariner's freedom.
31	"Attack of the Robot Spiders"
Marine Boy and his racer, Carrier Fish, are trapped by robot spiders who spin webs and encircle them. Marine Boy uses his boomerang to allow Carrier Fish to escape but before he can follow, Marine Boy faints and is kidnapped.
32	"The Great Bomb Robbery"
Thieves capture Hugh Highstep, the ballet instructor, and the dolphin ballerina, Twinklefin, after the dolphin accidentally takes a miniature bomb that Squidink wants for himself.
33	"Operation Deep Deep"
Four wacky scientists kidnap Professor Fumble in an attempt to learn the formulas for the Ocean Patrol's many weapons, especially Marine Boy's special suit.
34	"The Stolen Island"
35	"Underwater Underworld"
A gangster group is holding a secret convention in an underwater strait and is being trained by Professor Beelzebub to steal an electronic brain which is being delivered to Ocean Patrol headquarters.
36	"Rustlers of the Deep"
Rustlers steal the whales from Texboy's deep sea ranch.
37	"Raid of the Robot Robbers"
Robots controlled by Mr. Fuddidudder are stealing from stores and ships and the Ocean Patrol thinks the Gold Grabber Gang is really the cause of the trouble.
38	"Attack of the Robot Sharks"
During an Ocean Patrol Rodeo, Bullton finds himself riding the back of a monster shark breathing fire and it is one of Count Shark's monsters for use in an attempt to take over Ocean Patrol headquarters.
39	"The Monster Search"
Marine Boy and the P-1 are sent by Dr. Mariner to capture a prehistoric sea monster. Along the way, they encounter a fortune teller and a gangster.
40	"The Well Hidden Plan"
Marine Boy and the P-1 set out to search for a microfilm, which has been hidden in a potato.
41	"Flimflam on the High Seas"
Professor Dazzle loses his dazzling pendant during his performance at the circus. When Bullton finds the pendant, Flip Flimflam's men kidnap him, thinking that he is Professor Dazzle.
42	"The Dragon of the Sea"
A sea dragon is wounded by a movie crew that is trying to film it. The Ocean Patrol is ordered to destroy it.
43	"Piracy Under the Sea!"
Marine Boy's wrist radio is removed by a playful baby dolphin and, as a result, he cannot hear Bullton and Piper's call for help.
44	"The Super Brain Caper"
Dr. Mum is captured on a submarine and forced by Mr. Robbinsteel to build an electronic brain. Marine Boy rescues Dr. Mum, the submarine is blown up, but the brain is still intact.
45	"The Great Underwater Train Robbery"
Jesse Jamison and his men take over a train, which is carrying a shipment of rubies, on the Underwater Railroad.
46	"The Genius Dolphin"
Professor Fumble invents a mini-electronic translator for Splasher to use in order to speak with humans.
47	"The Nuclear Pirates"
Two ships collide in a fog and the nuclear-powered ship is robbed of its nuclear fuel.
48	"The Phoney Patrolmen"
Men disguised as Ocean Patrol members enter an underground fort in an attempt to steal gold and all the persons in the fort are held captive by them.
49	"Saga of the Undersea Lion"
Captain Kiddo and his pirate ship discover a castle filled with treasure that is guarded by an undersea lion on the ocean floor.
50	"The Mini Micro Wave"
Clicli discovers a ship which sends out a roll of microfilm and shows it to Marine Boy. The film shows Miniprof's microwave machine that can shrink anything.
51	"The Ultra Freezer Freeze"
Jim Sumorbond tries to steal Professor Fumble's special ultra-freezer. The getaway truck crashes into the ocean and the ultra-freezer in the back causes huge icebergs to form.
52	"The Tubsub Tanker Sub"
A storm causes an oil tanker to spill oil in the sea, jeopardizing the sea life. Octane builds a spill-proof Tubsub Tanker Sub.
53	"The Tremendous Tremendo"
When the evil Despotic invents a super electronic brain called Tremendo, he plans world conquest. When he intervenes, Marine Boy is knocked unconscious and kidnapped.
54	"The Ghosts of Spook Island"
A supposedly haunted island is under the domination of the mysterious Captain Wraith.
55	"Ghost of Destruction"
Marine Boy faces the greatest challenge of his career in the Ocean Patrol when a ship, the ghost of a heavy cruiser, haunts the seas. Wherever it appears, a disaster follows.
56	"The Whale Blows Rainbows"
Guppy, an enormous pet whale, is kidnapped by Cuthbert Tuthsum, a butler with ambitions toward evil.
57	"The Great Plankton Menace"
Dr. Bulthrod's plane, carrying precious specimens of a rare plankton, is shot down. The plankton escapes into the sea, where it grows and threatens to engulf the entire Earth.
58	"Showdown at Sea"
When Professor Puddin builds his complex for extracting gold from sea water, the infamous Dr. Al Kemy devises an evil plan.
59	"The Precious Robot"
When Professor Fumble invents a robot that makes diamonds out of coal, the evil Mr. Carbona sees his chance to control the world's economy.
60	"Fight for the Rocket"
Professor Fumble's greatest invention, a weather observation rocket, is stolen by the notorious Lard Greedfat.
61	"Red Menace"
Suddenly, an army of red dolphins threatens the ocean depths. Their goal is the destruction of the Ocean Patrol.
62	"The Invincible Robots"
Professor Fumble invents a fabulous new robot, but evil forces build an army of robots.
63	"Island of Treasure"
When a mysterious treasure map falls into the hands of the Ocean Patrol, the crew of P-1 and Marine Boy sail for the Island of Treasure.
64	"Thieves of the Deep"
Flim Flamboyant schemes to become a billionaire by robbing the underwater oil pipeline.
65	"The Wild Monster Plant"
The ultrasonic voices of Splasher and his friends awaken a dangerous monster plant which has been sleeping for millions of years.
66	"The Vanishing Vessel"
A cruise ship carrying Professor Fumble and the world's greatest scientists disappears without a trace.
67	"Challenges of the Pirates"
The powerful pirate, Captain Kiddo, is challenged by the Queen of Pirates to see if he can defeat Marine Boy.
68	"Land of the Strange Vikings"
An Ocean Patrol boat is found with the crew missing. The search takes Marine Boy to a strange and forbidding land of ancient Vikings, where today they are living under the domination of a cruel queen.
69	"Attack of the Icebergs"
When huge mysterious icebergs appear in the tropical sea, the Ocean Patrol is alerted.
70	"The Deadly Tank"
Jocko Nape builds a tank equipped with a hyper-uranium bomb which he plans to set off in the middle of the ocean, thereby creating tidal waves big enough to destroy whole cities.
71	"Avenger of the Sea"
Captain Aquarius has captured some unusual sea creatures for his underwater zoo. In the deepest part of the ocean lives Zeoclode, avenger of the sea, who tries to rescue his friends.
72	"The Desperate Search"
Professor Ike Conoclast has perfected a secret formula for a new secret weapon, but when it is about to be stolen from him, he hides each half of the formula in a different place.
73	"The Secret of the Golden Seaweed"
When a castaway whom Marine Boy rescues tells him of a fabulous patch of golden seaweed, they set off together to find the fantastic plant.
74	"The Fantastic Flash"
Marine Boy is blinded temporarily by a flash of light, which a gang of criminals is using to escape detection of their crimes.
75	"The Stormy Brainstorm"
The Brainstorm, a super electronic computer, suddenly becomes so powerful that it can control not only other machines, but human minds as well.
76	"The Gill Men"
Piper is captured by the fiendish Dr. Diablo. Diablo plans to save mankind from a future flood by installing gills in their bodies so they can live underwater.
77	"The Great Sea Escape"
Two master criminals escape from an underwater prison farm and use the P-1 as their getaway boat with Bullton and Piper as hostages.
78	"The Desert Destroyer"
The desert is flooded with sea water and the Ocean Patrol believes that someone is illegally mining uranium beneath the desert.

== Home media release ==
Marine Boy has been restored and remastered from original elements for DVD release by the Warner Archive Collection. Season 1 was released on June 18, 2013. Seasons 2 and 3 were released on February 11 and July 2, 2014, respectively.

== See also ==
- Stingray
- SeaQuest DSV
- The Deep
