= Kinkyū Hasshin Saver Kids =

1991 Japanese anime television series

緊急発進セイバーキッズ (Kinkyū Hasshin Seibā Kizzu)
- Genre: SciFi, Adventure
- Created by: Monkey Punch
- Anime television series
- Directed by: Hajime Kamegaki
- Produced by: Mitsuo Shimizu; Akira Noguchi; Masakatsu Kozuru; Mikihiro Iwata
- Music by: Michiaki Katō; Hiromoto Tobisawa
- Studio: Tokyo Movie Shinsha
- Original network: TXN (TV Tokyo)
- Original run: February 19, 1991 – February 11, 1992
- Episodes: 50

Kinkyū Hasshin Saver Kids (緊急発進セイバーキッズ, Kinkyū Hasshin Seibā Kizzu; lit. Emergency Takeoff Saver Kids), also known as The Rescue Kids, is a science fiction anime series originally created by Lupin the Third creator Monkey Punch. Produced by TV Tokyo, Sotsu Agency and Tokyo Movie Shinsha, it was directed by Hajime Kamegaki, with Osamu Nabeshima designing the characters, Studio Ox designing the mechanical elements, Yasuo Ōtsuka serving as mechanical supervisor and Michiaki Katō and Hiromoto Tobisawa composing the music. The series aired for 47 episodes and 3 recap episodes on TV Tokyo affiliate networks from February 19, 1991, to February 11, 1992.

== Plot ==
In the not-too-distant future, people are living in peace thanks to the benefits of highly developed robot technology. However, the Scrap Squad led by Dr. Bug begins to wreak havoc on the Earth. The company that stands up to crush his ambitions is the Pukarin Company, a long-established robot development and rental company run by the Tenjinbayashi family. The "Saver Kids," a rescue team made up of children, gets in the way of Dr. Bug's plans.

== Characters ==
Gou Tenjinbayashi (天神林 ゴウ, Tenjinbayashi Gō)
Voiced by: Mami Matsui
The youngest and second son. He is pilot of the Sky Saver. Though he acts a bit saucy, he loves inventing things, and works as an assistant to his grandfather Matsugorou.
Ken Tenjinbayashi (天神林 ケン, Tenjinbayashi Ken)
Voiced by: Wataru Takagi
The eldest son. He is primary pilot of the Carrier Saver. He is a strong-willed and kind brother, but has a tendency to be a bit absent-minded. He is in charge of sales at the Pukarin Company. Whether it's by coincidence with the original creator and staff or not, his appearance and body shape resembles that of Arsène Lupin III himself (Lupin III also makes a guest appearance once in the series).
Ran Tenjinbayashi (天神林 ラン, Tenjinbayashi Ran)
Voiced by: Wakana Yamazaki
The eldest daughter who was born after Ken. She is co-pilot of the Carrier Saver and pilot of the Ran Saver. She is a manly woman and is good at karate. She has a good figure and is often made a pass on by Gou and Matsugorou. This role is Wakana Yamazaki's debut work.
Matsugorou Tenjinbayashi (天神林 松五郎, Tenjinbayashi Matsugorō)
Voiced by: Takkō Ishimori
The grandfather of Gou, Ken and Ran. He is founder of the Pukarin Company and a famous scientist, though he is a bit childish for his age and has a fondness for women. He is in charge of the development of robots and has developed each Saver. He sometimes flies out with the Carrier Saver.
Takeo Tenjinbayashi (天神林 竹男, Tenjinbayashi Takeo)
Voiced by: Kazumi Tanaka
The father of Gou, Ken and Ran. He is owner of the Pukarin Company. His wife, Umeko, holds dominance over him, but he is also the commander of the Saver Kids, though the company's management doesn't seem to be doing very well.
Umeko Tenjinbayashi (天神林 梅子, Tenjinbayashi Umeko)
Voiced by: Sanae Takagi
The mother of Gou, Ken and Ran. She is a strong person and the leader of the Tenjinbayashi family. She is a calm and gentle mother, but is scary when she loses her temper. She also works in sales with Ken.
Dr. Bug (Dr.バグ, Dr. Bagu)
Voiced by: Kaneta Kimotsuki
The villain of the series who keeps conspiring to bring destruction and chaos to the Earth, but is always stopped at the last minute by the Saver Kids. He is dressed like a German soldier during World War II, and hides his head under a steel helmet with four vacuum tubes plugged into it. His personality is brutal and he loves destruction and chaos, but he is troubled by the fact that Omega and Epsilon always mess up. Originally, he was a peace-loving, brilliant scientist, but an incident changed his personality.
Omega (オメガ) and Epsilon (イプシロン, Ipushiron)
Voiced by: Ginzō Matsuo (Omega), Ken Yamaguchi (Epsilon)
The members of the Scrap Squad, though there are only three of them, including Dr. Bug. The silver, fat robot is Omega while the tall, golden robot is Epsilon. They are always complaining about the failures being forced upon them. Despite their raggedy appearance, they are actually very strong. Both characters eventually reappeared in another anime directed by Hajime Kamegaki, Sonic X, as Doctor Eggman's subordinates Bocoe (Omega) and Decoe (Epsilon), with the same voice actor being cast for Bocoe and Decoe.
