= Don Chuck Monogatari =

Japanese anime TV series

- Screenshot of the series depicting the main characters

ドン・チャック物語 (Don Chakku Monogatari)
- Anime television series
- Directed by: Kazuyuki Okaseko; Kouzo Takagaki
- Produced by: Hiromichi Mogaki
- Written by: Susumu Yoshida; Toyohiro Andô; Yoshiaki Yoshida
- Music by: Hiroshi Yamazaki
- Studio: Knack Productions
- Original network: Tokyo Channel 12
- Original run: 5 April 1975 – 27 September 1975
- Episodes: 26

Don Chuck Monogatari (ドン・チャック物語, Don Chakku Monogatari; lit. Don Chuck Story) is a Japanese anime television series consisting of 26 episodes. It was followed by Shin Don Chuck Monogatari. It was directed by Kazuyuki Okaseko and Kouzo Takagaki and first broadcast on Tokyo Channel 12 in April 1975. Don Chuck is the name of the mascot character for Tokyo Dome City Attractions (formerly Korakuen Amusement Park and Korakuen Stadium). The series contains profound lessons in courage, patience, loyalty, and other human values.

== Plot ==
Don Chuck with his father Don Aristotle, are beavers who live at the house on small island in the river, that flows through the heart of Zawazawa Forest. Chuck's father worries about his motherless son, who is especially concerned about his growth, but the mischievous Chuck lives a carefree life with many friends, including Lara, a playful beaver girl, Mimi the rabbit, and Daigo the little bear. Through his interactions with his friends and his father, and his adventures in the forest, Chuck gradually grows up.
