= Manga Sarutobi Sasuke =

Japanese anime television series

- Cover art from volume 4 of the DVD release

まんが猿飛佐助
- Anime television series
- Directed by: Shohei Tojo
- Produced by: Katsuma Saijo; Norio Kondo; Seiichi Nishino (Executive Producer)
- Written by: Hitoshi Mizuno; Takeshi Shudo; Toyohiro Andô; Tsunehisa Ito; Yuji Amemiya
- Music by: Jyunkou Mizuno; Yuichi Oshima
- Studio: Knack Productions
- Licensed by: NA: Jim Terry Productions, Paramount Home Video (Expired)
- Original network: Tokyo Channel 12
- Original run: October 9, 1979 – April 29, 1980
- Episodes: 24

Manga Sarutobi Sasuke (まんが猿飛佐助) is a 24-episode anime series about the young Sarutobi Sasuke, a legendary ninja. It was first aired from October 9, 1979, to April 29, 1980, on Tokyo Channel 12 (now TV Tokyo), and was later dubbed in several languages. The whole 24-episode run was aired in many European and Arabic countries.

It is best known to the American fans as Ninja, The Wonder Boy: a highly edited, highly condensed feature-length version of this series. This version, dubbed in English, was produced by Jim Terry Productions of Force Five fame. The names of several characters were changed, with Sarutobi Sasuke becoming "Duke Hayakawa", his female companion Sakura being changed to "Blossom", and the villain Devilman became "Dragon".

== Plot ==
Set in feudal Japan during the Sengoku period, the story follows a young and highly skilled ninja named Sasuke, who serves under the famous warlord Sanada Yukimura.

Sasuke is a mischievous and courageous boy with remarkable agility and the ability to summon animals to aid him in battle. His journey is filled with exciting adventures, as he thwarts the plans of evil warlords and protects his master from enemy ninjas and rival factions. Along the way, Sasuke grows as both a warrior and a leader, using his wit, training, and compassion to overcome numerous challenges.

While the series is largely lighthearted, it incorporates traditional ninja skills, folklore, and historical elements, blending action, comedy, and ninja fantasy.

== See also ==
- Shōnen Sarutobi Sasuke (Magic Boy)
