= 1981 in animation =

Events in 1981 in animation.

== Events ==
=== February ===
- February 13: Ralph Bakshi's American Pop is first released.

=== March ===
- March 31: 53rd Academy Awards: Ferenc Rófusz' The Fly wins the Academy Award for Best Animated Short.

=== April ===
- April 8: The first episode of Dr. Slump - Arale-chan, an adaptation of the Dr. Slump manga by Akira Toriyama, is broadcast.
- April 28: The Peanuts TV special It's Magic, Charlie Brown premieres on CBS.

=== July ===
- July 10: Ted Berman, Richard Rich and Art Stevens' The Fox and the Hound, produced by the Walt Disney Company, is first released.

=== August ===
- August 7: Gerald Potterton's Heavy Metal premieres and becomes a cult classic.

=== September ===
- September 12: The first episode of The Smurfs, produced by Hanna-Barbera, based on Belgian comics artist Peyo's eponymous comic series, is broadcast. This Saturday morning adaptation becomes a cult favorite years later.
- September 14: The first episode of Willo the Wisp is broadcast.
- September 16: The first episode of Postman Pat is broadcast.
- September 28: The first episode of Danger Mouse is broadcast.

=== October ===
- October 14: The first episode of Urusei Yatsura is broadcast.
- October 30: The Peanuts TV special Someday You'll Find Her, Charlie Brown premieres on CBS, which was not well-favored for having a new character substituting the Little Red-Haired Girl, who's been a long-time crush for Charlie Brown. This is Grant Wehr's only voicing credit as he failed to reprise his role for the subsequent Peanuts cartoons due to his voice was reportedly too coarse for Charlie Brown.

=== November ===
- November 20: Friz Freleng's anthological Looney Tunes film The Looney Looney Looney Bugs Bunny Movie premiered in theaters.

=== December ===
- December 25: Stig Lasseby and Jan Gissberg's Peter-No-Tail is first released.

=== Specific date unknown ===
- The first Disney on Ice shows are organized.

== Films released ==
- January 1 - The Mystery of the Third Planet (Soviet Union)
- January 3:
  - The Call of the Wild: Howl, Buck (Japan)
  - Kaitei Daisensō: Ai no 20,000 Miles (Japan)
- January 5 - 3000 Leagues in Search of Mother (South Korea)
- February 7 - Run Melos! (Japan)
- February 13 - American Pop (United States)
- March 14:
  - Doraemon: The Record of Nobita, Spaceblazer (Japan)
  - The Fantastic Adventures of Unico (Japan)
  - Kaibutsu-kun: Kaibutsu Land e no Shoutai (Japan)
  - Mobile Suit Gundam I (Japan)
  - Swan Lake (Japan)
- March 20 - Natsu e no Tobira (Japan)
- April 11:
  - Chie the Brat (Japan)
  - Furiten-kun (Japan)
- April 26 - The Donbee Story (Japan)
- May 5:
  - Helen Keller Monogatari: Ai to Hikari no Tenshi (Japan)
  - Lupin tai Holmes (Japan)
- June 8 - Sugata Sanshiro (Japan)
- June 23 - Around the World with Dot (Australia)
- July 4 - Tomorrow's Joe 2 (Japan)
- July 9:
  - Blizkata Dalechina (Bulgaria)
  - Grendel Grendel Grendel (Australia)
- July 10 - The Fox and the Hound (United States)
- July 11 - Mobile Suit Gundam II: Soldiers of Sorrow (Japan)
- July 16 - Old Master Q (Hong Kong)
- July 18:
  - Captain (Japan)
  - Sonyeon 007 Jihajeguk (South Korea)
  - The Sea Prince and the Fire Child (Japan)
- July 21 - Enchanted Journey (Japan)
- July 22 - Gugugui taeyang seongung isunsin (South Korea)
- July 27 - Frankenstein (Japan)
- August 1:
  - 21 Emon: Uchū e Irasshai! (Japan)
  - Adieu Galaxy Express 999 (Japan)
- August 7:
  - Gongnyong Baengmannyeon Ttori (South Korea)
  - Heavy Metal (Canada)
- August 9:
  - Robot King (South Korea)
  - Yuki (Japan)
- August 16 - Anime-ban Toukaidou Yotsuya Kaidan (Japan)
- August 23:
  - Bremen 4: Angels in Hell (Japan)
  - Kabo-Encho no Dobutsuen Nikki (Japan)
- October 3 - Bokura Mangaka: Tokiwa-sou Monogatari (Japan)
- October 7 - Rennyo and His Mother (Japan)
- October 22 - Son of the White Mare (Hungary)
- November 20 - The Looney Looney Looney Bugs Bunny Movie (United States)
- November 28:
  - Manga Hana no Kakarichō (Japan)
  - Manzai Taikouki (Japan)
- December 10 - The Little Fox (Hungary)
- December 20 - Minoïe (France)
- December 21 - Maria, Mirabela (Romania and Soviet Union)
- December 22 - Chiisana Love Letter: Mariko to Nemunoki no Kodomo-tachi (Japan)
- December 25 - Peter-No-Tail (Sweden)
- December 26 - Shunmao Monogatari Taotao (Japan)
- December 29 - Space Warrior Baldios (Japan)
- Specific date unknown - Renshenguo (China)

== Television series ==
- January 4 - The Swiss Family Robinson: Flone of the Mysterious Island debuts on Fuji TV.
- January 31 - Saikyo Robo Daiohja debuts in syndication.
- February 7 - Yattodetaman debuts on Fuji TV.
- February 10 - Pigeon Street debuts on BBC.
- March 1 - Golden Warrior Gold Lightan debuts on Tokyo 12 TV.
- March 4 - Beast King GoLion debuts on Tokyo Channel 12.
- March 6 - Hello! Sandybell debuts on TV Asahi.
- March 7 - Ohayo Spank debuts in syndication.
- April 3 - Ai no Gakko Cuore Monogatari debuts on Mainichi Broadcasting System.
- April 7:
  - Belle and Sebastian debuts on NHK.
  - Little Women debuts on Tokyo Channel 12.
- April 8 - Dr. Slump & Arale-chan debuts on Fuji TV.
- April 16 - Queen Millennia debuts on Fuji TV.
- April 20 - Tiger Mask II debuts on TV Asahi.
- July 3 - GoShogun debuts on Tokyo Channel 12.
- September 3 - Manga Mito Komo debuts on TV Tokyo.
- September 12:
  - Goldie Gold and Action Jack debuts on ABC.
  - Astro and the Space Mutts, Space Stars, Spider-Man and His Amazing Friends, Teen Force, The Smurfs, and The Kid Super Power Hour with Shazam! debut on NBC.
  - Blackstar, The Kwicky Koala Show, The New Adventures of Zorro, and Trollkins debut on CBS.
  - Marmaduke and Spider-Man debut in syndication.
- September 14 - Willow the Wisp debuts on BBC1.
- September 16 - Postman Pat debuts on BBC1.
- September 28:
  - Danger Mouse debuts on ITV.
  - Ninja Hattori-kun debuts on TV Asahi.
- October 1 - Superbook debuts on TV Tokyo, CBN, and Australian Christian Channel.
- October 2 - Six God Combination Godmars debuts on NNS (Nippon TV).
- October 3:
  - Chie the Brat debuts on MBS.
  - Hero High debuts on NBC.
- October 4 - Dash Kappei debuts on Fuji TV.
- October 6 - Braiger debuts on TV Tokyo.
- October 7 - Honey Honey debuts on Fuji TV.
- October 8 - Miss Machiko debuts on TV Tokyo.
- October 9 - Dogtanian and the Three Muskehounds debuts on MBS and TVE.
- October 10:
  - Laverne & Shirley in the Army debuts on ABC.
  - Ulysses 31 debuts on FR3 and Nagoya Broadcasting Network.
- October 14 - Urusei Yatsura debuts on Fuji TV.
- October 23 - Fang of the Sun Dougram debuts on TV Tokyo.

== Births ==
=== January ===
- January 1: Eden Riegel, American actress (voice of Yuna in Stitch!, Kiara in The Lion Guard, Boscha in The Owl House, Gwen in Knights of Guinevere, young Miriam in The Prince of Egypt, Kōan in the Viz Media dub of Sailor Moon, Rurichiyō Kasumiōji in Bleach), and voice director (Disney Television Animation).
- January 15: Pitbull, American musician and businessman (voice of Bufo in Epic, Ugly Dog in UglyDolls).
- January 24: Carrie Coon, American actress (voice of Michelle's Mother in the Teenage Euthanasia episode "Viva La Flappanista", Proxima Midnight in the What If...? episode "What If... T'Challa Became a Star-Lord?").
- January 25: Alicia Keys, American singer, songwriter and actress (voice of Boinga's Mom in The Backyardigans episode "Mission to Mars", herself in The Proud Family episode "The Good, the Bad, and the Ugly").
- January 28: Elijah Wood, American actor (voice of Tom Thumb in The Adventures of Tom Thumb and Thumbelina, Mumble in Happy Feet and Happy Feet Two, 9 in 9, Sone in The Wind Rises, Beck in Tron: Uprising, Wirt in Over the Garden Wall, Jace Rucklin in Star Wars Resistance, himself in the Family Guy episode "Brian Griffin's House of Payne").
- January 30: Ron Holsey, American television writer (Johnny Test, Curious George, Martha Speaks, My Friends Tigger & Pooh, Arthur, Winx Club, Miles from Tomorrowland, Hanazuki: Full of Treasures, Elena of Avalor, Rusty Rivets, Nina's World, Pinkalicious & Peterrific, If You Give a Mouse a Cookie, The Stinky & Dirty Show, T.O.T.S., Nella the Princess Knight, Sesame Street).
- January 31: Justin Timberlake, American musician and actor (voice of Arthur Pendragon in Shrek the Third, Boo-Boo Bear in Yogi Bear, Branch in the Trolls franchise, himself in The Simpsons episode "New Kids on the Blecch").

=== February ===
- February 1:
  - John Gemberling, American actor and comedian (voice of Doofus Drake in DuckTales, Blastus in Robotomy, Tyler in Big Mouth, Russell in The Great North).
  - Alison Viktorin, American retired voice actress (voice of Conan Edogawa in Case Closed).
- February 3: Alisa Reyes, American actress (voice of LaCienega Boulevardez in The Proud Family franchise).
- February 5: Adassa, American urban reggaeton singer and songwriter (voice of Dolores Madrigal in Encanto).
- February 8: Dawn Olivieri, American actress (voice of Pepper Potts in The Avengers: Earth's Mightiest Heroes).
- February 9: Tom Hiddleston, English actor (voice of Captain Hook in The Pirate Fairy, Lord Nooth in Early Man, Loki in What If...? and The Simpsons shorts "The Good, the Bart, and the Loki" and "Welcome to the Club", Seuss Narrator and Killer Robot #1 in the Robot Chicken episode "Butchered in Burbank", Statue Griffin in the Family Guy episode "No Country Club for Old Men", Kanjigar in the Trollhunters: Tales of Arcadia episode "Becoming").
- February 10:
  - Stephanie Beatriz, American actress (voice of Mirabel Madrigal in Encanto, Gosalyn Waddlemeyer in DuckTales, General Sweet Mayhem in The Lego Movie 2: The Second Part, Kate Kane in Catwoman: Hunted, Gertie in Ice Age: Collision Course, Vaggi in Hazbin Hotel).
  - Uzo Aduba, American actress (voice of Bismuth in Steven Universe, Queen Novo in My Little Pony: The Movie, Alicia Hawthorne in Lightyear, Colonel Kubritz in 3Below: Tales of Arcadia).
- February 12: Lisa Hannigan, Irish musician (voice of Blue Diamond in the Steven Universe franchise, Bronagh in Song of the Sea).
- February 17: Joseph Gordon-Levitt, American actor and filmmaker (voice of Jim Hawkins in Treasure Planet, Jiro Horikoshi in The Wind Rises, Professor Luxcraft in Wolfboy and the Everything Factory, Jiminy Cricket in Pinocchio).
- February 23: Josh Gad, American actor (voice of Olaf in the Frozen franchise the Sofia the First episode "The Secret Library: Olaf and the Tale of Miss Nettle" ans Once Upon a Studio, Chuck in The Angry Birds Movie and The Angry Birds Movie 2, Louis in Ice Age: Continental Drift, Mondo in Good Vibes, Birdie in Central Park, Art in the American Dad! episode "Pulling Double Booty", LT-319 in the Star Wars Rebels episode "Double Agent Droid").
- February 27: Josh Groban, American singer, songwriter, and actor (performed "Believe" in The Polar Express, voice of Bill in the Robot Chicken episode "Catch Me If You Kangaroo Jack", Olivier Scenechuer in the Niko and the Sword of Light episode "The Thorn of Contention", Professor Frink's singing voice in The Simpsons episode "I'm Just a Girl Who Can't Say D'oh", himself in the American Dad! episode "News Glance with Genevieve Vavance").

=== March ===
- March 2:
  - Danielle Moné Truitt, American actress (voice of Georgia in The Princess and the Frog).
  - Amos Crawley, Canadian voice actor (voice of Owl in Little Bear, Simon in Girlstuff/Boystuff, Moose in Franklin, Alexander in Babar, Petey and Eddie in Tales from the Cryptkeeper, Arnold in The Magic School Bus (season 1), Russell in Stickin' Around, Martin the Warrior in Redwall).
- March 8: Justin Wright, American animator (Pixar), (d. 2008).
- March 29: Megan Hilty, American actress (voice of Rosetta in the Disney Fairies franchise, Wammawink in Centaurworld, JD in Robot and Monster, Frances Alberta in The Penguins of Madagascar episode "The Hokoben Surprise").
- March 30: Katy Mixon, American actress and model (voice of Barb in Big Hero 6: The Series, Tina Nelson in Minions, Seraphina in the Rapunzel's Tangled Adventure episode "There's Something About Hook Foot", Petunia Pig in The Looney Tunes Show episode "Mr. Weiner", Mary Jane Watson in the Robot Chicken episode "Major League of Extraordinary Gentlemen").

=== April ===
- April 11: Matt Ryan, Welsh actor (voice of John Constantine in the DC Animated Movie Universe, Constantine: City of Demons, and the Harley Quinn episode "It's a Swamp Thing").
- April 24: Nicole Bouma, Canadian actress (voice of Mint Blancmanche in Galaxy Angel, Snooky Wookums in Krypto the Superdog, Blossom in Powerpuff Girls Z, Nena Trinity in Mobile Suit Gundam 00, Rain Shine in the My Little Pony: Friendship Is Magic episode "Sounds of Silence").

=== May ===
- May 11: J. P. Karliak, American actor and comedian (voice of Kouzou Fuyutsuki in the Netflix dub of Neon Genesis Evangelion, Ted Templeton in The Boss Baby: Back in Business, Tin Man in Dorothy and the Wizard of Oz, Wile E. Coyote in New Looney Tunes, Dante Crescendo in Trolls: TrollsTopia, Green Goblin in Spidey and His Amazing Friends, Reese in Batman: The Killing Joke, Willy Wonka in Tom and Jerry: Willy Wonka and the Chocolate Factory, Linus in The Stinky & Dirty Show, Doc Samson in the Hulk and the Agents of S.M.A.S.H. episode "The Skaar Whisperer").
- May 12: Rami Malek, American actor (voice of Tahno in The Legend of Korra, Flip McVicker in BoJack Horseman).
- May 19: Jonas Poher Rasmussen, Danish filmmaker (Flee).
- May 23: Tim Robinson, American comedian, actor, writer, and producer (voice of Ugly Sonic in Chip 'n Dale: Rescue Rangers, Fraptaculan Tim in Aqua Teen Forever: Plantasm, Brett Kavanaugh in Our Cartoon President, Gregly in Big City Greens).
- May 28: Laura Bailey, American voice actress (voice of Tohru Honda in Fruits Basket, Lust in Fullmetal Alchemist, young Trunks in Dragon Ball Z, the title character in Crayon Shin-chan, Keiko Yulimara in Yu Yu Hakasho, Sana Kurata in Kodacha, Ayaka Yukihiro and Evangeline A.K. McDowell in Negima!, Maka Albarn in Soul Eater, Emily / Glitter Lucky in Glitter Force, Firestar in The Super Hero Squad Show, Gamora in Avengers Assemble, Black Widow in Avengers Assemble and Ultimate Spider-Man, Gwen Stacy in Spider-Man).

=== June ===
- June 1:
  - Johnny Pemberton, American actor (voice of Peanut in Pickle and Peanut, Dr. Eigerman in the Bob's Burgers episode "The Kids Run the Restaurant", Braco in the Adventure Time episode "The Suitor").
  - Amy Schumer, American actress and comedian (voice of Velvet in Trolls Band Together, Irving Jannings in the BoJack Horseman episode "Chickens", Mrs. Burns in The Simpsons episode "Monty Burns' Fleeing Circus").
- June 4: T.J. Miller, American actor and comedian (voice of Fred in Big Hero 6, Tuffnut Thorston in the How to Train Your Dragon franchise, Gene in The Emoji Movie, Robbie Valentino in Gravity Falls).
- June 8: Ai Nonaka, Japanese actress (voice of Beauty in Bobobo-bo Bo-bobo, Kyoko Sakura in Puella Magi Madoka Magica, Japanese dub voice of Connie Maheswaran in Steven Universe).
- June 9: Natalie Portman, Israeli-born American actress (voice of Darcy in The Simpsons, Jane Foster in the What If...? episode "What If... Thor Were an Only Child?", Whale Documentary Narrator in the Bluey episode "Whale Watching").
- June 13: Chris Evans, American actor (voice of Buzz Lightyear in Lightyear, Casey Jones in TMNT, Stewart Stanton in Battle for Terra, Human Torch, Gobo Fraggle, Teacher and Pilot in Robot Chicken).
- June 19: Robin McLeavy, Australian actress (voice of Nutsy in Blinky Bill the Movie).
- June 22:
  - Monty Oum, American animator, animation director and actor (Rooster Teeth, Red vs. Blue), (d. 2015).
  - Porsha Williams, American television personality, actress, and author (voice of Carlotta in CarGo, Christine in the Zootopia+ episode "The Little Rodents of Little Rodentia").
- June 30: Matt Danner, American animator (Spümcø), storyboard artist (The Ripping Friends, Warner Bros. Animation, Gravity Falls, Wander Over Yonder), character designer (Xiaolin Showdown, Johnny Test), background artist (Gravity Falls), sheet timer (Coconut Fred's Fruit Salad Island), director (Xiaolin Showdown, The Drinky Crow Show, Dan Vs., The Looney Tunes Show, Team Hot Wheels), producer (Legend of the Three Caballeros, Muppet Babies) and voice actor (voice of various characters in Legend of the Three Caballeros, Kermit the Frog, Beaker, Waldolf, Rowlf the Dog and Swedish Chef in Muppet Babies).

=== July ===
- July 13: Clé Bennett, Canadian actor (voice of Chef Hatchet, Beardo and Leonard in the Total Drama franchise, Earl Devereaux in Cloudy with a Chance of Meatballs).
- July 24: Summer Glau, American actress (voice of Supergirl in Superman/Batman: Apocalypse).
- July 29: Emily Bauer, American actress (voice of Dawn and Cynthia in Pokémon, Megumi Morisato in Ah! My Goddess).

=== August ===
- August 1: Ashley Parker Angel, American musician, actor and member of O-Town (voice of Danny Star in Handy Manny, himself in the Clone High episode "Plane Crazy: Gate Expectations").
- August 3: Travis Willingham, American actor (voice of Roy Mustang in Fullmetal Alchemist, Knuckles the Echidna in the Sonic the Hedgehog franchise, Portgas D. Ace in the Funimation dub of One Piece, Thor in Ultimate Spider-Man, Avengers Assemble, Hulk and the Agents of S.M.A.S.H., Guardians of the Galaxy, and Spider-Man, Hulk and Human Torch in The Super Hero Squad Show, King Roland in Sofia the First, Tim Buktu, Kraab, Sydney, and Cannonbolt in Ben 10, Zartan in Billy Dilley's Super-Duper Subterranean Summer, Grog Strongjaw in The Legend of Vox Machina).
- August 27: Sugar Lyn Beard, Canadian actress (voice of Chibiusa in Sailor Moon, Creech in Cyberchase, Nancy in Harry and His Bucket Full of Dinosaurs).

=== September ===
- September 4: Beyoncé Knowles, American musician and actress (voice of Shine in Wow! Wow! Wubbzy!: Wubb Idol, Queen Tara in Epic, Nala in The Lion King).
- September 7: Athena Karkanis, Canadian actress (voice of Aviva Corcovado in Wild Kratts, Opaline in My Little Pony: Make Your Mark).
- September 8: Jonathan Taylor Thomas, American actor and director (voice of young Simba in The Lion King, the title character in The Adventures of Pinocchio, Shoukichi in Pom Poko, Tangie in The Tangerine Bear, Spot in The Adventures of Spot, Scarecrow Jr. in The Oz Kids, Tyler Tucker in The Wild Thornberrys, George in Itsy Bitsy Spider, Luke Stetson in The Simpsons episode "Dude, Where's My Ranch?").
- September 15: Ben Schwartz, American actor (voice of the title characters in Randy Cunningham: 9th Grade Ninja and the Sonic the Hedgehog films, Dewey in DuckTales, Leonardo in Rise of the Teenage Mutant Ninja Turtles, Lou in M.O.D.O.K.).
- September 22: Ashley Eckstein, American actress (voice of Ahsoka Tano in the Star Wars franchise, Mia in Sofia the First, Dagger and Shriek in Ultimate Spider-Man, Lady Elanna in Avengers Assemble, Cheetah in DC Super Hero Girls, Yaeko Okajima in Only Yesterday, Tallstar in the She-Ra and the Princesses of Power episode "Stranded", Bailey in The Replacements episode "Glee by the Sea").
- September 26:
  - Yao Beina, Chinese actress, comedian, singer, and songwriter (pop version of Let It Go), (d. 2015).
  - Serena Williams, American former professional tennis player (voice of Yoga Yvette in PAW Patrol: The Mighty Movie, Athena in the Loonatics Unleashed episode "Apocalypso", Snowplow Driver Hero in the Higglytown Heroes episode "Eubie's Turbo Sled", Ming in the Avatar: The Last Airbender episode "The Day of Black Sun", Sage in The Legend of Korra episode "Beginnings", herself in The Simpsons episode "Tennis the Menace").
- September 29:
  - Kelly McCreary, American actress (voice of Dot in Harvey Girls Forever!).
  - Scott McAfee, American actor (voice of Willie Watt in Batman Beyond, Louis in the Freakazoid! episode "Fatman and Boy Blubber", first voice of Littlefoot in The Land Before Time franchise).

=== October ===
- October 9: Eddie White, Australian writer and director (The Cat Piano).
- October 17: Cameron Esposito, American actress and comedian (voice of Ranger Tabes in We Bare Bears, Carroll in Adventure Time, Winnie in the We Baby Bears episode "Polly's New Crew").
- October 31: Ali Kazmi, Pakistani-Canadian actor, director and producer (voice of Cousin, Fruit Seller and Market Voices in The Breadwinner).

=== November ===
- November 1: Matt Jones, American actor (voice of Drip in Planes: Fire & Rescue, Kyle in Home and Home: Adventures with Tip & Oh, Gunther Magnuson in Kick Buttowski: Suburban Daredevil, Lenz in Tron: Uprising, Humpty Dumpty in Beware the Batman, Hector Flanagan in Sanjay and Craig, Pig in Pig Goat Banana Cricket, Percy in Amphibia, Dave Grant-Gomez in Hamster & Gretel, Zack in the Wallykazam! episode "Dawn of the Zucchini").
- November 8: Azura Skye, American actress (voice of Veronica and Cookie in American Dad!, Deanna Clay in the Batman Beyond episode "Inqueling").
- November 16: Caitlin Glass, American actress (voice of Winry Rockbell in Fullmetal Alchemist, Haruhi Fujioka in Ouran High School Host Club, Nefertari Vivi in One Piece, Evergreen in Fairy Tail, Mina Ashido in My Hero Academia, Vados in Dragon Ball Super, Petra Rall in Attack on Titan, Hitomi Kanzaki in The Vision of Escaflowne, Maki Nishikino in Love Live! School Idol Project, Saki Nikaido in Zombie Land Saga, Damian Desmond in Spy × Family).
- November 18: Nasim Pedrad, American actress and comedian (voice of Zia Zanna in Star Wars: Young Jedi Adventures, Jillian in Despicable Me 2, Once-Ler's Mother in The Lorax).
- November 23: John Lavelle, American actor and playwright (voice of Mouse Foreman in Zootopia, Puck, Liam and Janitor Bob in Kipo and the Age of Wonderbeasts, Peekablue in the She-Ra and the Princesses of Power episode "Perils of Peekablue", additional voices in Frozen and Ralph Breaks the Internet).
- November 29: Bun Hay Mean, French comedian and actor (French dub voice of Doanld Moderate in One Piece: Stampede), (d. 2025).

=== December ===
- December 1:
  - Annemarie Brown, American animator (King of the Hill) and storyboard artist (Family Guy).
  - Kathryn Drysdale, English actress (voice of Bounce and Merri in Bottersnikes and Gumbles, Jemima "JJ" Jones in Dennis & Gnasher: Unleashed!, Kate in the Thunderbirds Are Go episode "Grandma Tourismo").
- December 2:
  - Britney Spears, American singer, songwriter and dancer (voice of Donner in Hooves of Fire and Robbie the Reindeer in Legend of the Lost Tribe, herself in The Simpsons episode "The Mansion Family").
  - Lesley-Ann Brandt, South African actress (voice of Liza in Captain Fall).
- December 3: Liza Lapira, American actress (voice of Disgust in Inside Out 2).
- December 14: Matthew A. Cherry, American film director, writer and producer (Hair Love).
- December 16: Krysten Ritter, American actress and model (voice of Dana Polk in the Robot Chicken episode "Immortal", Gina in The Cleveland Show episode "California Dreamin (All The Cleves are Brown)", Shelia Redfield in The Simpsons episode "Meat Is Murder").
- December 25: Ant Blades, English cartoonist and animator (creator of It's Pony).

=== Specific date unknown ===
- Angel Oquendo, American actor (voice of Bobby Swift in Cars 3).
- Jan Rogowski, British technical director and producer (co-founder of Red Star 3D), (d. 2022).
- Hyun Min Lee, Korean-American animator (Christmas Is Here Again, The Mr. Men Show, Walt Disney Animation Studios, Amphibia).
- Michał Socha, Polish animator and filmmaker (Chick, Loop, Room, animated the couch gags for The Simpsons episodes "Orange Is the New Yellow" and "The Incredible Lightness of Being a Baby").

== Deaths ==
=== January ===
- January 18: Manuel Perez, Mexican-American animator and director (Warner Bros. Cartoons, Bill Melendez Productions, DePatie-Freleng, Hanna-Barbera, Fritz the Cat), dies at age 66.

=== February ===
- February 12: Lev Atamanov, Armenian-Russian animator and film director (The Scarlet Flower, The Snow Queen, The Key), dies at age 75.
- February 20: Bernard B. Brown, American film composer and sound engineer (composer for Warner Bros. Cartoons, head of the sound department at Universal Studios), dies at age 82.
- February 22: Michael Maltese, American screenwriter (Warner Bros. Cartoons, Hanna-Barbera) and comics writer, dies at age 73 from cancer.

=== March ===
- March 16: Bill Baucom, American actor (voice of Trusty in Lady and the Tramp), dies at age 70.
- March 26: Hal Adelquist, American animator, animation producer and storyboard writer (Walt Disney Company), dies at age 66.
- Specific date unknown: Richard Loederer, American comics writer, comics artist and animation art director (worked for Amedee J. Van Beuren), dies at age 86 or 87.

=== April ===
- April 8: Eric Rogers, English composer, conductor and arranger (DePatie-Freleng Enterprises), dies at age 59.
- April 16: Bernice Hansen, American voice actress (voice of Tillie Tiger in Elmer Elephant, Petunia Pig, Cookie and Little Kitty in the Looney Tunes franchise, continued voice of Andy Panda and Oswald the Lucky Rabbit, provided squeaks for Mickey Mouse), dies at age 83.
- April 23: Vivie Risto, American animator and comics artist (Walt Disney Company, Warner Bros Cartoons, Hanna-Barbera), dies at age 78.
- April 24: Howard Purcell, American comics artist, writer and animator, dies at age 62.

=== June ===
- June 4: Ray Abrams, American animator and director (Walt Disney Company, Metro-Goldwyn-Mayer cartoon studio, Walter Lantz Productions, Hanna-Barbera), dies at age 75.
- June 19: Lotte Reiniger, German film director and animator, pioneer of silhouette animation (The Adventures of Prince Achmed the oldest surviving feature-length animated film, and devised an early version of the multiplane camera), dies at age 82.
- June 21: Don Figlozzi, American animator and cartoonist, pioneer in television animation (Fleischer Studios, Walt Disney Animation Studios, Terrytoons), dies at age 72.

=== July ===
- July 3: Ross Martin, American actor (voice of Punchy for Hawaiian Punch, Andy Svenson in The Man from Button Willow, Dr. Paul Williams in Sealab 2020, Agent 000 in The Robonic Stooges), dies at age 61.
- July 4: Stephen Bosustow, Canadian-American animator (Ub Iwerks, Walter Lantz Productions, Walt Disney Animation Studios) and film producer (UPA, Gerald McBoing Boing, Mr. Magoo, Bosustow Entertainment, Sesame Street), dies at age 69.

=== October ===
- October 3: Claire Parker, American engineer (inventor of the Pinscreen) and animator, dies at age 75.
- October 15: Frank de Kova, American actor (voice of Angie in Heavy Traffic, Managan in Coonskin and Old Vinnie in Hey Good Lookin'), dies at age 71.
- October 22: Little Ann Little, American singer and actress (continued voice of Betty Boop), dies at age 71.

=== November ===
- November 12: Ralph Heimdahl, American animator and comics artist (Walt Disney Company, made comics based on Bugs Bunny), dies at age 72.
- November 25: Jack Albertson, American actor, comedian and singer (voice of Amos Slade in The Fox and the Hound), dies at age 74.

=== December ===
- December 27: Hoagy Carmichael, American musician, composer, songwriter, actor and lawyer (voiced himself in The Flintstones episode "The Hit Song Writers"), dies at age 82.

== See also ==
- 1981 in anime
