= 1981 in anime =

The following events occurred in the field of anime in the year 1981.

== Accolades ==
- Ōfuji Noburō Award: Gauche the Cellist

== Releases ==
Released	Title	Type	Studio	Director	Notes	Ref
January 4	The Swiss Family Robinson: Flone of the Mysterious Island	TV series	Nippon Animation	Yoshio Kuroda		
February 7	Hashire Melos!	Film	Toei Animation	Tomoharu Katsumata		
February 7	Yattodetaman	TV series	Tatsunoko Productions	Hiroshi Sasagawa		
March 1	Golden Warrior Gold Lightan	TV series	Tatsunoko Production	Koichi Mashimo		
March 4	Beast King GoLion	TV series	Toei Animation	Katsuhito Taguchi		
March 6	Hello! Sandybell	TV series	Toei Animation	Hiroshi Shitara		
March 7	Ohayō! Spank	TV series	TMS Entertainment	Shigetsugu Yoshida		
March 14	Doraemon: The Records of Nobita, Spaceblazer	Film	Shin-Ei Animation	Hideo Nishimaki		
March 14	The Fantastic Adventures of Unico	TV series	Madhouse	Toshio Hirata		
March 14	Mobile Suit Gundam	Film	Nippon Sunrise	Yoshiyuki Tomino		
March 14	Ojamanga Yamada-kun	Short film	Nihon Herald Pictures	Hiromitsu Furukawa		
March 14	Swan Lake	Film	Toei Animation	Kimio Yabuki		
March 20	Natsu e no Tobira	Film	Toei Animation, Madhouse	Mamoru Masaki, Toshio Hirata		
April 3	Ai no Gakko Cuore Monogatari	TV series	Nippon Animation	Eiji Okabe		
April 4	Dotakon	TV series	Kokusai Eiga-sha	Takeshi Shirato		
April 7	Belle and Sebastian	TV series	MK Company, Visual 80, Toho Company, Ltd.	Keiji Hayakawa		
April 7	Little Women	TV series	Toei Animation, Kokusai Eiga-sha	Kazuya Miyazaki		
April 8	Dr. Slump - Arale-chan	TV series	Toei Animation	Minoru Okazaki		
April 11	Furiten-kun	Film	Toho	Taku Sugiyama		
April 11	Jarinko Chie	Film	Tokyo Movie Shinsha, Toho	Isao Takahata		
April 16	Queen Millennia	TV series	Toei Animation	Nobutaka Nishizawa		
April 20	Tiger Mask II	TV series	Toei Animation	Kozo Morishita		
July 3	GoShogun	TV series	Ashi Productions, Studio Z5	Kunihiko Yuyama		
July 4	Ashita no Joe 2	Film	Tokyo Movie Shinsha	Osamu Dezaki		
July 11	Mobile Suit Gundam II: Soldiers of Sorrow	Film	Nippon Sunrise	Yoshiyuki Tomino		
July 18	Dr. Slump and Arale-chan: Hello! Wonder Island	Short film	Toei Animation	Minoru Okazaki		
July 18	The Sea Prince and the Fire Child	Film	Sanrio			
July 21	Enchanted Journey	Film	Studio Korumi	Hideo Nishimaki		
July 27	Kyoufu Densetsu Kaiki! Frankenstein	TV film	Toei Animation	Kentaro Haneda		
August 1	Adieu Galaxy Express 999	Film	Toei Animation	Rintaro		
September 7	New Dokonjō Gaeru	TV series	Tokyo Movie Shinsha	Tadao Nagahama		
September 28	Ninja Hattori-kun	TV series	Shin-Ei Animation	Fumio Ikeno, Hiroshi Sasagawa		
October 1	Superbook	TV series	Tatsunoko Productions	Masakazu Higuchi		
October 2	Six God Combination Godmars	TV series	Tokyo Movie Shinsha	Tetsuo Imazawa		
October 3	Jarinko Chie	TV series	Tokyo Movie Shinsha	Isao Takahata		
October 4	Dash Kappei	TV series	Tatsunoko Production	Masayuki Hayashi, Seitaro Hara		
October 6	Galaxy Cyclone Braiger	TV series	Kokusai Eiga-sha	Takao Yotsuji		
October 7	Honey Honey no Suteki na Bouken	TV series	Kokusai Eiga-sha, Toei Animation	Takeshi Shirato		
October 8	Miss Machiko	TV series	Studio Pierrot	Masami Anno		
October 9	Dogtanian and the Three Muskehounds	TV series	BRB Internacional, Nippon Animation			
October 10	Ulysses 31	TV series	DIC Audiovisuel, Tokyo Movie Shinsha			
October 14	Urusei Yatsura	TV series	Studio Pierrot, Studio Deen	Mamoru Oshii, Kazuo Yamazaki		
October 23	Fang of the Sun Dougram	TV series	Nippon Sunrise	Ryosuke Takahashi		
December 26	Shunmao Monogatari Taotao	Film				
December 29	Space Warrior Baldios	Film	Toei Animation			
	Daicon III	Short film		Hiroyuki Yamaga		

== See also ==
- 1981 in animation
