= List of animated feature films of 1981 =

This is a list of animated feature films first released in 1981.

== List ==
Title	Country	Director	Production company	Animation technique	Format	Notes	Release date	Duration
21 Emon: Uchū e Irasshai! 21エモン 宇宙へいらっしゃい！ (21 Emon: Welcome to Space!)	Japan	Tsutomu Shibayama	Toho; Shin-Ei Animation	Traditional	Theatrical		August 1, 1981	92 minutes
3000 Leagues in Search of Mother 엄마 찾아 삼천리 (Eomma chaja sammalli)	South Korea	Jeong Su-yong; Gang Han-yeong	Sunwoo Production Co., Ltd. Sidus	Traditional	Theatrical	Fourth and final installment of the Dreamland Cartoon Theater series; Unauthorized reanimated remake of 3000 Leagues in Search of Mother (1980).	January 5, 1981	78 minutes
Adieu Galaxy Express 999 さよなら銀河鉄道999 －アンドロメダ終着駅－ (Sayonara Ginga Tetsudo 999: Andromeda Shuchakueki)	Japan	Rintaro	Toei Animation	Traditional	Theatrical		August 1, 1981	130 minutes
American Pop	United States	Ralph Bakshi	Columbia Pictures; Bakshi Productions, Inc.	Traditional	Theatrical		February 13, 1981	96 minutes
Anime-ban Toukaidou Yotsuya Kaidan アニメ版 東海道 四谷怪談	Japan	Ryuji Sawada; Yasuo Otsuka		Traditional	Television film		August 16, 1981	46 minutes
Around the World with Dot a. k. a. Dot & Santa Claus	Australia	Yoram Gross	Yoram Gross Studios	Traditional/Live action	Theatrical		June 23, 1981	80 minutes
Blizkata Dalechina; Близката Далечина (The Nearby Distance)	Bulgaria	Slav Bakalov	Boyana Film	Traditional		First animated Bulgarian feature.	July 9, 1981	65 minutes
Bokura Mangaka: Tokiwa-sou Monogatari ぼくらマンガ家 トキワ荘物語 (Our Manga Artists: The Story of Tokiwa-so)	Japan	Atsutoshi Umezawa; Kazumi Fukushima; Shinichi Suzuki	Toei Animation; Fuji TV	Traditional	Television film	Fifteenth animated special produced for Fuji TV's "Nissei Family Special" program.	October 3, 1981	72 minutes
Bremen 4: Angels in Hell ブレーメン4 地獄の中の天使たち (Bremen 4: Jigoku no Naka no Tenshi-tachi)	Japan	Hiroshi Sasagawa; Osamu Tezuka	Tezuka Productions; Nippon TV	Traditional	Television film	Fourth animated special produced for Nippon TV's 24 Hour TV "Love Saves the Earth" telethon.	August 23, 1981	90 minutes
The Call of the Wild: Howl, Buck 荒野の叫び声 吠えろバック (Kōya no Sakebigoe: Hoero Bakku)	Japan	Kozo Morishita	Toei Animation	Traditional	Television film	Tenth animated special produced for Fuji TV's "Nissei Family Special" program.	January 3, 1981	85 minutes
Captain キャプテン (Kyaputen)	Japan	Satoshi Dezaki	Eiken	Traditional	Theatrical		July 18, 1981	95 minutes
Chie the Brat じゃリン子チエ (Jarinko Chie)	Japan	Isao Takahata	Tokyo Movie Shinsha	Traditional	Theatrical		April 11, 1981	110 minutes
Chiisana Love Letter: Mariko to Nemunoki no Kodomo-tachi 小さなラブレター まり子とねむの木の子供たち (A Little Love Letter: Mariko and the Children of the Silk Tree)	Japan	Yuzo Ishida	TV Asahi; NOW Planning	Traditional	Television film	Fictionalisation of the life story of Mariko Miyagi (March 21, 1927 – March 21, 2020), a Japanese singer, actress and advocate who founded a school for disabled children, the Kusunoki Gakuen.	December 22, 1981	1 hour, 24 minutes
The Donbee Story ムツゴロウの動物日記 どんべえ物語 (Mutsugorō no Dōbutsu Nikki Donbē Monogatari)	Japan	Bonjin Nagaki	Eiken; Nippon TV	Traditional	Television special	Fictionalisation based on the life of Masanori Hata (born April 17, 1935) and one of the animals his family kept, a brown bear named Donbee.	April 26, 1981	84 minutes
Doraemon: The Record of Nobita, Spaceblazer ドラえもん のび太の宇宙開拓史 (Doraemon Nobita no Uchū Kaitakushi)	Japan	Hideo Nishimaki	Toho; Shin-Ei Animation	Traditional	Theatrical		March 14, 1981	90 minutes
Enchanted Journey グリックの冒険 (Gurikku no Bōken)	Japan	Hideo Nishimaki	Studio Korumi	Traditional	Theatrical		July 21, 1981	85 minutes
The Fantastic Adventures of Unico ユニコ (Yuniko)	Japan	Toshio Hirata	Sanrio; Madhouse	Traditional	Theatrical		March 14, 1981	90 minutes
The Fox and the Hound	United States	Ted Berman; Richard Rich; Art Stevens	Walt Disney Productions	Traditional	Theatrical		July 10, 1981	83 minutes
Frankenstein 恐怖伝説 怪奇！フランケンシュタイン (Kyōfu Densetsu: Kaiki! Furankenshutain)	Japan	Yugo Serikawa; Toyoo Ashida	Toei Animation; TV Asahi	Traditional	Television film		July 27, 1981	98 minutes
Furiten-kun フリテンくん	Japan	Takashi Sugiyama	Toho; Knack Productions; Oh! Production	Traditional	Theatrical		April 11, 1981	78 minutes
Gongnyong Baengmannyeon Ttori 공룡 100만년 똘이 (Dinosaur One Million Years Ddoli)	South Korea	Kim Cheong-gi	Namyang Planning	Traditional	Theatrical		August 7, 1981	75 minutes
Grendel Grendel Grendel	Australia	Alexander Stitt	Victorian Film	Traditional	Theatrical		July 9, 1981	88 minutes
Gugugui taeyang seongung isunsin 구국의 태양 성웅 이순신 (Sun-Shin Yi, the Sun of Salvation)	South Korea	Kim Seong-chil	Hana Film; Namyang Planning	Traditional	Theatrical		July 22, 1981	71 minutes
Heavy Metal	Canada	Gerald Potterton	Columbia Pictures; Guardian Trust Company; Canadian Film Development Corporation; Famous Players; Potterton Productions; Atkinson Film-Arts	Traditional	Theatrical		August 7, 1981	90 minutes
Helen Keller Monogatari: Ai to Hikari no Tenshi ヘレン·ケラー物語 愛と光の天使 (The Story of Helen Keller: The Angel of Love and Light)	Japan	Fumio Ikeno	TV Asahi; NOW Planning	Traditional	Television film		May 5, 1981	81 minutes
Kabo-Encho no Dobutsuen Nikki カバ園長の動物園日記 (The Kaba Garden Director's Zoo Diary)	Japan	Masayuki Akehi	Toei Animation; Fuji TV	Traditional	Television film	Fourteenth animated special produced for Fuji TV's "Nissei Family Special" program.	August 23, 1981	67 minutes
Kaibutsu-kun: Kaibutsu Land e no Shoutai 怪物くん 怪物ランドへの招待 (Kaibutsu-kun: Invitation to Kaibutsu Land)	Japan	Hiroshi Fukutomi	Toho; Shin-Ei Animation	Traditional	Theatrical		March 14, 1981	75 minutes
Kaitei Daisensō: Ai no 20,000 Miles 海底大戦争 愛の20,000マイル (The Great Navy War: 20,000 Miles of Love)	Japan	Ippei Kuri	Tatsunoko Production; Nippon TV	Traditional	Television film		January 3, 1981	75 minutes
The Little Fox; Vuk	Hungary	Attila Dargay	Pannónia Filmstúdió	Traditional	Theatrical		December 10, 1981	76 minutes
The Looney Looney Looney Bugs Bunny Movie	United States	Friz Freleng	Warner Bros. Animation	Traditional	Theatrical	Film compiled from theatrical animated shorts; third of six Looney Tunes compilation feature films	November 20, 1981	79 minutes
Lupin tai Holmes ルパン対ホームズ (Lupin vs. Holmes)	Japan	Masayuki Akehi	Toei Animation; Fuji TV	Traditional	Television film	Twelfth animated special produced for Fuji TV's "Nissei Family Special" program.	May 5, 1981	68 minutes
Manga Hana no Kakarichō まんが花の係長 (The Happy Section Chief)	Japan	Noboru Ishiguro; Minoru Okazaki	Shochiku; Tokyo Movie Shinsha	Traditional	Theatrical		November 28, 1981	60 minutes
Manzai Taikouki マンザイ太閤記	Japan	Ryuji Sawada; Hideo Takayashiki	Shochiku; Tokyo Movie Shinsha	Traditional	Theatrical		November 28, 1981	100 minutes
Maria, Mirabela a. k. a. The Magical Forest; Мария, Мирабела (Mariya, Mirabela)	Romania; Soviet Union	Ion Popescu-Gopo; Natalia Bodyul	Moldova-Film; Soyuzmultfilm; Casa de Filme 5	Traditional/Live action	Theatrical		December 21, 1981	68 minutes
Minoïe	France	Jean Jabely; Philippe Landrot	Dovidis; Antenne-2; Les Productions du Tigre; Marubeni	Traditional	Theatrical		December 20, 1981	80 minutes
The Great Muppet Caper	United States	Jim Henson	Henson Associates	Puppetry	Theatrical		26 June 1981	97 minutes
Mobile Suit Gundam I 機動戦士ガンダムI (Kidō Senshi Gandamu I)	Japan	Yoshiyuki Tomino	Nippon Sunrise	Traditional	Theatrical	Film compiled from TV series episodes	March 14, 1981	139 minutes
Mobile Suit Gundam II: Soldiers of Sorrow 機動戦士ガンダムII 哀・戦士編 (Kidô Senshi Gandamu II: Ai Senshihen)	Japan	Yoshiyuki Tomino	Nippon Sunrise	Traditional	Theatrical	Film compiled from TV series episodes	July 11, 1981	133 minutes
Mister Giants Glory Number 3 ミスター・ジャイアンツ 栄光の背番号3 (Mister Giants Eikō no Sebangō 3)	Japan	Tameo Kohanawa; Hiromichi Horikawa (chief director)	Nippon TV; Toho Eizo Co. Tsuchida Production	Traditional	Television special	Fictionalisation of the life of Shigeo Nagashima (born February 20, 1936), a Japanese former professional baseball player and manager.	March 1, 1981	71 minutes
The Mystery of the Third Planet a. k. a. The Secret of the Third Planet; Тайна третьей планеты (Tayna tretyey planety)	Soviet Union	Roman Kachanov	Soyuzmultfilm	Traditional	Theatrical		January 1, 1981	50 minutes
Natsu e no Tobira 夏への扉 (The Door into Summer)	Japan	Mamoru Masaki; Toshio Hirata	Toei Animation; Madhouse	Traditional	Theatrical		March 20, 1981	59 minutes
Old Master Q 七彩卡通老夫子 (Qi cai ka tong Lao Fu Zi)	Hong Kong	Xie Jintu; Cai Zhizhong; Hu Shuru	Hong Kong Film Company; Far East Cartoon Company	Traditional	Theatrical	First Hong Kong animated feature.	July 16, 1981	80 minutes
Peter-No-Tail; Pelle Svanslös	Sweden	Stig Lasseby; Jan Gissberg	Sandrews; Svenska Filminstitutet; Teamfilm AS; Treklövern	Traditional	Theatrical		December 25, 1981	81 minutes
Rennyo and His Mother 蓮如とその母 (Rennyo to Sono Haha)	Japan	Kihachirō Kawamoto	"Rennyo and His Mother" Movie Production Promotion Committee	Stop motion/Puppet	Theatrical		October 7, 1981	93 minutes
Renshenguo 人参果 (Ginseng Fruit)	China	Yan Dingxian	Shanghai Fine Arts Film Studio	Traditional	Theatrical			45 minutes
Robot King 로보트킹	South Korea	Bae Yeong-lang	Sun Production	Traditional	Theatrical		August 9, 1981	67 minutes
Run Melos! 走れメロス (Hashire Melos!)	Japan	Tomoharu Katsumata	Toei Animation	Traditional	Television film	Eleventh animated special produced for Fuji TV's "Nissei Family Special" program.	February 7, 1981	68 minutes
The Sea Prince and the Fire Child a. k. a. The Legend of Syrius シリウスの伝説 (Shiriusu no Densetsu)	Japan	Masami Hata	Nippon Herald Films; Sanrio	Traditional	Theatrical		July 18, 1981	108 minutes
Shunmao Monogatari Taotao シュンマオ物語 タオタオ (The Story of Taotao the Panda)	Japan	Yoji Yamada	Shochiku; Shun Mao Production Committee; Tianjin City Craft and Art Design Institute	Traditional	Theatrical		December 26, 1981	90 minutes
Son of the White Mare; Fehérlófia	Hungary	Marcell Jankovics	Pannónia Filmstúdió	Traditional	Theatrical		October 22, 1981	90 minutes
Sonyeon 007 Jihajeguk 소년 007 지하제국 (Boy 007 Underground Empire)	South Korea	Jeong Su-yong; Kim Cheol-jong	Geumyong Film Studio	Traditional	Theatrical		July 18, 1981	75 minutes
Space Warrior Baldios 宇宙戦士 バルディオス (Uchū Senshi Barudiosu)	Japan	Kazuyuki Hirokawa	Production Reed	Traditional	Theatrical		December 29, 1981	117 minutes
Sugata Sanshiro 姿三四郎	Japan	Yasumi Mikamoto	Tokyo Movie Shinsha	Traditional	Television film	Thirteenth animated special produced for Fuji TV's "Nissei Family Special" program.	June 8, 1981	72 minutes
Swan Lake 世界名作童話 白鳥の湖 (Sekai Meisaku Dōwa: Hakuchō no Mizuumi)	Japan; Soviet Union	Kimio Yabuki	Toei Animation; Soyuzmultfilm	Traditional	Theatrical	Fourth film in the anthology film series Sekai Meisaku Dōwa (lit. "World Masterpiece Fairy Tales"); Co-production with Soyuzmultfilm.	March 14, 1981	75 minutes
Tomorrow's Joe 2 あしたのジョー (Ashita no Jō 2)	Japan	Osamu Dezaki	Nippon Herald Films; Tokyo Movie Shinsha	Traditional	Theatrical	Film compiled from TV series episodes	July 4, 1981	152 minutes
Toshishun 杜子春 (Toshiharu)	Japan	Takeichi Saito	TBS; DAX International Inc.	Traditional	Television special	Based on the 1920 short story of the same title by Ryūnosuke Akutagawa.	April 12, 1981	73 minutes
Yuki ゆき	Japan	Tadashi Imai	Nikkatsu Children's Movie; Mushi Production	Traditional	Theatrical		August 9, 1981	89 minutes

== See also ==
- List of animated television series of 1981
