= List of animated television series of 1981 =

A list of animated television series first aired in 1981.

Animated television series first aired in 1981
Title	Episodes	Country	Year	Notes	Technique
Ai no Gakko Cuore Monogatari	26	Japan	1981		Anime
Astro and the Space Mutts	11	United States	1981	Space Stars segment	Traditional
Beast King GoLion	52	Japan	1981–82	Adapted into Lion Force Voltron (United States, 1984)	Anime
Belle and Sebastian	52	Japan	1981–82		Anime
Blackstar	13	United States	1981		Traditional
Cocoshaker	21	France	1981		Traditional
Danger Mouse (1981)	89	United Kingdom	1981–92		Traditional
Dash Kappei	65	Japan	1981–82		Anime
Dixie	7	Poland	1981–82		Traditional
Dogtanian and the Three Muskehounds	26	Japan; Spain	1981–82		Traditional
Dotakon	28	Japan	1981		Anime
Dr. Slump & Arale-chan	243	Japan	1981–86		Anime
Fang of the Sun Dougram	75	Japan	1981–83		Anime
Galaxy Cyclone Braiger	39	Japan	1981–82		Anime
Golden Warrior Gold Lightan	52	Japan	1981–82		Anime
Goldie Gold and Action Jack	13	United States	1981		Traditional
Gorgeous Gosha	10	Soviet Union	1981-85		Traditional
GoShogun	26	Japan	1981		Anime
The Gutsy Frog 2	30	Japan	1981–82		Anime
Hello! Sandybell	47	Japan	1981–82		Anime
Hero High	26	United States	1981–82	Aired as part of The Kid Super Power Hour with Shazam!	Traditional
Honey Honey	29	Japan	1981–82		Anime
Jarinko Chie	64	Japan	1981–83		Anime
The Kid Super Power Hour with Shazam!	38	United States	1981–82		Traditional
The Kwicky Koala Show	16	United States	1981		Traditional
Laverne & Shirley in the Army	13	United States	1981–82	Spin-off of Laverne & Shirley	Traditional
Little Women	26	Japan	1981		Anime
Manga Mito Kōmon	46	Japan	1981–82		Anime
Marmaduke	13	United States	1981	Segment of Heathcliff and Marmaduke	Traditional
Miss Machiko	95	Japan	1981–83		Anime
The New Adventures of Zorro	13	United States	1981		Traditional
Ninja Hattori-kun	694	Japan	1981–87		Anime
Ohayō! Spank	63	Japan	1981–82		Anime
Pigeon Street	13	United Kingdom	1981		Cut-Outs
Postman Pat	184	United Kingdom	1981–2017		Stop-Motion
Queen Millennia	42	Japan	1981–82		Anime
Shazam!	13	United States	1981	Aired as part of The Kid Super Power Hour with Shazam!	Traditional
Six God Combination Godmars	64	Japan	1981–82		Anime
The Smurfs	256	United States; Belgium	1981–89		Traditional
Space Stars	11	United States	1981–82	Featured new episodes of Space Ghost and The Herculoids.	Traditional
Spider-Man	26	United States	1981–82		Traditional
Spider-Man and His Amazing Friends	24	United States	1981–83		Traditional
Superbook	26	Japan	1981–82		Anime
The Swiss Family Robinson: Flone of the Mysterious Island	50	Japan	1981		Anime
Teen Force	11	United States	1981	Space Stars segment	Traditional
Tiger Mask II	33	Japan	1981–82		Anime
Tilt	52	France	1981		Traditional
Trollkins	13	US	1981		Traditional
Ulysses 31	26	France; Japan	1981–82		Traditional
Urusei Yatsura	195	Japan	1981–86		Anime
Willo the Wisp (1981)	26	United Kingdom	1981		Traditional
Yattodetaman	52	Japan	1981–82		Anime

== See also ==
- List of animated feature films of 1981
- List of Japanese animation television series of 1981
