= Perce Pearce =

American producer, director, and writer (1899–1955)

- Born: September 7, 1899; Waukegan, Illinois, U.S.
- Died: July 4, 1955 (aged 55); London, England
- Occupations: Writer, director, producer, cartoonist
- Years active: 1916–1955
- Spouse: June Herrig Swan (m. 1930)
- Children: 2
- Relatives: Stanley Kramer (former-son-in-law)

Percival C. Pearce (September 7, 1899 – July 4, 1955) was an American producer, director, and writer, best known for his work with Walt Disney Productions.

== Early life ==
Born on September 7, 1899, in Waukegan, Illinois, Pearce was the son of English immigrants. His paternal grandfather had apprenticed as a druggist in Essex and moved to Waukegan around 1859. His father, Percival Pearce (Sr.), worked as a physicist while his aunt Winnifred worked as an artist. Pearce had two older siblings, a brother Stamford, and sister Isabel, and a younger sister named Margaret. At the age of ten, he started drawing, and when he was a high school freshman, his drawings had caught the attention of cartoonist J. Campbell Cory. While attending high school, Pearce pursued a career as a cartoonist. Following his graduation in 1918, he attended the Academy of Fine Arts in Chicago.

== Career ==
When World War I was declared, Pearce was working as a cartoonist for The Chicago Herald and the Publicity Feature Bureau. He was briefly enlisted for naval service, but shortly after, he was asked to do a daily comic strip for the Great Lakes Bulletin, a military newspaper serving the Naval Station Great Lakes. Pearce then submitted his idea for "Seaman Si", which was approved by Captain William A. Moffett. The strip told of the eponymous sailor who constantly gets into trouble. The series was later published as a softcover in 1917, and reprinted as a book a year later. At the same time, Pearce did editorial cartoons and political caricatures for his news agency, some of which were published in the New York Evening Post. In 1919, Pearce moved to Colorado to work as a cartoonist for The Denver Post.

On February 18, 1935, Pearce began working with Walt Disney Productions. There, he was initially employed as an inbetweener, but by the end of the year, he was involved in the writing for Snow White and the Seven Dwarfs (1937). By October 1936, he was promoted as sequence director, where he was tasked to guide the animators in developing the dwarfs' personalities. According to author John Grant, Pearce additionally served as live-action reference for some of the dwarfs, most particularly for Doc. For Fantasia (1940), Walt Disney assigned Pearce as animation director on the segment "The Sorcerer's Apprentice", with Carl Fallberg assisting him on story. However, in January 1938, Pearce and Fallberg were reassigned to work on Bambi (1942).

For Bambi, Pearce, along with Larry Morey, was tasked to supervise the story team, in which he developed the characters' personalities as he did on Snow White. According to Ollie Johnston and Frank Thomas, Pearce "loved to act out the roles of the animals in the film. In the morning, it was the owl ... Later, it might be the little mole who popped up out his burrow at Bambi's line". He also provided the voice for the mole. Afterwards, Pearce was involved in story direction for Victory Through Air Power (1943) and worked on the unproduced Gremlins project. By the mid-1940s, Pearce had become an assistant producer on Song of the South (1946) and So Dear to My Heart (1948). In November 1946, after the Atlanta premiere of Song of the South, Pearce traveled with Disney, his wife Lillian, and screenwriter John Tucker Battle to Ireland to research material for a potential film about leprechauns. The resulting project became Darby O'Gill and the Little People (1959).

To support their film industry, the United Kingdom impounded box office receipts earned by American studios, insisting the monies be spent there. Because the studio relied heavily on foreign markets, Disney established a film production studio in England so he could access the blocked funds. There, Disney selected Robert Louis Stevenson's Treasure Island as his first live-action film, tapping Pearce and Fred Leahy to supervise the production. Treasure Island (1950) became a box office success, earning $4.8 million in worldwide box office rentals. For their follow-up project, The Story of Robin Hood and His Merrie Men (1952), Pearce was again the producer. Before shooting, he had the film storyboarded and shipped the thumbnail sketches and the script to Disney for his approval.

Because of the postwar currency restrictions, Pearce could not take his earned salaries overseas; thus, he resided in England. Nevertheless, he assisted in developing The Mickey Mouse Club (1955–1959) along with Bill Walsh and Hal Adelquist. One of his contributions was the appearance of the puppet Sooty (operated by Harry Corbett) during the series' first two seasons.

== Death ==
On July 4, 1955, Pearce died at his London home after suffering a heart attack. He was survived by his wife and two daughters; one of whom named Anne was married to Stanley Kramer from 1950 to 1963.

== Filmography ==
=== Features ===
Title	Year	Credit
Snow White and the Seven Dwarfs	1937	Director
Fantasia	1940	Story development
Bambi	1942	Actor, writer
Victory Through Air Power	1943	Writer
Song of the South	1946	Producer
So Dear to My Heart	1948	Associate producer
Treasure Island	1950	Producer
The Story of Robin Hood and His Merrie Men	1952	Producer
The Sword and the Rose	1953	Producer
Rob Roy: The Highland Rogue	1953	Producer

=== TV shows ===
Title	Year	Credit	Series
Season 1, Episode 2: “Guest Star Day: Wally Boag; Mickey Mouse Club Serial: What I Want to Be - Part 2”	1955	Production supervisor	The Mickey Mouse Club
Season 3, Episode 15: “All About Magic”	1957	Writer	Disney anthology television series

== Bibliography ==
- Barrier, Michael (1999). Hollywood Cartoons: American Animation in Its Golden Age. Oxford University Press. ISBN 978-0-19-802079-0.
- Barrier, Michael (2008). The Animated Man: A Life of Walt Disney. University of California Press. ISBN 978-0-520-25619-4.
- Gabler, Neal (2006). Walt Disney: The Triumph of the American Imagination. New York: Vintage Books. ISBN 978-0-6797-5747-4.
- Ghez, Didier; Gant, George (2012). "Piercing the Perce Pearce Mystery". Walt's People: Volume 12 — Talking Disney with the Artists who Knew Him. Xlibris Corporation. pp. 55–66. ISBN 978-1-4771-4790-0.
- Johnston, Ollie; Thomas, Frank (1990). Walt Disney's Bambi: The Story and the Film. Stewart, Tabori & Chang. ISBN 1-55670-160-8.
