= Tianjin (disambiguation) =

Tianjin is a municipality in China. It may also refer to entities associated with the municipality:

== Schools ==
- Tianjin University, a national key public research university
- Tianjin International School, a private, international school in Hexi District, Tianjin
- International School of Tianjin, an international school in Jinnan District, Tianjin

== Businesses ==
- Tianjin Airlines, based in Dongli District, Tianjin
- Tianjin FAW, an automobile company based in Tianjin, also a couple of car models produced by the company

== Other uses ==
- Tianjin dialect, a Mandarin dialect spoken in Tianjin
- Tianjin railway station, the principal railway station of Tianjin
- Tianjin Open, a WTA tennis tournament
- Tianjin Provisional Government (1900–1902), a government formed during the Boxer Rebellion
- Tianjin (crater), a crater on the far side of the Moon

== See also ==
- 2015 Tianjin explosions
- Tianjin Agricultural University
- Tianjin Medical University
- Tianjin Normal University, a public research university
- Tianjin University of Commerce
- Tianjin University of Finance and Economics
- Tianjin University of Science and Technology
- Tianjin University of Sport
- Tianjin Crafts and Arts Professional College
- Tianjin Air Cargo, a cargo airline
