= Chō Kōsoku Galvion =

Japanese anime television series

- 超攻速ガルビオン
- Genre: Mecha, science fiction
- Written by: Tsunehisa Ito
- Directed by: Akira Shigino
- Music by: Masao Nakajima
- Country of origin: Japan
- Original language: Japanese
- No. of episodes: 22

Production
- Producers: Kyozo Utsunomiya (TV Asahi); Toshiro Sakuma (Kokusai Eiga-sha)
- Animators: Kokusai Eiga-sha; Artmic; P.C.N
- Production companies: TV Asahi; Kokusai Eiga-sha

Original release
- Network: ANN (TV Asahi)
- Release: 3 February – 29 June 1984

Chō Kōsoku Galvion (超攻速ガルビオン, Chō Kōsoku Garubion; lit. Super High Speed Galvion) is a 22-episode anime television series mecha series that aired in Japan in 1984. It revolves around criminals using robots to save innocents in exchange for years being cut from their long prison sentences. The program did not fare very well and had its planned number of episodes cut due to the bankruptcy of its sponsor, Takatoku Toys. A 23rd episode was partially completed but did not air. Episode 22 was a typical episode but had a 35-second epilogue tacked onto the end that explained the series' planned outcome via voice-over narration and stills. This series was also one of the last to be animated by the studio Kokusai Eiga-sha.

== Story ==
In the 23rd century, billionaire Rei Midoriyama creates a secret organization called Circus to combat a hidden group called Shadow that is taking over the world. When she can't find qualified pilots for Circus' main mecha, the Galvion, she cuts a deal with two convicts, Mu and Maya, to lead the fight against Shadow.

== Characters ==
- Mu (voice actor: Kōichi Hashimoto);
- Maya (voice actor: Hirotaka Suzuoki);
- Inka (voice actor: Yukiko Nashiwa);
- Rei Midoriyama (voice actor: Keiko Yokozawa);
- Henry McMillan (voice actor: Kenyu Horiuchi);

== Mecha ==
- Circus-1 Galvion
  - Circus-1
  - Road Attacker
- Circus-2
- Circus-3 Xector
  - Circus-3
  - Kyoukou Keitai
- Excalibur
  - Road Machine
  - Road Fighter
- Goblin
  - Road Machine
  - Road Fighter
- Road Chaser
- Breast Chaser
- Atomic Chaser
- Rescue Chaser
- MB-α3 Videus
- MB-α4 Ragdoll
- MB-α7 Lias
- MB-α10 Golem
- MB-α11 Vargas
- MB-α12 Brian

== Episodes ==
No.	Title	Directed by	Written by	Original release date
1	"The Mysterious Large Organization Shadow" "Nazo no Dai Soshiki Shadō" (Japanese: 謎の大組織 シャドウ)	Akira Shigino	Tsunehisa Ito	February 3, 1984
2	"Grand Prix Bombshell" "Guranpuri Dai Bakusatsu" (Japanese: グランプリ大爆殺)	Yoshihide Kuriyama	Yoshihisa Araki	February 10, 1984
3	"Super Engine Recovery" "Chō Enjin Dai Dakkan" (Japanese: 超 エンジン大奪還)	Directed by : Yuji Uchida; Storyboarded by : Yutaka Kagawa	Yoshiyuki Suga	February 17, 1984
4	"The Big Explosion Game" "Dai Bakusō Gēmu" (Japanese: 大爆走ゲーム)	Hiroshi Negishi	Kazumasa Fujie	February 24, 1984
5	"Nitro Transport of Death" "Shi no Nitoro Dai Yusō" (Japanese: 死のニトロ大輸送)	Yoshihiko Yamatoya	Yoshiyuki Suga	March 2, 1984
6	"Great Assassination: Search for Weapons" "Dai Ansatsu・Buki o Sagase" (Japanese: 大暗殺・武器を捜せ)	Directed by : Yukihiro Shino; Storyboarded by : Akira Shigino	Yoshihisa Araki	March 9, 1984
7	"Great Bull Police Chase" "Buru Keikan Dai Tsuiseki" (Japanese: ブル警官大追跡)	Makoto Nagao	Tsunehisa Ito	March 16, 1984
8	"The Great Rei Midoriyama Assassination Order" "Rei Midoriyama Dai Ansatsu Shirei" (Japanese: レイ緑山大暗殺指令)	Directed by : Yukihiro Shino; Storyboarded by : Yoshinobu Shigino	Haruya Yamazaki	March 23, 1984
9	"Big Eruption! Poison Death Mine" "Dai Funshutsu! Dokushi Kōzan" (Japanese: 大噴出! 毒死鉱山)	Directed by : Yoshihiko Yamatoya; Storyboarded by : Tetsurō Amino	Yoshihisa Araki	March 30, 1984
10	"The Great Farewell" "Ōinaru Wakare" (Japanese: 大いなる別れ)	Directed by : Yasuo Ishikawa; Storyboarded by : Hiroshi Negishi	Yoshiyuki Suga	April 6, 1984
11	"Big Experiment! Weapon of Ambition" "Dai Jikken! Yabō no Heiki" (Japanese: 大実験! 野望の兵器)	Yukihiro Shino	Tsunehisa Ito	April 13, 1984
12	"Great Horror! Human Hunting" "Dai Senritsu! Ningen Kari" (Japanese: 大戦慄! 人間狩り)	Directed by : Yuji Kato; Storyboarded by : Yoshinobu Shigino	Haruya Yamazaki	April 20, 1984
13	"Introducting! The Super-Secret Weapon" "Dai Tōjō! Chō Himitsu Heiki" (Japanese: 大登場! 超秘密兵器)	Directed by : Yukihiro Shino; Storyboarded by : Makoto Nagao, Akira Shigino	Tsunehisa Ito	April 27, 1984
14	"Love Battlefield Rally" "Koi no Senjō Dai Rarī" (Japanese: 恋の戦場大ラリー)	Directed by : Yasuo Ishikawa; Storyboarded by : Masashi Ikeda	Yoshihisa Araki	May 4, 1984
15	"Great Lightning! Million Volt Trap" "Daiden Ya! Hyakuman V no Wana" (Japanese: 大電殺! 百万Vの罠)	Hiroko Tokita	Yoshiyuki Suga	May 11, 1984
16	"Hell's Army: Massive Attack!" "Jigoku Gundan・Dai Shurai" (Japanese: 地獄軍団・大襲来!)	Yuji Kato	Haruya Yamazaki	May 18, 1984
17	"Bull Police: Great Love" "Buru Keikan・Dai Ren'nai" (Japanese: ブル警官・大恋愛)	Yasuo Ishikawa	Yoshiyuki Suga	May 25, 1984
18	"Blues in the Big City..." "Dai Tokai ni Burūsu o…" (Japanese: 大都会にブルースを…)	Directed by : Yuji Kato; Storyboarded by : Hiroshi Negishi	Kazumasa Fujie	June 1, 1984
19	"Base Explosion! Puppy in Action" "Kichi Bakuha! Koinu Dai Katsuyaku" (Japanese: 基地爆破! 小犬大活躍)	Directed by : Yukihiro Shino; Storyboarded by : Tetsurō Amino	Tsunehisa Ito	June 8, 1984
20	"Artificial Island in the Fog: Great Naval Battle" "Kiri no Jinkōshima Dai Kaisen" (Japanese: 霧の人工島・大海戦)	Junichi Sakata	Yoshihisa Araki	June 15, 1984
21	"He Walks! Rolon" "Arukun da! Roron" (Japanese: 歩くんだ! ロロン)	Directed by : Hiroshi Negishi, Yuji Kato; Storyboarded by : Yuji Kato	Tsunehisa Ito	June 22, 1984
22	"An Amazoness Warrior's Love" "Amazonesu Senshi no Koi" (Japanese: アマゾネス戦士の恋)	Yasuo Ishikawa	Yoshiyuki Suga	June 29, 1984
23	"Circus vs. Tank Corps" "Sākasu Tai Dai Sensha Gundan" (Japanese: サーカス対大戦車軍団)	N/A	N/A	Unaired
24	"Moneylender Oz, Big Deficit" "Kanekashi Ōzu, Ōakaji" (Japanese: 金貸しオーズ、大赤字)	N/A	N/A	Unaired
25	"The Great Secret of the Vanished Village" "Kieta Mura no Dai Himitsu" (Japanese: 消えた村の大秘密)	N/A	N/A	Unaired
26	"The 13th Man" "13-Banme no Otoko" (Japanese: 13番目の男)	N/A	N/A	Unaired
