= Peter Fernandez =

American actor (1927–2010)

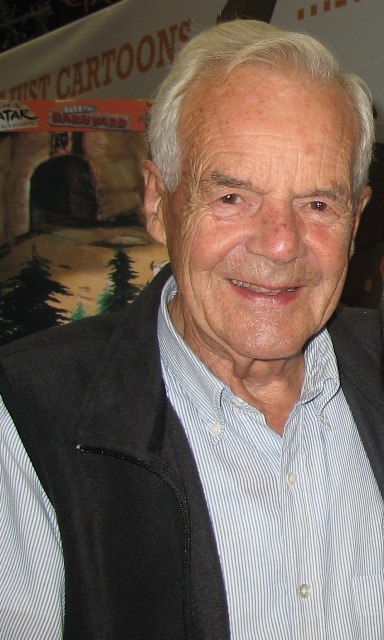
- Fernandez in 2007
- Born: January 29, 1927; New York City, U.S.
- Died: July 15, 2010 (aged 83); Pomona, New York, U.S.
- Occupations: Actor; voice director; writer
- Years active: 1934–2009
- Spouse: Noel Smith (m. 1978)
- Children: 3

Peter Fernandez (January 29, 1927 – July 15, 2010) was an American actor, voice director, and writer. Despite a career extending from the 1930s, he is probably best known for his roles in the 1967 anime Speed Racer. Fernandez co-wrote the scripts, was the voice director, and translated the English-language version of the theme song. He was instrumental in introducing many Japanese anime series to English-speaking audiences. He is also the narrator in the audio version of It Looked Like Spilt Milk.

== Life and career ==
Peter Fernandez was born in Manhattan, New York on January 29, 1927, one of three children to Pedro and Edna Fernandez. His two siblings were Edward and Jacqueline. He was of Cuban, Irish, and French descent. Fernandez began his career as a child model for the John Robert Power Agency at age seven, to support his family during the Great Depression. He then appeared on both radio and Broadway, appearing in Lillian Hellman's Watch on the Rhine in 1941. He was drafted into the United States Army at age 18, late in World War II. His radio appearances included roles on Mr. District Attorney, Let's Pretend, Gang Busters, My Best Girls, Superman, and Suspense, as well as soap operas. After his discharge from the Army in 1946, he became a prolific writer for both radio and pulp fiction. He also authored the children's book Bedtime Stories from the Bible.

Fernandez is known for his voice work and has been heard in English adaptions of many foreign films. Fernandez is best known as the American voice of the title character—and his brother Racer X—in the 1967 anime series Speed Racer. Besides acting in Speed Racer, he was the lyricist and performer of the English version of that show's theme song. He returned in the 2008 animated series Speed Racer: The Next Generation to play a middle-aged Headmaster Spritle. In the live-action 2008 film Speed Racer, Fernandez had a small part as a racing announcer. The rapid-fire delivery of dialogue made famous by Speed Racer was devised by Fernandez and his American voice co-stars in order to make the dialogue sync with the original Japanese mouth movements.

He provided the voice for Benton Tarantella, a resurrected film director for Courage the Cowardly Dog, which he has said was his favorite. He made cameos credited as "additional characters" in several episodes, besides his role as the voice of Robot Randy. He was a voice director for Robert Mandell's Adventures of the Galaxy Rangers and Princess Gwenevere and the Jewel Riders. Additional voice acting credits include in such dubbed anime titles as Astro Boy, Gigantor, Marine Boy, Star Blazers and Superbook.

In 2007, he was awarded The Special American Anime Award for Outstanding Achievement. Fernandez was interviewed in 2008 on his activities and voice over work. His last major public appearance was at the 2009 Seattle, Washington Sakura-Con.

== Personal life and death ==
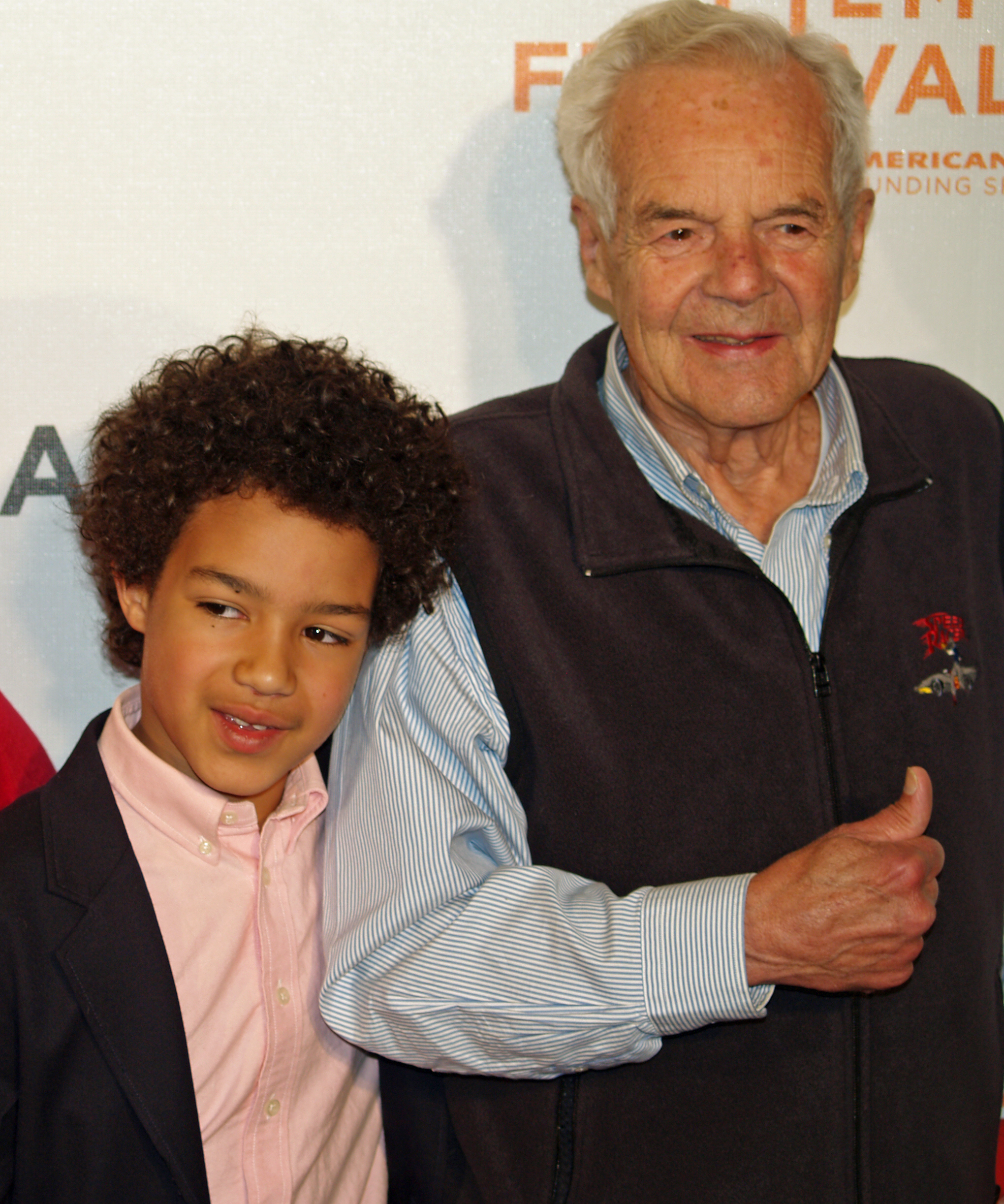
Fernandez attending the 2008 Tribeca Film Festival premiere of Speed Racer with his grandson

Fernandez lived in Pomona, New York, with his wife, Noel Smith, whom he married in 1978; together they had three children.

He died on July 15, 2010, after suffering from lung cancer at the age of 83.

== Filmography ==
=== Live-action ===
- Captain Video and His Video Rangers
- City Across the River – Frank Cusack
- Pulitzer Prize Playhouse
- Suspense – Miguel
- Leave It to Papa – Son
- Armstrong Circle Theatre
- Speed Racer – Race Commentator
- Kraft Theatre – Harry
- Joseph Schildkraut Presents
- Macbeth – Donalbain
- Crunch and Des
- I Spy

=== Japanese animation dubbing ===
- Astro Boy
- Gigantor – Buttons Brilliant, Johnny
- Kuro Kami: the Animation – Ryuujin Nagamine
- Marine Boy – Dr. Mariner, Piper
- Speed Racer – Speed Racer, Racer X, Additional Voices
- Star Blazers: The Bolar Wars – Mark Venture
- Superbook – Additional Voices
- Thunderbirds 2086 – Additional Voices

=== American animation ===
- Ace Ventura: Pet Detective – Additional Voices
- Courage the Cowardly Dog – Benton Tarantella, Robot Randy, the Magic Tree of Nowhere, the Spirit of the Harvest Moon, Mad Dog
- Kenny the Shark – Additional Voices
- Princess Gwenevere and the Jewel Riders – Max, Grimm the Dragon
- Speed Racer: The Next Generation – Headmaster Spritle, Speed Racer Sr.

=== Film ===
- Alakazam the Great – Alakazam (speaking voice)
- The Enchanted Journey
- Godzilla vs. the Sea Monster – Ryota
- Godzilla vs. the Smog Monster – Yukio
- Plan Bee – Bellza
- Planet of Storms
- Planet of the Vampires
- Son of Godzilla – Goro
- Spider's Web: A Pig's Tale – Noiman Ja Rahr
- Sport Billy – Narrator, Additional Voices
- What's Eating Gilbert Grape – ADR Voice

=== Video games ===
- The Longest Journey – Elder Banda, Minstrum Yerin, Old Alatien man

=== Other works ===
- Peter Absolute on the Erie Canal (Audio Book Serial)
- Speed Racer (Theme Song Lyrics)
- X-Minus One (Radio Series)
- Baby Animals Just Want to Have Fun (VHS)
- It Looked Like Spilt Milk (Audio Book on Cassette and Disc)

== Staff ==
=== Dialogue direction ===
- Blood Link (1982)
- Bonheur d'occasion (1983)
- A Question of Silence (1982)
- Infra-Man (1976)
- Ingenjör Andrées luftfärd (1982)
- Kenny the Shark (TV series, 2003, episodes 1–13)
- La Diagonale du fou (1984)
- Ultraman (1966)
- Strange Shadows in an Empty Room (1976)

=== Direction ===
- Coup de tête (1979, uncredited)
- School's Out (TV, 1999, uncredited)
- The Enchanted Journey (1984, uncredited)

=== Dubbing direction ===
- Nattens engel (1998)

=== Voice direction ===
- 2019, After the Fall of New York (1983)
- Ace Ventura: Pet Detective (TV series, 1996, episodes 27–41)
- Al Andalus (1989)
- The Antichrist (1974)
- Assassination in Rome (1965)
- Au nom de tous les miens (1983)
- Au nom de tous les miens (TV miniseries, 1985)
- Bidaya wa nihaya (1960)
- The Black Corsair (1976)
- Bordella (1976, uncredited)
- Choice of Arms (1981)
- Christmas in Cartoontown (UAV, 1996)
- Ciske de Rat (1984, uncredited)
- Coup de torchon (1981)
- Courage the Cowardly Dog (TV series, 1999)
- The Desert of the Tartars (1976)
- Dogs of Hell (1982)
- Fei zhou chao ren (1994)
- Gandahar (1988)
- Goha (1958)
- Godzilla versus the Sea Monster (1966)
- Infra-Man (1976)
- Jalna (TV miniseries)|Jalna (TV miniseries, 1994)
- Jung-Gwok chiu-yan (1975)
- Kokusai himitsu keisatsu: Zettai zetsumi (1967)
- Le Grand pardon (1982)
- Love and Anarchy (1973)
- Les Chevaliers du ciel (TV series, 1967)
- The Magic Snowman (1988)
- Mimì metallurgico ferito nell'onore (1972, uncredited)
- The Nest (1979)
- Nuovo cinema Paradiso (1989)
- Onna hissatsu ken (1974)
- Piedone a Hong Kong (1975)
- Princess Gwenevere and the Jewel Riders (TV series, 1995)
- Puss 'N Boots Travels Around the World (1976)
- Satsujin ken 2 (1974)
- Shaka (1961)
- Stavisky... (1974, uncredited)
- That Man from Rio (1964)
- The Adventures of the Galaxy Rangers (TV series, 1986)
- The Secret of Anastasia (OAV, 1997)
- The Secret of Mulan (OAV, 1998)
- The Space Giants (TV series, 1967)
- Topâzu (1992)
- Tutto a posto e niente in ordine (1973)
- Un amour de Swann (1984)
- Un moment d'égarement (1977)
- Une histoire simple (1978)
- Vabank (1981)

=== Writing ===
- 2019 – Dopo la caduta di New York (1983, uncredited)
- Al Andalus (1989, uncredited)
- Au nom de tous les miens (1983, uncredited)
- Ciske de Rat (1984, uncredited)
- Coup de tête (1979, uncredited)
- Coup de tchon (1981, uncredited)
- El Nido (1979, uncredited)
- Faire l'amur – Emmanuelle et ses soeurs" (1971)
- Fei zhou chao ren (1994, uncredited)
- Gandahar (1988, uncredited)
- Godzilla versus the Sea Monster (1966, uncredited)
- Infra-Man (1976)
- Il Deserto dei Tartari (1976, uncredited)
- Ingenjör Andrées luftfärd (1982, uncredited)
- Jalna (TV miniseries, 1994, uncredited)
- Le Choix des armes (1981, uncredited)
- Le Grand prdon (1982, uncredited)
- Les Chevaliers du ciel (TV series, 1967, uncredited)
- Mélodie en sous-sol (1963, uncredited)
- Mimì metallurgico ferito nell'onore (1972, uncredited)
- Nattens engel (1998, uncredited)
- Onna hissatsu ken (1974, uncredited)
- Puss 'N Boots Travels Around the World (1976)
- Satsujin ken 2 (1974, uncredited)
- School's Out (TV, 1999, uncredited)
- Stavisky... (1974, uncredited)
- Tatsu no ko Tarô (1979, uncredited)
- The Alley Cats (1968)
- The Dirty Girls (1964)
- The Enchanted Journey (1984)
- The Mad Doctor Hump (1969)
- The Night the Animals Talked (1970)
- The Space Giants (TV series, 1967, uncredited)
- Topâzu (1992, uncredited)
- Ultraman (TV series, 1966)
- Une histoire simple
- Un moment d'égarement
- Un amour de Swann
- Woof! (1989)
