= It Looked Like Spilt Milk =

1947 picture book by Charles G. Shaw

First edition (publ. Harper & Row)

It Looked Like Spilt Milk is an American children's picture book, written and illustrated by Charles Green Shaw. Originally published in 1947, the illustrations are a series of changing white shapes against a blue background. The reader is asked to guess what the shape is or whether it is just "spilt milk". (The first page has the narration read, "Sometimes it looked like spilt milk. But it wasn't spilt milk". Before the shape changes, what it really looked like was milk that had been spilled out of a glass and ended up all over the table.) First the shape looked like spilt milk, then a rabbit, a bird, a pig, a sheep, a birthday cake, a tree, an ice cream cone, a flower, an angel, a squirrel, a mitten, and finally a great horned owl. But it wasn't any of those 13 things. (That is, as the first 13 pages read, "Sometimes it looked like 'item name'. But it wasn't 'item name'".) The silhouette shape makes the reader know it is a secret item until the last page. At the end of the book, the last page repeats the phrase as the first page's line (as the narration reads, "Sometimes it looked like spilt milk. But it wasn't spilt milk".). It wasn't really spilt milk but only a cloud in the sky. (That is, as the phrase—on the last page—reads, "It was just a cloud in the sky".) Then the silhouette shape becomes a real cloud in the daytime sky revealing that it was just a cloud. Then the changing white silhouette turns into a real cloud and the cloud goes up into the blue sky (which is what the white "item" really becomes). The last page becomes the blue sky and the white silhouette shape which turned into a cloud. On the last page, the silhouette shape is now a real item. That is, a cloud. Then the book ends.

A Scholastic Corporation edition was released in 1989. A board book version was published in 1993. An audio cassette and compact disc version by Live Oak Media was published in 1988 and has the narration of Peter Fernandez with the music heard at the beginning and end and read without music.

== Reception ==
Kirkus Reviews wrote "Children love to play this game from earliest identification, and will like a book that plays it with them. Blue and white silhouettes make a cute idea book."
