= Charles Green Shaw =

American painter and writer (1892–1974)

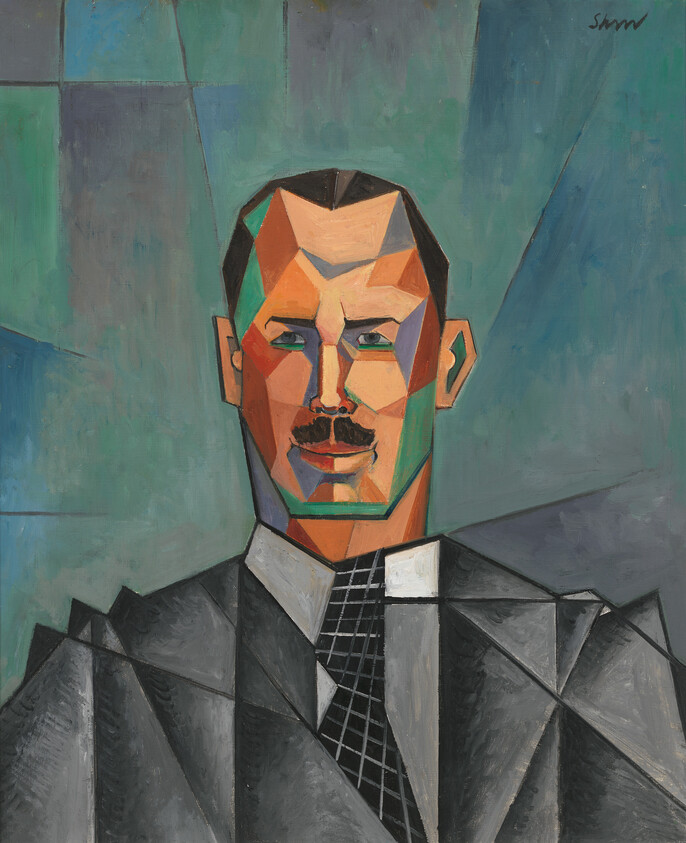
- Self Portrait (1930)
- Born: May 1, 1892; New York City, New York, US
- Died: April 2, 1974 (aged 81); New York City, New York, US
- Education: Yale University
- Occupations: Artist, writer, poet, illustrator
- Years active: 1919 - 1974 writing 1932 - 1974 art
- Organization: American Abstract Artists
- Known for: Geometric-biomorphic abstraction Witty writings about New York City in the 1920s
- Style: Concretionist; Montage; Abstract Expressionism.
- Movement: Modern Art, Abstract Art

Charles Green Shaw (May 1, 1892 – April 2, 1974) was an American painter, poet, writer, and illustrator. He was a key figure in early American abstract art. Shaw's paintings are part of most major collections of American Art, including the Art Institute of Chicago, Corcoran Gallery, the Metropolitan Museum of Art, the Musee d'Art Moderne de Paris, Museum of Fine Arts Boston, the Museum of Modern Art, the Smithsonian Institution, and the Whitney Museum.

Before turning to art in 1932, Shaw was a prominent writer for The New Yorker and Vanity Fair. He was also a poet, with more than 1,200 published poems.

== Early life ==
Shaw was born in New York City to Eva (née Morris) and Charles Green Shaw, a merchant. This was a wealthy family connected to the F. W. Woolworth Company fortune. However, Shaw was orphaned at a young age—his mother died when he was just three. As a result, he and his twin brother were raised by their uncle, Frank D. Shaw. He grew up spending summers in Newport, Rhode Island and Christmas at Mrs. William K. Vanderbilt's balls. He began drawing when he was six; he wrote and illustrated his first book, The Costumes of Nations, when he was nine.

Shaw attended the Friends Seminary and Berkley School. He graduated from Yale University in 1914. While at Yale, he befriended Cole Porter, joined St. Anthony Hall, and contributed artwork to campus humor magazine, The Yale Record. He studied architecture at Columbia University from 1914 to 1915.

Shaw was a Lieutenant in World War I, first receiving an assignment as a supply officer stationed in England. Then, he was assigned to the Army Air Force at Kelly Airfield in Texas. Over the course of eighteen months in the service, he never saw active duty. After the war, Shaw tried to follow the business model set by his family, and soon found he was ill-suited for selling real estate in New York City.

== Writer ==
Shaw started his career as a writer by the early 1920s. He worked as a freelance writer for magazines such as Harper's Bazaar, The New Yorker, The Smart Set, and Vanity Fair, focusing on theater and café society. Shaw was, according to Buck Pennington, "the master of the bon mot, the glib remark, the clever definition." He frequently created illustrations to go with his articles. He was also a journalist and a novelist. His articles were published in magazines such as Antiques, Connoisseur, House & Garden, and Life. He interviewed Adele Astaire, F. Scott Fitzgerald, Sinclair Lewis, George Jean Nathan, Michael Strange. One of his books that has been described as having "lasting merit" is The Lowdown, a collection celebrity character sketches.

In April 1936, Shaw decided to write and illustrate books for children. In May 1939, he finally found an editor interested in his ideas—Margaret Wise Brown, who would go on to write the children's classic Goodnight Moon. Shaw published dozens of books for children, including It Looked Like Spilt Milk in 1947. He also illustrated books for Brown.

In 1952 when he was 62 years old, Shaw started writing poetry and had some 1,200 poems published in Literary Review, the New York Tribune, Poetry Digest, and Trace. He also released four poetry collections.

== Art ==
As an artist, Shaw was "essentially self-taught." In 1927, he enrolled in Thomas Hart Benton's class at the Art Students League of New York. He also studied privately with George Luks from 1926 to 1928. In 1929, he lived in Paris for a month, visiting museums and meeting artists. He found a great deal of inspiration in London, going to the park and sketching every day. Buck Pennington wrote that Shaw "considered himself a painter" when he returned to New York City in 1932.

In 1933, he started a series of works called Plastic Polygon, working on this series of abstracted architectural paintings for about seven years. According to the Smithsonian American Art Museum, Plastic Polygon included "architectural forms of the New York City skyline" and helped establish his reputation. Shaw called his style of modern art "concretionist" because he painted "concrete objects" rather than abstractions.

In 1934, Shaw had a solo exhibition at Valentine Gallery in New York City. From May to October 1935, he also had a show at Gallery of Living Art that was organized by Albert Gallatin. This was the first one-man show at the Gallery of Living Art; Gallatin said he broke his own rule because "Mr. Shaw is doing the most important abstract painting in America today." The next year, Gallatin curated a show at Reinhardt Gallery called American Concretionists, which included Shaw's works and those of others. Also in 1936, Shaw was a founding member of the American Abstract Artists and participated in their first annual exhibition. This group was established when abstract art had not fully won critical respect, and many such artists struggled to find galleries willing to display their work.

In the 1940s and moving forward, Shaw shifted from the strict geometrical format of the polygon paintings, focusing on abstract expressionism. He softened the color palette for some of his paintings. He also explored another medium, making montages by mountings antique items related to games on fabric, such as game boards and antique playing and tarot cards. In addition, he designed posters, book covers, and illustrated picture books.

A significant figure in American abstract art, Shaw was the only American artist to have two solo exhibitions at Guggenheim Museum in his lifetime. In total, he had thirty one-man shows in galleries, museums and traveling exhibitions in America, Europe, and Japan.

== Affiliations ==
Shaw was a member of American Abstract Artists, the Artists Equity Association (now called the New York Artists Equity Association), the Century Association, the Federation of Modern Painters & Sculptors, the Nantucket Art Association (now called the Artists Association of Nantucket), the Newport Art Association, the Poetry Society of America, and The Poetry Society.

== Awards ==
Shaw won the Michael Strange Poetry Award in 1954.

The Nantucket Art Association gave Shaw the Nantucket Art Association Award in 1958, and first prize in 1960.

== Personal ==
Shaw was a noted collector of tobacciana. In 1975, his collection sold at Christie's for £41,403.

When he was 81 years old, Shaw died at his home at 340 East 57th Street in New York City on April 2, 1974 He bequeathed fifty boxes of archival materials to the Smithsonian's American Art Museum. His papers include correspondence with F. Scott Fitzgerald, Clarence Darrow, Anita Loos, H. L. Mencken, and Cole Porter.

== Publications ==
=== Books ===
- Shaw, Charles G. (1927). Heart in a Hurricane. Illustrations by Ralph Barton New York: Brenton's.
- — (1930) Nightlife, Day. New York: Day
- — (1930) The Low-Down. New York: Henry Holt.
- — (1931) Lady by Chance. New York: Macaulay.
- — (1938) New York—Oddly Enough. New York: Farrar, Rinehart
- — (1940). The Giant of Central Park. New York: William R. Scott

=== Children's books ===
- — (1941) The Guess Book. New York: William R. Scott, Inc.
- — (1942) The Blue Guess Book (and illustrator) New York: William R. Scott
- — (1947) It Looked Like Spilt Milk. New York: Harper.

=== Poetry collections ===
- — (1959) Into the Light, Fine Editions
- — (1962) Image of Life. Poets of America Publishing Co.
- — (1966) Time Has No Edge: A Poetry Collection. William-Frederick
- — (1969) Moment of the Now: A Poetry Collection. Profile Press

=== Essays and reporting ===
- — (February 21, 1925). "From the opinions of a New Yorker". The Theatre. The New Yorker. Vol. 1, no. 1. p. 14.
- — (February 21, 1925). "The Painted Lily : a portrait". The Theatre. The New Yorker. Vol. 1, no. 1. p. 14.
- — (February 21, 1925). "Magic a la mode". The New Yorker. Vol. 1, no. 1. p. 15.
- — (February 28, 1925). "Speaking of the theatre". The New Yorker. Vol. 1, no. 2. p. 28.
- — (March 14, 1925). "From the last row on a first night". The New Yorker. Vol. 1, no. 4. p. 16.
- — (March 14, 1925). "I go on a diet, and —". The New Yorker. Vol. 1, no. 4. p. 19.
- — (March 21, 1925). "A young man-about-town". New York, Etc. The New Yorker. Vol. 1, no. 5. p. 24.
- — (March 21, 1925). "What's in a name?". Books. The New Yorker. Vol. 1, no. 5. p. 29.
- — (April 4, 1925). "Pick-ups here and there". The New Yorker. Vol. 1, no. 7. p. 28.
- — (April 18, 1925). "Familiar portraits". The New Yorker. Vol. 1, no. 9. p. 22.
- — (April 25, 1925). "Speaking of Europe". The New Yorker. Vol. 1, no. 10. p. 28.
- — (May 2, 1925). "A season's recollection". The New Yorker. Vol. 1, no. 11. p. 20.
- — (May 2, 1925). "Why is it that when I plan to pass a quiet evening alone that—". The New Yorker. Vol. 1, no. 11. p. 28.
- — (May 16, 1925). "From the diary of a would-be pedestrian". The New Yorker. Vol. 1, no. 13. p. 20.
- — (May 30, 1925). "On the wire". The New Yorker. Vol. 1, no. 15. p. 23.

=== Illustrator ===
- Brown, Margaret Wise (1944) Black and White. Illustrations by Charles G. Shaw. New York: Harper & Brothers.
- — (1947) Winter Noisy Book. Illustrations by Charles G. Shaw. New York: W. R. Scott.
- Felton, Harold W. (1971) James Weldon Johnson. Illustrations by Charles G. Shaw. New York: Dodd.
- McCullough, John G. (1947) Dark is Dark. Illustrations by Charles G. Shaw. New York: W. R. Scott.
- Pedersen, Elsa (1968) House Upon a Rock. Illustrations by Charles G. Shaw. New York: Atheneum
- Scott, William Rufus (1951) The Apple that Jack Ate. Illustrations by Charles G. Shaw. New York: W. R. Scott.
- — (1944) This Is The Milk That Jack Drank. Illustrations by Charles G. Shaw. New York: W. R. Scott.
- — (1950) This Is the Water That Jack Drank. Illustrations by Charles G. Shaw. New York: W. R. Scott.

=== Exhibition catalogs ===
- New York Cubists: works by A.E. Gallatin, George L.K. Morris, and Charles G. Shaw from the thirties and forties, January 16–February 27, 1988. New York: Hirschl & Adler Galleries. 1987.
