= Justin Wright =

American animator (1981–2008)

- Born: March 8, 1981; Sacramento, California, US
- Died: March 18, 2008 (aged 27); Emeryville, California, US
- Occupation: Animator

Justin Wright (March 8, 1981 – March 18, 2008) was an American artist who worked at Pixar Animation Studios for slightly over a year until his death.

== Biography ==
Born with several congenital heart defects, Wright received a heart transplant at the age of 12. A year after his transplant, he was a recipient of a wish from the Make-A-Wish Foundation, which was to visit Disney World. At Disney World he was able to take a tour of their animation studios. The tour cemented his love of animation and storytelling.

Wright graduated from Sacramento Adventist Academy in 1999, attended Pacific Union College for two years, and also graduated from California Institute of the Arts in Valencia, California. Prior to attending California Institute of the Arts, Wright worked as a Production Assistant at Pixar. He wanted to pursue his education so he chose to leave Pixar hoping one day to return, which he did. His animation credits included the line drawings at the end of the film Ratatouille (2007), the storyboards for WALL-E (2008) and the short film Presto (2008).

== Death ==
On the evening of Tuesday, March 18, 2008, Wright collapsed at Pixar and he died instantly of a heart attack, ten days after his 27th birthday. WALL-E is dedicated in “loving memory” of him, as seen in the end credits.
