= Kokusai Eiga-sha =

Japanese animation studio

Movie International Pictures (MIC)
- Native name: 国際映画社
- Formerly: Kokusai Eiga-sha (1978 - 1986)
- Industry: Animation
- Founded: 1978; 48 years ago
- Fate: Ceased animation operations. Dormancy
- Headquarters: Nemuro, Hokkaido, Japan

Kokusai Eiga-sha (国際映画社), is a dormant Japanese animation studio headquartered in Nemuro, Hokkaido, Japan. It is famous for its mecha anime throughout the 80s.

Due to the losses incurred in Super High Speed Galvion and the bankruptcy of its sponsor, Kokusai Eiga-sha closed its animation unit, renamed itself to Movie International Company Ltd. (MIC), and became mostly dormant. It currently simply manages the copyrights of its anime.

== TV series ==
- Josephina the Whale (1979) - produced with Ashi Productions
- Zukkoke Knight: Don De La Mancha (1980) - produced with Ashi Productions
- Space Warrior Baldios (1980–1981) - produced with Ashi Productions
- Monchhichi Twins (1980) - produced with Ashi Productions
- Mechakko Dotakon (1981)
- Wakakusa Monogatari Yori Wakakusa no Yon Shimai (1981) - produced with Toei Animation
- J9 series (1981–1984)
  - Galactic Cyclone Braiger (1981–1982) - produced with Toei Animation
  - Galactic Gale Baxingar (1982–1983)
  - Galactic Whirlwind Sasuraiger (1983–1984)
- Honey Honey no Suteki na Bouken (1981–1982) - produced with Toei Animation
- Acrobunch (1982)
- Little Pollon (1982–1983)
- Mission Outer Space Srungle (1983–1984)
- Nanako SOS (1983)
- Chou Kousoku Galvion (1984) - produced with Studio Robin and Artmic
- Souya Monogatari (1984)
- Futari Daka (1984–1985)

== Movies ==
- Space Warrior Baldios (1981) - produced with Ashi Productions
- Ai no Kiseki: Doctor Norman Monogatari (1982) (TV Movie)
