= List of Ulysses 31 episodes =

Ulysses 31 is an animated science fiction television series produced by DIC Audiovisuel and Tokyo Movie Shinsha. The show comprises 26 half-hour episodes which first aired between 1981 and 1982 on FR3. The following episode titles were used for the original French version as well as in the international version for Europe and North and Latin America. The order of episodes on the DVD release is different however.

No.	Title	French title	Original release date	Prod. code
1	"Vengeance of the Gods"	"Le Cyclope"	10 October 1981	1
On his trip back to Earth, Ulysses' son is carried off by the Cyclops to give sight to his followers with Telemachus' life force. Ulysses destroys the Cyclops and saves Telemachus, Yumi and Numinor. In retaliation, the ancient Gods then send his ship, the Odyssey, into an unknown part of space with the bulk of its crew cursed to remain lifeless, floating in mid-air until Ulysses finds the Kingdom of Hades.
2	"The Black Sphere"	"Hératos"	17 October 1981	3
Ulysses meets an old scholar named Heratos and his assistant, a young Zotrian woman named Atina. Heratos gives Ulysses a map that he says is to the Kingdom of Hades, but is actually to the Graveyard of Wrecks and Hulks which no-one has ever left alive, because the gods threatened Atina's life if he did not deceive Ulysses. While there, Telemachus finds the black sphere which contains a map of Olympus.
3	"Flowers of Fear"	"Les Fleurs sauvages"	24 October 1981	2
The Odyssey comes across a lifeless city world. On hearing that its people had the technology to bring the dead back to life, Yumi takes Numinor to the planet to revive him, but she learns why there is no life in the city.
4	"Chronos, Father of Time"	"Chronos"	31 October 1981	4
Ulysses is saved from a Trident attack by Chronos, the god of time (depicted with two faces like the Roman god Janus), who wants to use him as leverage to be allowed to reenter the home of the gods.
5	"The Lost Planet"	"La Planète perdue"	7 November 1981	5
The ship passes a moon that brings Numinor back to life, since it is from his home planet of Zotra. When they investigate, the children disappear and Numinor suspects that they have been kidnapped by a legendary witch.
6	"Guardian of the Cosmic Winds"	"E'ole" or "Le Coffret des vents cosmiques"	14 November 1981	6
Aeolus, King of the winds, kidnaps Ulysses to provide entertainment for his daughter's birthday party. Unable to watch her father's cruel sport, she frees the captives and helps them escape.
7	"The Eternal Punishment"	"Sisyphe" or "L'Éternel Recommencement"	21 November 1981	7
Ulysses encounters Sisyphus, a king condemned to fill a crater with boulders for all eternity for having dared to want the secret of immortality. Zeus has promised Sisyphus that he can leave if he makes Ulysses take his place.
8	"Mutiny on Board"	"La Révolte des compagnons"	28 November 1981	8
A space storm revives the companions as crazed automatons who take over the ship and try to crash it into space glaciers with the help of a trident battleship.
9	"Secret of the Sphinx"	"Le Sphynx"	5 December 1981	9
Passing through the domain of the great Sphinx, Ulysses must answer his riddle to leave safely. His treacherous daughter kidnaps the children and plots to make Ulysses her slave.
10	"Temple of the Laestrygonians"	"Les Lestrygons"	12 December 1981	10
The Odyssey arrives on a tropical planet, where the ruling tyrant uses a magic prism to shrink them.
11	"Trapped Between Fire and Ice"	"Charybde et Scylla"	19 December 1981 (Note: Possible date typo: the date is likely supposed to read "19 December 1981".)	11
Trying to help a stranded astronaut, Ulysses tries to find a hidden base on one of the deadly twin planets Scylla or Charybdis.
12	"The Seat of Forgetfulness"	"Le Fauteuil de l'oubli"	26 December 1981	12
Ulysses follows a Trident carrier in hopes of learning more about the way out of Olympus, and finds himself trapped in bizarre worlds. To save the children, he will have to give up his memories.
13	"Song of Danger"	"Les Sirènes"	2 January 1982	13
Pirates kidnap the children to force Ulysses and No-No to brave the danger of the Sirens, said to guard a map of the Olympus universe.
14	"Phantoms from the Swamp"	"Le Marais des doubles"	9 January 1982	14
Coming across a piece of Zotra that could bring Numinor back to life, Ulysses and Yumi pursue it to a swamp planet where they are ambushed by monsters who can copy their forms.
15	"Before the Flood"	"La Deuxième arche"	16 January 1982	15
Ulysses and the crew of the Odyssey land on a planet similar to prehistoric Earth. They encounter a winged female named Sauria, whose people are under attack from mutant vultures called Keconopters.
16	"The Magic Spells of Circe"	"Circe, la magicienne"	23 January 1982	16
The crew of the Odyssey are enslaved by the magic of the enchantress Circe and turned into pig-people to build a tower that will house all the knowledge of the universe.
17	"The Hidden Truth"	"Neree" or "La vérité engloutie"	30 January 1982	17
The shapechanger Nereus calls Ulysses for help when Shark Men, servants of the gods, take over his planet.
18	"Lost in the Labyrinth"	"Le Labyrinthe du Minotaure"	6 February 1982	18
Princess Ariadne comes upon the Odyssey, and asks for Ulysses' help in saving her lover Theseus, who has been exiled to her father's labyrinth to be killed by the fearsome Minotaur.
19	"At the Heart of the Universe"	"Atlas"	13 February 1982	19
Mercurius, the bubble-dwelling "grandson of the gods", enlists Ulysses' help in taking a jewel from the brow of the giant Atlas under the promise that it will give him the power to send Ulysses home.
20	"The Magician in Black"	"Le Magicien noir"	20 February 1982	20
Ulysses is saved from an attack by the most powerful magician in the universe who breaks the gods' curse on his crew, but as payment for his services, demands to hunt Ulysses's best men.
21	"The Lotus Eaters"	"Les Lotophages"	27 February 1982	24
Needing raw materials to repair the Odyssey, Ulysses travels to a world where the inhabitants are addicted to eating seeds which induce amnesia.
22	"The City of Cortex"	"La Cité de Cortex"	6 March 1982	22
The Odyssey is dragged to a planet populated by machines, and governed by the tyrannical computer Cortex. One of its inhabitants, a "female" robot named Nanette, falls in love with No-No (a reference to a play called No, No, Nanette).
23	"Strange Meeting"	"Ulysse rencontre Ulysse"	13 March 1982	23
Ulysses and the children are sent back in time and meet the original Ulysses, Telemachus and Penelope of Homer's epic.
24	"Rebellion on Lemnos"	"Les Revoltées de Lemnos"	20 March 1982	21
Princess Hypsipyle, who comes from the planet Lemnos is found by Ulysses. She tells them that the women of her planet are being forced by the Shark Men to build ships for the gods.
25	"Calypso"	"Calypso"	27 March 1982	25
The Odyssey responds to a distress call from Queen Calypso, who tells him that if he saves her planet she will tell him the way back to earth. Calypso has been ordered by Zeus to betray Ulysses, but she falls in love with him and cannot carry out the gods' orders.
26	"The Kingdom of Hades"	"Le Royaume d'Hadès"	3 April 1982	26
Ulysses and his companions reach the Kingdom of Hades. They meet Orpheus, who seeks Ulysses' help to find his love, Eurydice, who has been taken to the Kingdom of Hades by Charon. Hades, the god of death, tells Ulysses that he must leave his companions behind if he wishes to return to Earth. He rejects the offer, which was a final test, and they all return home.

== Japanese version ==
A number of the episode titles in the Japanese version of Ulysses 31 were modified or simplified from the original French. The order in which the episodes aired also varied to some extent.

1. Cyclops (シクロープ, Shikurōpu)
BBC Date-7 November 1985
2. The Lost Planet (失われた惑星, Ushinawareta wakusei)
BBC Date-14 November 1985
3. Aeolus (エオール, Eōru)
BBC Date-21 November 1985
4. Heratos (エラトス, Eratosu)
BBC Date-28 November 1985
5. Sphinx (スフィンクス, Sufinkusu)
BBC Date-5 December 1985
6. Lestrigon (レストリゴン, Resutorigon)
BBC Date-12 December 1985
7. Sisyphus (シジフォス, Shijifuosu)
BBC Date-19 December 1985
8. Wild Flowers (野生の花, Yasei no hana)
BBC Date-2 January 1986
9. Chronos (クロノス, Kuronosu)
BBC Date-9 January 1986
10. The Mutiny of the Companions (コンパニオンの反乱, Conpanion no hanran)
BBC Date-16 January 1986
11. The Seat of Forgetfulness (忘却の椅子, Bōkyaku no Isu)
BBC Date-23 January 1986
12. Charybdis and Scylla (カリブデとシーラ, Karibude to Shīra)
BBC Date-30 January 1986
13. Double planet (ダブル惑星, Daburu wakusei)
BBC Date-6 February 1986
14. Circe (シルセ, Shiruse)
BBC Date-13 February 1986
15. Minotauros (ミノタウロス, Minotaurosu)
20 February 1986
16. Siren (シレーヌ, Shirēnu)
27 February 1986
17. The Black Magician (ブラック・マジシャン, Burakku Majishan)
BBC Date-6 March 1986
18. The Second Ark (第2の箱船, Dai ni no hakobune)
BBC Date-13 March 1986
19. Nereus (ネレー, Nerē)
BBC Date-20 March 1986
20. Atlas (アトラス, Atorasu)
BBC Date-27 March 1986
21. The Rebels of Lemnos (レムノスの反逆者, Remunosu no hangyakusha)
BBC Date-3 April 1986
22. Machine planet (機械惑星, Kikai wakusei)
BBC Date-10 April 1986
23. Calypso (カリプソ, Karipuso)
BBC Date-17 April 1986
24. Ulysses vs Ulysses (ユリス対ユリス, Yurisu tai Yurisu)
BBC Date-24 April 1986
25. Lotophage (ロトファージュ, Rotofāju)
BBC Date-1 May 1986
26. Hades (アデス, Adesu)
BBC Date-8 May 1986
