= Dotakon =

Japanese anime series

めちゃっこドタコン (Mechakko Dotakon)
- Genre: Comedy
- Anime television series
- Directed by: Takeshi Shirato
- Music by: Shunsuke Kikuchi
- Studio: Kokusai Eiga-sha
- Original network: Fuji TV
- Original run: 4 April 1981 – 10 October 1981
- Episodes: 28

Dotakon (めちゃっこドタコン, Mechakko Dotakon), also known as Mechanical Boy Dotakon and Robot boy Dotakon, is a comedy anime television series produced by Kokusai Eiga-sha, which was directed by Takeshi Shirato and was first broadcast on Fuji TV in 1981.
