= Hal Adelquist =

American animator (1914–1981)

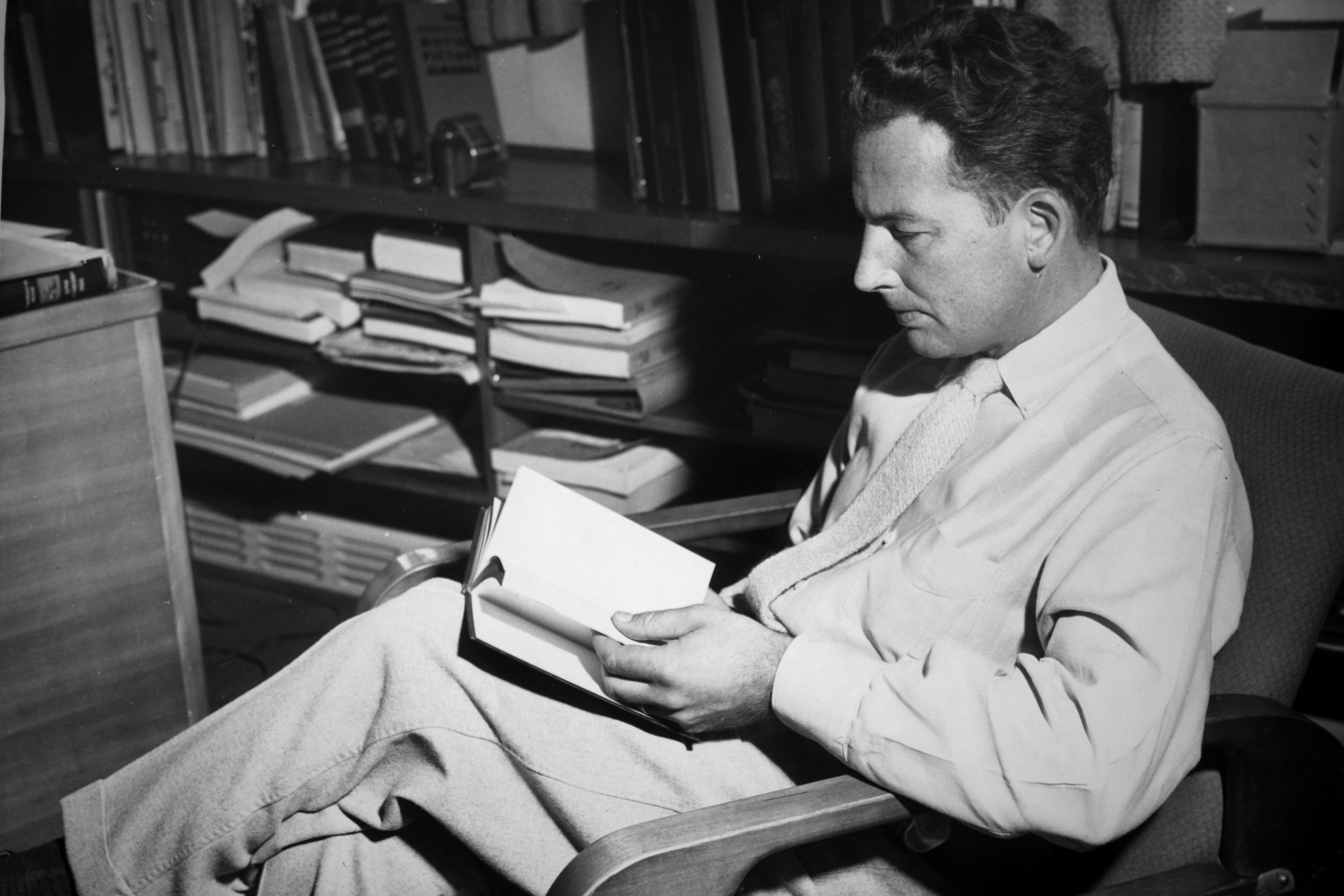
Hal Adelquist at work

Hal Adelquist (July 11, 1914 – March 26, 1981) was an American animator, storyboard writer, animation and TV producer primarily known for his work in helping to create and produce The Mickey Mouse Club, which began running as an ABC television series in 1955. Along with producer Bill Walsh, and others at the behest of Walt Disney, the show was created and Adelquist was credited as an associate producer for several of the episodes where he served as right-hand man to Walsh.

== Career ==
Adelquist's ideas helped create the show from early conception to the first year, and he ensured that the series met production schedules. Adelquist also had served under Disney prior to the Mickey Mouse Club show as head assistant director on Disney's "Snow White and the Seven Dwarfs." Adelquist started with Disney as an animator and later was promoted to "middle" management. Early in his career he served as an animator, then worked in the personnel department, and then was put in charge of the story department. One of his more notable tasks was to serve as a liaison between Walt Disney and his famous "Nine Old Men" of animation. It was later revealed by famous animator, Ward Kimball, in a 1980s interview with Michael Barrier, that the animators had chosen Hal as their spokesperson, even though by position he was studio management. Adelquist was demoted to "talent scout" in 1956 after working tirelessly to get the Mickey Mouse Club show off the ground. Shortly thereafter he resigned, never to work at Disney again.

== Personal life ==
Harold Williams Adelquist was born in Salt Lake City, Utah, on July 11, 1914. His father, an accountant, came from a family of Swedish immigrants living in Iowa, while his mother, Francis Williams, was from Utah. The family relocated to California before 1920, and eventually settled in Los Angeles where he attended Los Angeles High School. After graduating in 1932 he went to work for Disney Studios that very year. He later married and had two daughters. Harold Williams Adelquist died March 26, 1981, in Long Beach, California.

== Other reading ==
- Walt Disney: The Triumph of the American Imagination by Neal Gabler (page 94)
- 140 All-Time Must-See Movies for Film Lovers by John Howard Reid (page 206, credit: assistant director, Hal Adelquist, Snow White and the Seven Dwarfs)
- Funnybooks: The Improbable Glories of the Best American Comic Books by Michael Barrier (Page 373, Hal Adelquist memo to Walt Disney)
- Walt Disney and Assorted Other Characters: An Unauthorized Account of the Early Years at Disney's by Jack Kinney (Jack Kinney#cite note-2)
- Hal Adelquist with Walt Disney photo (Getty Images Editorial Archive):
