= Tianjin Crafts and Arts Professional College =

Art school in Tianjin, China

Coordinates: 39°06′04″N 117°09′53″E

- 天津工艺美术职业学院
- Former names: Tianjin Art and Design Academy; Tianjin Art And Craft Fine Arts Design Institute; Tianjin Crafts and Arts Vocational College
- Type: Public
- Established: 1959
- President: Sun Jingzhong
- Academic staff: 200
- Students: 1,500 full-time
- Location: Tianjin, China
- Campus: urban
- Colors
- Website: Official website (in Chinese)

Tianjin Crafts and Arts Professional College (TCAPC; Chinese: 天津工艺美术职业学院; pinyin: Gōngyì Měishù Zhíyè Xuéyuàn), commonly known as Tianjin Art and Design Academy, is a public tertiary education institute based in Tianjin on mainland China.

== History ==
The College was founded in 1959 in the name of "Tianjin Art and Design Academy" and was later known as the Tianjin Crafts and Arts Vocational College.
