= Little Women (1981 TV series) =

Japanese anime television series

- The March sisters, clockwise from lower right: Jo, Amy, Beth, and Meg.

若草の四姉妹 (Wakakusa no Yon Shimai)
- Genre: Romance, school
- Anime television series
- Directed by: Kazuya Miyazaki
- Produced by: Juzo Tsubota
- Written by: Eiichi Imado
- Music by: Takeo Watanabe
- Studio: Toei Animation; Kokusai Eiga-sha
- Original network: Tokyo Channel 12
- Original run: April 7, 1981 – September 29, 1981
- Episodes: 26

Little Women, also known as Little Women's Four Sisters (若草の四姉妹, Wakakusa no Yon Shimai) or From "Little Women Story": Little Women's Four Sisters (「若草物語」より 若草の四姉妹, "Wakakusa Monogatari" Yori: Wakakusa no Yon Shimai), is a 1981 Japanese animated television series adaptation of Louisa May Alcott's 1868-69 two-volume novel Little Women. The series is directed by Kazuya Miyazaki (a veteran Toei director whose credits included Cutie Honey and UFO Robo Grendizer among others) and produced by Toei Animation for the Kokusai Eiga-sha (Movie International) company.

The series was produced as a follow-up to a TV special based on Alcott's novel the previous year by the same animation studio. The TV series character designs differ slightly of those of the TV special; Jo, for example, while she is blonde in both versions, has curled hair rather than straight hair in the TV series.

This series is sometimes confused with Nippon Animation's 1987 World Masterpiece Theater TV series Tales of Little Women, as both series were dubbed in English and broadcast on U.S. cable TV in the 1980s (the 1981 series on CBN, and the 1987 series on HBO). In addition, both TV series share a voice actress: Keiko Han, who plays Beth in this TV series, and Meg in the 1987 series.

== Characters ==
Jo (ジョー, Jō)
Voiced by: Mami Koyama
Meg (メグ, Megu)
Voiced by: Yuko Takagi
Beth (ベス, Besu)
Voiced by: Keiko Han
Amy (エミー, Emī)
Voiced by: Chiyoko Kawashima
Father (父, Chichi)
Voiced by: Takashi Tanaka
Mother (母, Haha)
Voiced by: Akiko Tsuboi
Hannah (ハンナ, Hanna)
Voiced by: Nana Yamaguchi
Lawrence (ローレンス, Rōrensu)
Voiced by: Yonehiko Kitagawa
Laurie (ローリー, Rōrī)
Voiced by: Tsubasa Shioya
Narrator (ナレーター, Narētā)
Voiced by: Taeko Nakanishi

== Production ==
=== Staff ===
- Series director: Kazuya Miyazaki
- Script: Eiichi Imado
- Character designs: Joji Kikuchi
- Animation directors: Joji Kikuchi, Takeshi Shirado
- Backgrounds: Tadami Shimokawa

=== Music ===
- Openings
1. "Where There's Happiness" (しあわせさがして, Shiawase Sagashite)
  - April 7, 1981 – September 29, 1981
  - Lyricist: Jun Takita / Composer: Takeo Watanabe / Arranger: Yushi Matsuyama / Singers: Mitsue Kondo
  - Episodes: 1-26
- Endings
1. "Jo's Dream" (ジョーの夢, Jō no Yume)
  - April 7, 1981 – September 29, 1981
  - Lyricist: Juzo Tsubota, Jun Takita / Composer: Takeo Watanabe / Arranger: Yushi Matsuyama / Singers: Mitsue Kondo
  - Episodes: 1-26

== Broadcast ==
This TV series aired on Tokyo Channel 12 from April 7 to September 29, 1981, totaling 26 episodes. It aired from 18:00 to 18:30 on Tuesdays. While this series has been released on VHS, it has not been released on DVD in Japan due to the original film negatives being damaged.

No.	Title	Original release date
1	"Christmas Eve in the March House"; Transliteration: "Māchi Ka no Kurisumasu Ibu" (Japanese: マーチ家のクリスマスイブ)	April 7, 1981
The episode starts with the 4 sisters. Meg, Amy, Beth and Jo, who after receiving money from their aunt march decide to something from themselves. But they give it all away, to have a pair of shiny indoor slippers for their marmee.
2	"Angels in Boots"; Transliteration: "Nagagutsu wo Haita Tenshi" (Japanese: 長靴をはいた天使)	April 14, 1981
The march family take their breakfast to nearby hummel family so that they could have something to eat. The children there call the sisters angels in boots for this charity. After that, the sisters arrange a play for the entertainment of the nearby folks. Seeing all this, their neighbour, Mr Lawrence, decides to donate dinner so that the harworking sisters get something as a reward for their charity.
3	"Jo's Boyfriend"; Transliteration: "Jō no Bōifurendo" (Japanese: ジョーのボーイフレンド)	April 21, 1981
Jo visits Mr. Lawrence and his grandson Theodore Lawrence, who is the same age as jo. They hit it off and the neighbours become close playmates, friends, advisors and confidantes. But beth is still afraid of mr. lawrence even though the newly furbished piano of the lawrence household enchants her.
4	"Beth's Transformation"; Transliteration: "Besu no Henshin" (Japanese: ベスの変身)	April 28, 1981
Mr. Lawrence make an effort to have beth ease into playing the piano in his house, per the wishes of marmee. So, while the shy beth plays the piano, no one, not even servants can be around that room. To express her gratitude beth makes the old man a nice pair of slippers. After receiving which, Mr. Lawrence becomes so grateful that he sends the entire piano to the march's home. This makes beth finally let go of the shy self and thank mr. lawrence openly.
5	"Stuck-up Amy's Expulsion Incident"; Transliteration: "Kidori-ya Emī no Taigaku Jiken" (Japanese: 気取り屋エミーの退学事件)	May 5, 1981
After borrowing some cents to buy some bitter lemons to give to her classmates, amy gets revealed to her strict homeroom teacher, after one jealous girl snitched on her. After getting harsh punishment she decides to quit school for a while and the teacher gets harsh letter delivered to him by a furious Jo. But later at night, marmee does tell amy to take this moment in heart and understand the lesson to not be vain anymore.
6	"Confrontation: Jo VS Amy"; Transliteration: "Tairitsu: Jō Tai Emī" (Japanese: 対立・ジョーVSエミー)	May 12, 1981
This episode covers the infamous jo vs amy momentary conflict. Angered because Jo didn't take her to a play where Laurie's going to be; amy then proceeds to burn every single page from Jo's freshly made short story manuscript. Jo got pretty angry and stopped talking to Amy. Guiltridden amy goes to apologise to Jo in the ice rink but falls through the ice. Laurie barely saves her, but she's bedridden for days. In that moment jo decides to never to let anger cloud her decisions.
7	"Dance at the Lawrence Home"; Transliteration: "Rōrensu Ka no Budōkai" (Japanese: ローレンス家の舞踏会)	May 19, 1981
The four sisters go to Laurie's ball where some ladies ridicule them for having poorly looking clothes. Later on, Mr.Davies the teacher begs the marchatriarch to let amy return to school otherwise he would be expelled. Amy then gets coaxed by her entire family to return to school & she does.
8	"Meg Caught in a Trap"; Transliteration: "Wana ni Hamatta Megu" (Japanese: 罠にはまったメグ)	May 26, 1981
Meg wants to join the high society parties but she regrets it due to the instant gossiping and scheming. later Laurie saves her from all that on the insistence of Jo. Meg swears to both her mother and sister never to be vain again.
9	"Editorial Meeting in the Attic"; Transliteration: "Yaneura no Henshū Kaigi" (Japanese: 屋根裏の編集会議)	June 2, 1981
The sisters routinely arrange an editorial meeting where they talk about which article to include in their family newspaper. In one of such meetings, Laurie is accepted as a new member, whereby he decides immediately to have a shared postal box between the two neighbours, so any one of the party can give away gifts to the other, which would resultantly enhance bond of the two families.
10	"Jo's Cooking Duty"; Transliteration: "Jō no Ryōri Tōban" (Japanese: ジョーの料理当番)	June 9, 1981
The summer vacation has started and Mrs. March has decided to make this opportunity to teach the sisters a lesson whereby they learn not to always go after their hobbies which become boring after a while but also work for the sake of one's heart's content and enjoying free time.
11	"Picnic"; Transliteration: "Pikunikku" (Japanese: ピクニック)	June 16, 1981
Lauri has invited all the four sisters to a picnic, where Mr. Brooke saves an enslaved african-american escalping from slavers. He didn't stay long, thanked them and went toward canada. This event remindes all the four sisters that among all this fun, they haven't much written to their father, so after a light scolding from their mother they go to writing letters to their father after a long time.
12	"Laurie's Troubles"; Transliteration: "Rōrī no Nayami" (Japanese: ローリーの悩み)	June 23, 1981
Laurie sees the march sisters going on pingrom's pass and he joins them. There he joins them & they all exchange their dream for the future. Lauries especially feels with his own dream & the dream his grandpa has for him. Later at home, seeing his grandpa cry to Elisabeth's piano tunes, he decides to devote his life for the dream of his grandpa & not put much thought for his own dream.
13	"A Group of Refugees"; Transliteration: "Nanmin no Mure" (Japanese: 難民の群れ)	June 30, 1981
In an emotionally charged episode, Laurie, Meg & Jo save a couple of escaping ex-slaves from devious slavers & shoo them away with the Boston army.
14	"Beth and the Canary"; Transliteration: "Besu to Kanariya" (Japanese: ベスとカナリヤ)	July 7, 1981
Elisabeth's pet canary dies & she becomes devastated. Mr. Lawrence cheers her up & then all of them attend pipy's funeral.
15	"Jo's Secret"; Transliteration: "Jō no Himitsu" (Japanese: ジョーの秘密)	July 14, 1981
Jo is finally trying to publish her own short story in a news paper and for that she's keeping it a secret. But Laurie finds out about it and then he divulges one of his secrets to jo, that Mr. Brooke is secretly in love with Meg. This fact infuriates Jo but she temporarily finds happiness one her submitted does become a published one in the local newspaper.
16	"Meg is Now an Adult"; Transliteration: "Otona ni Natta Megu" (Japanese: おとなになったメグ)	July 21, 1981
More good news for Jo, as another one of her stories get published in Washington or New York based newspapers securing her in income stream. With this reality before her, she starts to think about the future and soon becomes sad about the fact that Meg decidedly becoming an adult and soon will be married to supposedly Mr. Brooke. Not just her all her other sisters will be going in their own path. After telling all this to her marmee, Mrs. March tells her to prepare for the future and stop having a kid mind all the time.
17	"Mrs. March Chooses a Foster Daughter"; Transliteration: "Māchi Oba-san no Yōjo Erabi" (Japanese: マーチ伯母さんの養女選び)	July 28, 1981
The lonely aunt march wants to adopt one of the sisters, but Mrs. March refuses. Rather she agrees cyclically work all 4 of the sisters in her nearby house to help with the loneliness.
18	"The Field Hospital Raised in Town"; Transliteration: "Machi ni Dekita Yasen Byōin" (Japanese: 町にできた野戦病院)	August 4, 1981
With the defeat at fredericksburg lots of injured union soldiers are coming March's homestead where thay have taken refuge to heal in Amy's school, which has been closed for some time. Jo decides to volunteer there, as her mum is there too. There she has a terrific experience.
19	"Lawrence's Tales of Old Times"; Transliteration: "Rōrensu-san no Mukashi Banashi" (Japanese: ローレンスさんの昔ばなし)	August 11, 1981
Jo finds their grandftaher's old diary from 40 years ago and she starts reading it; while wondering about what her ancestors were. To better inquire about it, they went to Mr. Lawrence and the conversation quickly side-lined Laurie's past and future. It all ended with Grandpa Lawrence and Laurie reconciling their conflict about his future fully.
20	"Jo's Fantasy"; Transliteration: "Jō no Fantajī" (Japanese: ジョーのファンタジー)	August 18, 1981
Jo is making a story and his sisters help her in giving additions to it.
21	"Jo's Fantasy 2"; Transliteration: "Jō no Fantajī Tsū" (Japanese: ジョーのファンタジー2)	August 25, 1981
One day, it's raining outside and all the March sisters go to Laurie and Mr. Brooke for a jolly story making time and have a great time.
22	"Ominous Telegram"; Transliteration: "Fukitsuna Denpō" (Japanese: 不吉な電報)	September 1, 1981
Dire news comes from the frontlines, it's that Mr. March has fallen really injured to battle injuries and Mrs. March decides to go. Mr. Brooke goes with her. Before the train leaves the station Jo comes with an almost shaven head as she had cut her hair and sold it to wig makers to give her marmee extra dollars.
23	"Don't Die Beth"; Transliteration: "Besu Shinanai de" (Japanese: ベス死なないで)	September 8, 1981
Beth gets sick from the recently dead hummel child of scarlet fever. Every family member ends up in misery, Amy is sent away and Jo takes it upon her to treat until their mother returns.
24	"Angel's Lullaby"; Transliteration: "Tenshi no Komoriuta" (Japanese: 天使の子守唄)	September 15, 1981
Beth's condition worsens and she starts to mumble. In that moment, Jo starts to reciting to her a lulluby, angel's lulluby. Fortunately, her conditions stables, just in time for marmee to return and see her.
25	"Amy's Will"; Transliteration: "Emī no Igonjō" (Japanese: エミーの遺言状)	September 22, 1981
While waiting for Élisabeth to get better, Amy prepares a will for her, seeing Aunt March do the same dedicating her jewels to her. Later on, as Beth gets fine & Amy is reunited with them, Marmee gets telegram that they're father coming on new year's eve
26	"Spring in Concord"; Transliteration: "Konkōdo no Haru" (Japanese: コンコードの春)	September 29, 1981
Father March comes back to see all his dear family members again & Meg gets engaged to John Brooke.

== See also ==
- Little Women (1987 TV series), Nippon Animation's adaptation of Louisa May Alcott's novel.
