= Enchanted Journey =

- Region 0 DVD cover (2003)
- Directed by: Hideo Nishimaki; Yakikoto Higuchi
- Screenplay by: Yasuo Tanami
- Based on: Gurikku no Bōken by Atsuo Saitō
- Produced by: Kiichirou Nohara
- Starring: Yū Mizushima; Kōsei Tomita; Rihoko Yoshida; Takeshi Aono; Yōko Asagami
- Cinematography: Yoshihiro Kessoku
- Edited by: Kazuo Inoue
- Music by: Reijiro Koroku
- Production company: Studio Korumi
- Release dates: July 21, 1981 (Japan); July 1986 (United States)
- Running time: 85 minutes
- Country: Japan
- Language: Japanese

Enchanted Journey, released in Japan as Gurikku no Bōken (グリックの冒険; lit. The Adventures of Glikko), is a 1981 Japanese anime film directed by Hideo Nishimaki and based on the book of the same name by Atsuo Saitō.

== Plot ==
Glikko is a domestically raised chipmunk who lives in an apartment with his sister, Fluff. However, all that changed when a carrier pigeon named Pippo tells Glikko about the chipmunks living in the vast North Forest. Glikko is convinced that the Forest is his true home, but Fluff refuses to believe it. The next morning, Pippo returns and warns Glikko about the dangers on his journey, such as foxes and hawks. The two are stalked by the neighbor's cat and it attacks them, but it misses and flees. Pippo thinks it's impossible for Glikko to make it on his own, but Glikko insists on going. Fluff makes an escape for Glikko and he escapes by flying through the city with their owner's hat.

The following night, he encounters a sewer rat named Gamba and saves him from an approaching car. Gamba offers Glikko to help him fight a gang of house rats with his friends. Glikko and the sewer rats win the battle and they throw a party. The next morning, Gamba wakes up Glikko and leads him to his destination, only to discover a zoo instead.

Glikko meets up with a chipmunk named Zipzip and he tells him the tales of the vast North Forest. He also meets up with a female chipmunk named Nono, who is also eager to go to the North Forest. Glikko leaves the zoo and Nono follows. Glikko refuses to let her come at first, but Nono tells him that she was taken to the zoo and he reluctantly agrees to have her along. The next morning, they feast upon an persimmon tree and are attacked by a black cat guarding the tree. Nono hurts her leg badly and Glikko manages to escape. Glikko goes out looking for her and eventually manages to find her.

The next morning, the two chipmunks plan to cross the fields to reach the mountains, but Nono suddenly catches a fever. Glikko tries to help her, but Nono admonishes him and orders him to leave. However, Glikko returns with a stack of acorns and he reminds her that he'll still be with her no matter what. The next morning, they encounter a hibernating squirrel, who flirts with Nono before getting snatched by a hawk. The two try to escape, but they notice the hawk patrolling the area. Glikko distracts the hawk by leading it into a thicket and celebrates their victory, but Nono knows that the hawk may return someday.

Eventually, they notice the mountains and find a boat during a storm. The boat starts to drift away in a river and Glikko sings "We're on our way, Nono" before eventually reaching the oceans the next morning. They play around in the shore and notice the mountains. They make it to the mountains, but they notice that winter is coming. The hawk comes and attacks the two chipmunks, but a fox intervenes and battles with the hawk, allowing the chipmunks to escape. The fox kills the hawk and looks ominously in the chipmunks' direction. The following night, the chipmunks notice the forest and head out. The next day, during a snowstorm, Nono tells Glikko her story about how she and her mother were captured by humans and brought to a zoo, which resulted in her mother's death. Nono starts to become weak and complains about how they aren't gonna reach the forest, but Glikko heads out and finds some tree bark, unaware that the fox is stalking them.

The next morning, the two chipmunks continue their journey and Pippo arrives and tells them that they've finally reached the North Forest. They arrive at the Forest and meet the other chipmunks living there. Pippo then notices the fox approaching them, having followed Glikko and Nono. The other chipmunks flee in terror from the beast while Glikko tries to fend him off. Nono and Pippo intervene, but are vicious battled aside. Both of them survive and the fox pursues Glikko to the edge of a cliff. Across the gulf was Glikko's only salvation; the other side of the ravine. The other chipmunks, looking on, called for their friend to jump. Glikko finally leaped, just as the fox did too, snapping the branch. The fox's claws raked across Glikko's back in midair, but only succeeded in tearing Glikko's bandanna. Glikko made it safely across while the chipmunks' most dreaded enemy fell victim to gravity. Glikko survives and the chipmunks cheer as they prepare a feast. Pippo decides to return to the city and Glikko requests him to tell Fluff about the Forest. Pippo then flies off as the chipmunks wave goodbye to him. The camera then cuts to the forest now empty and covered with snow before spring returns.

== Cast ==
Japanese voice actor	English voice actor	Character
Yuu Mizushima	Lionel Wilson	Glikko
Youko Asagami	Corinne Orr	Nono
Kousei Tomita	Orson Welles	Pippo
Takeshi Aono	Jim Backus	Gamba
Rihoko Yoshida	Lois Brandt	Fluff
Kaneta Kimotsuki	Jack Grimes	Zipzip
Youko Asagami	Lois Brandt	Nono's Mother
Kenichi Ogata	Peter Fernandez	Northern Squirrel
Takeshi Aono	Pierre Cache	House Rats
Kousei Tomita	George Spelvin	Elderly Chipmunk

== Production and release ==
The Enchanted Journey is based on the book by Atsuo Saitō, originally published in 1970. The film was produced by Studio Korumi, and released in Japanese theaters on July 21, 1981. In the United States, an English-dubbed version with the voices of Jim Backus and Orson Welles aired on the HBO network (in July 1986), and on the Family Channel (in March 1996). This version was released on VHS by Hi-Tops Video several months after the HBO airing.

Date	Producer	Distributor	Country	Media	Languages
1981-07-01	Studio Korumi		Japan	(premier)	Ja
1986-07		HBO	United States	TV broadcast	En
1986		Hi-Tops Video	United States	VHS	En
1996-03		The Family Channel	United States	TV broadcast	En
1997-03-01			Japan	VHS/LD	Ja
2003		Blast Films	United States	DVD	En
2004-01-06		Vintage Home Entertainment		DVD	
