= Space Warrior Baldios =

Japanese anime television series

- Screenshot of Baldios

宇宙戦士 バルディオス (Uchū Senshi Barudiosu)
- Genre: science fiction, mecha
- Anime television series
- Directed by: Kazuyuki Hirokawa
- Written by: Akiyoshi Sakai
- Music by: Kentarō Haneda
- Studio: Ashi Productions; Kokusai Eiga-sha
- Licensed by: NA: Discotek Media
- Original network: Tokyo Channel 12
- Original run: June 30, 1980 – January 25, 1981
- Episodes: 34 (Note: The last 3 episodes were never broadcast on Japanese television.)
- Anime film
- Directed by: Hisayuki Toriumi; Kazuyuki Hirokawa
- Written by: Akiyoshi Sakai
- Music by: Kentarō Haneda
- Studio: Ashi Productions; Kokusai Eiga-sha
- Licensed by: NA: Discotek Media
- Released: December 29, 1981
- Runtime: 120 minutes

Space Warrior Baldios (宇宙戦士 バルディオス, Uchū Senshi Barudiosu) is a 1980 Japanese super robot mecha anime. A film with the same title was released on December 19, 1981. In North America, the series and movie are licensed by Discotek Media and the series is currently streaming on Crunchyroll. The anime television series was produced by Ashi Productions and Kokusai Eiga-sha however, the show was cancelled. In 1981, a feature film distributed by Toei Company was produced featuring footage from the TV series as well as newly animated footage to properly conclude the series. The TV series was released in Italy as Baldios - Il Guerriero dello Spazio and in Spain as Los guerreros del espacio (The Space Warriors). The series is considered as a popular cult classic worldwide and universally regarded as one of the best works of the genre.

== Story ==
The TV series begins on S-1 (Sol One), a futuristic world whose radiation and pollution has forced its occupants to live underground. Its emperor is assassinated by military fanatic Zeo Gattler and his followers, who frame the team of scientists who recently found a solution to their planet's environmental decay. Gattler's followers invade the head scientist's laboratory, killing the environmentalists and destroying their work.

Gattler loads the civilian population aboard a fortress, the Argor, and flies off to conquer a new planet in the galaxy. Angered by Gattler's devious actions, the lead scientist's son (protagonist Marin Reigan) tries to escape. Before he can, he is caught in the Argor's warp drive system, as well as a mysterious space disturbance, and finds himself on the moon of the Earth in the year 2100.

When he sees a Martian colony destroyed by Gattler's Aldebaran Army, Marin joins the military organization "Blue Fixer Secret" (BFS). His ship, Pulsar Burn, has the capability to travel inside the "Subspace" (a transdimensional world) and thus is picked to become the main component of Blue Fixer's mecha, the giant and powerful robot Baldios. Marin and the Blue Fixer team (Jamie Hoshino, combat pilots Jack Oliver and Raita Hokuto, researcher Ella Quinstein and commander Takeshi Tsukikage) defend Earth against Gattler and the S-1 force. The series is also based upon the love-hate relationship between Marin and Rosa Aphrodia, Gattler's first commander and ruthless killer.

The conflict ends when Gattler and Aldebaran trigger a massive tsunami by melting Earth's polar ice caps with artificial suns, flooding the planet and killing millions. Blue Fixer is helpless to stop it, and Marin watches the waves in horror. Marin and the rest of the Blue Fixers, Gattler, and Aphrodia are the only ones to realize that, after the flood, Earth resembles S-1 because it's indeed the same planet. That's because the Aldebaran Army and Marin accidentally traveled back in time, and resurfaced into S-1's ancient past (2100s Earth), without recognizing the planet and the solar system. In the unfinished episodes, Aphrodia dies fighting against her former soldiers and the final confrontation between Blue Fixer and Aldebaran occurs near Saturn. Baldios destroys the Argor ship, but nuclear missiles are accidentally activated by Gattler, and the surface of Earth is engulfed by nuclear explosions, while Raita dies. Marin goes to confront Gattler while the rest of the Blue Fixer wait underground with the survivors, before leaving and crash landing back on Earth to find his way back to the shelters. The Earthlings survive, and one day it will evolve into the S-1 civilization. The timeline is fixed, and it's a closed loop.

The Baldios film contains a similar final confrontation between Marin and Gattler, where Aphrodia shoots Gattler before collapsing and being carried by Marin. Marin comes back to Earth with her, now doomed to generate the civilization of S-1.

== Video games ==
Baldios would make its video game debut in the Super Robot Wars franchise, specifically 2008's Super Robot Wars Z for the PlayStation 2. Baldios would appear in the game's two part sequel, 2nd Super Robot Wars Z (Hakai Hen and Saisei Hen) as well as the 2015 mobile game, Super Robot Wars X-Ω.

For this appearance Marin was voiced by Takumi Yamazaki as his original voice actor Kaneto Shiozawa had died in 2000.
