= Kyoufu Densetsu Kaiki! Frankenstein =

1981 anime television film by Yugo Serikawa

- Cover art for the film.
- 恐怖伝説 怪奇！フランケンシュタイン
- Screenplay by: Akiyoshi Sakai
- Directed by: Yugo Serikawa
- Music by: Kentaro Haneda
- Country of origin: Japan
- Original language: Japanese

Production
- Producers: Yoshiaki Koizumi (TV Asahi); Toshio Katsuta; Takeyuki Suzuki
- Running time: 98 minutes
- Production companies: TV Asahi; Toei Animation

Original release
- Network: ANN (TV Asahi)
- Release: July 27, 1981

Kyoufu Densetsu Kaiki! Frankenstein (Japanese: 恐怖伝説 怪奇！フランケンシュタイン), is a 1981 Japanese anime monster movie television film, loosely based on Mary Shelley's 1818 novel Frankenstein; or, The Modern Prometheus and the Marvel comic book Monster of Frankenstein. In this 98-minute violent, adult-oriented film, the creature was portrayed as a misunderstood monster, who only wanted to be loved. The film was dubbed and released in the U.S. in 1984. The dubbed version never had a title but was advertised as both The Monster of Frankenstein and Frankenstein Legend of Terror.

== Plot ==
In 1860, Victor Frankenstein and his partner Zuckel jointly create Frankenstein's monster. The monster attacks the assistant and falls from a cliff. Assuming the monster is dead, Victor returns to his wife Elizabeth and daughter Emily. A police inspector named Bellbeau investigates some mysterious mutilations and killings, and Victor is blackmailed by his former assistant, who lost an eye in his fight with the monster.

Victor grows more and more paranoid, having terrifying nightmares about his creature, believing him to be pure evil. The monster survived his fall, and stole clothes and food from the villagers, whom he killed in his confusion, including Zuckel. Victor's daughter, Emily, spends time with her grandfather, a wise blind man who warned his son Victor about his experiments. When the monster finds his way to the grandfather's cabin, he becomes good friends with Emily and the old man, because they can see that he only wants to be loved, and they give him the name Franken.

Victor wanted to rid himself of all the evidence of his experiments, so he decided to hunt the monster down and shoot him. From Emily, the monster learns about God. When a fire breaks out in the woods, Emily's mother is killed, and Franken can only rescue Emily's grandfather. When Philip tries to shoot Franken, he is accidentally killed by the monster.

Emily thinks Franken did it on purpose and shoots his hand, and Franken is once again alone. He seeks refuge in a church, where gazes upon the crucifix, and notices that both Jesus Christ and himself has a hole though their hands, he breaks into tears, and begs God for forgiveness. Victor believes that his creation killed his wife, he finds him in the church, but Franken escapes.

The grandfather tells Emily that it was not Franken's fault that her mother died, and she sets out to find him. At the mountains, Inspector Bellbeau and his police force open fire on the monster. Emily comes to his rescue, and for the first time, Franken speaks her name. Tired of a life he never wanted, the monster commits suicide by throwing himself off of a cliff. Victor, driven mad by all the terror he caused, shoots himself in the chest. Inspector Bellbeau visits Franken's grave, as the red scarf Emily gave the monster blows away in the wind while Emily now lives with her grandfather.

== Home media ==
The movie was released on VHS in 1984 by Vestron Video. Deaf Crocodile announced that they would be releasing a 4K restoration of the movie on Blu-Ray, under the title Frankenstein, Legend of Terror, in 2026.

== See also ==
- Lists of animated feature films
