= Edo period in popular culture =

The Edo period of the history of Japan is the setting of many works of popular culture. These include novels, stage plays, films, television shows, animated works, manga, and video games. Major events of the period, such as the Siege of Osaka, Shimabara Rebellion, and the decline and fall of the Tokugawa shogunate figure prominently in many works. Historical and fictional people and groups of the period, including Miyamoto Musashi, Izumo no Okuni, Yagyū Jūbei Mitsuyoshi, the fictional Isshin Tasuke, Yui Shōsetsu, Matsuo Bashō, Tokugawa Mitsukuni (Mito Kōmon), Ōoka Tadasuke, Tōyama Kagemoto (Tōyama no Kin-san), the Forty-seven Ronin, Sakamoto Ryōma, Katsu Kaishū, and the Shinsengumi, as well as the fifteen Tokugawa shoguns were active for much or all of their public lives and are dramatized in works of popular culture. The cultural developments of the times, including kabuki, bunraku, and ukiyo-e, and practices like sankin kōtai and pilgrimages to the Ise Shrine, feature in many works set in Edo Japan.

Works set in the Edo period did not become popular until after the Meiji era. Kabuki plays in contemporary settings were known as sewamono.

Some works span multiple media. The Mito Kōmon Man'yūki (水戸黄門漫遊記) has become popular in genres as diverse as kōdan, kabuki, stage plays, novels, films, television, manga, and anime.

== Novels ==
- Mito Kōmon Man'yūki (水戸黄門漫遊記)
- Musashi by Eiji Yoshikawa
- The Teahouse Fire by Ellis Avery

‘’Silence (Endō novel)’’ by Shusaku Endo

- Shogun by James Clavell
- Teito Gendan by Hiroshi Aramata
- The Thousand Autumns of Jacob de Zoet by David Mitchell (author)

== Stage plays ==
- Pacific Overtures
- The Chaos of the Ghost Cat of Arima

== Films ==
- Ansatsu ("Assassin")
- Aragami
- Azumi
- Azumi 2: Death or Love
- Chushingura: Hana no Maki, Yuki no Maki
- Daimajin trilogy
- Hanzo the Razor series
- Harakiri
- The Hidden Blade
- Incident at Blood Pass
- Kill!
- Kurama Tengu series
- Legend of the Eight Samurai
- Lone Wolf and Cub series
- Mayonaka no Yaji-san Kita-san (Yaji and Kita: The Midnight Pilgrims)
- Mibu gishi den (When the Last Sword Is Drawn)
- Rebel Samurai
- Ronin Gai
- Red Beard
- Samurai Assassin
- Samurai Rebellion
- Samurai Spy
- Samurai Trilogy
- Samurai Wolf
- Shinobi No Mono
- Shinsengumi
- Shogun's Vault
- Sword of Desperation
- Sword of Doom
- Sword of the Beast
- Sanjuro
- Seven Samurai
- Shogun Assassin
- Shogun's Shadow
- Tange Sazen series
- Tasogare Seibei (Twilight Samurai)
- The 47 Ronin
- When the Last_Sword Is Drawn
- Yagyu Ichizoku no Imbo
- Yojimbo
- Zatoichi film series
- Dancing skeleton

== Television ==
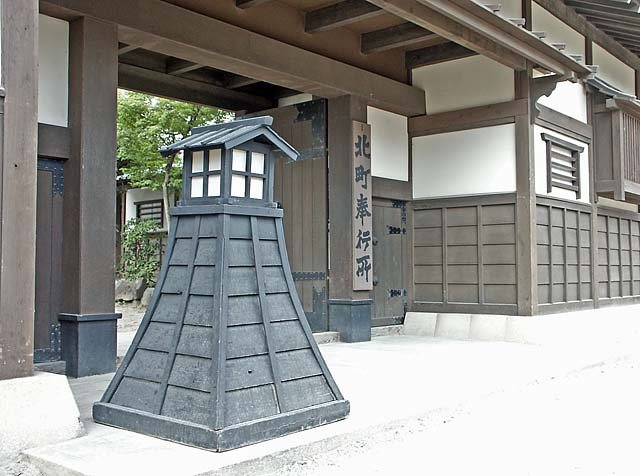
Kita Machi Bugyō-sho, Toei Uzumasa Studios

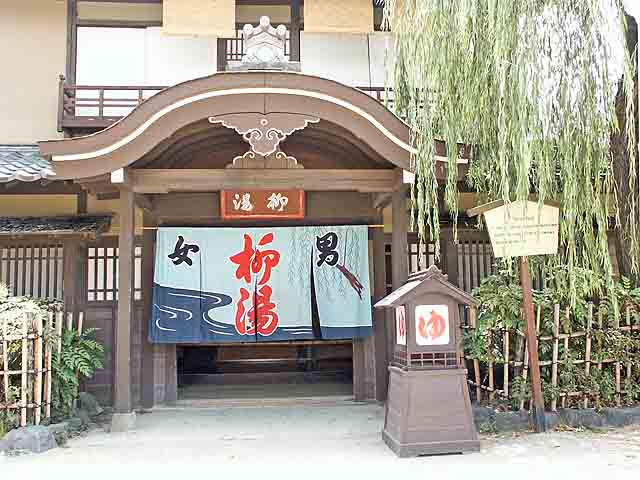
Sento, Toei Uzumasa Studios

- Abarenbo Shogun
- Blue Eye Samurai
- Chōshichirō Edo Nikki
- Edo no Taka: Goyôbeya Hankachô (Falcons of Edo)
- Edo o Kiru
- Gokenin Zankurō
- Hissatsu series
- Jitte-nin
- Kage Dōshin
- Kage no Gundan (Shadow Warriors)
- Kenkaku Shōbai
- Lone Wolf and Cub - a live-actor television series based on the manga
- Mito Kōmon
- Moeyo Ken
- Momotarō-zamurai
- Ōedo Sōsamō
- Onihei Hanka-chō
- Onmitsu Kenshi (The Samurai)
- Ōoka Echizen
- Samurai Champloo
- Sanbiki ga Kiru!
- Shinsen gumi Keppūroku
- Shogun Iemitsu Shinobi Tabi
- Taiga drama (NHK annual series)
- Tenamon'ya Sando-gasa
- Tenga Dōdō
- Tenga Gomen
- Tōyama no Kin-san
- Westworld (Shōgunworld)
- Ude ni Oboe ga Aru
- Zatoichi (television series)
- Zenigata Heiji

== Anime & manga ==
- Amatsuki - a manga and anime in which the main character gets stuck in a virtual Edo
- Ayakashi Ayashi - an anime series taking place during the Tenpō reforms
- Bakumatsu Kikansetsu Irohanihoheto - an anime series centered around the Boshin War, with some supernatural/fantasy elements
- Basilisk
- Blade of the Immortal
- Carried by the Wind: Tsukikage Ran
- Gintama - a manga and anime series which takes place in an alternate Edo period where Edo is overrun by aliens called the Amanto.
- Hakuoki
- Hell's Paradise: Jigokuraku - A manga set in the Edo Period in which the main character went to another world for his wife.
- Kaze Hikaru
- Lone Wolf and Cub
- Manyuu Hikenchou
- Ninja Scroll
- Nurarihyon no Mago - a manga and anime in which the main character's father had ruled during the Edo period as the second supreme commander
- Ōoku: The Inner Chambers - a manga set in the Edo period in which a strange disease that only affects men has caused a massive reduction of male population
- Peacemaker Kurogane - an anime series focusing on a boy who joins the Shinsengumi
- Rurouni Kenshin
- Samurai Champloo
- The Yagyu Ninja Scrolls
- The upcoming Code Geass: Jet Black Reyna is to be set in the Edo Period
- Nabari no Ou - While not set in the Edo Period, the immortal character Kouichi Aizawa lived and gained his immortality during it.
- Oh! Edo Rocket

== Video games ==
- Ganbare Goemon - a Konami video game series that takes place in the Edo period.
- Odama - a Nintendo game that is a historical fiction in a Strategy-pinball genre.
- Hakuoki - a reverse harem otome video game the occurs towards the end of the Edo period, which also includes characters based on the Shinsengumi.
- Way of the Samurai series - a video game series that takes place in Edo as the player takes the role of a samurai
- Samurai Warriors - a video game series from Koei, using Dynasty Warriors mechanics to illustrate the beginning of the Japanese Edo period.
- Total War: Shogun 2 - a strategy video game.
- Shadow Tactics: Blades of the Shogun - a real-time tactics video game.
- Nioh
- Live A Live - a role-playing game set in multiple time periods, one chapter revolving around a shinobi rescuing Sakamoto Ryōma.
- Ryū ga Gotoku Kenzan! and Ryū ga Gotoku Ishin! - two spin-off games in the Yakuza (franchise) series, set in the Edo period. Ryū ga Gotoku Kenzan! centers on Miyamoto Musashi as the main character, and the main character of Ryū ga Gotoku Ishin! is Sakamoto Ryōma.

== See also ==
- Jidaigeki
