= Komon =

Komon may refer to:

- Leonard Patrick Komon (born 1988), Kenyan long-distance runner
- Manga Mito Kōmon, Japanese anime television series
- Mito Kōmon, Japanese jidaigeki or period drama
- A form of Kimono
