= Dorami-chan: A Blue Straw Hat =

1994 film by Toshihiko Ando

- Official poster featuring Umeboshi Denka: Uchū no Hate Kara Panparopan!
- Kanji: ドラミちゃん 青いストローハット
- Revised Hepburn: Dorami-chan Aoi Sutorō Hatto
- Directed by: Toshihiko Ando
- Screenplay by: Miho Maruo
- Based on: Doraemon by Fujiko F. Fujio
- Produced by: Sōichi Besshi; Sojiro Masuko; Yoshiaki Koizumi
- Starring: Keiko Yokozawa; Toshihiko Seki; Daisuke Gōri; Show Hayami; Naoki Tatsuta; Chie Kōjiro
- Edited by: Okayasu Promotion
- Music by: Kohei Tanaka
- Production company: Shin-Ei Animation
- Distributed by: Toho
- Release date: March 12, 1994 (Japan)
- Running time: 15 minutes
- Country: Japan
- Language: Japanese
- Box office: $21.1 million

Dorami-chan: A Blue Straw Hat (ドラミちゃん 青いストローハット, Dorami-chan Aoi Sutorō Hatto) is a 1994 Japanese animated science fiction comedy-drama short film.

It premiered in Japan on March 12, 1994 on a double feature with Doraemon: Nobita's Three Visionary Swordsmen.

The film's tagline is "The strange robot town where Dorami got lost. A Dorami-style adventure full of love and courage" (ドラミちゃんが迷い込んだ奇妙なロボットの街。愛と勇気がいっぱいのドラミチック・アドベンチャー).

== Plot ==
In 22nd-century Ginza, Tokyo, Dorami sees her reflection in a clock as a lanky purple scarecrow robot wearing a blue straw hat runs by.

The scarecrow robot picks flowers until he realizes he might be late and runs off, forgetting his bag. Dorami decides to return it, following him to the House of Mysteries, where she discovers a glowing door. Upon opening it, she is transported to a colorful fairytale dimension.

Dorami sees the scarecrow robot blocked from entering Princess Aurora's ball by three competitors Pump, Face, and Big. As he nearly falls from the bridge having been closed, she saves him with her Octo-Rescue Rod.

The scarecrow robot, Crow, tells Dorami he wishes to speak to Princess Aurora, revealing his romantic intentions. Doubting his chances as a mere scarecrow, he explains he came to the 22nd century for beautiful flowers for her. Dorami urges him not to give up and introduces herself, encouraging Crow to go see Princess Aurora.

Dorami and Crow use Takecopters to visit Princess Aurora but face challenges from Pump, who attempts to flood them with water. Dorami cleverly uses her Head-Over-Heels Necktie gadget to tie up Pump's hose, stopping the flood. When Crow struggles in the water, he accidentally helps submerge Pump. After the water recedes and they ensure Pump is incapacitated, Dorami uses a special oil spray to restore Crow, and they continue their journey to the castle.

Dorami and Crow then go through a colorful cave and find a flowery field, where they encounter Face, who reveals his powers by transforming some birds and butterflies into stone. Horrified, they try to escape, but Dorami trips, spilling her gadgets. As Face attacks, Crow inadvertently reflects his laser with Dorami's compact mirror, turning Face into stone. Dorami praises Crow's bravery, boosting his confidence.

After the flowery field suddenly changes to a grassy land, Dorami and Crow excitedly approach Princess Aurora's castle but are stopped by a deep voice warning them. Big, now massive, threatens them, forcing Dorami to flee while searching for a gadget. Crow distracts Big with teasing, allowing Dorami to use her Lightning Lure Wand to defeat him by attracting a lightning strike.

Dorami checks on Crow, and they begin to ascend the castle tower's stairway. Suddenly, Heart, the remnant of Big, emerges as a wheel and pursues them for revenge. Crow quickly notices and shoots at the wheel, destroying it and capturing Heart, whom he then fires away from them. Dorami realizes that Heart had been controlling them previously, while Crow is determined to finally meet Princess Aurora.

Crow and Dorami reach the castle's entrance, but Crow hesitates to enter. Dorami encourages him, expressing her belief that Princess Aurora will accept him due to his growth. As Dorami tries to use a tool to open the locked door, Crow stops her and instead emphasizes that she is the better friend. They hold hands, and a bright light shines above them.

Dorami and Crow return from Princess Aurora's castle, holding hands. Dorami adjusts Crow's hat and urges him to take care of himself, to which Crow responds positively. Later, back in 22nd-century Ginza, Tokyo, Dorami looks at the same clock from earlier and sees Crow's reflection winking back at her. She turns to find him gone, but smiles and continues on her way.

== Cast ==
Character	Japanese voice actor
Dorami	Keiko Yokozawa
Crow	Toshihiko Seki
Big	Daisuke Gōri
Face	Show Hayami
Pump	Naoki Tatsuta
Heart	Chie Kōjiro

== Production ==
Dorami-chan: A Blue Straw Hat is the fourth and final theatrical Dorami-chan short film.

The film's title is derived from the blue hat of the character Crow.

The previous Dorami-chan short films used "Hello! Dorami-chan" performed by Satoko Yamano, but A Blue Straw Hat instead uses "Tomodachi Nanoni" performed by KŪKO.

Previous Doraemon films were shot in 4:3 and screened using the Masking Vista method, which involved adding black bars at the top and bottom of the screen; however, this film was the first to be shot in 16:9. It was put on hold for a while afterward until being fully implemented starting with Doraemon: Nobita's Great Adventure in the South Seas in 1998.

== Soundtrack ==
=== Theme song ===
"Tomodachi Nanoni" (友達なのに)
Lyrics: Mitsuko Shiramine / Composition: Chiho Kiyooka / Arrangement: Yuji Nomi / Vocals: KŪKO

== Release ==
Dorami-chan: A Blue Straw Hat was released in Japan on March 12, 1994. It was screened theatrically as a double feature alongside Doraemon: Nobita's Three Visionary Swordsmen.

=== Home video ===
The short has been released on VHS and DVD.

=== Television broadcasts ===
In 2013, to commemorate the release of Doraemon: Nobita's Secret Gadget Museum, TV Asahi's CS TV Asahi Channel aired Dorami-chan: A Blue Straw Hat alongside other Doraemon films such as Doraemon: Nobita's Dinosaur and Doraemon: Nobita and the Birth of Japan.

=== Streaming ===
In 2024, for the occasion of the 90th anniversary of Fujiko F. Fujio, remastered versions of Dorami-chan: A Blue Straw Hat alongside numerous animated short films of Doraemon, Perman, Esper Mami, and Chimpui were made available to stream on Prime Video Japan as the "Fujiko F. Fujio's 90th Anniversary Film Masterpiece Selection".
