= Raishin Kodama =

Japanese actor

- 児玉 頼信
- Born: May 17, 1948 (age 77); Miyazaki Prefecture, Japan
- Occupation: Actor
- Years active: 1970s–
- Agent: Takarai Project
- Height: 1.76 m (5 ft 9 in)

Raishin Kodama (児玉 頼信, Kodama Raishin; born May 17, 1948, in Miyazaki Prefecture, Japan) is a Japanese actor represented by Takarai Project. His hobbies are cooking and photography and his skills are judo, dancing buyō, and speaking Miyazaki dialect.

== Filmography ==
=== TV series ===
NHK

Title	Role	Notes
Sukitto Isshin Tasuke	Official	
Rendezvous in Black	Funeral chairman	
Shisha Kara no Tegami	Taxi driver	
Watashi no Naka no Dareka: Kaimono Isonshō no Onna-tachi		
Haru no Hatō		Taiga drama
Tatta Hitori no Hanran		
GeGeGe no Nyōbō	Relative	Asadora
1991 Unzen Fugendake: Hinan Kankoku o Keizoku Seyo	Kanichi Kanegae	
Nanatsu no Kaigi	Executive	

Nippon TV

Title	Role	Notes
Yasuko to Kenji	Tsubaki Bussan executive	

Tokyo Broadcasting System

Year	Title	Role	Notes
	Seicho Matsumoto Suspense Kuroi Gashū Shōgen		
	Wakaba no Koro		
	Otona no Otoko		
	The Doctor	Patient	
	Chiharu Saotome no Tenjō Hōkoku-sho		
	Seicho Matsumoto Tokubetsu Kikaku: Gao		
	Ikebukuro West Gate Park	Oki Mikio Deputy	
2010	Sekai de Ichiban Atsui Natsu	Minister of Justice	
	Big Wing		Episode 2
	Yoisho no Otoko	Doctor	
	Anata no Jinsei o Hakobi Shimasu	Banker	
	Moto Kare	Town chairman	
	The Eldest Boy and His Three Elder Sisters	Radio station manager	
	Kirakira Kenshui		
	Kuro Sagi		
	Tonari no Shibafu	Club guest	
2011	Spec: Keishichōkōanbu Kōan Daigoka Mishō Jiken Tokubetsu Taisaku-gakari Jiken-bo	Tube security	

Fuji Television

Year	Title	Role	Notes
	Eien no Kimi e	Assistant	
	Emergency Room 24hours	Rokuro Tani	
	Iryu		
	1 Litre no Namida		
	Rikon Bengoshi		
	The Hit Parade: Geinō-kai o Kaeta Otoko Shin Watanabe Monogatari		
	Daisuke Hanamura	Judge	
	Shinju Fujin	Takeyama executive	
	Haru-chan	Michihiro Kanai	
	Okaneganai!		Episode 1
	Mada Koi wa Hajimaranai		
	Rocket Boy		Episodes 6 and 7
	Hitotsu Yane no Shita	Raishin Kodama	Episode 11
	Yonimo Kimyōna Monogatari		
	Kin'yō Entertainment		
	Kita no Kuni Kara		
	Hakusen Nagashi		
	Ā Rikon-shiki		
	Konkatsu!		
	Kurobe no Taiyō		
	Ninkyō Helper	Ministry executive	
	Fumō Chitai	Political director	
	Tenshi no Dairinin	Hanai	
2010	Nagareboshi		
	Guilty Akuma to Keiyaku Shita Onna	Chairman	
2011	School	Kentaro Tanimoto	
2012	Kagi no Kakatta Heya	Jiro Tani	
2013	Shomuni 2013	Manten director	
2013	The Genie Family		
2014	Nobunaga Concerto	Matahachi	
2015	Keppeki-kun no Satsujin File 2	Keiji Tsuzaka	
2016	Keibuho Jotaro Sasaki	Shimofusaya shopkeeper	

TV Asahi

Year	Title	Role	Notes
1986	The Hangman V		Episode 4
1994	Ninja Sentai Kakuranger	Murata	
1995	Chōriki Sentai Ohranger	Shoichi's father	
	The Gorila 7		
	Nemurenu Yoru o Daite	General Counsel	
	On'na Futari Sōsa-kan		
1999	Hagure Keiji Junjō-ha		
	Tōfu-ya Naojirō no Ura no Kao 2		
	Nana-ri no Onna Bengoshi	Judge	
	My Girl	HR professional	
	Salaryman Kintaro	Doctor	
2005	Kisō no Onna	Sawaizo Suzuki	
2010	Kōshō Hito Tōno Maiko Saigo no Jiken	Police executive	
2011	Dr. Ichirō Irabu	Sasaki	
	Ore no Sora Keiji-hen	Tsuun president	
	Kon'yoku Rotenburo Renzoku Satsujin		
	Mune-sue Keiji no Love Affair Oyobi Mune-sue Keiji no Fukushū		
	Kogoro Akechi vs. Kosuke Kindaichi		
	Keishichō Josei Sōsahan		
	Kyotaro Nishimura Travel Mystery Tokyo Yamagata Satsujin Root	Keitaro Kuroda	
	Kyūkyū Kyūmei-shi Saori Makita	Deputy director	
2013	Kenji Yoko Asahina	Mizuta	

Broadcasting stations

Year	Title	Role	Network	Notes
	Love Long	Moriuchi	Shanghai TV	
	Kētai Keiji Zenigata	Chataro Chasawa	BS-TBS	
2008	Pandora		WOWOW	
2011	Beat		WOWOW	

Other

Title	Notes
Netagen	
Yakusoku	

=== Films ===
Title	Role	Notes	Ref.
Madadayo	Student		
Akai Tsuki			
Casshern			
Shikoku	Driver		
A Taxing Woman's Return	Shinja		
Tōki Rakujitsu	Hideto Noguchi's brother-in-law		
Swallowtail	Driver		
Dolls	Bride father		
Daikaijū Tōkyō ni arawaru			
Boku ga Shokei sa Reru Mirai	Judge		
Shin Godzilla			

=== Theater ===
Title	Notes
Shingo Jū-ban Shōbu	
Yuki no Wataridori	
Shio Iwai Mōsou	
Mitsuko	
San'nin no Hikagenokazura	
Otenbamusume Naniwa no Torimono-chō	
Chūshingura Ibun Usuzakura-ki	
Shinshun Abare Shishi	
