= Merdeka 17805 =

2001 film by Yukio Fuji

- Promotional poster
- Directed by: Yukio Fuji
- Written by: Yoshihiro Ishimatsu
- Starring: Jundai Yamada; Lola Amaria; Naoki Hosaka; Muhammad Iqbal; Aulia Achsan; Fajar Umbara; Takaaki Enoki; Koji Tsukamoto
- Cinematography: Kenji Takama
- Edited by: Akimasa Kawashima
- Music by: Ryouichi Kuniyoshi
- Production companies: Toho; Rapi Films
- Distributed by: Toho
- Release date: 12 May 2001 (Japan)
- Running time: 122 minutes
- Country: Japan
- Languages: Japanese; Indonesian
- Budget: $15 million

Merdeka 17805 (ムルデカ 17805, Murudeka 17805) is a 2001 Japanese historical propaganda war film by Yukio Fuji which depicts a Japanese soldier who arrives in the Dutch East Indies during the occupation and stays to fight in the Indonesian National Revolution. The film emphasised the Empire of Japan's role in Indonesia's independence, leading several writers to describe it as propaganda. It was also controversial in Indonesia owing to concerns of historical revisionism, because Japan's occupation of the area is depicted as the Empire protecting it from Western aggression. The film was a financial success in Japan.

== Plot ==
In early 1942, the army of the Empire of Japan occupies the Dutch East Indies and overthrows its Dutch colonial leaders. During a visit to a Javanese village, Captain Takeo Shimazaki (Jundai Yamada) and his translator Yamana (Naomasa Musaka) are told that their arrival was predicted by King Jayabaya centuries before. Touched by this pronouncement, Shimazaki promises to free the archipelago from colonialism. Later, he is assigned to sneak into the last Dutch stronghold in Bandung and negotiate the unconditional surrender of the Dutch Army, a mission he completes successfully.

With control of the archipelago assured, General Hitoshi Imamura allows the military training of the indigenous population, with promises that it will lead to Indonesian independence. Shimazaki becomes a teacher at the Seinen Dojo ("Youth School"), and his students – including Nurhadi (Muhammad Iqbal), Asep (Aulia Achsan), and Parto (Fajar Umbara) – are willing to fight to the death for the independence of their homeland. Although this school is dissolved after Parto beats a drunken Japanese soldier for attempting to assault his sister, the three remain fiercely dedicated to fighting for independence, and they join the Pembela Tanah Air (PETA) after it is established; Shimazaki holds a leadership role.

After Japan's defeat in the Pacific and subsequent surrender, Shimazaki is conflicted in his loyalties, wondering if he should go back to Japan, or stay in the newly proclaimed Republic of Indonesia and fight to defend its sovereignty. At first, he does not abandon his duties to Japan, and refuses to give PETA weapons to the Indonesian guerillas, said weapons having been earmarked for surrender to the Allies. Armed only with bambu runcing (sharpened bamboo spears), these guerillas are easily killed by the returning Dutch forces and their allies. Finally, a group of former PETA soldiers – led by Nurhadi, Parto and Asep – go to the Japanese headquarters to force Shimizaki to give them the weapons. After a lengthy stand-off, he agrees to surrender the weapons and to accompany the guerrillas in fighting, saying goodbye to his friend Lieutenant Miyata (Naoki Hosaka).

Shimazaki is captured by Dutch forces, but saved by his fellow guerillas; many die in the effort, including Parto. In reciprocation, the Dutch capture Miyata, accuse him masterminding Shimazaki's escape, and execute him. Learning of this, Shimazaki hardens his resolve to fight for Indonesian independence. After marrying a Javanese nurse, Aryati, Shimazaki goes with several other Japanese soldiers to retake the republican capital at Yogyakarta, which had been occupied during Operation Crow.

The troops, under the leadership of Shimazaki and Nurhadi, face off against better-equipped pro-Dutch troops. Shimazaki's fellow Japanese soldiers are killed during the battle, as are many Indonesian guerrillas, but the battle invigorates the nationalistic spirit of the fighters. When Shimazaki and Nurhadi return to camp, they discuss the meaning of freedom. Later, as Shimazaki goes through the tags of the fallen and mourns their loss, he is killed by a sniper. After killing the sniper, Nurhadi, Aryati, and the guerrillas bury Shimazaki while singing the Indonesian national anthem, "Indonesia Raya".

Decades later, at Kalibata Heroes' Cemetery in Jakarta, Miyata's daughter Fumiko lays flowers on the graves of Miyata and Shimazaki. She is accompanied by Aryati (Mila Karmila) and Nurhadi (Eman Sulaeman), and has accepted the sacrifice of her father and his comrades, remarking that they had become "stars for freedom".

== Production ==
The title Merdeka 17805 is composed of the Indonesian word merdeka, which means "independence" or "freedom", and the date 17805 – 17 August 2605, the date of the Proclamation of Indonesian Independence according to the Japanese kōki (皇紀) calendar. According to promotional material for the film, that this dating convention was used on the proclamation of Indonesian Independence is evidence that the proclamators, Sukarno and Mohammad Hatta, felt gratitude towards the Japanese. The material further states that Japan's role in Indonesian independence continues to be remembered. Production material further notes that approximately 2,000 Japanese soldiers remained the Indonesian archipelago to help the country fight for its independence. Similar themes had been dealt with in the 1995 video Dokuritsu Ajia no Hikari (The Light of Independent Asia), completed by the National Committee for the Fiftieth Anniversary of the End of the War.

Merdeka 17805 was directed by Fuji Yukio. Advisors to the film included former Minister of Justice Yukio Hayashida and Professor Takao Fusayama of the Tokyo Medical and Dental University, the latter of whom had military experience in Sumatra during the occupation.

This Japanese-Indonesia co-production was produced by Hiroaki Fujii, Satoshi Fukushima, Subajio, and Santono, with editing completed by Akimasa Kawashima. Cinematography was handled by Kenji Takama and music was provided by Ryoichi Kuniyoshi. Merdeka 17805 starred Jundai Yamada, Lola Amaria, Naoki Hosaka, Muhammad Iqbal, Aulia Achsan, Fajar Umbara, and Koji Tsukamoto. This 122-minute film contains Japanese- and Indonesian-language dialog.

Shooting for Merdeka 17805 was completed mostly in Indonesia, over an extended period of time. The film's music, Goto Ken'ichi opines, was "subtle and moving", and together with the film's "powerful visual images" creates a form of propaganda. He suggests that Merdeka 17805 was intended to restore Japanese pride by depicting the country's role in Indonesia's – and, by association, South East Asia's – independence from Western rule. Jonathan Crow of AllMovie echoed the sentiment, describing Merdeka 17805 as a "two-fisted, hinomaru-waving, blood-and-guts ode to the soldiers who died for the glory of the emperor and for Dai Nippon".

== Release and reception ==
Merdeka 17805 was released on 12 May 2001 in Japan and distributed by Toho. It was financially successful in Japan.

Some Indonesians took issue with depictions of an old woman kissing Shimazaki's feet (a scene that Indonesian ambassador to Japan at the time, Soemadi Brotodiningrat, requested to be cut from the film), as well as scenes in which Indonesian trainees were slapped across the face by Japanese trainers. An article in Tempo argued that the film overplayed the Japanese role in Indonesia's national revolution. Goto writes that, lacking proper background knowledge of the Japanese occupation, audiences were likely to "carry away an unduly favorable impression of Japan's contribution to Indonesian independence". The film was also considered "pro-war" and "highly selective" in its approach of historical facts.

A Special Edition DVD version of the film was released by Happinet Pictures on 25 January 2002.

== Works cited ==
- Cinema Topics staff. ムルデカ17805 [Merdeka 17805]. Cinema Topics Online (in Japanese).
- ムルデカ ＭＥＲＤＥＫＡ １７８０５ [Merdeka 17805]. Kinema Junpo (in Japanese). Archived from the original on 24 May 2013.
- Crow, Johnathan. "Merdeka". AllMovie. Rovie. Archived from the original on 17 June 2022.
- Goto, Ken'ichi (2003). Tensions of Empire: Japan and Southeast Asia in the Colonial and Postcolonial World. Athens, Ohio: Ohio University Press. ISBN 978-0-89680-231-5.
- Goto, Ken'ichi (2007). "Multilayered Postcolonial Historical Space: Indonesia, the Netherlands, Japan and East Timor". In Kazuko Mōri; Ken'ichirō Hirano (eds.). A New East Asia: Toward a Regional Community. Singapore: NUS Press. pp. 20–43. ISBN 978-9971-69-388-6.
- "Through Japanese Eyes: World War II in Japanese Cinema". United States Naval Institute. 14 April 2014. Archived from the original on 17 May 2014.
