= Masako Miura =

Japanese voice actress (born 1959)

- 三浦 雅子
- Born: Masako Tamura (田村 雅子); November 29, 1959 (age 66); Usuki, Ōita, Japan
- Occupations: Voice actress; narrator
- Years active: 1981–present
- Agent: Arts Vision
- Website: Official profile

Masako Tamura (田村 雅子, Tamura Masako; born November 29, 1959 in Ōita Prefecture, Japan), known professionally as Masako Miura (三浦 雅子, Miura Masako), is a Japanese voice actress employed by the talent management firm Arts Vision.

== Personal life ==
Her personal hobbies include playing the piano, making confectionery, and gardening.

== Filmography ==
=== Television animation ===
List of voice performances in television animation
Year	Title	Role	Notes	Source
1981	Yattodetaman	Koyomi Himekuri		
1982	Roly-Poly Pollon: The Story of a Bratty Goddess	Pollon	Lead role	
1982	Manga Mito Kōmon	Onatsu		
1983	Perman	Michiko Sawada, Boy, Cat, Child, Dog B, Girl, Housewife, Infant, Mother, Mr. Yagi, Newlyweds, Pitcher, Puppy, Run Run, Sandy, Second, Sharp Child, Student D, Sweet Potato, Woman, Woman B, Yoshiyuki		
1983	The Kabocha Wine	Chiho		
1983	Galactic Whirlwind Sasuraiger	Susie Chō		
1983	Psycho Armor Govarian	Achika Risa, Puke		
1983	Aishite Knight	Kaoru		
1984	Little Memole	Cynthia		
1984	Fushigi na Koala Blinky	Printy		
1984	Tongari Bōshi no Memole	Cynthia		
1985	Shōwa Ahō Zōshi Akanuke Ichiban!	Rel Borgen		
1986	Mock & Sweet	Sweet/Hanamogu	Lead role	
1987	Saint Seiya	Helen	Eps 54-55	
1988	City Hunter 2	Naomi Okabe		
1989	Esper Mami	Saori Fujino		
1990	RPG Densetsu Hepoi	Popoko		
1991	Yawara!	Kaori Yamada		
1991	High School Mystery: Gakuen Nanafushigi	Emi Ishida		
1991	Goldfish Warning!	Tamiko Umino		
1992	Super Bikkuriman	Mānya		
1992	Let's Go! Anpanman	Queen of Cardland, Bananaman (A)	First voice of Queen of Cardland, Second voice of Bananaman (A)	
1992	Jeanie with the Light Brown Hair	Cathy		
1995	Chibi Maruko-chan	Yumiko, Kazuko Sasayama, Toshiko Tsuchihashi, Girl	First voice of Toshio Tsuchihashi	
1996	Crayon Shin-chan	Yumi Kusaka		
1998	Yoshimoto Muchikko Monogatari	Namekuji Tamayo		
2004	Atashin'chi	Cousin A		
2025	The Style of Hiroshi Nohara's Lunch	Yumi Kusaka	Eps 1, 10-12	

=== Theatrical animation ===
List of voice performances in theatrical animation
Year	Title	Role	Notes	Source
1983	Perman: Birdman Has Arrived!!	Michiko Sawada		
1991	Kero Kero Keroppi's Three Musketeers	Keroleen	Main role	
2003	Pa-Pa-Pa the Movie: Perman	Michiko		
2014	Crayon Shin-chan: Serious Battle! Robot Dad Strikes Back	Yumi Kusaka		

=== Original video animation (OVA) ===
List of voice performances in original video animation
Year	Title	Role	Notes	Source
1990–1994	Kero Kero Keroppi	Keroleen		
