= Mock & Sweet =

Japanese anime television series

ドリモグだァ!!
- Anime television series
- Directed by: Hiroshi Kuzuoka
- Produced by: Toru Horikoshi, Kiyomichi Suzuki
- Written by: Yasunori Kawauchi, Seiji Matsuoka, Koichi Mizude, Kyôka Kuni, Kôhan Kawauchi, Takashi Yamada, Hiroshi Fukami, Miho Maruo
- Music by: Goro Nogi
- Studio: Japcon Mart
- Original network: NTV
- Original run: October 10, 1986 – October 4, 1987
- Episodes: 49

Mock & Sweet (ドリモグだァ!!, Dorimogudaa!!) is a Japanese anime series. Mock and his sister, Sweet, are curious about the fuss on the earth and eventually decide to come out of the ground. They save the poor, the innocent and the brave whenever and wherever these people need help. Mock and Sweet get rid of tyrants, evil kings and notorious emperors, with smart and funny tricks a la Mole! The story background follows major historic events, with the subject matter frequently including dark topics.

The series aired in Brazil on TV Globo's network in the late 80s during Xou da Xuxa. In Japan, the series was broadcast on most of the NNN-NNS affiliates on a Wednesday 7pm slot.

== Cast ==
- Mock/Dorimogu - Toshiko Fujita
- Sweet/Hanamogu - Masako Miura
- Ronald - Kenyu Horiuchi
- Carl - Junpei Takiguchi
- Narration Takuro Kitagawa
