= Edo o Kiru =

Japanese television series

Edo o Kiru (江戸を斬る) or Slashing Edo was a popular jidaigeki on Japan's Tokyo Broadcasting System. During the decades from its 1973 premiere until 1994, finale, 214 episodes aired. It lasted through eight series, with several casts and settings. It ran on Monday evenings in the 8:00–8:54 prime time slot, sponsored by National, and remains popular in reruns.

The first series featured popular actor Muga Takewaki, a co-star in the network's program Ōoka Echizen, which alternated with Edo o Kiru in the same time slot. He played Hoshina Masayuki, half-brother of shōgun Tokugawa Iemitsu, masquerading as Azusa Ukon in a good-over-evil drama set in Edo. Also on the cast was Matsuzaka Keiko, who continued in the next several versions of the show.

Versions two through six starred the popular actor/singer Saigō Teruhiko in the role of Tōyama Kagemoto, or Tōyama no Kin-san, a samurai who lived among the commoners, to the point of having a huge sakura tattoo drawn on his shoulder, but later became chief administrator of Edo. In this version of the Kin-san story (which has been the subject of several other series), Kinshiro lived in the house of the woman who had been his nursemaid (played by Masumi Harukawa, later O-Sai of Abarenbō Shōgun), the proprietor of a fish-dealer. O-Yuki (Keiko Matsuzaka), pretending to be her daughter, is actually a daughter of Tokugawa Nariaki, daimyō of the Mito domain, and eventually marries Kin-san. Wearing a purple cloth over her head and face, and wielding a sword in the Yagyū Shinkage-ryū manner, she works outside the law to bring justice to the wicked. At her right hand is an employee at the shop, Jirokichi (kabuki actor Matsuyama Eitarō, 1942–1991). The former Robin Hood-style thief Nezumi Kozō, he became an undercover agent for the Kin-san/O-Yuki team. Morishige Hisaya (b. 1913) played Nariaki in special guest appearances.

Actress Judy Ongg assumed a supporting role as the female constable O-kyō in the fourth series.

A major cast change brought veteran jidaigeki actor Kōtarō Satomi to the lead role, again as Kin-san, for the seventh and eighth series.
