= Manga Mito Kōmon =

Japanese anime television series

まんが水戸黄門
- Anime television series
- Directed by: Kazuyuki Okasako
- Music by: Kentarō Haneda
- Studio: Knack Productions
- Original network: TV Tokyo
- Original run: 3 September 1981 – 15 July 1982
- Episodes: 46

Manga Mito Kōmon (まんが水戸黄門) is a Japanese shōnen anime television series consisting of 46 episodes directed by Kazuyuki Okasako. Loosely based on real life events of Tokugawa Mitsukuni, it is considered as a sort of remake of the successful jidaigeki drama Mito Kōmon filled with more fantastic elements.

== Plot ==
The shōgun Mito Mitsukuni crosses Japan in disguise, accompanied by two bodyguards, the master swordsman Suke (Sasashi Sukesumaburo) and the strongman Kaku-san (Atsumi Kakunoshin), the grandson Sutemaru, the dog Dombee and, in part of the series, by a girl named Yuki.

Each episode follows a basic plot: the group arrives in a village, with the shōgun hiding his identity. While they are resting they happen to witness some mysteries and some wrongdoings done by local personalities, prompting the group to investigate.

In the end of every episode Suke and Kaku confront the main evildoer and, after a brawl in which Suke and Kaku show their physical prowess besting the minions of the main perpetrator with their abilities (Suke valiantly fighting with his katana, Kaku showing off "the strength of 100 men" to overcome his enemies), Suke shows the inrō that reveals Mitsukuni identity, ordering the villains to surrender and accept Mitsukuni's judgment, who then explains the mystery as an act of deliberate evil, punishes the wrongdoers and encourages the good people to go on with their lives.

== Cast ==
- Hirotaka Suzuoki as Sasaki Sukesumaburo (Suke-san)
- Masaru Ikeda as Atsumi Kakunoshin (Kaku-San)
- Toshiya Sugita as Mito Kōmon (Tokugawa Mitsukuni)
- Kazue Ikura as Okoto
- Masako Miura as Onatsu
- Naoki Tatsuta as Donbee
- Yōko Matsuoka as Sutemaru
