= Tōyama no Kin-san =

Fictional samurai based on Tōyama Kagemoto

Tōyama no Kin-san (遠山の金さん) is a popular character based on the historical Tōyama Kagemoto, a samurai and official of the Tokugawa shogunate during the Edo period of Japanese history. In kabuki and kōdan, he was celebrated under his childhood name, Kinshirō, shortened to Kin-san. He was said to have left home as a young man, and lived among the commoners, even having a tattoo of flowering sakura trees on his shoulder. This story developed into a legend of helping the common people.

The novelist Tatsurō Jinde (陣出達郎) wrote a series of books about Kin-san. Noted actor Chiezō Kataoka starred in a series of eighteen Toei jidaigeki films about him. Several Japanese television networks have aired series based on the character. These variously portrayed him pretending to be a petty hood or a yojinbō while solving crimes as the chief of police.

People famous for having portrayed Kin-san on television include kabuki stars Nakamura Umenosuke IV and Ichikawa Danshirō, singers Yukio Hashi and Teruhiko Saigō, and actors Ryōtarō Sugi, Hideki Takahashi, Hiroki Matsukata, and Kōtarō Satomi. Saigō and Satomi portrayed Kin-san in the series Edo o Kiru.

== Film versions ==
Eighteen films from Toei starred Chiezō Kataoka:

- The Tattooed Magistrate: Cherry Blossoms Dance Volume (いれずみ判官 桜花乱舞の巻) (1950)
- The Tattooed Magistrate: Fallen Flowers Showdown Volume (いれずみ判官 落花対決の巻) (1950)
- The Official and the Princess of Thieves (女賊と判官) (1951)
- The Well-known Magistrate (お馴染み判官 あばれ神輿) (1951)
- The Jumping Magistrate (飛びっちょ判官) (1952)
- The Bloody Cherry Blossom Magistrate (血ざくら判官) (1954)
- A Gang of Five (勢ぞろい喧嘩若衆) (1955)
- The Fighting Magistrate (喧嘩奉行) (1955)
- The Roar of The Lion (荒獅子判官) (1955)
- Short Sword Magistrate (長脇差奉行) (1956)
- Pirates Magistrate (海賊奉行) (1957)
- Falcon Magistrate (はやぶさ奉行) (1957)
- Fireball Magistrate (火の玉奉行) (1958)
- Whirlwind Magistrate (たつまき奉行) (1959)
- The Edo Official and the Apprentice (江戸っ子判官とふり袖小僧) (1959)
- The Official with a Tattoo (御存じいれずみ判官) (1960)
- The Magistrate of Chess (さいころ奉行) (1961)
- Sakura Official (さくら判官) (1962)

== Television series ==
- Tōyama no Kin-san Torimonochō starring Shunji Natsume on Fuji Television
- Tōyama no Kin-san starring Ebizō Ichikawa on Nippon Television
- Tōyama no Kin-san Torimonochō starring Nakamura Umenosuke IV on TV Asahi (NET)
- Gozonji Tōyama no Kin-san starring Ichikawa Danshirō on TV Asahi (NET)
- Gozonji Kin-san no Torimonochō starring Yukio Hashi on TV Asahi (NET)
- Tōyama no Kin-san on NET, renamed TV Asahi
  - starring Ryōtarō Sugi from 1975 to 1979 (Sugi also sang the theme song)
  - starring Hideki Takahashi from 1982 to 1986
- Meibugyō Tōyama no Kin-san starring Hiroki Matsukata on TV Asahi
  - Cast included (at various times) Ryōko Sakaguchi, Kimiko Ikegami, Keiko Saitō, Casey Takamine, Tetsuo Ishidate, Kazuo Nakamura, Gō Wakabayashi
- Edo o Kiru starring Teruhiko Saigō and later Kotarō Satomi on TBS, 1975 to 1994
- Tōyama no Kin-san on TV Asahi starring Ken Matsudaira, beginning in January, 2007
- Oh Edo Rocket (anime) featured Toyama as a continuing minor character
