= Miss Machiko =

Japanese media franchise

- Miss Machiko manga volume 1 cover

まいっちんぐマチコ先生 (Maicching Machiko Sensei)
- Genre: Comedy
- Manga
- Written by: Takeshi Ebihara
- Published by: Gakken
- Magazine: Shōnen Challenge
- Original run: May 1980 – February 1982
- Volumes: 8
- Anime television series
- Directed by: Masami Anno
- Produced by: Hyota Ezu (TV Tokyo); Matsue Jinbo (Gakken); Nobuyuki Morishima (Gakken)
- Written by: Shigemitsu Taguchi
- Music by: Hiroki Inui
- Studio: Studio Pierrot
- Licensed by: NA: Discotek Media
- Original network: TV Tokyo
- Original run: October 8, 1981 – October 6, 1983
- Episodes: 95
- Live-action film

Jisshaban: Maicching Machiko-sensei
- Directed by: Minoru Kawasaki
- Written by: Yuho Moritomo; Minoru Kawasaki
- Studio: Total Media Corporation
- Released: March 2003
- Runtime: 75 minutes
- Live-action film

Maicching Machiko-sensei: Let's! Rinkai Gakkō
- Directed by: Minoru Kawasaki
- Written by: Yuho Moritomo; Minoru Kawasaki
- Studio: Total Media Corporation
- Released: September 2003
- Runtime: 70 minutes
- Live-action film

Maicching Machiko-sensei the Movie: Oh! Cosplay Dai Sakusen
- Directed by: Minoru Kawasaki
- Written by: Masakazu Migita; Minoru Kawasaki
- Studio: Total Media Corporation
- Released: October 2004
- Runtime: 70 minutes
- Live-action film

Maicching Machiko! Begins
- Directed by: Kosuke Suzuki
- Written by: Shoichiro Masumoto
- Studio: King Records
- Released: September 2005
- Runtime: 80 minutes
- Live-action film

Maicching Machiko-sensei: Toudai o Juken Dai Sakusen!!
- Directed by: Minoru Kawasaki
- Written by: Shiori Adachi; Minoru Kawasaki
- Studio: Total Media Corporation
- Released: February 22, 2006
- Runtime: 70 minutes
- Live-action film

Maicching Machiko-sensei: Go! Go!!! Katei Hōmon! !
- Directed by: Tenkaku Naniwa
- Written by: Takeshi Ebihara
- Studio: Total Media Corporation
- Released: May 2007
- Runtime: 70 minutes
- Live-action film

Maicching Machiko-sensei: Viva! Momoka-chan!
- Directed by: Tenkaku Naniwa
- Written by: Hirotake Kumamoto
- Studio: Total Media Corporation
- Released: August 2008
- Runtime: 76 minutes
- Live-action film

Maicching Machiko-sensei: Muteki no Oppai banchō Tai Man Shōbu de, Maitchingu
- Directed by: Chū Ueda
- Written by: Takeshi Ebihara; Kenji Ichigatsu
- Studio: Total Media Corporation
- Released: September 4, 2009
- Runtime: 77 minutes
- Live-action film

Maicching Machiko-sensei: Kimodameshi de Maicching
- Directed by: Sosuke Higashimura
- Studio: Zen Pictures
- Released: December 13, 2013
- Runtime: 72 minutes
- Live-action film

Hatsukoi Sukecchi: Maicching Machiko-sensei
- Directed by: Tomoyuki Kamimura
- Produced by: Ayako Fujiwara
- Written by: Shibuji Nagisawa
- Music by: Yoichi Hotta
- Released: September 4, 2018
- Runtime: 70 minutes

Miss Machiko, also known as Maicching Machiko-sensei (まいっちんぐマチコ先生, Maitchingu Machiko-sensei; lit. 'The Shame of Miss Machiko') is a manga series written by Takeshi Ebihara. It was serialized in Japan in Shōnen Challenge from May 1980 through February 1982. The individual chapters were collected and published in eight tankōbon volumes by Gakken.

The series was adapted into a 95 episode anime series by Studio Pierrot that aired in Japan on TV Tokyo from October 8, 1981, to October 6, 1983. It was also adapted into four live-action OVAs, and two full-length live-action films. The anime was licensed for online streaming by Discotek Media in 2016, which would later turn to full rights in 2020.

== Plot ==
The series revolves around Miss Machiko Mai, a new middle school teacher who wears a revealing bubblegum skirt, and regularly finding herself in accidental sexual situations. Machiko is very popular with her students, especially the teenage boys, who take delight in lifting up her skirts and devising traps to catch her in various stages of undress. Rather than get angry, Machiko responds by laughing it off and uttering her trademark phrase, "Maicchingu!" (meaning "How embarrassing"). Mai is generally a very kind and patient woman who cares about her students and does her best to help them with their problems.

== Characters ==
Mai Machiko

She is one of the main character of the series. She is a glamorous young teacher, who is a new homeroom teacher at Arama Academy. She is very kind-hearted and always helpful to her students, among whom she is very popular. The boys take delight in lifting up her skirts and devising traps to catch her in various stages of undress. She has been described as having 'the perfect proportions'. Machiko understands that the boys only play pranks on her because they like her, and laughs them off by saying "Maicchingu!" (meaning "How embarrassing".)

In the series, her skirt is often lifted up by the boys so they can see her underwear, and also take delight in peeking while she is bathing. There are many scenes in which her clothes are shown torn up, where her breasts and butt are clearly visible. In the show, her bras, panties, breasts, and butt are shown.

Kenta

Kenta is also one of the protagonists, usually the main one to lift up the skirts of Machiko and the other girls of the school. He is not very good at studying, but is good in sports like skateboarding and frisbee. He is one of the most popular and mischievous students at the school. He is described as 'a pervert', who takes delight in flipping the skirts of all the girls around the school and touching their breasts, much to the annoyance of his girl classmates.

Kame

Kame is the best friend of Kenta, who usually accompanies Kenta in his pranks. He is usually a shy and calm personality, but can get a little out-of-control sometimes. He is usually shown as various swirling glasses.

Kinzo

Kinzo is also one of the best friends of Kenta. He has a fat body and appears as part of the trio of Kenta, Kame, and himself. He likes wrestling and would like to become a pro wrestler some day.

Hiroshi

A boy with glasses who's very intelligent at school.

Shizuo

A large boy who's good at cooking.

== Media ==
=== Manga ===
The manga was created by Takeshi Ebihara, and consists of 8 volumes that were published between 1980 and 1985 in Japan, and serialized in the Gakken magazine Shōnen Challenge. As with the anime television series, the manga series was known for its overt sexual humor. The individual chapters were collected and published in eight tankōbon volumes by Gakken.

=== Anime ===
Studio Pierrot, with assistance from Studio Gallop, adapted the manga into an anime television series which premiered in Japan on TV Tokyo on October 8, 1981, where it ran for 95 episodes until its conclusion on October 6, 1983. The episodes were written by Shiori Adachi and directed by the manga's author, Ebihara. Rihoko Yoshida provided the voice of Miss Machiko.

==== Cast ====
- Machiko Mai: Rihoko Yoshida
- Kenta Ikegami: Masako Nozawa
- Tamao Kameyama: Noriko Tsukase
- Kinzo Yuki: Naoki Tatsuta
- Kunio Yamagata: Shigeru Chiba
- Principal Kokedaruma: Hiroshi Ohtake
- Vice-principal: Yoneko Matsukane
- Mr. Fukuoka, Mr. Kagoshima: Kaneto Shiozawa

Mr. Fukuoka flew to another country in episode 52; another character, Mr. Kagoshima, was introduced in episode 56.

- Mr. Aomori: Mahito Tsujimura
- Madoka: Kumiko Takizawa
- Tenko: Sanae Takagi
- Hiromi: Shinobu Adachi, Chihoko Shigeta
- Maruko: Mie Suzuki
- Hiroshi: Tomiko Suzuki
- Machiko's Uncle: Masaru Ikeda → Yasuo Muramatsu
- Machiko's Aunt: Miyoko Aso

=== Live-action ===
Total Media Corporation adapted the series into seven full-length live-action films and King Records also produced a film version of the series. In the first two films, both released in 2003, Machiko is played by Kaori Nakata, and in the third, released in 2004, she is played by Haruka Nanami. These three films are directed by Minoru Kawasaki. The film released by King Records and the fourth in total, Maicching Machiko! Begins (まいっちんぐ! マチコ ビギンズ, Maicching Machiko! Biginzu), was released in September 2005, with Sayaka Isoyama playing the titular character and Kosuke Suzuki as the director. The fifth full-length film, Maicching Machiko-sensei: Toudai o Juken Dai Sakusen!! (まいっちんぐマチコ先生 東大お受験大作戦!!), was released theatrically in Japan on February 22, 2006. In this film, directed by Minoru Kawasaki, Hanako Nanjo plays Machiko. Yuuri Morishita stars in the sixth film as well as the seventh one, and both are directed by Tenkaku Naniwa. In 2009, a ninth film was released; this time with Hitomi Aizawa playing Machiko and Chū Ueda directing it.

== Reception ==
The anime series placed in #97 on "Celebrity List" of TV Asahi's survey of Japan's 100 favorite animated television series.
