= Ryōtarō Sugi =

Japanese singer and actor (born 1944)

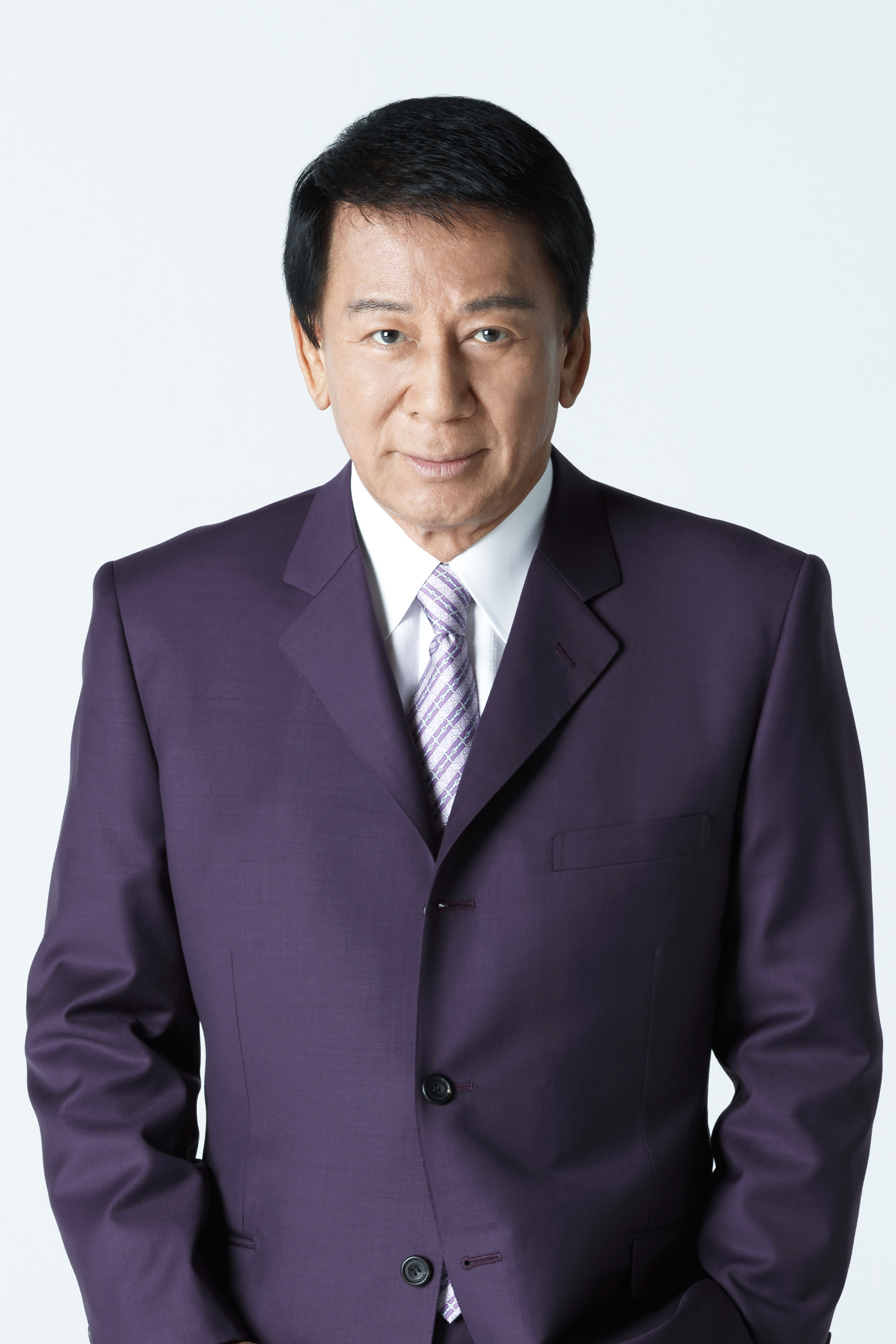
- Ryōtarō Sugi
- Born: August 14, 1944 (age 81); Kobe, Japan
- Occupations: Actor, singer
- Years active: 1965–present
- Spouse: Natsuko Godai (m. 1999)
- Children: Jundai Yamada
- Website: https://r-sugi.jp/

Ryōtarō Sugi (杉良太郎, Sugi Ryōtarō; real name 山田勝啓 Katsuhiro Yamada) (born 14 August 1944, Kobe) is a Japanese singer and actor. He is the father of actor Jundai Yamada.

He appeared in Sukima Kaze, which sold over a million copies. His acting credits include 18 films. On television, he specialized in jidaigeki roles, appearing as the first Suke-san in Mito Kōmon (seasons 1 and 2); his son Jundai Yamada played Kaku-san in the same show (seasons 29 to 31). He played the lead character in Ōedo Sōsamō, appearing from 1970-74. In the 1971–72 season he portrayed Isshin Tasuke in a series of the same name, and from 1975 to 1977 he played Tōyama no Kin-san; his Sukima Kaze was the theme song. With former Miss Universe contestant Hisako Manda he starred in Kenka-ya Ukon (1992–94).

== Filmography ==
=== Film ===
- Tokyo Drifter 2: The Sea is Bright Red as the Color of Love (1966)
- Man Who Causes a Storm (1966)
- A Colt Is My Passport (1967)
- Shinran: The Purpose of Life (2025) – old Shinran (voice)

=== Television ===
- Moeyo Ken (1966) – Okita Sōji
- Mito Kōmon (1969) – Sukesan
- Ten to Chi to (1969) – Oda Nobunaga
- Ōedo Sōsamō (1970–74) – Jūmonji Koyata
- Kunitori Monogatari (1973) – Azai Nagamasa
- Takeda Shingen (1988) – Hōjō Ujiyasu
- Tokugawa Yoshinobu (1998) – Ii Naosuke

== Honours ==
- Medal with Green ribbon (2008)
- Medal with Purple Ribbon (2009)
- Person of Cultural Merit (2016)
