= Jundai Yamada =

Japanese actor

- 山田 純大
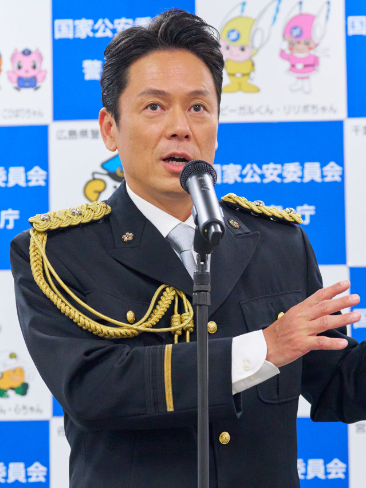
- Born: Sumihiro Yamada; 14 February 1973 (age 53); Tokyo, Japan
- Occupation: Actor
- Years active: 1997–present
- Agent: Horipro Booking Agency
- Television: Mito Kōmon; Kanta desu'!
- Height: 180 cm (5 ft 11 in)
- Spouse: Kei Takyo (m. 2016)
- Father: Ryōtarō Sugi
- Relatives: Takao Yamada (distant relative)
- Website: Official profile

Jundai Yamada (山田 純大, Yamada Jundai; born 14 February 1973, in Tokyo) is a Japanese actor. His real name is Sumihiro Yamada (山田 純大, Yamada Sumihiro). He is represented with Horipro Booking Agency. His father is actor and singer Ryōtarō Sugi.

He graduated from Seijo Gakuen Primary School. After graduating from junior high and high school in Hawaii, he also graduated from Pepperdine University Department of Asian Studies and Department of International Relations. His notable works include Roosevelt Game.

== Biography ==
Transferred from the University of Hawaii, he graduated from Department of Pepperdine University International Relations, in the United States and in 1997, he went on to play as Junnosuke Mochizuki on the NHK Asadora Aguri to debut his acting career. After that, he is active in films, television dramas and stage, including the popular Tokyo Broadcasting System drama Mito Kōmon (as Atsumi Kakunoshin) and the film Merdeka 17805 (in which he starred).

In 2013, he wrote a book about Setsuzo Kotsuji, who helped the Jewish refugees arriving at Vladivostok at the Trans-Siberian Railway under the persecution of Nazi Germany and travelled to the country of desire, Inochi no Visa o Tsunaida Otoko — Setsuzo Kotsuji to Yudaya Nanmin (A Man who Connected the Visa of Life — Setsuzo Kotsuji and the Jewish Refugees) and debuted as a non-fiction writer.

In his private life, he and former Mito Kōmon actress Kei Takyo married in the spring of 2016, in which they had been dating in 2001. Their first child was a girl born on 19 December 2016.

== Filmography ==
=== Film ===
Year	Title	Role	Notes	Ref.
1997	Cute	Ichinose		
2001	Merdeka 17805	Captain Shimazaki	Lead role	
2024	Samurai Detective Onihei: Blood for Blood	Yūsuke Sakai		
2025	Saving Shuli-San			

=== TV dramas ===
Run	Title	Role	Network	Notes	Ref.
1997	Aguri	Junnosuke Yoshiyuki	NHK	Asadora	
2001–03	Mito Kōmon	Atsumi Kakunoshin	TBS		
2013	Hanzawa Naoki	Keijiro Fukuyama	TBS	Episode 2	
2022	Invisible	Joji Kamioka	TBS	Episode 7	

== Bibliography ==
Year	Title	Publisher	Code
2013	Inochi no Visa o Tsunaida Otoko — Setsuzo Kotsuji to Yudaya Nanmin	NHK	ISBN 978-4140815991
