= The Chaos of the Ghost Cat of Arima =

The Chaos of the Ghost Cat of Arima is a Japanese play from the Edo period. It is a fable about a monstrous cat in a noble court who protects and ultimately avenges a young maid who had been kind to it.

The title of the play was originally prefaced with ‘Arimatsuzome Sumō Yukata' 有松染相撲浴衣 (ありまつぞめすもうゆかた), Arimatsu Dyed Sūmo Yukata. Arimatsu tie-dyed yukata are popular with Japanese Sumō wrestlers. The title of the play suggests that it was used to advertise this fact. Another explanation is that the play had originally been sponsored by the tie-dyeing industry of Arimatsu. The play is set in Kurume Domain in Kyūshu's Chikugo Province (now Fukuoka Prefecture).

== Story ==
The eighth Lord of the 21 mangoku (1) Kurume Domain is Matsudaira Dewa no Kami. His daughter, Princess Chiyo, lives in a mansion in an 18 mangoku neighbourhood in the Unshō District of Matsue. Sekiya, one of the ladies in waiting at the Lord's Palace, has a maid called Otaki who is a niece of Takao Jūzaemon. It is hoped by Otaki's family that she will be able to find a dependable husband to marry.

It is the private quarters of the Matsudaira's Palace where a banquet is taking place. A dog runs in chasing a kitten. The kitten tries to hide behind the Lord. As the frenzied dog tries to reach the kitten it snaps at the Lord. Sekiya, who is nearby, picks up an iron ladle from a chōzubachi wash basin and strikes the dog on the forehead, killing it. The dog's corpse is quickly taken away. Sekiya is told by the Matsudaira that he is impressed with her speed and agility and that he would like to reward her with a gift of some sort, something that she desires perhaps. He thanks her for her compassion towards the kitten which, its life having been saved runs away. He is attracted to her cleverness, selflessness and the tender compassion which she showed to the kitten that she saved. He lavishes affection on her and shows appreciation towards her maid Otaki.

The other ladies in waiting at the Palace and other members of the Kurume Clan burn with jealousy and bully Otaki. She is particularly badly bullied by the most senior lady in waiting Iwanami. As the bullying becomes more severe Otaki turns to her mother for support. Rumours abound that Otaki is disillusioned about finding a husband and that as a result of the bullying she has set off for Edo. It is also rumoured that as a kind and gentle-hearted person she is feeling like committing suicide to end the pain and anguish she is suffering. Otaki has in fact found new employment as a samurai's maid called Onaka.

When her master mysteriously dies she is furious and pursues the senior lady-in-waiting, Iwanami. Otaki is determined to murder Iwanami and attacks her. However, Iwanami is an expert with the naginata halberd and in the twinkling of an eye she kills Otaki, the would-be avenger.

After Otaki is killed, a monster called Asuka appears and launches an attack on Iwanami, seizes her by the throat, tears out her windpipe and eats her. The monster is, in fact, the cat that Otaki had helped and shown affection to. Because she had slain Otaki the cat had violently killed Iwanami. Inside the Arima Clan's Edo style house there is uproar and all the people who had caused trouble are systematically slain. At Otaki's parents house there is 30 ryo which Otaki had left there along with another 50 ryo in a small box. In total 80 ryo which she had secretly entrusted for safekeeping to her brother Yokichi, the birth son of their mother. Blocking out the death of his sister and unable to mourn Yokichi leaves and at the Palace gates accidentally drops the money but picks it up and puts it in his breast pocket. Narusawa Osuke, an ashigaru foot soldier sees this, and follows Yokichi towards Edo. On the way, he tricks Yokichi and kills him betraying Yokichi's mother and takes the 80 ryo and puts it in his neck wallet. Narusawa's comrade suspects him and is murdered and the crime is concealed.

The monster cat that Otaki had loved appears again, attacks Narusawa and tries to retrieve the neck wallet which he has put in his breast pocket. The first attack fails and the cat dashes around running amok. It attacks Narusawa again and tears out his throat, kills and eats him. Then it climbs the fire observation tower where it kills and eats two more people. A blood rage sets in and it begins to wreak revenge on the Arima Clan. There is complete chaos as the people of the Arima Clan are killed by the cat.

Matsudaira is out in his beloved garden with Yamamura Tenzen when a strange animal appears. Yamamura Tenzen, without telegraphing his actions, strikes at the beast with his sword several times.

Later the cat, intent on avenging Otaki, hurls itself at Matsudaira and his favourite mistress who is pregnant and kills and eats them. In the meantime, unbeknownst to Yamamura Tenzen, the cat kills and eats his ailing mother and transforms itself into her image. When he returns home his aged mother has a wound on her forehead. Yamamura Tenzen considers this very strange and he starts to notice the inappropriate behaviour of his mother and the strange way she speaks. He realizes that the mysterious magical cat that escaped from him and which he had failed to catch and kill is disguised as his mother.

At the same time, the okakae (2) retainer the riskishi Sumō wrestler Onogawa Kisaburō is at the Arima Clan house. He has been defeated by another Sumō wrestler, Raiden Tameemon. The defeated Onogawa is due to meet Raiden on Kudanzaka Hill so that they can settle their differences and end their grudge.

At Kudanzaka Hill they meet and just as they are both about to draw their swords and let loose a tide of blood the Kurume warrior and jujitsu master, Inukami Gunbei, who has been appointed to control the situation and arbitrate between the two wrestlers, arrives. As a result of his failure, Onogawa, who had hoped to distinguish himself, intends to request that he be dismissed by his Lord and apologises.

They all join swords with Yamamura Tenzen. Stealthily climbing the fire observation tower at the Akabane Daimyō residence they kill the monster cat and then the okakae forces return to the Arima Clan house.

== In popular culture ==
The legend of the ghost cat of Arima has inspired the following films:

- Arima no neko sodo (the cat fight of Arima), a 1916 short movie with Masahiro Makino
- Arima Neko (the Arima cat) a 1937 horror film
- Ghost-Cat of Arima Palace, a 1953 horror film

== Notes ==
1. Mangoku - Japanese measure of value by the Shōgunate during the Edo period: man 10,000 koku – barrel of rice
2. A retainer traditionally hired for one generation
