= Naoki Tatsuta =

Japanese voice actor (born 1950)

- 龍田 直樹
- Born: September 8, 1950 (age 76); Iwade Town, Naga District, Wakayama Prefecture, Japan
- Other names: Naoki Tatsuta (竜田 直樹); Naoki Katsuta (勝田 直樹); Tatchan (たっちゃん)
- Occupation: Voice actor
- Years active: 1976–present
- Agent: Aoni Production
- Spouse: Sanae Takagi
- Children: 1
- Website: Official profile

Naoki Tatsuta (龍田 直樹, Tatsuta Naoki; born September 8, 1950) is a Japanese voice actor affiliated with Aoni Production.

He is known for the roles of Buta Gorilla in Kiteretsu Daihyakka, Daima Jin in High School! Kimengumi, Oolong in Dragon Ball, Dr. Escargon in Kirby of the Stars, Ashibe's Father in Shōnen Ashibe, Capone "Gang" Bege in One Piece, and Scoop-kun in Shūkan Kodomo News.

His former stage name was Naoki Tatsuta (竜田 直樹, Tatsuta Naoki) and he is married to Japanese actress Sanae Takagi.

== Biography ==
He is a graduate of Meiji University.

He also graduated from the 25th class of the Tokyo Actor's School and the 3rd class of the Haikyō Training Institute.

After having been previously affiliated with Haikyō and Arts Vision, he is currently affiliated with Aoni Production.

=== Career ===
He used to work as a still photographer for the Otoko wa Tsurai yo film series, but admired Kiyoshi Atsumi's performance, so entered a training school in order to become an actor.

When he probed his manager saying, "I suppose I'm not cut out for visual media, am I?", they laughed and told him, "Haha, yeah, you're right!!", so he switched his career path and began his work as a voice actor.

== Personal life ==
Tatsuta's hobbies include listening to music and driving.

He was born an only child. His wife is voice actress Sanae Takagi and he has a son.

== Filmography ==
=== Television animation ===
List of voice performances in television animation
Year	Title	Role	Notes	Source
1976	Shin Don Chuck Monogatari	Additional voice	Debut anime voice role	
1979	Mobile Suit Gundam	Marker Clan, Job John		
1981	Urusei Yatsura	Satoshi / Megane	Ep. 3	
1984	Choriki Robo Galatt	Kiwi Grekovich		
1985	Doraemon	Sunetsugu Honekawa, Suneo Honekawa	Substitute voice of Suneo from November 15 to December 6, 1985	
1986	Dragon Ball	Oolong, Ko-Gamera, Boxer, Wolf, Seal Soldier		
1986	Maison Ikkoku	Kindergarten Principal		
1987	Transformers: The Headmasters	Mindwipe (Japanese: Wipe)		
1989	Dragon Ball Z	Oolong, Karin, Yamu, Bubbles, Haiya Dragon, Tsuno, Mayor		
1991	21 Emon	Gonsuke		
1993	Dragon League	Amon		
1996	Dragon Ball GT	Big Bro' Kidnapper		
1996	GeGeGe no Kitarō	Ittan Momen, Nurikabe		
1998	Cowboy Bebop	Dr. Yuuri Kellerman		
1999	Cyborg Kuro-chan	Narrator		
2001	Kirby of the Stars	Dr. Escargon		
2002	Magical☆Shopping Arcade Abenobashi	Shin Imamiya, Aban narration		
2002	Mobile Suit Gundam SEED	Lewis Halberton		
2003	Astro Boy	Robita		
2006	Gin Tama	Yagyu Binbokusai		
2007	GeGeGe no Kitarō	Konaki-Jijii, Nurikabe		
2009	Dragon Ball Kai	Oolong		
2009	Sergeant Keroro	Space Zoumushi	Ep. 263	
2011	Hunter × Hunter	Zenji		
2015	Dragon Ball Super	Oolong, Magetta, Kaiō-sama and Narrator	Indefinitely took over the latter two on September 27, 2015 while Jōji Yanami took medical leave	
2017	Kado: The Right Answer	Kazunori Osakabe	Ep. 0	
2018	GeGeGe no Kitarō	Abura-sumashi, Miminaga, Demon Buer, Oshiroibaba	Abura-sumashi in Ep. 5, Miminaga in Ep. 27, Demon Buer in Ep. 33, Oshiroibaba in Ep. 44	
2021	Heaven's Design Team	God, the Creator		
2023	Kubo Won't Let Me Be Invisible	Unsen-sensei		
2024	Pokémon Horizons	Siskel	Ep. 77	
2024	Dragon Ball Daima	Narration		
2025	Future's Folktales	Walid		

==== Unknown date ====
- Angel Heart (Hideo Mochiyama)
- Anime Sanjushi (Coby)
- Aura Battler Dunbine (Hon Wan, Numerous minor characters)
- B Biidaman Bakugaiden V (Count Dracula)
- Blue Gale Xabungle (Propopiev Sandora)
- Bomberman Jetters (Dr. Mechado)
- Chikkun Takkun (Jitabata Mechaman)
- Demashita! Powerpuff Girls Z (Poncho)
- Dragon Quest (Zanack)
- Dragon Quest: Dai no Daibōken (Zaboera)
- Duel Masters (Maruo Kakuko)
- Fearsome Biomen Umekichi
- Future GPX Cyber Formula (Edelhi Bootsvorz)
- Hajime no Ippo (Yanaoka)
- Hare Tokidoki Buta (Principal)
- High School! Kimengumi (Daima Jin)
- Kyatto Ninden Teyandee (Gennarisai)
- Kaito Joker (Dokusaburou Oniyama)
- Kimagure Orange Road (Kazuya Hatta)
- Kingyo Chūihō (Same)
- Kinnikuman: Nisei (Nakano-san, Minch)
- Kiteretsu Daihyakka (Kaoru Kumada (Buta Gorilla) (2nd appearance))
- Maho Girls PreCure! (Labut)
- Mahō no Star Magical Emi (Topo)
- Maitchingu Machiko-sensei (Kinzō Abashiri)
- Mashurambō (Kūtaru)
- Meimon! Daisan Yakyūbu (Hiroshi Takahashi)
- Metal Fighter MIKU (Kōzō Shibano)
- Mobile Fighter G Gundam (Romalio Monini)
- Mobile Suit Gundam SEED Destiny (Lewis Halberton)
- Mobile Suit Gundam ZZ (Danny, Dudemo)
- Mushrambo (Kutal)
- Nine: Final (Okabe)
- Obake no Q-tarō (Kisa)
- One Piece (Tonjit, Capone Bege, Vasco Shot)
- Pokémon (Professor Nishinomori)
- Red Baron (Isao Kumano)
- Sailor Moon Supers (Mister Magic Pierrot, Old Dentist)
- Saint Seiya (Jamian)
- Shin Hakkenden (Chūji)
- Shōnen Ashibe (Ashibe's dad)
- Sorcerer Hunters (Sukoya)
- Sue Cat (Billy)
- Susie-chan to Marvie (Professor Peabunny)
- Tanoshii Willow Town (Tad)
- Tsuribaka Nisshi (Kazuo Sasaki)
- Wowser (Wowser)
- Yu-Gi-Oh! Duel Monsters GX (Vice-Principal Napoleon)
- Zipang (Kanji Ishiwara)

=== Theatrical animation ===
List of voice performances in theatrical animation
Year	Title	Role	Notes	Source
1981	Doraemon: The Records of Nobita, Spaceblazer	Middle School Student		
1983	Nine	Sata		
1986	Highschool! Kimen-gumi	Daima Jin		
1986	Dragon Ball: Curse of the Blood Rubies	Oolong		
1987	Dragon Ball: Sleeping Princess in Devil's Castle	Oolong		
1988	My Neighbor Totoro	Catbus		
1988	Dragon Ball: Mystical Adventure	Oolong		
1988	Kimagure Orange Road: I Want to Return to That Day	Kazuya Hatta		
1990	Dragon Ball Z: The World's Strongest	Oolong		
1990	Doraemon: Nobita and the Animal Planet	Crow		
1990	Dragon Ball Z: The Tree of Might	Oolong, Haiya Dragon, Bubbles		
1991	Dragon Ball Z: Lord Slug	Oolong, Haiya Dragon, Bubbles		
1991	Dragon Ball Z: Cooler's Revenge	Oolong, Haiya Dragon		
1992	Dragon Ball Z: The Return of Cooler	Oolong		
1992	Dragon Ball Z: Super Android 13!	Oolong		
1993	Dragon Ball Z: Broly – The Legendary Super Saiyan	Oolong, Bubbles		
1993	Dragon Ball Z: Bojack Unbound	Oolong, Bujin, Bubbles		
1994	Dorami-chan: A Blue Straw Hat	Pump	Short film	
1994	Dragon Ball Z: Bio-Broly	Jaga Bada, Bubbles		
1995	Dragon Ball Z: Wrath of the Dragon	Oolong		
1996	Dragon Ball: The Path to Power	Oolong		
1996	Shin Kimagure Orange Road: Summer Beginning	Kazuya Hatta		
2001	Kinnikuman: Nisei	Kazuo Nakano		
2006	Dobutsu no Mori	Tanukichi/Tom Nook		
2007	Tamagotchi: The Movie	Mr. Turtle Dictionary		
2011	Doraemon: Nobita and the New Steel Troops ~Winged Angels~	Vice Commander		
2012	Doraemon: Nobita and the Island of Miracles ~Animal Adventure~	Gonsuke		
2013	Doraemon: Nobita's Secret Gadget Museum	Gonsuke		
2013	Dragon Ball Z: Battle of Gods	Oolong		
2015	Dragon Ball Z: Resurrection 'F'	Oolong		

=== Original video animation (OVA) ===
- Dream Hunter Rem (xxxx) (Beta)
- Future GPX Cyber Formula (xxxx) (Edelhi Bootsvorz)
- Grappler Baki (xxxx) (Mitsunari Tokugawa)
- Kimagure Orange Road (xxxx) (Kazuya Hatta)
- Luna Varga (xxxx) (Chef)
- Roger Rabbit's Car Toon Spin (xxxx) (Smart Ass)
- Space Pirate Captain Herlock: The Endless Odyssey (xxxx) (Yattran)
- Saint Seiya (xxxx) (Skelleton Marchino)
- Legend of the Galactic Heroes (1991) (Pretzer)

=== Original net animation (ONA) ===
- Pluto (2023) (Tse Tse Mar)

=== Video games ===
- Ace Combat 5 (xxxx) (Transport Pilot, Yuktobania Navy Commandant)
- Battle Fantasia (xxxx) (Donvalve Du Don)
- BS Super Mario Collection (xxxx) (Bowser)
- BS Super Mario USA Power Challenge (xxxx) (Commander, FryGuy, Clawglip)
- Corpse Seed (2007) (Sid Le Creuset)
- Dragon Ball Z: Budokai (2003) (Oolong, Karin)
- Dragon Ball Z: Budokai 3 (2005) (Oolong, Karin)
- Final Fantasy VII Remake (2020) (Palmer)
- Final Fantasy VII Rebirth (2024) (Palmer)
- Kingdom Hearts II (2005) (Rabbit)
- Kinnikuman Nisei: Legend Choujins vs. New Generation Choujins (xxxx) (Nakano-san)
- Kinnikuman Generations (xxxx) (Nakano-san)
- Kinnikuman Muscle Generations (xxxx) (Nakano-san)
- Kinnikuman Muscle Grand Prix Max (xxxx) (Nakano-san)
- Klonoa 2: Lunatea's Veil (2001) (Baguji)
- Kyatto Ninden Teyandee (2027) (Karasu Gennarisai)
- Makeruna! Makendō 2 (xxxx) (Makkey)
- Metal Gear Solid 3: Snake Eater (2004) (Sokolov)
- Persona 3 Reload (2024) (Bunkichi Kitamura)
- Policenauts (1996) (Jun Ishida)
- R's Study (Rの書斎, R no Shosai) (xxxx) (Mr. R, The Devil)
- Shining Force EXA (2007) (Garyu)
- Sonic the Hedgehog (series) (xxxx) (Bean the Dynamite)
- Spyro The Dragon (xxxx) (Dragon Voice)
- Tales of Phantasia: Narikiri Dungeon X (xxxx) (Albert)
- Tales of the World: Radiant Mythology (xxxx) (Ganser)
- Tengai Makyou III-Namida (xxxx) (Ichimonshi)
- Xenoblade Chronicles 2 (2017) (Cole)

=== Japanese voice-over ===
- Junior High Science (xxxx) (中学生理科 Chūgakusei Rika, on NHK) (Narrator)

=== Tokusatsu ===
- Gekisou Sentai Carranger (1996) (DD Donmo (Ep. 26))
- Hyakujuu Sentai Gaoranger (2002) (New Year's Org (Ep. 46))
- Tokusou Sentai Dekaranger (2004) (Poppenian Haimaru (Ep. 36))
- Mahou Sentai Magiranger (2005) (Hades Beastman Gaston the Thief (Ep. 25))
- GoGo Sentai Boukenger (2006) (Tsukumogami Kawazugami (Ep. 9))
- Ultra Galaxy Mega Monster Battle: Never Ending Odyssey (2008-2009) (Alien Guts (Eps 2 and 10))
- Kaizoku Sentai Gokaiger (2011) (Zakyura (Ep. 33))
- Ressha Sentai ToQger (2014) (Tombstone Shadow (Ep. 39))
- Tetsuwan Tantei Robotack (xxxx) (Might Burn, Mighty Wonder)
- X-Bomber (xxxx) (Bigman Lee)

=== CD drama ===
- Itazura na Kiss (xxxx) (Irie Papa)
- Madara Tenshō-hen (xxxx) (Jato)

=== Dubbing roles ===
==== Live-action ====
- Christopher Robin (Rabbit)
- Twin Dragons (Tarzan (Teddy Robin))

==== Animation ====
- Kung Fu Panda (Mister Ping)
- Shrek Forever After (Pig #1)
- Space Jam: A New Legacy (Porky Pig)
- Thomas the Tank Engine and Friends (Salty the Dockyard Diesel, Sir Handel, Farmer McColl (Season 6 only)) (Season 4–8)
- Winnie the Pooh (Rabbit) (Second voice)
