= Kōtarō Satomi =

Japanese actor (born 1936)

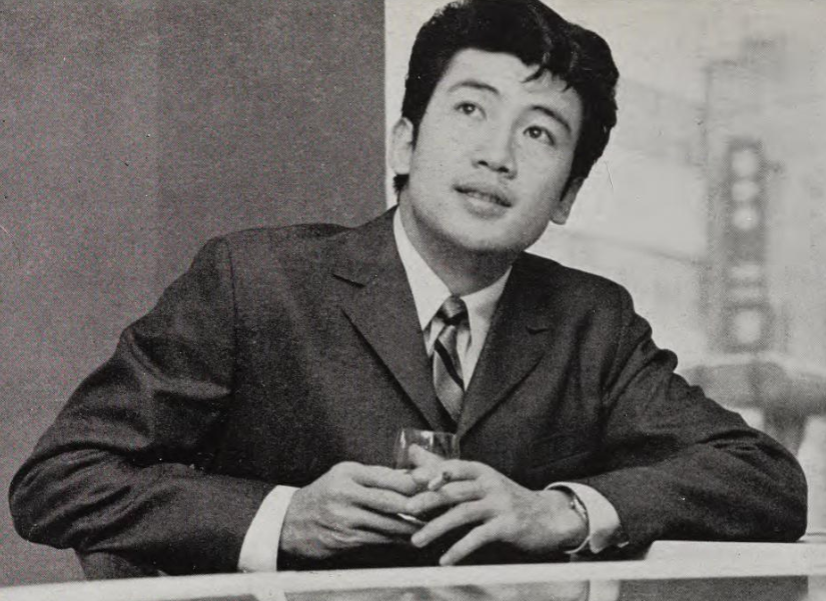
- Kōtarō Satomi (1963)
- Born: Kunitoshi Sano; 28 November 1936 (age 89); Fujinomiya, Shizuoka, Japan
- Occupation: Actor
- Years active: 1957-present
- Website: https://www.satomi-kohtaro.com/

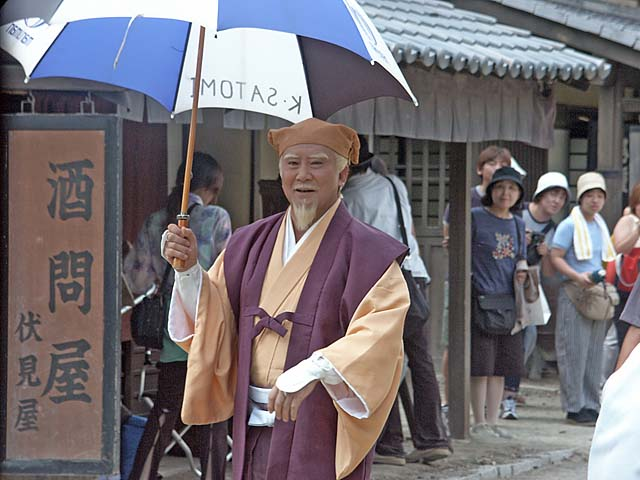
Satomi in costume as Tokugawa Mitsukuni

Kōtarō Satomi (里見浩太朗, Satomi Kōtarō; real name Kunitoshi Sano 佐野邦俊) (born 28 November 1936) is a Japanese actor from the city of Fujinomiya, Shizuoka Prefecture, Japan. In 1956, he signed with Toei film company. He appears in both contemporary roles and in the historical dramas known as jidaigeki.

== Selected filmography ==
=== Film ===
Satomi has appeared in over 130 films. Among these are

- Shinsengumi (1958)
- Kunisada Chūji (1958)
- Shinran (1960)
- Akō Rōshi (1961)
- 13 Assassins (1963) – Shinrokurō Saimada
- School Wars: Hero (2004)
- April Fools (2015)

=== Television ===
Satomi has portrayed many historical personages. Among them are Ōishi Kuranosuke, Saigō Takamori, Enomoto Takeaki, Musashibō Benkei, and Yamamoto Kansuke. In addition, he has had prominent roles in several series:

- Mito Kōmon
  - As 2nd Suke-san (Sasaki Sukesaburō) (1971–1988)
  - As 5th Tokugawa Mitsukuni (2002–2011)
- Ōedo Sōsamō (1974-1979)
- Chōshichirō Edo Nikki (1983–1991)
- Byakkotai (1986) – Saigō Tanomo
- Tabaruzaka (1987) – Saigō Takamori
- Edo o Kiru (1987, 1994)
- Homura Tatsu (1993) - Aterui, Abe no Yoritoki
- Shōgun no Onmitsu! Kage Jūhachi (1996) – Tokugawa Munetada
- Toshiie and Matsu (2002) – Uesugi Kagekatsu
- Ryōmaden (2010) – Chiba Sadakichi
- Legal High (2012–13) – Hattori
- Totto-chan! (2017) – Tatsuo Ōoka
- Slow na Bushi ni Shitekure (2019) – himself
- 13 Assassins (2020) – Doi Toshitsura
- What Will You Do, Ieyasu? (2023) – Tōyo-shōnin
- Unbound (2025) – Suwaraya Ichibei

== Selected voice roles ==
- Hercule Poirot in Agatha Christie's Great Detectives Poirot and Marple
