= Sanae Takagi =

Japanese voice actress

- 高木 早苗
- Born: May 21, 1955 (age 71); Chiba Prefecture, Japan
- Occupation: voice actress
- Years active: 1976-present
- Agent: Aoni Production
- Spouse: Naoki Tatsuta

Sanae Takagi (高木 早苗, Takagi Sanae; born May 21, 1955, in Chiba Prefecture) is a Japanese voice actress who works for Aoni Production. She is married to voice actor Naoki Tatsuta.

== Major roles ==
=== Television animation ===
- Groizer X (1976) – Midori Shimura
- Akage no An (1979) – Jane Andrews, Village Children, Sunday School Students
- Mobile Suit Gundam (1979) – Chiyo
- Space Runaway Ideon (1980) – Fard Malaka
- Miss Machiko (1981–83) – Tenko Yokohama
- Yattodetaman (1981) – Pandora
- The Flying House (1982) – Kanna Natsuyama
- Gyakuten! Ippatsuman (1982) – Michiko
- Animated Classics of Japanese Literature (1986) – Noriko Mabuchi
- Himitsu no Akko-chan (1988) – Satomi-sensei
- Sailor Moon (1992–96) – Ikuko Tsukino, Grape (ep. 24), and Hell Ant (ep. 50)
- Kinnikuman Nisei (2002) – Bibimba

=== Original video animation ===
- Casshan: Robot Hunter (1993) – Midori Higashi

=== Theatrical animation ===
- Mobile Suit Gundam I (1981) – Haro
- Mobile Suit Gundam II: Soldiers of Sorrow (1981) – Haro
- Mobile Suit Gundam III: Encounters in Space (1982) – Haro
- The Ideon: A Contact (1982) – Maraka Ford
- The Ideon: Be Invoked (1982) – Maraka Ford
- Urusei Yatsura: Only You (1983) – Planet Elle Commanders

=== Video games ===
- Persona 3 Reload (2024) – Mitsuko Kitamura

=== Dubbing ===
- Miracles (Belle Kao (Gloria Yip))
- Pinocchio's Christmas (Pinocchio (Todd Porter)
