= Ōedo Sōsamō =

Japanese television series

Ōedo Sōsamō (大江戸捜査網) and Shin Ōedo Sōsamō (新・大江戸捜査網) are long-running prime time television jidaigeki programs that originally aired from 1970 to 1992. The series was broadcast on TV Tokyo (Tokyo 12 Channel). The title literally translates as "Oedo Dragnet" ("New Oedo Dragnet" for the second series). Early on, it carried the subtitle "Ōedo Untouchables."

== Characters ==
The central characters are a ninja group who serve as secret police agents in Edo. They work undercover under the direction of a hatamoto, and later, under Matsudaira Sadanobu.

- Jūmonji Koyata, masquerading as a vagrant from Sagami, Sanjirō. The male lead, Koyata was played by Ryōtarō Sugi, Kōtarō Satomi, Hiroki Matsukata, Shirō Namiki, and Jun Hashizume.
- Isaka Jūzō, masquerading as a rōnin of the same name. Tetsurō Sagawa created the role.
- Female leads: Konami (Meiko Kaji), Yūgiri (Miyako Koshiro), Kurenai Ochō (Michiyo Yasuda), Inazuma Oryū (Sanae Tsuchida), Kazaguruma no Okiku (Yōko Natsuki), and others.

A 1979 film Onmitsu Dōshin Ōedo Sōsamō starred Hiroki Matsukata, included Toshiro Mifune in the role of Matsudaira Sadanobu.

== TV special ==
The special episode Onmitsu Doshin: Oedo Sosamo was made in 1979, guest-starring Toshirō Mifune in a rare TV role.

== Rebroadcasts ==
Jidaigeki Senmon Channel has rerun all the other 715 episodes via satellite and cable.
