= Isshin Tasuke =

Isshin Tasuke (一心太助; Japanese pronunciation: [iɕ.ɕiꜜn (|) ta.sɯ̥.ke, iꜜɕ.ɕin-]) is a fictional Japanese person. He has appeared in novels and plays, kōdan, television and film jidaigeki and other media. The earliest known appearance was in the work Ōkubo Musashi Abumi.

Brimming with the Japanese values of giri and ninjō, the fishmonger Tasuke is the epitome of the Edokko, the son of Edo. A stock character in works set during the time of the third Tokugawa shogun Iemitsu (who ruled from 1623 to 1651), he collaborates with the veteran samurai Ōkubo Hikozaemon.

Tasuke is so beloved that although fictional, he has a grave at a temple in Minato, Tokyo.

== Appearances ==
Isshin Tasuke has appeared in many works of fiction.

=== Kabuki ===
In kabuki, Tasuke is a character in Medashi Yanagi Midori no Matsumae (芽出柳翠緑松前).

=== Film ===
The dozen works with Tasuke's name in the title include the 1930 Chiezō Kataoka portrayal in the Nikkatsu film Isshin Tasuke, directed by Hiroshi Inagaki. Akira Kurosawa wrote the screenplay for the 1945 Appare Isshin Tasuke starring Kenichi Enomoto (directed by Kiyoshi Saeki for Toho). Kabuki actor Kinnosuke Nakamura (Yorozuya) starred in five of a series of six movies for Toei (Katsuo Nakamura portrayed the hero in the other).

== Television ==
Three series and two specials have featured Tasuke in their titles. These aired on TBS (1969, 52 episodes starring Tarō Yamada), Fuji (1971, 25 episodes, starring Ryōtarō Sugi), Asahi (ANB) (1989, a New Year special starring Tōru Nakamura), Nippon Television (1990, a special with Morio Kazama), and NHK (1999, 24 episodes on Friday evening prime time) with Naoto Ogata as Tasuke.

== Song ==
Isshin Tasuke is in the titles of three enka. Ichirō Toba sang Bungo no Isshin Tasuke. Mitsuko Nakamura recorded Mitsuko no Isshin Tasuke. Tarō Yamada (who starred in the television series) released Otoko! Isshin Tasuke.
