= Tōyama Kagemoto =

Samurai (1793–1855)

- 遠山景元
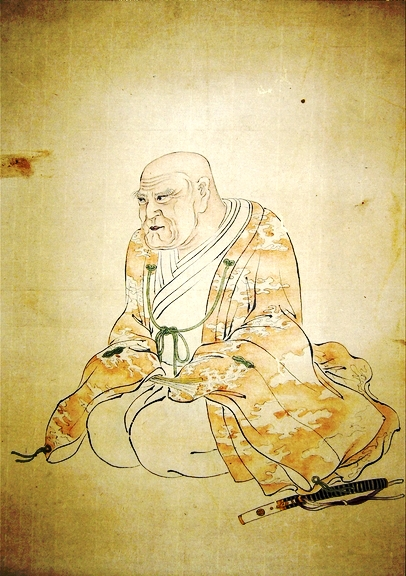
- Died: April 15, 1855 (aged 61)
- Title: Hatamoto

Tōyama Kagemoto (Japanese: 遠山景元; September 27, 1793 – April 15, 1855) was a hatamoto and an official of the Tokugawa shogunate during the Edo period of Japanese history. His ancestry was of the Minamoto clan of the Mino Province. His father, Kagemichi, was the magistrate of Nagasaki.

== Biography ==
During his youth, Kagemoto departed from his household due to family conflict, and started a life among commoners as a vagabond. It was during this period of time that he supposedly got a tattoo, uncommon for a magistrate. When he inherited the title of his household, he returned to his samurai post and eventually became a bugyō. Kagemoto held the posts of Finance Magistrate, North Magistrate, and subsequently South Magistrate of Edo.

When the Tokugawa Shogunate instituted the Tenpō Reforms, South Magistrate Torii Yōzō and Rōjū Mizuno Tadakuni tried to enforce sumptuary edicts banning theatre and other popular entertainment. Kagemoto opposed the implementation of the policy, which he believed to be an undue infringement on the livelihood of commoners.

Kagemoto's youth won him tremendous popularity among the people of Edo. In 1843, he was ousted from his position as North Magistrate through the machinations of Torii, and although nominally appointed Ōmetsuke, he was without any meaningful power. Two years later, when Mizuno ousted Torii, Tōyama received an appointment as South Magistrate, a post once held by Ōoka Tadasuke.

Tōyama rose to the Lower Junior Fifth rank with the name Tōyama Saemon no Jō.

== In fiction ==
In kabuki and kōdan, he was celebrated under his childhood name of Kinshirō, or popularly, Tōyama no Kin-san (Mr. Kin of Toyama). The common theme is the image of a magistrate with a flashy cherry blossom tattoo on his shoulder who fights against corrupt officials and greedy merchants in defense of the ordinary people. The novelist Tatsurō Jinde (陣出達郎) wrote a series of books about Kin-san. Noted actor Chiezō Kataoka starred in a series of eighteen Toei jidaigeki films about him. Several Japanese television networks have aired series based on the character. These portrayed him pretending to be a petty hood or a yojimbo while solving crimes as the chief of police.
