= Mito Kōmon =

Japanese television series, 1969–2011

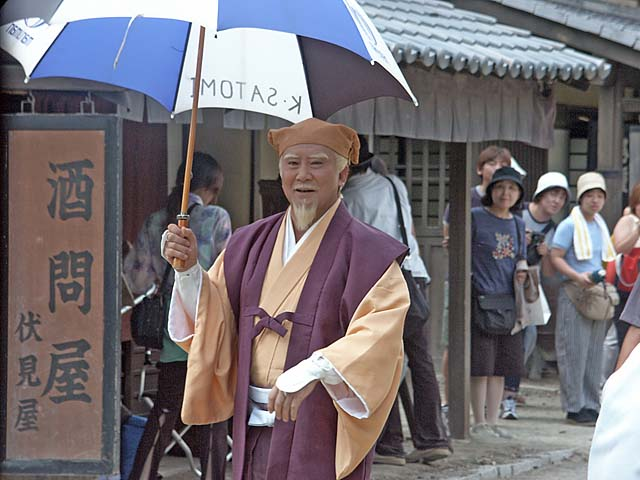
- Satomi Kōtarō on set in the role of Mitsuemon
- Country of origin: Japan
- No. of episodes: 1,227

Production
- Running time: 54 minutes
- Production company: C.A.L.

Original release
- Network: JNN (ABC (1969–1975), MBS (1975–2011), TBS)
- Release: 4 August 1969 – 19 December 2011

Mito Kōmon (水戸黄門; Japanese pronunciation: [mʲì.tó̞ | kò̞ó̞.mó̞ɴ́, -tó̞ (|) kó̞ó̞-]) is a Japanese jidaigeki or period drama that was on prime-time television from 1969 to 2011, making it the longest-running jidaigeki in Japanese television history. The title character is the historic Tokugawa Mitsukuni, former vice-shōgun and retired second daimyō of the Mito Domain. In the guise of Mitsuemon, a retired crepe merchant from Echigo, he roams Japan with two samurai retainers, fun-loving Sasaki Sukesaburō (Suke-san) and studious Atsumi Kakunoshin (Kaku-san). An episode typically starts with some injustice perpetrated by a corrupt official, a wealthy merchant, or a gangster. The travelers arrive incognito, discover the injustice and quietly investigate it. The episode concludes with a brawl in which the unarmed, disguised protagonists defeat a crowd of samurai and gangsters, culminating in the presentation of the inrō that reveals the hero's identity. Afterwards, the hero passes judgement on the villains, sets things straight with comments and encouragement, and then continues with his journey.

The drama was adapted into a film in 1978.

== History and characters ==
Five actors have portrayed the lead character in the series. Eijirō Tōno created the part and appeared in 13 seasons. His successor was Kō Nishimura. Asao Sano followed and then Kōji Ishizaka took the role in two seasons, quitting for cancer treatments. Kōtarō Satomi played Mitsuemon from 2002 until the end of the series in 2011.

The character normally sports a pointed white beard. He wears the lavish garb of a wealthy retiree and carries a walking stick (a staff), which also serves as his defensive weapon in combat.

Singer-actor Ryōtarō Sugi was the series' first Suke-san, followed by Kōtarō Satomi, who many years later took over the lead role. Teruhiko Aoi was next, then Yūji Kishimoto, and Ryūji Harada. Opposite them, Tadashi Yokouchi, Shin'ya Ōwada, Goro Ibuki, Jundai Yamada, and Masashi Gōda have played Kaku-san. Ichiro Nakatani played Kazaguruma no Yashichi, a ninja who helped Mitsuemon. Evil characters who tried to kill Mitsuemon were played by such actors as Shigeru Tsuyuguchi (1st season) and Mikio Narita (3rd season).

In each of the show's 43 seasons, various other regular characters joined the retinue. For many years, they included the food-loving commoner Hachibei, the reformed thieves Kazaguruma no Yashichi (a former ninja whose main weapon is a shuriken with pinwheel, with a dagger as his sidearm) and his wife Kasumi no Oshin, the ninja Tsuge no Tobizaru portrayed by Masaki Nomura, and kunoichi Kagerō Ogin. Portrayed by Kaoru Yumi, Ogin was the lead character in a light-hearted spinoff, Mito Kōmon Gaiden Kagerō Ninpō-chō. The same actress took on a new role, Hayate no Oen.

Many former regular actors appeared in the show's gala 1000th special episode, which aired on December 15, 2003. A 1978 film distributed by Toei Company shared the cast, production crew, and title.

The TBS network aired the show throughout Japan, and showed reruns on both its analogue stations and its CS satellite channel. The last episode aired on December 19, 2011.

There was also an animated adaptation called Manga Mito Kōmon (まんが水戸黄門) that aired during 1981–1982, animated by Knack Productions.

== Cast ==
Season 1–2

- Eijirō Tōno as Mito Kōmon
- Ryōtarō Sugi as Sasaki Sukesaburō (Sukesan)
- Tadashi Yokouchi as Atsumi Kakunoshin (Kakusan)
- Ichirō Nakatani as Kazaguruma no Yashichi
- Gentarō Takahashi as Ukkari Hachibei (Season 2)
- Yumi Iwai as Miyuki (Kakusan's wife)
- Keiko Yumi as Ochō (Season 1)
- Shigeru Tsuyuguchi as Furukawa Hyōgo (Season 1)
- Eiko Itō as Horie Kikue (Season 2)
- Kunio Murai as Horie Shin'nojō (Season 2)
- Reiko Ōhara as Yayoi (Season 2)
- Kantarō Suga as Hiruma Denpachirō (Season 2)

Season 3–8

- Eijirō Tōno as Mito Kōmon
- Kōtarō Satomi as Sasaki Sukesaburō (Sukesan)
- Tadashi Yokouchi as Atsumi Kakunoshin (Kakusan)
- Ichirō Nakatani as Kazaguruma no Yashichi
- Junko Miyazono as Kasumi no Oshin (Yashichi's wife)
- Gentarō Takahashi as Ukkari Hachibei
- Yumi Iwai as Miyuki (Kakusan's wife) (Season 3–4, 6)
- Seiya Nakano as Yogarasu no Tōkichi (Season 3)
- Mikio Narita as Tsuge Kyūtarō (Season 3)
- Tadao Nakamaru as Yamada Sazen (Season 4)
- Eiji Gō as Tendō Genshin (Season 4)
- Kaori Kobayashi as Princess Anri (Season 5)
- Bin Amazu as Tenrakan Genryū (Season 5)
- Hiromi Murachi as Oharu (Season 7)

Season 9–13

- Eijirō Tōno as Mito Kōmon
- Kōtarō Satomi as Sasaki Sukesaburō (Sukesan)
- Shin'ya Ōwada as Atsumi Kakunoshin (Kakusan)
- Ichirō Nakatani as Kazaguruma no Yashichi
- Junko Miyazono as Kasumi no Oshin (Yashichi's wife) (Season 9, 13)
- Izumi Yamaguchi as Onozuka Shino (later, Sasaki Shino, Sukesan's wife)
- Gentarō Takahashi as Ukkari Hachibei
- Kumiko Shimizu as Omiyo (Season 11)
- Kazue Itō as Chizuru (Season 12)
- Noriko Shirasaka as Yumi (Season 13)
- Kōichi Miura as Fukurō no Sagenta (Season 13)

Season 14–17

- Kō Nishimura as Mito Kōmon
- Kōtarō Satomi as Sasaki Sukesaburō (Sukesan)
- Goro Ibuki as Atsumi Kakunoshin (Kakusan)
- Ichirō Nakatani as Kazaguruma no Yashichi
- Junko Miyazono as Kasumi no Oshin (Yashichi's wife)
- Izumi Yamaguchi as Sasaki Shino (Sukesan's wife)
- Gentarō Takahashi as Ukkari Hachibei
- Kaoru Yumi as Kagerō Ogin (Season 16-)
- Mitsuo Senda as Kemuri no Matahei (Season 16, 17)
- Masaki Nomura as Tsuge no Tobizaru (Season 17-)
- Yuka Katayama as Yuki Shibata (Season 14)
- Nagisa Katahira as Princess Aya (Season 15)
- Mari Torigoe as Kaori (Season 16)
- Masaharu Ichimura as Ryūjinbō (Season 16)
- Koichi Uenoyama as Senjobō (Season 16)
- MIE as Kurenai Oren (Season 17)
- Mayumi Hasegawa as Chiharu (Season 17)
- Katsumasa Uchida as Kurotani no Dōki (Season 17)

Season 18–21

- Kō Nishimura as Mito Kōmon
- Teruhiko Aoi as Sasaki Sukesaburō (Sukesan)
- Goro Ibuki as Atsumi Kakunoshin (Kakusan)
- Ichirō Nakatani as Kazaguruma no Yashichi
- Junko Miyazono as Kasumi no Oshin (Yashichi's wife)
- Gentarō Takahashi as Ukkari Hachibei
- Kaoru Yumi as Kagerō Ogin
- Masaki Nomura as Tsuge no Tobizaru
- Airin as Reika (Season 18)
- Nobuo Kawai as Genryū (Season 18)
- Reiko Nakamura as Hiryū (Season 18)
- Akira Hamada as Seiryū (Season 18)
- Kusuo Kita as Donryū (Season 18)
- Mayumi Yoshino as Princess Yuki (Season 19)
- Ai Yasunaga as Chizuru (Season 19)
- Kyoichi Satō as Chōkaibō (Season 19)
- Masaru Shiga as Chōjibō (Season 19)
- Shoichi Yamamoto as Kigenbō (Season 19)
- Naomi Hosokawa as Princess Aya (Season 20)

Season 22–28

- Asao Sano as Mito Kōmon
- Teruhiko Aoi as Sasaki Sukesaburō (Sukesan)
- Goro Ibuki as Atsumi Kakunoshin (Kakusan)
- Ichirō Nakatani as Kazaguruma no Yashichi
- Junko Miyazono as Kasumi no Oshin (Yashichi's wife) (Season 22–26)
- GentarōTakahashi as Ukkari Hachibei
- Kaoru Yumi as Kagerō Ogin
- Masaki Nomura as Tsuge no Tobizaru
- Miyuki Nakano as Andō Yuri (Season 22)
- Kotarō Ryu as Otowa no Koyata (Season 22)
- Rui Nishio as Kanbō (Season 22)
- Masashi Ishibashi as Shuryō (Season 22)
- Katsumasa Uchida as Ryūjinbō (Season 22)
- Hitoshi Ōmae as Senjōbō (Season 22)
- Kaori Koshiba as Kaori (Season 23)
- Yoshimi Ashikawa as Kurenai Oren (Season 23)
- Shizuka Iori as Shizuka (Season 24)
- Ryūji Sawa as Ashura no Genki (Season 24)
- Seiichiro Kameishi as Kureya no Rasetsu (Season 24)
- Hitoshi Ōmae as Donryū (Season 24)
- Ai Sasamine as Matsudaira Saya (Season 27)
- Asuka Morinaga as Ochiyo (Season 27)
- Yuki Kawarazaki as Tonomura Hisase (Season 27)
- Yukiko Someya as Princess Tae (Season 27)
- Ban Kojika as Kakizaki Yodayū (Season 27)

Season 29–30

- Kōji Ishizaka as Mito Kōmon
- Yūji Kishimoto as Sasaki Sukesaburō (Sukesan)
- Jundai Yamada as Atsumi Kakunoshin (Kakusan)
- Kaoru Yumi as Hayate no Oen
- Asuka Shimizu as Sen
- Yurika Kodama as Mitsu
- Aya Onoe as Hide
- Korokke as Suppa no Jirōbō
- Mariko Kaga as Orui

Season 31

- Kōtarō Satomi as Mito Kōmon
- Yūji Kishimoto as Sasaki Sukesaburō (Sukesan)
- Jundai Yamada as Atsumi Kakunoshin (Kakusan)
- Kaoru Yumi as Hayate no Oen
- Kaneko Iwasaki as Yae
- Shōei as Kaze no Oniwaka
- Akira Saitō as Aki

Season 32–41

- Kōtarō Satomi as Mito Kōmon
- Ryūji Harada as Sasaki Sukesaburō (Sukesan)
- Masashi Gōda as Atsumi Kakunoshin (Kakusan)
- Kaoru Yumi as Hayate no Oen
- Kaneko Iwasaki as Yae (-Season 37)
- Shōei as Kaze no Oniwaka (-Season 37)
- Akira Saitō as Aki (-Season 37)
- Toyokazu Minami as Yorozuya no Senta (Season 33–35)
- Tento Matsui as Okera no Shinsuke (Season 36–39)
- Maju Ozawa as Yamauchi Shiho (Season 38)
- Takashi Naitō as Kazaguruma no Yashichi (Season 38-)
- Sayaka Isoyama as Yamanobe Satsuki (Season 39)
- Sanpei Hayashiya as Chakkari Hachibei (Season 40-)
- Yōko Mitsuya as Ochiyo (Seaseon 40)
- Masaki Izawa as Shinkichi (Season 41)
- Mikio Ōsawa as Kokumu Gensai (Season 41)
- Hidekazu Ichinose as Tōjō Hayato (Season 41)

Season 42–43

- Kōtarō Satomi as Mito Kōmon
- Mikihisa Azuma as Sasaki Sukesaburō (Sukesan)
- Koji Matoba as Atsumi Kakunoshin (Kakusan)
- Akiko Hinagata as Kaede
- Sanpei Hayashiya as Hachibei
- Takashi Naitō as Kazaguruma no Yashichi

== Film cast ==
- Eijirō Tōno as Mito Kōmon
- Kōtarō Satomi as Sukesaburō (Sukesan)
- Shinya Owada as Atsumi Kakunoshin (Kakusan)
- Gentaro Takahashi as Hachibei
- Ichirō Nakatani as Kazaguruma no Yahichi
- Kōji Wada as Genpachiro Tsurugi
- Komaki Kurihara as Yumi Okumura
- Toshiro Mifune as Sakuzaemon Okumura
- Hajime Hana as Rokubei
- Hitoshi Ueki as Sukehachi
- Yoshio Inaba as Sasaya
- Tatsuo Endō as Yadayu Kurobe
- Nobuo Kawai as Hankuro Kosaka
- Toru Abe as Mondo Murai

== Bibliography ==
- Schilling, Mark (1997). "Mito Komon". The Encyclopedia of Japanese Pop Culture. New York: Weatherhill. pp. 135–138. ISBN 0-8348-0380-1.
