= 1982 in animation =

Events in 1982 in animation.

== Events ==
=== March ===
- March 24: René Laloux' Les Maîtres du temps premieres.
- March 29: 54th Academy Awards: Crac by Frédéric Back wins the Academy Award for Best Animated Short Film.

=== April ===
- April 8: The first episode of Patalliro! is broadcast.

=== May ===
- May 14–26 May: 1982 Cannes Film Festival: Pink Floyd: The Wall premieres which features animated sequences by Gerald Scarfe.
- May 20: The Dr. Seuss special The Grinch Grinches the Cat in the Hat is broadcast.
- May 24: The Peanuts special A Charlie Brown Celebration is broadcast. Which it includes several stories with one or two-word titles, was later adapted for the Saturday morning CBS series, The Charlie Brown and Snoopy Show, which premiered a year later.
- May 27: Rumen Petkov's Treasure Planet premieres.

=== June ===
- June 29: The first episode of The Mysterious Cities of Gold is broadcast.

=== July ===
- July 2: Don Bluth's debut film The Secret of NIMH premieres. This became Bluth's well-proclaimed film of all time. It received a sequel 16 years later and became an overwhelmed disappointment.
- July 15: Japanese animation studio Anime International Company is founded.

=== August ===
- August 5: American animators go on strike to protest runaway productions. Strike ends on October 16.

=== September ===
- September 18: The first episode of The Gary Coleman Show is broadcast, an animated series based on popular actor Gary Coleman. It became an adult interest decades later.
- September 21: Piotr Kamler's Chronopolis premieres.
- September 30: Arlene Klasky and Gábor Csupó co-found the animation studio Klasky Csupo.

=== October ===
- October 1:
  - Ralph Bakshi's Hey Good Lookin' premieres. It was originally made as a live action film since 1975, but was put in obscurity after Warner Bros. refused to distribute it from the Coonskin incident and made into an animated film.
  - Tim Burton's Vincent is first released.
- October 4: The first episode of SuperTed is broadcast.
- October 9: The first episode of Once Upon a Time... Space is broadcast.
- October 21: Martin Rosen's The Plague Dogs premieres. This animated adaptation is famous for its inclusion of the bloody gunshot sequence.
- October 25: The first television special based on Jim Davis's comic strip Garfield, Here Comes Garfield premieres on CBS.

=== November ===
- November 19:
  - Friz Freleng's anthological Looney Tunes film Bugs Bunny's 3rd Movie: 1001 Rabbit Tales premieres in theaters. Despite it being directed by Freleng, it also contained shorts directed by Chuck Jones & Robert McKimson.
  - The film Heidi's Song is first released, based on the 1881 novel Heidi by Johanna Spyri.
  - Arthur Rankin Jr. and Jules Bass' The Last Unicorn is released. It becomes a cult classic in later years in spite of gaining some infamy for the unexpected swearing and other mature themes installed in a G-rated film at its time.

=== December ===
- December 24: The first episode of Monica and Friends is broadcast, based on the popular Brazilian comics series Monica's Gang.
- December 26: The Snowman, a Christmas special, is first broadcast, and will become an annually repeated classic.

=== Specific date unknown ===
- Eduard Nazarov's Once Upon a Dog is first released.

== Films released ==
- January 16–23 - Miss Switch to the Rescue (United States)
- January 23 - Gauche the Cellist (Japan)
- February 7 - Naniwabushi Daisuki (Japan)
- February 17 - I Am a Cat (Japan)
- March 13:
  - Aladdin and the Magic Lamp (Japan)
  - Doraemon: Nobita and the Haunts of Evil (Japan)
  - Kaibutsu-kun: Demon no Ken (Japan)
  - Mobile Suit Gundam III: Encounters in Space (Japan)
  - Ohayō! Spank (Japan)
  - Queen Millennia (Japan)
- March 20 - Zō no Inai Dōbutsuen (Japan)
- March 24 - Les Maîtres du temps (France, Switzerland, West Germany, United Kingdom, and Hungary)
- March 31 - Urusei Yatsura: Haru da, Tobidase! (Japan)
- April 1 - Adventures of Robinson Crusoe, a Sailor from York (Czechoslovakia)
- April 6 - The Flying Windmill (East Germany)
- April 24:
  - Haguregumo (Japan)
  - Sengoku Majin GōShōgun (Japan)
- April 29 - Dr. Poppen and the Swamp of No Return (Japan)
- May - Chronopolis (France and Poland)
- May 5:
  - Hokseongnoboteu Sseondeo A (South Korea)
  - Shiroi Kiba White Fang Monogatari (Japan)
  - Two Down Full Base (Japan)
- May 24 - A Charlie Brown Celebration (United States)
- May 27 - Treasure Planet (Bulgaria)
- June 17 - Son Gokuu Silk Road wo Tobu!! (Japan)
- July 1 - The Wizard of Oz (Japan)
- July 2 - The Secret of NIMH (United States)
- July 3 - Space Adventure Cobra: The Movie (Japan)
- July 9 - Tron (United States)
- July 10:
  - Dr. Slump: "Hoyoyo!" Space Adventure (Japan)
  - The Ideon: A Contact (Japan)
  - The Ideon: Be Invoked (Japan)
- July 28 - Space Pirate Captain Harlock: Arcadia of My Youth (Japan)
- July 15 - Pink Floyd – The Wall (United Kingdom)
- August 1 - Super Taekwon V (South Korea)
- August 3 - Shalom Pharao (West Germany)
- August 7 - Techno Police 21C (Japan)
- August 17 - The Flight of Dragons (United States and Japan)
- August 18 - Syupeo samchongsa (South Korea)
- August 21:
  - Flash Gordon: The Greatest Adventure of All (United States)
  - Star of the Giants (Japan)
- August 22:
  - Adrift in the Pacific (Japan)
  - Andromeda Stories (Japan)
- September 30 - Schooltime Blues (Hungary)
- October 1 - Hey Good Lookin' (United States)
- October 6 - Shōnen Miyamoto Musashi – Wanpaku Nitō-ryū (Japan)
- October 9 - Pro Golfer Saru (Japan)
- October 21 - The Plague Dogs (United Kingdom and United States)
- October 24 - Tsushima Maru: Sayonara Okinawa (Japan)
- October 30 - Future War 198X (Japan)
- November 19:
  - Bugs Bunny's 3rd Movie: 1001 Rabbit Tales (United States)
  - Heidi's Song (United States)
  - The Last Unicorn (United States, United Kingdom, and Japan)
- December 3:
  - Attack of the Super Monsters (Japan)
  - Mafalda (Argentina)
- December 10 - Mighty Mouse in the Great Space Chase (United States)
- December 15 - Oliver Twist (Australia)
- December 18:
  - God Mars: The Movie (Japan)
  - Syupeo Majingga 3 (South Korea)
- December 21 - Heungnyongwanggwa Bihodongja (South Korea)
- December 22 - A Christmas Carol (Australia)
- December 23 - The Adventures of Monica and Her Friends (Brazil)
- December 24 - Ai no Kiseki: Doctor Norman Monogatari (Japan)
- Specific date unknown:
  - Autumn (Soviet Union)
  - Haedori daemoheom (South Korea)
  - Old Master Q: Water Tiger Tale (Hong Kong)
  - Sarah (Australia)

== Television series ==
- January 4 - Sankokushi debuts in syndication.
- January 10 - Lucy of the Southern Rainbow debuts on TV Tokyo.
- January 25 - Asari-chan debuts on TV Asahi.
- February 6 - Combat Mecha Xabungle debuts on ANN, Nagoya TV, and TV Asahi.
- February 7 - Naniwabushi Daisuki debuts in syndication.
- February 13 - Gyakuten! Ippatsuman debuts on Fuji TV.
- March 3 - Kikou Kantai Dairugger XV debuts on MegaTON (TV Tokyo).
- March 18 - Magical Princess Minky Momo debuts on TV Tokyo.
- April 5:
  - Don Dracula and The Flying House debut on TV Tokyo.
  - Game Center Arashi debuts on NTV.
- April 8 - Patalliro! debuts on Fuji TV.
- April 17 - Thunderbirds 2086 debuts on Fuji TV.
- May 1 - The Mysterious Cities of Gold debuts on NHK General TV and Antenne 2.
- May 5:
  - Acrobunch debuts on Nippon Television.
  - Anime Yasei No Sakebi debuts on Tokyo 12.
- May 8 - Little Pollon debuts on Fuji TV and Italia 1.
- June 5 - Tonde Mon Pe debuts in syndication.
- July 5 - The Kabocha Wine debuts on TV Asahi.
- July 6 - Baxinger debuts on TV Tokyo.
- September 18:
  - Gilligan's Planet, Meatballs & Spaghetti, and Pandamonium debut on CBS.
  - Shirt Tales, The Flintstone Funnies, The Gary Coleman Show, and The Incredible Hulk debut on NBC.
  - The Little Rascals debuts on ABC.
- September 25: Mork & Mindy/Laverne & Shirley/Fonz Hour, Laverne & Shirley with the Fonz, Pac-Man, Scrappy and Yabba-Doo, The Pac-Man/Little Rascals/Richie Rich Show, The Puppy's Further Adventures, and The Scooby & Scrappy-Doo/Puppy Hour debut on ABC.
- October 2 - Once Upon a Time... Space debuts on FR3 and Fuji TV.
- October 3 - The Super Dimension Fortress Macross debuts on MBS.
- October 4 - Ninjaman Ippei debuts in syndication.
- October 7:
  - Robby the Rascal debuts on TV Tokyo.
  - Space Cobra debuts on Fuji TV.
  - Tokimeki Tonight debuts on Nippon Television.
- October 10 - Warrior of Love Rainbowman debuts on TBS.
- October 12 - Maya the Honey Bee debuts on TV Osaka and TV Tokyo.
- October 13 - Arcadia of My Youth: Endless Orbit SSX debuts on TBS.
- October 17 - Sasuga No Sarutobi debuts in syndication.
- November 1 - SuperTed debuts on S4C.
- November 2 - Fuku-Chan: Yokoyama Ryuichi No Kessaku Anime debuts on TV Asahi.
- November 13 - Murun Buchstansangur debuts on Channel 4.
- Specific date unknown:
  - Hitotsuboshi-Ke No Ultra BaâSan debuts in syndication.
  - Pimpa debuts on Rai 1 and Rai 2.

== Births ==
=== January ===
- January 6: Eddie Redmayne, English actor (voice of Ryan in Thomas & Friends: Sodor's Legend of the Lost Treasure, Dug in Early Man).
- January 7: Lauren Cohan, English-American actress (voice of Juliana in Archer, Julia Pennyworth in Catwoman: Hunted, Holly / War Woman in the Invincible episode "It's About Time", Maggie Greene in the Robot Chicken episode "The Robot Chicken Walking Dead Special: Look Who's Walking").
- January 10:
  - Josh Ryan Evans, American actor (voice of Third Grader in the Hey Arnold! episode "Big Gino", Small Boy and Lottsatot #2 in the Rugrats episode "No Place Like Home"), (d. 2002).
  - Misato Fukuen, Japanese actress (voice of Sailor Chibi-Moon in Sailor Moon Crystal, Elicia Hughes in Fullmetal Alchemist: Brotherhood, Eve in Black Cat, Himiko Toga in My Hero Academia, Miyuki Hoshizora / Cure Happy in Smile PreCure!).
- January 13: Dayci Brookshire, American actress (voice of Jessica and Dressy in The Epic Tales of Captain Underpants, Apple in Home: Adventures with Tip & Oh, young Zatanna in the Justice League Action episode "Trick or Threat").
- January 20: Sara Gunnarsdóttir, Icelandic director, animator and artist (The Diary of a Teenage Girl, My Year of Dicks).
- January 24: Daveed Diggs, American actor and musician (voice of Norath Kev in Star Wars Resistance, Helen in Central Park, Command Tysess in Star Trek: Prodigy, Cyborg in DC League of Super-Pets).
- January 29: Adam Lambert, American musician and actor (voice of Emperor Maximus in Playmobil: The Movie, Machiavillain in the Megamind franchise).

=== February ===
- February 1: Jarrett Lennon, American former child actor (voice of Kenny Fowler in 2 Stupid Dogs, Eugene Horowitz in season 1 of Hey Arnold!, young Ed Grimley in The Completely Mental Misadventures of Ed Grimley episode "The Irving Who Came to Dinner").
- February 2: Nick Cofrancesco, American production coordinator (Nickelodeon Animation Studio, Family Guy, Curious George), television writer (The Mighty B!) and producer (Mattel Television).
- February 7:
  - Cory Doran, Canadian voice actor and director (voice of Jimmy in Jimmy Two-Shoes, Andrew Baumer in Stoked, Mike in the Total Drama franchise, Dabio in Wild Kratts, George in George of the Jungle, Noah in Total DramaRama, Cranky in Thomas & Friends).
  - Matty Matheson, Canadian chef and actor (voice of Dr. Nutcase in Toy Story 5, Cookie Bobby in Gabby's Dollhouse: The Movie, Sauce Boss in the Big City Greens episode "Freebie Frenzy", Keef in the Craig of the Creek episode "The New Jersey").
- February 8: Danny Tamberelli, American actor, comedian, and musician (voice of Arnold Perlstein in The Magic School Bus, Joseph Anza in Fillmore!).
- February 10: Terence Nance, American filmmaker, writer, director, actor and musician (Space Jam: A New Legacy).
- February 16: Chris Jai Alex, American actor (voice of Panthro in ThunderCats Roar, Esidisi in JoJo's Bizarre Adventure, Pedro in A Silent Voice, Lord Boros in One-Punch Man, Nickes and Bopobo in Hunter x Hunter, Orga Sabnak in Mobile Suit Gundam SEED, additional voices in Steven Universe).

=== March ===
- March 3: Jessica Biel, American actress (voice of Neera in Planet 51, Brooke in Family Guy, herself in BoJack Horseman, the Johnny Bravo episode "Johnny Bravo Goes to Hollywood", and the Scooby-Doo and Guess Who? episode "The Lost Mines of Kilimanjaro!").
- March 10: Thomas Middleditch, Canadian actor, comedian and screenwriter (voice of the title character in Penn Zero: Part-Time Hero, Harold Hutchins in Captain Underpants: The First Epic Movie, Lester in Henchmen, Alex in Bob's Burgers, Donny Tinselton and Bash in Big City Greens, Garnoz in Phineas and Ferb the Movie: Candace Against the Universe, Terry in Solar Opposites, Professor Fartsparkles in the Bravest Warriors episode "Time Slime", Tommy Lipnip in the Rick and Morty episode "The ABC's of Beth", Warlock and Caller in the TripTank episode "TripTank 2025", Simon in the Animals episode "Rats.").
- March 11: Robbie Daymond, American voice actor (voice of Tuxedo Mask in the Viz Media dub of Sailor Moon, Spider-Man in Marvel Disk Wars: The Avengers, Avengers Assemble and Spider-Man, Jesse Cosay in Infinity Train, Raymond in OK K.O.! Let's Be Heroes, Timber Wolf in Legion of Super-Heroes, Eighth Brother in the Star Wars Rebels episode "Twilight of the Apprentice", Cerkonos in The Legend of Vox Machina episode "Pass Through Fire").
- March 18: Adam Pally, American actor (voice of Sage in Archibald's Next Big Thing, Party Horse in Regular Show, Kit Cloudkicker in the DuckTales episode "The Lost Cargo of Kit Cloudkicker!", Linus in the Solar Opposites episode "The Pupa's Big Day", Mesk in the Star Trek: Lower Decks episode "Hear All, Trust Nothing").
- March 20: Erica Luttrell, Canadian actress (voice of Keesha Franklin in The Magic School Bus, Candy in Dave the Barbarian, Sapphire in the Steven Universe franchise, young Doctor Fate in the Justice League Action episode "Trick or Threat").
- March 21: Santino Fontana, American actor and singer (voice of Hans in Frozen, Petru in the Vampirina episode "Phantom of the Auditorium").
- March 22: Constance Wu, American actress (voice of Daphne Blake in Velma, the Mayor of Ninjago in The Lego Ninjago Movie, Molly in Next Gen, Mom in Wish Dragon).
- March 25: Jenny Slate, American actress and comedienne (voice of Dawn Bellwether in Zootopia, Princess Pony Head in Star vs. the Forces of Evil, Gidget in The Secret Life of Pets and The Secret Life of Pets 2, Miss Nanny in Muppet Babies, Tammy Larsen in Bob's Burgers, Harley Quinn in The Lego Batman Movie).
- March 28: Flula Borg, German actor and musician (voice of Mega Fat CEO Baby in The Boss Baby: Back in Business, Dickory in Trolls World Tour, Robotman in Teen Titans Go!, Alfons in Rapunzel's Tangled Adventure, Maybe in Ralph Breaks the Internet, Ziegler in the Archer episode "Danger Island: A Warrior in Costume").
- March 31: Brian Tyree Henry, American actor (voice of Jefferson Davis in Spider-Man: Into the Spider-Verse and Spider-Man: Across the Spider-Verse, Megatron in Transformers One, Dancarino in Vivo, Cooper Wallace Jr. and Strib in the BoJack Horseman episode "The Amelia Earhart Story", Armando in HouseBroken, Elijah/Chief in Big Mouth).

=== April ===
- April 1: Taran Killam, American actor, comedian and writer (portrayed Jim McNaughton in Teenage Mutant Ninja Turtles, voice of Skip in Underdogs, Frantic in The Awesomes, the title character in Nature Cat, John Kimble, Indiana Jones and Tyler Durden in the Robot Chicken episode "Ext. Forest Day", Charles Willoughby-Wentworth in the We Bare Bears episode "Adopted", Glen Tangier in The Simpsons episode "Bart the Bad Guy", Ichabod in the Vampirina episode "A Tale of Two Hollows").
- April 3: Cobie Smulders, Canadian actress (voice of Wonder Woman in The Lego Movie and The Lego Movie 2: The Second Part, Nature Dog in Nature Cat, Anni in the Animals episode "Flies.", Hydrangea in The Simpsons episode "Bart the Bad Guy", Maria Hill in What If...? and Moon Girl and Devil Dinosaur).
- April 4: Justin Cook, American voice actor, director, audio engineer and line producer (voice of Yusuke Urameshi in Yu Yu Hakusho).
- April 5: Hayley Atwell, English-American actress (voice of Peggy Carter in Avengers Assemble and What If...?, Zadra in 3Below: Tales of Arcadia, Lara Croft in Tomb Raider: The Legend of Lara Croft).
- April 9: Jay Baruchel, Canadian actor (voice of Hiccup Horrendous Haddock III in the How to Train Your Dragon franchise, Dr. Tillage in The Magic School Bus Rides Again episode "Ghost Farm", Fucknel in Trailer Park Boys: The Animated Series).
- April 15: Seth Rogen, Canadian actor (voice of Mantis in the Kung Fu Panda franchise, B.O.B. in Monsters vs. Aliens, the title character in Paul, Pumbaa in The Lion King, Frank in Sausage Party, Bob in Chip 'n Dale Rescue Rangers, Donkey Kong in The Super Mario Bros. Movie) and producer (Sausage Party, Teenage Mutant Ninja Turtles: Mutant Mayhem, Invincible, The Boys Presents: Diabolical).
- April 19:
  - Cassandra Lee Morris, American voice actress (voice of Kyubey in Puella Magi Madoka Magica, Saki Mikajima in Durarara!!, Leafa in Sword Art Online, Calaveras and Cere-Cere in the Viz Media dub of Sailor Moon, Rachel Larsen / Glitter Diamond in Glitter Force Doki Doki, Kiazuki in Hanazuki: Full of Treasures, Sabrina Raincomprix and Pollen in Miraculous: Tales of Ladybug & Cat Noir, Liv Baker / Myst in Ghostforce, Leif in Amphibia).
  - Ali Wong, American actress and comedian (voice of Bertie in Tuca & Bertie, Ali in Big Mouth, Becca in Human Resources, Betty in The Angry Birds Movie, Olivia in The Lego Ninjago Movie, Felony in Ralph Breaks the Internet, Jentry Chau in Jentry Chau vs. the Underworld, Citrus Twisty in the OK K.O.! Let's Be Heroes episode "Soda Genie", Maddy in the BoJack Horseman episode "Escape from L.A.", Dana in the Animals episode "Rats.").
- April 24: Kelly Clarkson, American singer, songwriter, author and television personality (voice of Leah in The Star, Moxy in UglyDolls, Delta Dawn in Trolls World Tour, herself in the King of the Hill episode "Stressed for Success" and the Phineas and Ferb episode "A Phineas and Ferb Family Christmas").
- April 28: Harry Shum Jr., American actor (voice of Brainiac 5 in the Tomorrowverse, Takayoshi in Blue Eye Samurai, Rawda in the Star Trek: Lower Decks episode "A Mathematically Perfect Redemption").
- April 30: Kirsten Dunst, American actress (voice of young Anastasia in Anastasia, Kiki in Kiki's Delivery Service).

=== May ===
- May 11: Cory Monteith, Canadian actor and musician (voice of Finn Hudson in The Cleveland Show episode "How Do You Solve a Problem Like Roberta?", voiced himself in The Simpsons episode "Elementary School Musical"), (d. 2013).
- May 15: Tatsuya Fujiwara, Japanese actor (voice of Light Yagami in Death Note, Japanese dub voice of Kuzco in The Emperor's New Groove).
- May 16:
  - Melissa Altro, Canadian actress (voice of Muffy Crosswire in Arthur, Gretchen in Camp Lakebottom, Sally in Dex Hamilton: Alien Entomologist, Paige Logan in Grossology, the title character in Pippi Longstocking).
  - Tiya Sircar, American actress (voice of Sabine Wren in Star Wars Rebels, Miss Flores in Spirit Riding Free, Dolphin in Young Justice, Erin in The Simpsons episode "Uncut Femmes").
- May 20: Donald Reignoux, French actor (French dub voice of Carl Wheezer in The Adventures of Jimmy Neutron, Boy Genius, Kevin Levin in the Ben 10 franchise, the title character in Danny Phantom, Louie in Quack Pack and DuckTales, Phineas Flynn in Phineas and Ferb, Kristoff in the Frozen franchise, Numbuh 4 in Codename: Kids Next Door, Brainiac 5 in Legion of Super Heroes, T.J. Detweiler in Recess, Robin in Young Justice, Once-ler in The Lorax, Tai Kamiya in the Digimon franchise, Shinji Ikari in Neon Genesis Evangelion).
- May 25:
  - Esmé Bianco, English actress and neo-burlesque performer (voice of Queen Eclipsa in Star vs. the Forces of Evil).
  - Fryda Wolff, American voice actress (voice of Jade in Bratz, Faora in Justice League Action, Enchantress in Avengers Assemble, Dahlia in Kipo and the Age of Wonderbeasts, the Collector in The Owl House, DJ Suki in Trolls: The Beat Goes On!).

=== June ===
- June 8: Thomas Hobson, American actor (voice of Shout in Fresh Beat Band of Spies).
- June 19: Michael Yarmush, American-Canadian actor (original voice of the title character in Arthur).
- June 29:
  - Matthew Mercer, American actor (voice of Jotaro Kujo in JoJo's Bizarre Adventure: Stardust Crusaders, Leorio Paladiknight in Hunter x Hunter, Levi in Attack on Titan, Prince Dimande in Sailor Moon, Iron Man in Marvel Disk Wars: The Avengers, Trafalgar Law in One Piece, Ivan Bruel in season 1 of Miraculous: Tales of Ladybug & Cat Noir, Rhino in Spider-Man, Tygra in ThunderCats, Cokey Brian in Close Enough).
  - Colin Jost, American comedian, actor (portrayed Ben in Tom & Jerry) and television writer (Kappa Mikey).
- June 30: Lizzy Caplan, American actress (voice of Reagan Ridley in Inside Job, Debbie in American Dad!, Patty Donner in The Cleveland Show episode "The Essence of Cleveland").

=== July ===
- July 8:
  - Pendleton Ward, American animator, writer, (creator of Adventure Time and Bravest Warriors), and voice actor (voice of Lumpy Space Princess and Abraham Lincoln in the former).
  - Sophia Bush, American actress (voice of Karen / Voyd in Incredibles 2, Sara in the Phineas and Ferb episode "Phineas and Ferb Get Busted!").
- July 15: Takahiro Fujiwara, Japanese voice actor (voice of Mokoena and Alan in Jormungand, Security Guard in Aikatsu!, Fortitudo in Bayonetta: Bloody Fate, Dwalla in Outbreak Company, Chandragupta in Nobunaga the Fool, Besub in Gaist Crusher, Setter in Captain Earth, Lu Gonghu in The Irregular at Magic High School, Ekichi Nebuya in Kuroko's Basketball, Ojisan in Attack on Titan, King Baum and Charlotte Basskarte in One Piece, Funamishi in Boruto, Orc in Eden's Zero, Kurogiri/Fourth Kind in My Hero Academia, Japanese dub voice of Marshmallow in Frozen), (d. 2026).
- July 24:
  - Elisabeth Moss, American actress (voice of Holly in Frosty Returns, Katrina in Animaniacs, Arisia Rrab in Green Lantern: Emerald Knights, Michelle in Once Upon a Forest, Kimmy Ventrix in the Batman: The Animated Series episode "See No Evil", Kathy in the Freakazoid! episode "Candle Jack", Gretchen in The Simpsons episode "Labor Pains").
  - Anna Paquin, Canadian-New Zealand actress (voice of Ramsey in The Good Dinosaur, Sheeta in Castle in the Sky, Kristen in the Phineas and Ferb episode "The Curse of Cadence").
- July 29: Allison Mack, American actress (voice of Tiffany Nickle in The Ant Bully, Power Girl in Superman/Batman: Public Enemies, Clea in The Batman episode "The Everywhere Man").
- July 30:
  - Brandon Scott, American actor (voice of Alex in Milo Murphy's Law, Kohut in Wreck-It Ralph, Hendershot in The Boss Baby: Back in Business).
  - Yvonne Strahovski, Australian actress (voice of Kate Kane in Batman: Bad Blood, Stralyan in Rapunzel's Tangled Adventure).

=== August ===
- August 10: Vincent Rodriguez III, American actor (voice of Jeff in The Ghost and Molly McGee, Ansel Beauregard in Arlo the Alligator Boy and I Heart Arlo).
- August 13: Sebastian Stan, Romanian-American actor (voice of Bucky Barnes in What If...?).
- August 16: Todd Haberkorn, American actor (voice of Natsu Dragneel in Fairy Tail, Jadeite in the Viz Media dub of Sailor Moon, Italy in Hetalia: Axis Powers, Hikaru Hitachiin in Ouran High School Host Club, Allen Walker in D.Gray-man, Death the Kid in Soul Eater, Tsukune Aono in Rosario + Vampire, Kimihiro Watanuki in xxxHolic, Yamato Akitsuki in Suzuka, Galileo in Power Players, Xavier Ramier in Miraculous: Tales of Ladybug & Cat Noir, Tetrax, Solar Twain, Grey Matter, and Slapback in Ben 10).
- August 19: Melissa Fumero, American actress (voice of Antonia in Elena of Avalor, Melissa Tarleton in M.O.D.O.K., Starla in the She-Ra and the Princesses of Power episode "Stranded", Cantaloupe Sinclair in the Big City Greens episode "Dolled Up").
- August 20: Jamil Walker Smith, American actor, director, producer and writer (voice of Gerald Johanssen in Hey Arnold!).
- August 22: Aparna Nancherla, American actress and comedienne (voice of Hollyhock in BoJack Horseman, Nephrite and Jades in Steven Universe, Quiet in Orion and the Dark, Nisha in Hoppers).
- August 25: Benjamin Diskin, American voice actor (voice of Junior in Problem Child, Numbuh 1 and Numbuh 2 in Codename: Kids Next Door, Kai Miyagusuku in Blood+, Venom in The Spectacular Spider-Man, Flash Thompson in Spider-Man, the title character in Stitch!, Gurio Umino in the Viz Media dub of Sailor Moon, Gonzo and Rizzo the Rat in Muppet Babies, Skeletor in He-Man and the Masters of the Universe, Skaar in Ultimate Spider-Man and Hulk and the Agents of S.M.A.S.H., Spider-Ham and Morbius in Ultimate Spider-Man, Nino Lahiffe, Max Kanté, Nooroo, Sass, and Butler Jean in Miraculous: Tales of Ladybug & Cat Noir, various characters in Young Justice).
- August 26: John Mulaney, American comedian, actor, writer, and producer (voice of Spider-Ham in Spider-Man: Into the Spider-Verse, Chip in Chip 'n Dale: Rescue Rangers, Jack Horner in Puss in Boots: The Last Wish, Andrew Glouberman in Big Mouth and Human Resources, Warburton Parker in The Simpsons, Olafur and Mackerel in the Animals episode "Pigeons").
- August 30: Bill Chernega, American film editor (Eon Kid, Wow! Wow! Wubbzy!, Dante's Inferno: An Animated Epic, Sesame Street), software developer (Dead Space: Downfall, Dan Vs.) and production assistant (Turok: Son of Stone).
- August 31: Raven Molisee, American animator, storyboard artist (Ed, Edd n Eddy, WildBrain Studios, Steven Universe, The Hollow, Rainbow Butterfly Unicorn Kitty, The Wonderful World of Mickey Mouse) and writer (Steven Universe).

=== September ===
- September 1: Michael Adamthwaite, Canadian voice actor (voice of Jay in Ninjago, Sergeant Night in Mega Man: Fully Charged, Zenblock in Supernoobs, Colossus in X-Men: Evolution, Justin Hammer in Iron Man: Armored Adventures).
- September 10: Bret Iwan, American actor (fourth official voice of Mickey Mouse).
- September 13:
  - J.G. Quintel, American animator, storyboard artist (Cartoon Network Studios, Phineas and Ferb), writer, director and producer (creator and voice of Mordecai and Hi-Five Ghost in Regular Show, Josh in Close Enough).
  - Giles Panton, Canadian actor (voice of Flash Magnus in My Little Pony: Friendship Is Magic, Clay Morrington in Nexo Knights, Keith in Voltron Force).
- September 15: Evan Goldberg, Canadian screenwriter (The Simpsons, Sausage Party, The Boys Presents: Diabolical), director and producer (Sausage Party, Santa Inc., Invincible, The Boys Presents: Diabolical).
- September 22: Katie Lowes, American actress (voice of Candlehead in Wreck-It Ralph and Ralph Breaks the Internet, Abigail Callaghan in Big Hero 6, Commander Ladnok in Voltron: Legendary Defender, Becky in Vivo).
- September 27: Anna Camp, American actress (voice of Chevron in Harvey Girls Forever!, Ivy in Sofia the First, Pixie Empress in the Star vs. the Forces of Evil episode "Pixtopia").
- September 30:
  - Lacey Chabert, American actress (voice of Eliza Thornberry in The Wild Thornberrys, Meg Griffin in season 1 of Family Guy, Gwen Stacy in The Spectacular Spider-Man, Zatanna in Young Justice and Justice League Action, Vitani in The Lion King franchise, Tanya in An American Tail: The Treasure of Manhattan Island and An American Tail: The Mystery of the Night Monster, singing voice of young Anastasia in Anastasia).
  - Kieran Culkin, American actor (voice of Wallace Wells in Scott Pilgrim Takes Off, Peter in Long Live the Royals, Glen Kumstein in Solar Opposites, Dr. Plowp in The Second Best Hospital in the Galaxy, Dr. Riley in #1 Happy Family USA, Gabriel Wolf in the Agent Elvis episode "Godspeed, Drunk Monkey", Ref Mazos in the Teenage Euthanasia episode "A Waist-Down Ghost Town Shut Down", Alexander "Hub" Hubley in The Simpsons episode "Guess Who's Coming to Skinner", Wormius in the Krapopolis episode "Number Twos", O.D. in The Boys Presents: Diabolical episode "I'm Your Pusher", Squealer in Animal Farm).

=== October ===
- October 3: Erik von Detten, American actor (voice of Sid Phillips in the Toy Story franchise, Erwin Lawson in Recess, Flynt in the Tarzan franchise, Vic in the Aaahh!!! Real Monsters episode "The Switching Hour", Shovin' Buddy in the Family Guy episode "Peter's Progress", Chan in the Avatar: The Last Airbender episode "The Beach").
- October 10: Dan Stevens, English actor (voice of Admiral Hornagold in The Sea Beast, Scarlemagne in Kipo and the Age of Wonderbeasts, Charles and Phillip in The Prince, continued voice of Korvo in Solar Opposites).
- October 15: Lane Toran, American actor and musician (voice of Arnold in season 1 of Hey Arnold!, Tripod in 101 Dalmatians: The Series, King Bob in Recess, Fred in As Told by Ginger, Newsboy and Kid in the Aaahh!!! Real Monsters episode "The Great Escape", Cool Kid in the Rocket Power episode "Home Sweet Home", TJ and Slacker Kid in the All Grown Up! episode "Tweenage Tycoons").
- October 19:
  - Gillian Jacobs, American actress (voice of Samantha in Invincible, Dakota in Ten Year Old Tom, Rosalind and Katherine in Long Live the Royals, Sta'abi in Monsters vs. Aliens, Roxy Rocket in the Justice League Action episode "The Fatal Fare").
  - Bryce Pinkham, American actor (voice of Stolas in Helluva Boss).
- October 23: Bradley Pierce, American actor and producer (voice of Chip in Beauty and the Beast, Nibs in Return to Never Land, Flounder in The Little Mermaid, Tails in Sonic the Hedgehog).

=== November ===
- November 1: Michaela Dietz, American actress (voice of Amethyst in the Steven Universe franchise, Vee in The Owl House, Daryll McGee in The Ghost and Molly McGee, Blue Behemoth in Kid Cosmic, Danelda in Mighty Magiswords, Dolly in 101 Dalmatian Street).
- November 12: Anne Hathaway, American actress (voice of Haru Yoshioka in The Cat Returns, Red in Hoodwinked!, Jewel in Rio and Rio 2, Jenny in The Simpsons, herself in the Family Guy episode "April in Quahog").
- November 18: Damon Wayans Jr., American actor and comedian (voice of Wasabi in Big Hero 6).
- November 28: Adam McArthur, American actor (voice of Marco Diaz in Star vs. the Forces of Evil, Chad in The Adventures of Puss in Boots, Lee-Char in Star Wars: The Clone Wars, Yuji Itadori in Jujutsu Kaisen, Koku Hanabata / Trumpet in My Hero Academia).
- November 29: Gemma Chan, English actress (voice of Namaari in Raya and the Last Dragon, Kurma in Hotel Transylvania: The Series, Dewdrop in Watership Down, Professor Kwark in the Thunderbirds are Go episode "Icarus").

=== December ===
- December 8: Nicki Minaj, Trinidadian musician and actress (voice of Sugilite in Steven Universe, Steffie in Ice Age: Continental Drift, Pinky in The Angry Birds Movie 2).
- December 24: Robert Schwartzman, American musician and member of Rooney (performed the theme song of Iron Man: Armored Adventures).
- December 29: Alison Brie, American actress (voice of Unikitty in The Lego Movie franchise, Diane Nguyen in BoJack Horseman, Natsumi Suga in Weathering with You, Aftershock in the Moon Girl and Devil Dinosaur episode "Moon Girl Landing", Planetina in the Rick and Morty episode "A Rickconvenient Mort").

=== Specific date unknown ===
- Kristie Marsdan, Canadian actress (voice of Fraw Bow in Mobile Suit Gundam, Madame Masque in Iron Man: Armored Adventures).

== Deaths ==
=== January ===
- January 2: Fred Harman, American animator, cartoonist, and illustrator (Kansas City Film Ad Company, business partner of Walt Disney) dies at age 79.
- January 5: Hans Conried, American actor (voice of George Darling and Captain Hook in Peter Pan, Snidely Whiplash in Dudley Do-Right, Wally Walrus in Woody Woodpecker), dies at age 64.
- January 11: Paul Lynde, American comedian and voice actor (voice of Templeton in Charlotte's Web, Mildew Wolf in Cattanooga Cats, Claude Pertwee in Where's Huddles?, Sylvester Sneekly/The Hooded Claw in The Perils of Penelope Pitstop), dies at age 55.

=== February ===
- February 12: Victor Jory, Canadian-American actor (narrator in Tubby the Tuba), dies at age 79.

=== March ===
- March 12: Ken Harris, American animator and film director (Warner Bros. Cartoons, Walt Disney Productions, United Productions of America, DePatie-Freleng Enterprises, Hanna-Barbera), dies at age 83.

=== April ===
- April 8: James Whitney, American film director (Five Film Exercises, Lapis, Yantra), dies at age 60.
- April 25: Don Wilson, American announcer and actor (narrator in Ferdinand the Bull, voiced himself in The Mouse that Jack Built), dies at age 81.

=== June ===
- June 11: Al Rinker, American musician (The Aristocats), dies at age 74.
- June 14: Marjorie Bennett, Australian actress (voice of Duchess in One Hundred and One Dalmatians), dies at age 86.

=== July ===
- July 2: Jack Bogle, American animator and comics artist (Pat Sullivan (Felix the Cat), Van Beuren Studios, Walt Disney Company), dies at age 81.
- July 6: Warren Tufts, American comics artist, animator and voice actor (Cambria Studios, Hanna-Barbera) dies at age 56 in an airplane crash.

=== August ===
- August 9: Alexandre Alexeieff, Russian animator, film director (The Nose, Pictures at an Exhibition), inventor (pinscreen) and producer, dies at age 81.
- August 13: Joe E. Ross, American actor (voice of Oxx in The Adventures of Robin Hoodnik, Botch in Help!... It's the Hair Bear Bunch!, Sergeant Flint in Hong Kong Phooey, Officer Gunther Toody in the Wait Till Your Father Gets Home episode "Car 54", Roll in CB Bears, Daniel in No Man's Valley), dies at age 68.
- August 17: Barney Phillips, American actor (voice of the title character in Shazzan!, Porthos in The Three Musketeers, King Neptune in The Popeye Valentine's Day Special - Sweethearts at Sea, Pere David in No Man's Valley), dies at age 68.

=== October ===
- October 30: Tim Davis, American actor (voice of Adolescent Thumper and Flower in Bambi), dies at age 58.

=== November ===
- November 25: Hugh Harman, American animator, (co-founder of Warner Bros. Cartoons and the Metro-Goldwyn-Mayer cartoon studio, Looney Tunes, Merrie Melodies, Happy Harmonies), dies at age 79.

=== Specific date unknown ===
- Dan Noonan, American animator and comics artist (Terrytoons, Walt Disney Company, Filmation, Hanna-Barbera), dies at age 71.

== See also ==
- 1982 in anime
