= Ideon =

Ideon may refer to:

- The Japanese anime series Space Runaway Ideon
  - List of Space Runaway Ideon episodes
  - List of Space Runaway Ideon characters
- Ideon Science Park, a development in Lund, Sweden
