= Pamela Ribon =

American screenwriter, author and actress

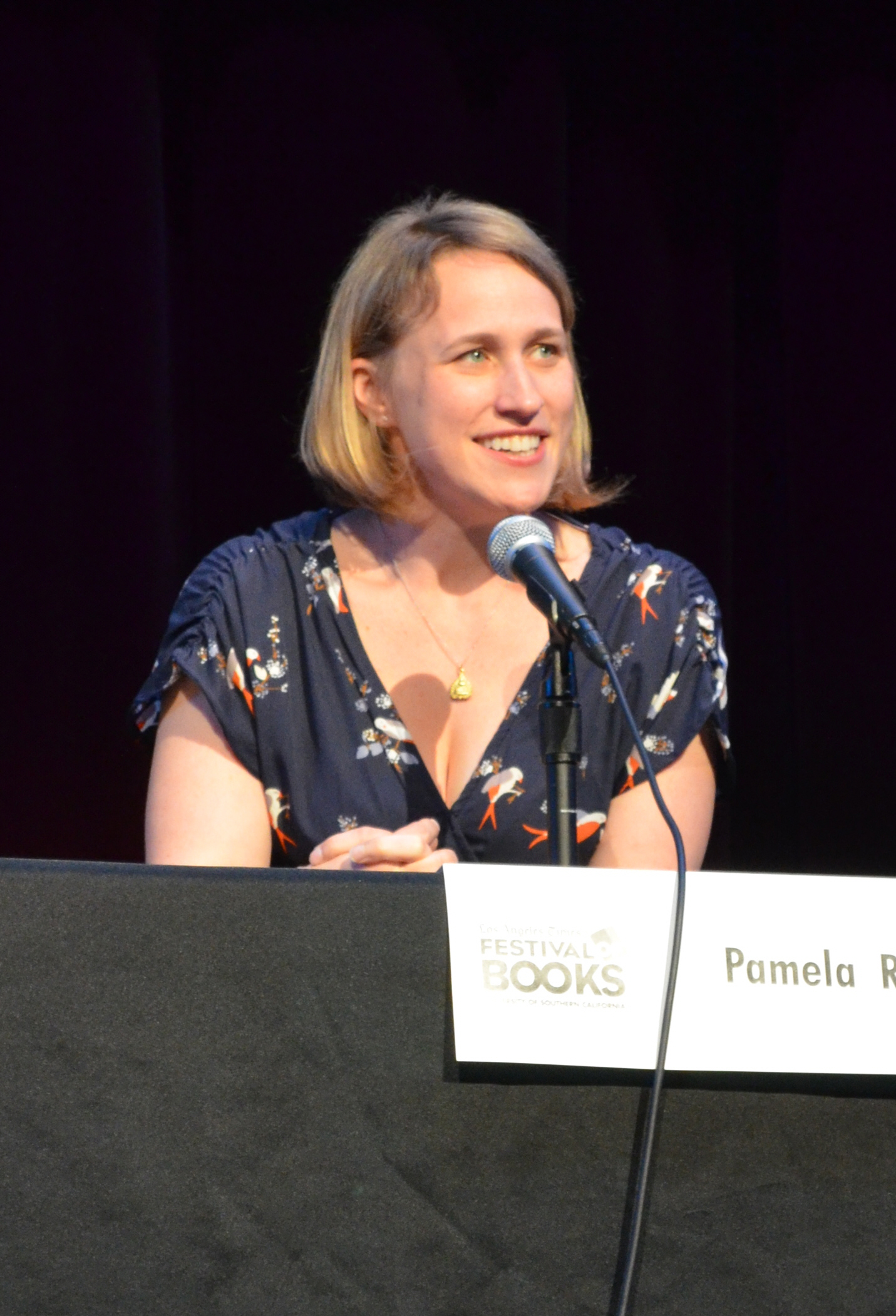
- Pamela Ribon at the Los Angeles Times Festival of Books in 2012
- Born: April 4, 1975 (age 51); Bloomsburg, Pennsylvania, U.S.
- Education: University of Texas at Austin
- Occupations: Screenwriter; author; filmmaker; blogger; actress
- Spouse(s): Stephen Falk (m. 2005; div. 2009) Jason W. Upton
- Children: 1
- Website: www.pamie.com

Pamela Ribon (born April 4, 1975) is an Academy Award-nominated American screenwriter, author, filmmaker, blogger, and actress. Her work includes the television series Samantha Who? and the animated films Moana, Ralph Breaks the Internet, and Nimona. She created and wrote the animated short film My Year of Dicks (2022), adapted from her memoir Notes to Boys (And Other Things I Shouldn't Share In Public), and she and director Sara Gunnarsdóttir were nominated for the Academy Award for Best Animated Short Film. Ribon also founded pamie.com and was an early contributor to Television Without Pity.

== Education and Austin career ==
Ribon earned a Bachelor of Fine Arts in acting from the University of Texas at Austin in 1997. While an undergraduate, she wrote and directed several works selected for Hyde Park Theatre's FronteraFest Best of the Fest, including LOL (Connected) in 1998. She also performed, wrote, and directed shows with Monks' Night Out, an alternative sketch and improvisational comedy troupe that served as the house troupe at The Velveeta Room, and later directed several spin-off troupes and showcases.

Ribon also directed Los Paranoias, an audition troupe organized through Monks' Night Out. During the third Big Stinkin' International Improv & Sketch Comedy Festival in 1998, Los Paranoias appeared on two festival programs, and Ribon served as an emcee for a separate showcase at the Velveeta Room.

In July 1999, Ribon and Matt Sadler presented one-person shows in a Hyde Park Theatre double bill titled Oh, Grow Up! That September, she performed her one-person show Slumber Party at MOMFest; her professional website identifies the work as a 1999 showcase for U.S. Comedy Arts Festival consideration.

Ribon began creating webpages in 1994 and launched the online diary Squishy at pamie.com in June 1998, partly as daily writing practice for her sketch comedy work. By 2000, The Austin Chronicle reported that the diary attracted about 15,000 readers each day. At the time, Ribon was also writing a weekly column for the Austin American-Statesman's Technopolis section, performing with Monks' Night Out, doing freelance English-language anime dubbing, and writing television recaps for Mighty Big TV. The profile reported that she was preparing to move from Austin to Los Angeles later that year.

== Writing and screen career ==
After leaving Austin for Los Angeles, Ribon pursued work in television while continuing to write for the internet and perform onstage. Her first novel, Why Girls Are Weird, was published in 2003 and was loosely based on pamie.com. She also created and directed Call Us Crazy: The Anne Heche Monologues, an unauthorized stage satire based on Heche's autobiography. The production played at the Hudson Avenue Theatre in Hollywood in 2003. Her two-person show Letters Never Sent, created with Liz Feldman, was later showcased at the 2005 HBO US Comedy Arts Festival in Aspen.

Ribon subsequently wrote for television comedies including Mind of Mencia, Hot Properties, and Samantha Who?, while continuing to publish novels and develop film and television adaptations of her work. In 2014, an essay she published at pamie.com criticizing the children's book Barbie: I Can Be a Computer Engineer helped inspire the online campaign #FeministHackerBarbie. Mattel subsequently apologized for the book's portrayal of Barbie and said that future titles would present the character as empowered.

Her work expanded into feature animation and comics during the 2010s. Ribon worked for approximately two years writing on Moana (credited for creating the basis for Gramma Tala, giving Moana a connection to her ancestors), before co-writing Ralph Breaks the Internet. For the latter film, she conceived and wrote the sequence bringing the Disney Princesses together, recorded their preliminary dialogue during production, and remained as the voice of Snow White in the completed film. She also created the graphic novel My Boyfriend is a Bear, the acclaimed roller-derby comic series Slam!, and wrote issues of Rick and Morty. In 2017, Film Independent selected her for its Directing Lab with her feature project Standby. In 2019, her commencement address for the University of Texas' College of Fine Arts was praised by Texas Monthly.

Ribon was among the writers credited with the story of the animated film Nimona (2023). The film was nominated for the Academy Award for Best Animated Feature.

Ribon wrote, created, and performed in the animated short film My Year of Dicks (2022), adapted from her memoir Notes to Boys (And Other Things I Shouldn't Share In Public) and directed by Sara Gunnarsdóttir. The film received Special Jury Recognition for Unique Vision in Writing and Directing at the 2022 SXSW Film Festival and won the Cristal for a TV Production at the Annecy International Animation Film Festival. Ribon and Gunnarsdóttir were subsequently nominated for the Academy Award for Best Animated Short Film. In 2023, Ribon was one of the three inaugural recipients of Film Independent's Changemaker Award, recognizing alumni whose work and support for other storytellers had made an impact on the industry and its community.

== Filmography ==
Year	Title	Notes
2005	Mind of Mencia	writer
2005	Hot Properties	staff writer
2006	Mind of Mencia	producer
2007–2009	Samantha Who?	story editor
2010	Romantically Challenged	consultant
2014	Bears	narration consultant
2016	Moana	story writer
2017	Smurfs: The Lost Village	writer
2018	Ralph Breaks the Internet	screenwriter, story writer, voice of Snow White
2020	Tiny World	co-writer, season 001, episode 001 "Savannah"
2022	My Year of Dicks	creator, writer, voice, adapted from her memoir
2023	Nimona	story by, additional screenplay materials
TBA	Emily the Strange	writer

== Bibliography ==
- Slam: The Next Jam! original comic series co-created with Veronica Fish (2018) Boom! Studios
- My Boyfriend is a Bear original graphic novel co-created with Cat Farris (2018) Oni Press
- Rick and Morty: "Summer's Eve", Issue #32, (2017) Oni Press
- Slam! original comic series co-created with Veronica Fish (2016) Boom! Studios
- Rick and Morty: "Ready Player Morty", Issue #11, (2016) Oni Press
- Notes to Boys (And Other Things I Shouldn't Share In Public) (2014) (ISBN 1940207053), memoir, Rare Bird Books
- True Tales of Lust and Love (2014) (ISBN 159376538X), anthology, "How I May Have Just Become the Newest Urban Legend"
- You Take It from Here (2012) (ISBN 1451646232), novel, Gallery Books, Simon & Schuster
- Going in Circles (2010) (ISBN 1416503862), novel, Downtown Press, Simon & Schuster
- It's a Wonderful Lie: 26 Truths About Life in Your Twenties (2007) (ISBN 044669777X), anthology, "I Can't Have Sex With You"
- Why Moms Are Weird (2006) (ISBN 1-4165-0385-4), novel, Downtown Press, Simon & Schuster, developed into a sitcom for Watson Pond Productions, 20th Century Fox, and American Broadcasting Company, 2006. Developed into a sitcom for ABC Family, 2010–2011.
- Girls' Night Out (2006) (ISBN 0-373-89579-8), anthology, "What Happens Next"
- Cold Feet (2005) (ISBN 1-4165-0754-X), anthology, "Sara King Goes Bad", Downtown Press, Simon & Schuster
- Bookmark Now: Writing in Unreaderly Times (2005) (ISBN 0-465-07844-3), anthology, "Look The Part"
- Why Girls Are Weird (2003) (ISBN 0-7434-6980-1), novel, Downtown Press, Simon & Schuster, developed into a screenplay for Robert Cort Productions, 2003.

== Anime writer/voice actor ==
- City Hunter: The Motion Picture (1998) — Voice of Kaori Makimura for American Dub, ADV Films
- City Hunter: .357 Magnum (1999) — Voice of Kaori Makimura for American Dub, ADV Films
- City Hunter: Bay City Wars (1999) — Voice of Kaori Makimura for American Dub, ADV Films
- City Hunter: Million Dollar Conspiracy (2000) — Voice of Kaori Makimura for American Dub, ADV Films
- City Hunter: The Secret Service (2000) — Voice of Kaori Makimura for American Dub, ADV Films
- Rurouni Kenshin: The Motion Picture (2001) — Voice of Children for American Dub, ADV Films
- Lost Universe — Writer of American Dub, ADV Films
- Trouble Chocolate — Writer of American Dub, VIZ Media
- Project ARMS — Co-Writer of American Dub (episodes 27–52), VIZ Media
