= 1982 in anime =

The events of 1982 in anime.

== Releases ==
Released	Title	Type	Studio	Director	Ref
10 January	Lucy of the Southern Rainbow	TV series	Nippon Animation	Hiroshi Saitō	
23 January	Gauche the Cellist	Film	Oh! Production	Isao Takahata	
25 January	Asari-chan	TV series	Toei Animation	Kazumi Fukushima	
6 February	Combat Mecha Xabungle	TV series	Nippon Sunrise	Yoshiyuki Tomino	
13 February	Gyakuten! Ippatsuman	TV series	Tatsunoko Productions	Hiroshi Sasagawa	
3 March	Armored Fleet Dairugger XV	TV series	Toei Animation, Daewon Animation	Kozo Morishita	
13 March	Aladdin and the Wonderful Lamp	Film	Toei Animation	Yoshikatsu Kasai	
13 March	Asari-chan Ai no Marchen Shōjo	Short film	Toei Animation		
13 March	Doraemon: Nobita and the Haunts of Evil	Film	Shin-Ei Animation	Hideo Nishimaki	
13 March	Kaibutsu-kun Demon Sword	Film	Shin-Ei Animation	Hiroshi Fukutomi	
13 March	Mobile Suit Gundam III: Encounters in Space	Film	Nippon Sunrise	Yoshiyuki Tomino	
13 March	Ohayō! Spank	Film	TMS Entertainment	Shigetsugu Yoshida	
13 March	Queen Millennia	Film	Toei Animation	Masayuki Akehi	
18 March	Magical Princess Minky Momo	TV series	Ashi Productions	Kunihiko Yuyama	
5 April	Don Dracula	TV series	Tezuka Productions	Masamune Ochiai	
5 April	The Flying House	TV series	Tatsunoko Productions	Masakazu Higuchi, Mineo Fuji	
5 April	Game Center Arashi	TV series	Shin-Ei Animation	Tameo Ogawa	
8 April	Boku Patalliro!	TV series	Toei Animation	Nobutaka Nishizawa, Daisuke Nishio	
11 April	Thunderbirds 2086 (in Japan as Scientific Rescue Team Technoboyager)	TV series	ITC Entertainment, Jin Productions		
24 April	GoShogun	Film	Ashi Productions		
24 April	Haguregumo	Film	Madhouse, Toei Animation	Mori Masaki	
5 May	Acrobunch	TV series	Kokusai Eiga-sha; TMS Entertainment	Masakazu Yasumura	
8 May	Little Pollon	TV series	Kokusai Eiga-sha	Takao Yotsuji	
29 June	The Mysterious Cities of Gold	TV series	Studio Pierrot, DIC Audiovisuel	Bernard Deyriès, Hisayuki Toriumi	
1 July	The Wizard of Oz	Film	Toho, Wiz Corporation, Topcraft	Fumihiko Takayama	
5 July	The Kabocha Wine	TV series	Toei Animation	Kimio Yabuki	
6 July	Galactic Gale Baxingar	TV series	Kokusai Eiga-sha	Takao Yotsuji	
10 July	The Ideon: A Contact	Film	Nippon Sunrise, Sanrio	Yoshiyuki Tomino	
10 July	The Ideon: Be Invoked	Film	Nippon Sunrise, Sanrio	Yoshiyuki Tomino	
23 July	Space Adventure Cobra	Film	TMS Entertainment	Osamu Dezaki	
28 July	Arcadia of My Youth	Film	Toei Company, Tōkyū Agency	Tomoharu Katsumata	
7 August	Techno Police 21C	Film	Toho, Eizo, Studio Nue	Masashi Matsumoto	
22 August	Andromeda Stories	Film	Toei Animation	Masamitsu Sasaki	
3 October	The Super Dimension Fortress Macross	TV series	Studio Nue, Tatsunoko Production, Artland	Noboru Ishiguro	
7 October	Robby the Rascal	TV series	Knack Productions	Kazuyuki Okasako	
7 October	Space Cobra	TV series	TMS Entertainment	Osamu Dezaki	
7 October	Tokimeki Tonight	TV series	Group TAC, Toho	Hiroshi Sasagawa	
10 October	Warrior of Love Rainbowman	TV series	MBS, Ai Kikaku Center	Nobuhiro Okasako	
12 October	The New Adventures of Maya the Honey Bee	TV series	Wako Productions, Apollo Film Wien	Mitsuo Kaminashi	
13 October	Arcadia of My Youth: Endless Orbit SSX	TV series	Toei Animation	Tomoharu Katsumata	
30 October	Future War 198X	Film	Toei Animation	Tomoharu Katsumata, Toshio Masuda	
18 December	Godmars	Film	Tokyo Movie Shinsha	Tetsuo Imazawa	

== See also ==
- 1982 in animation
