= True Tales of Lust and Love =

True Tales of Lust and Love is a popular monthly storytelling show where local LA comedians and writers sample their material or read from their upcoming books. It's similar in format to The Moth but features only women, some of whom read rather than perform.

According to LA Weekly, the show is curated by Anna David and features an "all-gal lineup" that has included comedians Claire Titelman and Melinda Hill. Memoirist Sascha Rothchild has also performed in the show. The Los Angeles Times included the show in its round-up of Valentine's Day ideas in 2012.

Each show is uploaded as a podcast.
