= My Year of Dicks =

- Directed by: Sara Gunnarsdóttir
- Screenplay by: Pamela Ribon
- Based on: Notes to Boys: And Other Things I Shouldn't Share in Public by Pamela Ribon
- Produced by: Jeanette Jeanenne
- Edited by: Sara Gunnarsdóttir
- Music by: Adam Blau
- Production companies: Cat's Pajamas; Wonder Killer; FXP
- Distributed by: FX
- Release date: March 13, 2022 (SXSW)
- Running time: 24 minutes
- Country: United States
- Language: English

My Year of Dicks is a 2022 American independent adult animated short film directed by Sara Gunnarsdóttir, created and written by Pamela Ribon. It was nominated for the 95th Academy Awards under the category Best Animated Short Film.

== Plot ==
It's 1991, and Pam – a stubborn, imaginative 15-year-old from the outskirts of Houston – embarks on a comedic journey of disappointment and self-discovery as she seeks the right boy to lose her virginity with so she can become the fully realized woman she's imagined herself to be.

Her first option, David, is an edgy, dramatic fellow skater who insists he's secretly a vampire. Pam's best friend, Sam, is unimpressed, but Pam is smitten by David. She invites David over to her house when her parents are away, but is disconcerted when he invites an entire party of people, including her ex. She and David make out, but David leaves in disgust after Pam reveals that she's on her period in a bid to appeal to his "vampirism." Pam's ex then admits that she was part of a bet and competition between himself and David to make out with the most girls, and Pam is outraged when she is the only girl that David didn't send an apology letter to. After learning that the bet he won was a measly sum of $2.58, she throws $5.16 at him, telling him she's worth twice that much.

Her next choice is Wally, a theater usher she's only met once, but on whom she projects feelings for after watching Henry & June. She goes to the theater with Sam, and Wally leads her away to a janitorial closet to initiate sex. Pam is disconcerted by the lack of romance and intimacy, and fights between her desperation to give in and her increasing realization that this isn't what she wants. When Wally oafishly demands they hurry up before his break ends, she leaves in embarrassment. Sam throws their concessions on the floor so that Wally will have to clean it up, and the friends happily leave the theater.

Pam dates Robert, and is thrilled by her happiness at having a nice boyfriend who loves being affectionate in public. They go to an amusement park with Sam, who is uncomfortable at their open displays of affection. Though Pam desperately tries to further her physical relationship with Robert, he continuously stops her, and it is revealed that he is secretly gay – and attracted to Sam, who politely rebuffs his attempts. Robert breaks up with Pam, who is left devastated. When she tries to make a move on Sam, he is offended and uncomfortable.

Upset at ruining her relationship with Robert and her friendship with Sam, Pam agrees to sneak out with her friend, Karina, to attend a house party. She is disturbed to find the attendees openly doing drugs, but she is impressed by one guest, Joey, a straight-edge. After Karina is dragged home by her mother, Pam is forced to sleep over at the house so that the host, Kelly, can drive her home in the morning. Joey makes a move on Pam, but after Pam reveals she's a virgin, Joey awkwardly stops and tells her that he isn't worthy to take her virginity. As Kelly drives Pam home the next morning, she casually reveals that Joey is a Neo-Nazi, which leaves Pam shocked and humiliated, and Pam graciously accepts the inevitable grounding from her parents.

While grounded, Pam spends time cleaning with her mother. After discovering her mother's love letters, Pam is impressed to think her mother was just like her in her youth, and, trying to bond, asks her mother when she lost her virginity. Her mother becomes upset and arranges "the talk" with Pam's father, who provides a frank, cynical, withering explanation of sex that horrifies and embarrasses Pam. Pam later goes to Sam's house, where she apologizes for her earlier actions and asks to be friends again. To cheer her up, Sam strips naked and reads a letter that reveals his feelings for her, assuring her that she deserves the best, and that he's in love with her. After they make up, Pam playfully piles clothes onto him and then crawls into bed with him, implying that she will finally lose her virginity in a positive situation.

== Background ==
The film was based on Pamela Ribon's 2014 comedic memoir Notes to Boys: And Other Things I Shouldn't Share in Public.

== Reception ==
=== Critical response ===
Since its release, the film has been selected for various festivals and academies around the world. The short received numerous accolades from international film festivals, including the Annecy Festival, SXSW Film Festival and the Brooklyn Film Festival and was nominated for the 95th Academy Awards under the category Best Animated Short Film.

=== Accolades ===
Year	Festivals	Award/Category	Status
2022	Annecy International Animated Film Festival	Cristal Award for Best TV Production	Won
2022	Raindance Film Festival	Best Animated Short	Won
2022	Brooklyn Film Festival	Best Animated Short	Won
2022	Animator	Best Animated Series	Won
2022	SXSW Film Festival	Special Jury recognition unique Vision in Writing and Directing	Won
2022	SXSW Film Festival	SXSW Grand Jury Award	Nominated
2022	Los Angeles Latino International Film Festival	Jury award for Best Episodic Series	Won
2022	Chicago International Film Festival	Silver Hugo Award for Best Animated Short	Won
2022	Ottawa International Animation Festival	Best Animated Series	Won
2023	Academy Awards	Best Animated Short Film	Nominated
