= Sara Gunnarsdóttir =

Icelandic filmmaker

- Citizenship: Iceland
- Occupations: Director, Animator, Artist
- Known for: The Pirate of Love, My Year of Dicks

Sara Gunnarsdóttir is an Icelandic director, animator and artist. She is mainly known for directing and animating sequences of The Diary of a Teenage Girl (2015) and for directing and animating the Oscar-nominated short film My Year of Dicks (2022).

== Career ==
In 2003, Sara received a BFA from the Icelandic Academy of the Arts. She also holds an MFA in Experimental Animation from CalArts, from which she graduated in 2012. Sara worked on Marielle Heller’s feature The Diary of a Teenage Girl and HBO’s The Case Against Adnan Sayed. Her work has been showcased at AFI Fest, SXSW, Annecy and the Telluride Film Festival.

== Filmography (selected) ==
- Sugarcube (2009) - director, animator.
- Cutthroat Roundabout (2012) (music video), song by Kira Kira - director, animator.
- The Pirate of Love (2012) - director, animator.
- Los Angeles; Westlake (2013) - director, cinematographer.
- The Diary of a Teenage Girl (2015) - animation director, animator.
- The Case Against Adnan Syed; Forbidden Love (2019) - animation director, animator.
- Nothing (2019) (music video), song by Ásgeir Trausti - director, animator.
- My Year of Dicks (2022) - director.

== Other work (selected) ==
- Feather Magnetic; Hamar (2012) (concert visuals), music by Kira Kira.

== Recognition ==
The Pirate of Love was nominated for "Best Alternative" in The academy's Student Academy Awards.

With My Year of Dicks (2022), Sara won the Special Jury Awards at SXSW for Unique Vision in Writing and Directing and was awarded the Crystal Prize for Best TV Production at Annecy Animation Film Festival.
