= List of Space Runaway Ideon episodes =

This is a list of episodes for the anime Space Runaway Ideon.

== Episodes ==
No.	Title	Original release date
1	"Resurrection of Ideon"	May 8, 1980
Humanoid aliens known as the Buff Clan discover the Earth colony planet Solo, where archeologists have found 3 large armored trucks from the 'Sixth Civilization', a long extinct alien civilization. Karala Ajiba, daughter of the Buff Clan military commander heads down to Solo along with her assistant Mayaya and is pursued by her colleagues Gije Zaral and Damido Pechi. A panicked Buff Clan soldier attacks one of the Solo excavation sites, triggering an interstellar war. Seeking cover, some of the colonists including Cosmo Yuki, Kasha Imhof, Bes Jordan and Sheryl Formosa board the armored trucks, which combine to form the god-like mecha, Ideon, which fights off the enemy.
2	"Destruction of New Lopia"	May 15, 1980
The Ideon's 3 vessels revert to their normal forms after the battle is over and are equipped with powerful weapons under the direction of Bes. Bes later runs into Karala in the woods, mistaking her for a colonist. Gije leads an attack on Solo to rescue Karala, and totally destroys Solo's capital, New Lopia. Fleeing from the attack, a group of children including a baby, Piper Lou, board the Ideon, which finds the strength to fight off the Buff Clan once again. Sheryl meanwhile heads to the second excavation site, where a giant spaceship has been discovered.
3	"Bursting Earth"	May 22, 1980
Karala is reunited with Mayaya aboard the Solo Ship. Gije and Damido request help from their commander, Abadede, and launch yet another attack on Solo in order to rescue Karala. Bes discovers that Karala and Mayaya are actually Buff Clan aliens. During the ensuing battle with the Buff Clan, the Solo Ship rises from out of the ground.
4	"Escape From Planet Solo"	May 29, 1980
As the colonists prepare to flee the planet onboard the Solo Ship, Cosmo and the others continue testing the Ideon's capabilities. Different factions within the Buff Clan argue about their next course of action, and another group launches an attack. Karala and Mayaya continue to explore in an effort to discover more about its connection to the legend of the Ide, but the ship still holds some surprises for both the Buff Clan and the colonists.
5	"Infinite Power: Legendary Ide"	June 5, 1980
The Buff Clan attack again, this time as a distraction to allow Gije to sneak aboard the Solo Ship on a rescue mission. He finds Karala and Mayaya, but the three are quickly recaptured. The colonists interrogate the Buff Clan members, and Karala explains the legend of the Ide. The Buff Clan launch yet another attack, but Karala orders a ceasefire in hopes of cooperating with the colonists to learn more about the Sixth Civilization.
6	"White Flag of Betrayal"	June 12, 1980
7	"Escape From Null Space"	June 19, 1980
8	"Battle in the Sandstorm"	June 26, 1980
9	"Burning Null Space"	July 3, 1980
10	"Surprise Attack of the Bajin"	July 10, 1980
11	"Pursuit to the Ruined Planet"	July 17, 1980
12	"Breakthrough the Enemy's Front"	July 24, 1980
13	"Attack on the Alien"	July 31, 1980
14	"Doku's Attack Strategy"	August 7, 1980
15	"Plan for Retrieving Ideon"	August 14, 1980
16	"Damido's Lethal Strategy"	August 21, 1980
17	"Battle on the Planet of the Apes"	August 28, 1980
18	"Betrayal on Ajian"	September 4, 1980
19	"Gyamose's Special Command"	September 11, 1980
20	"Battle the Twin Devils"	September 18, 1980
21	"Sink the Enemy's Battleship"	September 25, 1980
22	"The Legend Lives Again"	October 1, 1980
A clip show summary of the first 4 episodes.
23	"The Shocking Decoy Planet"	October 8, 1980
24	"Strike the Infiltrating Guerillas"	October 15, 1980
25	"Ideon's Counterattack"	October 22, 1980
26	"Deadly Fight - Fear of Gel"	October 29, 1980
27	"Infiltrate the Lunar Base"	November 5, 1980
28	"Wrath of the Wave Gun"	November 12, 1980
29	"Sparkling Swords"	November 19, 1980
30	"Desperate Sniper"	November 26, 1980
31	"Home Aflame"	December 3, 1980
32	"Amidst the Flames of Fate"	December 10, 1980
33	"Waft Area Gamble"	December 17, 1980
34	"After the Meteors Fall"	December 24, 1980
35	"Surfacing From Darkness"	December 31, 1980
36	"Farewell, Solo Ship"	January 7, 1981
The crew of the Solo Ship decide to abandon it and make a deal with Marshall Franklin such that they can take refuge and the Solo Ship will be destroyed. However shortly after departing, Franklin betrays them and sends his troops to recover the Solo Ship and disarm the bombs on board. As the Solo Ship's crew rushes back to it, a Buff Clan fleet also arrives and a three way battle ensues, in which Franklin is killed. The Solo Ship's crew fails to disarms the bombs in time, but the Ide creates a protective barrier that prevents it from being destroyed.
37	"Colony of Hatred"	January 14, 1981
The Solo Ship returns to the planet Ajian seeking refuge from the Buff Clan. Bes makes a deal with Ajian's leader, Commodore, such that the civilians of the Solo Ship will be allowed to remain on Ajian. Commodore conspires with a Buff Clan officer and instead ends up taking all of the civilians hostage, killing Sheryl's sister, Lin. Bes, Gije and the others rush back to save them and Sheryl ends up killing Commodore. Doba, unsatisfied with the performance of his officers, personally starts heading out to take on the Solo Ship and Ideon.
38	"The Space Runaway"	January 21, 1981
The Solo Ship lands on the planet Steckin Star in order to rest before yet another battle. Harulu sends her forces there and a battle ensues. During the fighting Gije is killed and the Ideon goes berserk, slicing the entire planet in half with the Ideon swords.
39	"In the Cosmos With You"	January 28, 1981
Karala and Joliver are transported to the Buff Clan flagship, the Bairal Jin. There, Karala encounters her father Doba, and reveals to him that she is pregnant with Bes's child. The Solo Ship and Ideon rush to the Bairal Jin to rescue Karala and Joliver. Although their shuttle is destroyed in the battle, Karala and Joliver are protected by the Ide and make it out alive. As the Solo Ship escapes, Doba demands his army to follow them. With the meeting between Doba and Karala ending up as a failure to reconcile the differences between humanity and the Buff Clan, the Ide wipes out both races.
