= Space Runaway Ideon =

Japanese anime television series

- 伝説巨神イデオン
- Genre: Drama, Mecha, space opera
- Created by: Hajime Yatate; Yoshiyuki Tomino
- Directed by: Yoshiyuki Tomino (chief)
- Music by: Koichi Sugiyama
- Country of origin: Japan
- Original language: Japanese
- No. of episodes: 39 (list of episodes)

Production
- Producers: Hiroshi Ishikawa (Tokyo Channel 12); Tadashi Matsushima (Tokyu Agency); Toru Hasegawa (Nippon Sunrise)
- Production companies: Tokyo Channel 12; Tokyu Agency; Nippon Sunrise

Original release
- Network: Tokyo Channel 12
- Release: May 8, 1980 – January 30, 1981

Related
- Anime film

The Ideon: A Contact
- Directed by: Yoshiyuki Tomino
- Produced by: Toru Hasegawa
- Written by: Kenichi Matsuzaki; Sukehiro Tomita; Yuji Watanabe; Hiroyasu Yamaura
- Music by: Koichi Sugiyama
- Studio: Nippon Sunrise
- Licensed by: NA: Maiden Japan
- Released: July 10, 1982
- Runtime: 85 minutes
- Anime film

The Ideon: Be Invoked
- Directed by: Yoshiyuki Tomino
- Produced by: Toru Hasegawa
- Written by: Hiroyasu Yamaura; Kenichi Matsuzaki; Sukehiro Tomita; Yūji Watanabe
- Music by: Koichi Sugiyama
- Studio: Nippon Sunrise
- Licensed by: NA: Maiden Japan
- Released: July 10, 1982
- Runtime: 100 minutes

Space Runaway Ideon (伝説巨神イデオン, Densetsu Kyojin Ideon; lit. Legendary Giant Ideon, also The Ideon) is a 1980 anime television series produced by Nippon Sunrise, created and directed by Yoshiyuki Tomino, produced immediately following his signature work, Mobile Suit Gundam. It first premiered on Tokyo Channel 12 from 1980 to 1981, followed by two feature films in 1982.

Its mechanical designs were created by Yuichi Higuchi at Studio Submarine. The television series credited only the design studio, while Higuchi received full credit for the subsequent films. The characters were designed by Tomonori Kogawa. The series won the Animage Anime Grand Prix prize for the second half of 1980.

== Plot summary ==
=== Television series (prior to the ending) ===
Space Runaway Ideon begins in 2300, far enough in the future that mankind has begun colonizing other planets. On the planet Solo in the Andromeda Galaxy, a group of archaeologists have come across the mysterious remains of the Ideon—three large armored tanks with the ability to combine into a godlike mecha. They also come across a large spaceship known as the Solo Ship. For six months, they have diligently restored the machines, but have failed to get the giant tanks to move. Suddenly, a humanoid alien civilization known as the Buff Clan comes across Solo.

Karala, the youngest daughter of the Buff Clan's military commander, Doba Ajiba, flies down to the planet against orders with her assistant Mayaya to investigate (her commanding officer, Gije, is reluctant to go with her due to her standing and the fact that he once was a soldier under her father). She is pursued closely by soldiers sent by Gije, but they lose sight of her. Assuming the "aliens" (Earthling colonists) have attacked Karala, the Buff Clan begins to attack. Cosmo Yuki, the afro-wearing protagonist of the series, and his friends Kasha Imhof and Deck Afta climb aboard the three tanks, which activate on their own, and, when they initially combine to form the Ideon, fend off the first assault, repelling Gije's men.

This is a short respite, though, as another force is sent down soon after. Bes Jordan, leader of the sparse military force stationed on Solo, orders that the Ideon tanks be armed with missiles, but while this is happening, the cities on Solo are obliterated by Buff Clan soldiers. Gije and his partner Damido, meeting up with the leader of their expedition, Abadidi Gurimade, soon launch more attacks on the planet Solo in an attempt to capture the Ideon (which they refer to as the 'Giant God'). The survivors flee inside the Solo Ship and Karala and Mayaya, who are mistaken by Bes as colonists, are let onboard as well. Other civilians who quickly get onboard the Solo Ship include Sheryl Formosa, a linguist studying the civilization on Solo; Sheryl's sister, Lin; Banda Lotta; three children: Piper Lou, Ashura Nobaku, and Fard Maraka; mechanic Joliver Ira, pilot Hatari Naburu; and Moera Fatima.

The pilots Tekuno and Bento soon join Cosmo and Kasha as pilots of the Ideon's 3 parts and Moera soon replaces Bes as another pilot. Karala and Mayaya are soon discovered to be aliens, and while Mayaya is killed, Bes has taken a liking to Karala and she is allowed to live, although Sheryl and others distrust her. Karala tells everyone of the Legend of Ide, a story of the Buff Clan's savior, who saved them with the power of the Ide. The Buff Clan have searched the universe for this legendary existence, which is what powers both the Ideon and the Solo Ship.

The Solo Ship soon flees Solo using its powerful DS Drive engines and, after a fight in sub space with the Buff Clan, arrives at the planet Saurus Star. Bes, Cosmo, and the others confront Gije in a powerful Dogg Mack Mobile Suit and later in man to man fighting. Abadidi receives orders from above - Karala's elder sister Harulu - that they no longer have to worry about harming Karala and can kill her if they need to, since she has shamed the Ajiba family by associating with the humans. The Buff Clan force chases the Solo Ship to the planet Crystal Star, where Abadidi heads out himself in a Dogg Mack. His attempts to destroy the Solo Ship with giant winged creatures known as Bajins backfires and it is he who is killed by them. With Abadidi dead and Damido injured, Harulu herself heads to the front. Arriving on the planet Ruins Star, Karala tries to make peace with her sister, but is humiliated by Harulu's underlings. Things get even worse for her when Banda Lotta, upset by all the harm the Buff Clan has caused, tries to kill her, but folds under pressure. Karala, who is willing to die, impresses everyone on the Solo Ship with her strength.

The Solo Ship arrives at an Earth base where Cosmo meets Camyula, a female officer who reminds him of his mother. She soon dies right in front of him, which renews his desire to fight. Damido, now recovered, makes one final attempt to destroy the Ideon, but is killed as well. The Solo Ship heads to the planet Ajian, and when Gije attacks the planet, the Ideon uses its powerful Black Hole Cannon, which prevents the Buff Clan's missiles from hitting the planet, but ends up destroying a lot of the planet as a result. Gije heads back to the Buff Clan homeworld as the Solo Ship travels to the planet Flag Star. The Solo Ship and Harulu's Dorowa Zan meet in space and the Dorowa is destroyed. Harulu flees in an escape capsule and meets up with Daram Zuba, a former lover and member of the Ome Foundation, which is plotting with Doba to overthrow the Buff Clan Emperor. With Gije with him, Daram now becomes the main adversary of the Solo Ship as it goes to the planet Kyaral. There, Cosmo meets Kitty Kitten, who desires for the Solo Ship to flee, since it will bring nothing but more heartbreak to their wartorn planet. Kitty is shot to death soon after by Daram and Cosmo is injured, saved only by a blood transfusion from Karala.

The Solo Ship, still pursued by Daram, approaches Earth, but the crew and the survivors learn that their fellow Earthlings will not welcome them. Sheryl and Joliver head to the moon to use the Earth military's powerful Gloria computer and discover that the power of Ide is infinite. The Solo Ship is attacked yet again and the Ideon uses its newest weapon, the Ideon Gun, to defend itself. The 3 children sneak aboard the Ideon in their latest battle with the Buff Clan's Barume Baram Mobile Weapon, which becomes an unforeseen benefit as the reaction of the children in danger makes the Ideon even more powerful and yet another weapon, the Ideon Sword, is revealed. Gije, abandoned by Daram, meets Sheryl and sneaks aboard the Solo Ship. Few trust him, even after he kills Daram in a battle on Earth. With the Earth's military completely rejecting them, the Solo Ship flees without a home to go back to.

The Buff Clan continues to send high ranking Buff Clan officers after the Solo Ship, but they all fail. Moera is killed in battle to the distress of everyone, especially medic Rapot. Gije takes his place as one of the Ideon's pilots. The Solo Ship returns to Ajian, whose inhabitants now despise them for what happened earlier and their military leader takes hostages, killing Lin before he is stopped. The Solo Ship flees to the planet Steckin Star and Gije is killed when the Ideon is heavily damaged. The Ideon continues to get more and more powerful as the battles and deaths escalate, and the Ideon chops the entire planet in half as it makes its escape.

=== TV ending ===
With repeated failure by his military leaders, Doba himself heads out on the Buff Clan flagship, the Bairal Jin. Along with him is the Ome Foundation leader, Gindoro. Karala and Joliver suddenly find themselves transported to the Bairal Jin and are caught by Doba and his men. Karala reveals that she is pregnant with the child of an Earthling (Bes), to the shock of everyone, and they make their escape. The Solo Ship heads there to save them. Doba then declares that he will do whatever it takes to kill his own daughter, causing the Ideon's power to invoke. Karala and Joliver continue to head through the halls of the Bairal Jin and hide from the soldiers. They find the Heavy Mobile Mecha hangar and defeat the soldiers there chasing them. Doba orders his soldiers to find the source of the recent tremors occurring around the Bairal Jin. Suddenly, the Solo Ship departs from DS space right in front of the Bairal Jin and rams right into it. The Buff Clan's forces approach the Solo Ship and the Ideon heads out to fight them. Karala and Joliver, putting on spacesuits, realize that the Solo Ship has come to rescue them.

They leave the dock, but are still pursued by soldiers. Cosmo tells the Solo Ship to keep the Ideon Gun since they won't be able to use it there. Bes and Hatari are able to find Karala and Joliver. A strange light glows from Karala's abdomen. Bes heads to one of the Solo Ship's cannons to help Karala. He fires upon the soldiers pursuing her and Joliver. They make their way to a small Buff Clan shuttle. The Ideon uses its 'All Missiles' attack on the enemy. Joliver tells Karala she's gotten stronger as they head out in the shuttle. Bes tells Hatari to pull back the Solo Ship and have the Ideon protect Karala and Joliver. Cosmo brings the Ideon towards their shuttle, but it is blown up by a stray blast seconds before the Ideon reaches it. Cosmo curses the Buff Clan over Karala and Joliver's apparent deaths. Hatari says the Ideon gauge has returned to normal and Bes orders him to reverse the thrusters and escape. Doba is upset at his force's lack of success against the enemy. Suddenly, a glowing light appears in front of the Ideon. It is Karala and Joliver, unharmed. The Ideon grabs them and heads back towards the Solo Ship. Cosmo tells Bes and Hatari the good news. Joliver tells Karala she's a great woman and that he'd be with her if she wasn't with Bes already. The Solo Ship escapes into Null Space.

Doba orders his forces to track down the Solo Ship, even if they have to go to the end of the universe. At that moment, the Ideon is invoked. Yet another strange light envelops the Solo Ship. Doba and Karala's encounter was the last chance humanity had, and both sides rejected it. The Ideon releases its infinite power, using Karala's baby as the trigger, and the Ideon wipes out both races. It scatters humanity and the Buff Clan, sending them to the end of the universe to be reborn as wise and kindhearted, to use technology more wisely, and never to repeat the same mistakes they did by using technology. The souls of Piper Lou and Karala's baby then travel through space.

=== Be Invoked ===
After the TV series ends, the second movie changes events drastically. The Buff Clan is quickly finishing its work on the Gando Rowa, a powerful warship that might be even more powerful than the Ideon. After Doba declares that he will hunt his daughter to the ends of the universe, the Solo Ship flees under pursuit of many Buff Clan troops. Harulu sends out her top fighters, Tororof and Kilarul, in the Zanza Lubu. Sheryl, drunken and mad over Lin and Gije's deaths and armed with the knowledge that the Ide desires to protect children, brings out Piper Lou onto the deck of the ship in order to strengthen the Ideon. The force of the Ideon Gun blows her right off the ship to her death, reuniting her with her beloved Gije. Karala saves Piper Lou and the Solo Ship escapes.

On the bridge of the Solo Ship, Karala reveals to everyone else that she's pregnant with Bes' child, who Cosmo and the others call a Messiah. Kilarul and Tororof head back to Harulu, telling her that Karala and her unborn child are what manifest the Ide. Harulu decides to both prevent the child's birth and stop the Ide's power from invoking by killing Karala. The Zanza Lubu that she, Kilarul, and Tororof are on is destroyed in battle, but the three make their way onto the Solo Ship. Tororof is killed by Banda Lotta, who is killed shortly after by Kilarul. Karala reveals herself and tries to kill Harulu, only to be shot in the face and killed by Harulu, who flees immediately after along with Kilarul. It isn't long before the two of them are annihilated by the Ideon Gun.

Meanwhile, meteor showers simultaneously strike Earth, its colony planets, and the Buff Clan's homeworld, extinguishing all life on their surfaces. Gindoro, afraid of the Ideon and wishing to flee, refuses to listen to Doba and is subsequently killed. Doba, angry with the deaths of his daughters, has the Buff Clan military force continue to attack the Solo Ship as it approaches the Gando Rowa. In the ensuing battle, Kasha is killed by shrapnel and Buff Clan soldiers make their way to the Solo Ship bridge. Hatari, Rapot, and Ashura are killed, while Fard is mortally wounded. Bes is shot in the neck, hanging on long enough to fire back at the remaining assailants. Doba doesn't care about sacrificing everyone's lives as long as the Ideon is destroyed, causing his own soldiers to kill him, only for them to be killed when the Ideon attacks the bridge. The Ideon tries to destroy the Gando Rowa, which fires and kills everyone and destroys the Solo Ship. The Ide is invoked as the Ideon and the Gando Rowa are destroyed by a resulting blast wiping out the entire universe.

The naked souls of everyone, Buff Clan and Earthlings peaceful at last, ascend through space, having been transported to a new universe. Bes and Karala's baby, the Messiah, leads everyone to a planet that closely resembles Earth.

== Media ==
=== DVD releases ===
The home video releases of Ideon have all had very limited production runs. The series' first DVD box was overproduced, resulting in many units that did not sell even years after the release, so the second boxset and movie boxset had much fewer units produced. As a result, they sold out quickly and it was not uncommon to see the second boxset alone command a price of over 80,000 yen used on such websites as Yahoo! Japan auctions or amazon.co.jp, or all three boxsets sell for over 120,000 yen (over $1,000 USD), a remarkable feat for 38 episodes and 2 movies. (For reference, the retail price on the 153 episode Dragon Ball boxset sold new for 100,000 yen, $800 USD.)

In 2006 Ideon was re-released on single DVDs, but the singles, like previous Ideon releases, went quickly out of print due to a low production run. A Blu-ray box set of the TV series was released on February 2, 2013.

On November 8, 2017, Hidive announced that they will stream the series on their website beginning on November 9, 2017. As of August 2023 the series is no longer available on Hidive. On July 5, 2018, anime distributor Maiden Japan announced their license to the series. A 2-disc SDBD set was set to be released on December 11, 2018, however, after fan complaints, considering the quality shown on the Hidive stream at the time, Section23 announced that the SDBD set would be cancelled and replaced with a HD Blu-ray set down the line. The HD Blu-ray set was released on February 5, 2019.

=== Novelizations ===
No.	Title	Author	Publisher	Date	ISBN
1	Space Runaway Ideon Ⅰ: Awakening (伝説巨神イデオンⅠ －覚醒編－)	Yoshiyuki Tomino	Asahi Sonorama	November 1981	9784257761938
2	Space Runaway Ideon Ⅱ: Movement (伝説巨神イデオンⅡ －胎動編－)	Yoshiyuki Tomino	Asahi Sonorama	March 1982	9784257762003
3	Space Runaway Ideon Ⅲ: Activation (伝説巨神イデオンⅢ －発動編－)	Yoshiyuki Tomino	Asahi Sonorama	July 1982	9784257762102

== Reception ==
The reviewer at THEM Anime Reviews awarded it 1 star out of 5, noting that "plot is executed very badly" and "many of the characters never progress beyond basic stereotypes". The review also note that the show "gained a cult following among mecha anime fans". The reviewer at Anime News Network was much more positive, writing that "While it is far from perfect, I ended up really loving, warts and all", noting its "ambitious and emotionally intense" ending (if mostly realized in the follow-up movies), and observing that the show has "built a small but deserved legacy in the fandom's cultural consciousness".

In The Encyclopedia of Science Fiction, the show is described as commercially unsuccessful, but influential or even notorious for its "relentless pessimism, apocalyptic climax, and radical rethinking of the super-robot format", influencing most notably the better known anime Neon Genesis Evangelion.

== See also ==
- List of Space Runaway Ideon episodes
